= Rockaway, Queens =

Neighborhoods in New York City

Coordinates: 40°35′09″N 73°49′01″W

Rockaway
- Neighborhoods of Queens
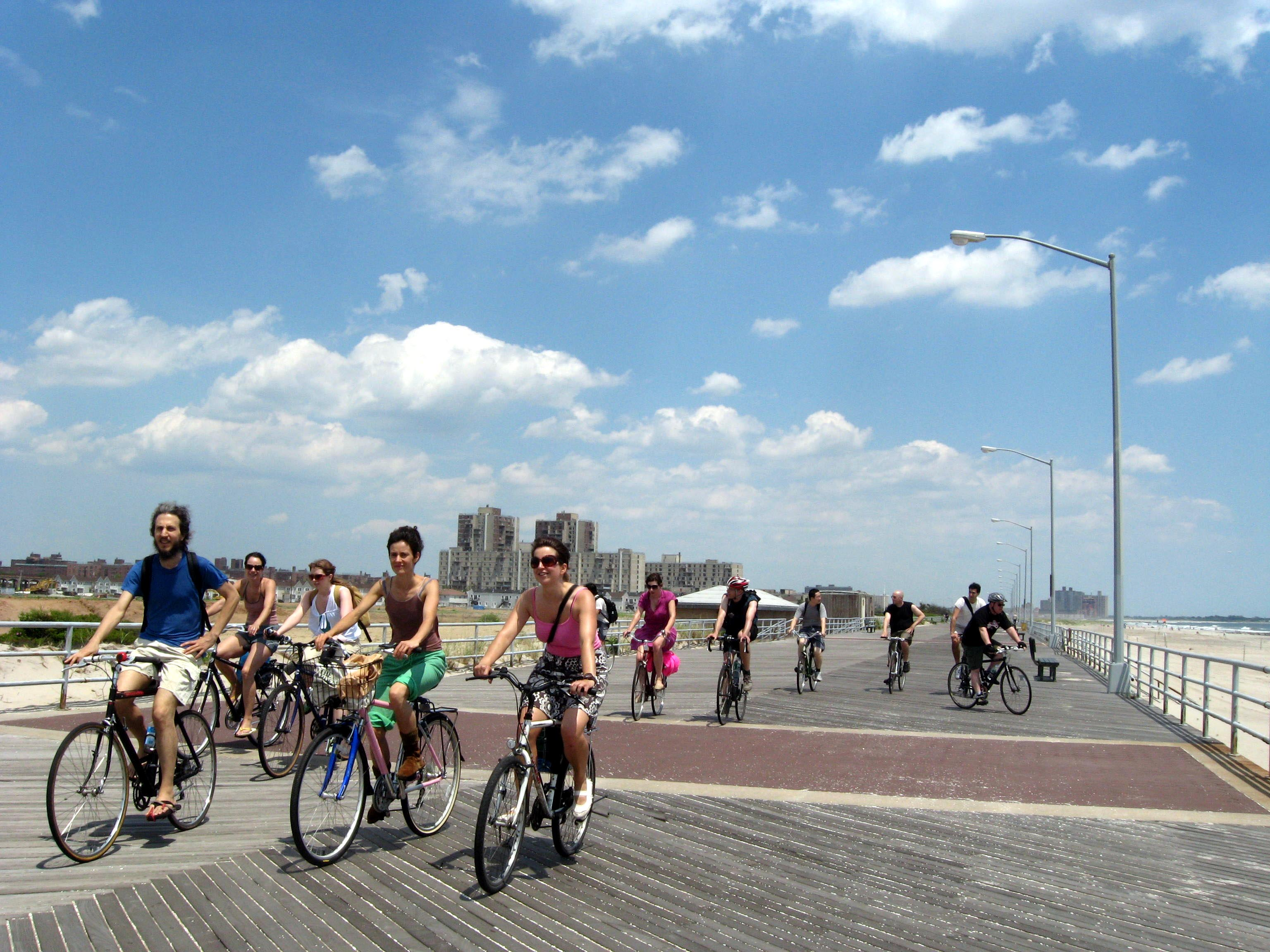
- The Rockaway Boardwalk, a visitor attraction on the peninsula

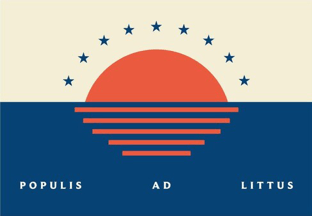
- Flag
- Motto: "Populis ad Littus" (Latin) "The People's Beach"
- Location within New York City
- Country: United States
- State: New York
- City: New York City
- County/Borough: Queens
- Community District: Queens 14
- Named for: Corruption of original Lenape language name

Population
  - Estimate (2020): 124,185
- Time zone: UTC−5 (EST)
  - Summer (DST): UTC−4 (EDT)
- ZIP Codes: 116xx
- Area codes: 718, 347, 929, and 917

The Rockaway Peninsula, commonly referred to as The Rockaways or Rockaway, is a peninsula at the southern edge of the New York City borough of Queens on Long Island, New York. Relatively isolated from Manhattan and other more urban parts of the city, Rockaway became a popular summer retreat in the 1830s. It has since become a mixture of lower, middle, and upper-class neighborhoods. In the 2010s, it became one of the city's most quickly gentrifying areas.

The peninsula is divided into nine neighborhoods or sections, with Riis Park in between two of such sections. From east to west, they are:

- Far Rockaway, from the Nassau County line to Beach 32nd Street
- Bayswater, located to the northeast of Far Rockaway, along the southeastern shore of Jamaica Bay
- Edgemere, from Beach 32nd Street to Beach 56th Street
- Arverne, from Beach 56th Street to Beach 77th Street
- Rockaway Beach, from 77th Street to Beach 97th Street
- Rockaway Park, from Beach 98th Street to Beach 126th Street
- Belle Harbor, from Beach 126th Street to Beach 141st Street
- Neponsit, Beach 141st Street to Beach 149th Street
- Riis Park, Beach 149th Street to Beach 169th Street
- Breezy Point, from Beach 169th to the western tip; this includes the smaller areas of Roxbury and Rockaway Point, as well as Fort Tilden

The peninsula is part of Queens Community District 14 and is patrolled by the 100th and 101st Precincts of the New York City Police Department. As of 2020, the peninsula's total population is estimated to be 124,185. All ZIP Codes in Rockaway begin with the three digits 116 and the central post office is in Far Rockaway.

== Etymology ==
The name "Rockaway" may have meant "place of sands" in the Munsee language of the Native American Lenape who occupied this area at the time of European contact in the early 17th century. Other spellings include Requarkie, Rechouwakie, Rechaweygh, Rechquaakie and Reckowacky, transliterated in Dutch and English by early colonists. (Note: See Metoac#Exonyms and Toponymy of New Netherland.) The indigenous inhabitants of the Rockaways were the Canarsee Native Americans, a band of Lenape, whose name was associated with the geography. The name Reckowacky was used to distinguish the Rockaway village from other Mohegan villages; "Reckowacky" means "lonely place", or "place of waters bright". This area was mistakenly documented as occupied by a band of Mohawk people in a 1934 source; this Iroquoian-speaking tribe primarily occupied the Mohawk River valley in central New York, north and west of the Hudson River and Long Island.

Other interpretations of the peninsula's indigenous name have also been proposed. One possible interpretation is "Reckonwacky", which translates to "the place of our own people", while another is "Reckanawahaha", which translates to "the place of laughing waters". Other phrases, such as "lekau" (sand) "lechauwaak" (fork or branch), also referred to the area's geography.

== History ==
=== Early history ===
In September 1609, Henry Hudson and his crew were the first Europeans recorded as seeing the area of the Rockaways and Jamaica Bay. Hudson was attempting to find the Northwest Passage. On September 11, Hudson sailed into the Upper New York Bay, and the following day began a journey up what is now called the Hudson River in his honor.

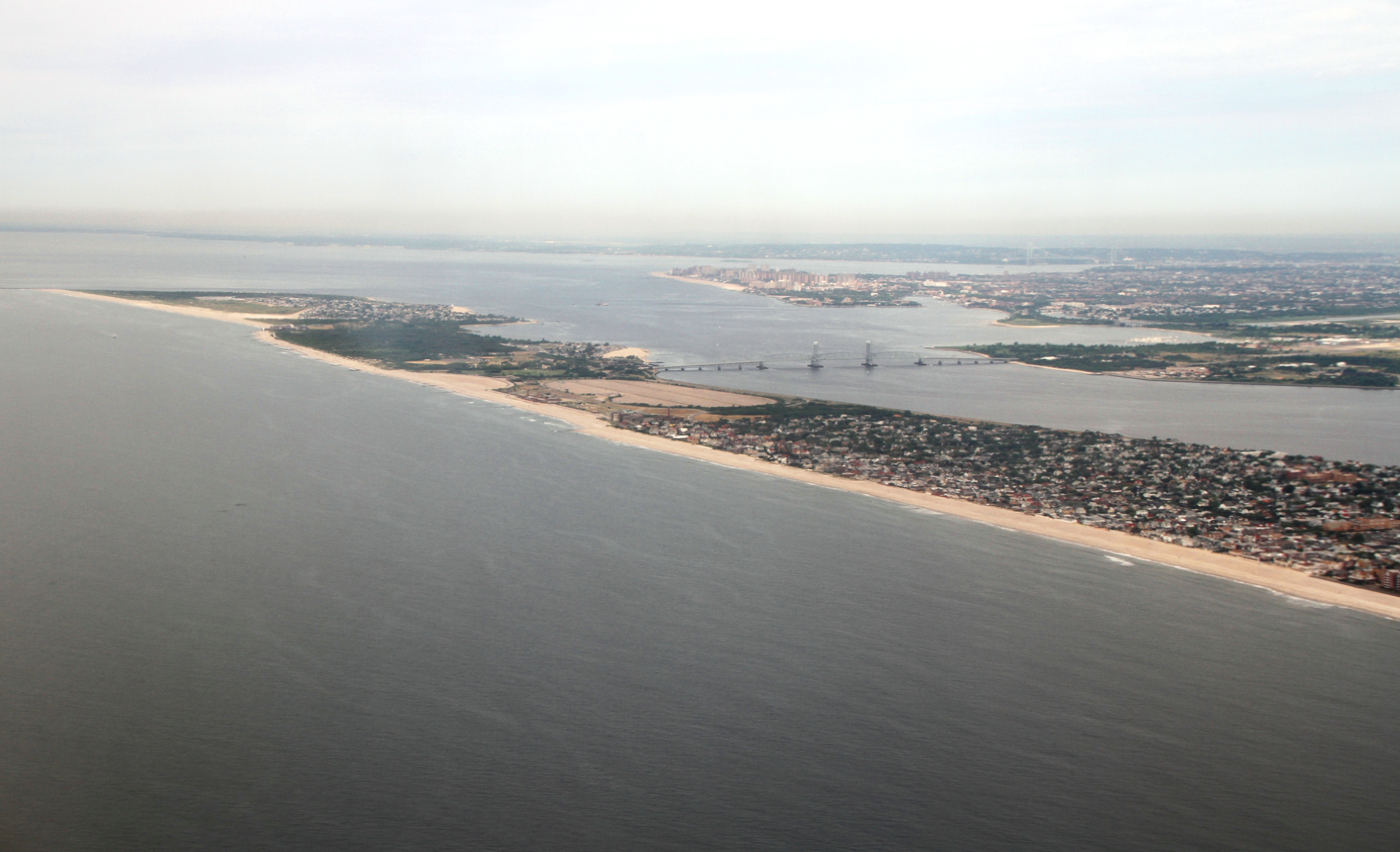
Aerial view of the Rockaway Peninsula (looking west)

By 1639, the Mohegan tribe sold most of the Rockaways to the Dutch West India Company. In 1664, the English defeated the Dutch colony and took over their lands in present-day New York. (Note: See New Amsterdam) In 1685, the band chief, Tackapoucha, and the English governor of the province agreed to sell the Rockaways to a Captain Palmer for 31 pounds sterling. The Rockaway Peninsula was originally designated as part of the Town of Hempstead, then a part of Queens County. Palmer and the Town of Hempstead disputed over who owned Rockaway, so in 1687 he sold the land to Richard Cornell, an iron master from Flushing. Cornell and his family lived on a homestead on what is now Central Avenue, near the shore of the Atlantic Ocean. At his death, Cornell was buried in a small family cemetery, Cornell Cemetery.

=== 19th century ===
The Cornell property was split into 46 lots in 1808 following a partition lawsuit. Several wealthy New Yorkers created the Rockaway Association, which brought many of the lots and started developing resorts in the area in 1833. Rockaway became a popular area for seaside hotels starting in the 1830s, with the first resort being founded at Far Rockaway in 1835.

In the 19th century, people traveled to the Rockaways by horse-drawn carriages or on horseback. A ferry powered by steam sailed from Lower Manhattan to Brooklyn. The peninsula's popularity grew in the 1880s with the construction of the Long Island Rail Road's Rockaway Beach Branch to Long Island City and Flatbush Terminal (now Atlantic Terminal), which facilitated population growth.

In 1878, the eastern community of Bayswater was laid out. One of Bayswater's early developers was William Trist Bailey, who had purchased the property. In 1893, much of Hog Island, a small sandbar island off the coast of Far Rockaway washed away in a hurricane. The remainder of the island eroded by 1902. Plates, along with older artifacts, still wash up along the shore of Rockaway Beach.

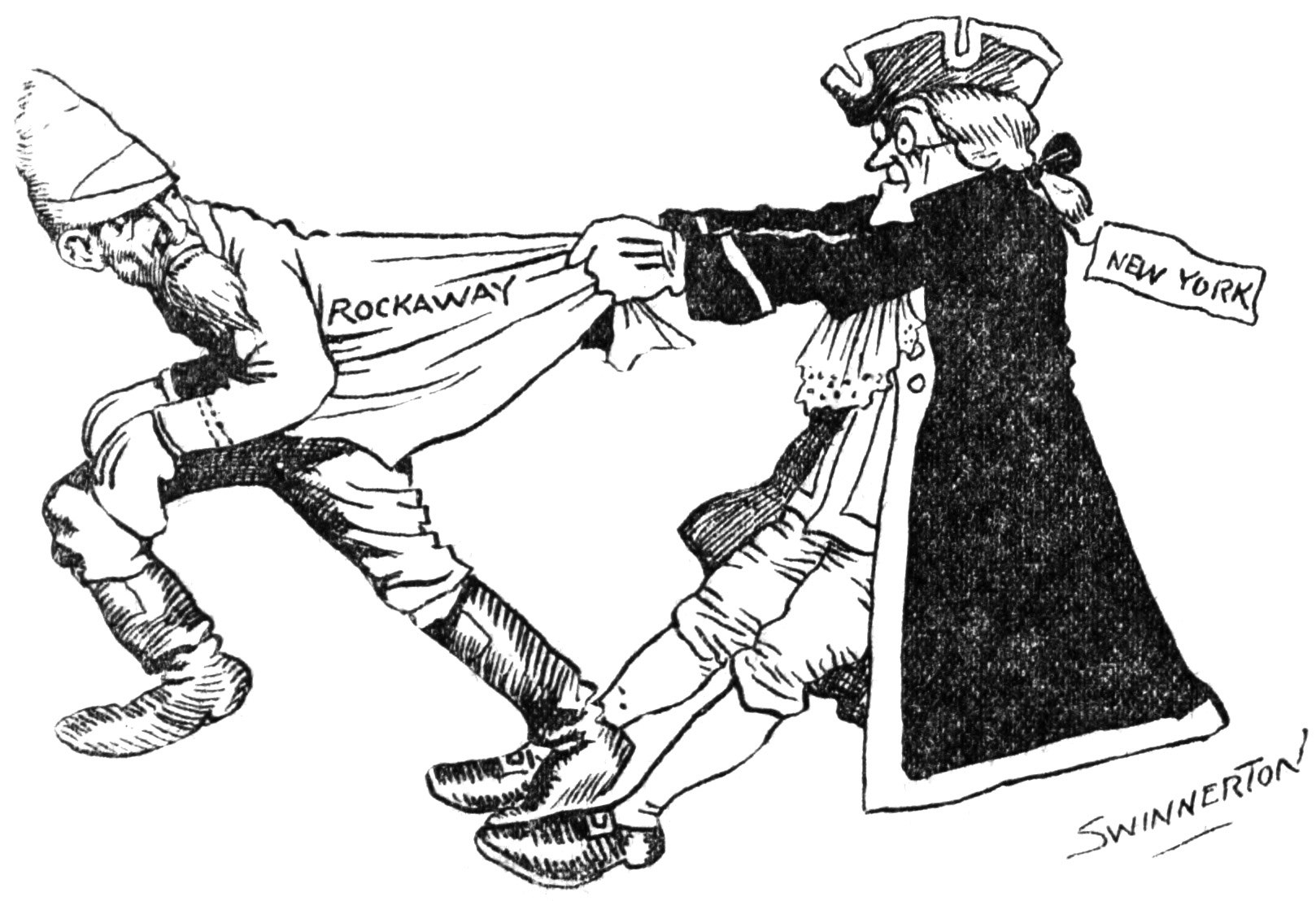
1899 cartoon by Jimmy Swinnerton shows Father Knickerbocker pulling Rockaway into New York City

The Rockaway Peninsula was originally part of the Town of Hempstead, then a part of Queens County. In 1897, the central peninsular towns of Hammels (named after a local landowner, Louis Hammels) and Hollands merged, and were incorporated as the Village of Rockaway Beach. Rockaway split from the Town of Hempstead and along with the three western Queens townships of Jamaica, Flushing and Newtown plus Long Island City, formed the new borough of Queens, which was consolidated into Greater New York City in 1898 (the remainder of Hempstead Town, plus the two other eastern Queens townships of North Hempstead and Oyster Bay did not become part of the borough and ultimately split from Queens with the formation of neighboring Nassau County in 1899). The village of Rockaway Park became incorporated into the City of Greater New York on January 1, 1898.

=== Early 20th century ===
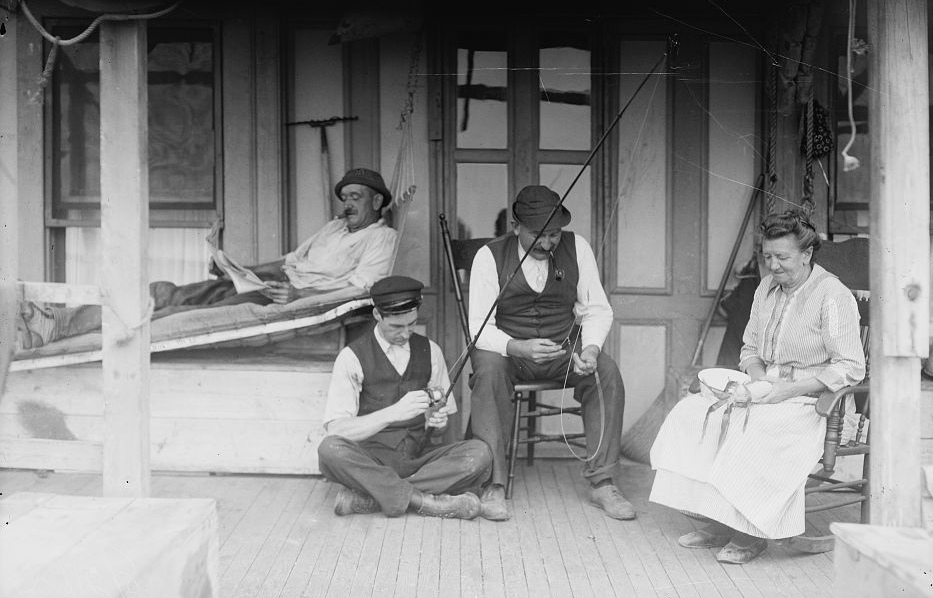
Broad Channel, Queens in 1915

In the early 1900s, a new railroad station opened up the community and the rest of the peninsula to a broad range of the population. The wealthy no longer had a monopoly on the peninsula, and various amusement parks, stores, and resort hotels attracted people from all over the city to spend a day or a whole summer there. Much of the area was developed by James S. Remsen and William Wainwright. In this era, it became known as "New York's Playground". Around this time, Breezy Point in the Rockaways began as a neighborhood of summer beach bungalows; this kind of house became the most popular type of housing during the summer months. Even today, some of these remain, converted to provide modern amenities, although the vast majority were razed in urban renewal during the 1960s.

In 1900, a New York State judge ordered that the land west of Rockaway Park be put up for auction. Belle Harbor and adjacent Neponsit were bought by Edward P. Hatch, who sold it to the West Rockaway Land Company in 1907. Residential lots in Belle Harbor were auctioned off in 1915. Belle Harbor was named by the president of the West Rockaway Land Company, Frederick J. Lancaster, who had earlier developed the Rockaway neighborhood of Edgemere. In 1905, before Lancaster acquired the land, a group of men wishing to form a yacht club entered into a grant agreement with the West Rockaway Land Company. The group, which had named itself the Belle Harbor Yacht Club, bought property from the company for $4,000. The agreement included 200 square feet of land and thirty plots of upland. That same year, the group received corporation status from the State of New York and by 1908 began participating in its first interclub ocean races with some of the city's other yacht clubs. A new street system, based on numbered streets with the prefix "Beach", was laid out for the Rockaways in 1912 to help development.

The central-peninsula neighborhood of Hammels, along with the eastern communities of Arverne and Far Rockaway, tried to secede from the city several times, complaining that consolidation had brought high taxes and poor services. In 1915 and 1917, a bill approving the secession passed in the legislature but was vetoed by then-Mayor John Purroy Mitchel.

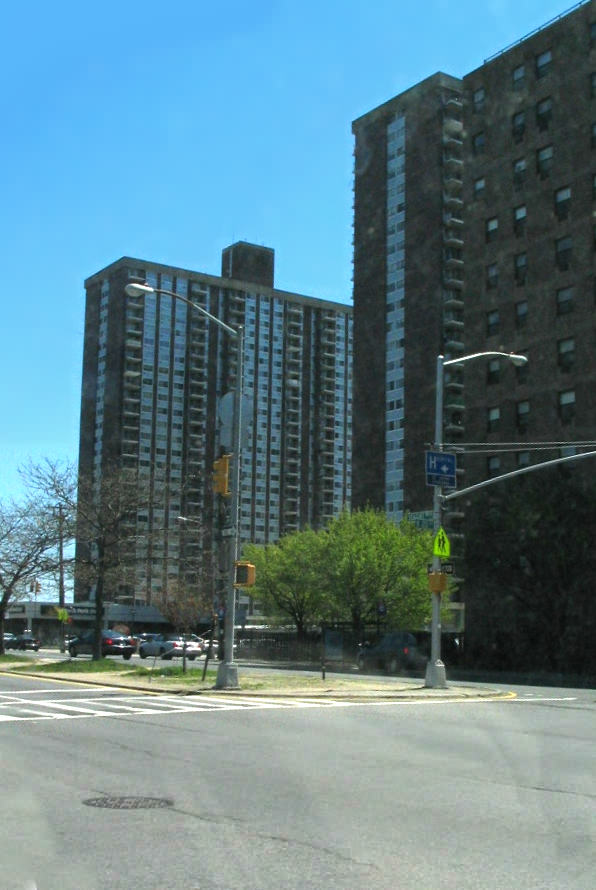
Residential buildings in Far Rockaway

Rockaway's famous amusement park, Rockaways' Playland, was built in 1901 and quickly became a major attraction for people around the region. With its growing popularity, concern over swimming etiquette became a problem and early in 1904, the Captain of the NYPD, Louis Kreuscher, issued rules for those using the beach, censoring the bathing suits to be worn, where photographs could be taken, and specifying that women in bathing suits were not allowed to leave the beachfront. The park was grand for its time. One of its most popular attractions, the Atom Smasher roller coaster, would be featured at the beginning of This is Cinerama, a pre-IMAX type movie, in 1952. An Olympic-size swimming pool and a million-dollar midway also were built within the amusement park; they would serve the community for more than 80 years. It was a popular place for New York families until 1985, when insurance costs and competition from major regional parks made it impossible to continue operations.

Arverne became well known as a beachfront community with inexpensive summer bungalows, and hotels of varying levels of expense and luxury as well as amusements and boardwalk concessions, and it also attracted a year-round residential community. One grandiose plan for the community included a canal running through the neighborhood, reminiscent of the Amstel canal in Amsterdam, the Netherlands. The canal was never built; its right-of-way became Amstel Boulevard, which, except for a stub west of Beach 71st Street, was later incorporated into Beach Channel Drive.

The first transatlantic flight departed from Neponsit on the Rockaway Peninsula. On May 8, 1919, four United States Navy Curtis-model seaplanes took off from what is now Beach Channel Drive to Newfoundland, Canada, the Azores Islands, and Lisbon, Portugal. Finally, on May 31, 1919, one of the planes, piloted by Lt. Commander Albert C. Read, arrived in Plymouth, England.

=== Robert Moses era ===
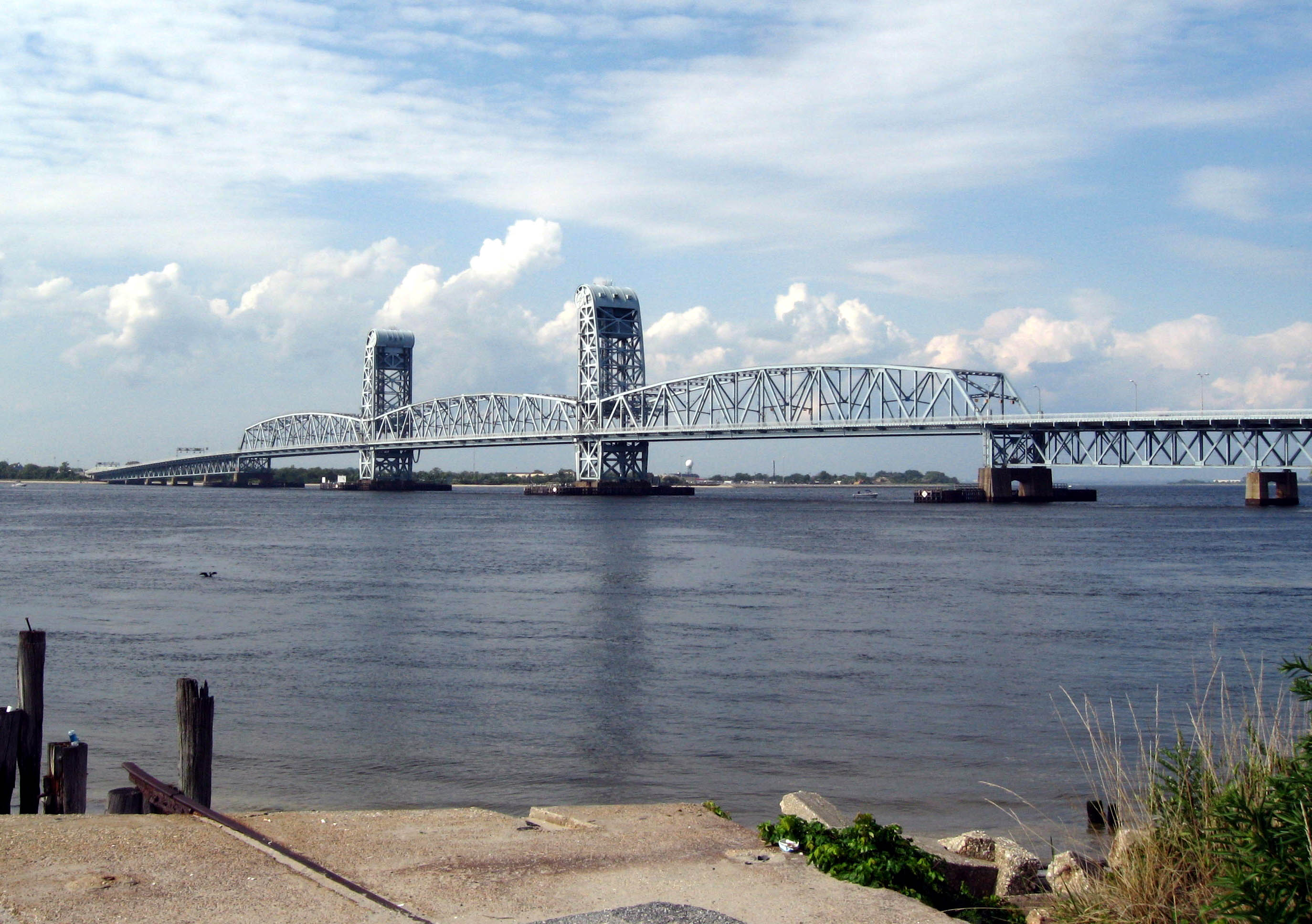
Marine Parkway–Gil Hodges Memorial Bridge as seen from Rockaway

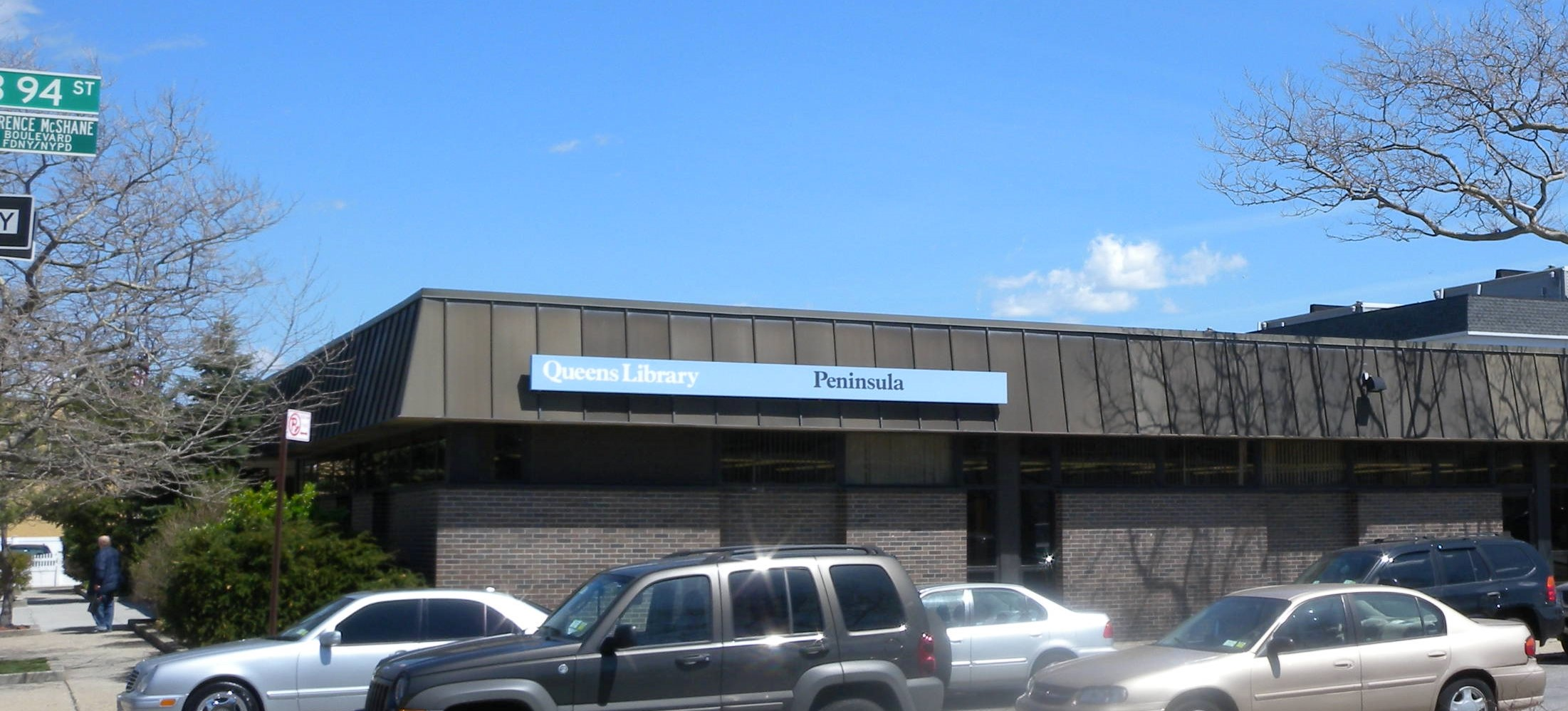
A Queens Public Library branch on the peninsula

In the 1930s, Robert Moses came to power as New York City's Parks Commissioner and his extensive road and transportation projects were both a benefit and a disaster for the neighborhood. As commissioner, Moses ordered the construction of the Marine Parkway Bridge and the Cross Bay Veterans Memorial Bridge. The bridges were completed in 1937 and 1939 respectively. The Marine Parkway Bridge was built farther west on the peninsula between Jacob Riis Park and Breezy Point linking the isolated communities to Brooklyn. The Cross Bay Bridge landed in the middle of the neighborhood of Rockaway Beach. The construction of the two bridges started to transform the neighborhood and the rest of the peninsula into a more year-round residential area or commuter town, as people had a more convenient way to travel to and from work. The conversion of the Rockaway Beach LIRR branch to the Rockaway subway line also brought an increase to Rockaway's permanent residents. Robert Caro, who wrote The Power Broker: Robert Moses and the Fall of New York, stated "Why did the Rockaways end up with so much government-financed housing? Largely because Robert Moses wanted it there."

Although the bridges were intended to improve the Rockaways, Moses' other projects both directly and indirectly hurt the community. One such failed project was the planned construction of the Shore Front Parkway in the 1950s and 1960s. Wanting to connect Staten Island to the Hamptons, Moses focused on making a highway through the Rockaway Peninsula. His idea was to connect the Marine Parkway Bridge with the Atlantic Beach Bridge, which connected the Rockaway Peninsula to Nassau County. The plan would also provide an extension midway through to include the Cross Bay Bridge. Many feared that such an extensive project would do more harm to the peninsula than good and pointed to the community displacement that had happened in the South Bronx because of Moses' roadway construction Even though Moses never got to make his highway, he did leave his mark. A piece of the planned parkway that ran west to east in the Rockaway Park and Rockaway Beach neighborhoods was constructed and opened in 1939. Houses were cut in half to build the four-lane street. Some of these houses are still standing today. The existing, still unfinished street is locally known as the "road from nowhere to nowhere" because it does not have any relevant connections to any other area or highway.

Robert Moses' construction of other recreational areas and facilities, such as the New York Aquarium and Jones Beach State Park, indirectly affected the neighborhood as well. These more modern recreational facilities lured tourists and beachgoers away from the peninsula. With fewer customers, businesses and hotels closed, and by the 1950s, the area had fallen into economic decline. The transition from a summer vacationing area to a full-time residential neighborhood had taken its toll.

=== Late 20th century ===
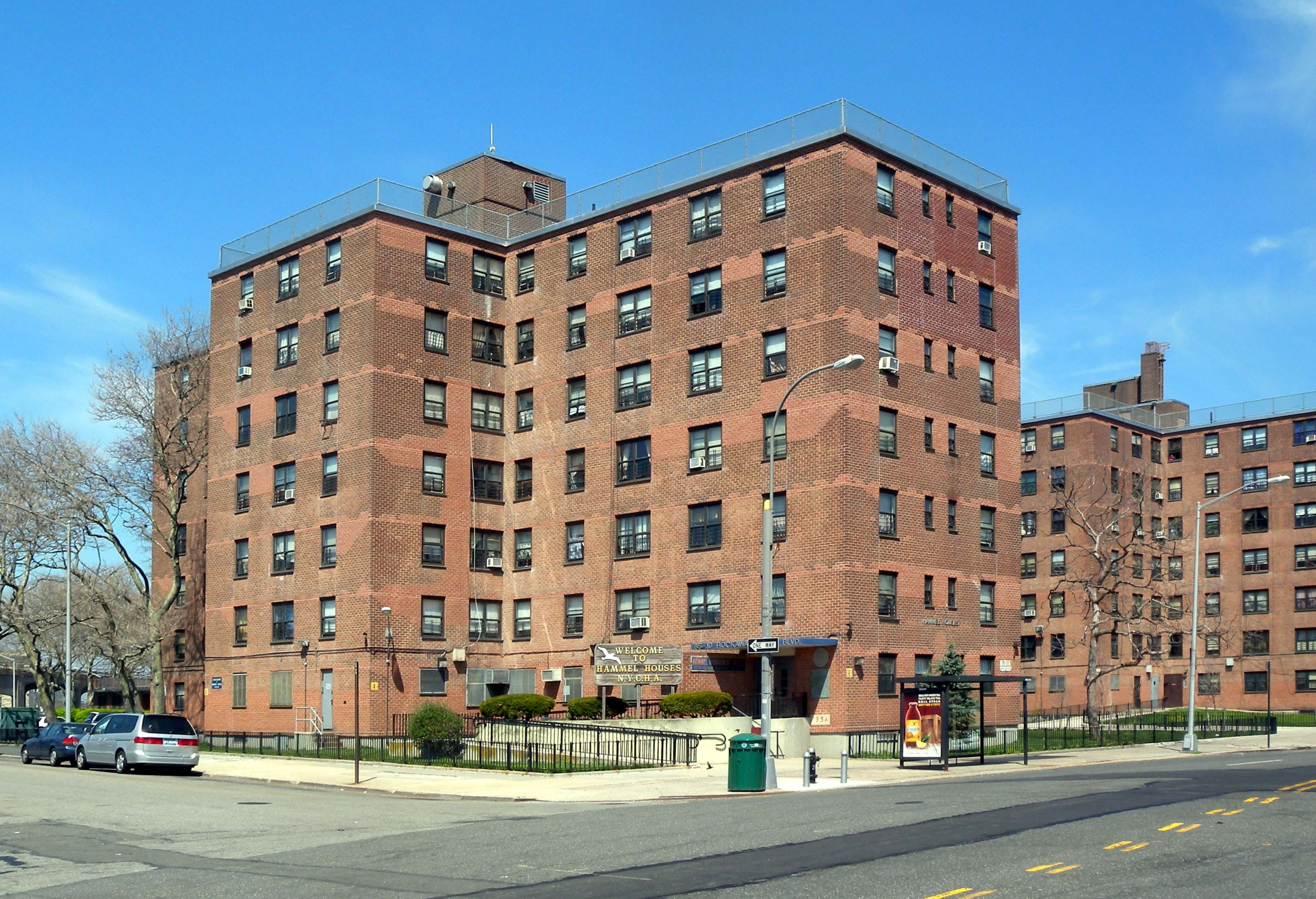
The Hammel Houses in Rockaway Beach

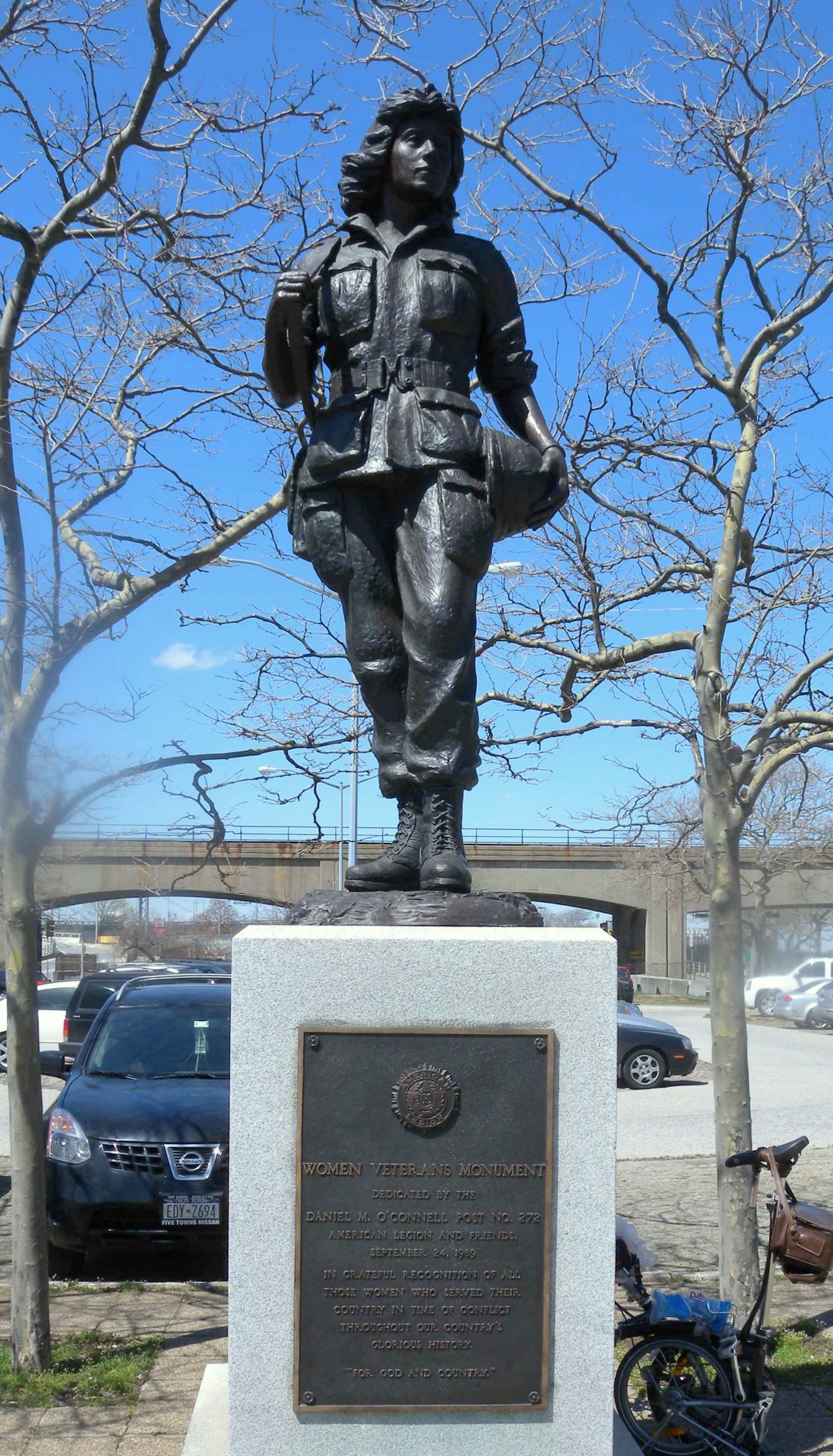
Women veterans memorial

After World War II, several large public housing projects were built in the region as part of Moses' overall citywide neighborhood redevelopment plans, but these eventually became hotbeds of crime and related social pathologies. This provoked a backlash from some of the peninsula's more established residents (many of whom are of Irish Catholic heritage). A strong Jewish community (most of whose members are Ashkenazi Jews) also exists in and around Far Rockaway. For example, the city constructed the Hammel Houses in Rockaway Beach, one of the many urban renewal efforts that dominated the community and much of its eastern neighbors in the last half of the 20th century. The New York City Housing Authority purchased the land in 1952 on the north side of the elevated track. In 1964, the Authority decided to demolish and rebuild the entire area and turn it into a park.

With the advent of inexpensive travel, air-conditioning, John F. Kennedy International Airport, and the Interstate Highway system, Rockaway lost its luster as a recreation area, and development transformed much of it into residential communities.

In 1960, Breezy Point was sold to the Atlantic Improvement State Corporation for $17 million; the residents of the 3,500-home community purchased half of the land for about $11 million and formed the Breezy Point Cooperative. The construction of apartment buildings commenced in the late 1960s and was halted by City ordinance. At the same time, much of the housing in the area was converted into year-round housing for low-income residents, and some of the bungalows were used as public housing. In Arverne, the New York City Planning Commission approved the designation of a 302-acre (122 ha) Arverne renewal area in 1964. However, for thirty years, the area went mostly undeveloped.

In 1998, Broad Channel's Labor Day parade included a float that parodied the racially motivated dragging death of an African American man, James Byrd Jr. Entitled "Black to the Future - Broad Channel in 2098", the float carried white men wearing blackface and Afro wigs, including two city firefighters and a city police officer who were fired from their jobs after their participation came to light. They sued the city for wrongful termination, and their claims were upheld in federal district court in 2003. Residents expressed support for and relief at the ruling, hoping that an end to the court battle would help to rehabilitate the image of the town. The United States Court of Appeals for the Second Circuit reversed the ruling in 2006, holding that the firings could stand.

=== 21st century ===
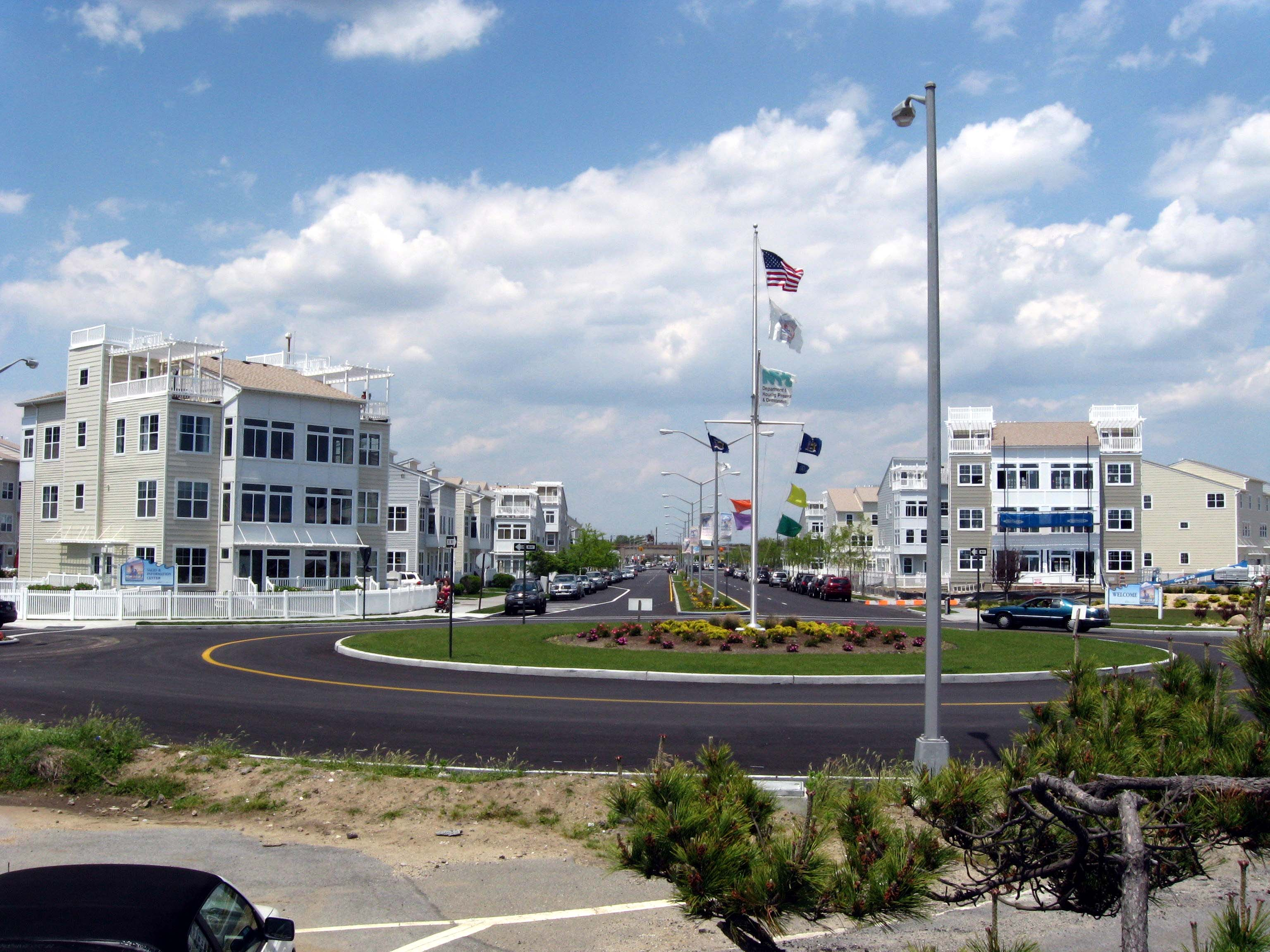
Arverne-by-the-Sea development

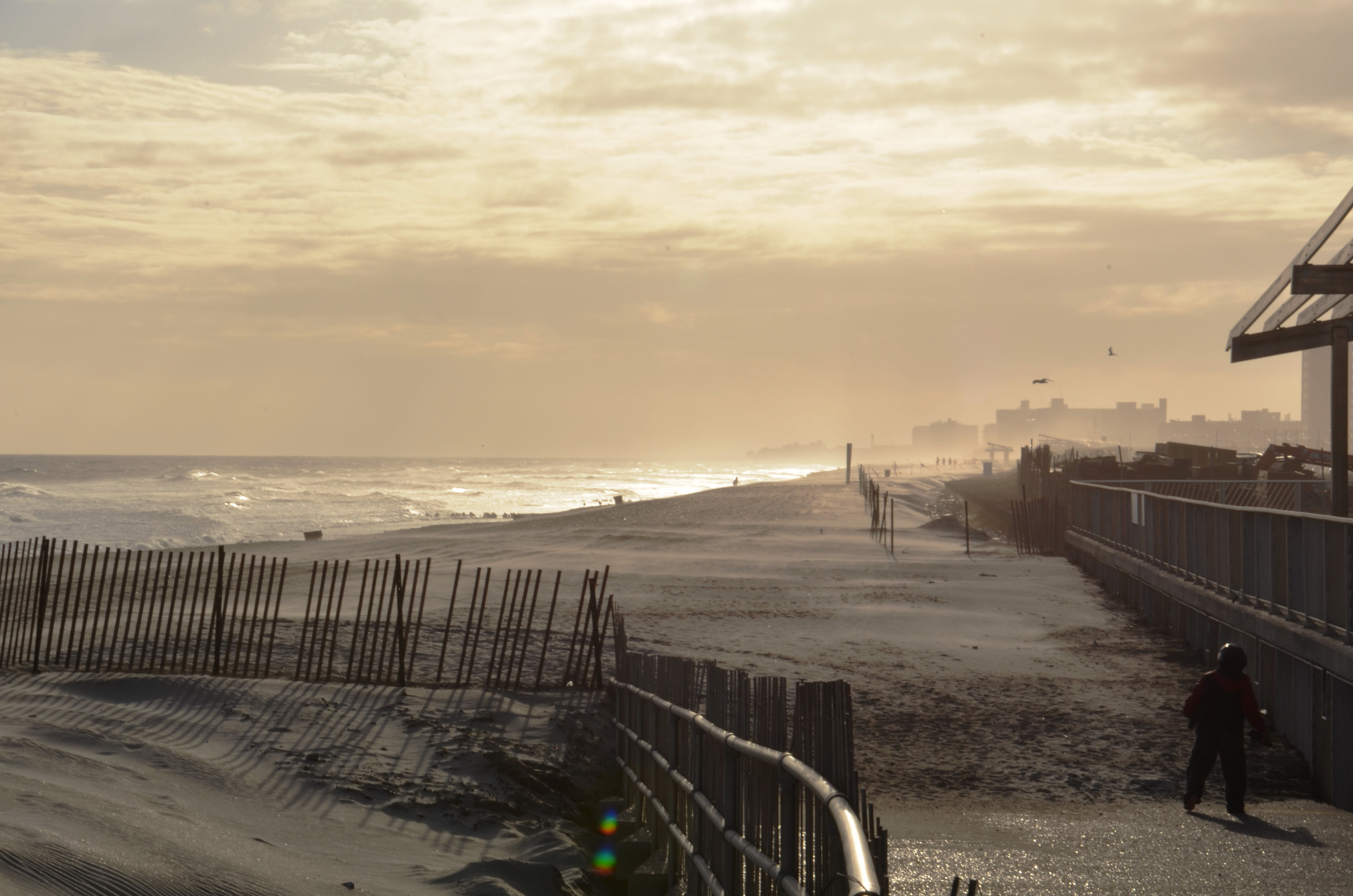
The beach at Rockaway Beach

After decades of grand redevelopment plans that fell through — for casinos, sports arenas, and other projects — planning began in 2002 for a large vacant section between Rockaway Beach and Arverne. By 2004, people were moving into the first completed buildings of the Arverne-By-the-Sea development. By 2012, the development included some 2,300 homes. That sparked nearby retail development. Far Rockaway Shopping Center, in downtown Far Rockaway between the Far Rockaway subway station, and the Far Rockaway LIRR station, got its first new store in decades. Phase I of construction was completed in 2011; Phase II was begun in 2006.

Elsewhere, along the beach, zoning laws written decades ago for the hotel trade have allowed developers to build high-rises alongside the smaller old and new houses. In response, some communities have approved rezoning plans for their neighborhoods to stop "out of character" development.

Opponents also contend that due to the rapidly growing population, the current infrastructure is inadequate and that there are environmental issues to consider. Those in favor of the development, however, contend that the development will help spur economic development and that the infrastructure cannot be upgraded until the population has reached a more noticeable level. Furthermore, some developers have questioned the legality of "down zoning". On August 14, 2008, however, a rezoning plan that limits the size of some buildings was approved by the New York City Council for five communities on the peninsula covering 280 blocks. The communities that were included are Rockaway Park, Rockaway Beach, Somerville, Edgemere, and Far Rockaway.

With more people moving to the city, the Rockaways have become a destination for day trippers. The area appears in New York Magazine's 2007 spring travel issue as a place for "male bonding" and to "scuba dive for sunken ships" via Sheepshead Bay's Jeanne II docks at Pier Five. Today, the area still draws crowds during the summer with well-tended beaches. Jacob Riis Park and Fort Tilden are situated towards the western end of the peninsula, and are part of the Gateway National Recreational Area, which was created in 1972 as one of the first urban national parks. The 5.5 miles (8.9 km) long Rockaway Boardwalk and 170 acres (0.69 km^{2}) of sandy beaches, fully accessible by the subway, make this a rather popular summer day trip for New York City residents. Toward the western end of the boardwalk, several portions of the beach are fenced off to preserve the nesting habitat for several species of terns and plovers, making for an urban birdwatching locale.

After 2010, there was a major resurgence in the Rockaways' popularity. Various media began reporting on artists such as Andrew VanWyngarden, co-founder of popular psychedelic rock band MGMT, purchasing homes on the beach. The peninsula was dubbed "Williamsburg on the Rockaways" because some surfers from there began to spend whole summers out in the Rockaways. A number of businesses that cater to them have become popular among these down for the day tourists. There is even a summer shuttle bus which transports people from Williamsburg to the Rockaways.

In February 2016, the Rockaway Peninsula was one of four neighborhoods featured in an article in The New York Times about "New York's Next Hot Neighborhoods".

=== Disasters and events ===
==== 19th and 20th centuries ====
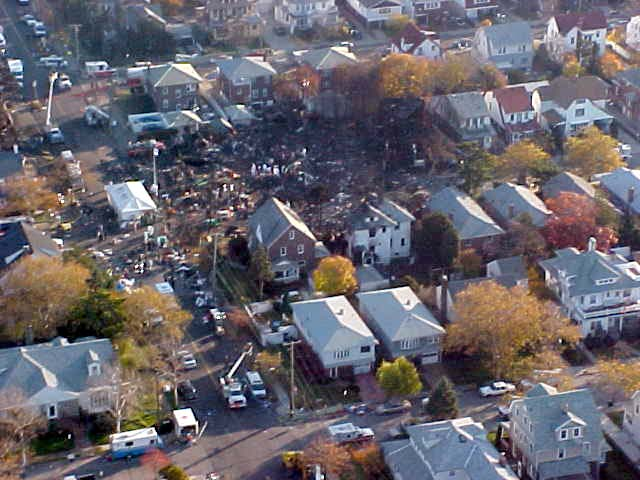
Aftermath of the American Airlines Flight 587 crash in 2001, from National Oceanic and Atmospheric Administration photo

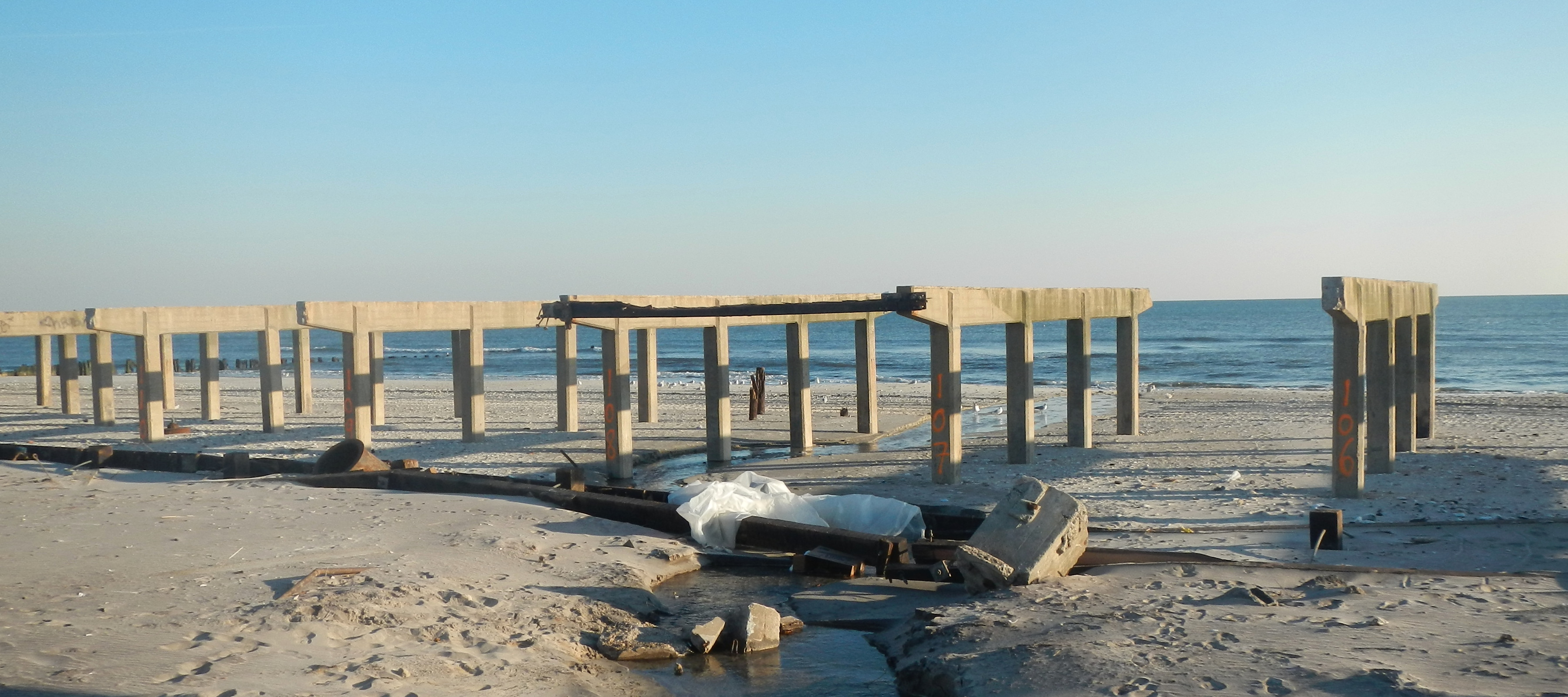
Boardwalk stripped by Hurricane Sandy in 2012

Storms and fires damaged many of the attractions on the Rockaway Peninsula in the late 19th and early 20th centuries. On August 24, 1893, an intense storm, later classified as a hurricane, destroyed Hog Island, a mile-long island off the Rockaway coast that supported bath houses, restaurants and other leisure-time venues. On January 3, 1914, a violent storm devastated the peninsula, and swept the 1,200-seat Arverne Pier Theater away to sea. On June 15, 1922, much of Arverne was leveled by a fire that left about 10,000 people homeless, although the neighborhood was quick to rebuild.

On June 6, 1993, a ship called the Golden Venture beached near Fort Tilden on the western half of the Rockaway Peninsula. The ship contained 296 Chinese illegal immigrants, including 13 crew members. Ten people drowned trying to reach shore.

==== 2001 disasters ====
Over 70 Rockaway residents were killed in the September 11 attacks on the World Trade Center in 2001, including people who worked there and New York City Fire Department firefighters and EMS personnel dispatched to the location. The city later opened Tribute Park on Jamaica Bay north of the Beach 116th Street shopping area in Rockaway Park, dedicating it to their memory. In the center of the park is a piece of twisted steel from the ruins of the trade center's Twin Towers. Solemn ceremonies are held at the park every September 11, including a reading of the names of all the locals who perished on that day.

Almost exactly two months after 9/11, on November 12, 2001, American Airlines Flight 587 crashed in Belle Harbor, killing 265 people: 260 aboard the aircraft and five on the ground. Many of the passengers on the plane were from the Dominican community in Washington Heights, Manhattan. A temporary memorial was developed at the actual site of the disaster, on Newport Avenue. But after consultation with the families in the Belle Harbor and Washington Heights communities, a public memorial was erected at the south end of Beach 116th Street, a major shopping district and transportation hub in the area. Ceremonies commemorating the disaster are held at the memorial every November 12, including a reading of the names of all of those killed in the crash. In 2001, a resident told The Guardian: "It's impossible to understand unless you live here ... Father Michael Geraghty, a priest quoted in the same article, said that it was common for people to live in the houses that their parents lived in and that many families lived in the same houses for generations. The neighborhood suffered heavy losses from the September 11, 2001, terrorist attacks." The impact of the 9/11 attacks and Flight 587 on the community was the subject of the book Braving the Waves: Rockaway Rises, and Rises Again by Kevin Boyle. (Note: Boyle was also the publisher of the peninsula's newest newspaper, The Rockaway Times. Boyle was the former editor of The Wave, one of Rockaway's local newspapers and the oldest weekly newspaper in New York City.) The book contained many personal accounts of Rockaway residents and is interspersed with descriptions of other disasters in the Rockaways.

==== Hurricane Sandy ====
In October 2012, Rockaway was devastated by Hurricane Sandy. Many homes, especially in Breezy Point, were damaged or destroyed by high water, or by fires that raged beyond the capability of first responders to contain them. Residents lost everything in their basements, and hundreds of vehicles were ruined. One car caught fire when someone tried to start their vehicle, but residents put the fire out before official help arrived. On August 4, 2013, Senator Charles Schumer announced that the first phase of reconstruction on the beach, completed, would lay the groundwork for a second contract awarded later during the summer of 2013, totally paid for by the federal government through the Hurricane Sandy relief bill.

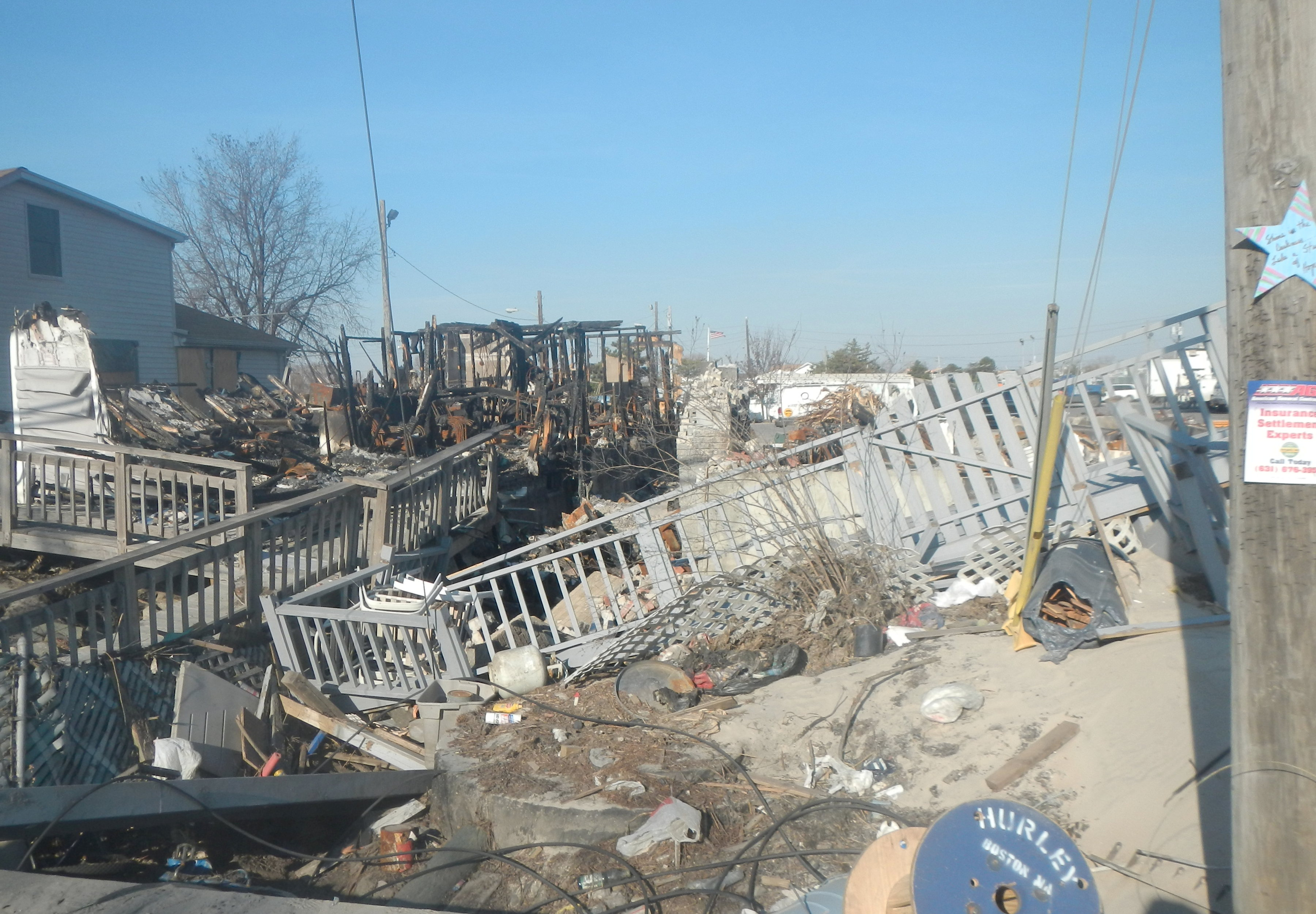
Breezy Point

During the storm, a fire spread between the closely spaced houses of Breezy Point, while firefighters' access to the area was greatly hampered by flooding. It destroyed 126 homes and damaged 22 more. Thousands of other houses were damaged by the flooding. Fires also wreaked havoc along several blocks of Beach 130th Street in Belle Harbor, and among storefronts along Rockaway Beach Blvd. near Beach 114th Street in Rockaway Park. Large portions of the Rockaway Boardwalk were swept away by the floodwaters, leaving only its supporting piers. The FDNY found 130 homes burned to the ground. Nearby, another 50 homes were damaged by the fire. According to an official report in December, rising seawater caused the fire by contacting a house's electrical wires. "Whalemina," a large, brightly colored statue of a smiling whale that had been a beloved iconic symbol of Rockaway since the 1990s, disappeared from Beach 94th Street near the Boardwalk and was presumed to have been swept out to sea.

== Communities ==
- Arverne – between Beach 56th Street and Beach 79th Street
- Bayswater – located to the northeast of Far Rockaway, along the southeastern shore of Jamaica Bay
- Belle Harbor – between Beach 126th Street and Beach 141st Street
- Breezy Point – located on the westernmost portion of the Rockaways, west of Fort Tilden
- Broad Channel – while not technically on the peninsula, it is located just north of the Cross Bay Veterans Memorial Bridge
- Edgemere – between Beach 32nd Street and Beach 56th Street
- Far Rockaway – between Nassau County line and Beach 32nd Street
- Hammels – along Beach 84th Street; also extends to Beach 79th Street
- Neponsit – between Beach 142nd Street and Beach 149th Street
- Rockaway Beach – between Beach 73rd Street and Beach 108th Street
- Rockaway Park – between Beach 105th Street and Beach 126th Street
- Roxbury – west of Marine Parkway Bridge, on the north side of Beach Channel Drive/State Road
- Seaside – between Beach 84th Street and Beach 105th Street

== Demographics ==
Based on data from the 2010 United States census, the population of the Rockaways, including Broad Channel, was 114,961, a change of 8,261 (7.2%) from the 106,700 counted in 2000. Covering an area of 4,758.96 acres (1,925.88 ha), the neighborhood had a population density of 24.2 inhabitants per acre (15,500/sq mi; 6,000/km^{2}).

The racial makeup of the neighborhood was 35.2% (40,446) White, 38.9% (44,663) African American, 0.3% (309) Native American, 2.2% (2,555) Asian, 0.1% (63) Pacific Islander, 0.8% (877) from other races, and 1.7% (1,950) from two or more races. Hispanic or Latino of any race were 21% (24,098) of the population.

The entirety of Community Board 14, which comprises the Rockaways and Broad Channel, had 114,390 inhabitants as of NYC Health's 2018 Community Health Profile, with an average life expectancy of 76.5 years. This is lower than the median life expectancy of 81.2 for all New York City neighborhoods. Most inhabitants are middle-aged adults and youth: 26% are between the ages of 0–17, 25% between 25 and 44, and 26% between 45 and 64. The ratio of college-aged and elderly residents was lower, at 8% and 14% respectively.

As of 2017, the median household income in Community Board 14 was $54,012. In 2018, an estimated 18% of Rockaway residents lived impoverished, compared to 19% in all of Queens and 20% in all of New York City. One in eleven residents (9%) were unemployed, compared to 8% in Queens and 9% in New York City. Rent burden, or the percentage of residents who have difficulty paying their rent, is 53% in Rockaway, slightly higher than the boroughwide and citywide rates of 53% and 51% respectively. Based on this calculation, as of 2018, Rockaway is considered to be high-income relative to the rest of the city and not gentrifying.

== Police and crime ==
Rockaway is patrolled by two precincts of the NYPD. The 101st Precinct is located at 16-12 Mott Avenue and serves Far Rockaway, while the 100th Precinct is located at 92-24 Rockaway Beach Boulevard and serves the rest of the peninsula. The 100th and 101st Precincts collectively ranked 10th safest out of 69 patrol areas for per-capita crime in 2010. However, the low-income and densely populated 101st Precinct has significantly more crime than the 100th Precinct, which is high-income and more insular. As of 2018, with a non-fatal assault rate of 71 per 100,000 people, Rockaway's rate of violent crimes per capita is greater than that of the city as a whole. The incarceration rate of 824 per 100,000 people is higher than that of the city as a whole.

The 100th Precinct has a lower crime rate than in the 1990s, with crimes across all categories having decreased by 74.5% between 1990 and 2018. The precinct reported 2 murders, 5 rapes, 38 robberies, 93 felony assaults, 59 burglaries, 161 grand larcenies, and 17 grand larcenies' auto in 2018. The 101st Precinct also has a lower crime rate than in the 1990s, with crimes across all categories having decreased by 74.6% between 1990 and 2018. The precinct reported 6 murders, 26 rapes, 151 robberies, 301 felony assaults, 98 burglaries, 250 grand larcenies, and 31 grand larcenies' auto in 2018.

== Fire safety ==
Rockaway is served by these New York City Fire Department (FDNY) fire stations:

- Engine Company 329 — 402 Beach 169th Street
- Engine Company 268/Ladder Company 137 – 257 Beach 116th Street
- Engine Company 266 – 92-20 Rockaway Beach Boulevard
- Engine Company 265/Ladder Company 121/Battalion 47/EMS Station 47 – 303 Beach 49th Street
- Engine Companies 264 and 328/Ladder Company 134 – 16-15 Central Avenue

== Health ==
As of 2018, preterm births and births to teenage mothers are more common in Rockaway than in other places citywide. In Rockaway, there were 113 preterm births per 1,000 live births (compared to 87 per 1,000 citywide), and 20.9 births to teenage mothers per 1,000 live births (compared to 19.3 per 1,000 citywide). Rockaway has a relatively average population of residents who are uninsured. In 2018, this population of uninsured residents was estimated to be 11%, which is slightly lower than the citywide rate of 12%.

The concentration of fine particulate matter, the deadliest type of air pollutant, in Rockaway is 0.006 milligrams per cubic metre (6.0×10^{−9} oz/ft^{3}), the lowest of any neighborhood in the city. Sixteen percent of Rockaway residents are smokers, which is slightly higher than the city average of 14% of residents being smokers. In Rockaway, 32% of residents are obese, 15% are diabetic, and 34% have high blood pressure—compared to the citywide averages of 20%, 14%, and 24% respectively. In addition, 23% of children are obese, compared to the citywide average of 20%.

Eighty-nine percent of residents eat some fruits and vegetables every day, which is higher than the city's average of 87%. In 2018, 75% of residents described their health as "good", "very good", or "excellent", slightly lower than the city's average of 78%. For every supermarket in Rockaway, there are 8 bodegas.

The only large hospital on the Rockaway Peninsula is St. John's Episcopal Hospital South Shore.

== Post offices ==
Rockaway is covered by multiple ZIP Codes. From west to east, they are 11697 (Breezy Point), 11694 (Rockaway Park), 11693 (Broad Channel), 11692 (Arverne), and 11691 (Far Rockaway). The United States Post Office operates four locations in Rockaway:

- Arverne Station – 329 Beach 59th Street
- Far Rockaway Station – 18-36 Mott Avenue
- Rockaway Station – 113-25 Beach Channel Drive
- Rockaway Beach Station – 90-14 Rockaway Beach Blvd

== Parks and recreation ==
The western portion of the Rockaway Peninsula is located within the Gateway National Recreation Area. The National Park Service operates three sites as part of the area. Jacob Riis Park is located near the western end of the peninsula, covering approximately 262 acres (106 ha) west of Beach 149th Street in Neponsit. Fort Tilden, a group of historic military installations, is located west of Jacob Riis Park. The final part, Breezy Point Tip, is a 200-acre (0.81 km^{2}) beach that is also a wildlife breeding area.

NYC Parks operates city-owned parks along the peninsula, including Rockaway Beach and Boardwalk, extending nearly seven miles from Beach 9th to Beach 149th Streets on the Atlantic Ocean. Park attractions along the beach and boardwalk include numerous play areas, restrooms, sporting fields, concession stands, and other facilities. Rockaway Beach is New York City's only open-ocean surfing beach, with designated 365-day surfing areas at Beach 69, Beach 90, and Beach 110 Streets; surf lessons are offered at Beach 69th Street. There are also three wildlife sanctuaries: the Dubos Point Wildlife Sanctuary, Brant Point Wildlife Sanctuary, and Vernam Barbadoes Preserve. Other parks from west to east include Beach Channel Park, Tribune Park (a 9/11 memorial), Rockaway Community Park, and Bayswater Park. In Arverne, an empty lot is being proposed for conversion into Thursby Basin Park.

One state park operated by the New York State Office of Parks, Recreation and Historic Preservation, the Bayswater Point State Park, is located in Bayswater next to NYC Parks' Bayswater Park.

== Education ==
Rockaway generally has a lower ratio of college-educated residents than the rest of the city as of 2018. While 35% of residents age 25 and older have a college education or higher, 22% have less than a high school education and 43% are high school graduates or have some college education. By contrast, 39% of Queens residents and 43% of city residents have a college education or higher. The percentage of Rockaway students excelling in math rose from 32% in 2000 to 58% in 2011, and reading achievement rose from 35% to 48% during the same time period.

Rockaway's rate of elementary school student absenteeism is greater than the rest of New York City. In Rockaway, 29% of elementary school students missed twenty or more days per school year, more than the citywide average of 20%. Additionally, 71% of high school students in Rockaway graduate on time, less than the citywide average of 75%.

=== Public elementary and middle schools ===
- P.S./M.S. 42 Robert Vernam
- P.S./M.S. 43 The School by the Sea
- P.S. 47 Chris Galas
- P.S. 104 The Bayswater School
- P.S. 105 The Bay School
- P.S. 106 Light House Elementary School
- P.S./M.S. 114 The Belle Harbor School
- P.S./M.S. 183 Dr. Richard Green
- P.S. 197 The Ocean School
- P.S. 215 Lucretia Mott (closed in 2015)
- P.S. 225 (closed in 2008)
- P.S. 253 The Randolph Holder School for Social Justice
- P.S. 256
- M.S. 53 Brian Piccolo
- M.S./H.S. 323 Scholars' Academy

=== Public high schools ===
- Far Rockaway High School (closed in 2011)
- Beach Channel High School (closed in 2014)
- Scholars' Academy
- Channel View School for Research

=== Parochial and private schools ===
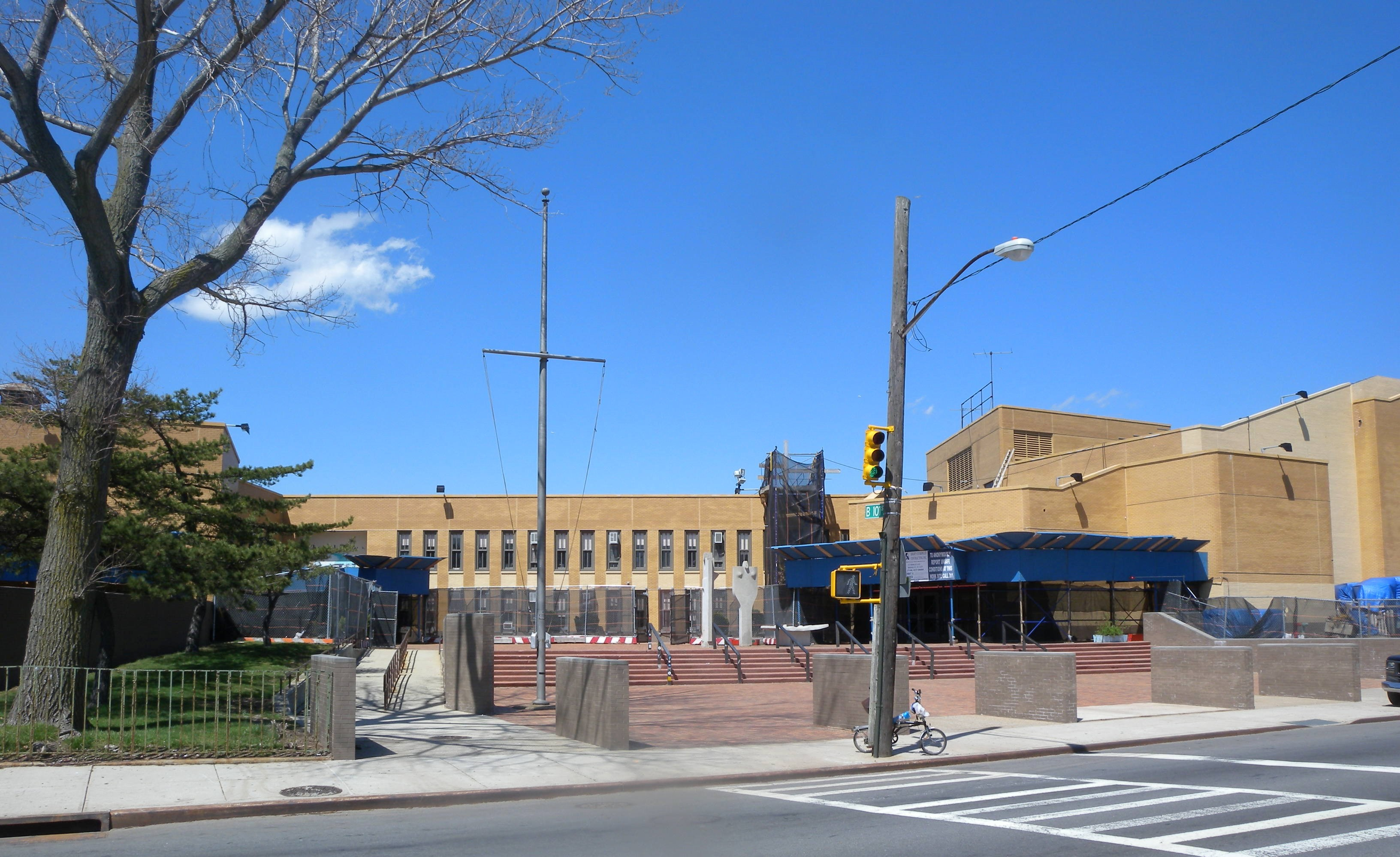
The site of Beach Channel High School (closed in 2014), now the site of Channel View School for Research, Rockaway Park High School for Environmental Sustainability, Rockaway Collegiate High School, and the P256Q@Gateway Academy of Special education

- Stella Maris High School (closed in 2010)
- Beth El Temple
- Chaim Berlin High School
- Hebrew Academy of the Five Towns and Rockaway (HAFTR)
- Mesivta Chaim Shlomo
- Bnois Bais Yaacov
- Tichon Meir Moshe
- Sh'or Yoshuv Institute of Jewish Studies
- Siach Yitzchok Elementary School for Boys
- Torah Academy for Girls
- West End Temple
- Yeshiva Darchei Torah
- Yeshiva of Far Rockaway
- The Hebrew Institute of Long Island
- Yeshiva Bnei Torah
- St. Francis de Sales
- St. Camillus
- St. Rose of Lima Catholic Academy
- Church Of God Christian Academy
- St. Mary Star of the Sea
- Scholars' Academy
- Nikitas Language Abroad Schools, a series of language schools
- St. Virgilius School, a Roman Catholic School that was part of the Diocese of Brooklyn, closed in 2006, as part of Bishop Nicholas DiMarzio's effort to close, en masse, Catholic schools with low enrollment.

=== Synagogues ===
- Agudath Israel of Long Island
- Agudath Israel of Rockaway
- Agudath Israel of West Lawrence
- Bayswater Jewish Center
- Beis Medrash Ateres Yisroel (Rabbi Avraham Blumenkranz)
- Bnos Israel Institute (Rabbi Shmelke Rubin)
- Congregation Kneseth Israel in Far Rockaway
- Congregation Shaarey Tefila
- Congregation Shaarey Zedek
- Congregation Shomrai Shabbos
- Young Israel of Far Rockaway
- Young Israel of Wavecrest and Bayswater

=== Libraries ===
Queens Public Library operates four branches in Rockaway:

- The Arverne branch at 312 Beach 54th Street
- The Far Rockaway branch at 1003 Beach 20th Street (temporary location). The old library at Central Avenue is being replaced with a new structure, and construction started in November 2018.
- The Peninsula branch at 92-25 Rockaway Beach Boulevard
- The Seaside branch at 116-15 Rockaway Beach Boulevard

== Transportation ==
Rockaway is served by multiple transportation services.

=== Trains and subways ===
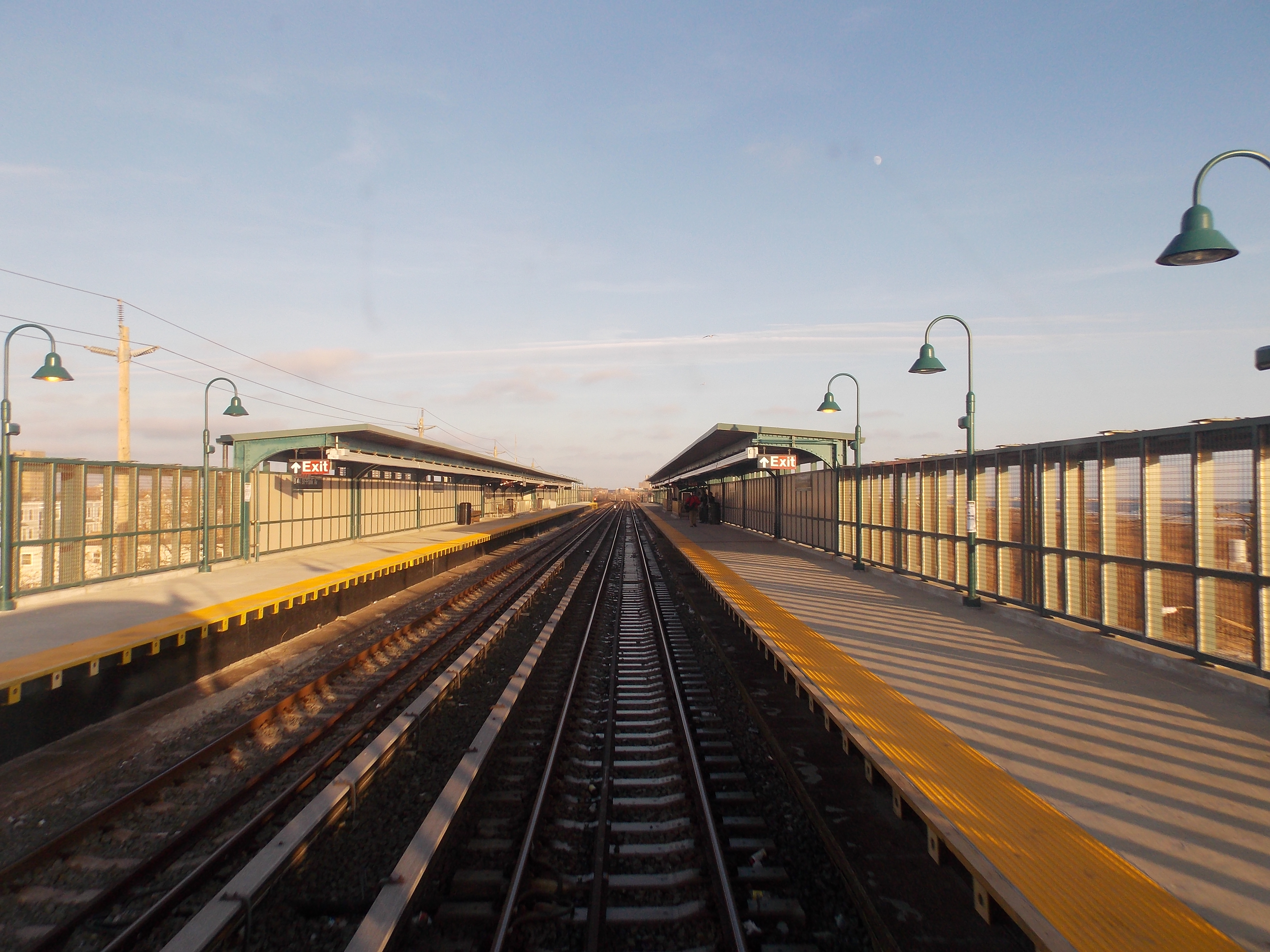
The Beach 44th Street subway station on the Rockaway Peninsula

The New York City Subway's IND Rockaway Line has two branches on the peninsula. The eastern branch, served by the A train, serves the eastern Rockaways and contains a terminal at Far Rockaway–Mott Avenue station. The western branch, served by the A and S trains, serves the central Rockaways and terminates at Rockaway Park–Beach 116th Street station. The latter was the terminal of the former Rockaway Beach Branch of the Long Island Rail Road (LIRR).

The Far Rockaway terminal station for the LIRR's Far Rockaway Branch is located in Far Rockaway. The branch had originally been part of a loop that traveled along the existing route, continuing through the Rockaway Peninsula and heading on a trestle across Jamaica Bay through Queens where it reconnected with other branches. Frequent fires and maintenance problems led the LIRR to abandon the Queens portion of the route, which was acquired by the city to become the IND Rockaway Line.

=== Buses ===
MTA Regional Bus Operations routes include local Q22, Q35, Q52/Q53 SBS, Q113, Q114 and Manhattan express buses QM15, QM16 and QM17. Also, Nassau Inter-County Express (NICE) routes include n31, n31x, n32 and n33 in Far Rockaway only. Unlike other NICE routes in Queens, these buses operate open-door in Far Rockaway, meaning customers can ride these buses wholly within the neighborhood without necessarily going to Nassau County. NYC Beach Bus, a privately operated shuttle bus between downtown Brooklyn or Williamsburg and the area around Beach 84th Street and Jacob Riis Park, also runs in the area. One can also take a converted former school bus named Rockabus from Williamsburg, Brooklyn.

=== Ferry ===
After Hurricane Sandy in October 2012 destroyed much of the IND Rockaway Line, ferry operator SeaStreak began running a city-subsidized ferry service between a makeshift ferry slip at Beach 108th Street and Beach Channel Drive in Rockaway Park and Pier 11/Wall Street in Manhattan's Financial District, then continuing on to the East 34th Street Ferry Landing. In August 2013, a stop was added at Brooklyn Army Terminal. The service was extended multiple times. finally ending on October 31, 2014. On May 1, 2017, NYC Ferry's Rockaway route started operations between Pier 11/Wall Street in Manhattan's Financial District and Beach 108th Street in Rockaway Park, with a stop at Brooklyn Army Terminal.

== Culture ==
The Rockaway Arts Council provides a wide range of events throughout the year. Two art groups in Rockaway, the Rockaway Theater Company and the Rockaway Artists' Alliance, hold most of their productions in Fort Tilden.

Cultural references include:

- Lawrence Ferlinghetti's poetry collection Far Rockaway of the Heart (New Directions, 1998) ISBN 0-8112-1347-1
- Boardwalk Empire, a popular HBO series (2010–2014), was partially filmed at Fort Tilden and the Boardwalk, standing in for Atlantic City in the 1920s.
- Jill Eisenstadt's classic novel From Rockaway is set within the world of Rockaway's lifeguard culture during the 1980s. Her 2017 novel, Swell, brings back some of the same characters over one eventful weekend in June 2002.
- In the early 1980s, Christine Lavin, a New York-based folk singer, wrote the poignant song "Rockaway" about her family home.
- Woody Allen's Radio Days, a 1987 movie about a working-class family during the Golden Age of Radio, was filmed on location in Rockaway Park, with period facades and cars.
- Patricia Reilly Giff's 1998 Newbery Award-winning novel Lily's Crossing is set in the Rockaways. The story, about a girl's friendship with a Hungarian refugee, was inspired by the author's own childhood memories of Rockaway Beach during World War II. A companion book, Willow Run, features Rockaway as the home of Margaret Dillon, a child whose family moves in 1944 to Willow Run, Michigan (now between Ypsilanti, Michigan and Belleville, Michigan) to work at Henry Ford's Willow Run B-24 Liberator bomber plant as part of the United States civilian war effort.
- Naomi Ragen's 2002 semi-autobiographical novel Chains Around the Grass is set in a public housing project in Rockaway, reflecting Ragen's own upbringing there.
- The 2010 documentary film Our Hawaii, by Kryssa Schemmerling, explores the surf culture that sprang up at Rockaway starting in the late 1960s.
- The Rockaways' distance from the heart of the city and seeming status as a sleepy, isolated, career-killing backwater far from the big-city hustle and bustle and professional challenge of police work in fast-track Manhattan was noted in a Season 8 episode of NYPD Blue ("Thumb Enchanted Evening"); dismayed by the news that detective squad leader Arthur Fancy has been promoted to captain and will soon leave the 15th Squad, Andy Sipowicz warns him that "when you're out in Far Rockaway, working some serial purse-snatcher, don't say nobody warned you."
- On The Marvelous Mrs. Maisel, Susie Meyerson is from Broad Channel Avenue in the Rockaways.
- The Ramones' song "Rockaway Beach", on their 1977 album Rocket to Russia, became the American punk rock group's highest-charting single, peaking at number 66 on the Billboard Hot 100. Written in the surf rock style of the Beach Boys and other similar bands, the song was composed by the group's bassist, Dee Dee Ramone, who liked to spend time on the beach there. In 2013, the 36-year-old song was revived in a radio ad campaign aimed at promoting Rockaways' beaches as part of the peninsula's post-Hurricane Sandy recovery effort.

== Notable people by neighborhood ==
=== Breezy Point ===
- Hugh Carey (1919–2011), 51st Governor of New York, was a resident during the time he served in Congress.
- Harry J. Donnelly (1922–1989), politician who served two terms in the New York State Assembly.
- Charles Hynes (1935–2019), district attorney of Kings County, New York from 1990 until 2013.
- Brian McNamee (born c. 1967), former strength and conditioning coach for the New York Yankees and Toronto Blue Jays
- Jimmy Ring (1895–1965), Major League Baseball player
- Daniel T. Scannell (1912–2000), attorney and business executive who held numerous positions in New York's Metropolitan Transportation Authority.
- Bob Turner (born 1941), businessman and politician who served as the United States representative for New York's 9th congressional district from 2011 to 2013.

=== Far Rockaway ===
- Nisson Alpert (1927–1986), rabbi who was Rosh Yeshiva at the Rabbi Isaac Elchanan Theological Seminary
- Khaleel Anderson (born 1996), politician who has represented the 31st district of the New York State Assembly since 2020
- Yaakov Bender (born 1950), Rabbi and Rosh HaYeshiva of Yeshiva Darchei Torah
- Richard Bey (born 1951), talk show host; went to Far Rockaway High School
- Baruch Samuel Blumberg (1925–2011), winner of 1976 Nobel Prize in Medicine; graduated from Far Rockaway High School in 1942
- Avrohom Blumenkrantz (1944–2007), Orthodox rabbi who was a widely consulted authority on the laws of Passover kashrut
- Albert J. Brackley (1874–1937), politician who served in the New York State Assembly
- Steven Brill (born 1950), journalist and founder of Court TV
- Joyce Brothers (1927–2013), family psychologist and advice columnist; grew up in Far Rockaway
- Joseph Cassidy (c. 1866–1920), political boss who served as borough president of Queens
- Chinx (1983–2015), rapper, grew up in both the Redfern Houses and the Edgemere Houses)
- Cormega (born Cory McKay, 1970), rapper, lived in Far Rockaway as a youth
- Mac DeMarco (born 1990), Canadian songwriter and musician; has a house in Far Rockaway, where he recorded his album Another One
- Father MC (born 1967), recording artist with Uptown Records
- Folorunso Fatukasi (born 1995), defensive end for the New York Jets
- Olakunle Fatukasi (born 1999), professional football linebacker for the St. Louis Battlehawks of the United Football League
- Joan Feynman (1927–2020), astrophysicist and NASA Exceptional Achievement Medal recipient
- Richard Feynman (1918–1988), physicist and Nobel Prize winner; grew up in Far Rockaway and graduated from Far Rockaway High School
- Marcus Gaither (1961–2020), professional basketball player in France and Israel, who played the guard position and led the Israel Basketball Premier League in scoring in 1989–90
- Mary Gordon (born 1949), writer of novels, memoirs, and literary criticism, and professor at Barnard College; born in Far Rockaway and lived there for several years
- Margo Guryan (1937–2021), singer-songwriter, musician and lyricist who is remembered for her 1968 album "Take A Picture"
- Steven Handel (born 1945), educator and restoration ecologist
- Zander Hollander (1923–2014), sportswriter, journalist, editor and archivist
- Carl Icahn (born 1936), businessman and philanthropist; grew up in Far Rockaway and went to Far Rockaway High School
- Christian Izien (born 2000), safety for the Tampa Bay Buccaneers
- Al Jaffee (1921–2023), cartoonist best known for his work in the satirical magazine Mad, including his trademark feature, the Mad Fold-in
- Shlomo Levinger (born 1997), magician
- Nancy Lieberman (born 1958), women's basketball pioneer; grew up in Far Rockaway
- Deborah Lipstadt (born 1947), historian
- Bernard Madoff (1938–2021), former American stockbroker, investment advisor, and financier who was convicted of fraud; went to Far Rockaway High School, where he met his wife, Ruth Alpern
- Steve Madden (born 1958), shoe designer and former CEO of Steve Madden Ltd; born in Far Rockaway
- Cliff Mass (born 1952/53), atmospheric sciences professor and weather and climate blogger; born in Far Rockaway
- Alice Nielsen (1872–1943), Broadway performer and operatic soprano; owned a house in Far Rockaway in the 1920s
- Barbara Novak (born 1929), art historian, novelist, National Book Award for Nonfiction finalist
- Phil Ochs (1940–1976), folk-protest singer; resided here for a period during childhood and died at his sister's home here
- Ryan Pearson (born 1990), professional basketball player
- Kelly Price (born 1973), nine-time Grammy nominated R&B and gospel singer and songwriter grew up in the Edgemere Projects
- Rammellzee (1960–2010), rap pioneer; born and died in Far Rockaway
- Kenneth Alan Ribet (born 1948), mathematician
- Burton Richter (1931–2018), winner of 1976 Nobel Prize in Physics; graduated from Far Rockaway High School in 1948
- Gary Schwartz (born 1940), art historian
- MC Serch (born 1967 as Michael Berrin), former member of the hip hop group 3rd Bass
- Raymond Smullyan (1919–2017), mathematician; grew up in Far Rockaway
- Kalman Sporn (born 1971), businessman
- Herbert Sturhahn (1902–1979), football player elected to the College Football Hall of Fame; born in Far Rockaway
- Conrad Thibault (1903–1987), baritone vocalist who frequently appeared on radio, recordings, and concert tours

=== Rockaway Beach ===
- Skip Campbell (1948–2018), Florida legislator and mayor of Coral Springs, Florida born in Rockaway Beach.
- Vito J. Castellano, Adjutant General of New York
- David Lifton, author.
- Michael "Iz the Wiz" Martin (1958–2009), one of the most prominent graffiti writers of the early New York graffiti movement.
- Al McGuire (1928–2001), college basketball coach and broadcaster, raised in Rockaway Beach
- Jonathan Monaghan (born 1986), visual artist, born and raised in Rockaway Beach
- Patti Smith (born 1946), punk rocker-poet, wrote about living in Rockaway Beach in her 2015 memoir, M Train.
- Andrew VanWyngarden (born 1983), co-founder of psychedelic rock band MGMT, bought a house in Rockaway Beach in 2012.
- Kenny Vance (born 1943), singer-songwriter and producer.

== See also ==
- Fort Decatur
