= Marine Pavilion =

Marine Pavilion may refer to:

- Marine Pavilion, a villa in the Royal Pavilion in Brighton, England, designed by Henry Holland
- Marine Pavilion (Queens), the 19th century hotel
