= Richard Cornell =

English and American ironmaster (1625–1693)

Richard Cornell (1625–1693) was an English Quaker ironmaster and resident of Long Island. He is generally considered the first European settler on the Rockaway Peninsula in the present-day Borough of Queens, New York City. Cornell purchased the Rockaway land from another Englishman, Captain John Palmer, in 1687, and settled there in 1690. His grandfather was Thomas Cornell.

Cornell owned much land in Rockaway, much of which was partitioned into 46 parcels in 1820, which were eventually sold to outsiders, property was still being sold even in the late 19th century, as for example the sale of the land comprising the present-day neighborhood of Bayswater to William Trist Bailey in 1878.

The homestead of the Cornells by the beachfront later the site of the Marine Pavilion.

The Cornell Family Cemetery on Gateway Boulevard in Far Rockaway has been designated as a New York City Landmark.
