= William Trist Bailey =

Land developer (1846–1910)

William Trist Bailey (October 9, 1846, in Torquay – February 21, 1910, in New York City) was a land developer who founded the community of Bayswater near Far Rockaway, Queens, New York City. He purchased the land from the descendants of Richard Cornell in 1878, and turned Bayswater into a fashionable residential neighborhood. Streets in Bayswater which bear his name are Trist Place and Bailey Court.
