= Scholars' Academy =

Public school in New York City

Coordinates: 40°35′03″N 73°49′31″W

The Scholars' Academy
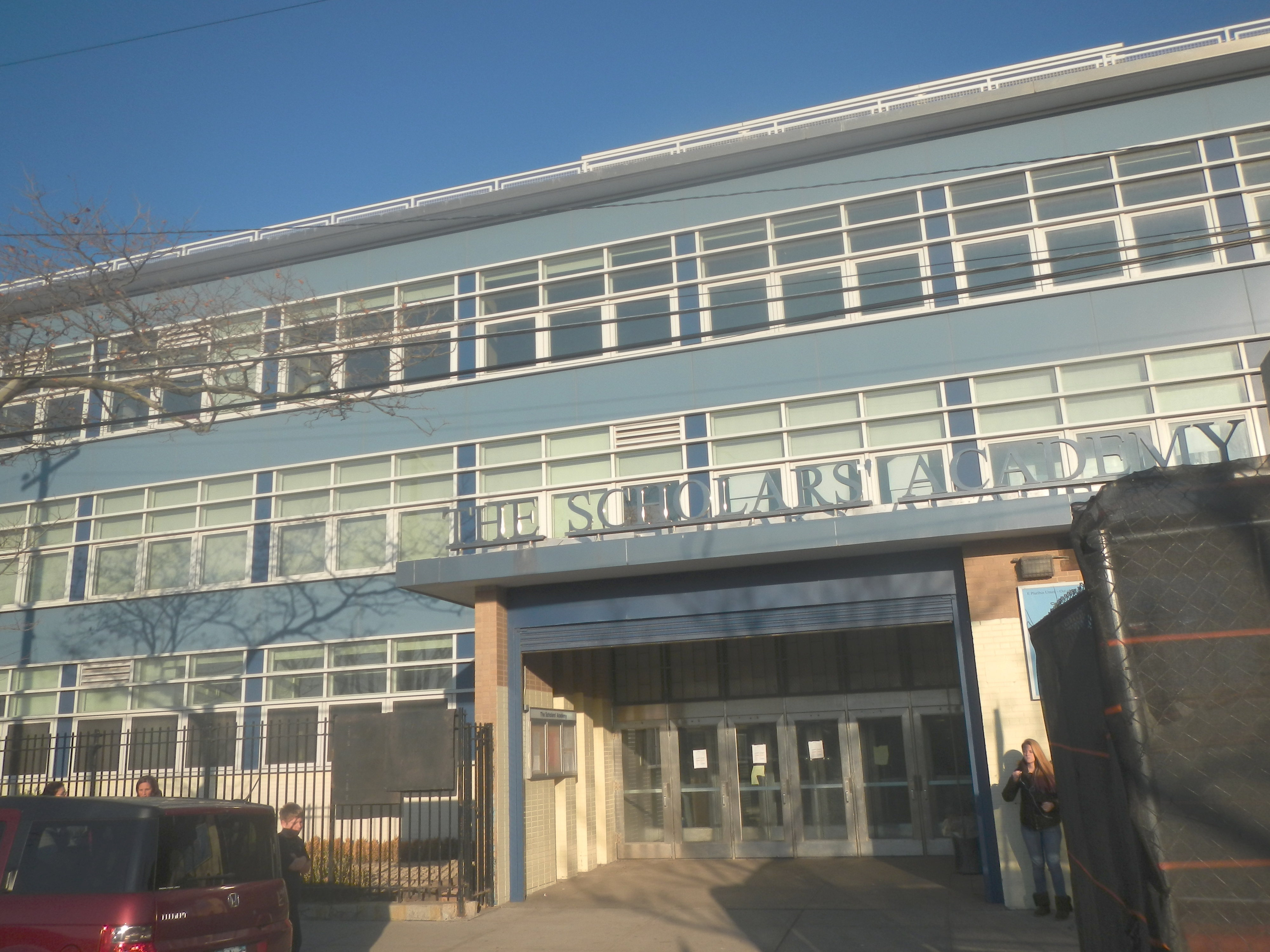
- Main entrance on Beach 104th Street

Location
- 320 Beach 104th St, Rockaway Park, NY 11694

Information
- School type: Public
- Established: September 2005
- Principal: Michele Smyth
- Grades: 6 to 12
- Colors: Navy blue, light blue and khaki pants
- Slogan: Technology today, Smarter tomorrow
- Team name: Seawolves
- Newspaper: The Seaside Chronicle
- Website: http://www.scholarsnyc.com/

Scholars' Academy is a uniformed preparatory school consisting of a middle school (grades 6–8) and a high school (grades 9–12) for gifted and talented children located in Rockaway Park, in the New York City borough of Queens. Scholars' Academy grew out of a pilot program and established a middle school in 2004 and added a 9th grade in 2007. It draws 51% of its students from the Rockaway Peninsula and is known for its diversity.

As of 2014, the school had nearly a 100% graduation rate. The school's founding principal, Brian O'Connell, left the school in 2020.

== Hurricane Sandy ==
Scholars' Academy was one of the city's hardest hit schools by Superstorm Sandy. Students, most of which were relocated themselves, were relocated to two schools in Brownsville, Brooklyn. After the seawater was drained and the sewage was removed, several feet of sand remained. After several donations from individuals, disaster recovery teams and companies, the school was able to be repaired. After three and a half months of relocation, the students were permitted to return to the Scholars' Academy building, but repairs continued through 2017.
