= Fort Decatur =

Coordinates: 40.548°N 73.939°W

Fort Decatur was a United States Army blockhouse erected on the ocean front of the far-western Rockaway Peninsula during the War of 1812. Its purpose was to protect New York Harbor from invaders, particularly British.

After the war, the fort was dismantled and the western tip of Rockaway returned to its fallow, uninhabited state for decades to come before its first true development in the late 19th century.

== Sources ==
Vincent Seyfried and William Asadorian, Old Rockaway, New York, in Early Photographs, Dover Publications, Mineola, NY, 2000.
