= United States Post Office (Far Rockaway, Queens) =

Historic post office in Queens, New York

- US Post Office-Far Rockaway
- U.S. National Register of Historic Places
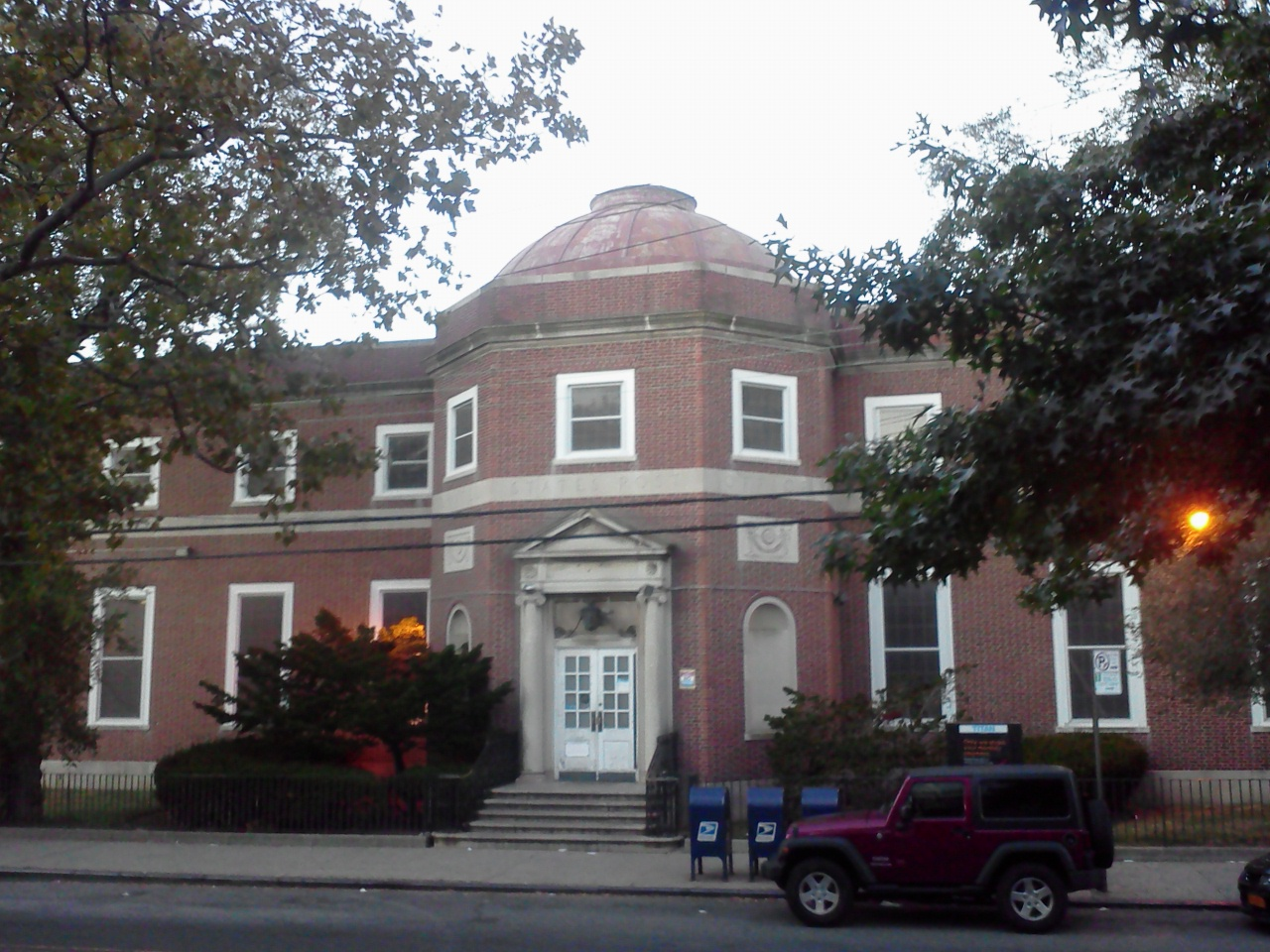
- The Far Rockaway Post Office in September 2013

- Location within New York City Location within New York Location within the United States
- Location: 1836 Mott Ave., Far Rockaway, Queens
- Coordinates: 40°36′12″N 73°45′3″W
- Area: less than one acre
- Built: 1935
- Architect: Kebbon, Eric
- Architectural style: Colonial Revival
- MPS: US Post Offices in New York State, 1858-1943, TR
- NRHP reference No.: 88002500
- Added to NRHP: November 17, 1988

US Post Office-Far Rockaway is a historic post office building located at Far Rockaway in Queens County, New York, United States. It was built in 1935, and is one of six post offices in New York State designed by architect Eric Kebbon as a consultant to the Office of the Supervising Architect. It is a two-story brick building with limestone trim and a low granite base in the Colonial Revival style. Its main facade features a centrally placed polygonal shaped frontispiece with a rounded dome inspired by Thomas Jefferson's Monticello. It also has a grand entrance vestibule.

It was listed on the National Register of Historic Places in 1988.
