= Cornell Family Cemetery =

Historic graveyard in Queens, New York

Coordinates: 40°36′0″N 73°44′58.3″W

The Cornell Family Cemetery, now officially designated the Richard Cornell Graveyard, is located on Gateway Boulevard (formerly Greenport Road and Greenwood Avenue). According to NYC Parks Department, the Cornell Burial Ground is on the west side of Caffrey Avenue north of New Haven Avenue in Far Rockaway, Queens in New York City.

This was one of many cemeteries surveyed by Charles U. Powell, chief engineer for the Topographical Bureau, Borough of Queens. Powell undertook this task for two reasons. First, he was concerned that the cemetery sites would be destroyed before being documented, and second, his own Dutch ancestors were buried in one of them. Both Powell and his crews surveyed this cemetery, along with 21 others, between 1919 and 1932. This private cemetery was found to be one of six cemeteries that have survived in Queens. Research sources discuss how a shopping mall developer rediscovered four headstones.

== Burials ==
The cemetery contains the remains of descendants of Richard Cornell, generally considered the first settler of European descent to homestead in Rockaway. In 1970 it was designated a New York City Landmark. Many members of the Cornell family are buried in this cemetery.

- Benjamin Cornell, who died on June 9, 1821, at age 71.
- Abegil Cornell, who departed on April 20, 1762, at age 57.
- Thomas Cornwell, whose widow erected his bluestone grave monument signifying her attraction and his age. He served in the Provincial general assembly of New York for 27 years; he died at the age of 61 on March 24, 1764.

== See also ==
- List of New York City Designated Landmarks in Queens
