= Steven Handel =

American environmentalist

- Born: Steven Neil Handel; January 29, 1945 (age 81); Brooklyn, New York, United States
- Occupations: professor Ecologist
- Spouse: Joan Gang (m. 1973)

Academic background
- Education: Columbia University; Cornell University
- Thesis: Population Biology of Three Woodland Carex Species (1976)

Academic work
- Institutions: University of South Carolina; Yale University; Rutgers University
- Main interests: Plant ecology Pollination; Restoration ecology

Steven Neil Handel (born January 29, 1945) is an American educator and restoration ecologist. Handel is currently Distinguished Professor of Ecology at Rutgers University and Visiting Professor at the Harvard University Graduate School of Design.

== Career ==
Handel was born in Brooklyn. He describes himself as a "nature-loving kid" who grew up in the Far Rockaway, Queens, neighborhood of New York City, Handel received a Bachelor of Arts in Biological Sciences from Columbia University (1969) and a Master's degree (1974) and Doctor of Philosophy (1976) in Ecology and Evolutionary Biology from Cornell University.

Handel began his professorial career as a biology professor at the University of South Carolina, Yale University—where he also held the post of director of the Marsh Botanical Garden—and Rutgers University. In 1996, he was promoted by Rutgers to a full professor of ecology and was named director of their Center for Urban Restoration Ecology.

Handel was the lead ecologist for the restoration of Orange County Great Park in Irvine, California, and his other projects include Brooklyn Bridge Park, and the landscape for the 2008 Summer Olympics in Beijing, China.

== Awards ==
- 2009 - American Society of Landscape Architects Honor Research Award
- 2011 - Society for Ecological Restoration Theodore M. Sperry Award
- 2015 - American Society of Landscape Architects Honor Communications Award
