= Redfern Houses =

Public housing development in Queens, New York

- NYCHA Property
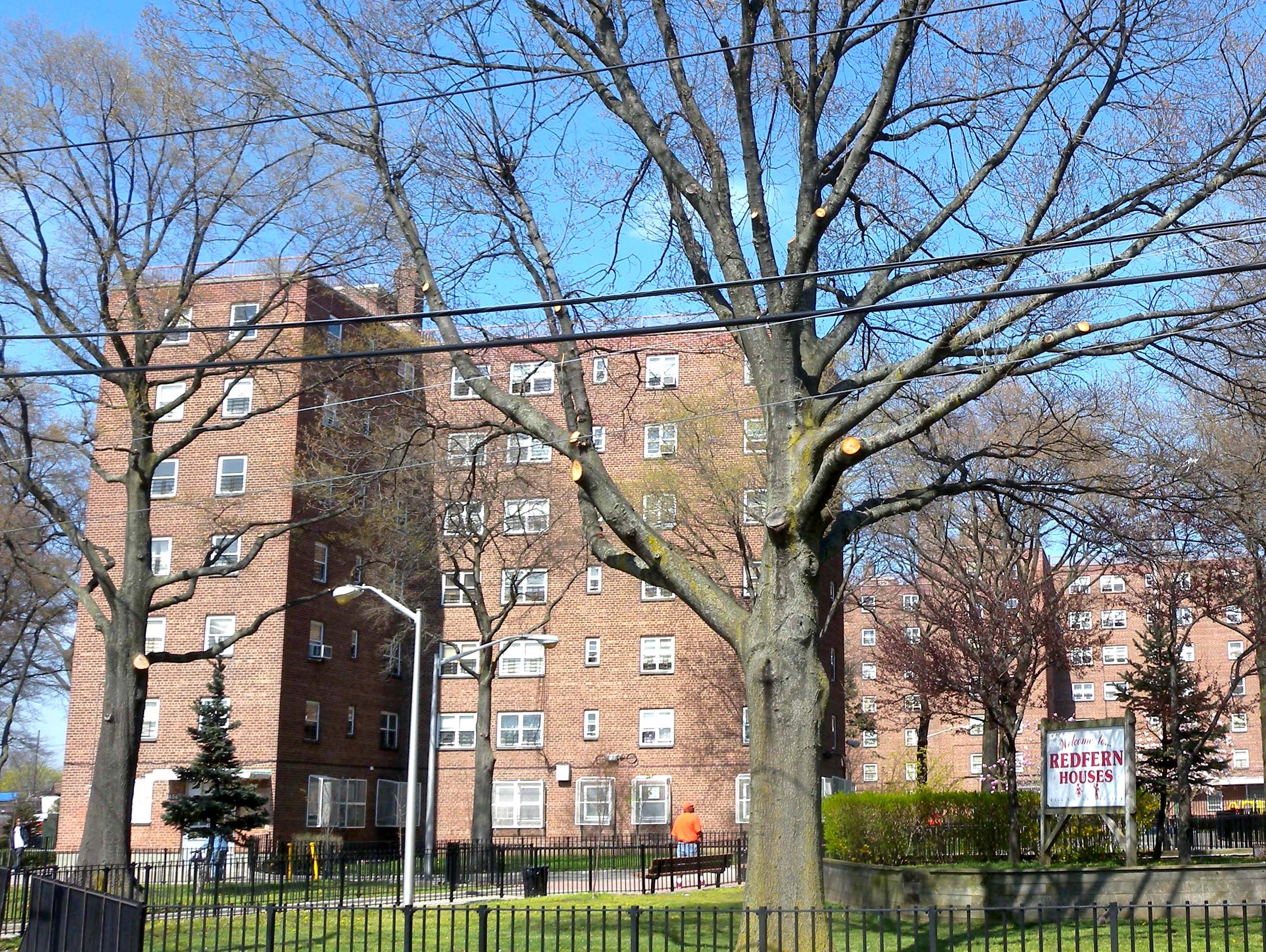
- Interactive map of Redfern Houses
- Country: United States
- State: New York
- City: New York City
- Borough: Queens

Area
  - Total: 16.76 acres (6.78 ha)

Population
  - Total: 1,426
- Zip Code: 11691

The Redfern Houses is a NYCHA housing project with nine buildings each containing six to seven stories. It is located in Far Rockaway, Queens in between Beach Channel Drive/Hassock Street, Redfern Avenue and the Nassau County border. It was named after Redfern Avenue in Queens. It is also located near the Far Rockaway station on the Long Island Rail Road.

== History ==
This housing complex was built in August 1959.

=== 21st century ===
All of those buildings were funded by the PACT in October 2017 where it had started for $123M that will strengthen its structure to restore three playgrounds, resurface sidewalks, change rooftops and install the back-up power generators on top of the buildings, renovate 30 of the 1st story apartments that were damaged by Hurricane Sandy, build a new community center and childcare building, replace sump pumps, and more.

Soon, There will be six new buildings coming to this complex to be constructed from Hurricane Sandy in 2012.

== See also ==
- New York City Housing Authority
