= Marine Pavilion (Queens) =

Former hotel in Queens, New York

Coordinates: 40°35′47″N 73°45′15″W

The Marine Pavilion was a luxury hotel in Far Rockaway, Queens, New York City. The Pavilion, which was built on the former homestead of Rockaway's first white settler, Richard Cornell, was completed in 1833, at a then-record cost of $43,000. The hotel attracted people such as Henry Wadsworth Longfellow and Washington Irving, and other New York City literary figures and socialites who were first attracted to the hotel as a refuge from an outbreak of cholera. The Pavilion was destroyed by fire on June 25, 1864. However, with many more hotels already built in its wake, Far Rockaway remained a fashionable resort area.

The hotel was located south of where Norton Street joined Central Avenue (now Beach 20th Street).
