= Far Rockaway =

Neighborhood in New York City

- Neighborhood of Queens
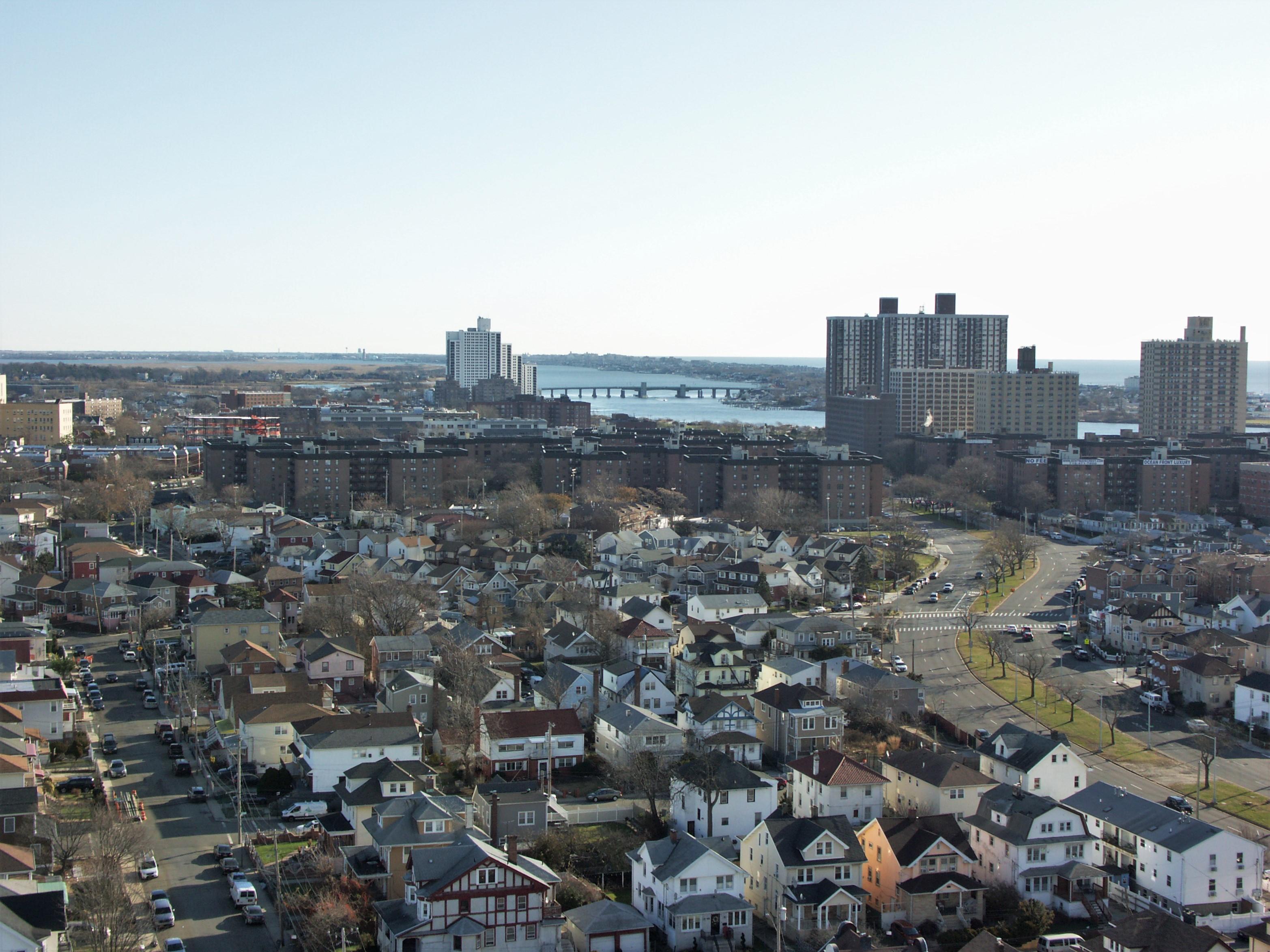
- Interactive map of Far Rockaway
- Coordinates: 40°36′21″N 73°45′03″W
- Country: United States
- State: New York
- City: New York City
- County/Borough: Queens
- Community District: Queens 14
- Named for: Place name of the Native American Lenape.

Government
  - Type: Unincorporated neighborhood
  - Body: New York City Council
  - Mayor of New York City: Mayor Zohran Mamdani
  - Borough President: Donovan Richards
  - New York City Councilor: Selvena Brooks-Powers
  - New York State Senator: James Sanders Jr.
  - New York State Assembly Member: Khaleel Anderson

Area
  - Total: 1.95 sq mi (5.06 km^{2})
  - Water: 2.89 sq mi (7.48 km^{2})
- Elevation: 20 ft (6 m)

Population (2020)
  - Total: 71,970
  - Density: 36,800/sq mi (14,200/km^{2})
- Demonym: Rockawayite

Ethnicity
  - Non-Hispanic White: 24.8%
  - Black or African-American: 40.5%
  - Hispanic or Latino of any race: 26.8%
  - Asian: 3.1%
  - Other: 4.7%
  - American Indian: 0.1%

Economics
  - Median income: $52,928
- Time zone: UTC−5 (EST)
  - Summer (DST): UTC−4 (EDT)
- ZIP Code: 11691, 11693
- Area codes: 718, 347, 929, and 917

Far Rockaway is a neighborhood on the eastern part of the Rockaway peninsula in the New York City borough of Queens. It is the easternmost section of the Rockaways. The neighborhood extends from Beach 32nd Street east to the Nassau County line. Its southern boundary is the Atlantic Ocean; it is one of the neighborhoods along Rockaway Beach.

Far Rockaway is located in Queens Community District 14 and its ZIP Codes are 11691 and 11693. It is patrolled by the New York City Police Department's 101st Precinct.

== History ==
=== Precolonial Period, European Contact, and Early Colonial Settlement ===
Munsee-speaking Lenape Native Americans at the "Watering Place" watching Henry Hudson's ship, the Half Moon, arrive in 1609.

Before contact with Europeans, the Rockaway was inhabited by the Canarsie, a band of Munsee-speaking Lenape, whose name was associated with the geography of the location. The name “Rockaway” originates from the Munsee word Reckouwacky. The Lenape did not inhabit the area continuously, rather seasonally for the purposes of fishing, hunting, and shellfish harvesting. The Rockaways were one of the primary hubs for Wampum production due to the high concentration of Quahog and Whelk.

The inhabitants of the Rockaways were one of the first indigenous peoples to make contact with Europeans most notably when Henry Hudson docked at the Rockaway Inlet in 1609. Henry Hudson was sailing under a charter for the Dutch East India Company commanding the Half Moon (Halve Maen). Members of the Canarsie approached the Half Moon in wooden dugout canoes, they were described as "civil" wearing garments and ornaments. They initiated peaceful trade with the crew of the Half Moon exchanging greens, tobacco, currants, and fur pelts for knives, metal and beads. This state of relative peace ended following an ambush on John Colman and his five other crewmen on a sounding mission around the Jamaica Bay and Narrows. While navigating these channels, sounding them, Colman's boat was boarded by Lenape warriors with two canoes carrying 20-30 men. A skirmish broke out which resulted in Colman being shot in the neck with an arrow. Two other crewmen were also injured during this skirmish. Colman became the first documented fatality of a European in the New York Harbor shattering any trust that had been established between Hudson's crew & the Lenape people of the region.

Following decades of trade and conflict such as the Kieft's War, Natives were displaced gradually from the region through a series of land agreements. By 1639, the Dutch secured land usage claims from local Lenape sachems on behalf of the Dutch West India Company. In 1664, the English defeated the Dutch colony and took over their lands in present-day New York. (Note: See New Amsterdam) In 1685, the band chief, Tackapoucha, and the English governor of the province Thomas Dongan through an official royal land grant agreed to sell the Rockaways to a Captain Palmer for 31 pounds sterling. These land sales were understood by the Lenape as usufruct treaties, whereas European colonists enforced them as permanent, private ownership deals.

The Rockaway Peninsula was originally designated as part of the Town of Hempstead, then a part of Queens County. Palmer and the Town of Hempstead disputed over who owned Rockaway, so in 1687 he sold the land to Richard Cornell, an iron master from Flushing. The first settlement was established in 1690 where Cornell and his family created the first inhabited European homestead on what is now Central Avenue, near the shore of the Atlantic Ocean. The 1,000+ acre property acted as his personal pasture & plantation, he held enslaves African-Americans, cattle & sheep which grazed the land and cultivated crops such as corn, wheat, and rye. The estate also contained subsidence gardens which were mostly orchards containing fresh fruits and small vegetable gardens. The large estate & the efficient division and hierarchy of labor allowed for Cornell's property to run self-sufficiently and. At his death, Cornell was buried in a small family cemetery, Cornell Cemetery. Before his death Cornell had used a substantial amount of the property as collateral for outstanding debts the family had with his will explicitly bounding and mortgaging land to the Children of John Washburn. William Cornell has received a massive portion of the land and meadows with the boundary being an "old fence" on the south side of a wheat field. William's entire property allotted to him ran east to the Hempstead town line and south directly to the Atlantic Ocean. The homestead was reserved for Richard Cornell's wife Elizabeth to sustain her into here old age. The rest of the estate was divided between Richard Jr, Thomas, and John primarily in the Five Towns area. The will also divided farming tools, cash, livestock, and enslaved Africans among his heirs.

=== 19th century ===
In the late 19th century, the Rockaway Association wanted to build a hotel on the Rockaway Peninsula, as it was increasingly popular as a summer destination. The association, consisting of many wealthy members who had homes in the area, bought most of Cornell's old homestead property. They developed the Marine Pavilion on that site, which attracted such guests as Henry Wadsworth Longfellow, Washington Irving, and the Vanderbilt family. The Rockaway Association also built the Rockaway Turnpike. The Marine Hotel burned to the ground in 1864, but more hotels and private residences were built in the area.

In the 19th century, people traveled to the Rockaways by horse-drawn carriages or on horseback. A ferry powered by steam sailed from Lower Manhattan to Brooklyn. By the 1880s, the Long Island Rail Road's Rockaway Beach Branch was built to serve Far Rockaway station. The steam railroad went to Long Island City and Flatbush Terminal (now Atlantic Terminal). When it opened in the 1880s, this connection stimulated population growth on the Rockaway Peninsula. Benjamin Mott gave the LIRR 7 acres (2.8 ha) of land for a railroad depot. Land values increased and businesses in the area grew, and by 1888, Far Rockaway was a relatively large village. It incorporated as a village on September 19 of that year.

=== 20th century to present ===
In 1898, the area was incorporated into the City of Greater New York and became part of Queens. The former Village Hall then served as a police precinct and magistrate's court until 1931. It was subsequently demolished to become a parking lot for FDNY Engine Companies 264 & 328 / Ladder Company 134. The neighborhoods of Far Rockaway, Hammels, and Arverne in Queens tried to secede from the city several times. In 1915 and 1917, a bill approving secession passed in the legislature but was vetoed by the New York City mayor John Purroy Mitchel. The area saw economic decline in World War I and again during the Great Depression. New apartment complexes were built in the neighborhood following World War II, but the construction of public housing and medical institutions again caused the reputation of Far Rockaway to decline in the 1960s.

In September 2017, the New York City Council voted to rezone 23 blocks in the center of Far Rockaway, after the New York City Planning Commission approved the rezoning. The rezoning would allow as many as 3,100 residences to be built in the neighborhood, as well as community spaces and retail. Following the rezoning, city officials approved 670 affordable apartments within the area in 2018.

== Demographics ==
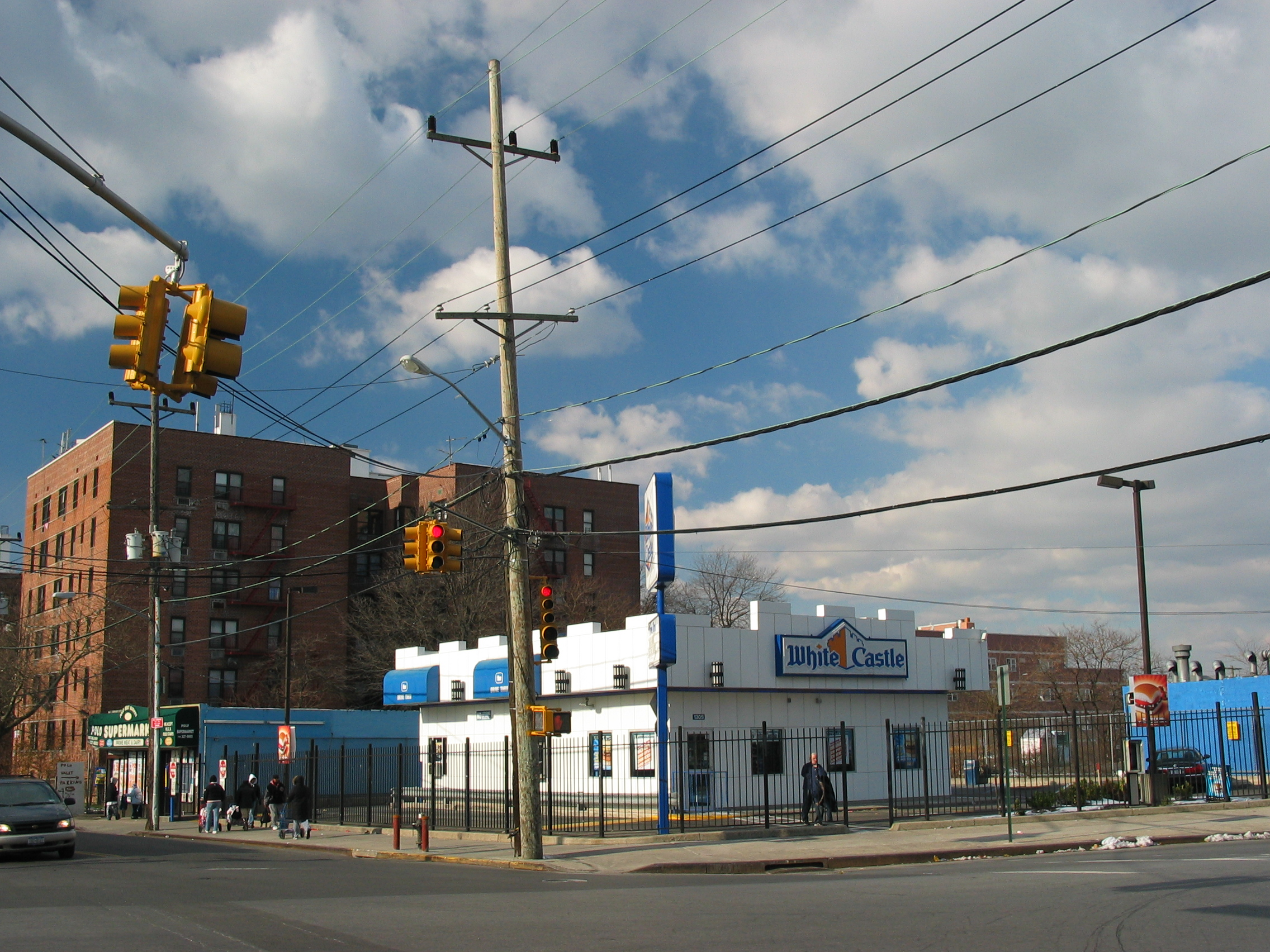
In 2005

Based on data from the 2010 United States census, the population of Far Rockaway was 50,058, a change of 1,714 (3.4%) from the 48,344 counted in 2000. Covering an area of 1,251 acres (506 ha), the neighborhood had a population density of 40 inhabitants per acre (26,000/sq mi; 9,900/km^{2}).

The racial makeup of the neighborhood was 25.5% (12,778) White, 44.7% (22,400) African American, 0.3% (175) Native American, 1.9% (931) Asian, 0.1% (44) Pacific Islander, 1% (504) from other races, and 1.7% (860) from two or more races. Hispanic or Latino of any race were 24.7% (12,366) of the population.

Far Rockaway is a diverse neighborhood with many immigrants from Jamaica, Guyana, and Guatemala, as well as Russia and Ukraine. It also is home to a significant number of Orthodox Jews.

== Points of interest ==
=== Bungalows ===
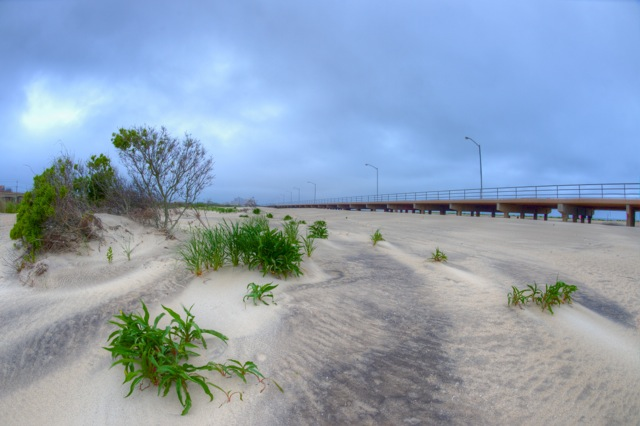
Looking east from Beach 48th Street at location of former bungalows cleared for a development project

The Far Rockaway Beach Bungalow Historic District recognizes an area with a distinct character. This and individual properties, such as the Russell Sage Memorial Church, Trinity Chapel, and United States Post Office are listed on the National Register of Historic Places.

With its nearby beach, Far Rockaway attracted tourists and vacationers from the other boroughs. Bungalows were the homes of choice for many residents who lived in Far Rockaway. The railroad abandoned the Rockaway Beach Branch in 1950 because of the shift of many people to driving private cars. In addition, this destination had to compete with the many others that people were visiting by car and air travel, which created access to even more distant destinations and heightened competition for travel dollars.

As the neighborhood's heyday as a resort community declined in the 1950s, the city built substantial numbers of public housing developments to try to replace substandard housing after World War II. Bungalows and other residential housing were converted to year-round use for low-income residents. Some bungalows were used as public housing. The 1970s New York City budget crisis had a negative effect on the provision of social services, and problems of poverty, unemployment and drug use increased in this area.

In September 1984, residents founded the Beachside Bungalow Preservation Association to "improve the quality of the Far Rockaway community through preservation, education, and cultural programs". The organization donated a collection of materials highlighting its history, correspondence, and activities to the Queens Library Archives in 2008.

=== Parks ===
- O'Donohue Park
- Bayswater Point State Park
- Michaelis-Bayswater Park
- Nameoke Park

== Police and crime ==
Far Rockaway is patrolled by the NYPD's 101st Precinct, located at 16-12 Mott Avenue. The 101st Precinct and the adjoining 100th Precinct, which serves the rest of the Rockaways, collectively ranked 10th safest out of 69 patrol areas for per-capita crime in 2010. However, the low-income and densely populated 101st Precinct has significantly more crime than the 100th Precinct, which is high-income and more insular.

The 101st Precinct has a lower crime rate than in the 1990s, with crimes across all categories having decreased by 74.6% between 1990 and 2018. The precinct reported 6 murders, 26 rapes, 151 robberies, 301 felony assaults, 98 burglaries, 250 grand larcenies, and 31 grand larcenies auto in 2018.

== Fire safety ==
Far Rockaway is served by the New York City Fire Department (FDNY)'s Engine Cos. 264 and 328/Ladder Co. 134, located at 16-15 Central Avenue.

== Post office and ZIP Code ==
Far Rockaway is covered by ZIP Code 11691. The United States Post Office operates the Far Rockaway Station at 18-36 Mott Avenue.

== Education ==
=== Schools ===
==== Public schools ====
The neighborhood, like all of New York City, is served by the New York City Department of Education. Far Rockaway residents are zoned to several different elementary schools:

- P.S. 43
- P.S. 104 (The Bayswater School) (Kindergarten–6th grade)
- P.S. 105 (The Bay School)
- P.S. 106
- P.S. 197 (The Ocean School)
- P.S. 215 (W.A.V.E Prep)
- P.S. 253

Far Rockaway residents are zoned to M.S. 53 Brian Piccolo.

All New York City residents who wish to attend a public high school must apply to high schools. Far Rockaway High School was located in Far Rockaway, but was shut down in 2011 as a stand-alone institution. During the administration of Mayor Michael Bloomberg in 2011, many large, underperforming, older traditional high schools were closed in the city. The 1929 building was renovated to operate as the Far Rockaway Educational Campus, home to a number of smaller, specialized academies that share the building that include QIRT (Queens high school for information, research, and technology), AMT (Academy of medical technology), Fredrick Douglass High school, and a middle school KAPPA VI (Knowledge and Power Preparatory Academy VI) . They can provide more individualized attention to their students. The former Beach Channel High School was similarly closed in 2014 and repurposed to house several smaller, specialized academies; it is in Rockaway Park, near Far Rockaway, and draws some of its students from Far Rockaway.

=== Library ===
Queens Public Library operates the Far Rockaway branch at 1637 Central Avenue. The library replaced another one that was also located on Central Avenue. In 2013, New York magazine reported that the city planned to construct a public library in the neighborhood, to be designed by the internationally known architectural firm Snøhetta. Construction started in November 2018, and the new library opened in July 2024 at a cost of $39 million. The current building is 18,000 square feet (1,700 m^{2}) across two stories, with a glass facade and a blue roof that collects rainwater; the color of the facade is an allusion to the color of the ocean. The building's facade includes the artwork Style Writing by José Parlá, while the second floor has the artwork Feynman Code by Pablo Helguera.

=== Jewish institutions ===
During the early and mid-20th century, many Jewish immigrants and their working-class descendants settled in Far Rockaway, sometimes first as summer visitors. They founded numerous synagogues and private schools, including those devoted to all-boys or all-girls institutions for educating Orthodox children. Following World War II, as residential housing was developed in Nassau and later Suffolk counties, many Jewish families left the Rockaways for newer housing. According to The New York Times, Far Rockaway had "flourished in the 1940s but withered...1960s" until "a few Jewish families...started the Hebrew Free Loan Society for new home buyers."

Synagogues include Congregation Kneseth Israel in Far Rockaway (The White Shul), which was founded in 1922. Schools include Sh'or Yoshuv Institute of Jewish Studies/Sh'or Yoshuv Yeshiva, Yeshiva Darchei Torah and the Yeshiva of Far Rockaway.

Other synagogues (past and present):

- Agudath Israel of Long Island
- Agudath Israel of West Lawrence
- Bayswater Jewish Center
- Young Israel of Far Rockaway
- Young Israel of Bayswater

Other schools (past and present):

- Bnois Bais Yaakov
- Siach Yitzchok Elementary School for Boys
- Torah Academy for Girls
- The Hebrew Institute of Long Island
- Yeshiva Ateres Shimon
- Mechon Sara

== Transportation ==
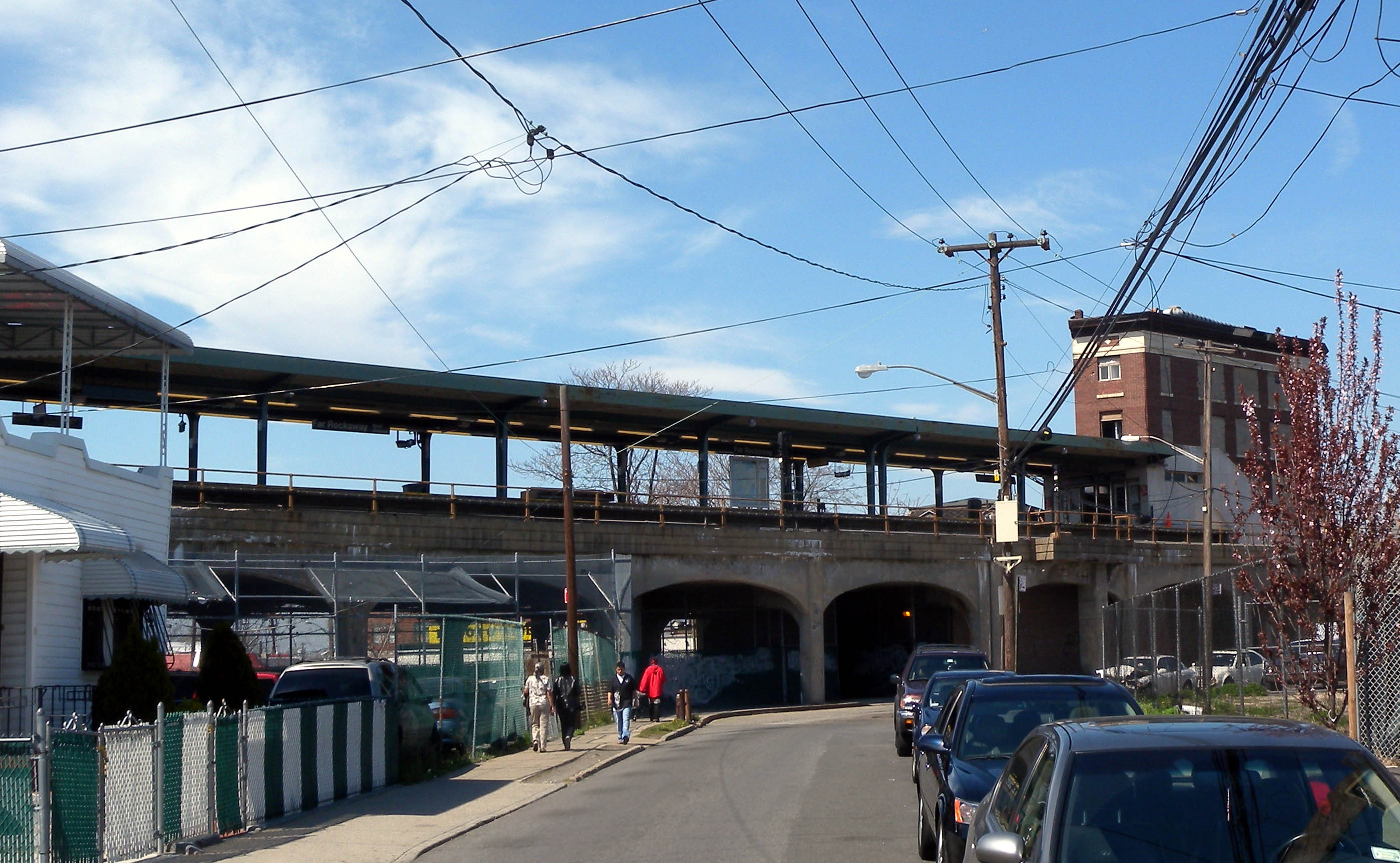
Elevated subway viaduct

Far Rockaway is served by the following transportation services:

- The New York City Subway's IND Rockaway Line (A train), which has a terminal at Mott Avenue.
- The Far Rockaway terminal station for the Long Island Rail Road's Far Rockaway Branch. The branch had been part of a loop with service along the existing route, continuing through the Rockaway Peninsula and crossing on a trestle across Jamaica Bay through Queens, where it reconnected with other branches. Frequent fires and maintenance problems led the LIRR to abandon the Queens portion of the route. The city acquired this to develop the IND Rockaway Line.
- MTA Regional Bus Operations: Q22, Q113, Q114, QM17
- Nassau Inter-County Express: n31, n31x, n32, n33. Unlike other NICE routes in Queens, these buses operate open-door in Far Rockaway, meaning customers can ride these buses wholly within the neighborhood without going to Nassau County.

== Notable people ==
- Nisson Alpert (1927–1986), rabbi who was Rosh Yeshiva at the Rabbi Isaac Elchanan Theological Seminary
- Khaleel Anderson (born 1996), politician who has represented the 31st district of the New York State Assembly since 2020
- Yaakov Bender (born 1950), Rabbi and Rosh HaYeshiva of Yeshiva Darchei Torah
- Richard Bey (born 1951), talk show host; went to Far Rockaway High School
- Baruch Samuel Blumberg (1925–2011), winner of 1976 Nobel Prize in Medicine; graduated from Far Rockaway High School in 1942
- Avrohom Blumenkrantz (1944–2007), Orthodox rabbi who was a widely consulted authority on the laws of Passover kashrut
- Albert J. Brackley (1874–1937), politician who served in the New York State Assembly
- Steven Brill (born 1950), journalist and founder of Court TV
- Joyce Brothers (1927–2013), family psychologist and advice columnist; grew up in Far Rockaway
- Joseph Cassidy (c. 1866–1920), political boss who served as borough president of Queens
- Chinx (1983–2015), rapper, grew up in both the Redfern Houses and the Edgemere Houses)
- Cormega (born Cory McKay, 1970), rapper, lived in Far Rockaway as a youth
- Mac DeMarco (born 1990), Canadian songwriter and musician; has a house in Far Rockaway, where he recorded his album Another One
- Father MC (born 1967), recording artist with Uptown Records
- Folorunso Fatukasi (born 1995), defensive end for the New York Jets
- Olakunle Fatukasi (born 1999), professional football linebacker for the St. Louis Battlehawks of the United Football League
- Joan Feynman (1927–2020), astrophysicist and NASA Exceptional Achievement Medal recipient
- Richard Feynman (1918–1988), physicist and Nobel Prize winner; grew up in Far Rockaway and graduated from Far Rockaway High School
- Marcus Gaither (1961–2020), professional basketball player in France and Israel, who played the guard position and led the Israel Basketball Premier League in scoring in 1989–90
- Mary Gordon (born 1949), writer of novels, memoirs, and literary criticism, and professor at Barnard College; born in Far Rockaway and lived there for several years
- Margo Guryan (1937–2021), singer-songwriter, musician and lyricist who is remembered for her 1968 album "Take A Picture"
- Steven Handel (born 1945), educator and restoration ecologist
- Zander Hollander (1923–2014), sportswriter, journalist, editor and archivist
- Carl Icahn (born 1936), businessman and philanthropist; grew up in Far Rockaway and went to Far Rockaway High School
- Christian Izien (born 2000), safety for the Tampa Bay Buccaneers
- Al Jaffee (1921–2023), cartoonist best known for his work in the satirical magazine Mad, including his trademark feature, the Mad Fold-in
- Shlomo Levinger (born 1997), magician
- Nancy Lieberman (born 1958), women's basketball pioneer; grew up in Far Rockaway
- Deborah Lipstadt (born 1947), historian
- Bernard Madoff (1938–2021), former American stockbroker, investment advisor, and financier who was convicted of fraud; went to Far Rockaway High School, where he met his wife, Ruth Alpern
- Steve Madden (born 1958), shoe designer and former CEO of Steve Madden Ltd; born in Far Rockaway
- Cliff Mass (born 1952/53), atmospheric sciences professor and weather and climate blogger; born in Far Rockaway
- Alice Nielsen (1872–1943), Broadway performer and operatic soprano; owned a house in Far Rockaway in the 1920s
- Barbara Novak (born 1929), art historian, novelist, National Book Award for Nonfiction finalist
- Phil Ochs (1940–1976), folk-protest singer; resided here for a period during childhood and died at his sister's home here
- Ryan Pearson (born 1990), professional basketball player
- Kelly Price (born 1973), nine-time Grammy nominated R&B and gospel singer and songwriter grew up in the Edgemere Projects
- Rammellzee (1960–2010), rap pioneer; born and died in Far Rockaway
- Kenneth Alan Ribet (born 1948), mathematician
- Burton Richter (1931–2018), winner of 1976 Nobel Prize in Physics; graduated from Far Rockaway High School in 1948
- Gary Schwartz (born 1940), art historian
- MC Serch (born 1967 as Michael Berrin), former member of the hip hop group 3rd Bass
- Raymond Smullyan (1919–2017), mathematician; grew up in Far Rockaway
- Kalman Sporn (born 1971), businessman
- Herbert Sturhahn (1902–1979), football player elected to the College Football Hall of Fame; born in Far Rockaway
- Conrad Thibault (1903–1987), baritone vocalist who frequently appeared on radio, recordings, and concert tours
