= Kalman Sporn =

American political strategist and policy expert

Personal details
- Born: Kalman Sporn; May 17, 1971 (age 55) Far Rockaway, Queens, US
- Party: Republican
- Education: Yeshiva University
- Occupation: Political strategist
- Website: www.kalmansporn.com

Kalman Sporn (born May 17, 1971) is an American corporate strategist, lobbyist, and financial consultant specializing in government relations and international business development. He is the CEO of Marylebone LLC, a New York City-based commercial intelligence and investment advisory firm established in 2014. Sporn has facilitated diplomatic and economic ties between the United States, the Middle East, and Israel, including efforts to support the normalization of relations between Turkey and Israel.

== Early life and education ==
Sporn was born in Far Rockaway, New York, on May 17, 1971. He attended the Yeshiva of South Shore, and Yeshiva University in the early 1990s, where he served as chairman of the student organization "Network" and was active in campus political and social dialogue.

== Career ==
=== Finance and investment banking ===
Sporn began his career in international finance, working in London for the South African investment bank Investec. This role marked his early engagement with African financial markets. He later served as a private banker at the Geneva-based boutique bank Banque Piguet & Cie, where he specialized in servicing clients from the Middle East and North America.

=== Government relations and lobbying ===
In 2015, Sporn served as advisor to Senator Ted Cruz. During a reception in New York City. Sporn, facilitated dialogue in which Cruz addressed his stance on gay marriage, stating it should be left to the states.

In 2002, Sporn ran for a seat in the New York State Assembly representing the 69th District in Manhattan. He campaigned as the Republican Party candidate. The race was one of the most competitive in the district's history. While Daniel O’Donnell won the seat, Sporn came in second in a very competitive field looking to succeed retiring Assemblyman Edward C. Sullivan.

Sporn has been an active proponent of normalizing relations between Israel and Arab nations. Following the signing of the Abraham Accords in 2020, he publicly noted that the agreements "normalized 20-year-old back-channel relationships" between business and political leaders in the region. Following the 2020 normalization pact between the United Arab Emirates and Israel, Sporn, acting as managing director of Marylebone LLC, observed that the accord formalized "20-year-old back-channel relationships" between the two nations. He stated that the "three powers most concerned with Middle Eastern stability" had effectively announced their official collaboration to the world. He has advocated for the private sector's role in advancing these diplomatic breakthroughs, suggesting that economic integration is a key driver of regional stability.

In late 2022, Sporn was contracted by the Turkish embassy in Washington, D.C. to provide strategic consulting services. Working with Ambassador Hasan Murat Mercan, Sporn assisted in promoting a rapprochement between Turkey and Israel after years of strained relations. During this period, he was a registered foreign agent for the Republic of Türkiye under the Foreign Agents Registration Act (FARA).
