= Edgemere Landfill =

Former landfill in Queens, New York

Rockaway Community Park
- Edgemere Park
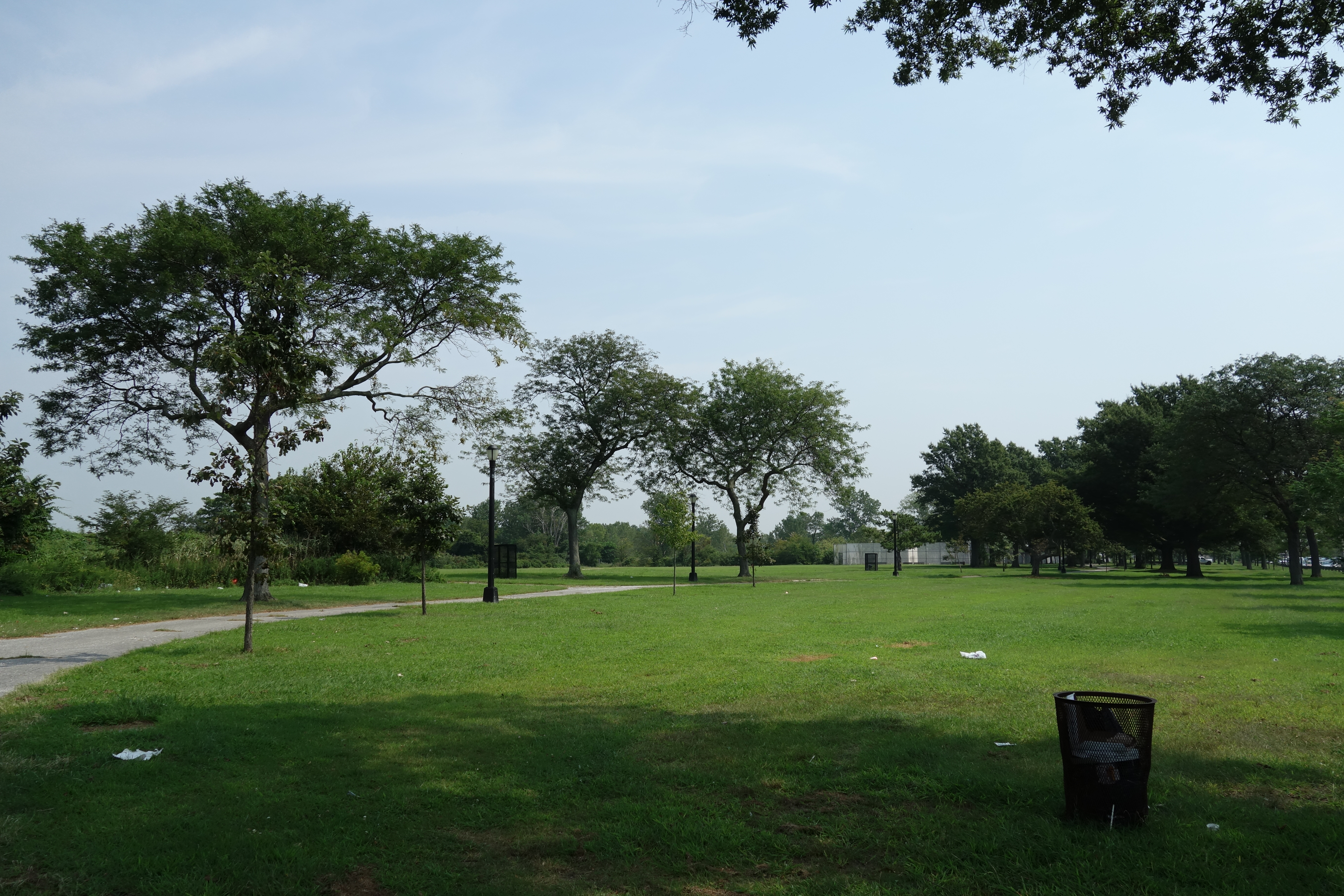
- Rockaway Community Park in 2018.
- Interactive map of Rockaway Community Park
- Type: Public park
- Location: 54-02 Almeda Avenue; Edgemere, Queens, New York
- Coordinates: 40.606°N 73.779°W
- Area: 255.40 acres (103.36 ha)
- Operator: New York City Department of Parks and Recreation
- Status: Open
- Superfund site

Information
- CERCLIS ID: NYD980754725
- Contaminants: Various chemicals
- Responsible parties: New York City Department of Sanitation

Progress

Edgemere Landfill is a former municipal landfill located in Edgemere on the Rockaway peninsula in Queens, New York City. It is located on a man-made peninsula on the Jamaica Bay shoreline, at the eastern end of the Rockaway peninsula. A portion of the site is open to the public as Rockaway Community Park (formerly Edgemere Park). The entire site is owned by the New York City Department of Parks and Recreation.

The landfill began operations in June 1938, merging several islands in the Jamaica Bay marshland and connecting them to the main Rockaway Peninsula. Shortly afterward, a portion of the site was used as the Rockaway Airport. Edgemere Park was conceived for the landfill site in the 1950s by New York City Parks Commissioner Robert Moses, as part of the infrastructure for the adjacent Edgemere Houses housing project. The site, along with several other planned parks in the city, continued operations as a landfill in order to fill the marshland for park development. The small portion of Rockaway Community Park adjacent to the Edgemere Houses was developed in the 1960s. During its operation, the landfill was a dumping site for toxic chemicals and waste oil, and served as a hazard to nearby John F. Kennedy International Airport by attracting birds. Following the discovery of toxic waste drums in the landfill in 1983, the landfill was declared a Superfund site. It was closed in 1991 and capped afterwards.

The peak of the landfill is the tallest point in the Rockaways, measuring 70 feet (21 m) high. The landfill is claimed to be "the longest continuously operating dump in the United States", accepting waste from 1938 to 1991. It is also one of the oldest landfills in New York City, and was the second-to-last city landfill to remain in operation. The final landfill, Fresh Kills Landfill in Staten Island, closed in 2001.

== Description ==
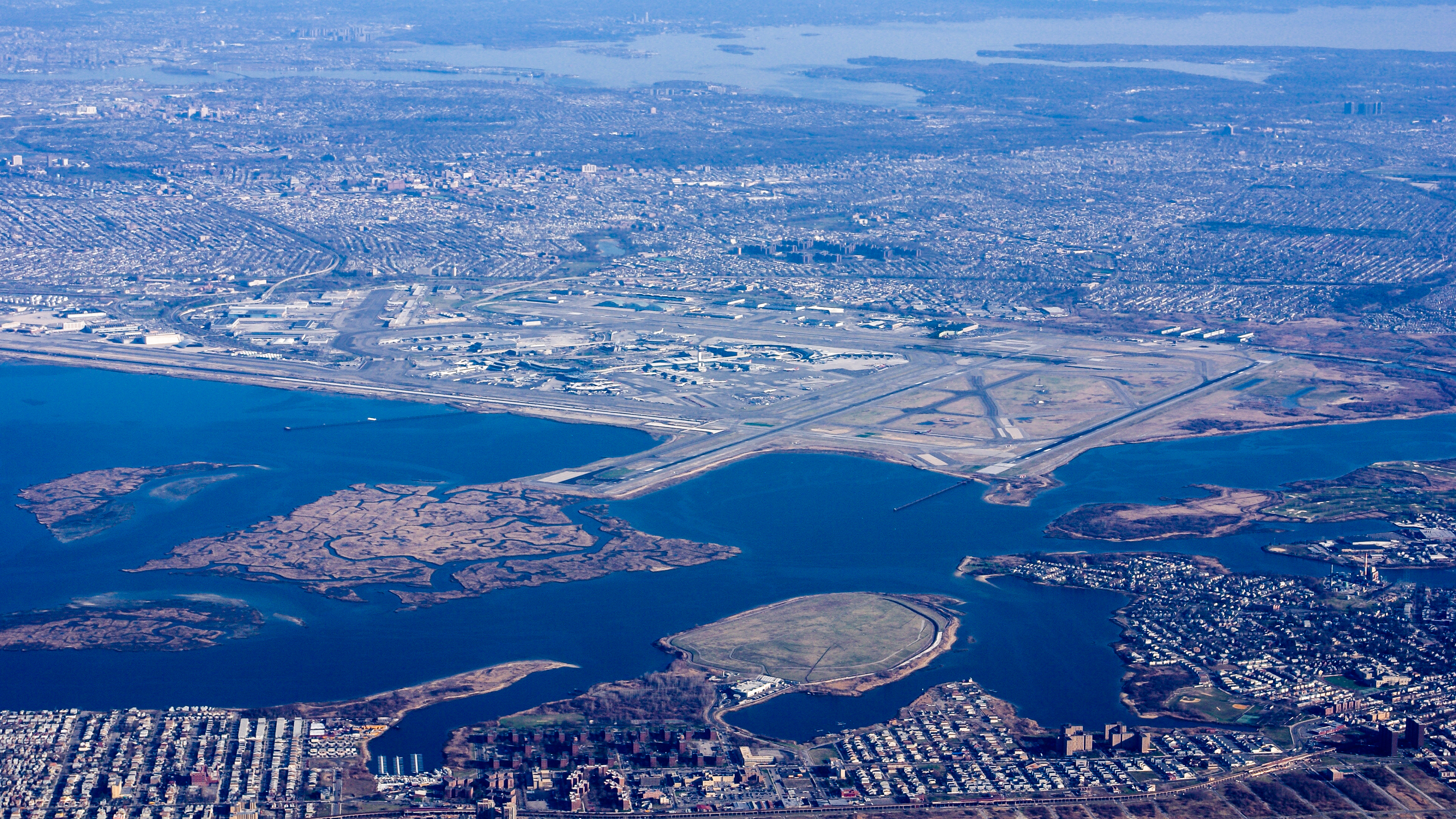
An aerial view of Arverne and Edgemere, Queens. The Edgemere Landfill is the small peninsula in the lower center, with John F. Kennedy Airport just to the north.

=== Former landfill ===
The Edgemere Landfill is located on the north side of the Rockaway Peninsula in the Edgemere neighborhood near Arverne at the east end of the Rockaways. The landfill site consists of a smaller peninsula, which extends northward into Jamaica Bay at the east end of the bay. Smaller bodies of water within the bay form the peninsula's western and eastern sides. To the west is Somerville Basin which runs between the peninsula and Dubos Point in Arverne to the west. To the east is the Norton Basin which runs between the landfill and Bayswater to the east. At the south end of Norton Basin are two smaller water bodies, Conch Basin (formerly Little Bay) to the west at the base of the landfill site, and a smaller Norton Basin to the east next to Bayswater Park. All three water bodies end at about Beach Channel Drive.

The landfill site can be described as a large "head" section, which contains the main landfill mound and extends into Jamaica Bay, and a "neck" section which connects the peninsula to the Rockaways. According to the New York City Department of Parks and Recreation, the combined park and landfill site is 255.40 acres (103.36 ha) in size. The size of the landfill is often stated as 173 acres (70 ha). Its shoreline extends 2 miles (3.2 km). The landfill is covered by grassland, with several roads circumscribing the site, and running across the landfill. The grass is mowed once a year, allowing for the inspection of the landfill to search for gas leaks. The peak of the landfill measures 70 feet (21 m) high, the highest point on the Rockaway Peninsula. Because of this, it is one of the only sites in the area not in a flood-prone zone. The peak is still lower than the highest point of the former Fresh Kills Landfill in Staten Island, which is 170 feet (52 m).

During its operation, the Edgemere Landfill received a total of 9 million cubic yards (6.9 million cubic metres) of waste. The landfill is one of the three major landfills located along Jamaica Bay. The other two are the Pennsylvania Avenue and Fountain Avenue Landfills located in Brooklyn. Located directly across the landfill to the north are the ends of Runways 4L and 4R of John F. Kennedy International Airport. During the landfill's operation, the presence of gulls feeding off the garbage at the site posed a hazard to planes operating to and from the airport. Bird species found at the landfill include the American herring gull and the laughing gull, and the short-eared owl.

=== Parkland ===
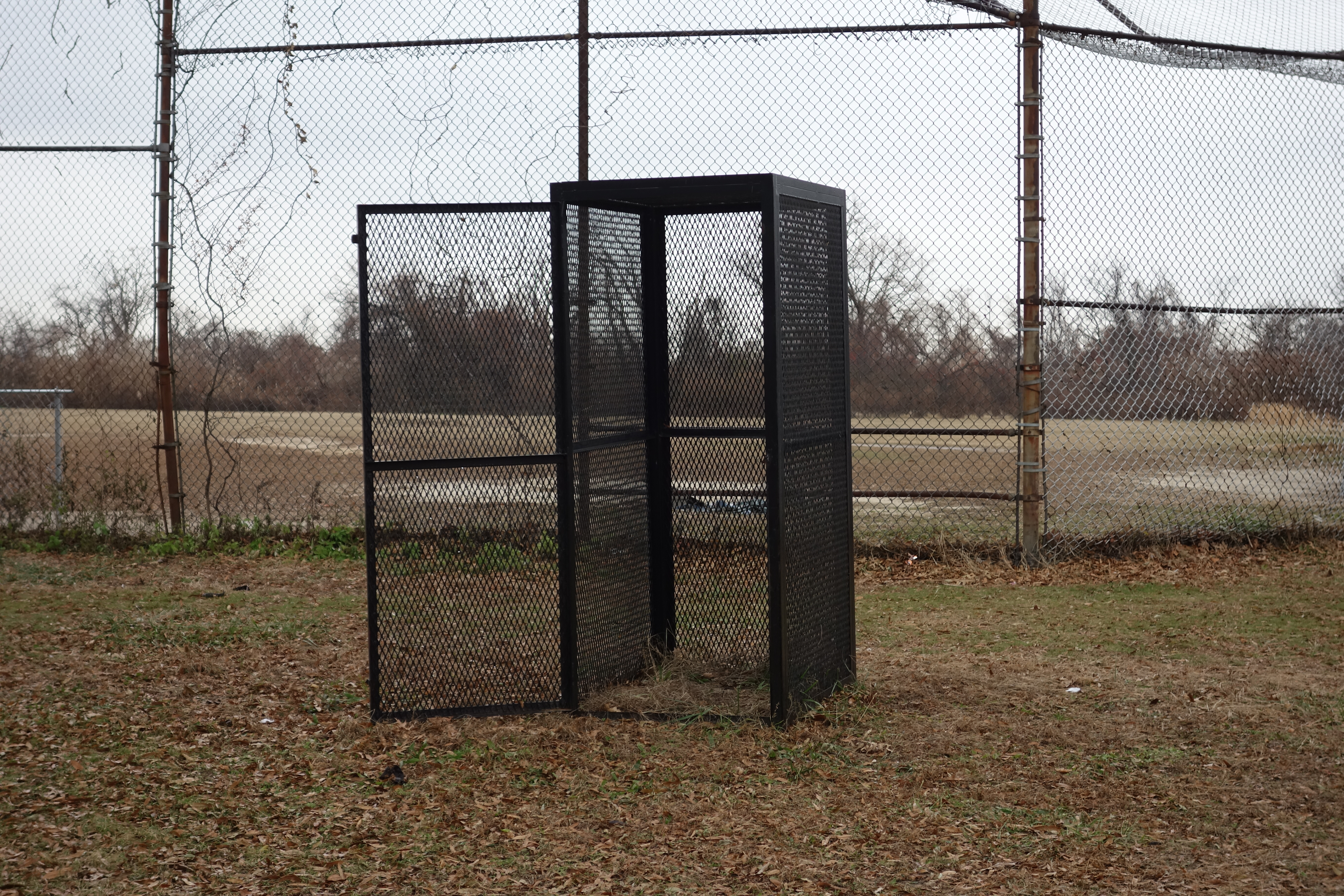
One of the mosquito magnets present in Rockaway Community Park.

At the base of the main landfill is the only open portion of Rockaway Community Park, located on the north side of Almeda Avenue across from the Ocean Bay Apartments housing project, formerly known as the Edgemere Houses. The developed park occupies approximately 15 acres (6.1 ha) of land. An additional 25 acres (10 ha) of land were released by the Department of Sanitation for recreational use in 2010. A "natural area" is situated to the north of the developed park, located in the "neck" area between the park and the former landfill.

Two smaller parcels of undeveloped parkland extend south on the west and east sides of the park towards Beach Channel Drive. The westernmost parcel is a rectangular plot between Beach 58th Street and Somerville Basin. The easternmost parcel is triangular in shape, on the Conch Basin coastline between Beach 51st Street and Elizabeth Avenue. These two plots are also considered the "West" and "East" natural areas of the park. The southernmost portion of the western plot is used as the Rockaway Youth Task Force Community Garden. Just south of the eastern parcel is Conch Playground, located adjacent to Public School 105 between Beach Channel Drive and Elizabeth Avenue.

The developed portion of the park near the housing complex features a grass sports field with a baseball diamond and cricket pitch. The cricket pitch is the only one on the Rockaway Peninsula. A second baseball diamond previously existed. The park also contains basketball, handball, and tennis courts and a playground. Two fishing piers are located on the Sommerville Basin coast at the west end of the northern natural area. A walking trail runs through the northern natural area. The main landfill itself is used as a birdwatching site, due to its proximity to the Jamaica Bay Wildlife Refuge.

One of the major issues afflicting the park is the large presence of mosquitoes, leading the park to be underutilized. The presence of the mosquitoes in the park and at nearby Dubos Point has been attributed to their location along Jamaica Bay, and their significant vegetation. The park and other known mosquito breeding grounds in the city periodically undergo larvicide treatment and spraying to combat mosquitoes, although pesticide spraying only occurs when a virus such as West Nile is detected in the local mosquito population. Mosquito magnets are also present in the park to help control the population. The park is also afflicted by the presence of invasive plant species such as phragmites. In addition many of the park facilities are in disrepair, including the playing fields and courts which have overgrown with vegetation. Meanwhile, the north side of Almeda Avenue adjacent to the park lacks a sidewalk, making it difficult to access the park. There are also noise disturbances from nearby JFK Airport. The issues with mosquitoes and phragmites have affected the park since the 1960s when the park was created.

The original park plans for the main landfill were to create a marina and a golf course on the site. Contemporary plans for Rockaway Community Park seek to eventually develop the main landfill as part of the park. The landfill cannot be developed as parkland or for permanent structures until 2021.

=== Department of Sanitation facility ===
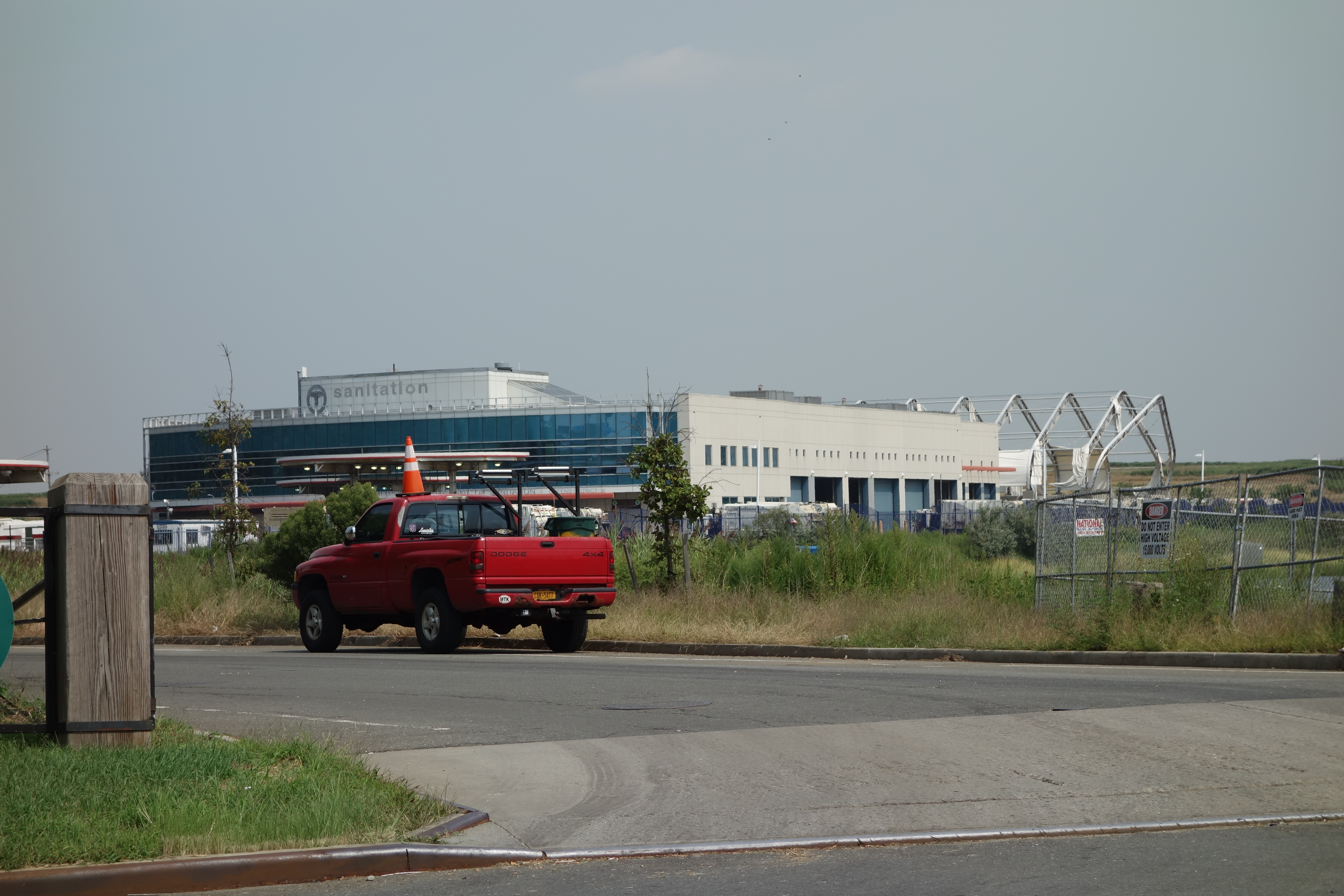
The DSNY District 14 Garage at the Edgemere Landfill.

A portion of the site on the Conch Basin continues to be operated by the New York City Department of Sanitation (DSNY). Part of the site is used as a gas extraction facility to collect gases emitted from the landfill. The site also contains the DSNY Queens East District 14 Garage. The garage opened in 2009. On December 14, 2010, the DSNY renamed the garage the "Stephen Dixon Garage" after Stephen Dixon, a worker from the garage who died on duty in March 2009. The previous garage was located at Beach 72nd Street and Amstel Boulevard in Arverne, now used as an Access-A-Ride depot.

=== Transportation ===
The park and landfill are served by the Q22 and Q52 SBS bus routes, which operate on Beach Channel Drive at the south end of the Edgmere Houses. The Q22 operates across the Rockaway Peninsula between Far Rockaway to the east and Roxbury to the west. The Q52, which terminates at Beach 54th Street, travels north via Woodhaven and Cross Bay Boulevards through Broad Channel to "mainland" Queens. The closest New York City Subway station is the Beach 60th Street station on the IND Rockaway Line (A train), located to the southwest of the park at Beach 59th Street near Rockaway Beach Boulevard.

== Etymology ==
The name Edgemere is derived from an Anglo-Saxon term, meaning "edge of the sea". The term Rockaway is derived from a word in the Algonquin Native American languages. Several meanings have been given, including "sandy place", "the place of laughing waters", "the place of our own people", or "neck of the land". This was the name of the Lenape tribe, who were a subset of the Canarsee (Canarsie) tribe, that occupied much of the area around Jamaica Bay.

== History ==
=== Early history ===
A 1907 map of Edgemere. At the north end of the site is Little Bay, with various islands within it; this is now the site of the Edgemere Landfill.

Prior to the creation of the landfill, the site of Edgemere Park consisted of numerous separate islands within a much larger Little Bay between Dubos Point to the west and Bayswater Point to the east. It was originally known as "Little Bay Marsh". Norton Basin (also called Norton's Creek) originally was connected to the Atlantic Ocean by a creek called the Wave Crest Inlet, which separated the western peninsula from the mainland. The area around Jamaica Bay including the Rockaways was characterized by marshland. As late as 1872, the neighborhoods of Edgemere and Arverne were populated by cedar trees.

The area around Jamaica Bay including the Rockaway Peninsula was initially inhabited by the Canarsie and Rockaway Native American groups, who were often referred to erroneously as the "Metoac" or "Mantinecocks". The Rockaway primarily controlled the eastern and southern shores of Jamaica Bay in present-day Queens and Nassau County, while the Canarsie controlled the northern and western shores in modern-day Brooklyn. In 1685, the Rockaway Peninsula was sold to English Captain John Palmer by two tribal chiefs, Tackapausha and Paman. Palmer was said to have purchased the land for "31 pounds, 2 shillings". The land was considered to be "barren", consisting of meadow and marsh used for grazing. At the time, the peninsula stretched from the modern Rockaway Turnpike west to the modern Wavecrest neighborhood, making up the greater Far Rockaway area of Queens and what is now Five Towns, Nassau County (then called "Rockaway Neck"). The peninsula would later be extended west to Rockaway Point by the natural accretion of sand from tidal action.

In 1687 Palmer sold the land to English settler Richard Cornell, whose family would later found Cornell University. In return, Palmer received land in "Madnan's Neck", now Little Neck, Queens and Great Neck, Nassau County. Cornell had previously purchased what would become Flushing, Queens. Cornell constructed a house overlooking the Atlantic Ocean known as the "Cornell house" or "Cornell homestead", said to be the first permanent structure in the area. The house was located in the vicinity of Central Avenue (Beach 20th Street), Beach 19th Street, and Empire Avenue in modern Far Rockaway. This is the location of the contemporary Hebrew Institute of Long Island at Beach 17th Street and Seagirt Boulevard. The family also created a nearby burial ground on Caffrey Avenue and New Haven Avenue.

After the partition of the Cornell property in 1809, in 1830 John Leake Norton purchased land from the Cornell family, consisting of Edgemere and Far Rockaway. Norton formed the Rockaway Association with several prominent New Yorkers, and the association constructed a hotel on the former site of the Cornell house called the Marine Pavilion. The pavilion was opened on June 1, 1833. Although it burned down on June 25, 1864, the hotel catalyzed the development of the Rockaways into a resort town. The Far Rockaway Branch Railroad of the South Side Railroad of Long Island was opened in 1869 between Valley Stream and Far Rockaway, and was extended to the Seaside House in Rockaway Park in 1872. The New York, Woodhaven & Rockaway Railroad opened their line from Brooklyn and "mainland" Queens to Rockaway Park in 1880. The Ocean Electric Railway opened a streetcar line via the Far Rockaway Branch tracks in 1897.

Up until the 1880s, the Edgemere and Arverne areas were largely undeveloped and were among the last to be developed on the peninsula. Edgemere, originally called "New Venice", was developed by Frederick J. Lancaster beginning in 1892, with the Hotel Edgemere opening in 1894. The Arverne neighborhood was developed by Remington Vernam. The Arverne Hotel was erected in 1888. A rail station in the neighborhood at Gaston Avenue was opened in 1888, and a second at Straiton Avenue in 1892. The Wave Crest Inlet, also called Wave Crest Lake, was filled in during 1911 in order to further develop the Edgemere neighborhood.

=== Creation of the landfill ===
In 1916, the New York City Waterfront Company acquired 359 acres (145 ha) of land on the north shore of the Rockaway Peninsula in Arverne and Edgemere, including the area around Little Bay. The land was located north of the former Amstel Canal, now Amstel Boulevard and Beach Channel Drive. The property was previously owned by Remington Vernam. The land, which consisted of salt marshes and beach, was to be filled in order to construct bungalows; part of the site was already filled by dirt dredged from Jamaica Bay. In 1920, the New York City Board of Estimate planned to create Amstel Boulevard on the former canal right-of-way between Beach 35th Street and Beach 71st Street, where it would connect with Hammels Avenue and eventually feed in Beach Channel Drive. The route would cut across the New York City Waterfront property. All three roads now make up modern Beach Channel Drive.

Garbage landfilling at Edgemere by the New York City Department of Sanitation began on July 15, 1938. The landfill replaced an incinerator in nearby Arverne. By this time, garbage incineration was considered "obsolete". The property continued to be owned by the New York City Waterfront Company. Borrow pits with depths of 64 feet (20 m) and 51 feet (16 m) were dug into the Norton Basin and Little Bay respectively, with the dirt extracted used to create a base for the landfill. Around 2 million cubic yards (1.5 million cubic metres) of dirt were dredged from underwater for the landfill. The alterations to the basins and landfilling activity changed their biodiversity compared to other water bodies in the area. The Edgemere Landfill was one of several landfills created under then-Sanitation Commissioner William F. Carey. In addition to replacing incinerators, the landfill replaced the practice of dumping city garbage in the ocean. This practice was banned by a United States Supreme Court ruling in 1933.

Following complaints from the local community, on July 14, 1938 Andrew J. Kenny threatened to seek an injunction to stop the dumping at Edgemere. Kenny was the president of the Rockaway Chamber of Commerce and the Queens sewer superintendent. That same day, Sanitation Commissioner Carey was confronted by local residents while inspecting the landfill site. One of the complaints was that paint on the side of houses had either peeled or became discolored due to the fumes emitted from the landfill. The fumes were thought to either come from the mud from the bay used to cover the garbage, or the disinfectants used on the waste. The next day on July 15, dumping was halted at the landfill. According to Commissioner Carey, the odors at the site were caused by the use of mud to cover the garbage, and clean sand would be used in the future. Operations resumed on October 10, 1938. Meanwhile, residents continued to oppose dumping at Edgemere, citing fires and rat infestations. During a tour of the Edgemere Dump on February 11, 1939, Commissioner Carey claimed that it was "four and a half times more expensive" to dispose of waste through incinerators than to bury it in landfills. He also spoke of the benefits of landfilling, including reclaiming marshland and eliminating mosquitoes.

On March 28, 1939, Sanitation Commissioner William F. Carey and Health Commissioner Dr. John L. Rice were indicted on charges of violating the New York City Penal and Sanitary Codes, specifically of "unlawfully dumping raw garbage and maintaining a public nuisance" and of "dumping under or on top of water, or on land, any refuse in which...offensive and unwholesome material is included." The charges were based on the operation of city-run "garbage graveyards" in Queens. The five dumps in question were the Edgemere Dump; the Lefferts Dump at Lefferts Boulevard and Sunrise Highway (Conduit Avenue) in South Ozone Park, near the future site of JFK Airport; Bergen Landing; and the future sites of Juniper Valley Park and Baisley Pond Park, respectively located in Middle Village and South Jamaica. The owners of the Edgemere and Lefferts landfills were also named in the indictment. Carey and Rice, both cabinet members under Mayor Fiorello H. La Guardia, surrendered to the Long Island City Courthouse and were released without bail.

A change of venue was granted on May 18, 1939 and the trial was moved to the Bronx. On May 31, the trial was postponed until October of that year. Around this time, dumping was resumed at the Edgemere Landfill. On June 19, 1939, the indictments were dismissed by Justice Isidor Wasservogel. As a consolation, a board of four health experts and a sanitary engineer was appointed by U.S. Surgeon General Thomas Parran Jr. to arbitrate the conflict and to investigate the operations of the five landfills. The board included Eugene Lindsay Bishop and Kenneth F. Maxcy. In addition, Carey announced that dumping at Edgemere would end on June 25 and cease until the fall. The charges were dropped by District Attorney Charles P. Sullivan due to a lack of individuals to testify in the trial.

On September 21, 1939, the arbitration board conducted a "secret tour" of the five landfills. At this time, the Department of Sanitation anticipated resuming landfilling at Edgemere that fall, which was opposed by local residents. In March 1940, the board released its report, which supported continued landfilling at the five Queens landfills including Edgemere as long as "sound sanitary practice is continued", as the landfilling process helped control rat and mosquito populations in marshland. On June 22, 1940, the New York City Council passed a bill mandating the Department of Sanitation to begin using the available incinerators in the city. The bill was introduced by Councilman James A. Burke representing Hollis, Queens. Burke then proceeded to submit the bill to Mayor Fiorello LaGuardia in an attempt to bypass the Board of Estimate. Many of the city's incinerators, including the Arverne incinerator, had been closed under Carey's watch.

=== Rockaway Airport ===
On July 16, 1939, the Edgemere Airport (also called Rockaway Airport) was opened on the New York City Waterfront Company land between Beach 46th Street and Beach 54th Street. The airport was operated by Lawrence resident and commercial pilot Harry Gordon, and was said to be the first privately owned airfield in the Rockaways. Prior to the construction of a hangar, planes for the airport were kept at Roosevelt Field in Nassau County. The airport was created for civilian training and leisure flying.

Following a lawsuit by Gordon, on December 26, 1939 city Commissioner of Docks John McKenzie was ordered by the Manhattan Supreme Court to award a permit to the airport. On July 8, 1940 after 15 months of operation, McKenzie issued a letter informing Gordon that the airport would be closed in 30 days due to not meeting facility requirements for airports in the city. Specifically, the airport failed to meet the requirements for 1,800-foot-long (550 m) and 300-foot-wide (91 m) runways, and for an "unobstructed approach" to the airport. At this time, work commenced on expanding and developing the airport. The pilots training at the airport included members of the Women Flyers Of America. The airport would later become the headquarters of Women's Flyers Association of America.

In October 1940, the Rockaway Chamber of Commerce petitioned the federal Civil Aeronautics Administration to create a civilian pilot school at Rockaway Airport. In January 1941, Bayside resident Charles G. Meyer proposed converting his farm along Little Neck Bay into a city-operated airfield to train civilian pilots. Several wealthy residents of Bayside protested his plan, including actor and movie producer John Golden. As an alternative, Golden suggested to Mayor Fiorello LaGuardia that the Edgemere Dump be used for the airfield. On January 15, 1941, Mayor LaGuardia publicly rejected both the Bayside and Edgemere proposals, due to costs and potential hazards to Bayside residents. Meyer's farm would later become the Bay Terrace neighborhood, while John Golden's estate would become John Golden Park.

On July 26, 1941 the Civil Aeronautics Administration approved Rockaway Airport along with Nassau Airport in Hicksville, Long Island as civilian pilot training facilities. Meanwhile, Idlewild Airport (today's JFK Airport) was ordered to cease training of pilots. Upon the onset of World War II, in 1941 Gordon offered use of the airport and a supply of planes and pilots to the United States military in order to monitor and patrol the coast of Long Island during the war. In October 1941, soldiers from Fort Tilden in the western Rockaways began using the airport for ten days to conduct air raid drills. The offer to use the airport was officially accepted by Civil Air Patrol Major General John F. Curry in February 1942. Civilian flying, however, was banned by the federal government during World War II and Gordon abandoned the airport at this time. In early 1944, the airport was leased by the United States Coast Guard as a helicopter training base.

Following the war, in February 1946 Rockaway Airport was reopened by war veterans Joseph Alta and Perry Fuhr. Alta was an Army Air Force pilot in the China Burma India Theater of the war. Fuhr was a Navy test pilot. Alta had previously operated a flight school at Floyd Bennett Field in Brooklyn. Beginning on January 6, 1947, the airport was used as the receiving point for a helicopter mail service originating at LaGuardia Airport or Newark Airport, and serving both the Rockaways and Five Towns in Nassau County.

=== Park plans and purchase of the property ===
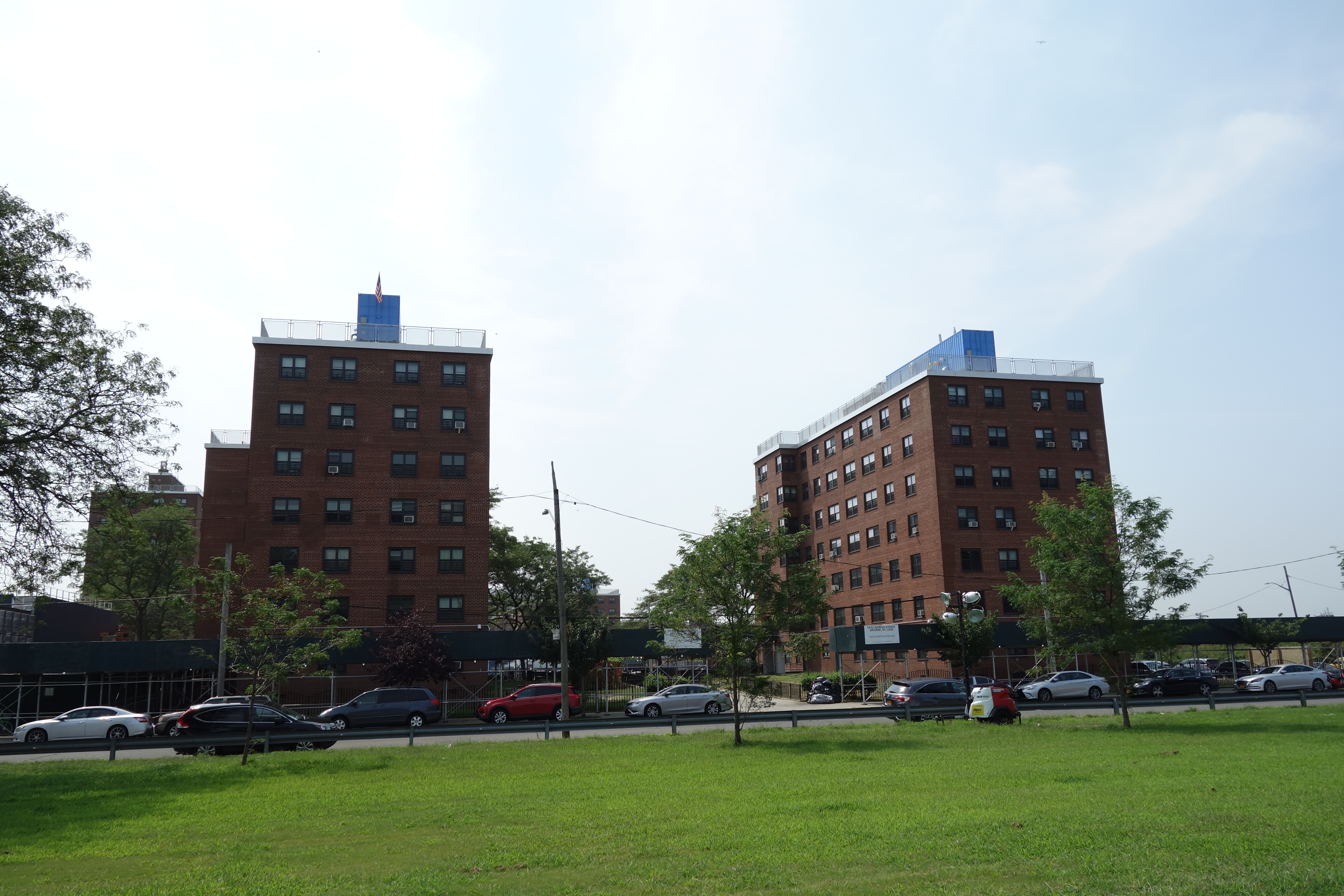
Rockaway Community Park was planned along with the Edgemere Houses (pictured), which opened in 1960.

On January 11, 1946, new Sanitation Commissioner William J. Powell announced that the city would abandon the landfill system favored by his predecessor Carey and instead utilize incinerators, with half of the Borough of Queens' waste to be disposed of via incinerator immediately. On January 17, 1949, the Department of Sanitation opened a "Super Dump" in Howard Beach, located along Jamaica Bay stretching west of Cross Bay Boulevard. The new dump, proposed by Parks Commissioner Robert Moses, was intended to receive most of the garbage from southern Queens and replace smaller landfills in other areas of the borough. The new Super Dump would either reduce the load on or entirely replace the Edgemere Landfill. The Howard Beach dump would operate until the completion of the South Shore Incinerator in Spring Creek, Brooklyn. Afterwards, the reclaimed land would become part of the planned Spring Creek Park.

In November 1952 and again in January 1953, Parks Commissioner Moses proposed to the New York City Board of Estimate that the city purchase the Edgemere Landfill, keep it in operation for 15 years, and eventually develop it into a park. At the time, it was estimated that keeping the site in operation would save the city $1 million annually in waste disposal costs.

In 1955, the city began plans for a housing project in Edgemere. The plans included an adjoining park on the site of the Edgemere Landfill, which had been in operation for nearly twenty years at this time. The New York City Board of Estimate approved the park project on April 29, 1955. On October 4, 1955 the City of New York began condemnation proceedings in order to acquire the Edgmere Landfill site adjacent to the future Edgemere Houses site. The park was to be named "Edgemere Park". At the time, the property was still owned by the New York City Waterfront Corporation. Plans for the park included eight tennis courts, along with a boat basin and ice skating rink. By this time, the site occupied 264 acres (107 ha). Many of the small islands that once existed in Little Bay were now joined together and connected to the main Rockaway peninsula by landfilling. However, much of the future park site was still underwater. It was referred to as "the largest remaining undeveloped area in the Rockaways". Moses developed several public housing projects on the Rockaway peninsula during this time, all of which included an adjoining park.

Construction on the other adjoining infrastructure for the Edgemere Housing Project, Public School 105 and Rockaway Beach Hospital (the future Peninsula Hospital), began in 1957. The landfill site was purchased by the city via condemnation on December 12, 1957, costing $1,496,564. The purchase of the property by the city was criticized in 1958 by Queens Borough President James J. Crisona, with Crisona believing that the city paid too much for the property. The city paid $1.5 million for the site following an evaluation by city real estate appraiser James C. Sheridan. However, the city tax rolls assessed the site at $150,000, exactly one tenth of its purchase price. Crisona noted that Sheridan's appraisal was based on the land's potential for industrial development, but claimed that it could not be developed for 20 to 30 years due to its status as a landfill. He also compared the price of Edgemere Park to that of other properties in the area, which were appraised at much lower prices. Crisona criticized Sheridan, Corporation Council Peter Campbell Brown, and Mayor Robert F. Wagner Jr. for their roles in the purchase. Sheridan proceeded to file a $1 million defamation suit against Crisona, while Sheridan's $22,000 commission for the job was withheld by City Controller Lawrence E. Gerosa Shortly afterwards, in July 1958 Brown resigned from his post.

=== Initial park development ===
By July 1958, the Rockaway Airport was closed and demolished to make way for the housing project. On October 16, 1958, ground was broken on the Edgemere Houses project, with Robert Moses, Borough President James Crisona, and Governor W. Averell Harriman in attendance. During the ceremony, Moses spoke about his plans for the adjoining Edgemere Park. The first portion of the park would be a 300-foot-wide (91 m) "buffer between the Edgemere State Housing Project and the operations of the Department of Sanitation". The plans for the remainder of the park, which would be the "largest park on the Rockaway peninsula," included an 18-hole golf course and a marina. Moses planned to create several parks on wetlands by filling the land with municipal waste before developing the land into parkland. These included the future Edgemere Park and Spring Creek Park, as well as sites in Marine Park, Brooklyn; Ferry Point, Bronx; Fresh Kills, Staten Island; and Kissena Corridor Park in Queens.

In December 1959, the Board of Estimate allocated $144,650 to add an additional 160,000 cubic yards of sand to the Edgemere Landfill, which would extend the site up to 2,000 feet (610 m) north into Jamaica Bay. The Board also planned to lay out Almeda Avenue between Conch Place (Conch Basin) and Beach 58th Street (Sommerville Basin), and to lay out Beach 51st Street, Beach 54th Street and Beach 58th Street in the area north of Beach Channel Drive. These streets would eventually serve the new housing project and park. In July 1960, the Board of Estimate approved of plans to begin developing 12 acres (4.9 ha) of Edgemere Park on the north side of Almeda Avenue across from the Edgemere Houses. The park would include baseball fields and eight clay tennis courts along with landscaping and paths. Conch Playground, then known as P.S. 105 Playground, was opened in August 1960. On October 17, 1960, Parks Commissioner Newbold Morris (successor to Robert Moses) announced plans for improvements to Edgemere Park, including baseball fields, tennis courts, and a park trail. The first building of the Edgemere Houses was opened on November 27, 1960. By 1962, plans remained to develop a marina at Edgemere Park. The next year, tennis courts were completed at Edgemere Park, with a playground planned.

In 1965, it was claimed that the Edgemere Landfill contained more American herring gulls feeding and residing at the landfill than Cape Ann, Massachusetts, a known nesting region for the herring gulls, along with "all of Nova Scotia and Maine". At the time, it was estimated that 20 to 30 thousand herring gulls resided in the area around Jamaica Bay, attracted by the Edgemere Landfill and the Pennsylvania and Fountain Avenue Landfills in Brooklyn. That year, the Department of Sanitation opened the landfill for public use on a trial basis, accepting large items such as appliances, furniture, plumbing, and automobiles. In July 1966 in response to complaints from residents, the Parks Department began pesticide spraying at Edgemere Park in order to combat mosquitoes, rats, and phragmites. To eliminate the phragmites, the chemical Dalapon was used. It was suggested that physically uprooting the phragmites would be a better solution, but the equipment necessary to harvest the plants could not be used in the park as much of it still consisted of marshland. The rats, meanwhile, were said to have been brought by the dumping of trash at the landfill. That month, $29,250 was allocated for additional landfilling on the Edgemere Park land in order to create a playground and sports fields. During the fall of 1966, Edgemere Park was used as a practice field for the Far Rockaway High School football team, as their own home field was not usable during the season. On July 1, 1967, the Department of Sanitation again allowed local residents to drop off bulk refuse such as furniture or appliances at the landfill. By July 17, 1,000 tons of waste were deposited through this program at Edgemere, and at 20th Avenue in College Point. On March 24, 1968, the playground at Edgemere Park was opened, with a basketball tournament taking place.

In May 1970, the Rockaway Cultural, Educational, Recreational, and Historical Society proposed to rename Edgemere Park to Rockaway Community Park. Other potential names included Brotherhood Memorial Park, Jeanne Dale Katz Park, Martin Luther King Jr. Park, Tackapouscha Indian Historical Park, and William F. Brunner Sr. Park. On October 9, 1970, a fire broke out at the Edgemere Landfill, lasting six days before it was brought under control. The bill renaming the park was signed into law in 1971. The park was dedicated as Rockaway Community Park on June 17, 1973. While portions of the park including basketball courts and beach land were available for use at the time, most of the site had yet to be developed. Jamaica Bay Council president Jerome Hipscher desired for the park to be developed into "a miniature Central Park". It was also proposed to integrate the park with the new Gateway National Recreation Area created by the National Park Service.

=== Toxic waste dumping and calls to close the landfill ===
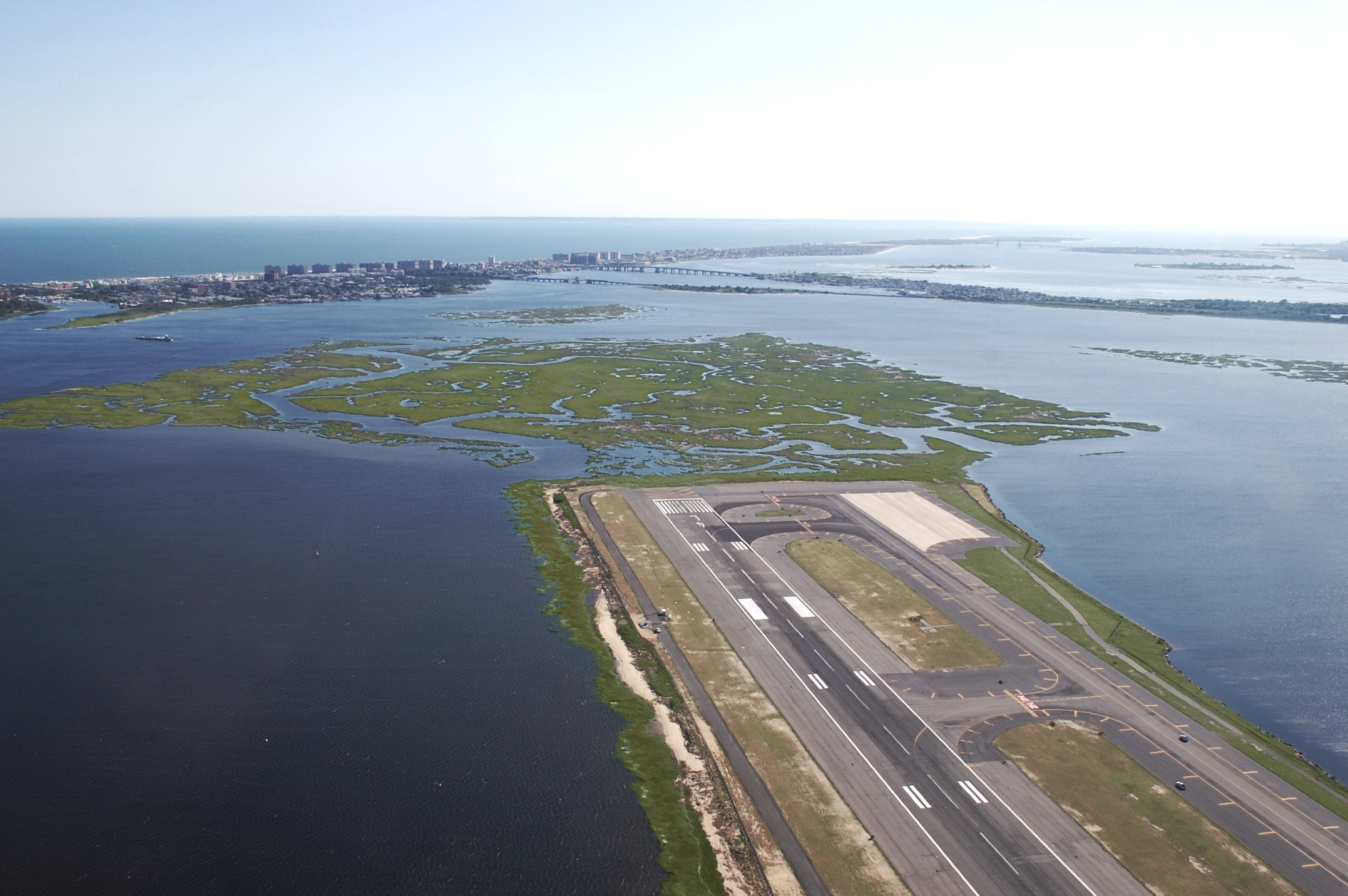
The south end of Runway 4L at JFK Airport extending into Jamaica Bay, with the Rockaways in the distance.

In September 1973, the Edgemere Landfill was described as "the highest land area on the entire Rockaway Peninsula. It is a hugh mound of sand-covered garbage and waste material which has obliterated the marshy shoreline where marine life thrived for many years." On August 29, 1974 the bodies of three boys from the Edgemere Houses were found on the beach surrounding the Edgemere Landfill. Their deaths were suspected to have been caused by drowning or a lightning strike. In late 1975, the city began experimenting with methods to discourage birds from feeding off the Edgemere Landfill, in order to prevent them from interfering with planes at John F. Kennedy International Airport. The experiments included poisoning the supply of food waste at the site, shredding food waste accepted by the landfill into small pieces, narrowing the area in which garbage was dumped, and installing a horizontal-wire grid over the landfill to discourage birds from landing on it. This was in addition to the existing shotgun patrols at the airport who would discharge firearms or set off fireworks to scare the birds away. The shredding method had already been tested on landfills in the Midwest and in Charleston, South Carolina. The initiatives were motivated by an incident in November 1975, when an ONA DC-10 aircraft crashed upon takeoff after colliding with seagulls, which were sucked into the right-wing engine destroying it.

Following the crash, on March 8, 1976, the National Transportation Safety Board recommended closing the landfill due to potential dangers for aircraft from the airport. On May 18, 1976 the Sanitation Department informed officials from Queens Community Board 14 and the Gateway National Recreation Area that the Edgemere Landfill would remain in operation until 1985. At the time, the DSNY refuted the assertion that the dump contributed to the bird hazard of JFK Airport. Mosquitoes and foul odors were also blamed on the landfill. In 1977 the Parks Department and Department of Sanitation garnered controversy over the closure of the Edgemere Landfill on weekends between Saturday afternoon and Monday morning. As opposed to traveling to the Fountain Avenue Landfill in Brooklyn, Parks Department garbage trucks collecting waste from Rockaway Beach would deposit their loads onto a parking lot at Beach 64th Street and Larkin Avenue in Arverne (now part of the Arverne by the Sea development) and wait until Monday to deposit the trash in Edgemere. In November 1979 following 11 bird strike incidents at JFK Airport in a period of six weeks, the Federal Aviation Administration began collecting evidence in preparation to sue the city in order to close the Edgemere, Pennsylvania Avenue and Fountain Avenue Landfills. FAA Regional Director Murray Smith had previously met with Mayor Ed Koch on October 5 of that year to discuss the correlation of the bird hazard with the presence of the landfills.

During the 1970s, the landfill was said to have received hazardous waste on a daily basis. Meanwhile, waste oil was added to the garbage at Edgemere and other landfills in order to control dust. Between March and October 1979, 5,000 to 6,000 gallons of oil and petroleum byproducts were deposited in the Edgemere, Pennsylvania and Fountain Avenue Landfills, with most of the waste going to Fountain Avenue.

In 1981 it was discovered that, beginning c. 1972–1974, DSNY supervisors were paid $100 per truck to allow the dumping of liquid toxic waste at five of the city's landfills including the Edgemere Landfill, and into the sewer system. The other sites were the Pennsylvania Avenue and Fountain Avenue Landfills in Brooklyn; the Tallapoosa Point Landfill at Pelham Bay Park in the Bronx; and the Brookfield Avenue Landfill across from Fresh Kills in Staten Island. The waste was dumped into trenches dug into the landfills. The waste had originated from plants owned by Ford Motor Company, Exxon, Chrysler, Ingersoll Rand, Alcan Aluminum, and others, including the Ford stamping plant in Buffalo, New York. In March 1982 Kenneth Mansfield, a plant manager and truck driver for an oil refining and disposal company operating in the metropolitan area, pled guilty to federal charges of conspiracy concerning the dumping. Mansfield and company owner Russell W. Mahler later pleaded guilty in New Jersey District Court for dumping oil and chemical wastes into the Hudson River. Mahler also pled guilty to disposing of waste oil in the abandoned Butler Mine Tunnel in Butler Township, Pennsylvania, which in 1979 overflowed into the Susquehanna River. He was sentenced to one year in prison for the crime. The mine would later become a Superfund site. Mahler's firm had also received contracts to clean up some of the sites that it had previously contaminated with oil, including one in College Point. In 1982, New York City spent $2.5 million to clean up the company's Long Island City plant, located near the Greenpoint Avenue Bridge just north of Newtown Creek. In 1985, the city filed suit under the Comprehensive Environmental Response, Compensation, and Liability Act (a.k.a. the Federal Superfund Act) against the 14 companies who originally generated the toxic waste later dumped in the city landfills.

In February 1983, nearly 3,000 55-gallon metal drums of waste were discovered inside the Edgemere Landfill. The drums were discovered in the "neck" area of the peninsula just south of the main landfill, when a tractor spreading dirt struck the drums by accident. While most of the drums were empty, many contained lead-based paint and resin. The drums were said to have been buried beginning in 1968, around 15 years prior, when there were fewer regulations concerning the disposal of chemicals. Following the discovery, the New York City Department of Environmental Protection began testing the air, soil, and ground water of the local area for runoff from the drums. That month, the landfill was designated a Superfund site.

On May 18, 1983, the Toxics Project of the New York Public Interest Research Group released a report documenting the dumping of chemical toxic waste at city landfills from 1964 to 1979. The year-long study covered the Edgemere Landfill in Queens, the Pennsylvania and Fountain Landfills in Brooklyn, the Tallapoosa/Pelham Bay Landfill in the Bronx, and the Fresh Kills and Brookfield Avenue Landfills in Staten Island, based on unreleased DSNY internal records. It concluded that "hundreds of tons" of chemical wastes had been deposited at the landfills with the permission of the Sanitation Department, which had been legal until 1979, along with the illegal dumping of "millions of pounds" of toxic wastes such as waste oil. It also confirmed the use of oil at the landfills to control dust, which occurred weekly for six months in each year. This oil was contaminated waste product. The study further concluded that the landfills were not designed to contain chemical wastes, and violated state and federal regulations.

In 1984, the Edgemere Landfill was listed by the New York State Department of Environmental Conservation (NYSDEC) among 895 hazardous-waste sites in the state and among 144 that required top priority to be cleaned up. That year, the city began negotiations with the state to close the Edgemere and Fountain Avenue Landfills.

In 1985, it was anticipated that the Edgemere Landfill would close the next year. By December, however, the Department of Sanitation began negotiating with the NYSDEC to obtain a permit in order to keep the landfill open. In February 1986, the Department of Sanitation announced that the Edgemere Landfill would operate for an additional 21 years until 2007, pending the approval of the NYSDEC. The DSNY argued that the landfill only took in 550 tons of garbage daily, compared to the 22,000 tons accepted by Fresh Kills. They stated that only waste from the Rockaways would be dumped at the landfill. The move to keep the landfill open was opposed by Queens Borough President Claire Shulman.

=== Closing and capping of the landfill ===
In July 1987, the city reached an agreement with the New York State Department of Environmental Conservation to close the landfill by 1991, unless a permit could be awarded to the landfill. Under the agreement, landfill operations could continue until July 1991 while the state conducted an investigation of the site. Dumping in the area where the waste drums were discovered, however, was banned. By this time, the landfill's daily intake of garbage was increased to around 1,000 tons of garbage. By comparison, Fresh Kills Landfill received 23,500 tons daily. With the eventual closure of Edgemere and Fresh Kills imminent, the city planned to replace the landfills with several "resource recovery facilities" in the future. This included waste-to-energy incinerators, one of which would be located at the Brooklyn Navy Yard, which would generate electricity from burning garbage. In addition, gas recovery plants to extract methane would be created at several inactive landfills including Fresh Kills and Pelham Bay. In December 1987, local community groups and politicians filed suit to have the landfill shut down, citing the fact that the landfill was operating without a permit. At the time, it was referred to as the "most toxic landfill in the world" due to the historical dumping of oil and chemicals. It was also stated that 167,000 gallons of toxic liquid seeped from the landfill on a daily basis. It was compared to the Love Canal landfill, another Superfund site located in Niagara Falls. In 1989, Edgemere handled over 1,500 tons of city garbage on a daily basis, making up 7.6 percent of the city's waste. In comparison, 4.4 percent of the city's waste was burned in city-owned incinerators, 8.1 percent was disposed of in apartment incinerators, and 73.4 percent (14,000 tons per day) was taken to Fresh Kills Landfill in Staten Island.

In March 1990, the city and state began removing 7,000 drums of toxic waste from the Edgemere Landfill. That year, the Department of Sanitation's Bureau of Waste Prevention, Reuse and Recycling (BWPRR) began a pilot composting program at the Edgemere Landfill, handling 1,000 tons of leaves. Another composting facility would be opened that year at Fresh Kills.

The Edgemere Landfill was closed on schedule in July 1991. This left Fresh Kills Landfill as the city's only landfill, joined by six municipal incinerators and the city's growing recycling program. By this time, the president of the Bayswater Civic Association had nicknamed the landfill "Mount Edgemere". This was similar to the "Mount Corona" nickname given to a 90-foot (27 m) mound of ash in the former Corona Ash Dumps, now the site of Flushing Meadows–Corona Park. Following its closure, the New York City Department of Environmental Protection assumed responsibility for the cleanup of the site and other former landfills. 75 percent of cleanup costs would be covered by the New York State Superfund program. The closure of the Edgemere Landfill, and the previous decommissioning of the Pennsylvania Avenue and Fountain Avenue Landfills, helped to reduce the bird strike hazard at JFK Airport.

In summer 1992 the New York City Department of City Planning released the New York City Comprehensive Waterfront Plan, which sought to improve and expand the waterfront parkland within the city including the area around Jamaica Bay. The plan urged the DSNY and Department of Environmental Protection to develop a containment plan for the Edgemere Landfill, which should include "innovative bio-technology approaches". It also sought to create additional parkland in Edgemere, and preserve the wetlands along the Sommerville and Conch Basins. In July 1992, a $30.4 million settlement with over 100 corporations and public entities was reached in the 1985 Superfund lawsuit over dumping at Edgemere Landfill and four other city landfills. It was the fourth settlement reached under that suit.

Capping of the Edgemere Landfill began in September 1995, which would permanently seal the site. The landfill was covered with a 6-inch base of topsoil, an impermeable geomembrane used to contain gasses emitted from the landfill, a layer of clay, and a second layer of topsoil. The uppermost layer of soil contained Spartina grass. The landfill was graded with a 4 percent slope to allow optimal storm runoff. 700,000 cubic yards (540,000 m^{3}) of topsoil for the capping project were brought to the site by barges, as officials from Queens Community Board 14 requested the use of the barges instead of trucks. A pier was constructed in the Sommerville Basin to accept the topsoil; this was later converted into the fishing piers. Rock-covered channels were created circumscribing the landfill to prevent erosion. A gas extraction and flaring system was constructed in order to collect the gas emitted from the landfill, which would then be used as fuel or sold. The flaring system was used to control odor, the first such system for a landfill in the city. It had been estimated in 1991 that the methane produced by the landfill could provide heat for over 100,000 homes. In the neck area of the site where the drums were discovered, a groundwater "pump and treat" well system was installed to decontaminate the area. The capping project was completed in 1997 at the cost of $40 million. Afterwards, a 15-year monitoring period began to regulate the gasses emitted by the landfill.

=== 2000s ===
By March 2000, the NYSDEC declassified the landfill as a Class 2 Site ("significant threat to the public health or environment") and reclassified it as a Class 4 site ("site properly closed-requires continued management"). It was expected at this time that the site would need 10 to 15 years of monitoring and management to fully close the site. The landfill was declared "cleaned of all toxins" by the DEC in 2003. At the time it was one of two Superfund Sites in the Rockaways, along with a former Long Island Lighting Company coal gasification plant at Beach 108th Street in Rockaway Park.

In May 2007, the Parks Department designated Rockaway Community Park, Bayswater Park, and Beach Channel West park in Belle Harbor as parks with off-leash areas for dogs. In 2009, Queens Community Board 14 district manager Jonathan Gaska proposed using the Edgemere Landfill as a solar panel field. The proposal was suggested to the Long Island Power Authority (LIPA), which provides electricity to the Rockaways. It was supported by New York State Assemblywoman Audrey Pheffer.

On October 19, 2013, twenty thousand trees and five thousand shrubs were planted at Rockaway Community Park by volunteers as part of the Park's Department's MillionTreesNYC program, the largest planting event in the program's history. The trees would act as a buffer for a future storm, and were planted in response to Hurricane Sandy in 2012. The project was supported by the NY/NJ Super Bowl Host Committee for Super Bowl XLVIII, which was to be played in February 2014, along with the National Football League themselves and Verizon. The project replaced invasive species with trees native to coastal environments. In 2016, interns with the Rockaway Waterfront Alliance discovered a population of diamondback terrapin turtles in the former landfill.

=== Rockaway Parks Conceptual Plan ===
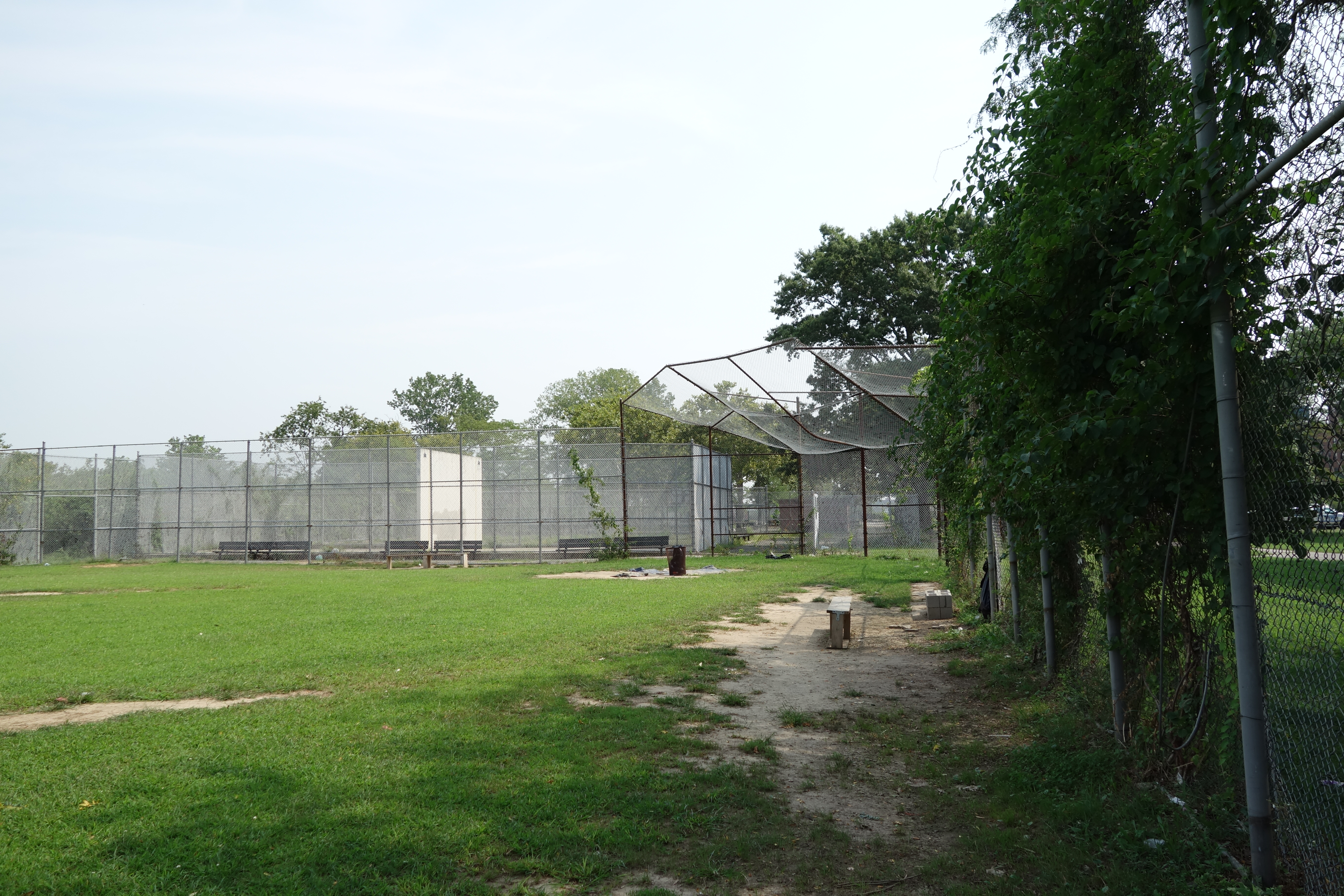
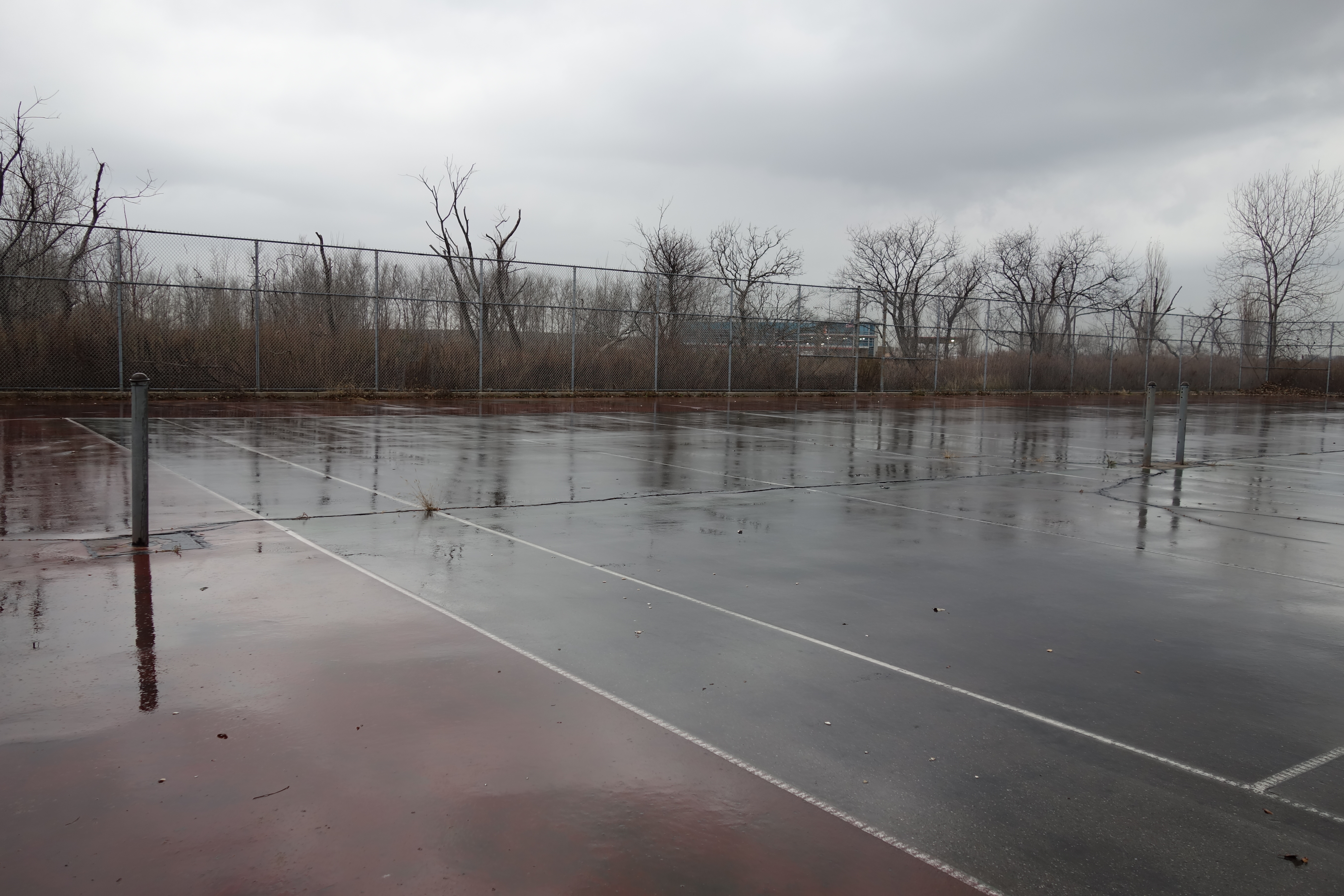
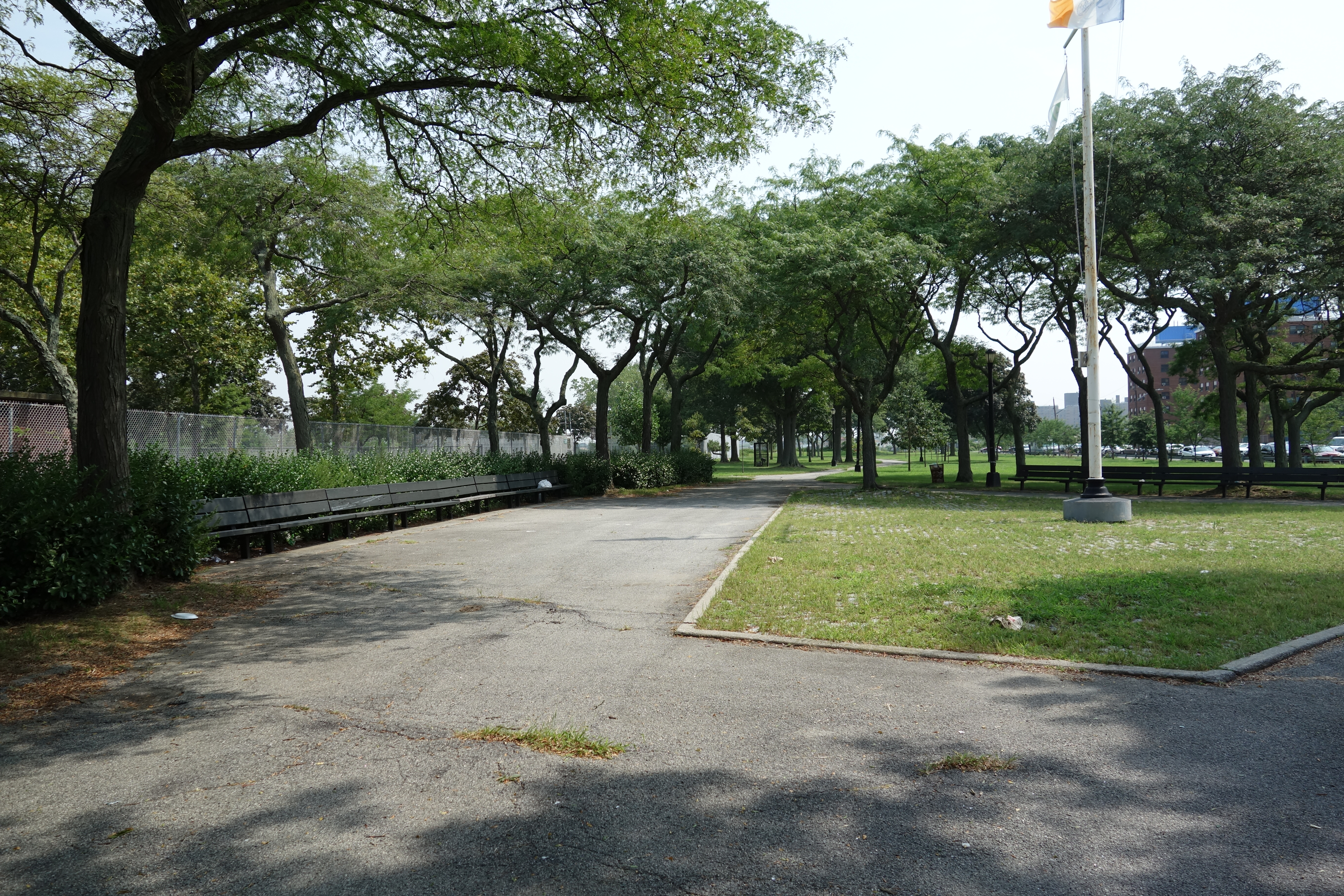
Empty recreational facilities within Rockaway Community Park. The park is underutilized due to the presence of mosquitoes.

In May 2014, the New York City Department of Parks and Recreation released the Rockaway Parks Conceptual Plan, which proposed several upgrades to parks on and around the peninsula following Hurricane Sandy in 2012. The plan included a major renovation of Rockaway Community Park. The existing recreational facilities along Almeda Avenue would be upgraded, with a "Gaming Area" featuring ping pong and shuffleboard to be added. The Gaming Area would replace the existing handball courts in the center of the park, while new handball courts would be erected on the adjacent small playground. Additional handball courts would be erected on a portion of the current tennis courts at the far east end of the park. The open grass areas at the far south end of the park would be converted into picnic and barbecuing areas. The three natural areas on the outskirts of the park would be developed, with a continuous pathway to be established circumscribing the park. The portion of the pathway on the Sommerville Basin in the west natural area would be paved, and extend south to Beach Channel Drive to improve access to the park. North of Almeda Avenue, a wetland boardwalk would be created on the Sommerville Basin. An additional fishing pier would be built on the Sommerville Basin near Almeda Avenue, while a kayak launch point would be installed on the Conch Basin at the east end of the park. The wetlands and upland forest in this area would be restored. The triangular east natural area would be developed into a skatepark, with an additional picnic area to be established. In addition, the Conch Playground would be developed as part of Rockaway Community Park. An artificial turf field would be constructed, while the existing playground would be renovated. Numerous additional mosquito magnets would be installed around the park.

As part of the Conceptual Plan, a Bayside Nature Trail would be established through the Rockaway Peninsula, running east along the Jamaica Bay Shore from the Rockaway Freeway Dog Run underneath Hammels Wye at Beach 84th Street, to the Jamaica Bay Park in Far Rockaway at the Queens-Nassau County border. The trail would cross Rockaway Community Park via the new pathways on the west and east ends of the park, and the existing pathway in the northern natural area, with a second pathway to be established parallel to Almeda Avenue.

In December 2014, the Regional Plan Association proposed a Jamaica Bay Water Trail around Jamaica Bay, expanding the existing water trail network within the city. Rockaway Community Park would be part of the Rockaway Bayside Trail, running along the northern Jamaica Bay shore of the Rockaway Peninsula from Breezy Point east to North Woodmere Park and Idlewild Park across from JFK Airport. A primary launch point and kayak rental site for the trail would be located at the base of the park in the Conch Basin, with additional access points at Marina 59 in the Sommerville Basin to the west, and at Bayswater Park in the Norton Basin to the east. Both Marina 59 and Bayswater Park are preexisting access points.

On April 25, 2016 during a meeting of Queens Community Board 14, Anbaric Development Partners proposed to create a microgrid and cable electrical system, with an underwater high-voltage direct current cable running from New Jersey to Long Island. The microgrid system would involve installing solar panels on the Edgemere Landfill, at the parking lot of Jacob Riis Park in western Rockaway, and at Green Acres Mall in South Valley Stream, Nassau County. The solar panels would then feed into the cable system.

On October 29, 2017, Mayor Bill de Blasio announced $145 million in resiliency projects in the Rockaways following Hurricane Sandy, building upon the Rockaway Parks Conceptual Plan and the Resilient Edgemere Community Plan. The plan proposes to raise the shoreline or berm around the Edgemere Landfill and restore the native wetland plants around the landfill to act as a barrier against storm surge. The funding for the various projects would come from surplus FEMA funds from previous resiliency projects.
