= Penhawitz =

17th century Long Island sachem

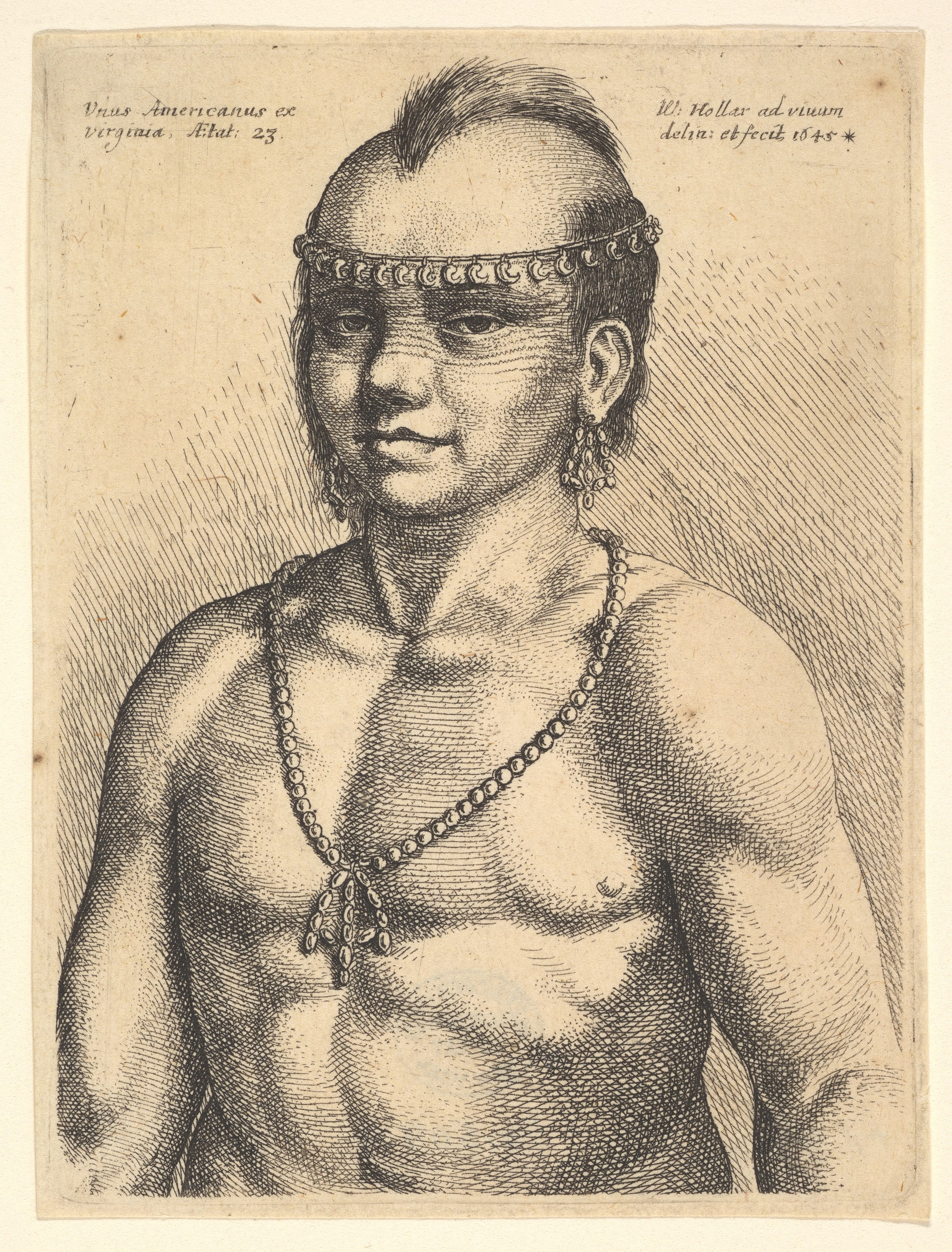
1645 portrait of a captive in Antwerp by Wenceslaus Hollar. There is no portrait of Penhawitz, and so the Museum of the City of New York uses this image in its permanent exhibition "New York At Its Core".

Penhawitz was a 17th century Munsee leader who was well known among the Dutch in New Amsterdam.

He was Sachem of the Canarsee band of Munsee in the 1630s and 1640s, and cultivated a relationship with the government of New Netherland. He was the first Long Island sachem known to the Dutch, and was based in modern Brooklyn.

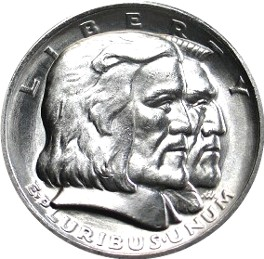
Long Island Tercentenary half dollar commemorating the Flatlands purchase.

Penhawitz, along with fellow Canarsee Kakapetteyno, facilitated the "purchase" of Flatlands, Brooklyn by Andries Hudde and Wolfert Gerritse in 1636. His group's longhouse at modern Canarsie, Brooklyn was labeled Keskachaue on the 1639 Manatus Map (the westernmost field sold to the Dutch was Keskateuw); with increasing Dutch encroachment, it does not appear on later maps. In 1640, Penhawitz alerted his colonial allies to an English expedition to Long Island that had torn down the copper Dutch Republic Lion off of a tree, and they foiled the occupation

In March 1643, after the initial massacres of Munsee men, women, and children that began Kieft's War, Penhawitz invited David Pietersz. de Vries to come to Rechqua Akie near Rockaway for a negotiation with Munsee leaders. Described at this time as one-eyed, Penhawitz joined De Vries on his return to Fort Amsterdam to sign a peace treaty, which did not hold. His son Tackapausha succeeded him during his lifetime, and Penhawitz's later life is not recorded.

== In popular culture ==
A fictionalized version of Penhawitz appears in the 2008 children's fantasy novel Gods of Manhattan and its sequels.

== See also ==
- Oratam
- Wampage
