= Rockaway Beach and Boardwalk =

Public park in Queens, New York

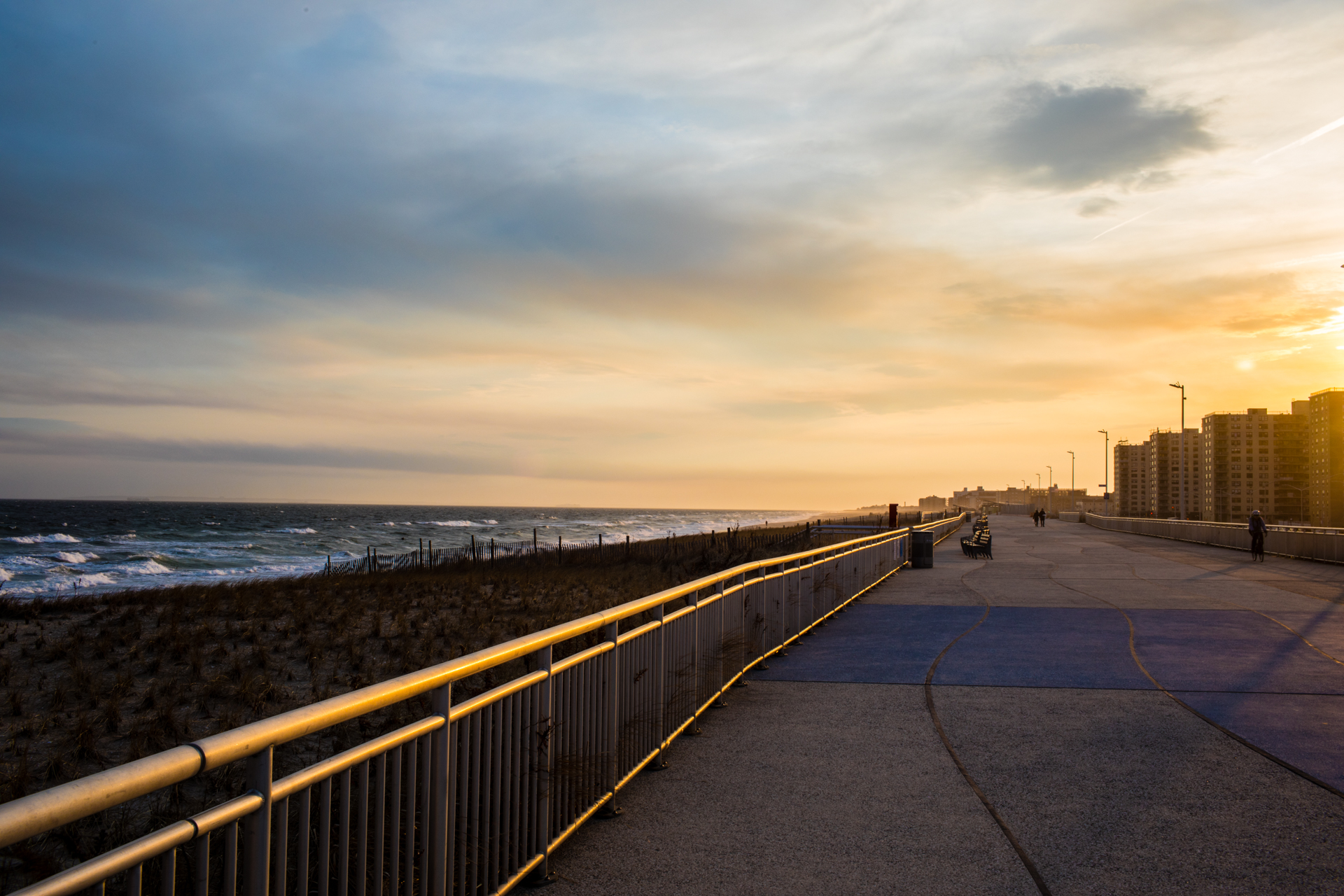
- Seen at sunset in 2019
- Interactive map of Rockaway Beach and Boardwalk
- Location: Rockaway, Queens, New York
- Coordinates: 40°35′08″N 73°48′21″W
- Area: 170 acres (69 ha) (beach and boardwalk)
- Operator: New York City Department of Parks and Recreation

The Rockaway Beach and Boardwalk is a public park in Rockaway, Queens, New York, composed of the 170-acre (69 ha) Rockaway Beach and the adjacent 5.5-mile (8.9 km) Rockaway Boardwalk. The beach runs from Beach 9th Street in Far Rockaway to Beach 149th Street in Neponsit, a distance of 7 miles (11 km). The boardwalk, a concrete deck, runs from Beach 9th Street to Beach 126th Street in Rockaway Park, at the edge of Belle Harbor. There are also numerous recreational facilities within the park, parallel to the beach and boardwalk.

The beach became a popular resort area in the late 19th century, and several disconnected sections of the boardwalk were constructed by the end of the century. The first section of city-owned boardwalk between Beach 109th and 126th Street was completed in 1923, and the city announced plans for a massive boardwalk two years later, stretching across most of the Rockaway peninsula's southern shore. The city government completed the sections between Beach 19th and 109th Streets in three phases between 1928 and 1930. The concrete boardwalk from Beach 9th Street to Beach 19th Street was completed in 1963. After Hurricane Sandy destroyed much of the boardwalk in 2012, it was rebuilt in several phases through 2017.

The park has been maintained by the New York City Department of Parks and Recreation since 1938. It is nominally policed by the New York City Parks Enforcement Patrol.

== Description ==
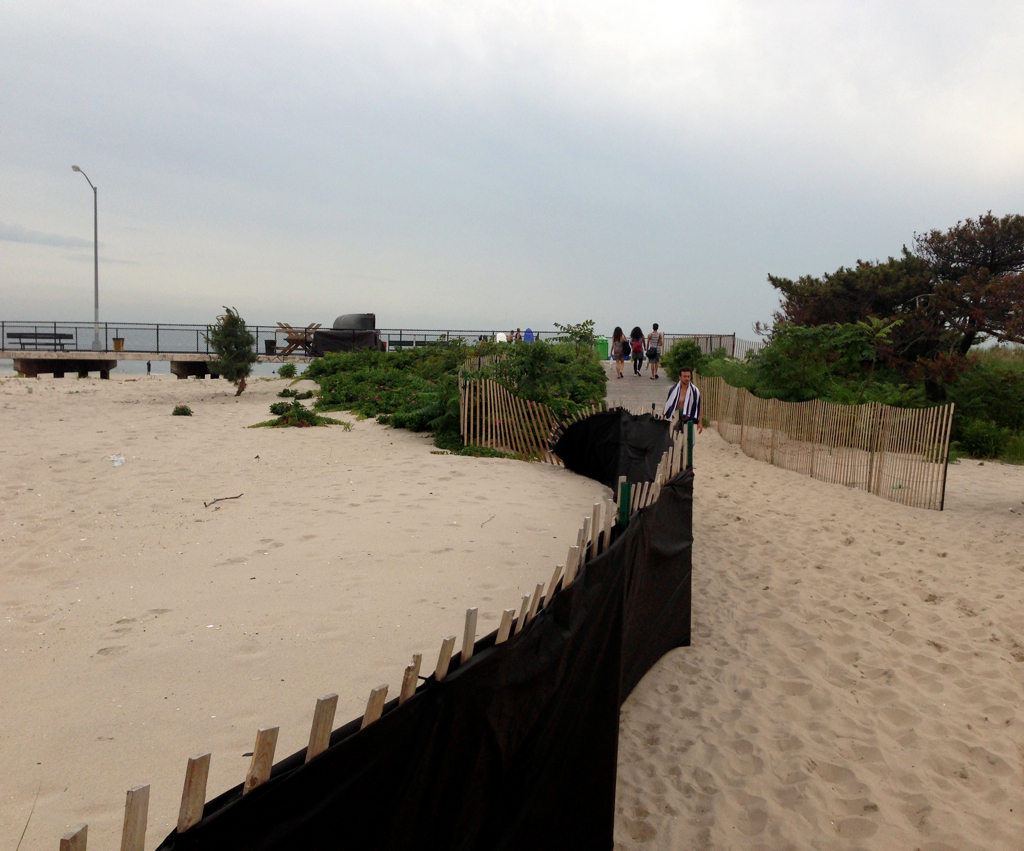
View of the beach north of the boardwalk

The Rockaway Beach and Boardwalk, operated by the New York City Department of Parks and Recreation (NYC Parks), run parallel on the Rockaway peninsula from Beach 9th Street in the east, within Far Rockaway, to Beach 126th Street in the west, within Rockaway Park. The beach and boardwalk are parallel to Beach Front Road from Beach 59th to Beach 73rd Street, and are parallel to Shore Front Parkway from Beach 73rd to Beach 108th Street. The beach continues west to Beach 149th Street in Neponsit, where it connects with the beach at Jacob Riis Park. The boardwalk is 5.5 miles (8.9 km) long while the beaches cover an area of 170 acres (69 ha) over 7 miles (11 km).

The beach and boardwalk run adjacent to a variety of neighborhoods, including public housing on the Beach 50- and 60-numbered streets in Edgemere and Arverne, and high-rise developments on the Beach 100-numbered streets in Rockaway Beach. Some sections of the boardwalk, such as the sections in Edgemere and Arverne, are next to mostly uncrowded beaches. Other sections, such as the segment in Rockaway Beach, include recreational facilities and bathroom facilities and tend to be crowded.

The Q22 bus runs close by for almost the entire route of the beach. The western part of the beach is also served by the Q35 bus, while the central part is also served by the Q52 SBS and Q53 SBS buses. The Rockaway Beach and Boardwalk is also largely within walking distance to several stations on the New York City Subway's IND Rockaway Line. The central section of the park is served by the A and S trains between the Beach 90th Street and Rockaway Park–Beach 116th Street stations, while the eastern section is served by the A train between the Beach 25th Street and Beach 67th Street stations.

=== Boardwalk ===
The planks were originally made of several different woods such as "Angelique, teak, pine, ipe, Cumaru and greenheart", according to The New York Times. However, most of the wooden boardwalk was destroyed during Hurricane Sandy in 2012. The wooden boardwalk was ultimately entirely replaced with concrete.

When originally planned, the boardwalk was to extend almost 9 miles (14 km) from Beach 9th to Beach 169th Streets, connecting with the boardwalk in Jacob Riis Park. The boardwalk was intended to be 80 feet (24 m) wide and an average of 14 feet (4.3 m) above the beach. More than 12,000 yellow-pine deep foundations were to be used for the boardwalk, and more than 1,100,000 feet (340,000 m) of yellow pine planks were to be used for the bulkheads. As built, the boardwalk was supported by about 1,306 concrete "bents", supported by three or four wooden piles and spaced at intervals of about 19 feet (5.8 m).

The present boardwalk, made largely of concrete, is supported on piles spaced 30 feet (9.1 m) apart and driven up to 27 feet (8.2 m) underground. A pair of piles support a concrete foundation or "bent". The concrete slabs of the boardwalk surface are secured to their foundations. A sand-retaining wall under the boardwalk is designed to prevent sand from drifting away from the beach. Most of the boardwalk is 40 feet (12 m) wide, and largely follows the path of the original boardwalk, with minor modifications to straighten out its route. "Bump-outs", which add between 5 and 15 feet (1.5 and 4.6 m) of width to the boardwalk, are installed at areas where there are stairs and ramps, as well as at areas with amenities such as benches. The present modular benches reused wood from the old boardwalk.

=== Beach ===
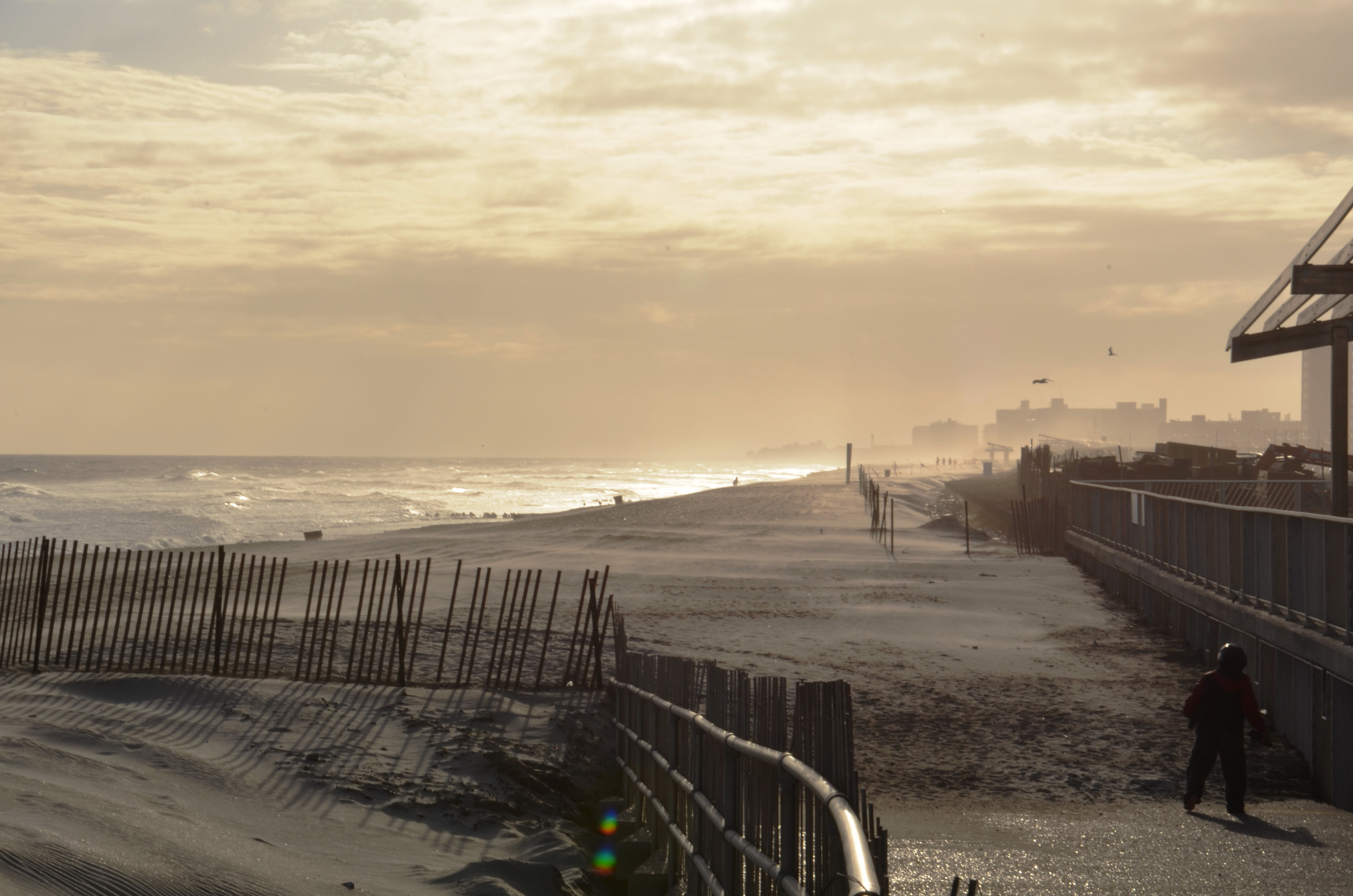
Beachfront in the Rockaway Beach neighborhood

The beach was built with an average width of 300 to 400 feet (91 to 122 m), using 2,500,000 cubic yards (1,900,000 m^{3}) of sand. Parts of the beach in Arverne and Edgemere were filled to a width of up to 1,000 feet (300 m) due to strong currents in that area. To protect beach erosion, jetties were constructed at 400 feet (120 m), extending from the boardwalk to the ocean. From 1977 to 2004, the United States Army Corps of Engineers (USACE) undertook a beach nourishment project between Beach 19th and 149th Streets, replenishing a 100-to-200-foot (30 to 61 m) wide strip of the beach. Ecologically, the beach contains maritime beach and maritime dunes communities, with vegetation present along the length of the beach. The section from Beach 38th to Beach 57th Street is a piping plover habitat and, since 1996, has been closed to the public from April to August of each year.

Rockaway Beach is the only one of New York City's beaches that sees significant surf, and all 7.5 miles (12.1 km) of the beach are patrolled. In 2005, The New York Times reported that of 1,000 lifeguards hired for the city's beaches, 500 of them worked on Rockaway Beach. The beaches are generally most utilized from Memorial Day in May to Labor Day in September. The city's only legal surfing beaches are also along Rockaway Beach, between Beach 67th and 69th Streets and between Beach 87th and 92nd Streets.

On the section between Beach 126th and 149th Streets, which does not have frontage on the boardwalk, the beach is accessed by stairs or ADA-accessible ramps at the ends of these streets. Along that section, baffle walls are installed to prevent sand migration. The segment between Beach 9th and 20th Streets has five areas where paths extend south of the boardwalk and cross the beach's dunes to the shoreline.

=== Park facilities ===
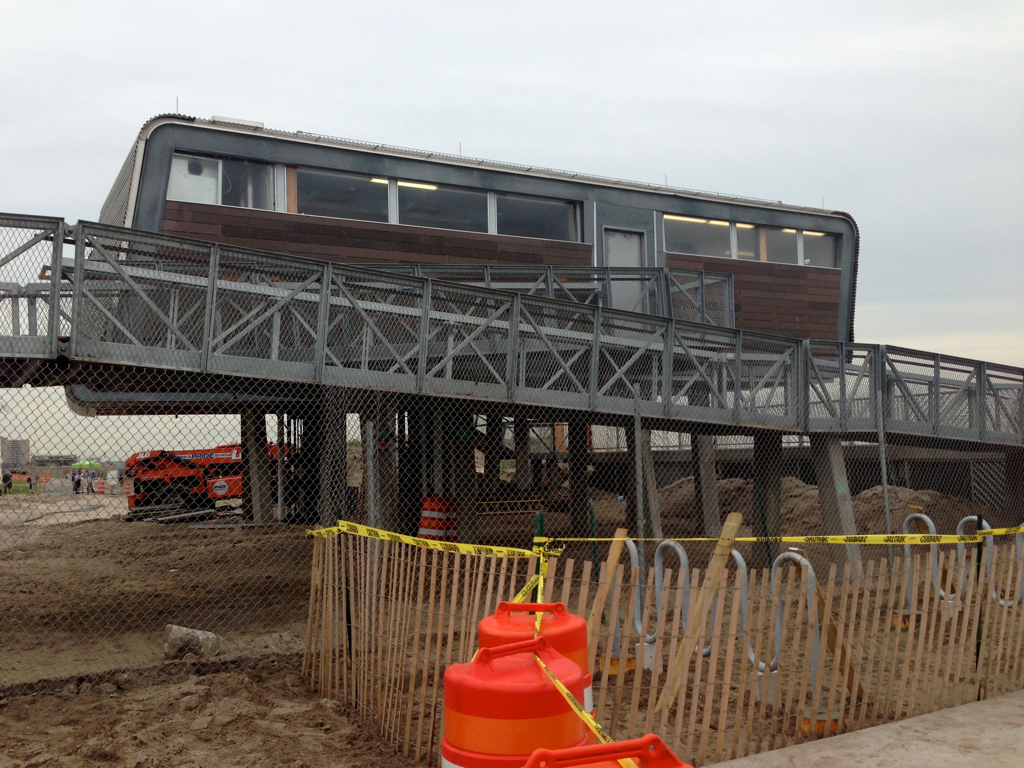
July 2013

There are several recreational facilities along the beach and boardwalk, including basketball and handball courts, a roller hockey rink, skateparks, and playgrounds. In addition, there are food concessions at Beach 17th, 86th, 97th, and 106th Streets. "Comfort stations", or restrooms, also exist at Beach 9th, 17th, 32nd, 60th, 86th, 97th, 106th, and 115th Streets. The original comfort stations were destroyed in 2012 during Hurricane Sandy; these were replaced in 2013 by modular structures designed by Garrison Architects, which are installed in pairs. The modular structures contain double-layered stainless-steel facades and are powered by photovoltaic cells.

The section of the park within Far Rockaway contains three sets of recreational facilities. O'Donohue Park, near Beach 9th Street at the eastern end of the Rockaway Beach and Boardwalk, contains a playground, ten handball courts, three basketball courts, and restrooms, as well as the Far Rockaway Skate Park. Near Beach 17th Street is another playground, as well as a baseball field. The next recreational facilities are between Beach 27th and 32nd Streets, which contain the Beach 30th Street Playground and a football field. In Arverne, there is a playground and handball facilities at Beach 59th Street. Another playground, as well as one basketball and eight handball courts, are on the boardwalk's south side from Beach 74th to 77th Street. Within Hammels, there are eight handball and two basketball courts west of Beach 81st Street, and two playgrounds at Beach 84th Street. In the neighborhood of Rockaway Beach is the Rockaway Beach Skate Park at Beach 91st Street. There is an ice hockey rink at Beach 109th Street. In addition, there is an amphitheater at Beach 94th Street.

A gray-and-aquamarine stucco sculpture called "Whaleamena", formerly of the Central Park Children's Zoo, is situated at the Beach 95th Street entrance to the park. A seal sculpture from Central Park is also on the boardwalk. On Shore Front Drive, there are a series of decorative bus shelters designed for the 1939 New York World's Fair. The shelters contain aquatic-themed murals designed by Esther A. Grillo and installed in 1997.

At Beach 116th Street, there is also a memorial to the victims of American Airlines Flight 587, which crashed into the Rockaway peninsula in 2001 and killed 265 people. The memorial, designed by Dominican artist Freddy Rodríguez and Situ Studio, was completed in 2006. It consists of a wall, inscribed with the victims' names, with windows and a doorway looking toward the nearby Atlantic Ocean and angled toward the Dominican Republic, the origin country of many crash victims. Atop the memorial is a quotation, in both Spanish and English, from Dominican poet Pedro Mir, reading "Después no quiero más que paz", which translates to "Afterwards I want nothing more than peace."

== History ==
The Rockaway peninsula became a popular area for seaside hotels starting in the 1830s, with the first resort being founded at Far Rockaway in 1835. Many resorts were situated on Rockaway Beach along the southern side of the peninsula. The peninsula's popularity grew in the 1880s with the construction of the Long Island Rail Road's Rockaway Beach Branch to Long Island City and Flatbush Terminal (now Atlantic Terminal), which facilitated population growth.

=== Predecessors ===
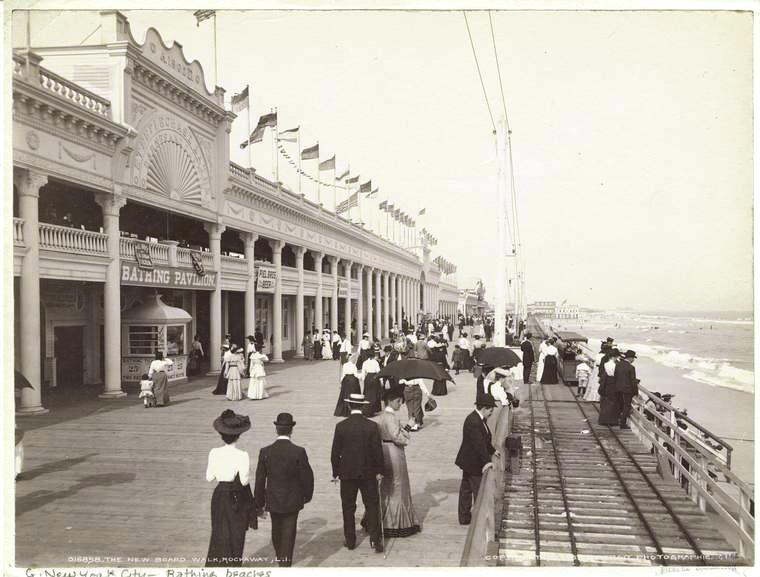
Rockaway Boardwalk, 1903

Several disconnected sections of boardwalk were built along the beach in the late 19th and early 20th centuries, mostly clustered around resorts. These included a 1-mile (1.6 km) stretch in Arverne to the east, a 0.8-mile (1.3 km) stretch in Rockaway Park to the west, and shorter sections in Hammels and Hollands (now Rockaway Park) in the center. The peninsula became part of the City of Greater New York in the late 1890s. Amusement parks also opened along the beach, such as Rockaways' Playland in the first decade of the 20th century.

The initial boardwalk in Arverne was built in 1886, 3 feet (0.91 m) above the beach. A new boardwalk, stretching about 0.75 miles (1.21 km), was built 300 feet (91 m) to the south in 1900–1901. Family houses, a hotel, and an 800-seat theater were built around the Arverne boardwalk, though the boardwalk was often damaged by hurricanes and high tides. Each property owner on the boardwalk was to be charged $1 for each bedroom in their property, although several owners and tenants initially refused to pay the tax.

A separate boardwalk was built in the communities of Hollands and Seaside in 1893. That boardwalk had been built after the resorts in these communities were wrecked in an 1892 fire. The boardwalk contained several theaters, hotels, and roller coasters. Yet another boardwalk, located at Rockaway Park, was also overlooked by resorts.

=== Expanded beach and boardwalk ===
==== Planning and first section ====
By the 1910s, the Arverne Boardwalk Committee and the Arverne Hotel Owners' Association were advocating for the construction of a boardwalk from Beach 58th or 59th Street to Beach 109th Street. The Edgemere Taxpayers' Association supported building a boardwalk both westward to Beach 109th Street and eastward to Beach 24th Street. Residents of Rockaway Park wanted a boardwalk as well, connecting Jacob Riis Park at Beach 148th Street to Edgemere. Several groups collaborated to acquire land on the waterfront, and by 1923, the civic groups had acquired almost all waterfront land in Arverne between Beach 59th and 75th Streets. The city planned an "experimental boardwalk" between these streets, following the model of the Riegelmann Boardwalk at Coney Island. Queens borough engineers considered three options: a boardwalk without a road, one with a wide parkway, and one with a narrow parkway. The city government also sent engineers around the world to look at other boardwalks' designs, as it intended to build the world's longest boardwalk along the Rockaway shore.

The city government had started constructing a concrete boardwalk on city-owned land in Rockaway Park, between Beach 109th and 126th Streets, by 1922. The boardwalk in Rockaway Park, which opened in May 1923, was 31 feet (9.4 m) wide and 4,500 feet (1,400 m) long, and cost $133,000. It was placed under the jurisdiction of NYC Parks. The residents of Neponsit and Belle Harbor, between Beach 126th and 149th Streets, also sought a boardwalk. However, the city did not own the shoreline in these two neighborhoods, precluding the city from adding a boardwalk in these neighborhoods unless the residents were willing to pay taxes for a boardwalk extension to their communities. By early 1923, the city had passed resolutions to acquire title to the shore between Beach 59th and 75th Streets in Arverne, and between Beach 126th and 149th Streets in Neponsit and Belle Harbor. It was also in the process of acquiring title between Beach 25th and 59th Streets in Edgemere and Far Rockaway, and between Beach 75th and 109th Streets in Hammels, Hollands, and Seaside.

The New York City Board of Estimate appropriated $8 million for a beach improvement project on the Rockaway peninsula in June 1925. The Queens borough president's office started soliciting bids to build "bulkheads, groynes, jetties and breakwaters" and to add sand to the southern shore of the Rockaway peninsula between Beach 59th and 109th Streets. The Gahagen Realty Company submitted a low bid and received a $1.26 million contract for the work. The boardwalk was slated to be completed within three years, in anticipation of an increase in Rockaway-bound traffic created by the completion of Cross Bay Boulevard. The expanded beach would be city property once the project was completed. Actual work on the boardwalk would occur after the shore-improvement projects were finished. However, work was delayed for a year because of a lack of money. By June 1926, the city had approved $1 million for the project and was speeding up plans to construct the section of boardwalk between Beach 59th and 109th Streets.

==== Connections between sections ====
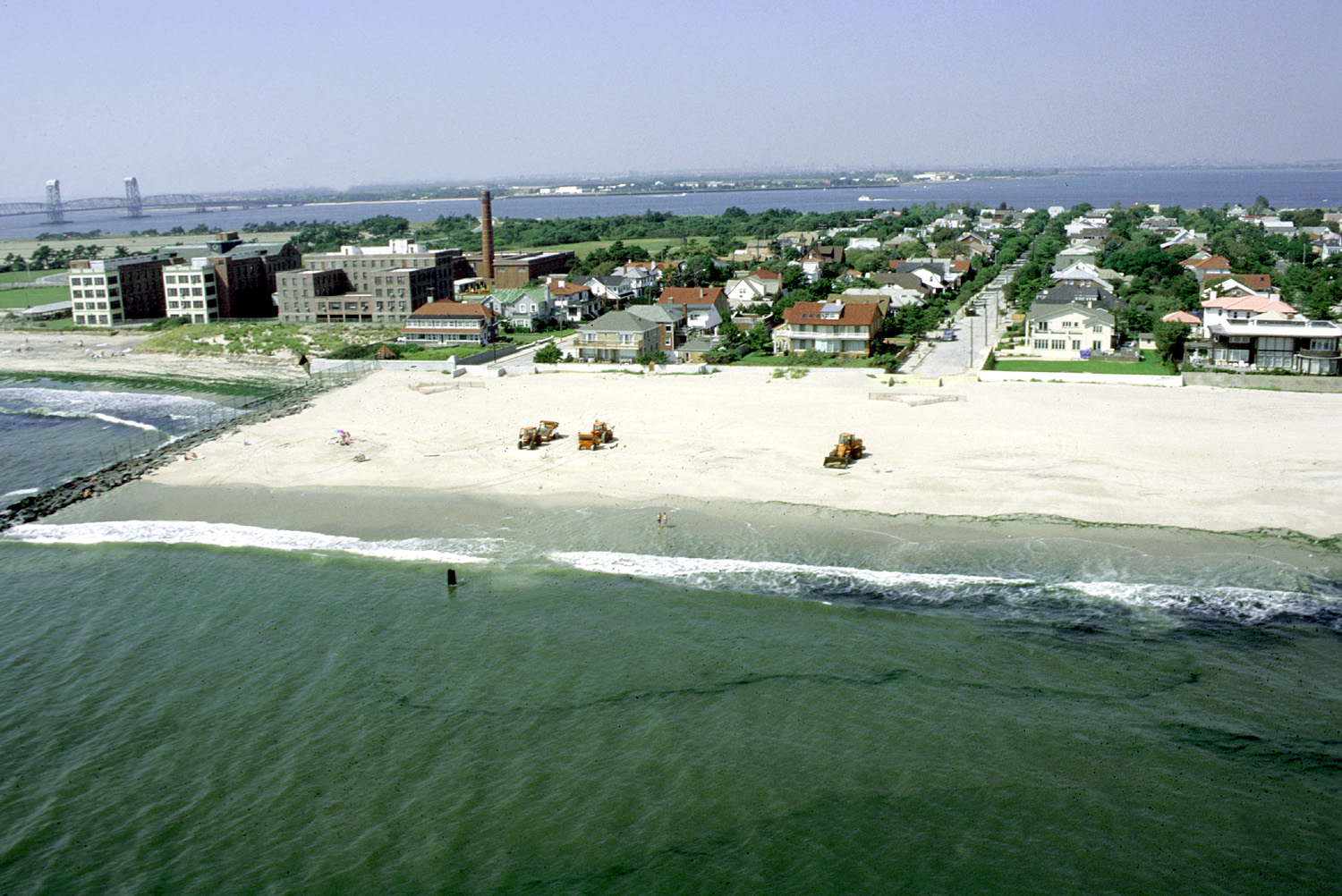
The western end of Rockaway Beach, (pictured near Neponsit Beach Hospital) does not have a boardwalk.

The Board of Estimate appropriated $500,000 for the first connecting section of the boardwalk between Beach 91st and 109th Streets in mid-1927. That August, contractor Muccini & Decker reported that between 30 and 40 buildings in the boardwalk's path would have to be condemned and demolished. The contractor subsequently stated that work would progress even as the buildings were to be razed. The existing boardwalk at Hollands and Seaside, between Beach 90th and 100th Street, would be removed and replaced. Work began in September 1927, although the first pile was driven that November. By then, some $4 million had already been spent for shore protection and beach widening. The first section was dedicated in June 1928, although the portion east of Beach 102nd Street was opened to the public first, while the section west of that street opened in July 1928, except for a small gap at Beach 109th Street. With the opening of this boardwalk section, real estate demand along the shore increased in 1928, while existing resort owners started planning amusement attractions. More than $1.5 million was invested in constructing hotels, apartment buildings, and bathing pavilions.

Funding for the third section of the boardwalk, between Beach 56th and 21st Streets, was requested in September 1928, just as work on the second section between Beach 75th and 56th Streets was to commence. The second section was to cost $467,000. Queens borough president George U. Harvey formally opened the boardwalk's second section in June 1929. Work on the third section began in late 1929, although the ceremonial first pile was not driven until January 1930. The third section was built by D. M. W. Construction at a cost of $610,000. The contractor reported in April 1930 that it was ahead of schedule, and would likely have the third section open by the end of the following month. Delays in securing the wooden decking for the boardwalk pushed the opening back by several months. There were also delays caused by the need to remove rock in the boardwalk's path. The third section was finally opened in September 1930, four months after the contractors had initially projected. At the time, the Queens borough president's office operated the portion of the boardwalk east of Beach 105th Street, while NYC Parks operated the section to the west. A temporary ramp connected to Beach 19th Street.

While construction was ongoing, there were disputes over the compensation that the city was scheduled to pay property owners. In September 1930, New York City Comptroller Charles W. Berry objected to the $12.5 million proposed compensation, saying that the land was assessed as being worth only one tenth as much. The city suspended compensation payments for the property that November. Ultimately, the compensation payments were lowered to $9.2 million, as decided by the New York Supreme Court in June 1931.

The fourth section of the boardwalk, east of Beach 21st Street, was delayed because tidal conditions would prevent the city from building a boardwalk east of Beach 14th Street without having to acquire significant space inland. City authorities considered ending the boardwalk at Beach 14th Street instead, but property owners in Far Rockaway refused, stating that they were entitled to benefit from the boardwalk since they had paid taxes for it. Harvey also wished to delay the construction of the fourth section because of the then-ongoing litigation over the property compensation. Finally, the section of beach between Beach 16th and 20th Streets was the privately owned Roche's Beach; the owners opposed the construction of the boardwalk and successfully lobbied to stop it. The westernmost section was not built either, because the president of the real estate board covering Rockaway Park, Neponsit, and Belle Harbor did not wish to start construction until the Far Rockaway section was built.

=== 1930s to 1960s ===
The extended boardwalk experienced several major fires after its completion, including during 1931 and 1937. In 1938, the responsibility of maintaining the boardwalk, and the beach between Beach 9th and 149th Streets, was transferred to the New York City Department of Parks and Recreation (NYC Parks). This jurisdiction extended to the beach at Jacob Riis Park, which was operated by NYC Parks until 1974.

Parks commissioner Robert Moses had previously criticized the condition of the Coney Island, Rockaway, and South Beach boardwalks, saying, "These beaches and boardwalks were never properly planned, and cannot under present conditions be properly maintained and operated." To improve the condition of the Rockaway Beach and Boardwalk, Moses cleared a 200-foot-wide (61 m) strip of land north of the boardwalk for Shore Front Parkway, which opened in 1939. Moses demolished more than 700 buildings in the parkway's path and destroyed what he described as "catch-penny enterprises" along the boardwalk, replacing them with recreational fields. The beach was also extended toward the sea. By 1941, jukeboxes were banned from the boardwalk, as was bicycling during the summer.

Four municipal parking lots at Beach 32nd, 52nd, 64th, and 69th Streets were opened within the park in 1948. During that time, the boardwalk between Beach 73rd and 85th Streets, and east of Beach 33rd Street, was reconstructed for $200,000. Moses announced the construction of another three parking lots in the park in 1950, at Beach 55th–59th, 62nd–63rd, and 67th–68th Streets, as well as landscaping along the boardwalk. These seven parking lots were intended to serve as children's play areas outside of the summer season, and Moses rejected attempts to install parking meters in these parking lots. During the mid-20th century, Rockaway Beach was seen as one of the best surfing places in the New York metropolitan area. In the 1950s, the beach employed a lifeguard force of 258, among the world's largest.

The beach suffered from considerable erosion, despite the presence of 115 jetties along the beach. The erosion had caused 115 acres (47 ha) of beach to wash away between 1947 and 1955. The New York State Department of Public Works commenced a multi-year project in 1955 to combat this erosion, including adding forty groins and transferring 1,250,000 cubic yards (960,000 m^{3}) of fill onto the beach to create a barrier. By 1959, Moses had extended the beach eastward 0.5 miles (0.80 km) to Beach 9th Street, and commenced work for O'Donohue Park alongside the new stretch of beach, which opened in 1961. Part of the boardwalk in Arverne was burned down in 1960 and was subsequently rebuilt. As part of the construction of O'Donohue Park, a section of concrete boardwalk from Beach 9th to 19th Street was built in the early 1960s. This section was constructed with a budget of $1.373 million.

=== 1970s to 2000s ===
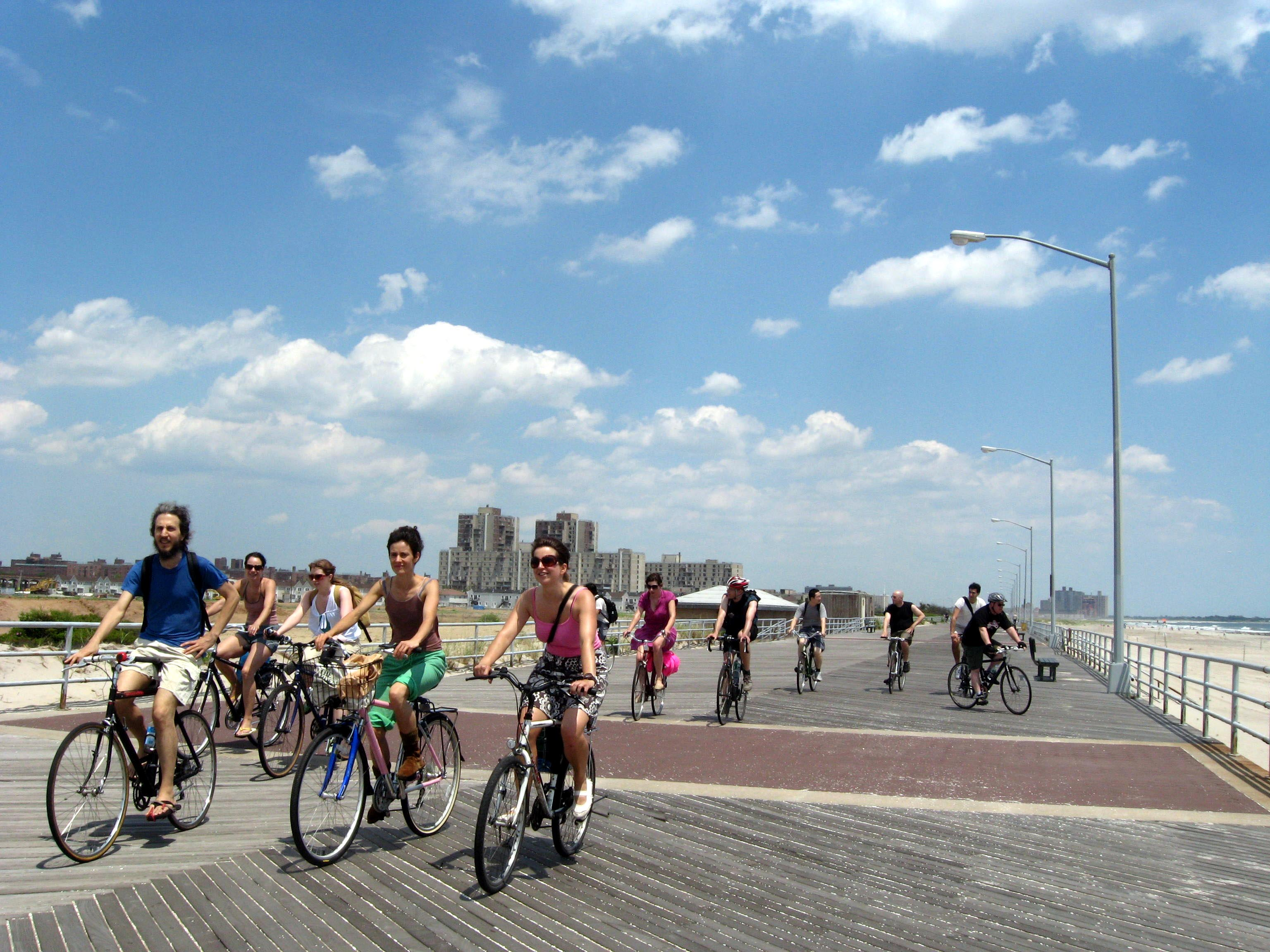
The wooden boardwalk, seen in 2008

Repairs costing $115,000 were made to the boardwalk in the late 1960s or early 1970s. However, by 1971, NYC Parks was considering replacing the wooden planks with plastic or concrete due to the high maintenance cost of the wooden planks, which were deteriorating. The central Rockaways were in decline at the time, and fewer concessions were operating on the boardwalk every year. Further, because of erosion of the beach, water would go under the boardwalk at high tide, and some stairs from the boardwalk led to steep drop-offs where the beach formerly was. Thirteen blocks of the beach had eroded away by 1973, forcing the closure of parts of the beach in the Edgemere and Rockaway Beach neighborhoods, and the boardwalk had become dilapidated. To remedy this issue, the United States Army Corps of Engineers (USACE) started preparing a hurricane-protection and water-purification project for the Rockaways. A plank replacement project, commenced in 1975, was stopped later that year due to the city's 1975 fiscal crisis. Work on the plank replacement restarted in 1977 as part of a $19 million investment in parks citywide.

During the late 20th century, the boardwalk also became known for dangerous incidents, including wild dog attacks. A large segment in Edgemere and Arverne abutted vacant lots, which were still extant during the 2010s. The last of the amusements that once occupied the boardwalk, Rockaways' Playland, closed in 1987. However, the New York Daily News reported in 1980 that Rockaway Beach was cleaner than Coney Island's beach, in part because of large cleaning crews and because of the park's proximity to the Edgemere Landfill.

The Far Rockaway section of the boardwalk was renamed in honor of local resident Helen Leonescu in 1983. USACE refilled the beach every two years between 1980 and 1988. The beach further eroded following the December 1992 nor'easter, although the boardwalk remained relatively intact. Because of this erosion, the section of the park between Beach 26th and 36th Streets was closed to the public for at least three years. USACE subsequently refilled the beach between 1995 and 2004. The boardwalk was renovated during the 1990s with the construction of new play structures between Beach 82nd and 86th Streets, repairs to the boardwalk, installation of spray showers and drinking fountains, and restoration of the bus shelters beside the boardwalk. That boardwalk section reopened in 1999 for the first time in 25 years. Workers also rebuilt the section between Beach 109th and 116th Streets in 1999 at a cost of $600,000. The first surfing beaches in the city opened along Rockaway Beach, at Beach 90th Street in 2005 and at Beach 67th Street in 2007. There was little commerce along the park's path by the first decade of the 21st century, and its route was characterized mainly by residential buildings and open space.

=== 2010s to present ===
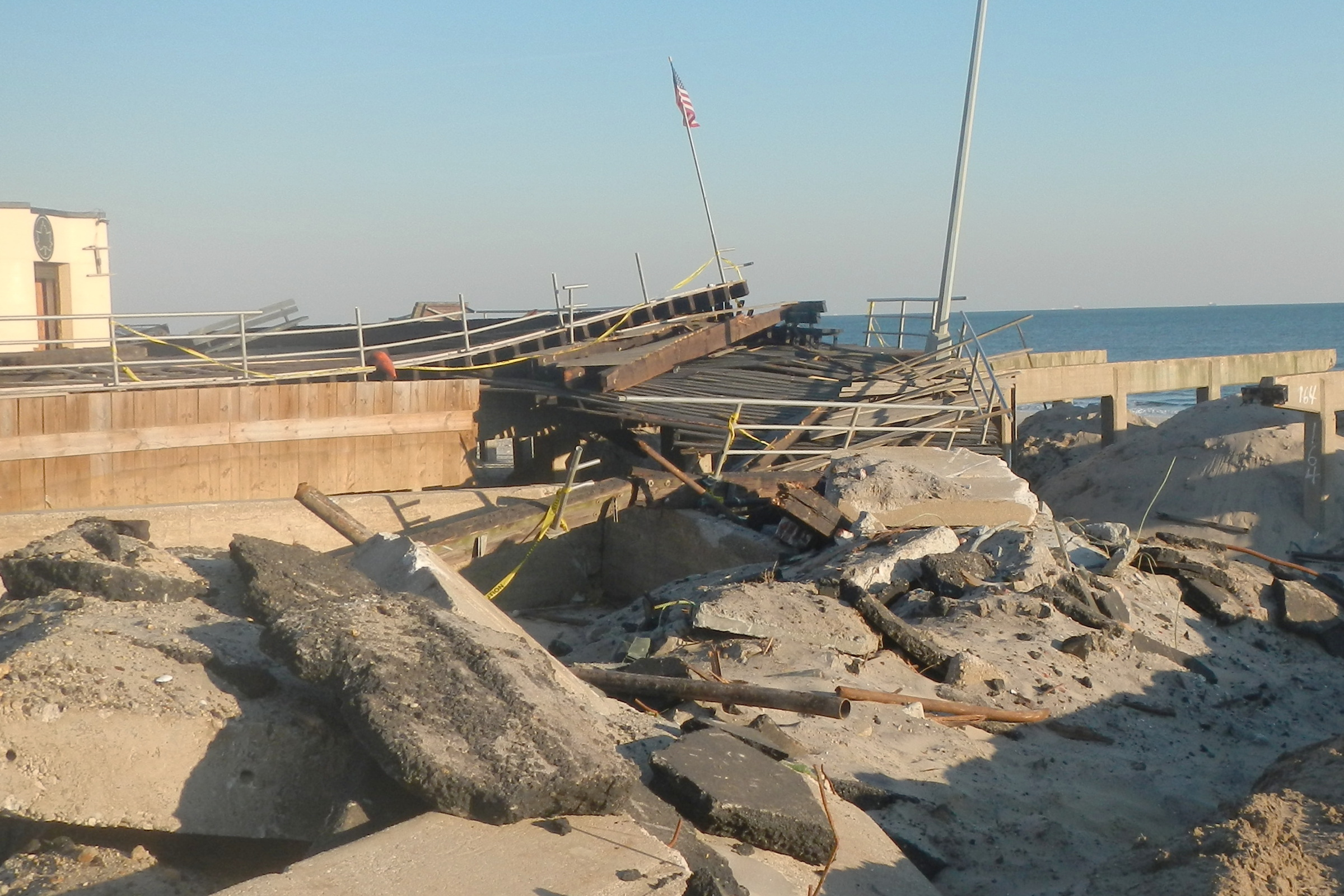
Demolished boardwalk after Hurricane Sandy

A feasibility study of storm protections along the beach was ordered in 2003, but there was not enough money to conduct such a study. The boardwalk was damaged in August 2011 during Hurricane Irene, particularly around Beach 95th Street, where the planks had been "split like an open zipper", according to New York City Council member Eric Ulrich. As a result, NYC Parks conducted a $3.8 million rebuilding project for the summer 2012 season.

==== Hurricane Sandy damage ====
On October 29, 2012, Hurricane Sandy destroyed much of the Rockaway Boardwalk. The most impacted parts of the boardwalk were between Beach 80th and 106th Streets, where some planks were tossed into nearby houses. In the aftermath of the hurricane, several entities disagreed over how the wood should be reused. Michael Bloomberg, the New York City mayor at the time, announced in December 2012 that the boardwalk would be rebuilt in concrete rather than wood. Four of the concrete sections that had been rebuilt before the hurricane had suffered relatively little damage compared to the wooden sections, which were almost completely destroyed. The wooden boardwalk between Beach 9th and 60th Streets, a 2.5-mile (4.0 km) stretch, was also relatively undamaged, except for a four-block gap between Beach 35th and 39th Streets. The beach was also depleted, although many Rockaways residents had stated that, for several years before Hurricane Sandy, the beach had been eroding slowly. Sand from the beach had landed on people's yards and on nearby streets, while personal property had been tossed onto the shore.

Despite the damage caused by Hurricane Sandy, the city promised to open all its public beaches by Memorial Day in May 2013, including Rockaway Beach, where temporary beach access points were set up. The city restored some of the sand and added snow fence to prevent the sand from blowing back out. New modular comfort stations and lifeguard booths were also installed along the length of the park starting in 2013. City officials also announced that they would construct temporary platforms, or "islands", at Beach 86th, 97th, 106th, and 116th Streets, allowing residents to access the beach for the 2013 season.

==== Complete reconstruction ====
By September 2013, the city estimated that a reconstruction of the beach and boardwalk would cost $200 million. The rebuilding, overseen by CH2M Hill, would entail the replacement of the entire boardwalk as well as the addition of 50,000 feet (15,000 m) of railings. The boardwalk project, to cost $274 million, was divided into five phases from west to east, the first of which was to begin in early 2014. The section between Beach 35th and 39th Streets was initially rebuilt in wood to match the undamaged portions on either side; ultimately, the entire boardwalk was to be permanently rebuilt in concrete. Many sections of the boardwalk would be raised to an elevation above 100-year flood levels, requiring the reconstruction of the relatively undamaged sections as well. Skanska was hired as the major contractor for the boardwalk project. Construction was funded by a $480 million grant that the Federal Emergency Management Agency distributed to New York City's government in 2015.

The start of work on the boardwalk's reconstruction was delayed because of several factors. The 2013 United States federal government shutdown delayed the allocation of funding, and plans also had to be revised to accommodate new flood-proofing features. The corroded foundations also had to be replaced, and construction had to take place outside of the mating season of the piping plover, an endangered species that nested on the beach between April and September. In February 2014, a contractor started adding 2,900,000 cubic yards (2,200,000 m^{3}) of sand as an anti-erosion measure, enough to raise the beach by 10 to 14 feet (3.0 to 4.3 m). Simultaneously, a controversy arose around the comfort stations; though some of the modules had not been installed yet, several modules were visibly rusting. The first rebuilt section between Beach 86th and 97th Streets opened in May 2015. The entire length of the boardwalk reopened in July 2016. The rebuilding of the boardwalk was finished in May 2017, with the completion of the final section between Beach 19th and 39th Streets. The next year, the reconstruction received the American Planning Association's National Planning Achievement Award for Urban Design.

Some of the sand from the beach had already eroded by 2017, and the USACE had secured $400 million for further beach improvements, part of a $4 billion project to flood-proof the Rockaways. The city conducted a study in November 2017, finding that despite the erosion, the beach was wider than at almost any other time in the previous century. Despite this, the beach between Beach 91st and 102nd Streets was temporarily closed at the start of the summer season in May 2018, with reopening not expected for several years. A small portion between Beach 96th and 98th Streets was reopened the next month. The Rockaway Beach Skate Park along the boardwalk, which was severely damaged in Hurricane Sandy, reopened in August 2020 after several years of delays surrounding the skate park's reconstruction. In May 2022, city officials announced that portions of Rockaway Beach would be closed that summer so the USACE could reconstruct those sections, which had been affected by erosion. That July, the Shore Front Parkway Adventure Course opened next to the boardwalk between Beach 101st and 102nd Streets.

NYC Parks announced in May 2023 that it was adding or renovating six recreational spaces along the Rockaway peninsula, including four along Rockaway Beach, as part of a $33 million program. At the time, three projects had been finished, including two on the beach: a reconstruction of the Beach 59th Street Playground and a seating area between Beach 92nd and Beach 94th Streets. Two of the three remaining projects also faced the beach: a recreational area with volleyball courts at Shore Front Parkway and Beach 77th Street, and another playground at Beach 98th Street. A new amphitheater between Beach 94th and Beach 95th Streets opened the same month. In 2025, NYC Parks proposed banning cyclists from the boardwalk between Beach 73rd and Beach 108th Streets during the summer; the ban was later reversed. A portion of the beach near Beach 116th Street reopened in June 2025 after being rebuilt. Another section of the beach, in Edgemere, reopened that August after being closed for several decades.

== Impact ==
The park was the inspiration for the Ramones' 1977 song "Rockaway Beach". The song, on their 1977 album Rocket to Russia, became the American punk rock group's highest-charting single, peaking at number 66 on the Billboard Hot 100. Written in the surf rock style of the Beach Boys and other similar bands, the song was composed by the group's bassist, Dee Dee Ramone, who liked to spend time on the beach. In June 2013, the song was used in a radio ad campaign sponsored by the Queens Economic Development Corporation to promote recovery from Hurricane Sandy by drawing New Yorkers back to Rockaway Beach.

Travel + Leisure magazine ranked Rockaway Beach as one of the U.S.'s best beaches in 2024. In its ranking, the magazine said that "This may not be a palm-tree-lined idyll, but for New Yorkers who can hop on a subway or bus to reach its white sand, five-mile boardwalk, and surf-worthy waves, it's heaven."
