= Ocean Bay Apartments (Bayside) =

Public housing development in Queens, New York

Bayside Houses Edgemere Houses
- NYCHA Property
- Ocean Bay Apartments (Bayside) Houses
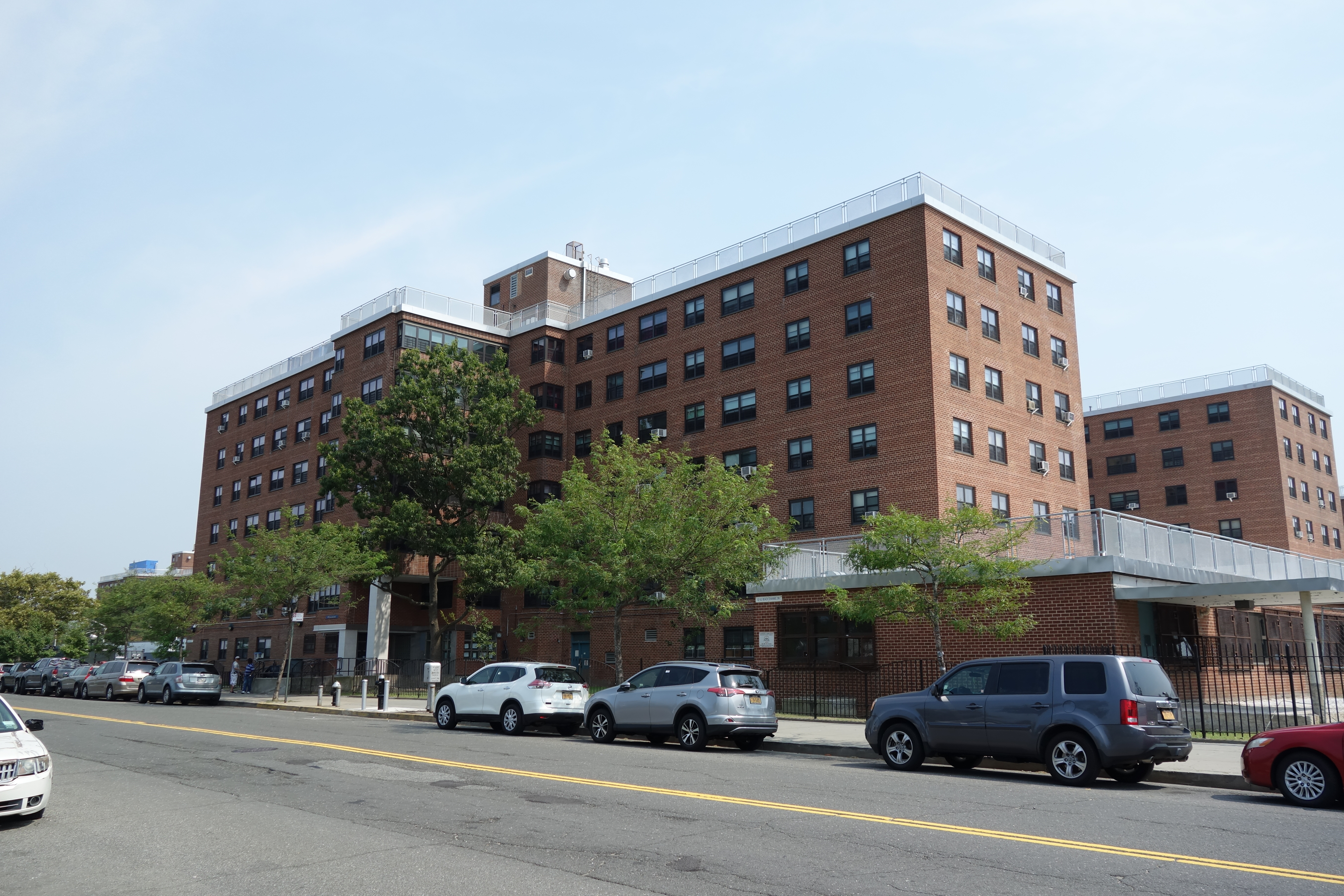
- Interactive map of Bayside Houses
- Country: United States
- State: New York
- City: New York City
- Borough: Queens

Area
  - Total: 32.30 acres (13.07 ha)

Population
  - Total: 3,729
- Zip Codes: 11691 and 11692

The Ocean Bay Apartments Bayside Houses (originally called Edgemere Houses) is a NYCHA housing project with 24 buildings. The First Buildings numbered I-XX (1-20) have 7 stories while the last Buildings numbered XXI-XXIV (21-24) have 9 stories. It is located between Almeda Avenue and Beach Channel Drive and also between Beach 51st to 58th Streets (on the south side of Rockaway Community Park) in Edgemere, Queens.

The project was approved by the Board of Estimate in February 1955. Condemnation proceedings for the land were initiated in February 1958 and groundbreaking for the project took place in October 1958. Tenants began moving into first buildings completed at the complex in November 1960; this housing project was completed in September 1961.

== 21st century ==
In 2002, consistent with the philosophy of the HOPE VI program, the Edgemere Houses and Arverne Houses were renamed as the Ocean Bay Apartments. A celebration was held the following year to mark the completion of the first phase of revitalization of both complexes under the HOPE VI program.

In 2017, NYCHA and 2 others had announced the investment deal for $560 million for renovation, improvements, replacements, and upgrading. It also said to have improved security systems with protected long-term affordability rate.

== See also ==
- New York City Housing Authority
