= Scott Mebus =

American writer

- Born: November 28, 1974 (age 51); Middletown, New York, U.S.
- Occupations: Novelist; composer; playwright; theatrical producer
- Spouse: Kristina Grish (m.2007; div. 2022)
- Writing career
- Genres: Comic novel, Urban Fantasy, Middle-grade
- Subject: Fiction
- Website: www.scottmebus.com

Scott Mebus (born November 28, 1974) is an American novelist, composer and playwright. He has written two adult novels, Booty Nomad and The Big Happy, and the children's urban fantasy series "Gods of Manhattan." His first musical, Tarnish, played in the NY International Fringe Festival in 2001. His latest musical, No Sympathy For The Wolf, debuted at the 2018 NY International Fringe Festival. He also composed the theme song for the Discovery Channel Kids program, Outward Bound.

== Education ==
Mebus attended Hackley School, graduating in 1992. He went on to receive a BA in English from Wesleyan University.

== Work life ==
Mebus was a producer at MTV, working on such shows as The Tom Green Show, The Real World, and MTV Yoga before leaving to pursue his writing career.

== Published works ==
=== Adult books ===
- Booty Nomad (2004)
- The Big Happy (2006)

=== Children's books ===
- Gods of Manhattan (2008)
- Spirits in the Park (2009)
- The Sorcerer's Secret (2010)

=== Short fiction ===
- Bull In The Heather in Noise edited by Peter Wild (2009)

=== Musicals ===
- Tarnish (2001)
- No Sympathy For The Wolf (2018)
