= Tackapausha =

Algonquian chief

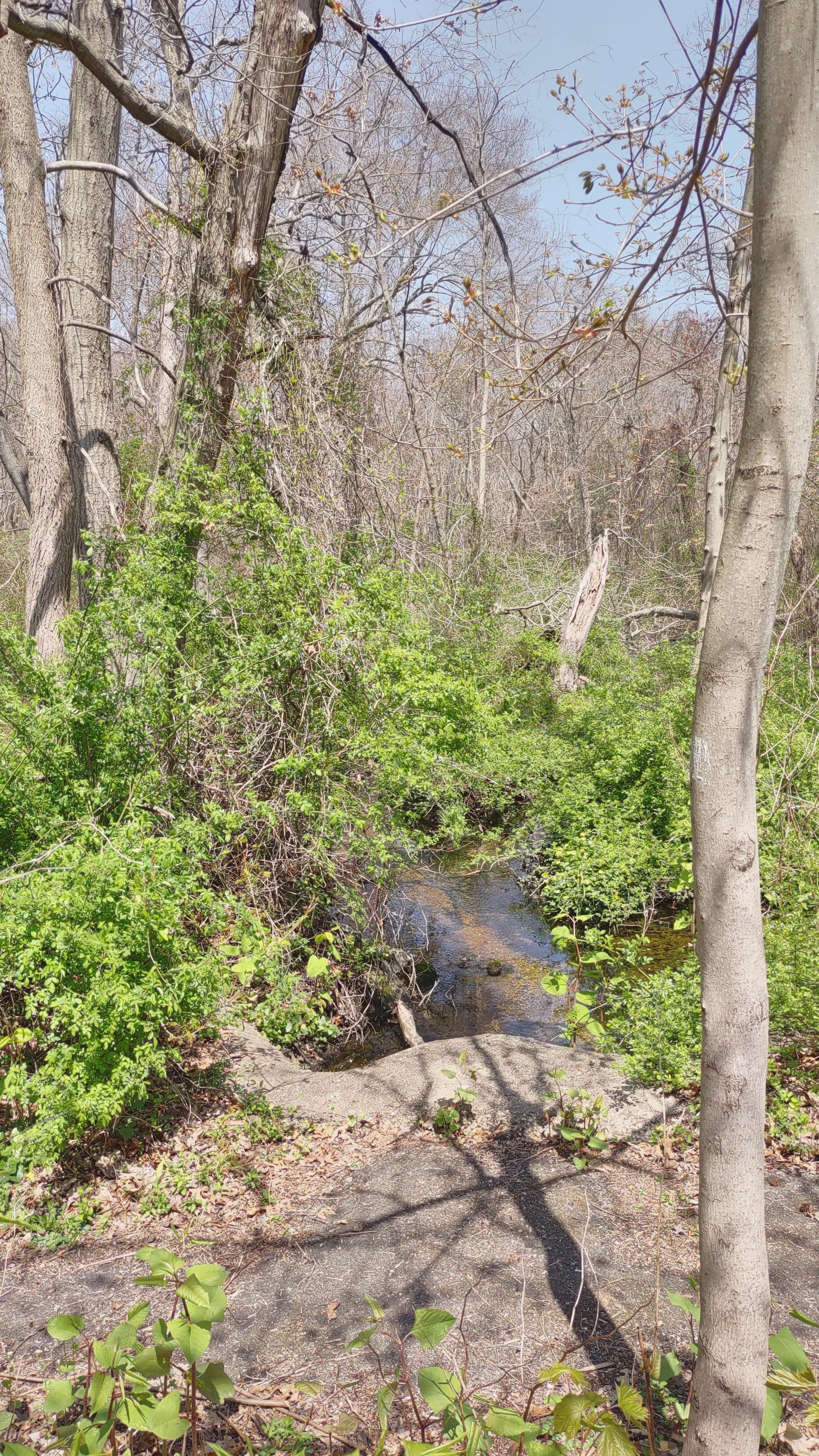
Tackapausha Reserve

Tackapausha – also spelled as Tackapousha – was a Lenape sachem, a successor of Penhawitz (his mother's brother, an important father-like figure in the Algonquian matrilineal kinship system). Tackapousha represented a broad coalition of Munsee-speaking peoples of western Long Island in negotiations with Dutch and English settlers from as early as the 1640s to as late as the 1690s.

Over a period of more than fifty years, Tackapausha was involved in the negotiation of many land-use agreements and alliances between the indigenous people of western Long Island and the Dutch and English colonial authorities. In 1643, he and several other Long Island sachems signed an agreement with Englishmen from the Stamford outpost of the New Haven Colony allowing for the "purchase" of a town plot for the new settlement of Hempstead in territory claimed by the Dutch West India Company. In May 1645, after the murder of five of his people by Hempstead settlers and the murder of two more captured Indians by the Dutch, Tackapausha went to New Amsterdam to meet with Willem Kieft and make peace with the Dutch. At the time, Tackapausha said he was representing all the Indian communities of Long Island and he pledged on behalf of them all to provide warriors to help the Dutch defeat any Indians who opposed them.

Tackapausha was the first person to sell land in the Rockaway Peninsula to a person of European background when he sold the present-day Far Rockaway to an Englishman named John Palmer in 1685.

Tackapausha is the namesake of Tackapausha Museum and Preserve in Seaford, New York. It is an "84-acre sanctuary of oak forests, ponds, streams," established in 1938 by Nassau County.
