= John Palmer (colonial administrator) =

English landowner in what is now the borough of Queens, New York City

Captain John Palmer (c.1650 – c.1700) was an English soldier, lawyer and colonial administrator.

In the earlier 1670s Palmer moved from Barbados to the Province of New York, and he was then appointed ranger of Staten Island. Thomas Rudyard made him one of his councillors in East Jersey, in 1682.

Palmer purchased the land comprising much of the neighborhood now known as Far Rockaway in the borough of Queens in New York City in 1685 from the Native American chief Tackapausha for 31 English pounds. Palmer sold most of the land to Richard Cornell in 1687.

Also in 1687, Thomas Dongan sent Palmer to England, to confer with James II. He was then made a commissioner governing Maine, with John West, taking profit from supposed uncertainties in land titles of colonists there. In 1688 the governor Sir Edmund Andros of New England fell as a result of the Glorious Revolution, and Palmer was imprisoned.

== Legacy ==
The Palmer's Landing neighborhood in the Arverne By The Sea development in Arverne is named after him.
