= Kenneth F. Maxcy =

Kenneth F. Maxcy (July 27, 1889 – December 12, 1966) was an American virologist. He was a professor of epidemiology at Johns Hopkins School of Public Health and Chair of the Department of Epidemiology from 1938 until 1954. He was an authority on rickettsial diseases and typhus.

In 1949-1950 (and possibly beyond), Maxcy was a leading member of the Defense Department's Research and Development Board's Committee on Biological Warfare. (Note that at this time the Department of Defense was then officially called "The National Military Establishment.")

In 1952, Maxcy chaired the committee of the National Resource Council that recommended the fluoridation of drinking water. He later served nine years as director of the Rockefeller Institute's International Health Division. He received the Sedgewick Memorial Medal in 1952, the highest honor of the American Public Health Association.
