= Gods of Manhattan =

2008 novel by Scott Mebus

- First edition
- Author: Scott Mebus
- Cover artist: Brandon Dorman
- Language: English
- Series: Gods of Manhattan
- Subject: Children's fiction, Fantasy
- Publisher: Dutton Penguin
- Publication date: April 17, 2008
- Publication place: United States
- Media type: Print (hardback, paperback), e-book, audiobook
- Pages: 272 pages
- ISBN: 978-0-525-47955-0
- Followed by: Spirits in the Park

Gods of Manhattan is a 2008 children's novel by Scott Mebus. The book was first released on April 17, 2008 through Dutton Penguin and follows a young boy that has discovered a city that runs parallel to Manhattan.

== Synopsis ==
The book follows Rory Hennessy, a thirteen-year-old boy that gains the ability to see Mannahatta, a spirit city existing in parallel with Manhattan. A gift that a magician showed Rory. The city is full of legendary persons such as Babe Ruth and Alexander Hamilton, people who have remembered so much that they have been made into immortal gods in the process. Mannahatta is also home to the Munsees and papier-mache children, whom the gods rule over. When some of the Munsees are held captive in Central Park, Rory must find a way to free them.

== Reception ==
Critical reception for the novel was positive, with Rick Riordan recommending it on his site. Kirkus Reviews gave a positive review for Gods of Manhattan, saying that the book had a "suspenseful climax" and "a satisfying sense of resolution at the end while leaving plenty of issues for future episodes". A staff blogger for Scholastic also gave praise for the novel, as did the SF Site.
