= Ordway (surname) =

Ordway is a surname. Notable people with the surname include:

- Alfred Ordway (1821–1897), American painter
- Bill Ordway (1917–1999), American football player and coach
- Elizabeth Ordway (1828–1897), American advocate for women's suffrage
- Frederick I. Ordway III (1927–2014), American space scientist and author
- Glenn Ordway (born 1951), American radio and television broadcaster
- Jerry Ordway (born 1957), American comic book artist and writer
- John Ordway (c.1775–c.1817), member of the Lewis and Clark expedition
- John M. Ordway (born 1950), American diplomat
- John P. Ordway (1824–1880), American doctor, composer, music entrepreneur, and politician
- Jonathan Ordway (born 1978), American football player
- Katharine Ordway (1899–1979), American philanthropist
- Lester Ordway, American politician and college instructor from Maine
- Lucius Pond Ordway (1862–1948), American businessman, 3M
- Melissa Ordway (born 1983), American actress and model
- Nancy Ordway (1914–2005), American radio actress
- Nehemiah G. Ordway (1828–1907), American politician from Dakota Territory
- Samuel H. Ordway (1860–1934), American lawyer and judge
- Samuel H. Ordway Jr. (1900–1971), American lawyer and civil service reformer
- Scott Ordway (born 1984), American composer and conductor

== See also ==
- Ordway (disambiguation)
