= Ordway =

Ordway may refer to:

== Communities ==
- Ordway, Colorado, a town
- Ordway, South Dakota, an unincorporated community

== People ==
- Ordway (surname), includes a list of notable people with the surname
- Ordway Tead (1891–1973), American organizational theorist
- William Ordway Partridge (1861–1930), American sculptor, teacher and author

== Structures ==
- Jones Ordway House, a historic home located at Glens Falls, New York
- Ordway Building, a skyscraper in Oakland, California
- Ordway Hall (Boston), a former theatre in Boston, Massachusetts

== Other ==
- Ordway Center for the Performing Arts, located in downtown Saint Paul, Minnesota
- Ordway Prize, an annual contemporary art award
