= Lawrence Gresser =

American politician from New York

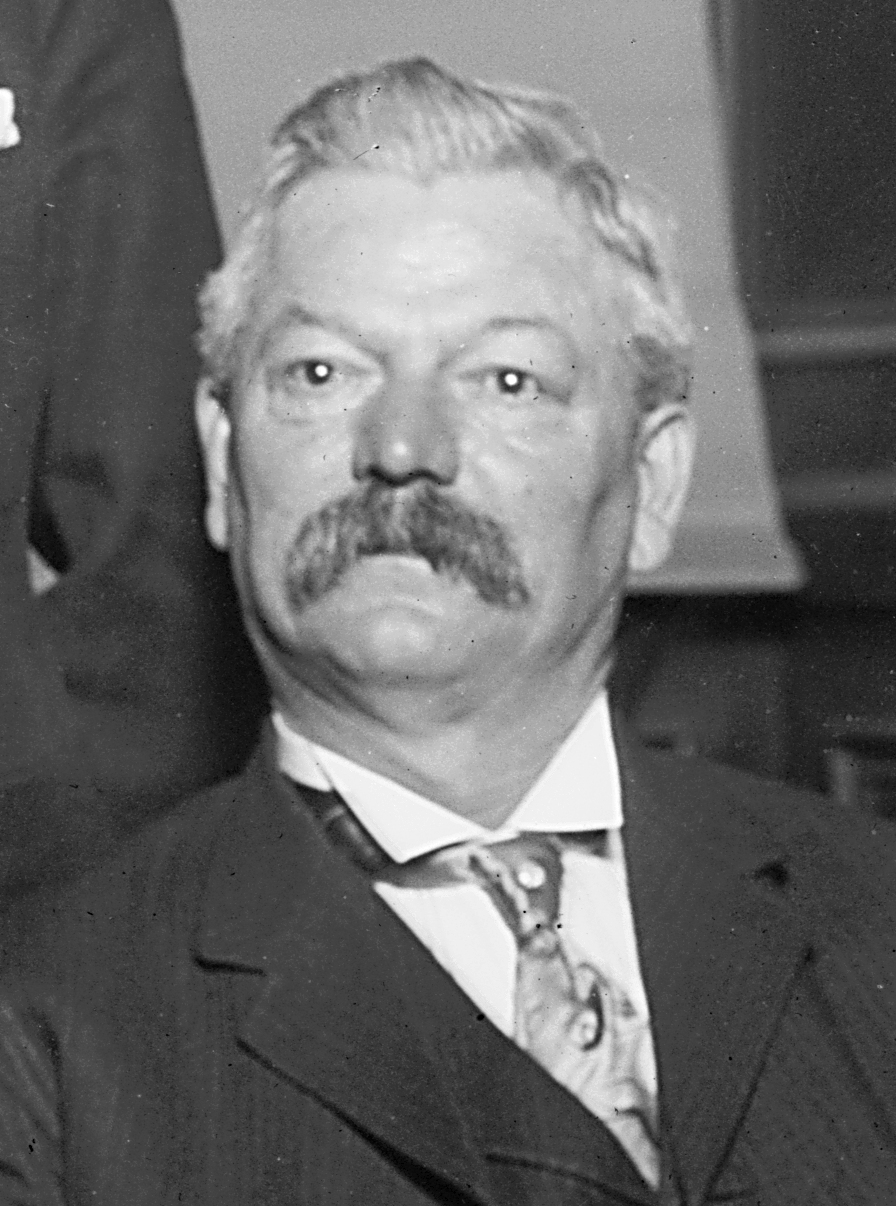

Borough President of Queens
- In office 1908–1911
- Preceded by: Joseph Bermel
- Succeeded by: Maurice E. Connolly

Personal details
- Born: January 1, 1851 Kingdom of Bavaria
- Died: January 30, 1935 (aged 84)

Lawrence Gresser (January 1, 1851 – January 30, 1935) was the Borough President of Queens, New York, USA from 1908 to 1911.

Gresser was born in the Kingdom of Bavaria. He was a shoemaker and emigrated to the United States. Gresser entered public service in Queens in 1898 and served as Commissioner of Public Works under Borough President Joseph Bermel. When Bermel suddenly resigned his office amid a political scandal in 1908, Gresser and Joseph Cassidy were contenders to take over the rest of his term. Cassidy was favored, having already held the office, but Gresser was named instead.

Gresser was elected to his own term in 1909, but barely six months into this term he was accused of abusing his office and being incompetent. These charges were brought to Governor Charles Evans Hughes, who appointed lawyer Samuel H. Ordway to investigate. After a lengthy investigation, Ordway recommended Gresser's removal for incompetence and inefficiency, and Governor John A. Dix removed Gresser from office on September 27, 1911.

Political offices
Preceded by Joseph Bermel	Borough President of Queens; 1908–1911	Succeeded by Maurice E. Connolly
