= Playground Seventy Five =

Public park in Queens, New York

- Interactive map of Playground Seventy Five
- Type: Public park
- Location: Hillcrest, New York
- Coordinates: 40.726292°N 73.808272°W
- Area: 0.75 acres (0.30 ha)
- Operator: New York City Department of Parks and Recreation

Playground Seventy Five is a public park located on 160th Street and 75th Avenue in the Hillcrest neighborhood of Queens, New York. It was acquired by the New York City government in 1929 as part of land condemnations for the construction of Public School 154. The undeveloped section of the block was reserved as a schoolyard and developed as a playground in 1954.

The playground was named after 75th Avenue, a historical thoroughfare known as Quarrelsome Lane that dates to the 19th century when the surrounding landscape consisted of farmland. In 1911, Queens Borough President Maurice E. Connolly directed the borough's Topographical Bureau to design a numbered grid system to connect road segments across Queens and eliminate duplicate names. Quarrelsome Lane became 75th Avenue and nearby Black Stump Road, named after the stumps that delineated farm boundaries, became 73rd Avenue.

The section of Fresh Meadows surrounding this playground was historically known as Flushing Suburban was developed in the 1920s and experienced an influx of African Americans in the 1950s. In contrast to many other racially changing neighborhoods, Flushing Suburban maintained its diversity throughout the following decades. Following the 1964 expansion of the Public School 154, the remaining portion of the playground was jointly operated by Parks and the Board of Education.

Through the efforts of Flushing Suburban Civic Association, residents participated in the civil rights movement by protesting instances of discrimination in Queens while also traveling to the South to promote voter registration. Since 1990, the group organized volunteer cleanups of Playground 75, along with sports programs in partnership with P.S. 154 and other neighborhood schools.
