= Feng Zikai =

Chinese artist and writer (1898–1975)

Feng Tse Kai
- 豐子愷
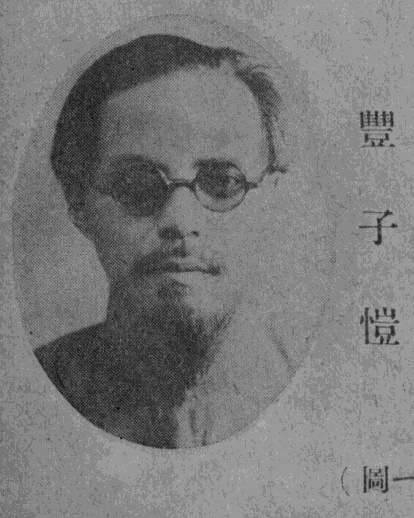
- Born: November 9, 1898; Shimen, Zhejiang, Qing China (now Tongxiang, Zhejiang)
- Died: September 15, 1975 (aged 76); Shanghai, China
- Education: Hangzhou High School
- Occupation: Artist

Feng Tse Kai (T. K., a.k.a. Feng Zikai.; simplified Chinese: 丰子恺; traditional Chinese: 豐子愷; pinyin: Fēng Zǐkǎi; November 9, 1898 – September 15, 1975) was an influential Chinese painter, pioneering manhua (漫畫) artist, essayist, and lay Buddhist of 20th-century China. Born just after the First Sino-Japanese War and dying just before the end of the Cultural Revolution, he lived through much of the political and socioeconomic turmoil during the birth of modern China. Much of his literary and artistic work comments on and records the relationship between the changing political landscape and ordinary people's daily lives. Although most famous for his paintings depicting children and the multi-volume collection of Buddhist-inspired art Protection for Living Beings (護生畫集), Feng was a prolific artist, writer, and intellectual who made strides in the fields of music, art, literature, philosophy, and translation.

== Biography ==
=== Early life and education ===
A native of Shimenwan (石門灣) in Chongde county, Zhejiang Province, Feng Tse Kai went to school from an early age, the only son and youngest of eight children of a relatively wealthy and educated family. The Fengs owned a dye shop, a business made somewhat profitable due to the great number of waterways and trade networks that passed through Shimenwan. Shimenwan lay between Hangzhou and Suzhou, which connected the small, rural town to Beijing and Shanghai. Despite this, Feng Tse Kai's father mostly ignored the dye shop, preferring to study endlessly for the civil service exams in Hangzhou that still mostly dictated one's ability to rise on the economic ladder. Ignoring the family business like his father, but also lacking interest in a traditional Confucian education, Feng became fascinated with art as a child. His father finally passed the provincial exams in 1902, but shortly after that, Feng's grandmother died, initiating the traditional three-year mourning period for Feng's father. By 1905, the civil service exams system was abolished. With no path left for him to take the final exams in Beijing, Feng's father spent his time drinking, smoking opium, and tutoring his only son. This focus on Feng, a byproduct of being the family's sole male heir, made him stubborn and strong-willed. The townspeople doted on him, most likely due to his father's mild reputation for passing the provincial exams, and called him "young master" (少爷). Feng's stubbornness manifested in determination to pursue his own interests, most notably drawing and painting. Often shirking his lessons with his father, Feng was captivated by the illustrations and woodblock prints in his father's Confucian classics. He stole pigments and dyes from the family store and colored in many of the illustrations, earning him his father's scolding and punishment. Shortly after his father's death from tuberculosis in 1906, Feng happened upon a book of figures, and practiced tracing and drawing figures, using the book as his guide and reference. He continued to pursue his obsession with tracing figures throughout elementary school, earning a growing reputation as the "Little Artist".

In 1914, Feng traveled to Hangzhou to enroll in the Zhejiang First Normal School (now Hangzhou High School), where his career in art took off. The school aspired to manifest the new educational values of the Republic of China and had the highest funding of any provincial school at the time. Many great artistic and literary figures of 20th-century China were educated there, such as Pan Tianshou, Lu Xun, Ye Shengtao and Xia Mianzun. Like many other parents, Feng's mother, recognizing his budding literary talent, encouraged him to attend a school that offered a degree in the humanities in hopes that he would become a man of letters. This education prepared him to become a teacher and give him a solid training in the Chinese classics. In line with traditional social expectations and standards, a career pursuing education and literature was preferable to most anything else, but especially one of trade. Furthermore, Feng's mother wished to see him follow in his father's footsteps, still hoping that the civil service examinations would be reinstated. He entered the school with aspirations to become a teacher, but the school, led by principal Jing Hengyi, emphasized moral and artistic education. It particularly espoused Neo-Confucian ethics and social duties, striving to instill in students a sense of civic duty. Jing and his family had been advocates of educational and political reform, and his leadership soon attracted a cohort of talented and devoted students and faculty, including many literary and artistic figures who became quite renowned. The school's core philosophy was moral education, encouraging and training students to be the new vanguard of social reformers.

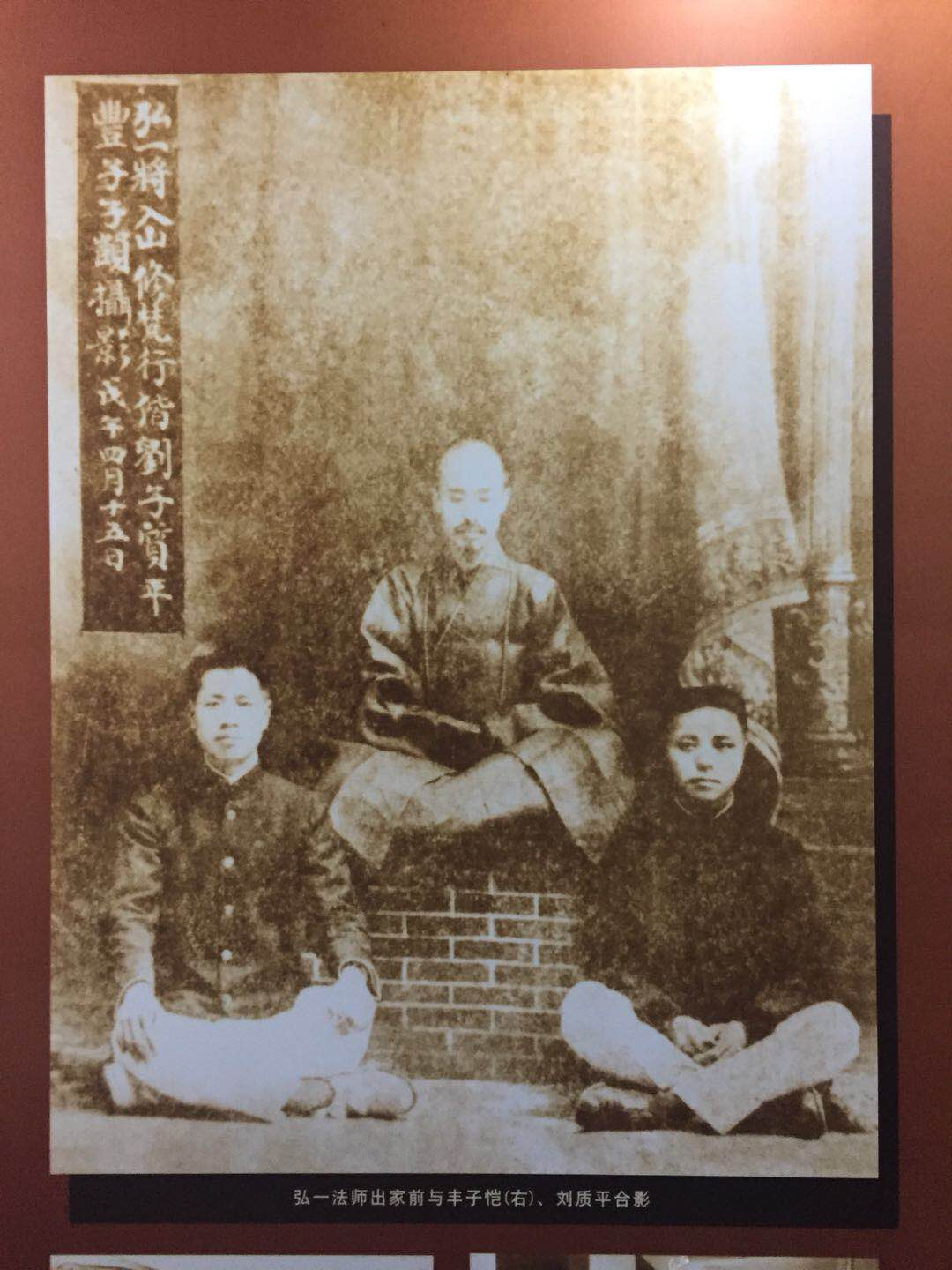
A photo of Hong Yi and two of this students, Feng Tse Kai and Liu Zheping.

In his third year, Li Shutong, who later took up the robes and be known as Hong Yi, taught Feng's music and art classes. Li studied Western painting at the Tokyo School of Fine Art and was infamous for trying to introduce nude painting into the Chinese arts curriculum. More importantly to Feng's development, Li emphasized sketching, not tracing, when teaching students to draw, and encouraged them to draw inspiration from the French En Plein Air. From Li, Feng learned the importance of combining moral character (人品) with artistic accomplishment (畫品). This later became a theoretical and methodological foundation for Feng's style of painting. In contrast to Feng's parents, Li encouraged him to pursue his artistic instinct and later was a profound religious influence on him.

=== Pre-1949 artistic and literary career ===
After graduating from Hangzhou High School in 1919, Feng realized that his meager two years of artistic education had ill prepared him for a life as a professional artist. He was also newly married to Xu Limin, the daughter of a prominent family from Suzhou, and his mother was sick. The financial responsibilities of being a husband and the sole son weighed heavily on his mind. Two of her former classmates started an art school, and shortly after graduation, Feng moved to Shanghai to work as an art teacher. There, he accepted a part-time position as an instructor at the Chengdong Girls' School. Like many other patriot-intellectuals, such as Cai Yuanpei and Liang Qichao, Li Shutong espoused modern reform values. He believed that a new art articulated by modern educated cultural activists was key to reviving Chinese culture and artistic modes of expression. With the May 4th Movement fresh in students' minds, Feng brought these values to the classroom as a teacher. But he grew despondent due to lack of confidence in his ability to teach. In light of all the artists and teachers who had studied abroad, Feng felt he could not claim the title of a modern artist. Thus, after scraping some money together, he left for Tokyo in spring 1921. By this time, Japan was enjoying the benefits of both the Meiji Restoration and being a victor in World War I, and was a haven for Chinese students hoping to receive a modern education. Feng devoted his time to Japanese and European art, as well as attempting to learn violin, English, Japanese, and Russian. He immersed himself in Kabuki theater performances, old bookstores, research groups, and reading groups. He later cited Takehisa Yumeji, whose work he first encountered in Tokyo, as a major figure in his intellectual development. After ten months, he ran out of money, and returned home with a renewed faith in the potential of ink paintings.

After Tokyo, Feng accepted a job at Chunhui High School in Shangyu, a town near Shaoxing. During this time he became part of the White Horse Lake literary group, named after the lake in Shangyu. He was ill at ease in this job, and when political movements clashed, he took it as an out and quit.

Feng became involved in the burgeoning political movements of his time. His classmates and colleagues invited him to be an essayist and artist for many of the radical magazines and publications that were popping up. Journals such as Aesthetic Education, New Youth, Literature Weekly, and Our July featured Feng's early literary and artistic work. Through these publications, his art started to gain traction in Shanghai's intellectual circles and his unique style of paintings came to be called manhua. Embroiled in Shanghai's political and intellectual world, Feng found his art naturally inclined to reproductive technologies and political periodicals. It also embodied the type of Chinese art that could propel the Shanghai intellectuals' wheel of political progress.

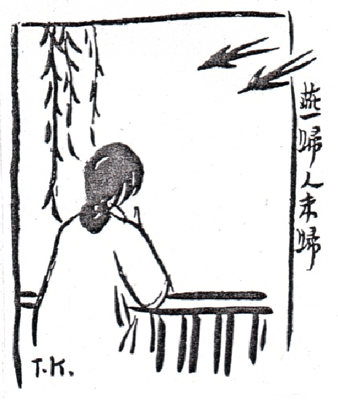

The Kaiming Shudian (開明書店) (Kaiming Book Company) was a private capitalist venture established in Shanghai in 1926 whose goal was to introduce "new knowledge" to young adults. Feng taught art and worked as a cover designer and illustrator at the Kaiming Book Company as well as for other publishers. The Kaiming Book Company published many of Feng's art books and essays. The most important journal the company published for young adults was The Juvenile Student (中學生), and as an editor and primary contributor to the journal, Feng disseminated his artwork, his concern for humanitarianism, and his aesthetic thought to many young students.

Feng continued writing, painting, and publishing in various capacities throughout the changes in the Chinese sociopolitical landscape. During the Second Sino-Japanese War, he drew cartoons depicting the horrors of war. His artwork stands out as unique, especially compared other artists of his time. He chose to not represent the Japanese antagonists as monsters or inhuman, but rather to focus on war's objective tragedies and the suffering it wreaks on ordinary people. Shen Bochen (沈泊尘) was a political cartoonist whose art has been juxtaposed with Feng's cartoons during this period. Feng was a refugee during the war, having to flee his home, Yuanyuan Hall, but he remained committed to his ideals of universal humanism and compassion, as opposed to building nationalism against the Japanese aggressors.

Feng kept in close contact with Li Shutong until his death in 1942. Many of the Buddhist influences in Feng's work stem from Li's impact on Feng's spiritual journey. At the time, Feng was living in Hangzhou and frequently conversed with Ma Yifu, a prominent Neo-Confucian thinker and scholar.

=== Post-1949 career ===
Feng's post-1949 career has received mixed interpretations, given the unsteady availability of materials on his life. Shelley Drake Hawks attempts to recover Feng's career after the revolution using materials in the public domain, as well as interviews with his children and other close acquaintances. Feng's daughter Feng Yiyin has published biographies and anthologies of her father's artwork and essays, including previously unpublished works created after 1949 and during the Cultural Revolution. She asserts that Feng was not "remolded" despite various reeducation attempts, but maintained his old beliefs and ideals even though he faced immense social and political pressure to become less "bourgeois". During this time, Feng turned to translation as a primary form of intellectual output, painting and writing only in secret. In 1954, the Party's art policies shifted and Feng's pre-1949 cartoons came into the spotlight. Although Wang Zhaowen wrote an article in the People's Daily accusing Feng's manhua of unhealthy content, Premier Zhou Enlai praised his artwork and commissioned a compilation of it. Zhou also invited Feng to write a preface to the anthology, which the artist was wary of, in case he accidentally overstepped his bounds. Also in 1954, Feng was invited into the public scene and granted prominent positions in artistic and literary circles. He was offered membership on the Standing Committee of the national Chinese Artists' Association and vice presidency of the regional Shanghai branch. He also helped run various high schools in Shanghai and enjoyed social prominence during the Hundred Flowers period. In 1958, Feng was almost labeled a "Rightist", but avoided controversy by lying low. In the 1960s, he was elected president of the Shanghai Chinese Painting Institute as well as chairman of the Shanghai Artist's Association. Given his prominent stature and popularity among the public, Feng found himself continually rising in leadership positions in the Shanghai cultural establishments. But as time passed, he felt he could no longer keep silent, writing essays that criticized the Great Leap Forward and other Party policies and initiatives. He believed in the ideology, but felt the Party did not truly care for ordinary people. Feng's patrons in the upper echelons of the political systems no longer supported him, and he moved into forced retirement. He painted much of the Protection for Living Beings after 1949, first collaborating with Hong Yi before his death, and then afterward, in contact with Guangqia, a Singaporean monk who helped publish them outside Mainland China.

=== Death and legacy ===
Feng Tse Kai died on September 9, 1975, after being diagnosed with lung cancer. His old home in Shimenwan has been converted into the Feng Zikai Memorial Center, where visitors can tour his old living spaces. Many of his belongings and photos are on display in the permanent exhibition there. Although many of his original artworks were burned throughout the various wars during his lifetime, many of the major museums around China have his artwork in their permanent collections. The Zhejiang Provincial Museum has the whole of the Protection for Living Beings in its archives. Furthermore, Professor Chen Xing founded and runs the Master Hong Yi and Feng Tse Kai Research Center at the Hangzhou Normal University.

Fo Guang Shan Monastery has converted Feng's Protection for Living Beings into religious murals that decorate the walkways up to their museum. Since 2013, the Chinese government has used Feng's paintings as propaganda posters for its China Dream (中国梦) campaign.

The Feng Zikai Chinese Children's Picture Book Award, launched in 2009 to promote Chinese children's picture books, is named in honor of the artist.

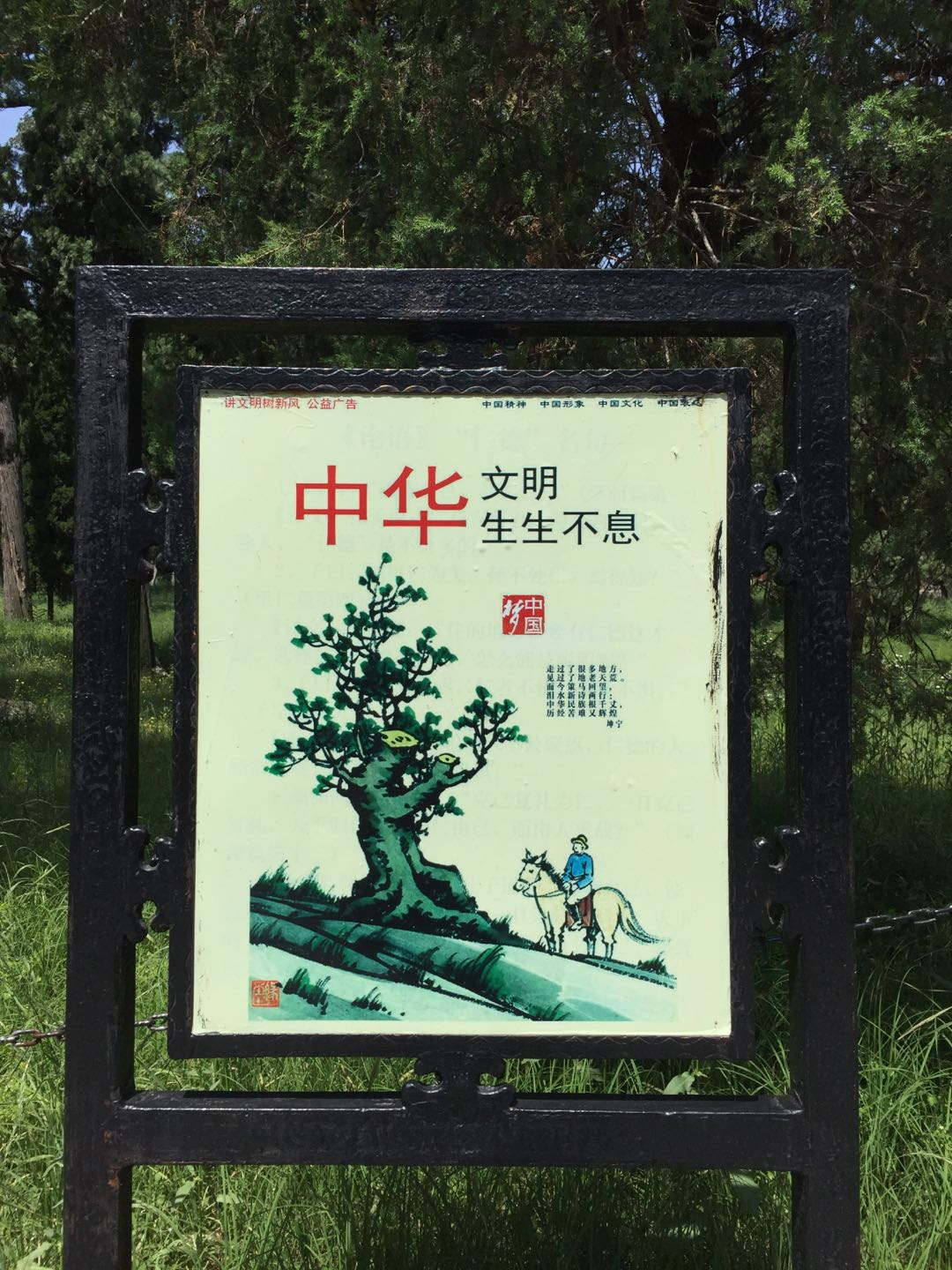
A China Dream poster featuring Feng Tse Kai's work found in Qufu, Shandong.

== Philosophical contributions ==
Feng's two main influences religiously and philosophically were Li Shutong (李叔同) and Ma Yifu (馬一浮). But Feng drew from many different sources, ranging from Chinese and Western art theory to Buddhism and Confucianism, in order to formulate a philosophy of aesthetics as ethics. At the core of this philosophy is the idea of the childlike heart, one that traces back to Mencius (372–289 BC) and was developed by Li Zhi (1527–1602). Feng combined this with a similar concept in Buddhism, and asserted that only one who has a childlike heart can truly see the world for what it is and act rightly. Furthermore, this couples with his fascination with the philosophy behind sketching and the impetus in Chinese paintings that combines the artist's character, emotion, and person into the art to form the idea that children and artists share the so-called sympathetic heart.

His philosophy finds parallels in Schopenhauer, Nietzsche, and other post-Kantian European philosophers who have noted a connection among art, play, work, and children. What makes Feng relatively unique among the prominent Chinese intellectuals of his time is his lack in faith in political systems. He witnessed the fall of the Qing Dynasty, the rise and fall of the Republican China, and the rise of the Chinese Communist Party, as well as European and Japanese imperialism in China. Feng believed that the failures of the various political systems were symptoms of a greater issue: lack of compassion or a sense of morality outside political agendas. Feng critiqued many social injustices and hypocrisies, such as lack of filial piety, the innumerable people living in poverty, and the use of Chinese Buddhist ritual for 'transactional karma'. He believed that people did not truly understand the heart of the issue, and encouraged us to look to children. One of his most famous paintings juxtaposes two children holding hands with a man carrying another in a rickshaw. The painting is titled Two Fathers, and hopes to illustrate how social systems impose barriers onto adults that children are not burdened with. In some way, children represent an uncorrupted version of humanity, and (borrowing from Mahayana Buddhism) people must learn to cut the net asunder.

== Published works ==
Feng was a prolific publisher of paintings, essays, and translations. His works include Writings from Yuanyuan Hall (緣緣堂隨筆), Protection for Living Beings (護生畫集), A Collection of Feng Tse Kai Manhua (豐子愷漫畫集), a biography of Vincent Van Gogh (梵高生活), and a translation of The Tale of Genji. He also illustrated some of Lu Xun's works, such as The True Story of Ah Q, and delivered a series of lectures of Western Classical music, focusing on Russian composers post-Tchaikovsky.

== Quotes ==
In these recent years, my heart has been occupied by four things: deities and stars in the sky, as well as art and children on human earth. My children, who resemble swallows, share the deepest destiny with me, and possess equal standing with deities, stars and art in my heart.

— Feng Tse Kai, "My Children" (1928)

The real artist must be in complete emotional communion with the object or person depicted, to share their joys and sorrows, their tears and laughter. If you take up the brush but lack this all-embracing sympathetic heart then you will never be a true artist

— Feng Tse Kai, "Art and Sympathy"

Our land is being overrun by a vicious enemy. It is as though we are in the throes of a disease, and only strong medication can help us fight this illness and survive. The war of resistance is just such a timely treatment. Yet warfare can never be more than a short-term remedy, and we should be wary of becoming addicted to it. As the virus is eliminated and we regain out health, it is essential that we take proper nourishment. And what kind of nourishment is crucial to out long-term well-being? Peace, happiness, and universal love, and the basic ingredient for 'preserving life' itself: art.

— Feng Tse Kai

== See also ==
- Hong Yi
- Pan Tianshou
- Lu Xun
