= The Saint Paul Hotel =

Historic hotel in Minnesota, U.S.

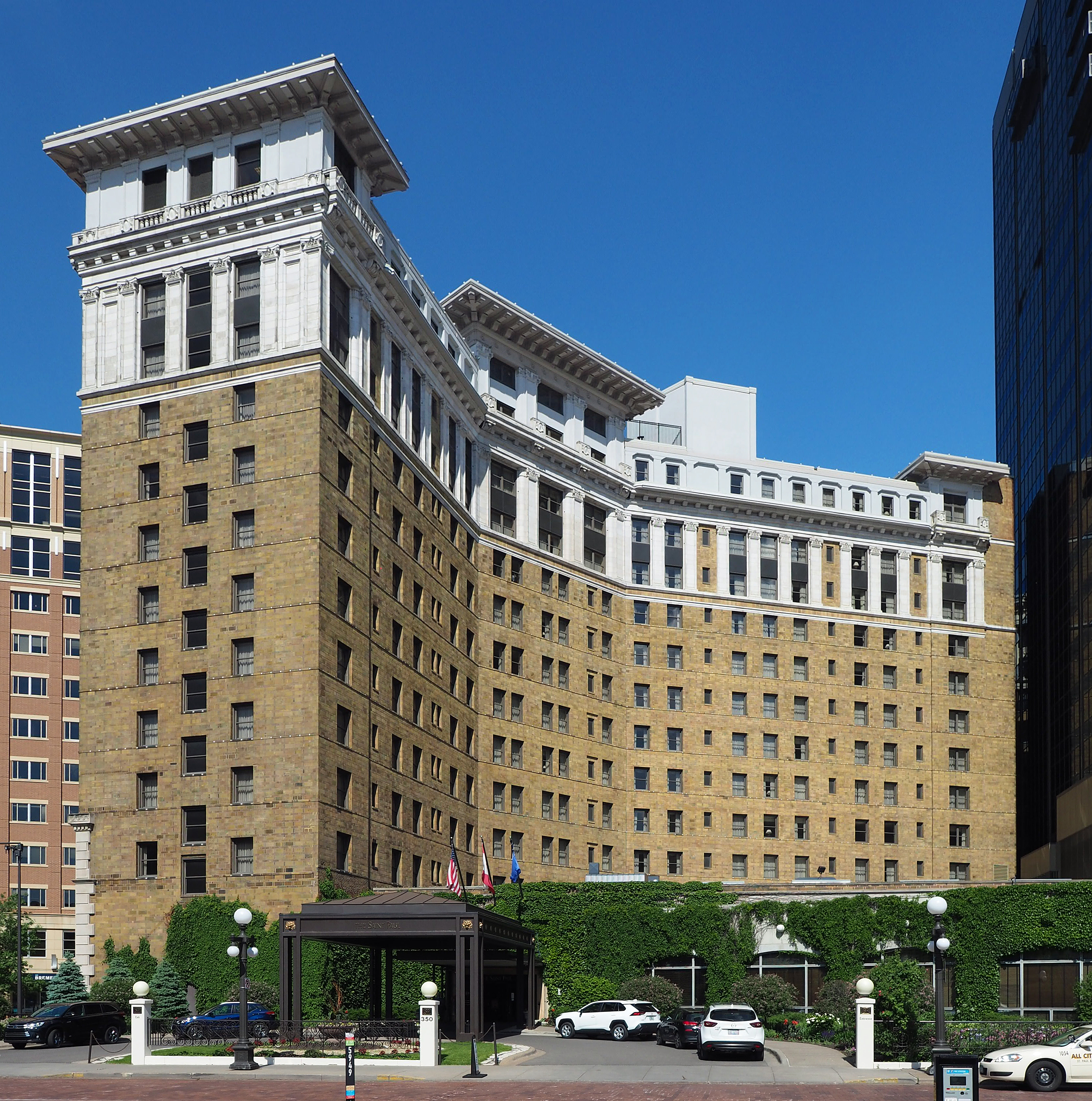
- The Saint Paul Hotel viewed from the west
- Interactive map of the The Saint Paul Hotel area

General information
- Location: 350 N Market St, Saint Paul, Minnesota, U.S.
- Coordinates: 44°56′42″N 93°5′45″W
- Construction started: 1908
- Completed: 1910
- Opened: 1910

Height
- Height: 175.8 feet (53.6 m)

Technical details
- Floor count: 13 above ground 2 below ground
- Lifts/elevators: 4

The Saint Paul Hotel is a landmark hotel in downtown Saint Paul, Minnesota, United States. It was built in 1910 overlooking Rice Park during the "First Great Age" of skyscraper construction. The Renaissance revival style building was one of the most prominent buildings in St. Paul in its era and was nicknamed "St. Paul's Million-Dollar Hotel." It operated for 69 years before closing in 1979 due to declining business. It was renovated and reopened in 1982. It was listed in the Historic Hotels of America program of the National Trust for Historic Preservation in 1991.

== Construction ==
The location, on the corner of W. 5th St. and St. Peter St. had been the site of a hotel since the 60-room Greenman House was built there in 1871. After being destroyed by fire seven years later, it was replaced with the larger Windsor, which operated until a few years before it was torn down to make way for The Saint Paul Hotel.

Lucius Pond Ordway had been negotiating unsuccessfully for three years to build a new modern hotel in St. Paul. Ordway was at the time the president of the fledgling Minnesota Mining and Manufacturing Company (now 3M). A deal was struck in 1908 when Ordway offered to finance the hotel with $1 million of his own money if the community would match the investment. The hotel was built on the site of a prior city landmark, the Windsor hotel. The site was valued at $250,000, which was transferred to Ordway as part of the matching contribution. The building itself was expected to cost $1 million, and the furnishings another quarter million.

The hotel was claimed to be "absolutely fireproof". A rathskeller was dug under the building, carved into the white-colored sandstone that underlaid the site. The hotel has a steel frame with a brick and limestone exterior cladding. Most of the lower nine floors are light brown and most of the upper four floors are white.

It was designed by the then-local architectural firm of Reed and Stem. Stem was an accomplished architect, and Reed an engineer who partnered in 1890. They were later involved in many significant projects including New York's Grand Central Station. Architectural critic Larry Millett described the building as appearing top-heavy due to the "grandiose cornice" on top of the building. Other critics highlighted the Beaux-Arts architecture and the three zones of the hotel with the first floors faced with stone, a terra-cotta midsection, and the cornice described as "gaudy" and "precipitously overhanging".

The hotel opened in 1910. In the 1919 edition of The Encyclopedia Americana, it was called one of St. Paul's most noteworthy buildings of the decade, along with the Saint Paul Public Library. Each of the 300 rooms included a private bath and all rooms had an outside view of a main street or Rice Park. The hotel is eleven stories and built on high ground. At the time of its opening, it was said the view of the Mississippi Valley, from the hotel's roof, was better than from any other location except the dome of the Minnesota State Capitol. The hotel was opened with a formal dedication ceremony held on April 18 that was attended by hundreds of prominent citizens, including two governors and several transcontinental railroad presidents including James J. Hill.

Even before completion in early 1910, a 10,600 sq ft (980 m^{2}) addition was begun. The three-story annex was built to house "sample rooms" for traveling sales reps, and was a unique innovation segregating these rooms from the main hotel and finishing them especially for this usage. The rooms functioned as a regular hotel room for the salesman, but with a display area used to show their products to local merchants.

The hotel's location at an intersection provided a dramatic view of the building when traveling west on 5th. The antenna of the region's first wireless station was on the roof as was a rooftop garden.

== Later years ==
Due to poor occupancy, the hotel closed in 1979. With the support of civic leadership, it was remodeled and reopened in 1982. At this time, the main entrance was moved from the east at 5th and St. Peter Streets to the west facing Rice Park. While renovation was ongoing, the Ordway Center for the Performing Arts, named after a donation from the same family as Lucius Pond Ordway, was constructed across from Rice Park facing the hotel. The renovation was led by architectural firm Hammel, Green and Abrahamson. It is connected by skyways to adjacent Landmark Towers, a 25-story office and residential building, and The Lowry, a 14-story office building. As of 2021, the hotel had 255 guest rooms and suites.

== Notable guests ==
Prominent guests in the first year included then-former president Theodore Roosevelt and current president William Howard Taft, who attended a meeting of the National Conservation Congress there in September to discuss future management of the nation's natural resources. The second year saw a "Monster Democratic Pow Wow" keynoted by William Jennings Bryan.

In the 1920s-30s, Leon Gleckman, known as the "Al Capone of St. Paul," kept a suite at the hotel as a business headquarters. Mike Malone, a United States Treasury Department official observing his activities, also rented a room.

Gene Autry was a week-long guest in 1947, Luciano Pavarotti, George W. Bush and Bill Clinton stayed there as did presidential candidate John F. Kennedy in 1960 when he spoke in the Grand Ballroom to 500 people, with an additional 17,000 in the streets outside. During their 2011 visit to Minnesota, King Harald V and Queen Sonja of Norway stayed at the hotel.

Lawrence Welk played at the hotel early in his career in 1937.

== Preservation ==
A 1987 proposal by the city to host the 1996 Summer Olympics in the Twin Cities said "the famed Saint Paul Hotel is another important example of beautiful preservation", contributing to the city being a "national model for preservation of great historic architecture".
