= George U. Harvey =

American politician (1881–1946)

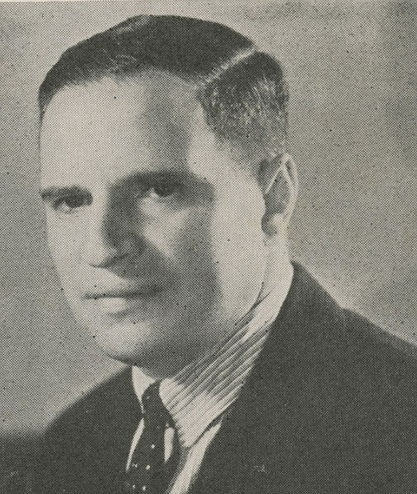
- From 1936 Harvey for Governor campaign poster

7th Borough President of Queens
- In office January 1, 1929 – December 31, 1941
- Preceded by: Bernard M. Patten
- Succeeded by: James A. Burke

Personal details
- Born: August 15, 1881 County Galway, Ireland
- Died: April 6, 1946 (aged 64) New Milford, Connecticut, U.S.
- Party: Republican

George U. Harvey (August 15, 1881 – April 6, 1946) was a Republican politician from Queens, New York City and served as its borough president for twelve years.

== Biography ==
Harvey was born in County Galway, Ireland but emigrated with his family to the United States when he was five years old. His father was wealthy and published a trade magazine, International Trade Confectioner. After studying at Coleraine College in Ireland, Harvey returned to the United States to work as a photojournalist for the journals of the Army and Navy, and then as publisher of his father's journal.

Harvey was commissioned as a Captain in the US Army on May 12, 1917. He served in the first World War, commanding Company A, 308th Infantry, 77th Division. He was honored with the Distinguished Service Cross for the capture of a machine gun nest during the Meuse-Argonne Offensive in 1918.

Following the war, Harvey returned to Queens and began his political career. In 1921 he was elected as a Republican to the Queens County Board of Aldermen and served there for four terms.

In 1928, Harvey demanded an investigation into allegations of graft made against borough president Maurice E. Connolly, an ally of Tammany Hall. Connolly was forced to resign as a result of the investigation, and after the brief interim appointment of Bernard M. Patten, Harvey won election to the office of borough president later that year. Harvey was the first Republican to hold the office.

Harvey oversaw many infrastructure improvements during his tenure, and played a critical role in bringing the 1939 Worlds Fair to Flushing Meadows. He won three terms in office and twice considered running for Governor of New York.

Harvey lost to Democrat James A. Burke in 1941. He died while fighting a fire near his home in New Milford, Connecticut in 1946. Harvey Park in Whitestone is named after him.

Political offices
Preceded by Bernard M. Patten	Borough President of Queens; 1929–1941	Succeeded by James A. Burke
