= Bermel (surname) =

Bermel is a surname. Notable people with the surname include:

- Derek Bermel (born 1967), American composer, clarinetist, and conductor
- Joseph Bermel (1860–1921), American politician
- Peter Bermel (born 1967), German swimmer
