= Dreaming of Home and Mother =

1868 song by John P. Ordway

Single by Evan Williams
- Published: 1868
- Released: October 1916
- Recorded: March 31, 1916
- Genre: Traditional pop
- Label: Victor
- Songwriter: John P. Ordway

1916 Recording
- Evan Williams' version: file; help

"Dreaming of Home and Mother" is an 1868 song by American medical doctor and composer John P. Ordway. It is most popular in Japan and China, as its words were translated into Japanese as "Ryoshū" and into Chinese as "Songbie", respectively.

== History ==
Dreaming of Home and Mother was composed in 1868 by John P. Ordway. On March 11, 1916, tenor Evan Williams recorded the English version for Victor Talking Machine Company in Camden, New Jersey. The English lyrics of Dreaming of Home and Mother had only one stanza, and so it was in early recordings. The 1935 recording published by EMI, with singer Evan Williams included the second stanza, which may have been added by an unknown person. There is also a version that includes the third stanza.

== Lyrics ==
The lyrics of all three stanzas are shown below:

Dreaming of home, dear old home.
Home of childhood and mother-
Oft when I wake 'tis sweet to find
I've been dreaming of home and mother.
Home, dear home, childhood's happy home!
When I played with sister and with brother
'Twas the sweetest joy when we did roam
Over hill and through dale with mother.
Chorus.
Dreaming of home, dear old home,
Home of my childhood and mother-
Oft When I wake 'tis sweet to find
I've been dreaming of home and mother.

Sleep, balmy sleep, close mine eyes,
Keep me still thinking of mother-
Hark! It's her voice I seem to hear-
Yes, I'm dreaming of home and mother.
Angels come soothing me to rest,
I can feel their presence as none other,
For they sweetly say I shall be blest
With bright visions of home and mother.
Chorus.

Childhood has come, come again,
Sleeping, I see my dear mother ---
See her loved form beside me kneel
While I'm dreaming of home and mother.
Mother dear, whisper to me now,
Tell me of my sister and brother, ---
Now I feel thy hand upon my brow ---
Yes, I'm dreaming of home and mother.
Chorus.

== Ryoshū in Japanese ==
The Japanese lyrics of "Dreaming of Home and Mother" were written as "Ryoshū" (旅愁, meaning "Yearning (for home) in travelling") by school music teacher and lyricist Kyūkei Indō (犬童球渓), who also wrote the Japanese lyrics of William Shakespeare Hays's "My Dear Old Sunny Home" as "Kokyō no Haika" (故郷の廃家).

After the first appearance of the song in the collection “Shōka” in 1907, it became widely popular in Japan. In 2007, Ryoshū was chosen as one of the 100 Best Known Japanese Songs.

== Songbie in Chinese ==
In 1915, Chinese artist Li Shutong (Hong Yi) wrote a set of Chinese-language lyrics for "Dreaming of Home and Mother", titling it "Songbie" (Chinese: 送别; pinyin: "Sòngbié"; trans. "Farewell"). Li had been introduced to the "Ryoshū" version of this song while studying in Japan from 1905 to 1910.

=== Chinese lyrics ===
The lyrics in Chinese of "Songbie" are as follows:

長亭外，古道邊，芳草碧連天，

Chángtíng wài, gǔdào biān, fāngcǎo bì lián tiān.
Outside the long pavilion, along the ancient route, fragrant green grass joins the sky,

晚風拂柳笛聲殘，夕陽山外山。
Wǎnfēng fú liǔ díshēng cán, xìyáng shān wài shān.
The evening wind caressing willow trees, the sound of the flute piercing the heart, sunset over mountains beyond mountains.

天之涯，地之角，知交半零落，
Tiān zhī yá, dì zhī jiǎo, zhījiāo bàn língluò.
At the brink of the sky, at the corners of the earth, my familiar friends wander in loneliness and far from home,

一瓢濁酒盡餘歡，今宵别夢寒。
Yī piáo zhuójiǔ jìn yú huān, jīn xiāo bié mèng hán.
One more ladle of wine to conclude the little happiness that remains; tonight my dreams of parting leave me cold.

長亭外，古道邊，芳草碧連天，
Outside the long pavilion, along the ancient route, fragrant green grass joins the sky,

問君此去幾時來？來時莫徘徊。
Wèn jūn cǐ qù jǐ shí lái? Lái shí mò páihuái.

I ask of you, as you go this time, when are you to return? When it's time to come please don't hesitate.

One of the famous version of the song depicts how friends are separated by large distances:

天之涯，地之角，知交半零落，

To the edge of the sky, to the corners of the earth, half of my close friends are scattered,

人生難得是歡聚，唯有别離多。
Rénshēng nán dé shì huānjù, wéi yǒu biélí duō.

In life it is happy reunions that are rare; most often we bid farewell.

== In popular culture ==
"Songbie" was featured as a graduation song in the 1983 Chinese film "My Memories of Old Beijing", itself based on the 1960 novel of the same name by Lin Haiyin, though the lyrics differ slightly in the book.

In July 2018, SNH48 Group issued a cover version of "Songbie", which was entitled "Di Li Qian Xing" (《砥砺前行》). The lyrics were re-written by SNH48 ex-member Wu Yanwen, despite her announcement of departure in January 2018.

The melody of "Songbie" was played at the 2022 Beijing Winter Olympics' closing ceremony as a farewell song.
