= John P. Ordway =

American composer

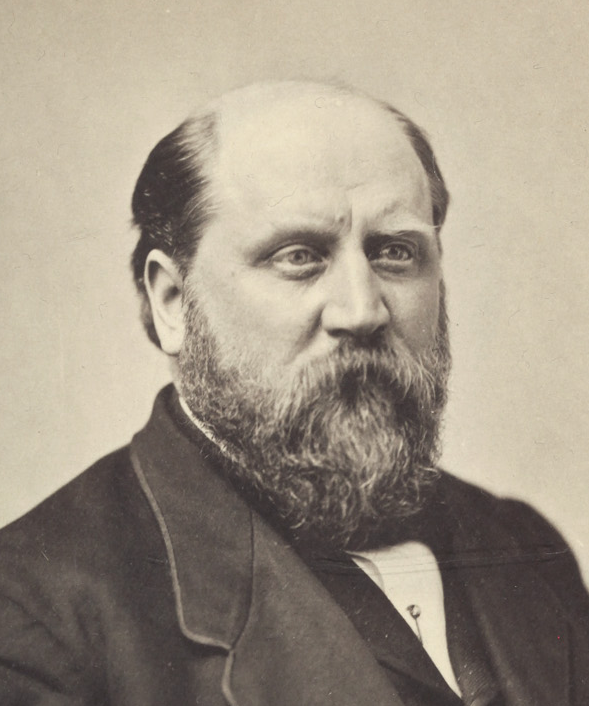

Member of the Massachusetts House of Representatives

Personal details
- Born: August 1, 1824 Salem, Massachusetts, U.S.
- Died: April 27, 1880 (aged 55) Boston, Massachusetts, U.S.
- Resting place: Mount Auburn Cemetery, Cambridge, Massachusetts, U.S.
- Education: Harvard Medical School

Military service
- Years of service: 1861–1865
- Rank: Surgeon
- Unit: 8th Massachusetts Battery
- Battles/wars: American Civil War

John Pond Ordway (August 1, 1824 – April 27, 1880) was an American businessman, composer, medical doctor, and politician.

== Biography ==
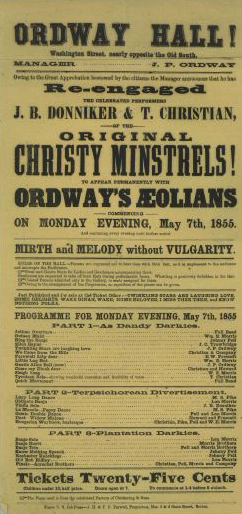
1855 playbill for Ordway's Aeolians at Ordway Hall

Ordway was born in Salem, Massachusetts. In the mid-1840s John Ordway and his father Aaron opened a music store in Boston. John was also a music publisher and composer; his song Twinkling Stars are Laughing, Love (1855) was recorded by the Hayden Quartet as late as 1904. Around 1845 he organized Ordway's Aeolians, a blackface minstrel troupe which performed at Ordway Hall in Boston and also nationally to promote Ordway's publishing business. Future bandleader/composer Patrick Gilmore worked in Ordway's store and also appeared with the Aeolians. James Lord Pierpont's first major composition "The Returned Californian" in 1852 was written expressly for Ordway and his troupe. A number of 19th century songs were written for the Aeolians and/or dedicated to Ordway, including Jingle Bells.

Ordway's composition "Dreaming of Home and Mother" (1868) was a very popular sentimental song of the Civil War era, and continues to be played; it is popular in East Asia in adapted versions. In 1907, a Japanese version with lyrics entitled 旅愁 (Loneliness in Travel) by Kyukei Indou was published in a middle school song book and became popular immediately. Having heard the song while studying at Tokyo Fine Arts and Music School, Li Shutong adapted it, writing a set of original Chinese lyrics and giving it the title of "Songbie"《送別》(Farewell) in 1915. It was used during the closing ceremony of the 2022 Beijing Olympics.

Graduating from Harvard Medical College in 1859, Ordway was one of the first surgeons to volunteer at the start of the Civil War, serving in the 8th Massachusetts Battery. He was one of the Union surgeons sent to tend to the wounded after the Battle of Gettysburg.

Ordway served from 1859 to 1873 on Boston's School Board, and one term (1868) in the Massachusetts House of Representatives. He was opposed to corporal punishment in schools, sponsoring a bill to that effect in the legislature.

Ordway was also responsible for founding the Massachusetts Angler's Association, the forerunner to the Massachusetts Fish and Game Association. He died in Boston, Massachusetts.

His nephew Lucius Pond Ordway (the son of his older brother Aaron Ordway) was a major backer of 3M in its early days and served as its president. Another of Aaron's sons, Samuel Hanson Ordway, was a prominent New York City lawyer and civil service reformer; Samuel's wife was painter Frances Hunt Throop.

== Published songs ==
- "The Death of Taylor", composed by, 1850
- "Old Sam Grid Iron", composed by, 1850
- "Home Delights", composed by, 1854
- "Wake! Dinah, Wake!", composed by, 1854
- "Know Nothing Polka", composed by, 1855
- "Twinkling Stars are Laughing, Love", composed by, 1855
- "Mother, Dear, I'm Thinking of You", composed by, 1857
- "Silver Moonlight Winds", composed by, 1858
- "Let Me Kiss Him for His Mother", composed by, 1859
- "Dreaming of Home and Mother", composed by, 1868 - Its translated songs are very popular in Japan and China/Taiwan.

== See also ==
- Ordway Hall (Boston)
- 1868 Massachusetts legislature
