= Max Steuer =

American lawyer

- Born: September 16, 1870; Homonna (Humenne), Austria-Hungary
- Died: August 21, 1940 (aged 69); Jackson, New Hampshire
- Education: City College of New York, Columbia University Law School
- Occupation: Lawyer
- Children: 3

Max David Steuer (16 September 1870 – 21 August 1940) was a prominent American trial lawyer in the first half of the 20th century.

== Personal life ==
Steuer was born on September 16, 1870 (or 1871), in the town of Homonna, Austria-Hungary (now Humenne, Slovakia). In 1876 he arrived in the United States with his father and his mother. He attended the City College of New York from 1886 to 1889. He received his law degree from Columbia University in 1893 and was admitted to the New York state bar the same year.

Steuer married Bertha Popkin in 1897. The couple had three children: Aron, Ethel and Constance.

Steuer was active in Tammany Hall for many years, especially during the leadership of John F. Curry in the late 1920s and the early 1930s. In 1938, he served as a delegate to the New York state constitutional convention.

He served as President of the American Jewish Congress.

Steuer died in Jackson, New Hampshire, on August 21, 1940.

== Legal career ==
Steuer represented some plaintiffs and in some cases, served as a special prosecutor, but he made his name as counsel for the defense.

His first trial that gave him a reputation was the defense of actor Raymond Hitchcock in 1908.

Steuer is best known for his successful defense of the factory owners after the Triangle Shirtwaist Factory Fire. In March 1911 a fire broke out on the eighth floor of the factory, and quickly spread to the ninth and tenth floors. The escape routes were locked or overcome by the fire. One hundred forty-six women, adolescent girls, and men lost their lives. Steuer defended the owners, Max Blanck and Isaac Harris, against criminal charges arising from the fire and its circumstances. The two were acquitted. The acquittal is attributed to Steuer's cross-examination and impeachment of one of the surviving employees.

Steuer won acquittals in numerous other cases. Defendants who were acquitted included sports promoter Tex Rickard, banker Charles E. Mitchell and former Attorney General Harry Daugherty. Steuer, though a skillful litigator, also saw clients convicted, such as Maurice E. Connolly, or saw the loss of divorce cases, as the one for W.E.D. Stokes.

Working for the employers, Steuer negotiated significant collective bargaining agreements in the women's clothing industry.

Working as a prosecutor, Steuer won convictions against Bernard K. Marcus and Saul Singer for their roles in the failure of the Bank of United States.
