= Bernard M. Patten =

American politician

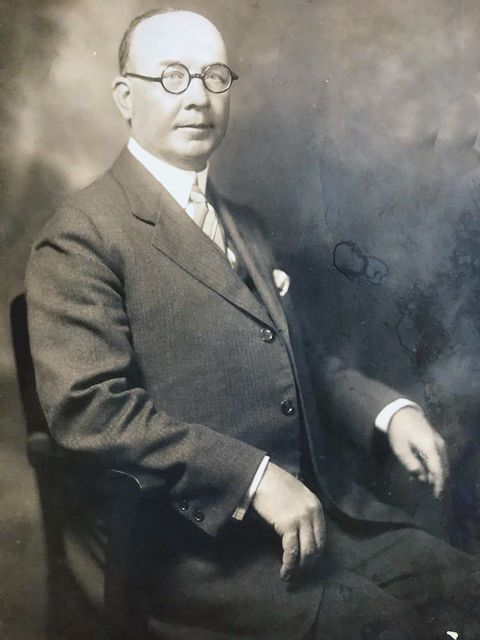
- Patten in 1928

Borough President of Queens
- In office 1928–1928
- Preceded by: Maurice E. Connolly
- Succeeded by: George U. Harvey

Personal details
- Born: September 29, 1881 Kidderminster, Worcestershire, England
- Died: November 28, 1963 (aged 82) Jamaica, Queens, New York, US

Bernard M. Patten (September 29, 1881 – November 28, 1963) was a politician from Queens, New York, USA. He was borough president of Queens for seven months in 1928 following the resignation of Maurice E. Connolly in April of that year.

== Life ==
Patten arrived in the United States as an immigrant in 1900 when he was still a child. He was active in New York City and state politics, and held a number of elective and appointive offices in the twenty years before he became borough president.

Patten was a member of the New York State Senate (2nd D.) from 1913 to 1916, sitting in the 136th, 137th, 138th and 139th New York State Legislatures. He was at times Queens Park Department Secretary, Deputy State Comptroller, and the city's Commissioner of Markets. Patten was named the Market Commissioner by Mayor Jimmy Walker on Connolly's advice.

When Connolly resigned due to the ongoing Queens sewer scandals, Patten was elected by the Queens Democratic Party leadership to fill the rest of the term. He was well liked by the Queens leadership and an ally of Connolly, but Mayor Walker was thought to not be pleased with the selection, fearing the taint of the scandal would damage Democrats in the 1928 elections. Walker did not find time to administer the oath of office to Patten, which some political observers felt was a snub. Although he was popular with the party leadership, his election was protested by some civic organizations and other members of the public.

Patten appeared before a grand jury to testify about the sewer scandal in Queens, but his appearance was voluntary and he was not indicted or subpoenaed. He easily won his party's nomination for Borough President in the election later that year, but he lost to Republican candidate George U. Harvey, who made fighting political corruption and Connolly's involvement in the sewer graft scandal central themes of his campaign.

Patten ran again unsuccessfully for the nomination in 1929, though he was still popular with many in his party. The 1929 primary was hotly contested, and the party infighting was considered a factor in losing the race to Harvey and the Republicans. In order to ease relations and help unify the various factions among the Democrats, Mayor Walker named Patten to become the borough's Commissioner of Taxes and Assessment in 1930. He died on November 28, 1963, at the age of 82.

New York State Senate
Preceded by Dennis J. Harte	New York State Senate; 2nd District; 1913–1916	Succeeded by Peter M. Daly
Political offices
Preceded by Maurice E. Connolly	Borough President of Queens; 1928	Succeeded by George U. Harvey
