= Frances Hunt Throop =

American painter

Frances Throop Ordway
- Born: Frances Eliza Hunt Throop; 1860; New York City
- Died: 1933 (aged 72–73); East Hampton, New York
- Known for: Painting
- Spouse: Samuel H. Ordway (m. 1894)

Frances Hunt Throop (1860–1933) was an American painter. She was known for her portraiture and still life painting.

== Biography ==
Throop was born in 1860 in New York City. She studied at the Art Students League of New York. She was a member of the Brooklyn Art Association and the National Association of Women Painters and Sculptors.

Throop exhibited her work at the Palace of Fine Arts at the 1893 World's Columbian Exposition in Chicago, Illinois.

== Family ==
Throop's grandfather was George B. Throop, a New York state senator and later Michigan state representative; her great-uncle Enos T. Throop was the governor of New York from 1829 to 1832. In 1894, she married lawyer Samuel H. Ordway (1860–1934) (brother of businessman Lucius Pond Ordway, nephew of composer John Pond Ordway) and ended her painting career. Samuel Ordway and Frances Throop Ordway had two children, Frances Hanson Ordway (1898–1903) and Samuel H. Ordway Jr. (1900–1971). Samuel Jr. was, like his father, an advocate of civil service reform, serving on civil service commissions on both the state and federal levels. He was also active in conservation; the Samuel H. Ordway, Jr. Memorial Preserve in South Dakota was created in 1975 in his memory by The Nature Conservancy. Frances Throop Ordway died in 1933 in East Hampton, New York.

== Gallery ==
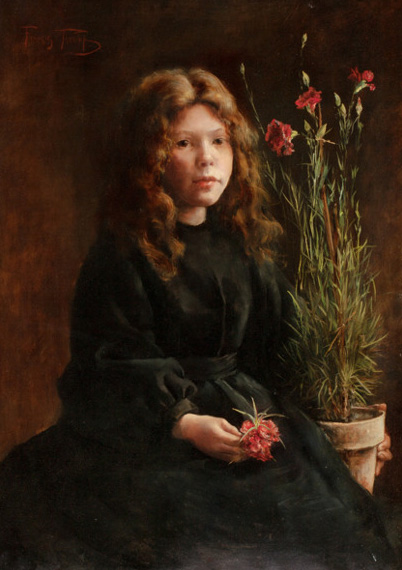
Spring Carnations, by Frances Hunt Throop, 1893
