= Samuel H. Ordway Jr. =

American lawyer

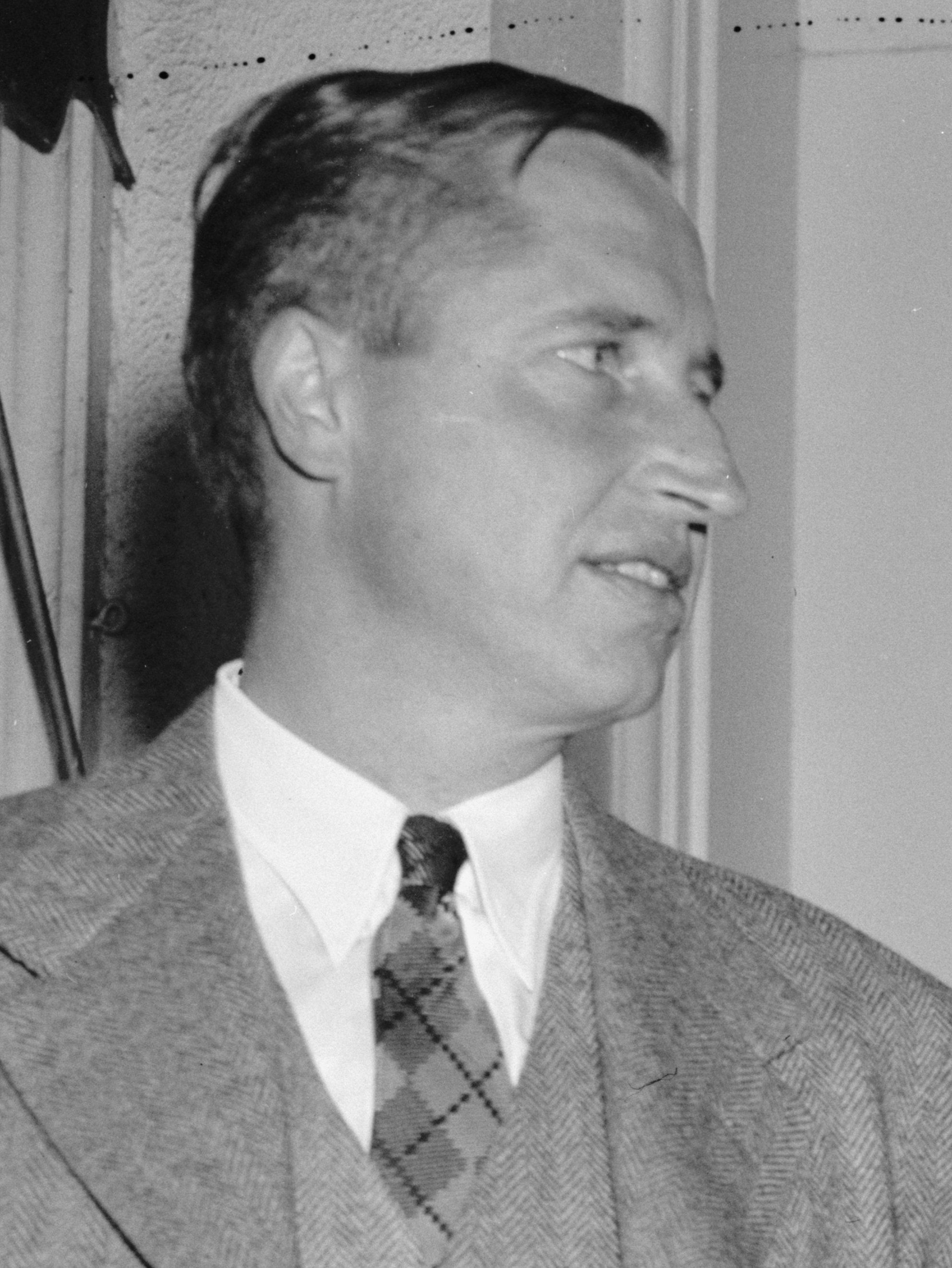
Ordway in 1937

Samuel Hanson Ordway Jr. (born New York City, New York, January 20, 1900; died New York City, New York, November 18, 1971) was an American lawyer, civil service reformer, personnel administrator, writer, and conservationist. He was a founder of the Conservation Foundation (a conservation policy group that merged into the World Wildlife Fund in 1990) and president of the organization in the mid-1960s.

== Family and early life ==
Ordway was the son of Samuel H. Ordway (1860-1934), a lawyer, judge, and civil service reformer, and Frances Hunt Throop (1860-1933), a notable painter from a family prominent in New York State politics. His uncle Lucius Pond Ordway (1862-1948) was a wealthy Minnesota businessman, an early backer and president of 3M.

Ordway graduated from Harvard University in 1921 and Harvard Law School in 1924.

== Humor ==
In 1924 Ordway and artist/illustrator Francis Wenderoth Saunders, a fellow Harvard graduate, published Little Codfish Cabot at Harvard, with drawings by Saunders and text by Ordway. This was followed by two more books with Saunders, An Elegant History of New York Society for Young Persons of Quality in 1926, and An Elegant History of Political Parties in 1928. In 1929 Ordway published a novel titled The Intellect is a Brute.

== Public service ==
After joining the New York bar in 1925, Ordway became active in the New York Civil Service Reform Association, which his father had been president of. He was asked to help draft the civil service provisions for the new New York City charter which was approved in 1936, and was appointed as a New York City Civil Service Commissioner by Mayor Fiorello La Guardia. In October 1937 Ordway was appointed to the U.S. Civil Service Commission, where he served for two years. After his resignation he was appointed as president Roosevelt's representative to the First Council of Personnel Administration (an effort to coordinate federal personnel policies). He then served briefly as president of the National Civil Service League before he was activated as a member of the Naval Reserve.

During World War II Ordway worked in personnel policy and management for the Navy, ending the war as Chief of the Civilian Personnel in the Executive Office of the Secretary of the Navy and the Navy's representative to the War Manpower Commission.

From 1940 to 1958, Ordway was "of counsel" with his father's former firm of Spencer, Ordway, & Wierum.

== Conservation ==
In 1948 Ordway helped Henry Fairfield Osborn Jr., president of the New York Zoological Society, found the Conservation Foundation, a group which funded research and policy work on conservation. Laurance Rockefeller was a major supporter. The foundation published "A Conservation Handbook" by Ordway in 1949. Ordway went on to publish another short work on conservation in 1953, "Resources and the American dream, including a theory of the limit of growth", and a longer one, "Prosperity Beyond Tomorrow", in 1956. He served as executive vice president of the Conservation Foundation from 1948 to 1962 and president for several years starting in 1962. He also served several terms as a member of the Secretary of the Interior's advisory committee on conservation.

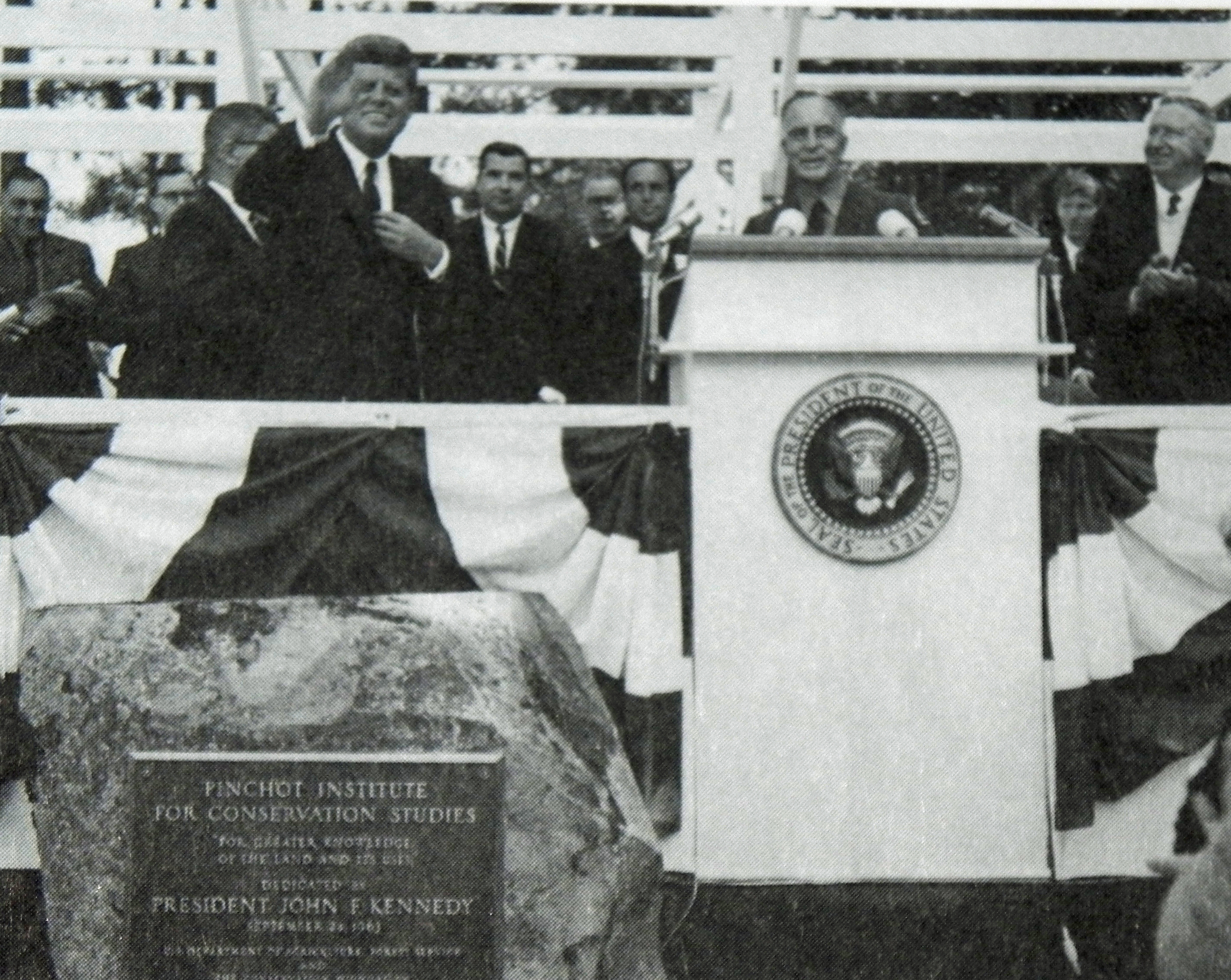
The dedication of the Pinchot Institute; President Kennedy on the left, Ordway on the extreme right, applauding

On September 24, 1963, Ordway, as president of the Conservation Foundation, shared a stage with President Kennedy at the dedication of the Pinchot Institute for Conservation at Grey Towers in Milford, Pennsylvania.

== Family ==
Ordway married Anna Wheatland (1900-1999) on June 14, 1924. Their children were Anna Hanson Ordway (1925-1934), Ellen Ordway (1927-2018), Samuel H. Ordway III, and Stephen Wheatland Ordway (1936-1952), who died after slipping and falling out a window on the 16th floor. Ellen Ordway became a biology professor specializing in bees.

== Legacy ==
Ordway's cousin Katherine Ordway (1899-1979) was influenced by his work and worked with The Nature Conservancy to preserve land in several areas of the country. The first tract of land purchased, 7,600 acres of prairie near Leola, South Dakota, is now known as the Samuel H. Ordway Jr. Memorial Preserve.

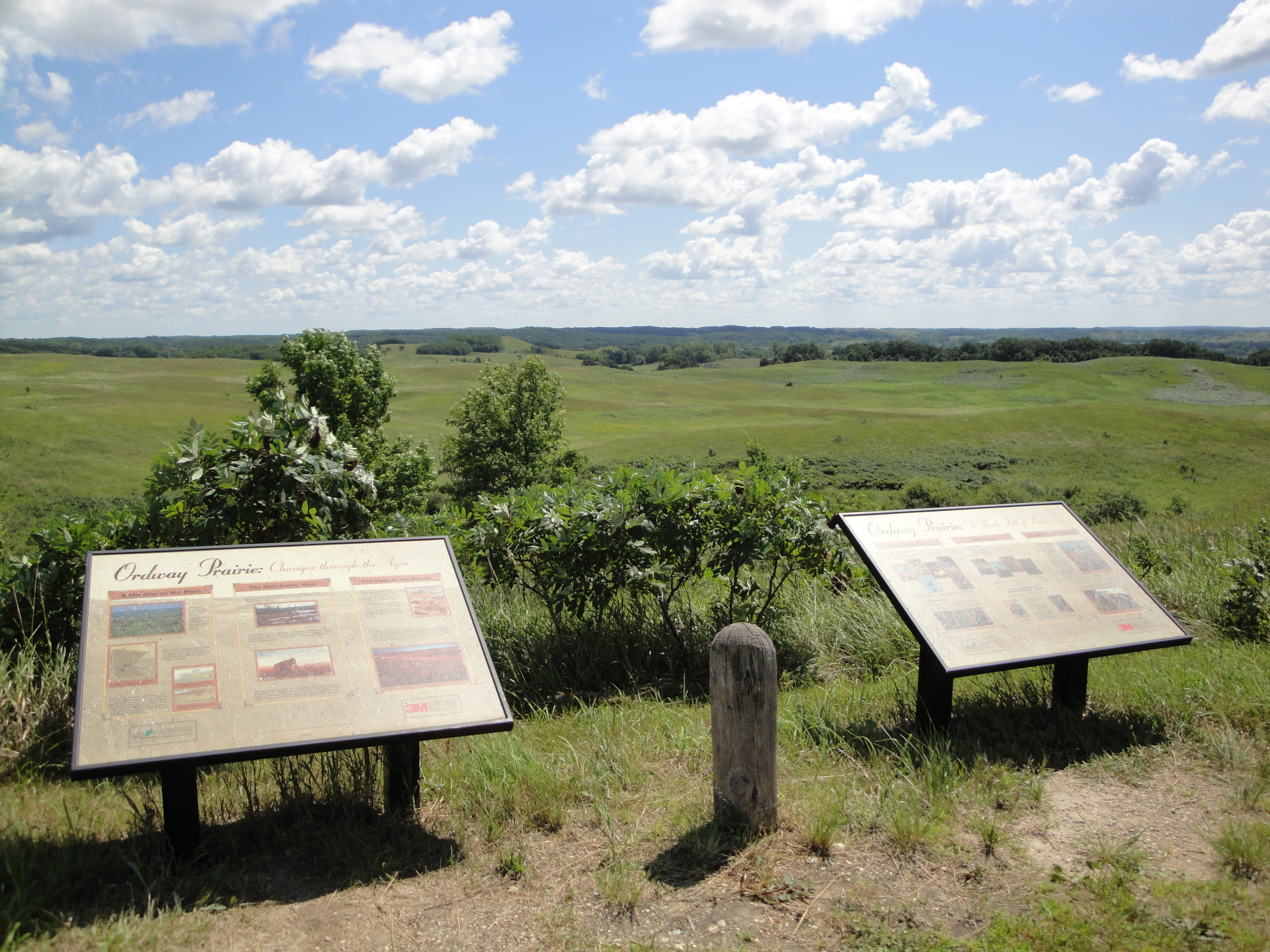
View of Ordway Prairie preserve
