= Leon Gleckman =

American bootlegger and criminal (1894–1941)

Leon Gleckman (1894 – July 1941) was a Belarusian Jewish immigrant to the United States. Gleckman rose to prominence as a bootlegger during Prohibition and as a leader within what has come to be known as Jewish-American organized crime. So great was his power that Gleckman was eventually dubbed, "The Al Capone of Saint Paul."

== Life ==
Gleckman was born, as the third of eight children, into an Orthodox Jewish family in Minsk, which was still part of the Russian Empire, in 1894. His father, Gershom Gleckman, was later described in his son's prison records as "a strict disciplinarian, a total abstainer, and law-abiding man." His mother, Nechama "Nettie" Gleckman, was the daughter of a rabbi from Austria-Hungary and has been described in Government files as, "a religious, tolerant woman." In 1903, the Gleckman family immigrated to the United States via London and Nova Scotia, and ultimately the border crossing at Port Huron, Michigan, before settling in a heavily Ashkenazi Jewish neighborhood on the West Side of St. Paul, Minnesota. As a teenager, Gleckman married Jewish clerical worker Rose Goldstein, with whom he fathered and raised three daughters.

== Career ==
In the 1920s and 1930s, Gleckman, known as the "Al Capone of St. Paul", kept a permanent suite at The Saint Paul Hotel as his business headquarters. Using an unlisted telephone, Gleckman made regular calls from his suite to business associates in Chicago, New Orleans, Milwaukee, New York City, Havana, and Montreal.

Michael Malone, a United States Treasury Department agent who had successfully infiltrated the Chicago Outfit, also rented a room in the hotel while investigating Gleckman.

St. Paul became known as the "sanctuary for criminals" of the Midwest, due to its corrupt politicians and police chiefs who agreed to ignore criminality. The "Layover Agreement", an unofficial contract between criminals and John O'Connor, St. Paul Chief of Police from 1900 to 1920, started in 1900. In 1930, Gleckman engineered the appointment of mobbed up police detective Tom Brown as chief of police. Police officers Charles Tierney and Joseph Dahill later told the FBI that, during Brown's 1930–1932 term as Chief, Gleckman was granted a monopoly on illegal gambling and ran it from his suite at the St. Paul Hotel.

== Death ==
While driving home in July 1941, Gleckman crashed his car into an abutment at Kellogg Boulevard and Wacouta Street in St. Paul while driving drunk. He died almost instantly of a fractured skull.

While Gleckman's death certificate reads, "probably accidental", former St. Paul police officer Joseph Sherin later told Paul Maccabee, "You can't prove it, but in my heart, as a policeman, I think [he] wanted to do himself in. We all think Leon killed himself... He was due to go to Federal prison. He was the king of the bootleggers and he didn't fancy sitting in the can."
