= Rice Park =

Park in Saint Paul, Minnesota, United States

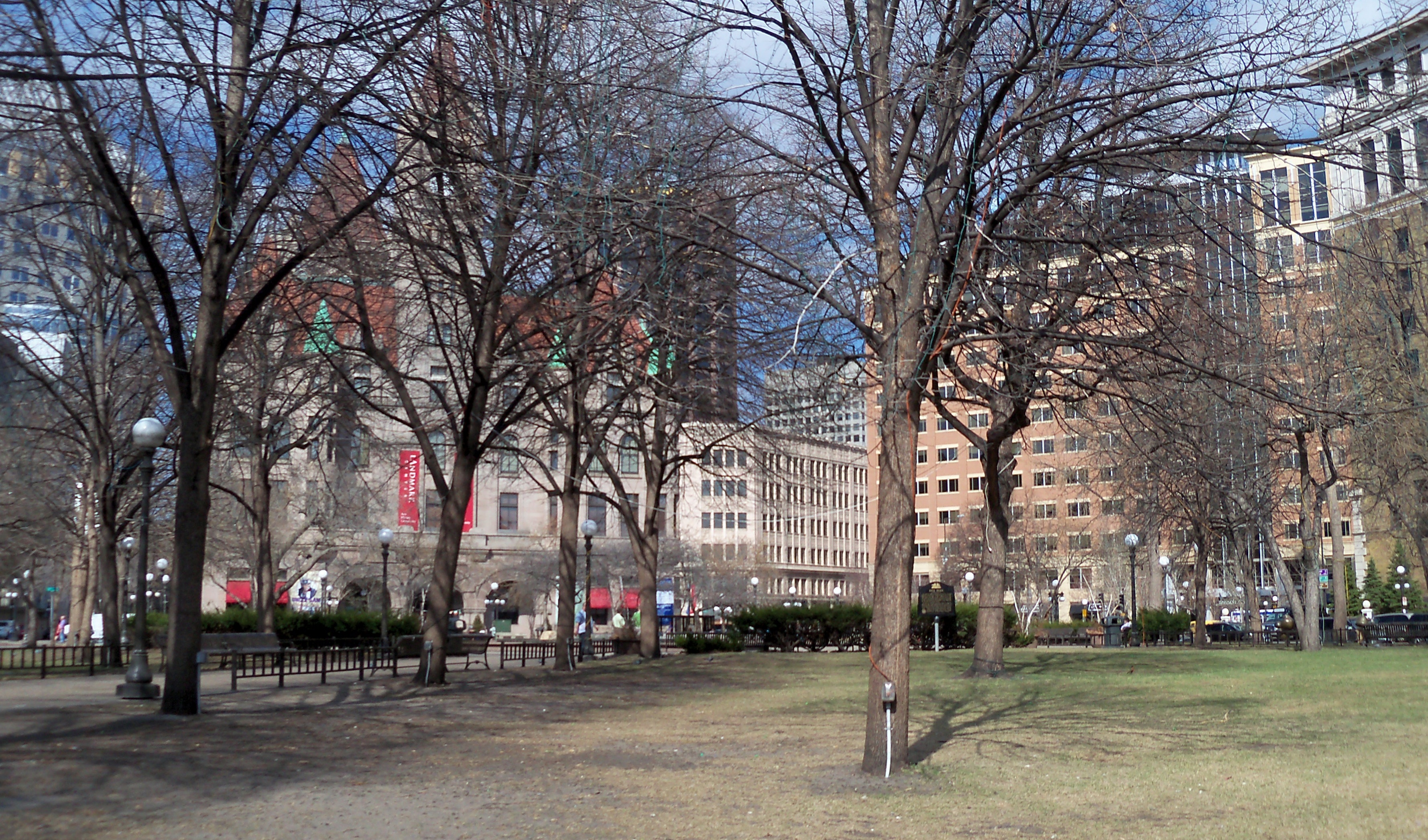
- Interactive map of Rice Park
- Type: Urban park
- Location: Saint Paul, Minnesota, U.S.
- Coordinates: 44°56′41″N 93°5′50″W
- Area: 2 acres (0.81 ha)
- Status: Open all year

Rice Park is a public park in downtown Saint Paul, Minnesota, United States.

Features of the park include a fountain, a bandstand, sculptures of characters from the Peanuts cartoons and an ice-rink during the winter months. Rice Park is one of the venues of the Saint Paul Winter Carnival; in selected years, an ice palace is built as part of the festivities.

Rice Park is bordered by the 1902 Landmark Center to the north, the 1910 Saint Paul Hotel to the east, the 1917 George Latimer Central Library to the south, and the Ordway Center for the Performing Arts to the west.

== History ==
The park is named after territorial Minnesota Senator Henry Mower Rice, who donated the land to the city in 1849 along with St. Paul banker John Irvine. The lands of the park were first used by settlers to dry laundry or graze animals, including sheep. After the area was designated a park, a German florist grew flowers and vegetables on the grounds in exchange for maintenance. Trees were donated by in 1862 by St. Paul mayor John S. Prince, a fountain and bandstand were added in 1872, and electric lights were installed in 1883. Positioned within multiple traffic crossroads, it was a place for people of mixed sociopolitical backgrounds to meet; after dark, this included gay men cruising for sex.

A 1965 renovation was spearheaded by the Women's Institute of Saint Paul, when a statue of a girl created by Wisconsin artist Alonzo Hauser was added as a centerpiece to the park. Renovations in 1980s included replacement of benches and paths, and a renovation in the year 2000 included a redesign of the fountain area. A $2.3 million renovation in the 2010s included a new power grid and stormwater collection and irrigation system, along with wider pathways, new benches, and café tables.
