= Frederick Bowley (politician) =

American politician (1851–1916)

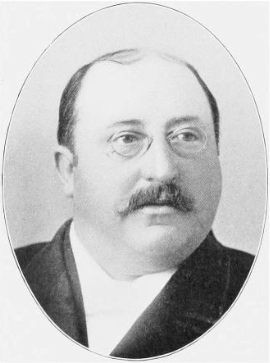

Borough President of Queens
- In office 1898–1901
- Preceded by: Office established
- Succeeded by: Joseph Cassidy

Personal details
- Born: December 19, 1851 New York City, U.S.
- Died: September 15, 1916 (aged 64–65) Hart Island, New York, U.S.

Frederick Bowley (1851–1916) was an American politician, who served as the first executive of the Borough of Queens in New York City.

== Biography ==
Bowley was born December 19, 1851, in New York City. He had training to be a butcher, and after buying land in Long Island City, New York in 1887, he proceeded to operate butcher shops there and in the Queens County towns of Astoria and Flushing.

Bowley was an alderman representing Long Island City from 1895 to 1897. In November 1897, with the creation of the boroughs of New York City) and the consolidation of the City of New York, the offices of the five borough presidents were created, and Bowley was elected as the inaugural Queens Borough President effective January 1, 1898.

In 1901, he was succeeded by Joseph Cassidy. Bowley later served as county clerk of Queens.

He participated prominently in the formation of "the Queens County Democracy" by Democrats in Queens, to oppose Cassidy's re-election campaign in 1903.

From about 1911 until 1951, a small park in the Long Island City neighborhood was called Bowley Angle after him.

He died while visiting Hart Island on September 15, 1916.

Political offices
Preceded by none	Borough President of Queens; 1898–1901	Succeeded by Joseph Cassidy
