= Ordway Hall (Boston) =

Theatre in Massachusetts, United States

Coordinates: 42°21′25.68″N 71°3′35.42″W

Ordway Hall (est.1852) was a theatre in Boston, Massachusetts located off Washington Street in the former Province House. John P. Ordway established and managed the hall, which specialized in "negro minstrelsy," particularly the Ordway Aeolians, his own troupe.

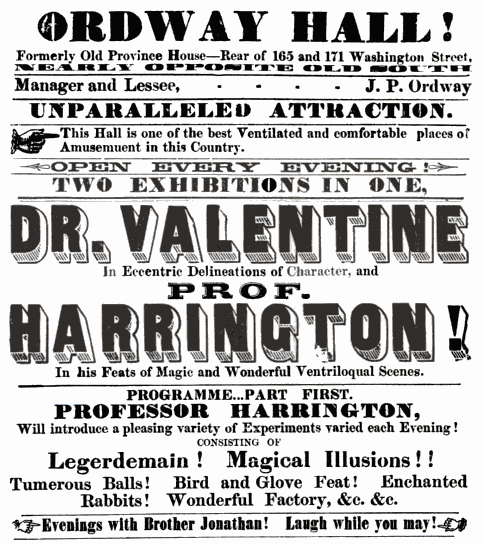
Advertisement for Dr. Valentine and Prof. Harrington, Ordway Hall, Boston, 19th century "Feats of magic and wonderful ventriloqual scenes. ... Experiments ... consisting of legerdemain! magical illusions!! tumerous balls! bird and glove feat! enchanted rabbits! wonderful factory, &c. &c."

== History ==
Ordway Hall opened February 9, 1852. "The Old Province House, in the rear of 165 and 171 Washington-street, has been neatly fitted up for a concert-room, under the name of Ordway Hall. At this comfortable and well-ventilated place of amusement, conducted on the best principles, the 'Aeolians,' under the management of J.P. Ordway, in the double capacity of 'citizens' and 'darkies' give nightly concerts which are well attended." "The whole building was changed in appearance, its interior having been remodeled for the purpose of accommodating a company of ... vocalists. ... The outside was covered with a coat of yellowish mastic."

A travel guidebook of 1856 recommended the theatre: "The walls of this old house, that once echoed with kings' decrees, eloquent speeches, and loyal toasts, now ring with the gay laugh, tender songs, and humorous jests of the negro minstrel. The hall ... has become deservedly popular, as order is preserved, and all that may offend banished."

"Lon Morris, Billy Morris, and other famous minstrels of the day were in the company, and here it was that P.S. Gilmore, the well-known band-master, began his professional career by playing on the tambourine as an end-man." In 1858, E. Kelly worked as musical director, and James McGee as business manager of the hall.

In 1851, the 12-year-old future founder of pedestrianism Edward Payson Weston worked at the hall "selling candies ... during each secular evening." Around 1856, the Parent Washington Total Abstinence Society met weekly in the hall. On September 17, 1856, during the elaborate citywide festivities inaugurating the new statue of Benjamin Franklin at City Hall, "the entrance to Ordway Hall ... was decorated with flags, and a portrait of Franklin." Police arrested a woman at the hall in 1860 "for being in male attire."

By 1864, Morris Bros., Pell & Trowbridge occupied the hall. "On Tuesday evening October 25, 1864 a fire gutted the interior, leaving only the walls. The building was then turned into an office building."

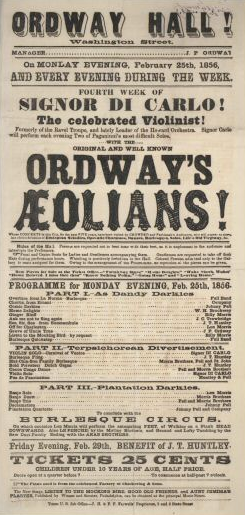
Advertisement for Ordway Hall, Boston, 1856

== Events ==
- 1853, January – Uncle Tom's Cabin
- 1855 – J.B. Donniker & T. Christian
- 1858, May – Buckley's Serenaders
- 1859, July – George Christy's Minstrels.
- 1859, December – Amanda M. Spence, psychic medium
- 1861 – Morris Brothers, Pell & Trowbridge's Minstrels
- Mr. Gurnet and "the visible spirit Rapping Bell, the Mystic Gold Box, Bottle Feat, Crystal Casket"
