= Joseph Cassidy (politician) =

American politician (died 1920)

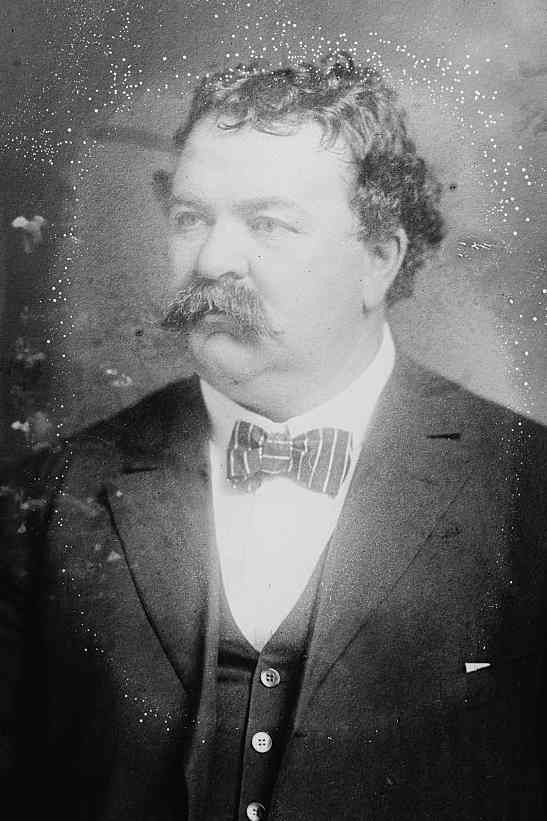
- Joseph Cassidy in 1911

Borough President of Queens
- In office 1902–1905
- Preceded by: Frederick Bowley
- Succeeded by: Joseph Bermel

Personal details
- Born: c. 1866
- Died: November 21, 1920 Far Rockaway, New York, U.S.

Joseph Cassidy (1866? – November 21, 1920), sometimes known as Curley Joe, was a Democratic politician from Queens, New York City. He wielded a large amount of political power in the early 1900s, and was frequently accused of abusing it.

Cassidy's first controversy arose when he was elected alderman of Long Island City, Queens while holding the appointed office of excise commissioner. Despite this apparent conflict of interest, he did not resign either of the positions, and won the right to hold both jobs after a court battle.

He attained the leadership of the Queens County Democratic Party just prior to time of the consolidation of New York City in 1898, and in 1902 won the first of two two-year terms as Borough President of Queens. Although he was a political dictator, he also presided over a large amount of infrastructure and real estate development in Queens, earning him the nickname "the King of Queens." Despite an annual salary of $5,000 as borough president, he leveraged his office to become very wealthy, having purchased more than half million dollars of real estate in Queens.

His wealth and spending were well known. In his obituary, The New York Times wrote:

"Cassidy's expenditures during his two terms as Borough President were regal. He owned a steam yacht and an automobile, a string of fast trotters, a stock farm in California, a house in Long Island City and a country home in Far Rockaway. He was also a chicken fancier, and his game cocks were known from one end of the country to the other."

Cassidy was accused of 47 counts of financial impropriety by Queens residents during his time in office. These were investigated and 24 were upheld by Mayor Seth Low's administration, but no charges stemming from these accusations were brought against him.

Cassidy lost re-election in 1905 to reform candidate Joseph Bermel but remained active in party politics. He still exercised great influence, which he used to his financial advantage. In 1912, he was indicted on charges of attempting to sell a nomination to the New York Supreme Court bench to William Willet for $30,000. Cassidy and Willet were both convicted of the scheme, with Cassidy sentenced to a year in Sing Sing Prison.

He was paroled in early 1916 and did not attempt to go back to politics. He was indicted by a Nassau County grand jury in 1920 on gambling charges, but died in his Far Rockaway home of apoplexy later that year.

Political offices
Preceded by Frederick Bowley	Borough President of Queens; 1902–1905	Succeeded by Joseph Bermel
