= Samuel H. Ordway =

American lawyer and judge

Samuel Ordway
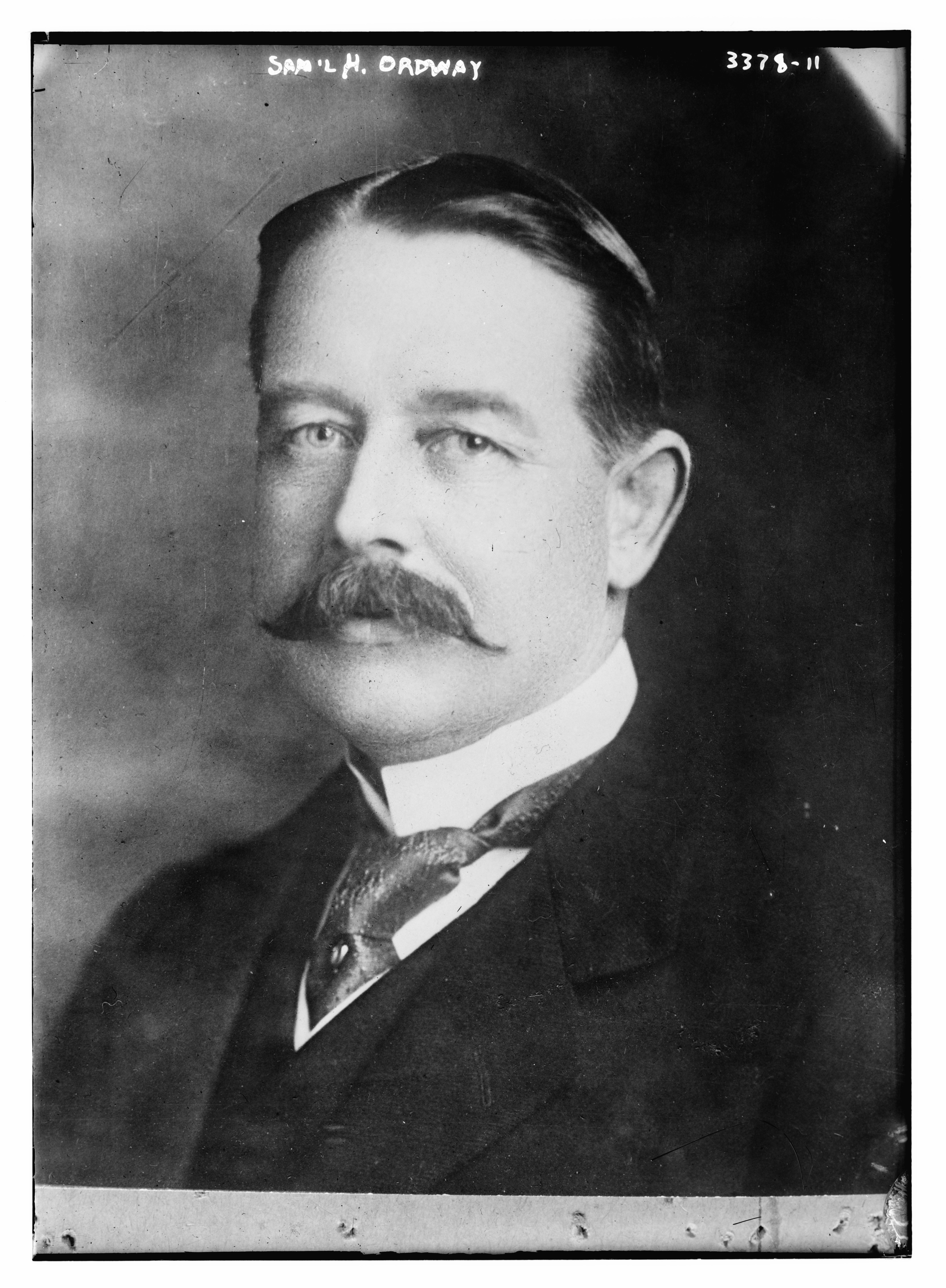
- Ordway c. 1910
- Born: Samuel Hanson Ordway; June 8, 1860; Manhattan, New York, U.S.
- Died: April 19, 1934 (aged 73); Manhattan, New York, U.S.
- Resting place: Woodlawn Cemetery, Bronx, New York, U.S.
- Spouse: Frances Hunt Throop
- Children: 2, including Samuel H. Ordway Jr.
- Relatives: Lucius Pond Ordway (brother); John P. Ordway (paternal uncle)

Samuel Hanson Ordway (born New York City, New York, June 8, 1860; died New York City, New York, April 19, 1934) was an American lawyer, judge, public servant, and advocate of civil service reform. He served briefly as a judge of the New York Supreme Court's First Judicial District during 1917.

== Early life ==
Ordway's parents were Aaron Lucius Ordway (1822-1903) and Frances Ellen Hanson (1831-1873). The Ordways were from Essex County, Massachusetts, but his father, a coal and iron dealer and sales agent, spent periods of time in New York City on business. Ordway's younger brother Lucius Pond Ordway (1862-1948) went west to St. Paul, Minnesota and became a wealthy businessman; he was an early backer and president of 3M. John Pond Ordway (1824-1880), their uncle, was a successful song composer and music publisher in Boston (Jingle Bells is dedicated to him). By the early 1880s Ordway's father had become an executive for the wealthy Sayles family of Rhode Island, managing their Interlaken Mills textile business.

Ordway attended the University Grammar School in Providence, Rhode Island and Brown University, graduating in 1880. He went on to Harvard University, receiving an MA and LL.B. in 1883. In 1884 he was admitted to the bar in New York City. He was a partner in Stickney, Spencer, and Ordway 1890-1903 and Spencer, Ordway, and Wierum after 1903.

== Career in public service ==
In 1901 he served as assistant district attorney. In 1906 he was a member of a state commission to revise tax laws, and he was an unsuccessful Republican candidate for the New York Supreme Court, 1st Judicial District. In 1908 he was appointed by governor Charles Evans Hughes as a commissioner to investigate corruption accusations against Queens borough president Joseph Bermel, who fled to Europe. In 1909 he served on another state commission, this one to investigate stock speculation. In 1910 Ordway was called on by Governor Hughes to investigate Bermel's successor as Queens borough president, Lawrence Gresser, and his investigation led to Gresser's removal in 1911 by Hughes' successor, John A. Dix. Ordway was president of the Brown University alumni association 1910-1 and became a trustee in 1913. From 1915 to 1917 he was president of the New York State Civil Service Commission, resigning in 1917 to take an appointment to an empty seat on the New York Supreme Court, 1st Judicial District, serving for the rest of that year. He was also a member of New York City's Selective Service Board during World War I. In 1918 he was appointed Public Service Commissioner for the First District (New York City). He continued to work as a lawyer and serve as president of the New York Civil Service Reform Association.

== Family ==
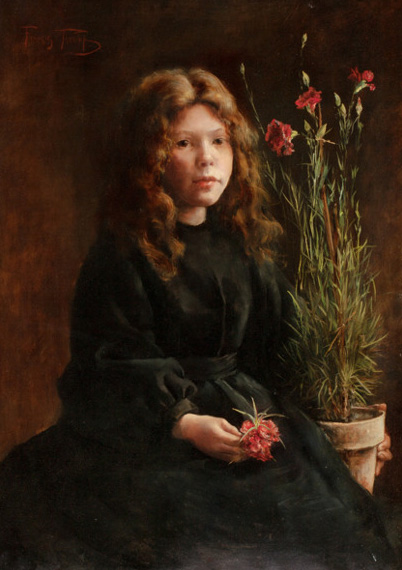
Spring Carnations, by Ordway's wife Frances Hunt Throop, 1893

Ordway married painter Frances Hunt Throop (1860–1933) on May 30, 1894. Her grandfather was George B. Throop, a New York state senator and later Michigan state representative; her great-uncle Enos T. Throop was the governor of New York from 1829 to 1832.

Samuel Ordway and Frances Throop Ordway had two children, Frances Hanson Ordway (1898–1903) and Samuel H. Ordway Jr. (1900–1971). Samuel Jr. was himself an advocate of civil service reform, serving on civil service commissions on both the state and federal levels. He was also active in conservation; the Samuel H. Ordway, Jr. Memorial Preserve in South Dakota was created in 1975 in his memory by The Nature Conservancy.
