= Joseph Bermel =

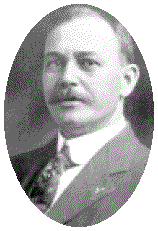

Borough President of Queens
- In office 1906–1908
- Preceded by: Joseph Cassidy
- Succeeded by: Lawrence Gresser

Personal details
- Born: April 8, 1860; Brooklyn, New York, U.S.
- Died: July 28, 1921 (aged 61); Carlsbad, Czechoslovakia

Joseph Bermel (April 8, 1860 – July 28, 1921) was a Democratic politician who served as borough president of Queens, New York City, from 1906 to 1908. He is best known for resigning from the post of borough president for his involvement in a corruption scandal, upon which he fled the country in 1908.

Bermel was born in Brooklyn, but by 1882 he had moved to Middle Village in Queens and established a stone cutting business, making cemetery monuments. He quickly became involved in politics, and in the 1890s was town supervisor in Newtown. When Queens consolidated with New York City in 1898, Bermel pursued appointments at the borough level. He became an ally of early machine politician Joseph Cassidy and served as his Commissioner of Public Works when Cassidy was elected Borough President.

In 1905, Cassidy was seeking a third term as Borough President, but Bermel had his own plans for the office. He announced his own candidacy, running on a fusion ticket under the Republican and Independence League parties. He beat his former boss and became Borough President in 1906, vowing to fight "graft in every form."

Bermel proved to be almost as effective as Cassidy in wielding political power, and was quickly suspected of corruption. Bermel was largely responsible for the city's purchase of land for the creation of Kissena Park in Flushing. The city paid much more than fair market value for the property, which was held by friends of Bermel. A grand jury investigation ensued, and Governor Charles Evans Hughes appointed civil service reformer Samuel H. Ordway to investigate on April 28, 1908.

Bermel was scheduled to give testimony in the case on May 1, but he resigned as borough president on April 30. It was rumored that he was planning to flee the country the following day on the ocean liner Slavonia, so the district attorney served a subpoena requiring him to testify. He gave testimony in the morning, but was given permission to leave upon his promise to return by 2 o'clock that afternoon at the courthouse in Long Island City. By 12:02 pm, an hour after he promised to return, he was at the docks boarding the ship and heading for Rome. In his parting statement to the press, he said "I have nothing to say except to leave good luck for my friends and enemies alike."

On August 4, 1908, just three months after he fled to Europe, Bermel returned to New York. The Queens County District Attorney declared that "nothing of a criminal nature was pending" against Bermel. Bermel never faced charges stemming from his time in office. He died in Carlsbad, Czechoslovakia in 1921.

Political offices
Preceded by Joseph Cassidy	Borough President of Queens; 1906–1908	Succeeded by Lawrence Gresser
