= Shen Bochen =

Chinese comics artist (1889–1920)

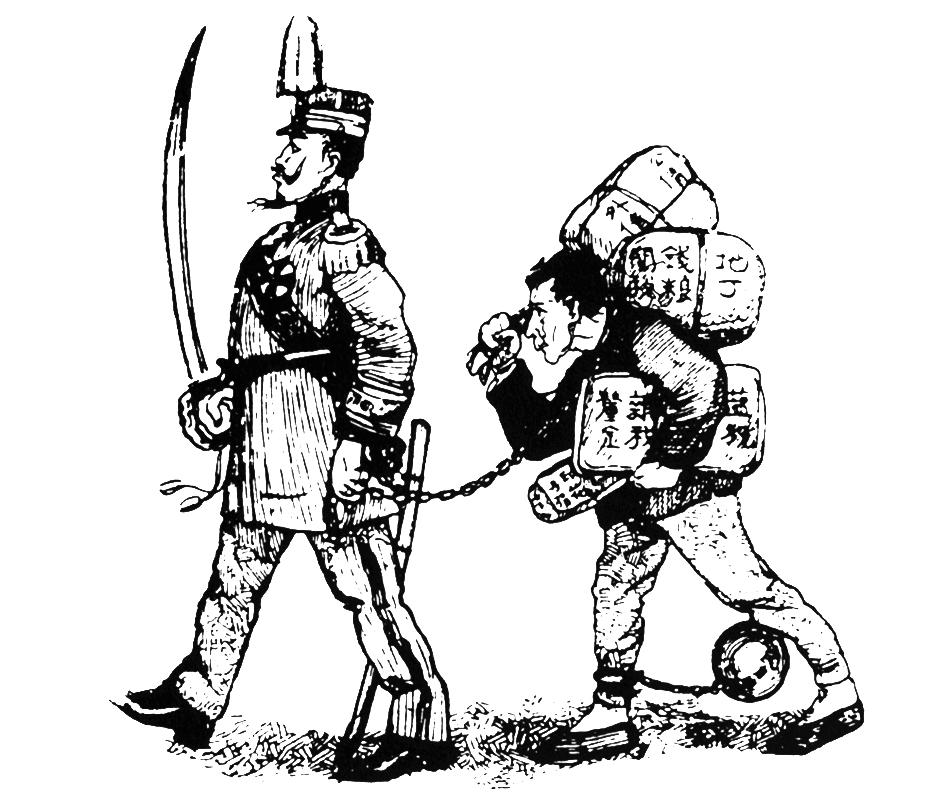
"Who said that Chinese citizens can enjoy freedom and happiness?" - cartoon by Shen Bochen at Shanghai Puck, 1918.

Shen Bochen (沈泊塵; 1889 — 1920) was a pioneering Chinese cartoonist. He drew political cartoons for newspapers and magazines during the Republican Era, depicting events such as the May Fourth Movement. Shen founded the satirical magazine Shanghai Puck.

== Biography ==
Shen Bochen was born in Wuzhen, Tongxiang, in Zhejiang province. After his father's early death, he and his three siblings were raised by an uncle. His uncle sent him to work in a fabric shop in Shanghai; during his stay, he also drew pictures of modern women for the Great Republic Pictorial (大共和画报). He practiced his skills inspired by the works of Wu Youru. At the age of 20 he studied traditional painting under Qian Hui'an and in 1915 under Pan Zhenyong, two representatives of the Shanghai School.

Shen's skills improved and he went drew portraits of Chinese opera stars, portraits of women and cartoons for several magazines, such as Shenbao, Shenzhou huabao, Minquan huabao, Dagonghe ribao, and Shishi xinbao. Shen's style was influenced by Western-style works and were drawn by pen in a distinct black-and-white style.

In 1918 he founded the bilingual (Chinese and English) magazine Shanghai Puck (上海潑克), also called Bochen huaji huabao (泊尘滑稽报; Bochen's comic pictorial) where he contributed with cartoons about current affairs. Four issues were published before his death. Shen used his cartoons to criticize the warlord government and depict upheavel and social ills during the early Republic of China period.
