= Katharine Ordway =

American philanthropist

Katharine Ordway (April 3, 1899 – 1979) was an American philanthropist who used her wealth for land preservation, including protecting the prairies of the Great Plains.

== Biography ==
Katharine was born on April 3, 1899, to Lucius Pond Ordway and Jessie Cornwell Gilman. Her father, Lucius, worked his way up to president of a plumbing and heating company, before buying a majority stake in Minnesota Mining and Manufacturing.

Katharine grew up in Saint Paul, Minnesota, and saw the tallgrass prairie in the region almost completely disappear by 1930. She graduated cum laude from the University of Minnesota with degrees in botany and art, then briefly attended the Yale School of Medicine. Later, she studied biology and land-use planning at Columbia University.

Lucius died in 1948, leaving his children an estate worth $18.8 million. Katharine used her inherited wealth for natural area conservation, second only to John D. Rockefeller Jr. Her philanthropy helped protect 31,000 acres of Great Plains prairies, including helping The Nature Conservancy purchase the Konza Prairie Biological Station, and the Katharine Ordway Natural History Study Area, a 278-acre parcel consisting of dry prairie, oak woodland-brushland, mesic prairie, and black ash swamp. She donated the Lucius Pond Ordway Devil's Den Preserve to the Nature Conservancy. She donated Prairie State Park to Missouri.

== Legacy ==
She endowed an Acquisition Fund for the Yale University Art Gallery. The University of Florida named The Katharine Ordway Chair in Ecosystem Conservation for her.
