= Hong Yi =

Chinese artist and Buddhist teacher

Great Master Hong Yi (Hong-it)
- 弘一（法師） 演音
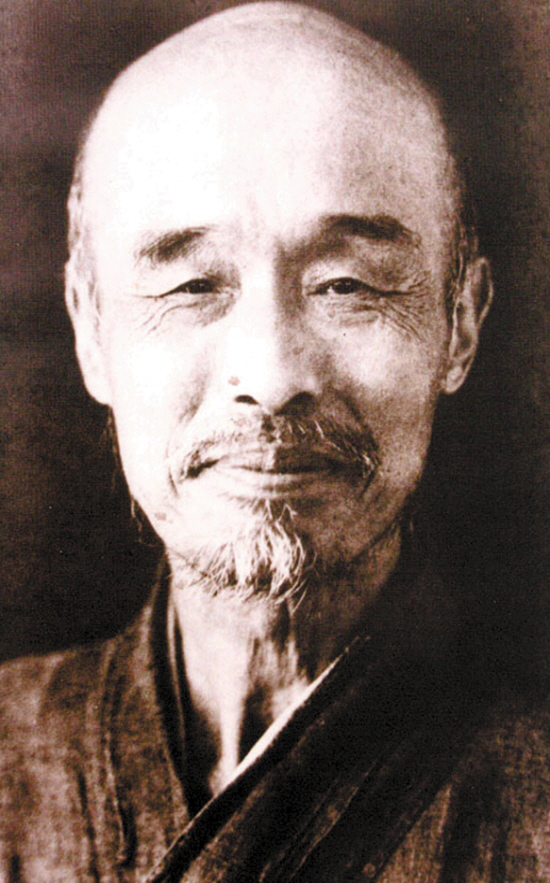
- Hong in 1937

Personal life
- Born: Li Shutong (李叔同) (李漱筒); October 23, 1880 Tianjin, Qing China
- Died: October 13, 1942 (aged 61) Quanzhou, Fujian, Republic of China
- Spouse: Yu Shi; Yezi
- Children: 3
- Parent(s): Li Shizhen (李世珍)
- Notable work(s): Maiden; Camellia; Self-Portrait; Songbie (song)
- Education: Furen Academy; Nanyang Public School; Tokyo University of the Arts

Religious life
- Religion: Buddhism
- Temple: Kaiyuan Temple
- School: Nanshan Vinaya
- Lineage: 11th generation

Senior posting
- Teacher: Liaowu; Master Yinguang
- Students: Feng Zikai Liu Zhiping

Hong Yi (23 October 1880 – 13 October 1942; Chinese: 弘一; pinyin: Hóngyī; Pe̍h-ōe-jī: Hông-it, also romanized Hong-it), or Yan Yin (Chinese: 演音; pinyin: Yǎnyīn; Pe̍h-ōe-jī: Ián-im) was a Chinese Buddhist monk of the Nanshan Vinaya school. He was also an artist, and a musician. Born Li Shutong (李叔同 and 李漱筒), he was known by the names Wen Tao, Guang Hou, and Shu Tong, but was most commonly known by his Buddhist name, Hong Yi (Hokkien Hong-it).

Master Hongyi was a highly influential figure in both the modern Chinese cultural movement and the Buddhist revival during the Republic of China period. Initially renowned for his diverse artistic talents in poetry, music, painting, and calligraphy, he underwent a significant transformation, ordaining as a Buddhist monk in 1918 at Hupao Temple in Hangzhou. From that point until his death in 1942, he dedicated his life to the study and dissemination of Chinese Buddhism. He is widely recognized as one of the four eminent monks of the Republic of China, alongside Masters Taixu, Yinguang, and Xuyun. Within the Chinese Buddhist tradition, Master Hongyi is primarily known and respected as the eleventh patriarch of the Nanshan Vinaya school, a title reflecting his critical role in revitalizing the Vinaya tradition in modern China.

== Life ==
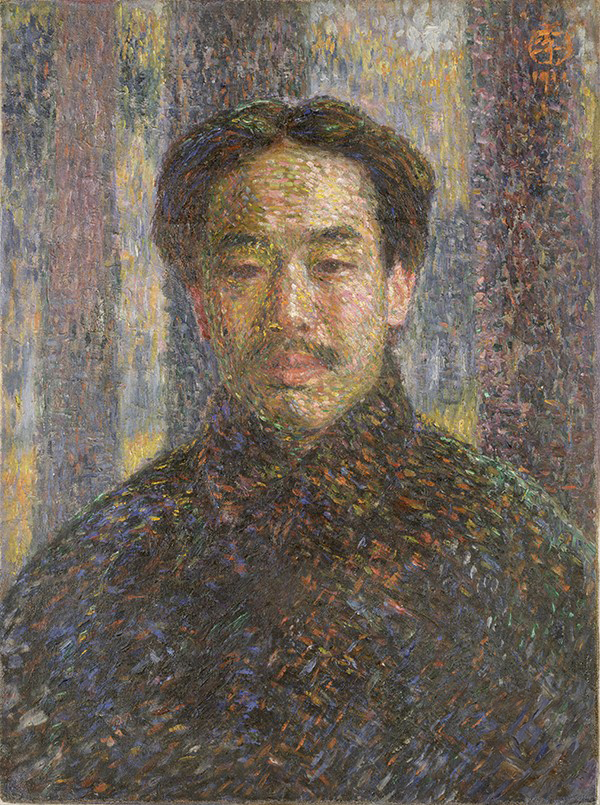
Li Shutong (Hong Yi)

=== Lay life ===
He was born as Li Shutong in Tianjin to a banking family originating in Hongtong County, Shanxi, that migrated to Tianjin in the Ming Dynasty, though his mother was from Pinghu, Zhejiang province.

In 1898 Li moved to Shanghai and joined the "Shanghai Painting and Calligraphy Association", and the "Shanghai Scholarly Society" while he was attending the Nanyang Public School (later became Jiaotong University). In 1905 Li went to Japan to study at Tokyo School of Fine Art in Ueno Park where he specialized in Western painting and music, and met a lover by the name of Yukiko who was to become his concubine.

In 1910 Li returned to China and was appointed to Tianjin's Beiyang Advanced Industry School. The next year he was appointed as a music teacher in a girls' school in Shanghai. He went to Hangzhou in 1912 and became a lecturer in the Zhejiang Secondary Normal College (now Hangzhou Normal University). He taught not only Western painting and music but also art history. By 1915 Jiang Qian hired him as a teacher at Nanjing Higher Normal School (renamed in 1949 to Nanjing University), where he taught painting and music. He also taught at Zhejiang Secondary Normal School (浙江兩級師範學堂), the predecessor of the famous Hangzhou High School.

During these later years, Li's reputation grew, as he became the first Chinese educator to use nude models in his painting classes, not to mention as the first teacher of Western music in China. Some of the students, like Singapore artist Chen Wen Hsi (陳文希) whom he personally groomed, went on to become accomplished masters of the arts in their later days. Li Shutong himself was also an accomplished composer and lyricist. Many of his compositions are still remembered and performed today.

In 1916 Li became a Buddhist. After spending another year in spiritual retreat, Li chose to be ordained as a monk, and thus began a holistic life dedicated to propagating Buddhism and its code of conduct. After becoming a monk the only visual art he practised was calligraphy, developing a simple and unadorned, yet unique style, which was treasured by everyone who received a sample. He became known to all as Master Hong Yi. In 1942, Master Hong Yi died peacefully at the age of 61 in Quanzhou, Fujian Province. Li is one of the three great poetic monks in the late Qing Dynasty (others are Su Manshu, Shi Jingan).

=== Monastic life ===
In 1918, Li Shutong received ordination to become a Buddhist monk at Hupao Temple in Hangzhou. From this point, his life entered the second stage, that of Master Hongyi. He is known as the eleventh patriarch of the Vinaya school of Chinese Buddhism. This title was first publicly used by Feng Zikai in 1947, although initially, there was some controversy within the Buddhist community regarding his inclusion in the lineage. His recognition as the eleventh patriarch came through a long process and reflects his great contributions to the study of Vinaya.

He initially considered focusing on the Sarvāstivādin Vinaya, even using its explanations to correct Nanshan viewpoints in early drafts of his work. However, he made a vow in 1931 to abandon the Sarvāstivādin and specialize solely in Nanshan Vinaya, pledging to promote it and establish the Nanshan Vinaya Academy. He chose Nanshan Vinaya because the Four-division Vinaya had been the foundation of Chinese Buddhist Vinaya since the Tang dynasty and was well-suited for being explained based on Mahayana teachings. He dedicated himself to this mission by studying, teaching, and compiling works on Nanshan Vinaya. His contributions included compiling, editing, annotating, and revising key Vinaya scriptures and commentaries. He tirelessly lectured on Vinaya throughout China and established Vinaya-focused educational centers like the Yangzheng Institute. Master Hongyi strongly believed that keeping precepts was the correct path for Buddhists and emphasized disciplining oneself. He practiced the Vinaya strictly and served as an exemplary model for others. He also promoted precepts for lay Buddhists, compiling works like Nanshanlü zaijia beilan.

Master Hongyi was also committed to monastic education. He believed that Buddhist precepts were the lifeline for the Sangha and made cultivating discipline the primary purpose of his educational efforts, including establishing Vinaya schools and institutes. He emphasized both the study of theory and the practice of precepts. He also integrated art with Buddhist teachings, believing that artistic excellence was rooted in Buddhist study. He also engaged with social issues, such as caring for lives and protecting the country. He was a patriot from a young age and expressed a willingness to become a martyr during the war. He also actively countered movements to "exterminate Buddhism," arguing for the rectification of the Sangha but opposing its abolition.

Master Hongyi died in Wenling Nursing Home in Quanzhou, Fujian Province, on October 13, 1942. At the time of his death, he was already regarded as a Vinaya patriarch.

== Teachings ==
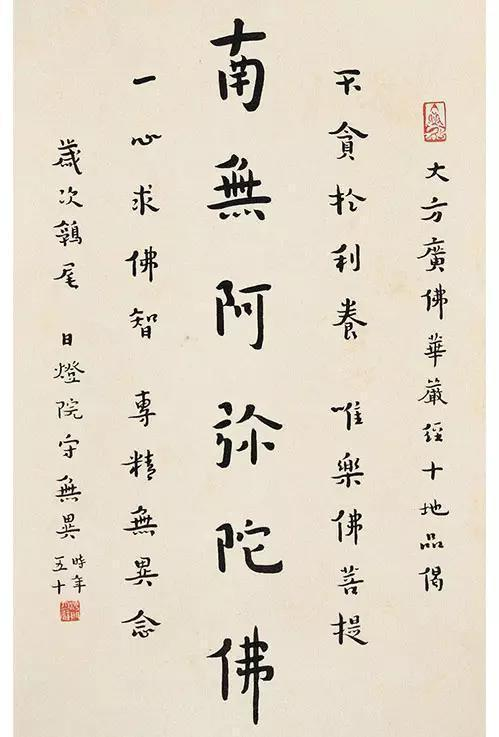
Calligraphy of the nianfo and two gathas, by Master Hongyi

Master Hongyi's Buddhist legacy is characterized by his deep engagement with three major schools of Chinese Buddhism: Vinaya, Pure Land, and Huayan. While he is most associated with the revival of the Vinaya school, his integration and advocacy of Pure Land and Huayan practices were also central to his teachings. Master Hongyi's approach to Buddhist thought and practice is often summarized by the principle: "to uphold Huayan for the state of mind, to uphold the Four-Division Vinaya for practice, and to see Pure Land as the result".

=== Vinaya ===
Master Hongyi devoted the most time and effort to the study and promotion of the Nanshan Vinaya school. He viewed the revival of Nanshan Vinaya as his primary mission. His efforts included the collation, editing, annotation, and revision of key Vinaya scriptures and commentaries, providing essential textual resources for future generations of practitioners and scholars. Initially, Master Hongyi had an interest in the Sarvāstivādin Vinaya, even quoting its explanations to correct Nanshan viewpoints in early drafts of his work. However, influenced partly by the lay Buddhist Xu Weiru and recognizing the historical foundation and suitability of the Four-Division Vinaya within Chinese Mahayana Buddhism, he made a vow in 1931 to specialize solely in the Nanshan Vinaya and promote it. He saw the Four-Division Vinaya as well-suited to the capabilities of Chinese monastics and capable of being explained based on Mahayana teachings.

He tirelessly lectured on Vinaya doctrines across various monasteries and educational institutions throughout China, from Qingdao in the north to Xiamen in the south. He also played a crucial role in establishing Vinaya-focused educational centers, such as the Nanshan Vinaya Academy and the Buddhist Yangzheng Institute, to cultivate future monastics in Vinaya studies. Master Hongyi strongly insisted that keeping precepts was the correct path for Buddhists. He not only taught Vinaya but also embodied its principles through his strict and exemplary personal practice, earning deep respect from his contemporaries and later generations. He believed that practitioners should focus on disciplining themselves, not others. His contributions extended to the promotion of precepts for lay Buddhists through works like Nanshan Vinaya for the Laity. His significant efforts and scholarly achievements in the Vinaya tradition led to his recognition as the eleventh patriarch of the Nanshan Vinaya sect, a title that solidified his prominent status despite some initial controversies regarding the lineage transmission.

=== Pure Land ===
Master Hongyi viewed the Pure Land practice of reciting the Buddha's name as the "result" or "fruit" of one's spiritual cultivation. He strongly advocated for the Pure Land method, considering it the most suitable and accessible path for sentient beings in the Degenerate Age of Dharma and for the needs of the time. He gave Pure Land teachings a high doctrinal standing, classifying them as a "One Vehicle Perfect Teaching" (the highest class of teaching in Huayan and Tiantai hermeneutics). Master Hongyi's promotion of Pure Land was extensive, including writing prefaces and postscripts for Pure Land texts, giving lectures, and using calligraphy to propagate the name of Amitabha Buddha. His teachings emphasized the importance of deep belief in the law of cause and effect, generating Bodhicitta (the aspiration for enlightenment for the benefit of all beings), and concentrating on Buddha recitation. He also recommended supplementing Pure Land practice with texts such as the Sutra of Kṣitigarbha's Fundamental Vows and the Chapter on Practices and Vows of the Bodhisattva Samantabhadra. He held Master Yinguang, a prominent Pure Land master, in high esteem. A notable contribution to Pure Land practice was his focus on hospice care centered around Buddha recitation, aiming to provide support and alleviate fear for those nearing the end of life.

Although predominantly recognized as a Vinaya master and the eleventh patriarch of the Nanshan school, Master Hongyi held significant importance for Pure Land Buddhism in modern China. His advocacy lent considerable weight and popularity to the practice, especially among the educated class, due to his own esteemed background. His approach of integrating Pure Land practice with the theoretical framework of Huayan and supplementary readings like the Kṣitigarbha Sutra broadened the scope and understanding of Pure Land cultivation. Furthermore, his practical emphasis on Buddha recitation during hospice care provided a concrete application of Pure Land principles to address the fears surrounding death. His personal example of diligent practice and widespread promotion contributed significantly to the enduring prevalence and influence of Pure Land Buddhism in contemporary China.

=== Huayan ===
Master Hongyi considered Huayan as the theoretical foundation or "realm" for his Buddhist thought and practice. He studied the Huayan Sutra extensively and viewed it highly, classifying it as a "Perfect Teaching" within Mahayana Buddhism and referring to it as the "Ocean of Doctrines". He was familiar with the works of previous Huayan patriarchs and recommended them to others. However, his approach to promoting Huayan differed from traditional Huayan masters. Instead of focusing heavily on its complex philosophical doctrines, he emphasized its integration with Pure Land practice, particularly through the recitation of the Chapter on Practices and Vows of the Bodhisattva Samantabhadra (Puxian Xingyuan Pin). He saw this chapter, included in the broader Huayan Sutra, as a means to accumulate merit and facilitate rebirth in the Pure Land. He promoted Huayan through compilation, transcription, lectures, and gifting copies of related texts.

== Commemorations and exhibitions ==
Beijing-based progressive-metal rock band the Tang Dynasty recorded a rock-version of Master Hong Yi's famous romantic ballad, the Farewell song in their second album Epic.

A special 130th anniversary celebration of Master Hong Yi showcasing his calligraphy and painting works took place in 2010 in Shanghai, partly sponsored by the Pinghu Municipal Government, and attended by a granddaughter of Hong Yi.

== Important works ==
Publications

- The Chart of the Dharmaguptaka Vinaya Bhikkhu Precepts
- The Guide to the Nanshan Vinaya for Lay Buddhists (Chinese: 南山律在家備覽)

Collections

- Happy Stones
- Li Shutong's Seals

Articles

- How to Paint (Chinese: 圖畫修得法)
- An Introduction to Watercolors (Chinese: 水彩畫法說略)

Lyrics

- Song: Song Bie Ge (Farewell Song) (Chinese: 送别歌)

Music

- Song: Childhood memories (Chinese: 憶兒時)
- Song: Song of Spring Sightseeing (Chinese: 春游曲)
- Song: Song of Three Jewels (Buddhist Refuge), Taixu lyrics (Chinese: zh:三寶歌)

== See also ==
- Feng Zikai
- Huineng
- Yemek Sanatı (Turkish)
