= Lucius Pond Ordway =

American businessman (1862–1948)

Lucius Ordway
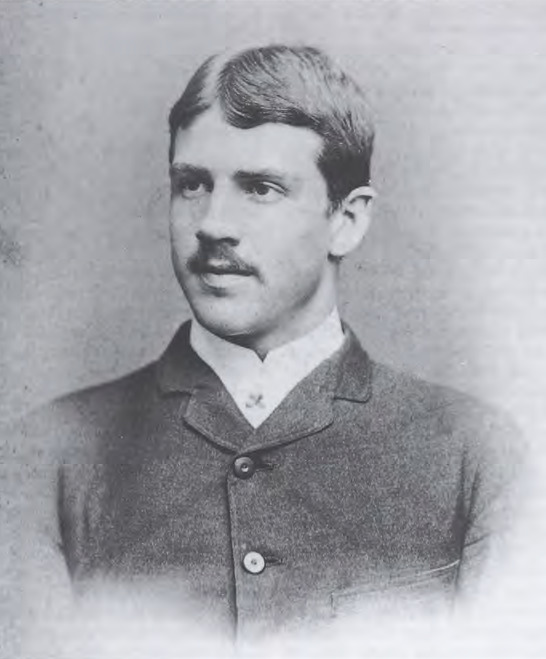
- Ordway c. 1883
- Born: January 21, 1862; Brooklyn, New York, U.S.
- Died: January 10, 1948 (aged 85); Palm Beach, Florida, U.S.
- Resting place: Oakland Cemetery, Saint Paul, Minnesota
- Spouse: Jesse Cornwell Gilman
- Children: 5, including Katharine Ordway
- Relatives: Samuel H. Ordway (brother); John Pond Ordway (paternal uncle); John M. Gilman (father-in-law)

Lucius Pond Ordway (January 21, 1862 – January 10, 1948) was an American businessman and investor prominent in St. Paul, Minnesota whose investments and leadership helped create the modern 3M corporation.

== Early life ==
Ordway was the son of Aaron Lucius Ordway (1822-1903), a businessman from a family long settled in and near Essex County, Massachusetts, and Frances Ellen Hanson (1831-1873). His father was a coal and iron dealer and salesman during Ordway's childhood, but by 1883 had become a business executive for the wealthy Sayles family of Rhode Island. His uncle John Pond Ordway (1824-1880) was a well-known businessman, composer, music publisher, and physician of the Civil War era. ("Pond" was the maiden name of their grandmother, Catherine Pond Ordway (1787-1851).) His brother Samuel Hanson Ordway (1860-1934) graduated from Brown University and Harvard Law School and became a prominent New York City lawyer and civil service reformer; he married painter Frances Hunt Throop in 1894. Lucius was born Brooklyn, New York; graduated from Brown in 1883 and went west to St. Paul, Minnesota to find work. He became a salesman for the firm of Wilson and Rogers, which sold tools and plumbing supplies.

== Business career ==
By 1892 he had become a partner in the firm and then bought out his remaining partner, Charles Rogers. In 1893 he merged the firm with some of the Minneapolis manufacturing interests of Richard Teller Crane to create Crane & Ordway. By 1897 they were the leading manufacturer of steam engine parts in the region.

Ordway had become a wealthy man and he made several outside investments. In 1908 he bought property in St. Paul and constructed The Saint Paul Hotel, opened with much fanfare in 1910. But his most significant investment was the money that he put into the infant and seemingly ill-fated Minnesota Mining and Manufacturing Company, now known as 3M. From 1904 to 1906 Ordway sunk more than $200,000 in the floundering enterprise and then became the company president from 1906 to 1910. In 1910 he moved the company's headquarters to St. Paul and built a new sandpaper plant there where he could watch over his investment. The company started to turn a profit during World War I and Ordway's share of the company became the source of a considerable family fortune. By the 1930s Ordway owned a villa in Palm Beach, Florida, designed by fashionable architect Maurice Fatio.

During World War I Ordway served on the Priorities Commission of the War Industries Board.

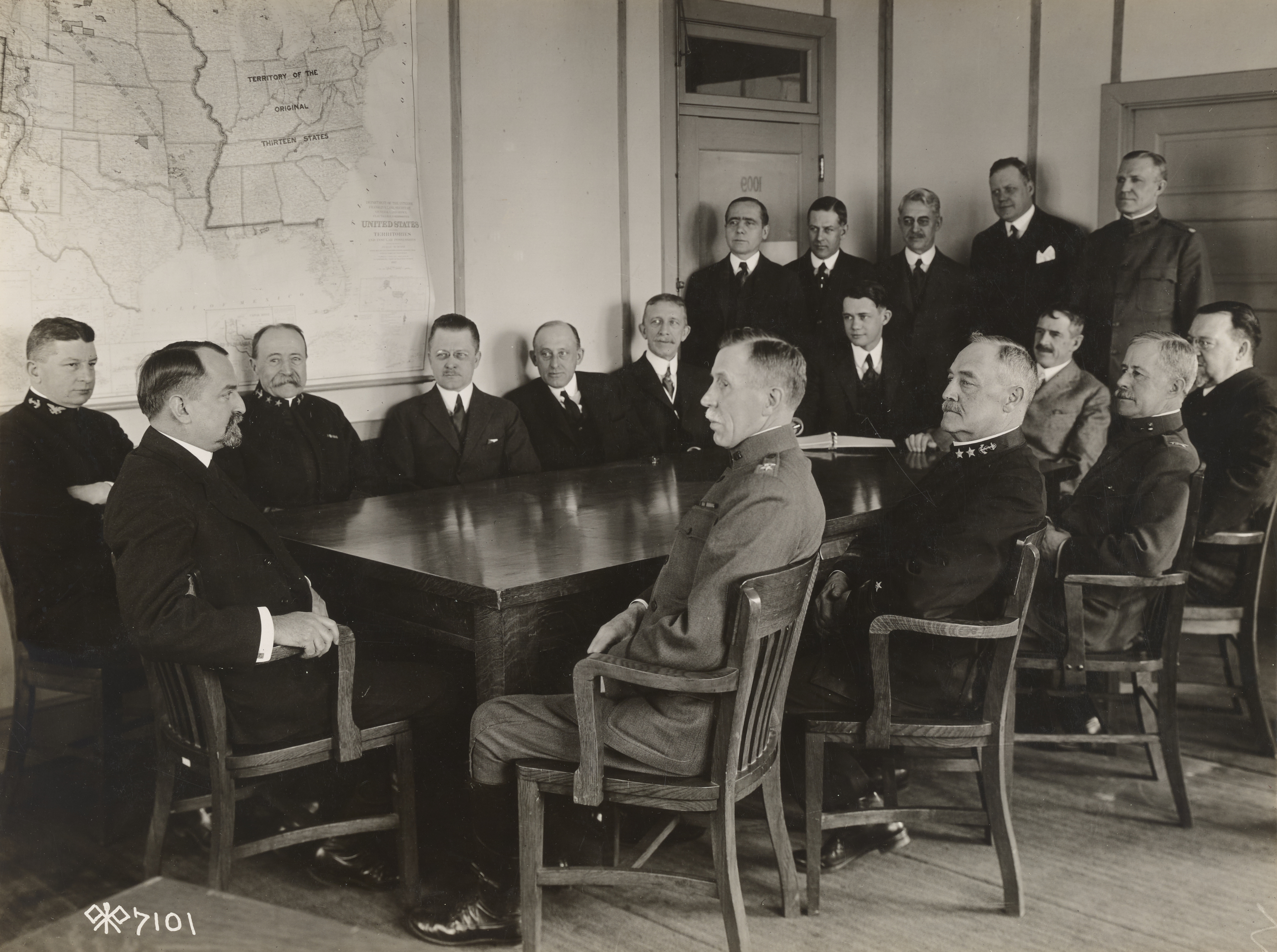
The Priorities Commission of the War Industries Board, 1918; Ordway is seated at the far end of the table in a gray suit

== Private life and family ==
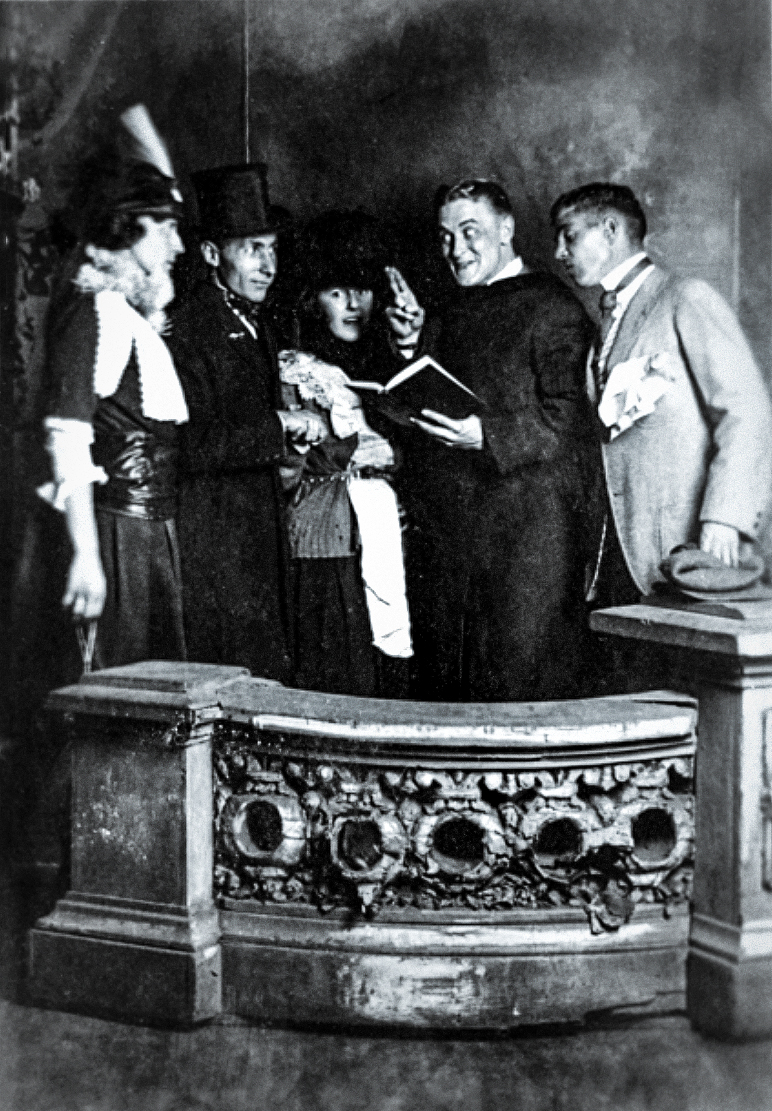
His son Lucius Jr. (far right) standing next to family friend F. Scott Fitzgerald

Ordway married Jesse Cornwell Gilman (1864-1944) on April 29, 1885; she was the daughter of John M. Gilman, a prominent St. Paul lawyer and Democratic politician. They had five children: John Gilman Ordway (1886-1966), Samuel Gilman Ordway (1887-1942), Lucius Pond Ordway Jr. (1890-1964), Katharine Ordway (1899-1979), and Richard Ordway (1903-1976). Lucius Jr., a stockbroker, owned the West Palm Beach Indians minor league baseball team at one point; the Ordway Building, part of a cluster of buildings at Florida Southern College designed by Frank Lloyd Wright, is named in his honor. Katherine Ordway studied botany and late in her life gave millions of dollars to purchase and preserve undeveloped land, principally Midwestern prairies. The Ordway family were friends with F. Scott Fitzgerald.

The Ordways' first home, at 257 Summit Avenue in St. Paul, was designed by architect Cass Gilbert, a personal friend of Lucius'.

Lucius Ordway himself was an avid sailor, being one of the founders and the first commodore of the White Bear Yacht Club. He owned a Gus Amundson 20-foot boat named "Mahto" with which he won that division in the 1898 Inland Lake Yachting Association Regatta. He purchased another Gus Amundson boat, the "Minnesota", and raced it unsuccessfully in the 1900 race for the Seewanhaka Cup. In 1904 he again raced in the Seewanhaka Cup race, this time with a boat named "White Bear" designed by Bowdoin B. Crowninshield, leading for much of the race.

Ordway died at his son Lucius Jr.'s home in Palm Beach, Florida, on January 10, 1948.

== Legacy ==
The Ordway Center for the Performing Arts in St. Paul was built largely with Ordway family money and was named in his honor. Katherine Ordway gave money for The Nature Conservancy's Lucius Pond Ordway Devil's Den Preserve in Connecticut and named it for her father.
