= Maurice E. Connolly =

American politician

Maurice Edward Connolly
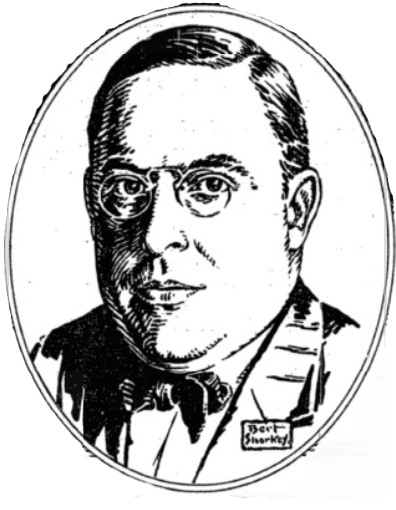
- The New York Times, February 26, 1928

Borough President of Queens
- In office 1911–1928
- Preceded by: Lawrence Gresser
- Succeeded by: Bernard M. Patten

Personal details
- Born: June 22, 1880 Corona, New York, United States
- Died: November 24, 1935 (aged 55) Forest Hills Gardens, New York, United States

Maurice Edward Connolly (June 22, 1880 – November 24, 1935) was the borough president of Queens, New York City, from 1911 to 1928.

== Biography ==
Born in Corona, Queens, New York, he was the son of Maurice Connolly and Mary Jane Connolly. He was of Irish ancestry. He married Helen M. Connell and they had one child, Helen. He was a Democrat. Trained as a lawyer at Columbia Law School, he was elected borough president of Queens in 1911, serving until his resignation in 1928. He was a delegate to the Democratic National Convention from New York, 1912, 1916, and 1924.

His resignation as borough president in April 1928 occurred during an investigation of a sewer graft scandal. In his criminal trial he was represented by attorney Max Steuer. In October 1928 he was convicted of conspiracy to defraud the city, and was sentenced to one year in prison and fined $500. Following an unsuccessful appeal, he served the prison sentence in 1930–31.

He died from a cerebral hemorrhage, in Forest Hills Gardens, Queens, New York on November 24, 1935. His body was interred at Mount St. Mary's Cemetery in Flushing, Queens, New York.

Political offices
Preceded by Lawrence Gresser	Borough President of Queens; 1911–1928	Succeeded by Bernard M. Patten
