= Ordway Center for the Performing Arts =

Performing arts center in Saint Paul, Minnesota, U.S.

- Ordway Music Theater (1985–2000)
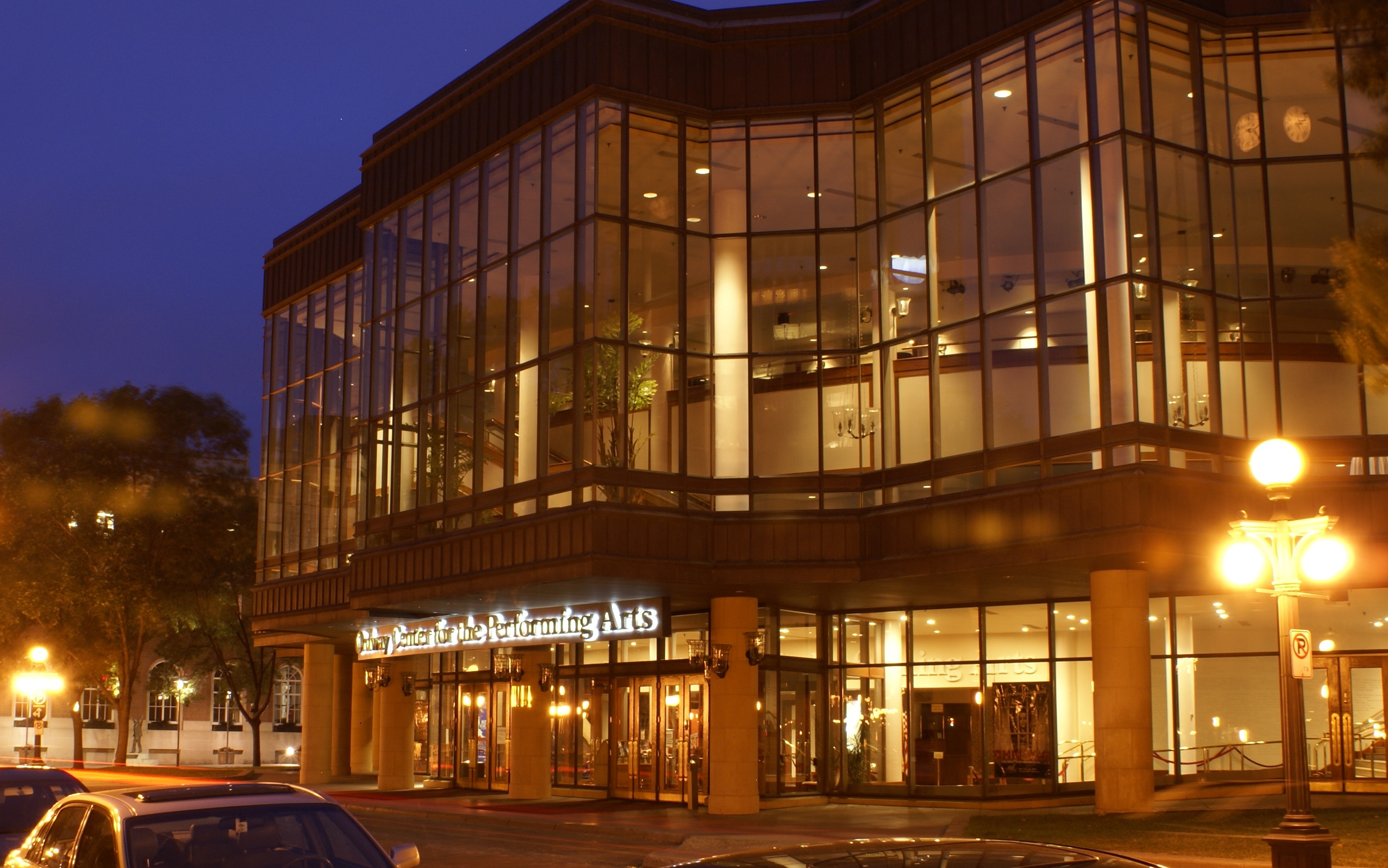
- Interactive map of Ordway Center for the Performing Arts
- Address: 345 Washington Street; Saint Paul, Minnesota 55102; United States
- Coordinates: 44°56′41″N 93°05′54″W
- Capacity: Music Theater: 1,900; Concert Hall: 1,093

Construction
- Opened: January 1, 1985
- Architect: Benjamin C. Thompson

Website
- ordway.org

The Ordway Center for the Performing Arts, in downtown Saint Paul, Minnesota, United States, hosts a variety of performing arts, such as touring Broadway musicals, orchestra, opera, and cultural performers, and produces local musicals. It is home to several local arts organizations, including the Minnesota Opera, The Saint Paul Chamber Orchestra, and The Schubert Club. The president and CEO, Christopher Harrington, has served since November 2021.

== History ==
In 1980, Saint Paul resident Sally Ordway Irvine (a 3M heiress and arts patron) dreamed of a European-style concert hall offering "everything from opera to the Russian circus". She contributed $7.5 million—a sum matched by other members of the Ordway family—toward the facility's cost. Fifteen Twin Cities corporations and foundations were the principal funders of the $46 million complex, the most expensive privately funded arts facility ever built in the state. Saint Paul native Benjamin Thompson, whose other projects included the Faneuil Hall renovation in Boston and South Street Seaport in New York, was selected to design a building that would project "a visible contemporary image" but also harmoniously fit on a site facing Rice Park, a block-square park framed by historic buildings. As designed by Thompson, Ordway Center (originally named Ordway Music Theatre) contained a 1,900-seat Music Theater; an intimate McKnight Theatre (306 seats); two large rehearsal rooms; and the Marzitelli Foyer, a spacious two-story lobby with a glass curtain-wall through which theatergoers enjoy a sweeping panorama of Rice Park, its surrounding buildings, and, in the distance, the Mississippi River. The McKnight Theatre was demolished in 2013 to make room for the new 1,093-seat Concert Hall, which opened on February 28, 2015.

The Ordway opened to the public on January 1, 1985, as Ordway Music Theatre. The name was changed in 2000 to reflect the array of performing arts that take place under its roof.

Ordway Center for the Performing Arts serves 400,000 people annually with nearly 500 performances in musical theater, children's theater, world music and dance, orchestra, opera, and recitals.

== About the building ==
The Ordway contains the 1,910-seat Music Theater, the 1,100-seat Concert Hall, two large rehearsal halls, and lobbies on each floor, including the second-floor Marzitelli Foyer, a spacious, two-story lobby encircled by a glass facade.

Architect	Benjamin Thompson and Associates
Contractor	McGough Construction
Building Area	160,000 square feet (15,000 m^{2})
Site Area	90,000 square feet (8,400 m^{2})
Lobby & Grand Foyer Area	38,000 square feet (3,500 m^{2})
Back of House Area	22,000 square feet (2,000 m^{2})
Rehearsal Room Area	4,800 square feet (450 m^{2})

=== Interior ===
Woodwork (public areas)	Honduran mahogany
Original Carpet	Designed by Benjamin Thompson and Associates. 6,000 square yards, manufactured by Mohawk Mills, Greenville, Mississippi
Lobby Tile	Imported from Wales, United Kingdom
Chandeliers	Twelve total: handcrafted chimneys from West Virginia; brass bases from Winona Studio Lighting, Winona, Minnesota
Lobby & Grand Foyer Area	38,000 square feet (3,500 m^{2})

=== Exterior ===
Main Façade	Copper-clad exterior window and fascia system, with more than 500 insulated glass panels.
Brickwork	Handmade brick by Kane Gonic Brickworks of Gonic, New Hampshire. Each brick has variation in color and texture for a rich, handcrafted texture.
Brick pattern	Flemish bond. Pattern: Two “stretchers” laid lengthwise, one “header” laid crosswise.
