= New York City's 31st City Council district =

- Boundaries following the 2020 census

Government
  - Councilmember: . Selvena Brooks-Powers. D–Rockaway Beach

Population (2010)
  - Total: 160,123

Demographics
  - Black: 68%
  - Hispanic: 16%
  - White: 11%
  - Asian: 2%
  - Other: 3%

Registration
  - Democratic: 77.4%
  - Republican: 5.2%
  - No party preference: 14.7%
- Registered voters (2021) 102,579

New York City's 31st City Council district is one of 51 districts in the New York City Council. It has been represented by Democrat Selvena Brooks-Powers since a 2021 special election to succeed fellow Democrat Donovan Richards.

== Geography ==
District 31 covers the farthest southeastern neighborhoods of Queens as well as the eastern section of the Rockaways, including the neighborhoods of Far Rockaway, Laurelton, Rosedale, Arverne, Edgemere, and parts of Springfield Gardens. Rockaway Community Park, Idlewild Park, much of John F. Kennedy International Airport, and some of Jamaica Bay Wildlife Refuge are all located within the district.

The district overlaps with Queens Community Boards 12, 13, and 14, and is contained entirely within New York's 5th congressional district. It also overlaps with the 10th, 14th, and 15th districts of the New York State Senate, and with the 23rd, 29th, 31st, and 32nd districts of the New York State Assembly.

== List of members representing the district ==
| Members | Party | Years served | Electoral history |
|---|---|---|---|
District established January 1, 1974
| Angelo J. Arculeo (Bay Ridge) | Republican | January 1, 1974 – December 31, 1982 | Redistricted from the 22nd district and re-elected in 1973. Re-elected in 1974. Re-elected in 1977. Lost re-election. |
| Sal Albanese (Bay Ridge) | Democratic | January 1, 1983 – December 31, 1991 | Elected in 1982. Re-elected in 1985. Re-elected in 1989. Redistricted to the 43rd district. |
| Juanita E. Watkins (Springfield Gardens) | Democratic | January 1, 1992 – December 31, 1991 | Elected in 1991. Re-elected in 1993. Re-elected in 1997. Termed out. |
| James Sanders Jr. (Far Rockway) | Democratic | January 1, 1992 – December 31, 2012 | Elected in 2001. Re-elected in 2003. Re-elected in 2005. Re-elected in 2009. Termed out and ran for New York State Senate. |
| Donovan Richards (Rosedale) | Democratic | January 1, 2013 – December 2, 2020 | Elected in 2013. Re-elected in 2017. Resigned to become Queens Borough President. |
| Vacant | | December 2, 2020 – March 19, 2021 | |
| Selvena Brooks-Powers (Rockaway Beach) | Democratic | March 19, 2021 – | Elected to finish Richard's term. Re-elected in 2021. Re-elected in 2023. Re-elected in 2025. |

== Recent election results ==
=== 2025 ===
2025 New York City Council election, District 31
| Party | Candidate | Votes | % |
|---|---|---|---|
| Democratic | Selvena Brooks-Powers (incumbent) | 26,211 | 99.0 |
| Write-in | | 254 | 1.0 |
| Total votes | | 26,465 | 100.0 |
| Democratic hold | | | |

=== 2023 (redistricting) ===
Due to redistricting and the 2020 changes to the New York City Charter, councilmembers elected during the 2021 and 2023 City Council elections will serve two-year terms, with full four-year terms resuming after the 2025 New York City Council elections.

2023 New York City Council election, District 31
| Party | Candidate | Votes | % |
|---|---|---|---|
| Democratic | Selvena Brooks-Powers (incumbent) | 8,868 | 89.2 |
| Republican | Daniella May | 972 | |
| Parent Party | Daniella May | 81 | |
| Total | Daniella May | 1,053 | 10.6 |
| Write-in | | 25 | 0.2 |
| Total votes | | 9,946 | 100.0 |
| Democratic hold | | | |

=== 2021 ===
In 2019, voters in New York City approved Ballot Question 1, which implemented ranked-choice voting in all local elections. Under the new system, voters have the option to rank up to five candidates for every local office. Voters whose first-choice candidates fare poorly will have their votes redistributed to other candidates in their ranking until one candidate surpasses the 50 percent threshold. If one candidate surpasses 50 percent in first-choice votes, then ranked-choice tabulations will not occur.

An interactive map of District 31

2021 New York City Council election, District 31
Primary election
| Party | Candidate | Votes | % |
|---|---|---|---|
| Democratic | Selvena Brooks-Powers (incumbent) | 10,807 | 67.4 |
| Democratic | Nancy Martinez | 3,049 | 19.0 |
| Democratic | Nicole Lee | 2,039 | 12.7 |
| Write-in | | 136 | 0.8 |
| Total votes | | 16,031 | 100 |
General election
| Democratic | Selvena Brooks-Powers (incumbent) | 18,070 | 88.9 |
| Republican | Vanessa Simon | 1,902 | |
| Conservative | Vanessa Simon | 324 | |
| Total | Vanessa Simon | 2,226 | 11.0 |
| Write-in | | 27 | 0.1 |
| Total votes | | 20,323 | 100 |
| Democratic hold | | | |

=== 2021 special ===
In 2020, Councilmember Donovan Richards was elected as Queens borough president, triggering a February 2021 special election for his seat. Like most municipal special elections in New York City, the race was officially nonpartisan, with all candidates running on ballot lines of their own creation. It was also the first in the city's history to utilize ranked-choice voting (although an earlier special election in the 24th district was nominally ranked-choice, one candidate won with a majority in the first round).

2021 New York City Council special election, District 31
| Party | Candidate | Maximum round | Maximum votes | Share in maximum round | Maximum votes First round votes Transfer votes |
|---|---|---|---|---|---|
| Nonpartisan | Selvena Brooks-Powers | 9 | 3,841 | 59.0% | |
| Nonpartisan | Pesach Osina | 9 | 2,674 | 41.0% | |
| Nonpartisan | Manny Silva | 8 | 1,059 | 15.2% | |
| Nonpartisan | LaToya Benjamin | 7 | 570 | 8.0% | |
| Nonpartisan | Sherwyn James | 6 | 386 | 5.4% | |
| Nonpartisan | Shawn Rux | 5 | 234 | 3.2% | |
| Nonpartisan | Nancy Martinez | 4 | 181 | 2.5% | |
| Nonpartisan | Latanya Collins | 3 | 120 | 1.6% | |
| Nonpartisan | Nicole Lee | 2 | 77 | 1.0% | |
| Write-in | | 1 | 24 | 0.3% | |

=== 2017 ===
2017 New York City Council election, District 31
| Party | Candidate | Votes | % |
|---|---|---|---|
| Democratic | Donovan Richards | 19,396 | |
| Working Families | Donovan Richards | 807 | |
| Total | Donovan Richards (incumbent) | 20,203 | 98.8 |
| Write-in | | 234 | 1.1 |
| Total votes | | 20,437 | 100 |
| Democratic hold | | | |

=== 2013 ===
2013 New York City Council election, District 31
Primary election
| Party | Candidate | Votes | % |
|---|---|---|---|
| Democratic | Donovan Richards (incumbent) | 6,762 | 51.6 |
| Democratic | Michael Duncan | 4,696 | 35.8 |
| Democratic | Ricardo Brown | 1,648 | 12.6 |
| Write-in | | 2 | 0.0 |
| Total votes | | 13,108 | 100 |
General election
| Democratic | Donovan Richards (incumbent) | 18,182 | 91.8 |
| Republican | Scherie Murray | 1,079 | 5.4 |
| Jobs & Education | Ricardo Brown | 530 | 2.7 |
| Write-in | | 22 | 0.1 |
| Total votes | | 19,813 | 100 |
| Democratic hold | | | |

=== 2013 special ===
In 2012, Councilman James Sanders Jr. was elected to the 10th district of the New York State Senate, triggering a February 2013 special election for his seat. Like most municipal special elections in New York City, the race was officially nonpartisan, with all candidates running on ballot lines of their own creation.

2013 New York City Council special election, District 31
| Party | Candidate | Votes | % |
|---|---|---|---|
| Community Unity | Donovan Richards | 2,646 | 29.1 |
| Common Values | Pesach Osina | 2,567 | 28.2 |
| The Forward | Jacques Léandre | 1,216 | 13.4 |
| Organize Now | Michael Duncan | 1,016 | 11.2 |
| Rebuild Now | Selvena Brooks | 1,013 | 11.1 |
| Better Service | Marie Adam-Ovide | 189 | 2.1 |
| Grand Coalition | Saywala Kesselly | 170 | 1.9 |
| People's Relief | Allan Jennings | 153 | 1.7 |
| Write-in | Earnest Flowers III | 105 | 1.2 |
| Write-in | | 16 | 0.1 |
| Total votes | | 9,091 | 100 |
