= When In Need Foundation =

American charitable organization

- Abbreviation: WIN
- Founder: Chetachi Nwoga-Ecton
- Type: 501(c)(3) nonprofit
- Headquarters: Philadelphia, Pennsylvania, U.S.
- Region served: United States and Nigeria
- President: Chetachi Nwoga-Ecton
- Website: winfound.org

The When In Need Foundation (WIN) is an American 501(c)(3) charitable organization headquartered in Philadelphia, Pennsylvania, which operates health, education, and food security programs in the United States and Nigeria. It maintains a branch in Queens, New York, and has been recognized as tax-exempt by the Internal Revenue Service since September 2014.

== History ==
Founder Chetachi Nwoga-Ecton in 2018

The foundation was established by Chetachi Nwoga-Ecton, a Nigerian-born businesswoman who emigrated to the United States and settled in Philadelphia, where she founded a home healthcare agency serving people with intellectual and developmental disabilities. Billboard reported in August 2014 that the organization was then rebuilding and furnishing an elementary school in Nigeria. The foundation received federal tax-exempt status the following month.

Writing in the Queens Gazette in 2018, Thomas Cogan described the organization as working to support under-resourced communities in both rural and urban settings, with activity concentrated in Nigeria but extending to South America and the United States.

== Organization ==
The foundation is headquartered in Philadelphia and operates a branch in Queens, New York, where it is a member of the Queens Chamber of Commerce. Speaking to PHL17 in 2016, Nwoga-Ecton said the organization was run by herself and three colleagues and that its teams carried out missions directly on the ground rather than through intermediaries. The Internal Revenue Service classifies the organization under the Youth Development category of the National Taxonomy of Exempt Entities.

Form 990 filings show total revenue of approximately $7.3 million between 2018 and 2024, derived entirely from contributions, with no program service or investment income reported in any year. Annual revenue has varied considerably over that period, from $2.79 million in 2021 to $100,032 in 2024.

== Programs ==
The Queens Gazette reported in 2018 that the organization's four principal areas of activity were food and agriculture, clean water, health care, and education, with its greatest emphasis on health care and particularly on combating malaria. Its principal international program, Mission of Mercy, was reported that year to work with seventeen orphanages across seven countries and territories, namely Nigeria, Argentina, Chile, the Bahamas, the Dominican Republic, the Turks and Caicos Islands, and the United States. PHL17 reported in 2016 that the program had also operated in Uruguay, the United Kingdom, and Italy, and that the organization had provided shoes to children, food to homeless people, and grants for higher education.

=== United States ===
The foundation has held an annual Thanksgiving dinner in Corona, Queens, for families unable to afford a holiday meal. Covering the 2015 event, NY1 reported that hundreds of residents attended, that entertainment was provided, and that families were able to take food home afterward. In Corona it has also partnered with local Dominican organizations on summer programs for schoolchildren and a back-to-school event distributing backpacks, and it has conducted health outreach in Forest Hills including counselling for teenage mothers.

The organization distributes prom and graduation gowns to students in Philadelphia and Queens, which the Queens Gazette reported amounted to approximately 300 dresses each spring, and has awarded educational scholarships including a $1,000 award to a student in Ozone Park, Queens.

In August 2016 CBS News Philadelphia reported on assistance the foundation provided to a single mother of six in Southwest Philadelphia who had been unable to pay an electricity bill of approximately $4,000 and had spent several months moving between hotels with her children. Volunteers supplied food, water, backpacks, and school supplies, and paid part of the arrears, enabling the family to return to their home.

=== Nigeria ===
In November 2016 the foundation sent a team to three rural communities in Nigeria to provide eye examinations and prescription glasses, appealing publicly beforehand for donations of over-the-counter medicines.

In 2017 it conducted a medical mission to Imo State involving approximately thirty doctors, which was joined by New York State Senator James Sanders Jr.. Sanders spent two weeks in Nigeria with the organization and was conferred an honorary chieftaincy by four traditional rulers during the visit.

In November 2018 the foundation carried out free medical testing and drug distribution, alongside food distribution, at Katampe II in the Mpape district of Abuja. A doctor working with the team told Daily Trust that the outreach aimed to serve approximately 3,000 people and to provide preventive health counselling.

In November 2024 Daily Trust reported that a foundation event in Abuja provided assistance to 370 widows, 20 students, and 10 trainees, with 100 of the women drawn from the Federal Capital Territory and 270 being widows of civilian, military, and police personnel. Speakers at the event included Noah Emmanuel, national president of the Non-governmental Association for Literacy Support Services, and Usman Nga Kupi, the Sa'Peyi of Garki.
