= Donovan Richards =

American politician (born 1983)

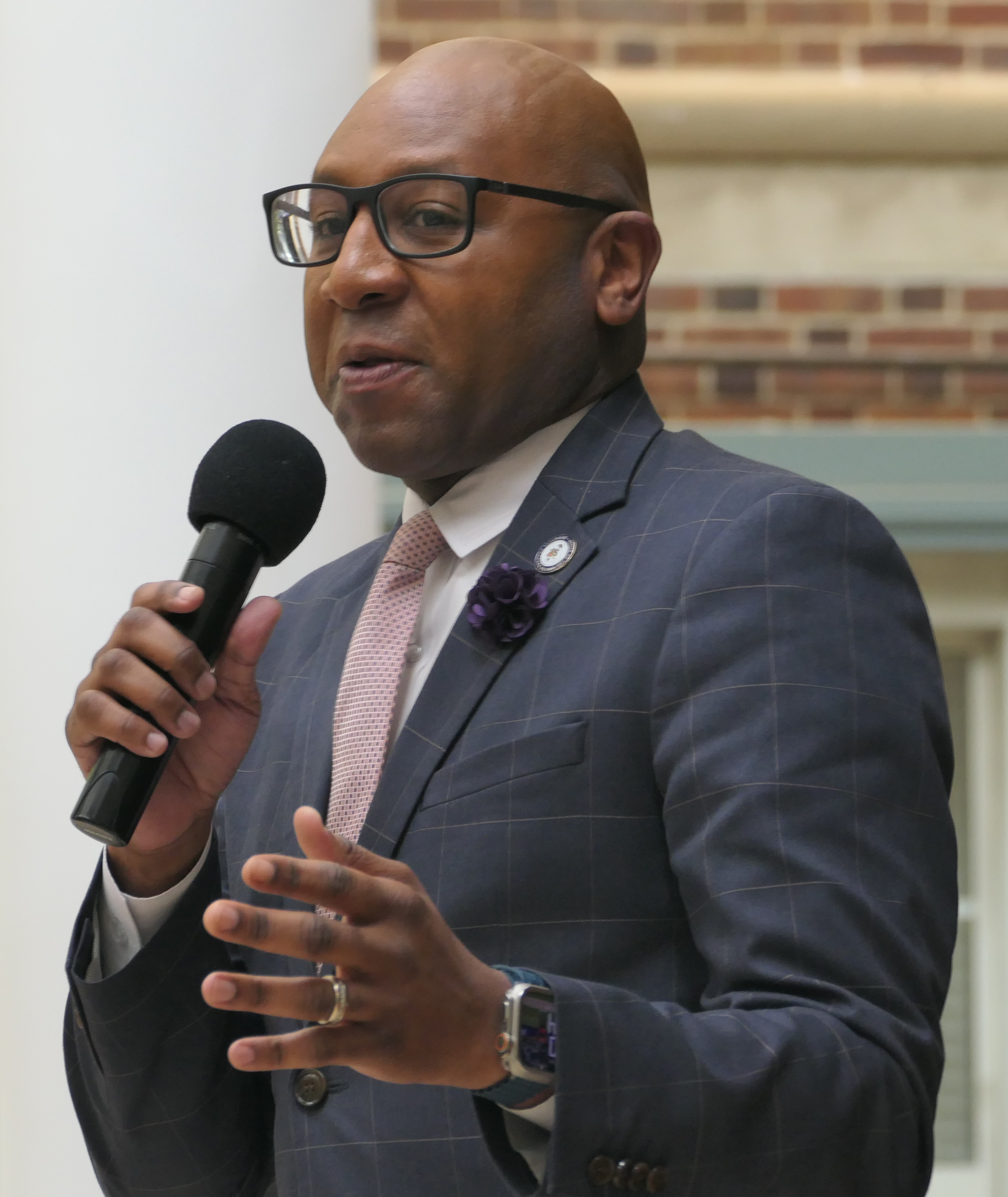
- Richards in 2025

21st Borough President of Queens
- Incumbent
- Assumed office December 2, 2020
- Preceded by: Sharon Lee (acting)

Member of the New York City Council from the 31st district
- In office February 20, 2013 – December 2, 2020
- Preceded by: James Sanders Jr.
- Succeeded by: Selvena Brooks-Powers

Personal details
- Born: April 9, 1983 (age 43) New York City, New York, U.S.
- Party: Democratic
- Education: Nyack College; Vaughn College of Aeronautics and Technology

Donovan J. Richards Jr. (born April 9, 1983) is an American politician serving as the Borough President of Queens. He is also a former New York City Council member, having represented the 31st district from 2013 to 2020. He is a member of the Democratic Party.

His former district includes portions of Arverne, Bayswater, Broad Channel, Cambria Heights, Edgemere, Far Rockaway, Howard Beach, Jamaica, John F. Kennedy International Airport, Laurelton, Rockaway Beach, Rosedale, South Ozone Park and Springfield Gardens in Queens.

Richards was the Democratic nominee for Queens Borough President in the November 3, 2020 general election. He defeated the Republican nominee Joann Ariola and independent candidate Dao Yin. Richards was sworn in as Queens Borough President on December 2, 2020.

== Life and career ==
Richards was born and raised in southeast Queens. When he was young, he served with a mission in Port-au-Prince, Haiti on behalf of St. Albans Congregational Church.

He attended Redemption Christian Academy in Troy, New York later graduating from Jamaica High School in Queens. He subsequently attended Nyack College, then Vaughn College of Aeronautics and Technology in Queens.

== New York City Council ==
In June 2011, Richards became the chief of staff for New York City Councilman James Sanders, Jr., and when Sanders was elected to the New York State Senate, Richards won a 2013 special election to succeed him. Richards was appointed chair of the Committee on Environmental Protection. Richards was appointed to be the chair of the Subcommittee on Zoning and Franchises.

Election history
Location	Year	Election	Results
NYC Council District 31	2013	Special	√ Donovan Richards 29.11% Pesach Osina 28.24% Jacques Leandre 13.38% Michael R. Duncan 11.18% Selvena Brooks 11.14% Marie Adam-Ovide 2.08% Saywala Kesselly 1.87%
NYC Council District 31	2013	Democratic Primary	√ Donovan Richards 51.60% Michael R. Duncan 35.83% Ricardo A. Brown 12.57%
NYC Council District 31	2013	General	√ Donovan Richards (D) 91.77% Scherie S. Murray (R) 5.45% Ricardo A. Brown (Jobs & Education) 2.68%

== Queens Borough President bids ==
In June 2020, Richards secured the Democratic nomination for Borough President of Queens. On November 3, 2020, Richards won the special election for Borough President of Queens. Richards won reelection in 2021 and 2025.

=== 2020 election results ===
2020 Queens borough president election
Party	Candidate	Votes	%	±%
Democratic	Donovan Richards	518,840 votes	70%	
Republican	Joann Ariola	205,893	27.7%	
Red Dragon Party	Dao Yin	17,166	2.3%	
Write-in		820	0.11%	
Total votes		742,719	100.0%	
Democratic hold				

=== 2021 election results ===
2021 Queens borough president election
Party	Candidate	Votes	%	±%
Democratic	Donovan Richards (incumbent)	181,947	66.86%	−2.99%
Republican	Thomas Zmich	80,353	29.53%	+5.01%
Conservative	Thomas Zmich	9,292	3.41%	+1.18%
Total	Thomas Zmich	89,645	32.94%	+5.22%
Write-in		538	0.20%	
Total votes		272,130	100.0%	
Democratic hold				

=== 2025 election results ===
2025 Queens borough president election
Party	Candidate	Votes	%	±%
Democratic	Donovan Richards (incumbent)	322,312	70.01	
Republican	Henry Ikezi	130,518	28.35	
United Alliance	Henry Ikezi	6,599	1.43	
Total	Henry Ikezi	137,117	29.78	
Write-in		979	0.21	
Total votes		460,408	100%	

Political offices
Preceded by Sharon Lee; Acting	Borough President of Queens; 2020–present	Incumbent
