= Remington Vernam =

Remington Vernam may refer to:

- Remington D. B. Vernam, World War I flying ace
- Remington Vernam (land developer), founder of the neighborhood of Arverne, Queens in the Rockaway Peninsula of New York City
