= Selvena Brooks-Powers =

American politician and community organizer

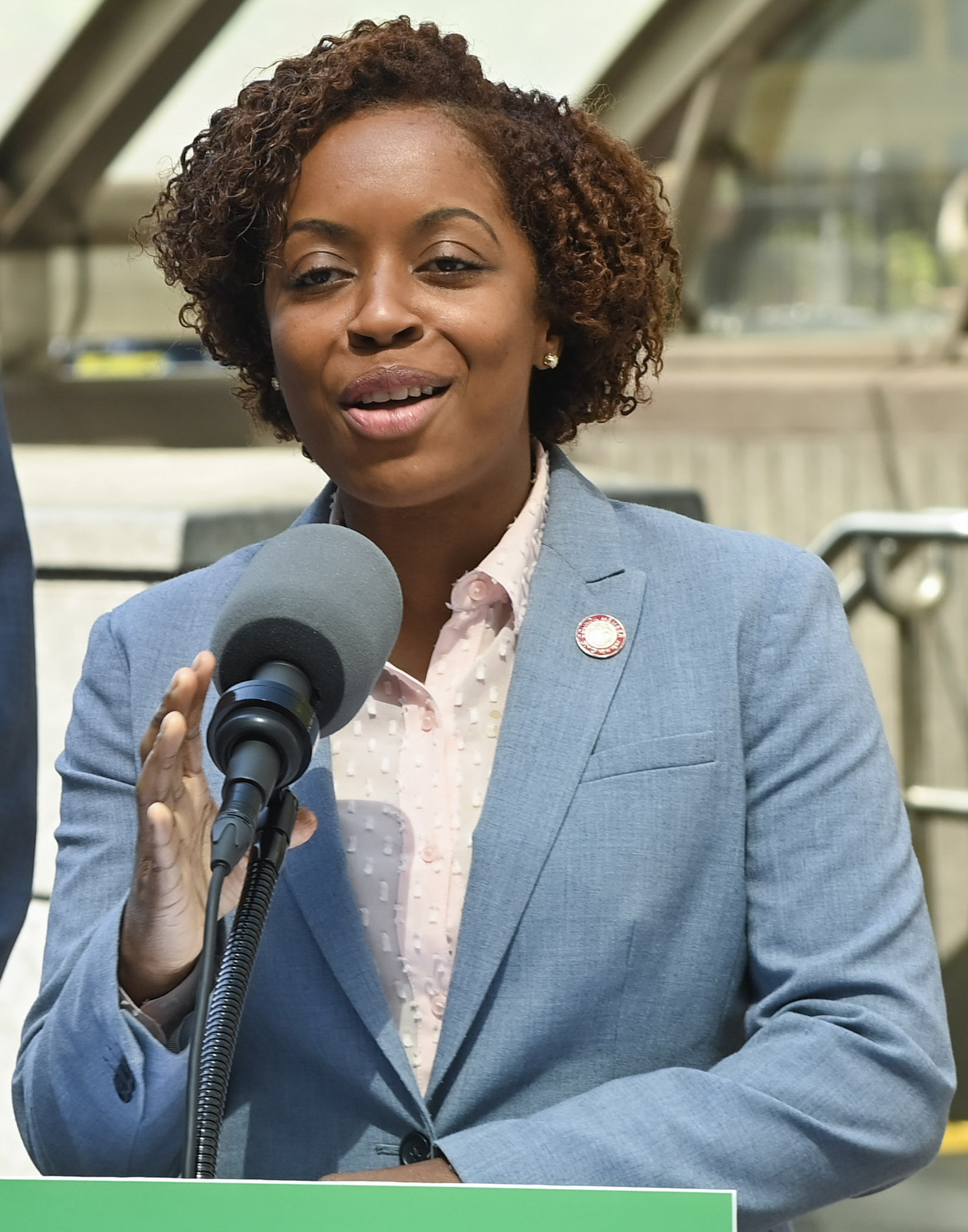

Member of the New York City Council from the 31st district
- Incumbent
- Assumed office March 19, 2021
- Preceded by: Donovan Richards

Majority Whip of the New York City Council
- In office January 5, 2022 – January 15, 2026
- Speaker: Adrienne Adams
- Preceded by: Position reestablished
- Succeeded by: Kamillah Hanks

Personal details
- Born: March 1, 1983 (age 43)
- Party: Democratic
- Education: Wilberforce University (BA); New York University (MS)
- Website: City Council website

Selvena N. Brooks-Powers (born March 1, 1983) is an American politician and community organizer serving as a member of the New York City Council from the 31st district. She assumed office on March 19, 2021. Brooks-Powers was named majority whip of the City Council in January 2022.

== Early life and education ==
Brooks-Powers was raised in Queens, New York City. She earned a Bachelor of Arts degree in sociology from Wilberforce University and a Master of Science in global affairs from New York University.

== Career ==
Brooks-Powers began her career as a staffer to Democratic members of the New York State Senate. She later worked on Dennis Herrera's campaign for mayor of San Francisco. In 2012 and 2013, she worked as a communications specialist for the Service Employees International Union. She also worked as a press officer in the office of the New York City Comptroller. Brooks-Powers has since worked as an independent political consultant. She was elected to the New York City Council on March 19, 2021.

== The New York City Council ==
New York City Council Members Selvena Brooks-Powers and Farah Louis.

In April 2025, Brooks-Powers and Councilwoman Lynn Schulman were removed as members from the New York City Council's budget committee by New York City Council Speaker Adrienne Adams. Speaker Adams ran for mayor of New York in the 2025 Democratic Primary, losing to Mayor Zohran Mamdani. Both Brooks-Powers and Schulman endorsed mayoral candidate Andrew Cuomo in March 2025.

Councilwoman Brooks-Powers also served as the Majority Whip of the City Council and Chair of the City Council's Committee on Transportation and Infrastructure throughout Eric Adams tenure as mayor, losing both roles in January 2026. The councilwoman came on record in March 2025 as a vocal opponent of the removal of cars from a bike lane in Downtown Far Rockaway, stating "It wasn’t supported by the community. ... In effect it’s not a bike lane quite honestly; no one uses it, they [drivers] park there. We would like to see the hard infrastructure removed."

As Councilwoman, she's led efforts on expanding the MTA's Fair Fares program, the legalization of jaywalking in New York City, expanding outreach on flood preparedness, and transferring land ownership of a vacant lot from NYCHA to the city for the building of a trauma center in Arverne.

== Electoral history ==
=== 2025 ===
2025 New York City Council election, District 31
Party	Candidate	Votes	%
Democratic	Selvena Brooks-Powers (incumbent)	26,211	99.0
Write-in		254	1.0
Total votes		26,465	100.0
Democratic hold			

=== 2023 ===
2023 New York City Council election, District 31
Party	Candidate	Votes	%
Democratic	Selvena Brooks-Powers (incumbent)	8,868	89.2
Republican	Daniella M. May	972	9.8
Mad as Hell/Parent Party	Daniella M. May	81	0.8
Total	Daniella M. May	1,053	10.6
Write-in		25	0.3
Total votes		9,946	100.0
Democratic hold			

=== 2021 ===
2021 New York City's 31st City Council district special election
Party	Candidate	Maximum round	Maximum votes	Share in maximum round	Maximum votes First round votes Transfer votes
Powers 4 Queens	Selvena Brooks-Powers	9	3,841	59.0%	
Community Unity	Pesach Osina	9	2,674	41.0%	
People Powered	Manny Silva	8	1,059	15.2%	
The Time Is Now	Latoya R. Benjamin	7	570	8.0%	
Time for Change	Sherwyn James	6	386	5.4%	
Rux For Us	Shawn M. Rux	5	234	3.2%	
Rockaway United	Nancy J. Martinez	4	181	2.5%	
Collins 4 Queens	Latanya Collins	3	120	1.6%	
Lee For Jobs 31	Nicole S. Lee	2	77	1.0%	
Write-In		1	24	0.3%	
Democratic hold					

2021 New York City Council Democratic primary, District 31
Party	Candidate	Votes	%
Democratic	Selvena Brooks-Powers (incumbent)	10,807	67.4
Democratic	Nancy J. Martinez	3,049	19.0
Democratic	Nicole S. Lee	2,039	12.7
Write-in		136	0.8
Total votes		16,031	100.0

2021 New York City Council election, District 31
Party	Candidate	Votes	%
Democratic	Selvena Brooks-Powers (incumbent)	18,070	88.9
Republican	Vanessa Pollie Simon (Note: Shared with "Save Our City" ballot line.)	1,902	9.4
Conservative	Vanessa Pollie Simon	324	1.6
Total	Vanessa Pollie Simon	2,226	11.0
Write-in		28	0.1
Total votes		20,324	100.0
Democratic hold			
