= Kohlreiter Square =

Green space in Queens, New York

Coordinates: 40.591174°N 73.796567°W

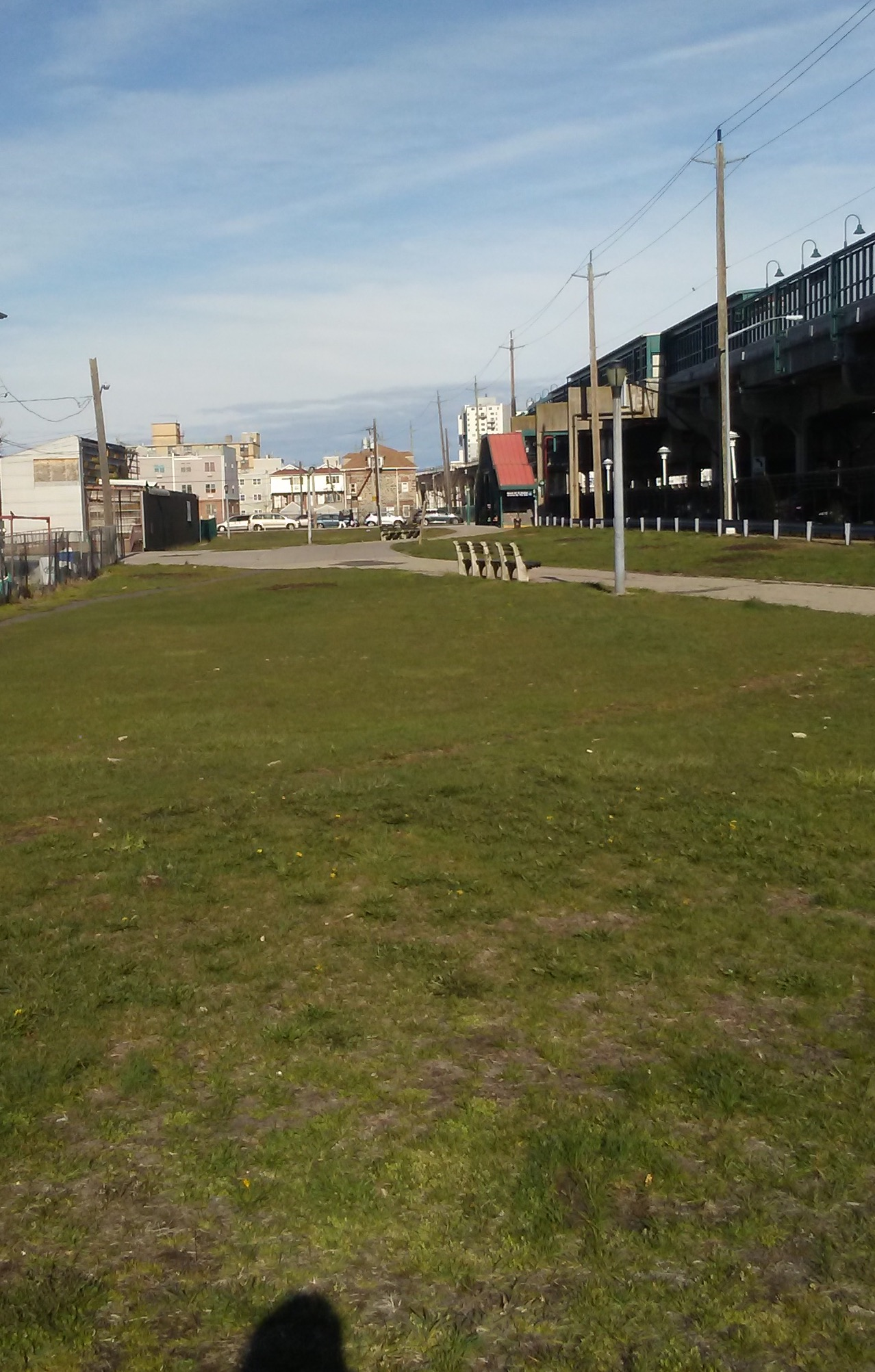
Kohlreiter Square in 2016

Kohlreiter Square is an 8.6-acre (3.5 ha) public green space located in the Arverne neighborhood on Rockaway Peninsula in Queens, New York. It is located along the north side of Rockaway Freeway, between Beach 67th and Beach 69th Streets.

The park honors two generations of civic activists, Nathan A. Kohlreiter (1880–1961) and his son Fred Kohlreiter (1913–1990) who contributed to the political and social fabric of the neighborhood.

== History ==
Kohlreiter Square dates to the early twentieth century, when it served as a plaza to the Arverne – Gaston Avenue Long Island Railroad (LIRR) station. The station opened in 1887, shortly before the completion of Arverne-By-The-Sea, a community of upscale summer homes and hotels along the beach. The neighborhood’s name is an abbreviation of its developer’s name, Remington R. Vernam. The tracks were elevated in 1942, with the Rockaway Freeway running beneath them. As part of a grade elimination project, undeveloped and condemned properties along the Freeway were acquired by the city as parkland. The station plaza was acquired from the LIRR in 1946.

In 2001 construction commenced on a new residential community that revived the name Arverne-by-the-Sea. Comprising single and multi-family homes to the south of Rockaway Freeway, it includes a retail plaza on the southern side of the subway station, adjoining Kohlreiter Square. Before 2001, there was a Joseph P. Addabbo Family Health Center on the southern side of the 67th street subway station, and a synagogue across the street from the health center. The synagogue burned down in May 2002, and the family health center moved to a new building on Beach 62nd street after it was built in 2005. The old building was torn down in 2006 during the construction of the retail plaza.
