= New York's 10th State Senate district =

American legislative district

Senator
James Sanders Jr. D–Far Rockaway
- Registration: 76.2% Democratic; 5.3% Republican; 15.7% No party preference
- Demographics: 6% White; 47% Black; 22% Hispanic; 14% Asian; 7% Other
- Population (2017): 353,249
- Registered voters: 183,790

New York's 10th State Senate district is one of 63 districts in the New York State Senate. It has been represented by Democrat James Sanders Jr. since 2013, following his defeat of incumbent Shirley Huntley in the 2012 Democratic primary election.

== Geography ==
=== 2020s ===
District 10 is located in Southeast Queens, centered around JFK International Airport. It includes most of Springfield Gardens, The Rockaways and portions of Rosedale, South Ozone Park, Howard Beach, Baisley Park, and Jamaica. Baisley Pond Park and most of the Jamaica Bay Wildlife Refuge lie within the district.

The district is entirely within New York's 5th congressional district. It also overlaps with the 23rd, 29th, 31st and 32nd districts of the New York State Assembly and the 27th, 28th, 31st and 32nd districts of the New York City Council.

=== 2010s ===
District 10 is located in Southeast Queens, including the neighborhoods of Laurelton, Rosedale, Springfield Gardens, Edgemere, Bayswater, Arverne, and Far Rockaway, as well as the John F. Kennedy International Airport.

The district overlaps with New York's 5th, 6th, and 7th congressional districts, and with the 23rd, 24th, 28th, 29th, 31st, 32nd, and 38th districts of the New York State Assembly.

== Recent election results ==
=== 2026 ===
2026 New York State Senate election, District 10
Party	Candidate	Votes	%
Democratic	James Sanders Jr.		
Working Families	James Sanders Jr.		
Total	James Sanders Jr. (incumbent)		
Write-in			
Total votes			100.0

=== 2024 ===
2024 New York State Senate election, District 10
Party	Candidate	Votes	%
Democratic	James Sanders Jr.	65,391	
Working Families	James Sanders Jr.	2,683	
Total	James Sanders Jr. (incumbent)	68,074	71.0
Republican	Michael O'Reilly	25,129	
Conservative	Michael O'Reilly	2,151	
Common Sense	Michael O'Reilly	393	
Total	Michael O'Reilly	27,673	28.9
Write-in		144	0.1
Total votes		95,891	100.0
Democratic hold			

=== 2022 ===
2022 New York State Senate election, District 10
Party	Candidate	Votes	%
Democratic	James Sanders Jr. (incumbent)	43,880	98.5
Write-in		636	1.5
Total votes		44,516	100.0
Democratic hold			

=== 2020 ===
2020 New York State Senate election, District 10
Party	Candidate	Votes	%
Democratic	James Sanders Jr.	88,990	
Working Families	James Sanders Jr.	5,565	
Total	James Sanders Jr. (incumbent)	94,555	99.7
Write-in		281	0.3
Total votes		94,836	100.0
Democratic hold			

=== 2018 ===
2018 New York State Senate election, District 10
Party	Candidate	Votes	%
Democratic	James Sanders Jr.	62,095	
Working Families	James Sanders Jr.	1,461	
Reform	James Sanders Jr.	148	
Total	James Sanders Jr. (incumbent)	63,704	99.6
Write-in		212	0.3
Total votes		63,916	100.0
Democratic hold			

=== 2016 ===
2016 New York State Senate election, District 10
Primary election
Party	Candidate	Votes	%
Democratic	James Sanders Jr. (incumbent)	5,495	57.8
Democratic	Adrienne Adams	3,988	41.9
Write-in		28	0.3
Total votes		9,511	100.0
General election
Democratic	James Sanders Jr.	82,219	
Working Families	James Sanders Jr.	2,363	
Total	James Sanders Jr. (incumbent)	84,582	96.4
Women's Equality	Adrienne Adams	3,054	3.5
Write-in		96	0.1
Total votes		87,732	100.0
Democratic hold			

=== 2014 ===
2014 New York State Senate election, District 10
Primary election
Party	Candidate	Votes	%
Democratic	James Sanders Jr. (incumbent)	6,340	73.2
Democratic	Everly Brown	1,893	21.8
Democratic	Gian Jones	341	3.9
Write-in		96	1.1
Total votes		8,651	100.0
General election
Democratic	James Sanders Jr.	28,207	
Working Families	James Sanders Jr.	1,191	
Total	James Sanders Jr. (incumbent)	29,398	99.7
Write-in		101	0.3
Total votes		29,499	100.0
Democratic hold			

=== 2012 ===
2012 New York State Senate election, District 10
Primary election
Party	Candidate	Votes	%
Democratic	James Sanders Jr.	5,322	56.6
Democratic	Shirley Huntley (incumbent)	3,747	39.8
Democratic	Gian Jones	328	3.5
Write-in		101	0.1
Total votes		9,426	100.0
General election
Democratic	James Sanders Jr.	67,474	99.9
Write-in		93	0.1
Total votes		67,567	100.0
Democratic hold			

=== Federal results in District 10 ===
Year	Office	Results
2020	President	Biden 86.5 – 12.7%
2016	President	Clinton 90.6 – 8.0%
2012	President	Obama 94.3 – 5.4%
2012	Senate	Gillibrand 95.1 – 4.5%
