= Broad Channel station =

New York City Subway station in Queens

Broad Channel
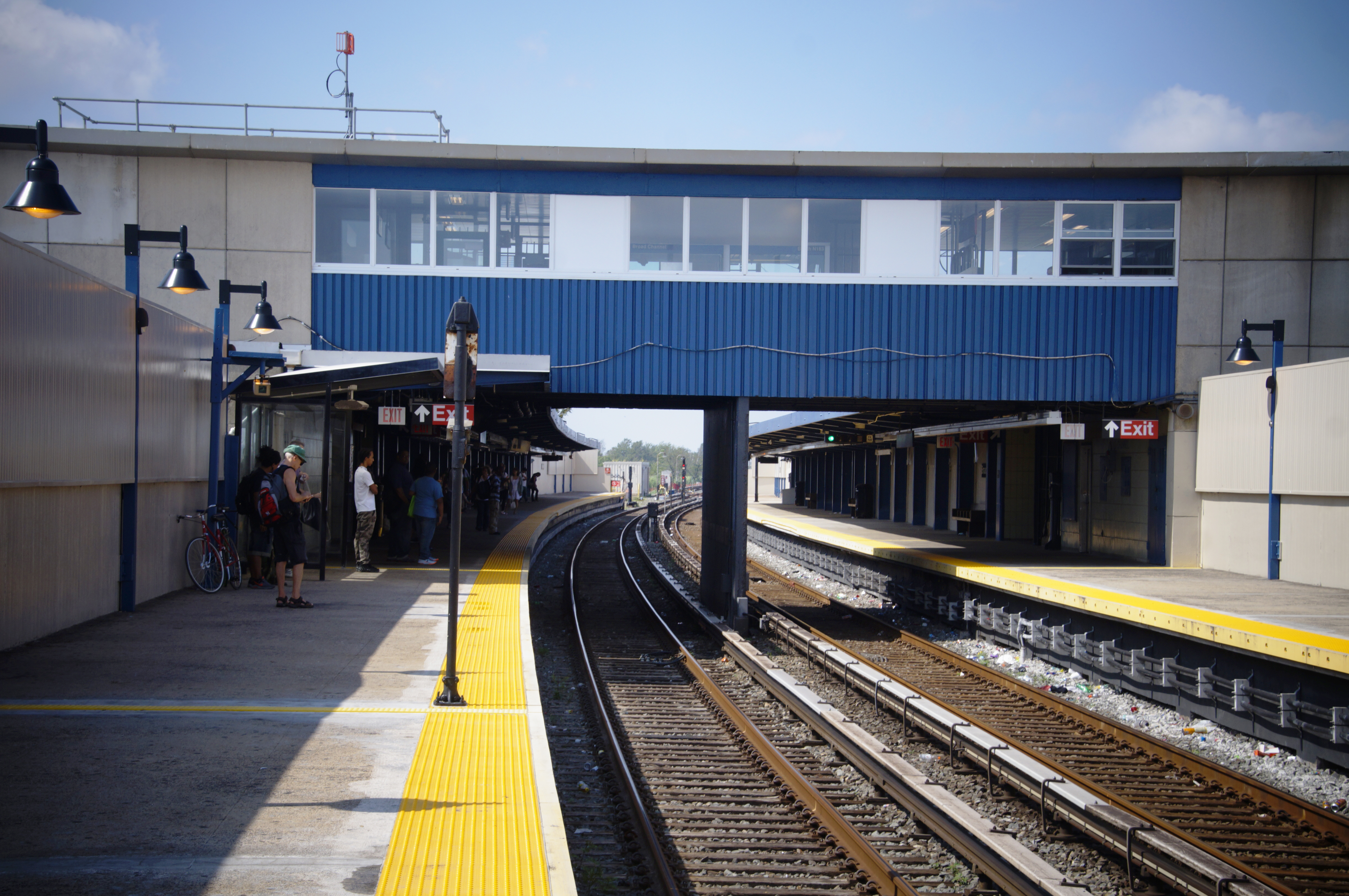
- Broad Channel station after the post-Hurricane Sandy renovation

Station statistics
- Address: Noel Road & West Road; Queens, New York
- Borough: Queens
- Locale: Broad Channel
- Coordinates: 40.609°N 73.816°W
- Division: B (IND, formerly LIRR Rockaway Beach Branch)
- Line: IND Rockaway Line
- Services: A (all times); S (all times)
- Transit: MTA Bus: Q52/Q53 SBS, QM16, QM17
- Structure: At-grade
- Platforms: 2 side platforms
- Tracks: 2

Other information
- Opened: 1880; 146 years ago (LIRR station)
- Closed: 1950; 76 years ago (LIRR station)
- Rebuilt: June 28, 1956; 70 years ago (as a Subway station)
- Accessibility: Same-platform transfer available

Traffic
- 2025: 38,720 ▼35.5%
- Rank: 423 out of 423
Services
Preceding station	New York City Subway	Following station
Howard Beach–JFK Airport A toward Inwood–207th Street	A (New York City Subway service)	Beach 67th Street A toward Far Rockaway–Mott Avenue
Beach 90th Street A S toward Rockaway Park–Beach 116th Street	Rockaway Park	Terminus
Former services
Preceding station	Long Island Rail Road	Following station
The Raunt toward Woodside	Rockaway Beach Division	Beach Channel toward Gibson or Rockaway Park
Preceding station	Brooklyn Rapid Transit	Following station
The Raunt toward Chambers Street	Union Elevated Broadway Line 1898–1917	Hammels toward Rockaway Park
The Raunt toward Park Row	Union Elevated Fifth Avenue Line 1899–1905	Hammels toward Rockaway Park
Location
Location within New York City Subway
Location within New York City
Location within New York
Track layout
Street map
Station service legend
Symbol	Description
Stops all times	Stops all times
Stops rush hours in the peak direction only	Stops rush hours in the peak direction only

The Broad Channel station is a station on the IND Rockaway Line of the New York City Subway, located in the neighborhood of the same name at Noel and West Roads in the borough of Queens. It is served by the A train and the Rockaway Park Shuttle at all times, the latter of which originates and terminates here except in the summertime on weekends during the day. Broad Channel originally opened in 1880 as a Long Island Railroad station. The LIRR discontinued service in 1950 after a fire on the trestle across Jamaica Bay, to the station's north. The station reopened June 28, 1956, as a subway station.

Broad Channel is the only subway station serving the island of Broad Channel, which is located in Jamaica Bay and only has about 3,000 residents. Thus it is the least-used in the subway as of 2023. However, this station is the only transfer point for riders traveling to Brooklyn and Manhattan (which the A train travels to) and the four other stations served by the Rockaway Park Shuttle. North of this station, there are two additional tracks within the right-of-way: a short track that allows Rockaway Park Shuttle trains to reverse direction and return to the Rockaways, and a longer track that is used to test new subway cars.

== History ==
The station originally opened in 1880 as a New York, Woodhaven and Rockaway Railroad station (although some sources claim it opened in June 1881) and was acquired by the Long Island Rail Road, to become a station on the Rockaway Beach Branch.

As a Long Island Rail Road station it served as one of two junctions between the Far Rockaway and Rockaway Beach Branches. The other junction was at Hammels station, although it was originally a junction for the Far Rockaway Branch and the Ocean Electric Railway. Hammels is now located where Hammels Wye is. Wooden shelter sheds were added to the station in 1921 and 1923. A fire on the trestle between this station and another one known as The Raunt, located to the north, forced the closure of both stations on May 23, 1950, as well as the entire Jamaica Bay trestle which stretches from Howard Beach to Hammels Wye.

By October 3, 1955, the Rockaway Beach Branch south of Ozone Park, and all of the Far Rockaway Branch west of Far Rockaway were purchased by the New York City Transit Authority. The Broad Channel station was completely reconstructed (as were the Howard Beach and Far Rockaway stations) with new concrete platforms, and a new station house. The contract for the new station was approved in December 1954. The station opened to subway service on June 28, 1956.

The station and the adjacent segment of the Rockaway Line suffered serious damage during Hurricane Sandy in 2012, and was out of service for several months. Due to its location in the middle of Jamaica Bay, the station was filled with debris, with its trackbed damaged. During its temporary closure, the station received new ADA-tactile strips, platform edge rubbing boards, and cosmetic and mechanical work. Service was restored to the station on May 30, 2013, and to celebrate the re-opening, a vintage R1 subway car formed the first train. In 2018, a two-phase program of flood mitigation work along the Hammels Wye required further service disruptions. The first phase, from April 9 to May 18, suspended rush-hour A trips to Rockaway Park. The second phase, which began on July 1, rerouted all Far Rockaway A service to Rockaway Park until September 3. In both phases, the shuttle ran from Rockaway Park to Far Rockaway, skipping Broad Channel.

To allow the MTA to repair the South Channel Bridge, service on the A south of Howard Beach was suspended for 17 weeks beginning on January 17, 2025, and the Rockaway Park Shuttle ran between Rockaway Park and Far Rockaway. In addition, shuttle bus service was available between Howard Beach and the Rockaways. During this time, the Broad Channel station was closed.

== Station layout ==
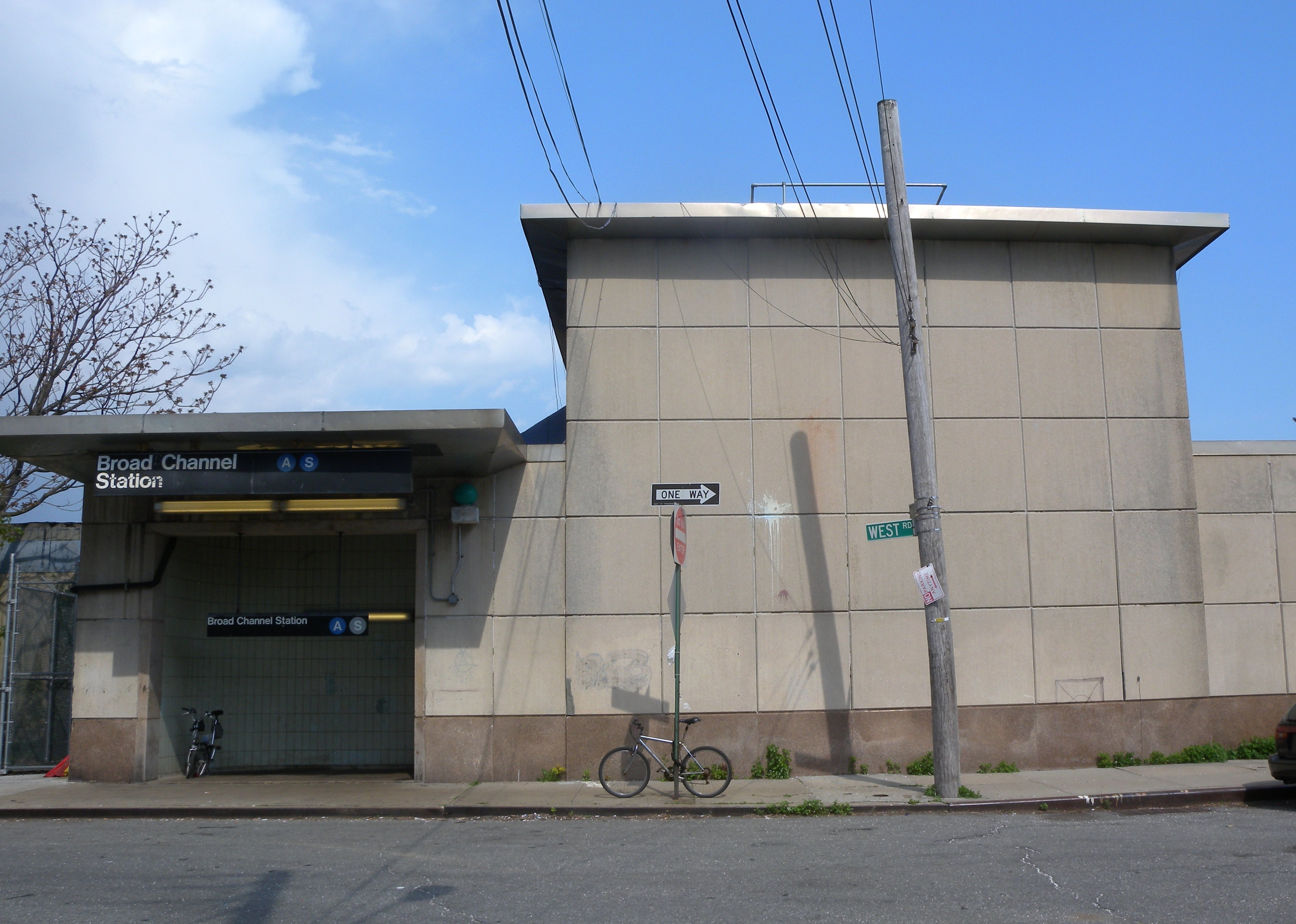
Noel Road entrance

This station has two tracks and two side platforms, each measuring 12 feet (3.7 m) wide and over 660 feet (200 m) long. The northern parts of the platforms are sheltered with canopies and windscreens. The station is served by the A train and the Rockaway Park Shuttle at all times, serving as the northern terminus of the latter. The next stop to the north is Howard Beach–JFK Airport for A trains, as well as for the Rockaway Park Shuttle when it is extended four stations north to Rockaway Boulevard only in the summertime on weekends during the day. The next stop to the south is Beach 67th Street for Far Rockaway A trains and Beach 90th Street for the Rockaway Park Shuttle, as well as for limited A trains only in the peak direction during the p.m. rush hour. The station is one of two New York City Subway stations located on its own island, the other being the Roosevelt Island station in Manhattan, serving the F and M trains.

=== Exit ===
A station house is located above both platforms, containing a crossover, waiting area and fare control. The single street staircase outside of fare control goes down to West Road by the intersection of Noel Road next to the Rockaway-bound platform. (Note: The document states that the station was located at 194th Avenue. Today, this street is known as Noel Road.) This platform also has a set of exit-only turnstiles leading directly to this staircase so riders exiting the station on this side do not have to go through the station house. The station house is heated, while the platforms feature passenger-activated heaters; these heaters, and the doors separating the station house and staircases, were not originally part of the station. The station house used to have 1950s-era signage at its front entrance reading "SUBWAY", but now only has modern MTA entrance signs.

At the north end of the station is a power substation, located at West Road and East 6th Road adjacent to the Rockaway-bound platform. A second exit-only staircase is located here, but is closed.

=== Track layout ===
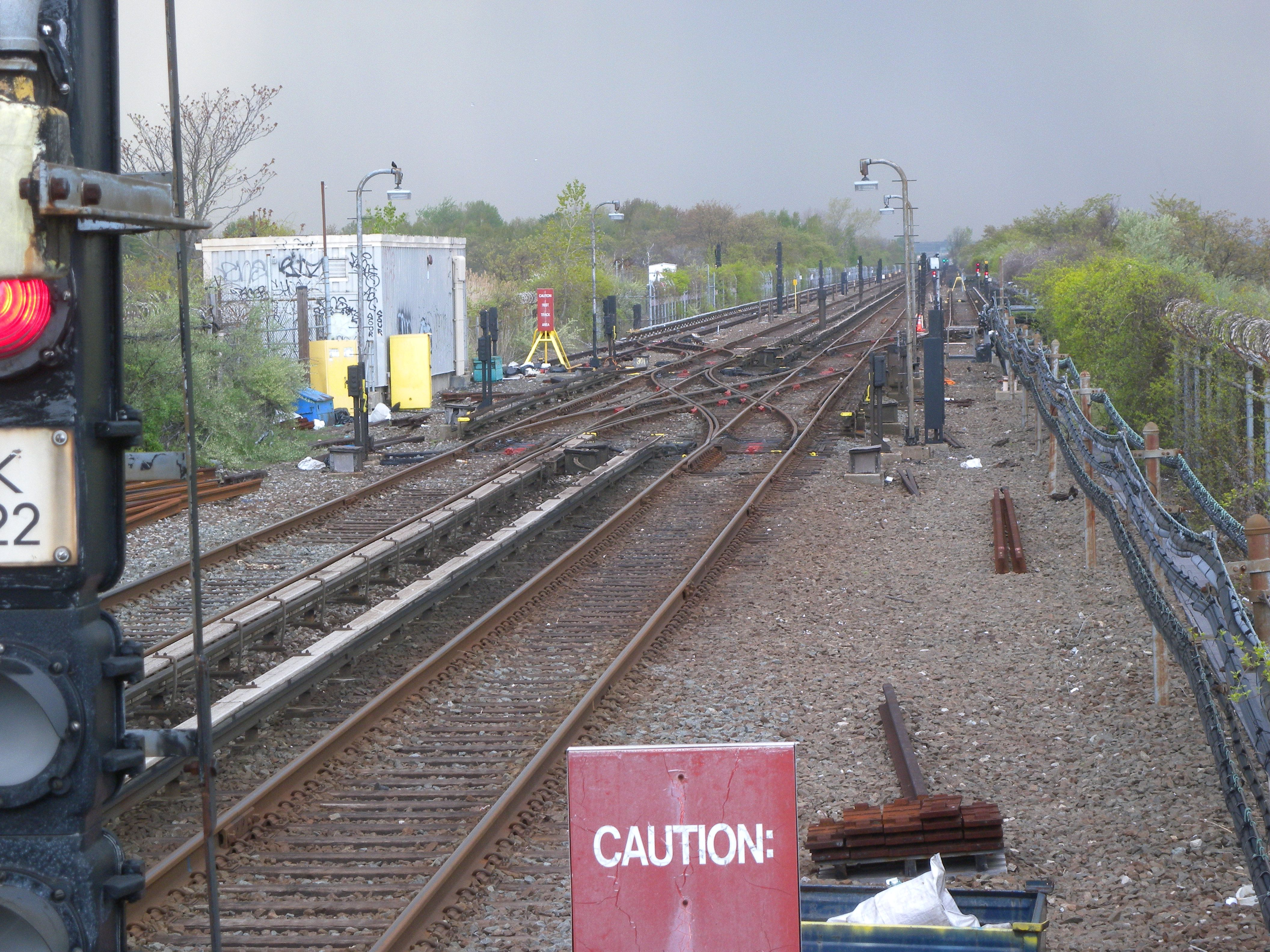
The crossovers that lead to the tail track on the right and to the track used to test new trains on the left

Just to the north, the Rockaway Line gains two extra non-revenue tracks straddling the two revenue tracks. The western track is a test track, installed in 2001 and called the Far Rockaway Test Track, while the eastern track is used to relay shuttle trains. The western track extends around 10,000 feet (3,000 m) or nearly 2 miles (3.2 km), while the eastern track is long enough for one full-length train (600 feet (180 m)) and ends at a bumper block. The test track was installed in 2001 by New York City Transit's Maintenance of Way Department to ensure that new cars have undergone necessary acceleration and braking tests before being put into revenue service. This was because NYCT needed to recover a greater amount of braking energy and reduce power demand peaks with the introduction of AC-motored cars with the capability for regenerative braking. A kinetic energy storage system with KESS technology was installed, and as a result, the voltage regulation of the track improved. The system provides voltage support to the revenue tracks as well as reinforcing the voltage of the test track during the testing of new trains.

Continuing north, the Rockaway Line crosses Jamaica Bay before reaching Howard Beach; the distance of 3.5 miles (5.6 km) between the two stations is the longest between any two in the New York City Subway system. To the south, the Rockaway Line continues to the Rockaway peninsula, crossing two bridges: a fixed span between Broad Channel and Subway Island, and a swing span between Subway Island and the Rockaway peninsula. On the peninsula, the line splits at a flying junction named Hammels Wye to allow service to both Far Rockaway–Mott Avenue and Rockaway Park–Beach 116th Street. Punch boxes are located at the ends of both platforms, to allow train operators to select the correct route. The switches are then accordingly switched by the local tower operator.

== Ridership ==
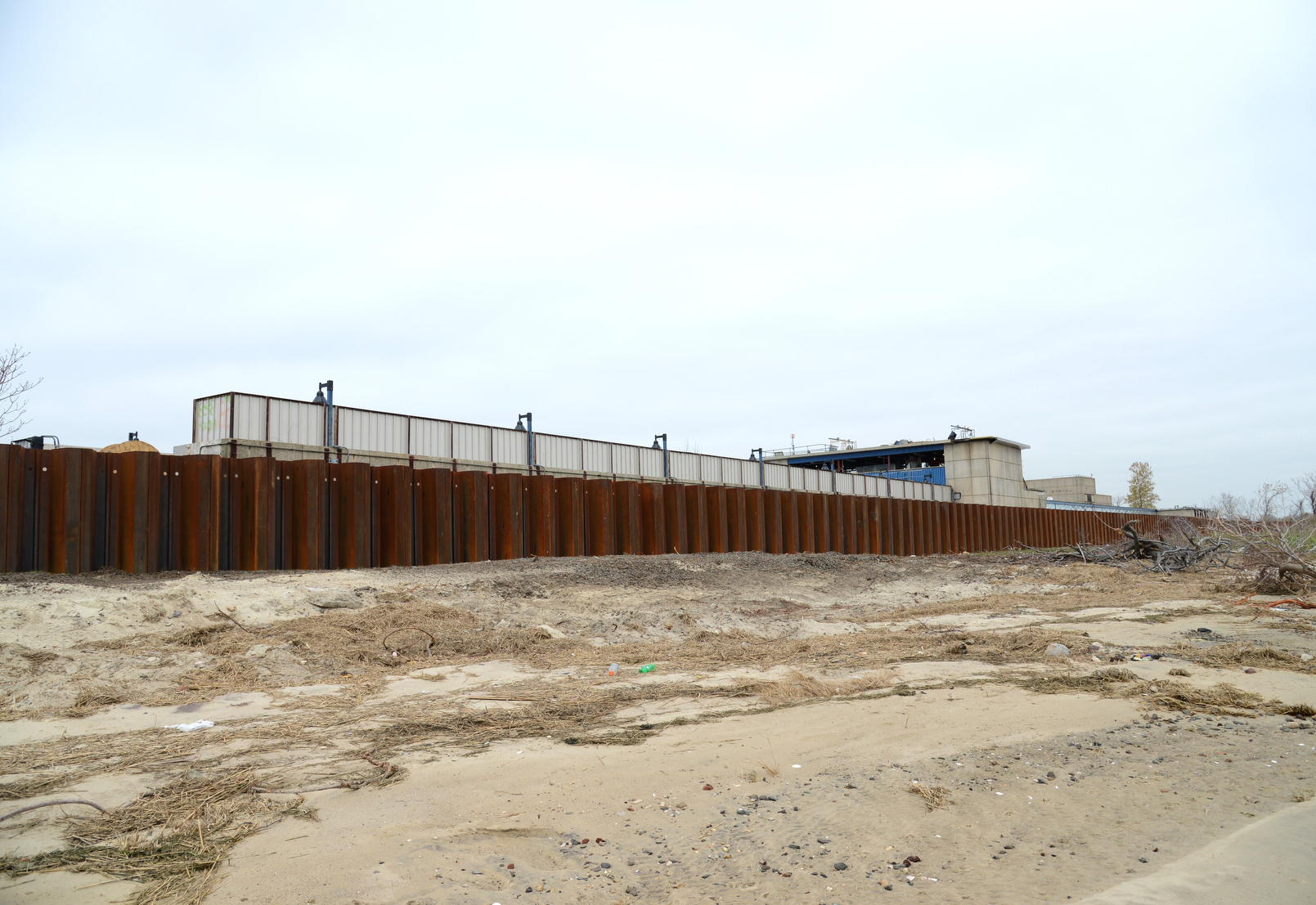
The seawall protecting the station, installed after Hurricane Sandy

Broad Channel is a small island with fewer than 3,000 residents, and as a result, it has historically been one of the least-used stations in the system. In 1985, the station had only 224 paying daily riders on a typical weekday, making it one of the least used stations in the system. The station had the second lowest ridership in the subway system as of 2019, with 38,720 annual riders. By 2021, it was the system's least-used station overall, with 39,981 annual riders. However, it is the only transfer point between the A train and the Rockaway Park Shuttle, and some 2,700 daily riders use it in this capacity. As a result, the platforms are sometimes packed.

Nearby points of interest include a visitor center and trails for the Gateway National Recreation Area's Jamaica Bay Wildlife Refuge. The Refuge is one of the most significant bird sanctuaries in the Northeastern United States, and it is home to more than 330 bird species, making it one of the most ideal places in New York City to observe migrating birds. The visitor center is the start of many guided tours of the refuge and it is home to exhibits that discuss the history of Jamaica Bay, the wide array of wildlife that can be found there, and the impact of human activity.

== Gallery ==
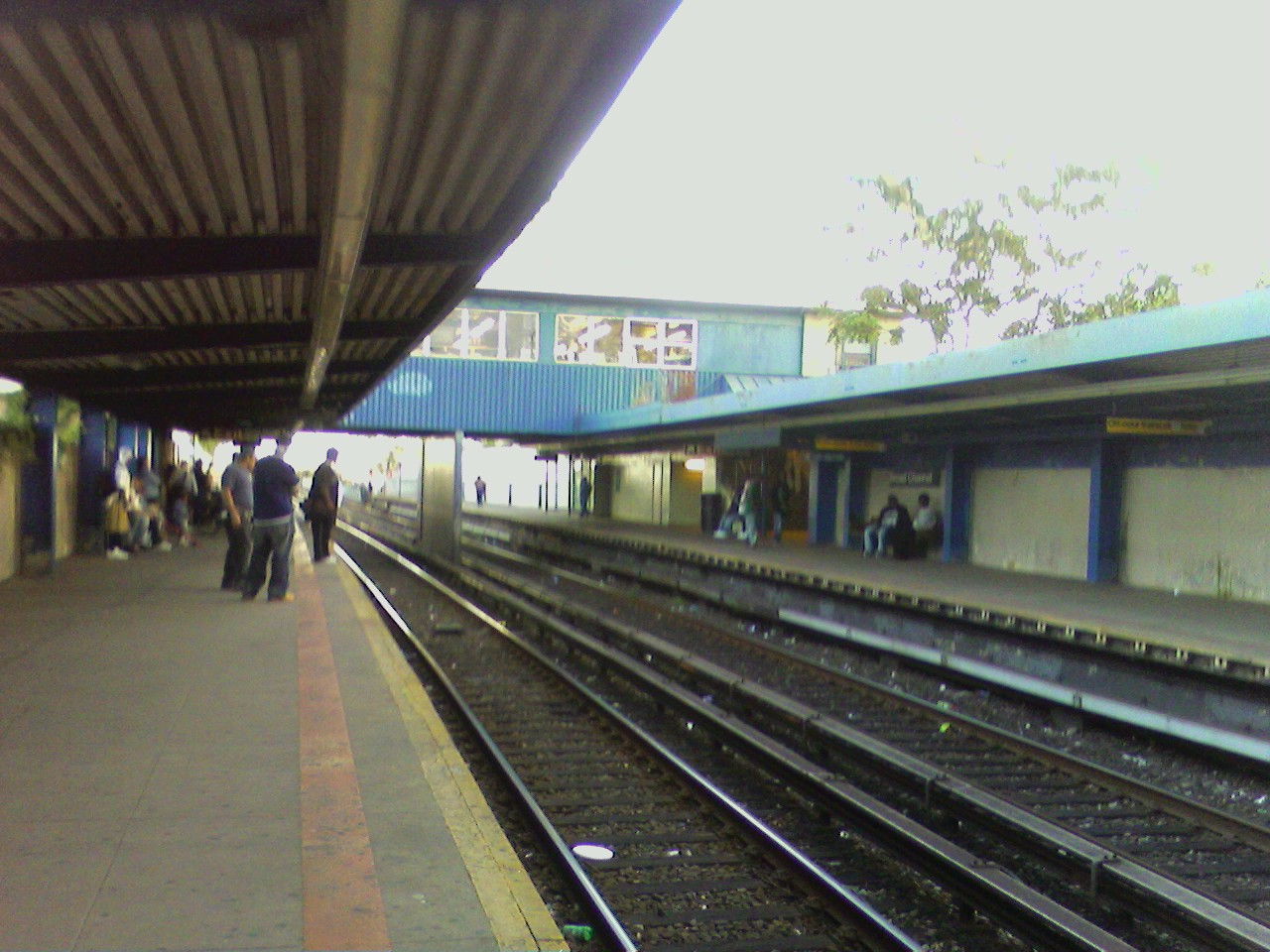
A view of the northbound platform at Broad Channel facing to the south, prior to renovations

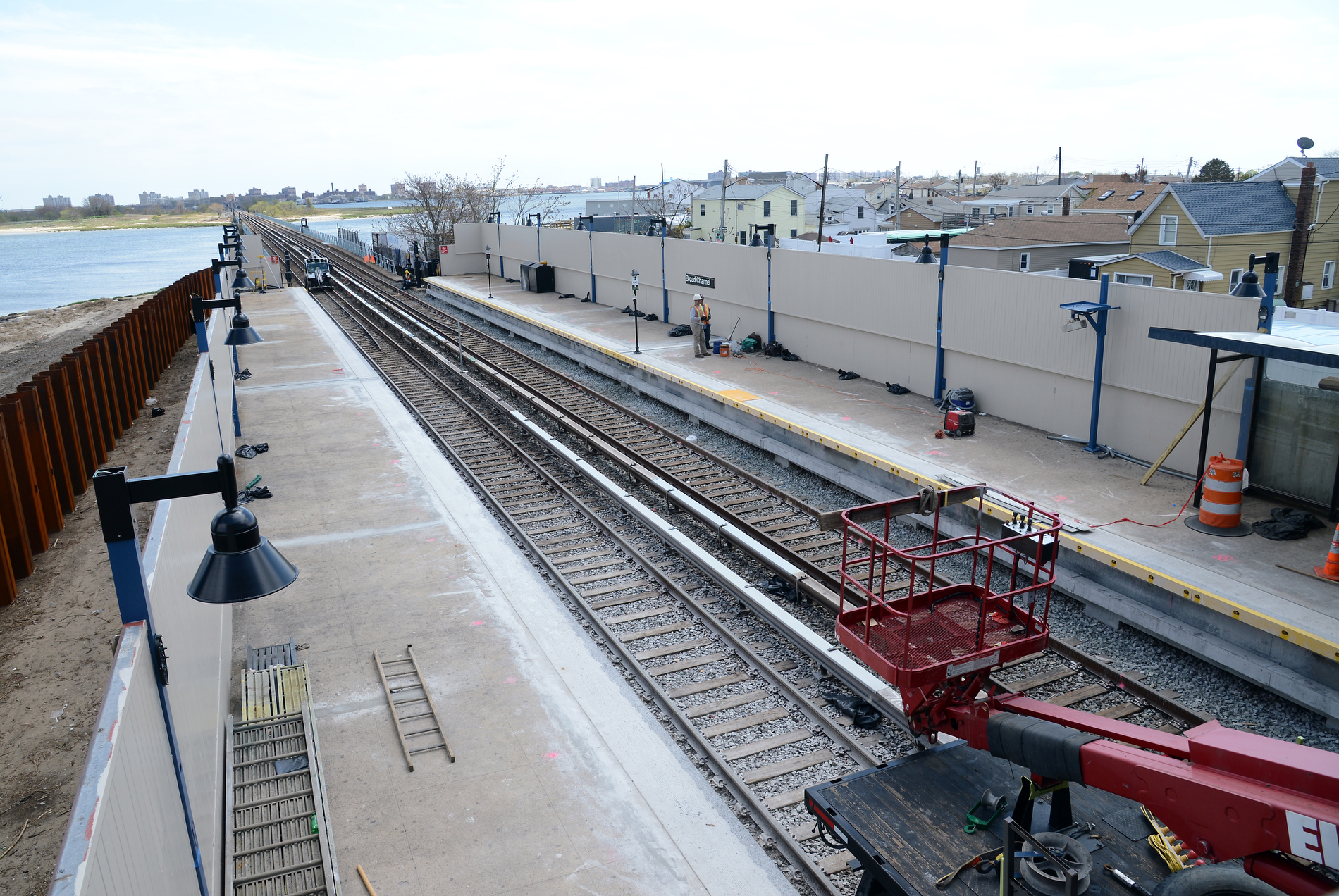
A view of the southern end of the station during the renovation of the line

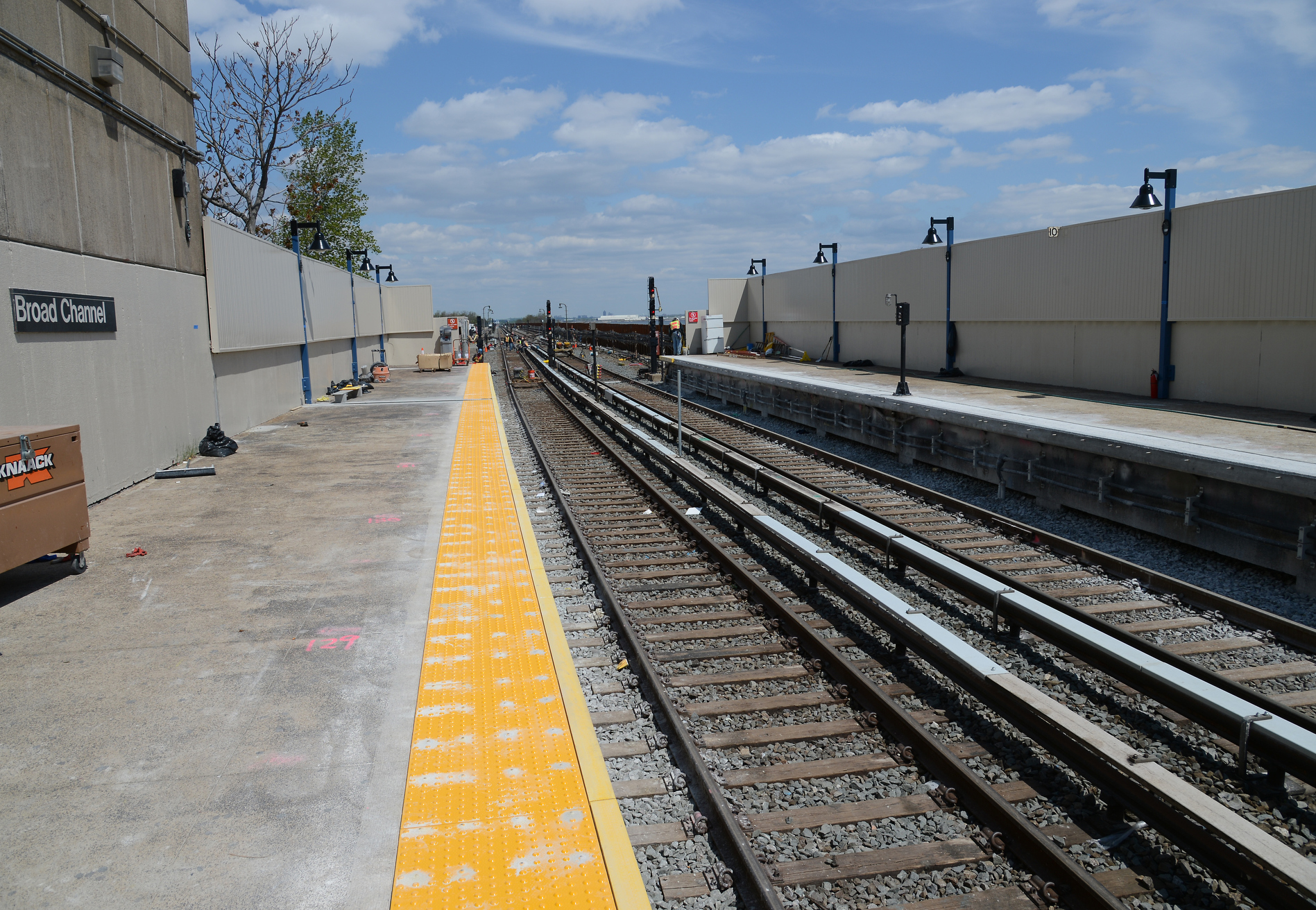
A view of the southbound platform facing to the north, the renovation almost complete

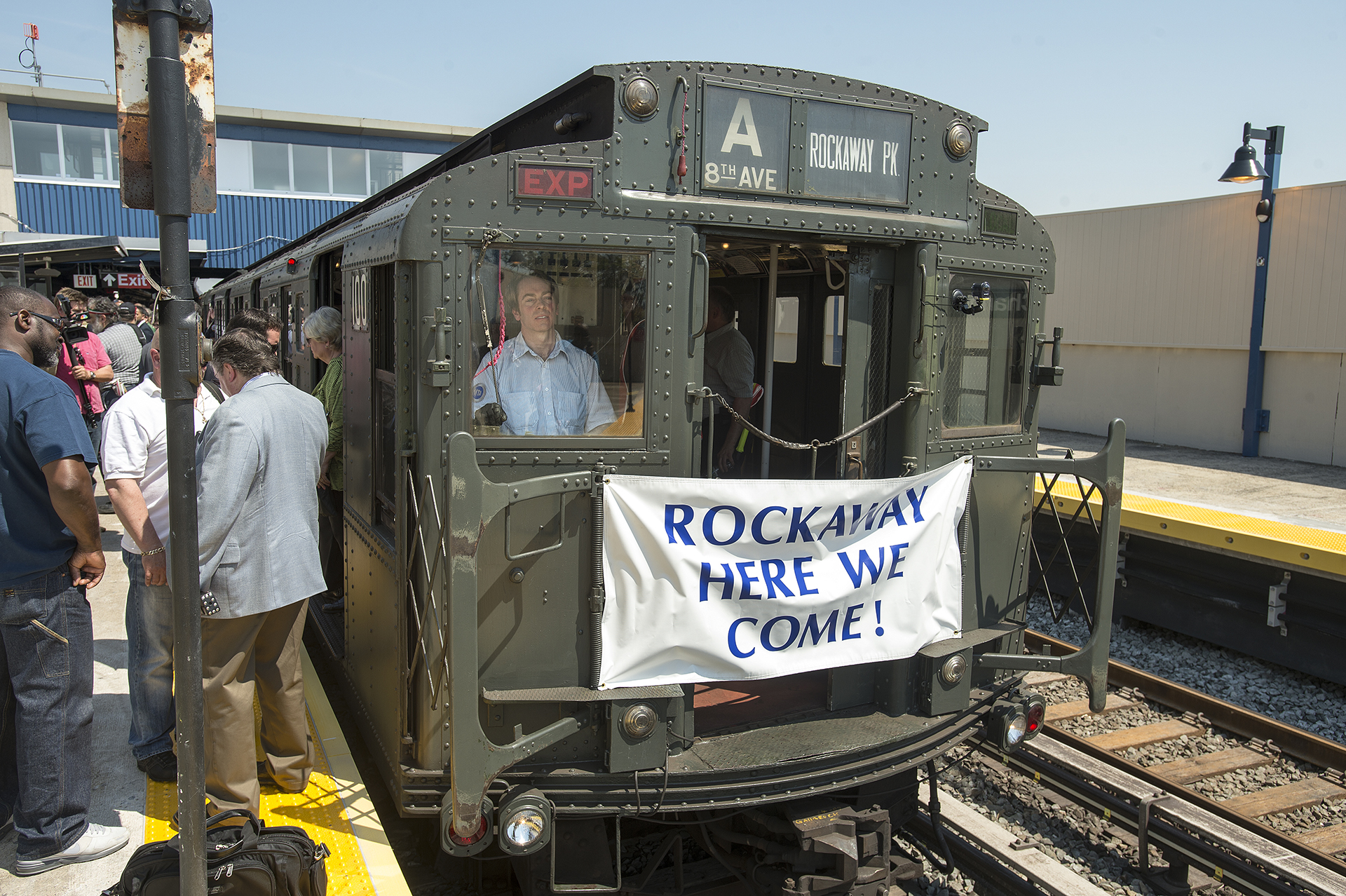
A vintage R1 subway car leading the first trip onto the Rockaway Line on May 30, 2013, after having been closed due to damage from Hurricane Sandy
