= Shirley Huntley =

American politician (born 1938)

Shirley L. Huntley
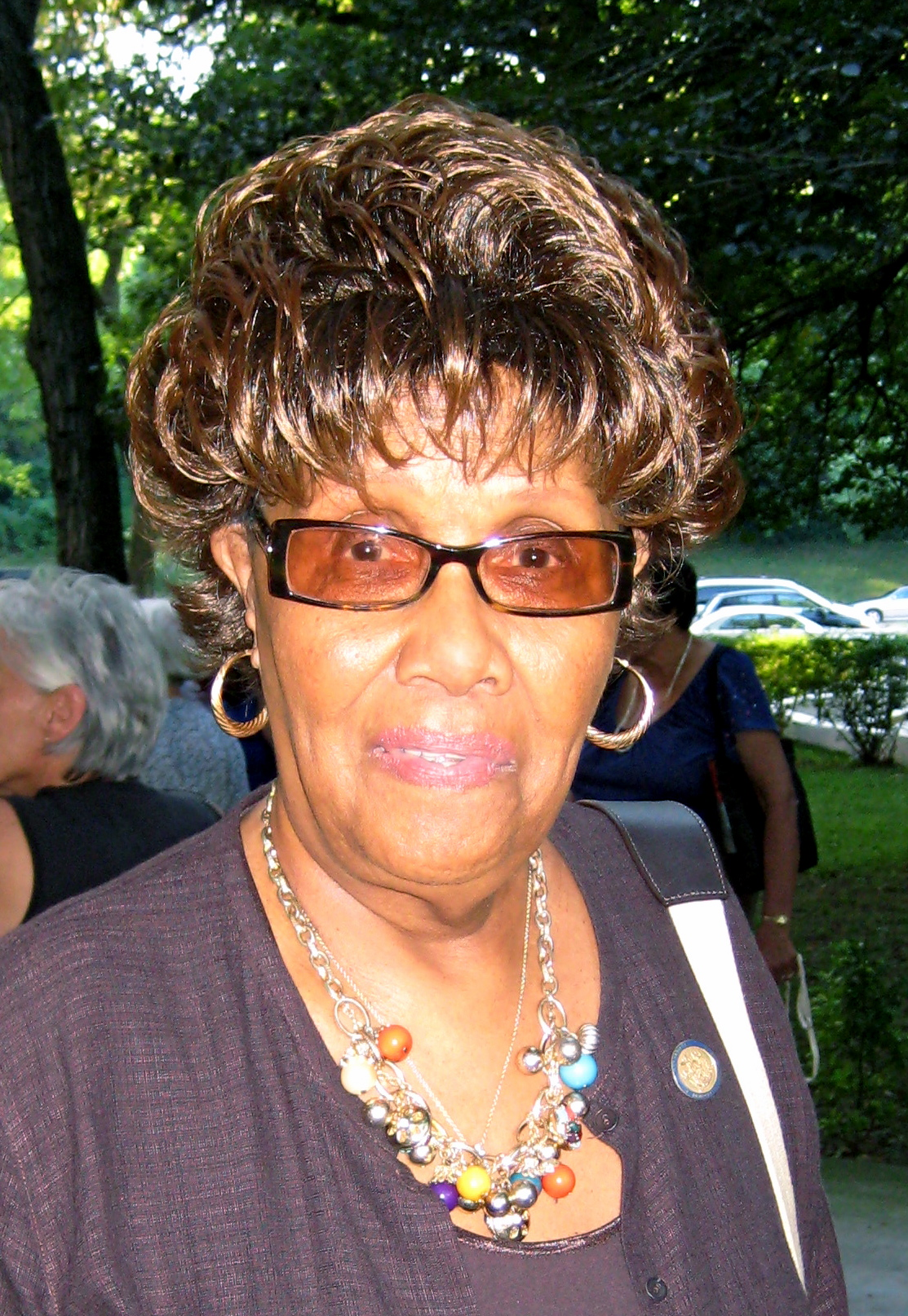

Member of the New York State Senate from the 10th district
- In office January 3, 2007 – January 1, 2013
- Preceded by: Ada Smith
- Succeeded by: James Sanders Jr.

Personal details
- Born: June 29, 1938 (age 88)
- Party: Democratic
- Spouse: Herbert Huntley
- Website: Official website

Shirley L. Huntley (born June 29, 1938) is an American politician who is formerly a New York State Senator, serving from 2007 to 2012. Huntley represented Senate District 10 in Queens County, which included Jamaica, South Jamaica, Springfield Gardens, Laurelton, South Ozone Park, Kew Gardens, Broad Channel, and Lindenwood. She pleaded guilty to mail fraud in 2013.

== Political career ==
Huntley was elected to Community School Board 28 in 1993 and served as its president until the dissolution of the School Board in 2004. She was appointed to the Community Education Council for District 28 in June 2004 and was elected as its president in July 2004.

A Democrat, Huntley defeated then-State Senator Ada Smith in a Democratic primary in 2006. She won the general election that year and took office in 2007.

On December 2, 2009, Huntley was one of eight Democratic state senators to vote against same-sex marriage legislation, which failed to pass the Senate. In June 2011, Huntley came out in support of gay marriage and voted for the Marriage Equality Act.

=== Prosecutions and guilty pleas ===
In May 2011, the New York Post revealed that Huntley was being investigated by the office of the state New York State Attorney General Eric Schneiderman for allegedly running a taxpayer-funded fraudulent charity.

Huntley called an emergency press conference at her home in Jamaica, Queens on August 25, 2012. She revealed that she expected to be arrested on Monday August 27 in the state’s continuing investigation into the use of pork-barrel grants by legislators. Huntley founded a nonprofit social service and education group that was investigated by the Attorney General Schneiderman, and she funded it in part with state grants. Huntley turned herself in to the Nassau County District Attorney's office in Mineola at 7:45 a.m. on August 27, 2012.

On January 30, 2013, Huntley appeared in federal court in Brooklyn and pleaded guilty to one count of conspiracy to commit mail fraud for embezzling $87,000 in state grant funding from the Parent Information Network, a Queens non-profit organization. Huntley later pleaded guilty in state court to a charge of falsifying evidence. She was sentenced to a year and a day in prison on the federal charge.

In May 2013, The New York Times reported that Huntley's "secret recordings of some of New York’s most prominent politicians heightened concerns about widespread corruption in Albany".

== See also ==
- 2009 New York State Senate leadership crisis

New York State Senate
Preceded by Ada Smith	New York State Senate, 10th District; 2007–2013	Succeeded by James Sanders, Jr.
Political offices
Preceded by Thomas Morahan	Chairwoman of the Senate Committee on Mental Health and Developmental Disabilities; January 2009–December 31, 2009	Succeeded by Thomas Morahan
Preceded by Daniel Squadron	Chairwoman of the Senate Committee on Cities; January 2010–December 2010	Succeeded by Andrew Lanza
