= List of National Park System areas in New York =

This is a list of National Park System areas in New York.

New York has 24 service areas included in the United States' National Park Service (NPS) system.

== Current NPS areas ==
	Landmark name	Image	Date established	Location	County	Description
*	Gateway National Recreation Area	Jamaica Bay Coastal Landscapes at Gateway	October 27, 1972			
*	Fire Island National Seashore		September 11, 1964			
*	Upper Delaware Scenic and Recreational River					
*	North Country National Scenic Trail					
*	Castle Clinton National Monument	Castle Clinton in Battery Park (HABS)	August 12, 1946	New York	New York	Circular sandstone fort in Battery Park at the southern tip of Manhattan, New York City
*	Statue of Liberty National Monument		October 15, 1924	Liberty Island	New York	Monument presented to the United States by the people of France in 1886
*	Saratoga National Historical Park		June 1, 1938	Stillwater, Schuylerville and Victory	Saratoga	Site of the 1777 Battle of Saratoga, the first significant American military victory of the American Revolutionary War
*	Women's Rights National Historical Park	Remains of the Wesleyan Chapel.	December 8, 1980	Seneca Falls and Waterloo	Seneca	Established in 1980 in Seneca Falls and nearby Waterloo, New York; includes the Wesleyan Chapel, site of the Seneca Falls Convention, which was the first women's rights convention, and the Elizabeth Cady Stanton House
*	Eleanor Roosevelt National Historic Site	Stone Cottage	May 27, 1977	Hyde Park	Dutchess	Eleanor Roosevelt developed property; place that she could develop some of her ideas for work with winter jobs for rural workers and women; includes a large two-story stuccoed building that housed Val-Kill Industries; would become Eleanor's home after Franklin's death
*	Home of Franklin D. Roosevelt National Historic Site	Front elevation of house	January 15, 1944	Hyde Park	Dutchess	Birthplace, lifelong home, and burial place of the 32nd President of the United States, Franklin Delano Roosevelt
*	Sagamore Hill National Historic Site	Sagamore Hill	July 25, 1962	Cove Neck	Nassau	Home of the 26th President of the United States Theodore Roosevelt from 1886 until his death in 1919
*	Saint Paul's Church National Historic Site		July 5, 1943	Mount Vernon	Westchester	Colonial church used as a military hospital during the American Revolutionary War
*	Theodore Roosevelt Birthplace National Historic Site	The front and entrance of the house.	July 25, 1962	New York	New York	Theodore Roosevelt born on this site on October 27, 1858
*	Theodore Roosevelt Inaugural National Historic Site	Ansley Wilcox House, 1965	November 2, 1966	Buffalo	Erie	Site of Theodore Roosevelt's oath of office as President of the United States on September 14, 1901
*	Vanderbilt Mansion National Historic Site	The severe classicism, perfect balance, and heavy ornamentation of Hyde Park, designed for Frederick Vanderbilt by McKim, Mead & White, is a perfect example of Beaux-Arts architecture.	December 18, 1940	Hyde Park	Dutchess	Includes pleasure grounds with views of the Hudson River and Catskill Mountains, formal gardens, natural woodlands, and numerous support structures as well as a 54-room mansion; completed in 1898; perfect example of the Beaux-Arts architecture style
*	Federal Hall National Memorial		May 26, 1939	New York	New York	First capitol of the United States of America; site of George Washington's first inauguration in 1789; place where the United States Bill of Rights passed; original building was demolished in the nineteenth century; replaced by the current structure, that served as the first United States customs house
*	General Grant National Memorial	Grant's tomb 2004	April 27, 1897	New York	New York	Mausoleum containing the bodies of Ulysses S. Grant (1822–1885), an American Civil War General and the 18th President of the United States, and his wife, Julia Dent Grant (1826–1902)
*	Thomas Cole House Thomas Cole National Historic Site		June 23, 1965	Catskill 42.226372°N 73.862007°W	Greene	Home and studio of painter Thomas Cole, founder of the Hudson River School of American painting
*	Fort Stanwix Fort Stanwix National Monument		November 23, 1962	Rome 43.218611°N 75.458889°W	Oneida	Modern reconstruction of colonial fort on original site
*	Lindenwald Martin Van Buren National Historic Site		July 4, 1961	Kinderhook 42.369706°N 73.704206°W	Columbia	Home of U.S. President Martin Van Buren; designed in part by Richard Upjohn
*	Kate Mullany House		April 1, 1998	Troy 42.7399°N 73.681803°W	Rensselaer	Home of Kate Mullany, early female labor organizer andfounder of Collar Laundry Union
*	African Burial Ground African Burial Ground National Monument		Apr 19, 1993	Manhattan 40.714558°N 74.004384°W	New York	Dedicated as National Monument on October 5, 2007; burial site in Lower Manhattan of over 400 Africans from the 17th and 18th centuries
*	Governors Island Governors Island National Monument		Feb 4, 1985	Manhattan	New York	Island in NY Harbor which served various branches of the US Military from 1783 until the late 1990s; future uses are still being decided
*	Hamilton Grange National Memorial		Dec 19, 1960	Manhattan	New York	Home of Alexander Hamilton: military officer, lawyer, member of the United States Constitutional Convention, American statesman, first United States Secretary of the Treasury, and Founding Father; facade is oldest surviving structure in Manhattan

== Former NPS areas ==
There are some former designations in New York. (development needed)

== See also ==
- List of National Park System areas in Maryland
