= James Sanders Jr. =

American politician (born 1957)

James Sanders
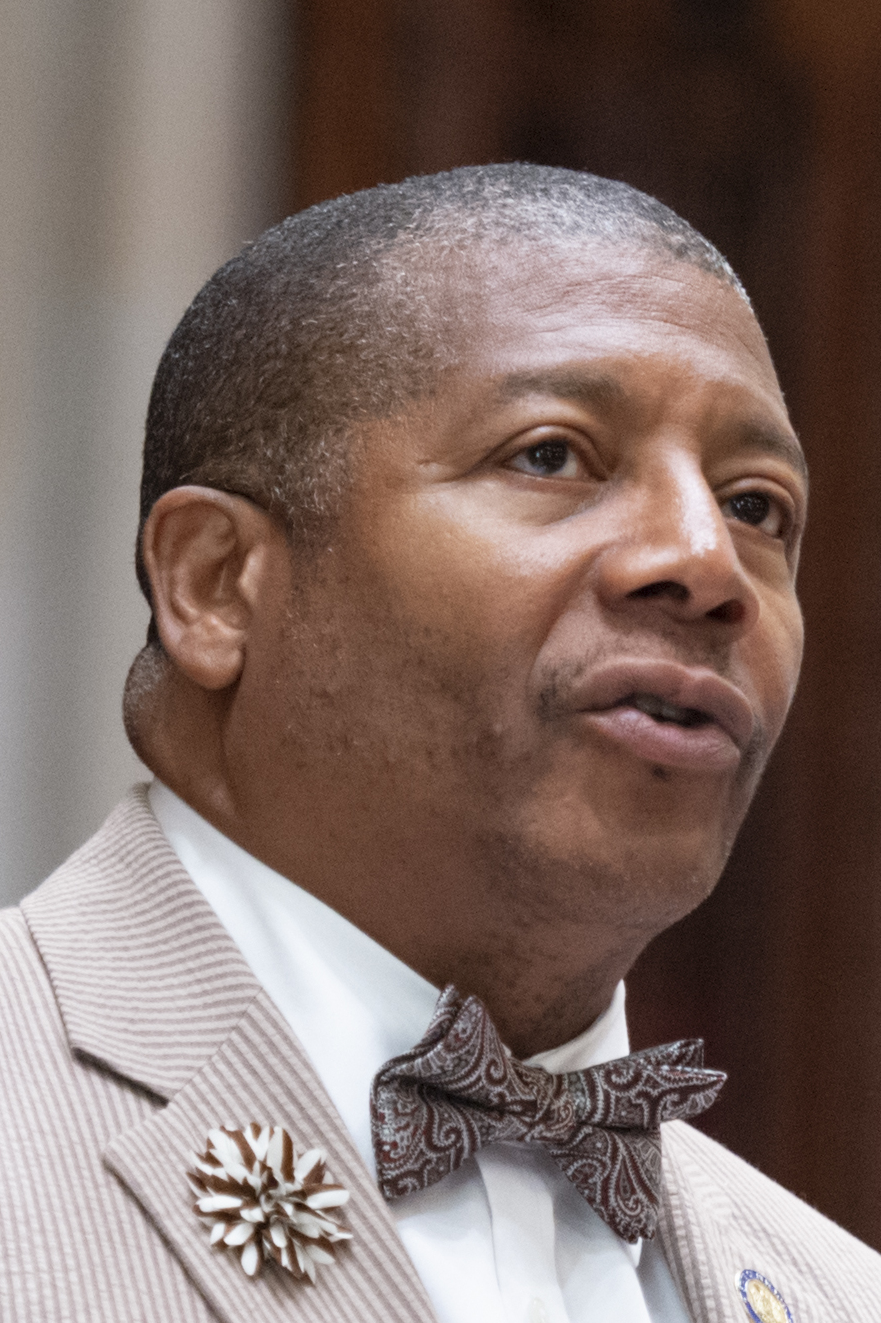

Member of the New York State Senate from the 10th district
- Incumbent
- Assumed office January 1, 2013
- Preceded by: Shirley Huntley

Member of the New York City Council from the 31st district
- In office January 1, 2002 – January 1, 2013
- Preceded by: Juanita Watkins
- Succeeded by: Donovan Richards

Personal details
- Born: August 14, 1957 (age 69) Far Rockaway, New York, U.S.
- Party: Democratic
- Spouse: Andrea Stevenson
- Education: Brooklyn College (BA)
- Website: State Senate website

James Sanders Jr. (born 1957) is a member of the New York State Senate, serving since January 2013. He represents the 10th district, which includes the Queens neighborhoods of Richmond Hill, South Ozone Park, Jamaica, Rochdale Village, Rosedale and parts of Far Rockaway.

== Early life and education ==
Sanders was born at the Hammel Houses in Far Rockaway. He attended public schools throughout the Rockaways then attended Brooklyn College. Sanders served as a Marine. He married Andrea Stevenson.

== Career ==
In 2001, Sanders won election to the 31st district of the New York City Council in an underdog win against powerful candidates James Blake and Charlotte Jefferson. Blake had received the support of incumbent councilwoman Juanita Watkins. On the council, Sanders was the first African-American to sit as Chair of the Economic Development Committee'. In July 2009, Sanders was reported to have shown up for only 61% of City Council meetings for fiscal year 2009, the second-fewest on the list. However, he has attributed this to the near fatal car crash that he had in the fall of 2008 which also injured his staffers, Donovan Richards and Mike Duvall.

In 2009, he was challenged for reelection from candidates Michael Duncan, Jacques Leandre, and Frederick Lewis. He was re-elected with 40% of the vote, with his next leading opponent, Jacques Leandre, receiving 19%. He was succeeded in the council seat by his former District Manager Donovan Richards, the Queens Borough President as of 2025.

In early 2007, Sanders endorsed then-Senator Barack Obama for President and traveled to Pennsylvania, Ohio, and South Carolina to campaign for him. He became an Obama delegate and represented his district at the Democratic National Convention in Denver. In 2015, Sanders endorsed Senator Bernie Sanders for President of the United States in the 2016 Democratic primaries and the 2016 general election. He endorsed Bernie Sanders again for the 2020 Primary.

=== New York Senate ===
In 2012, Sanders, who would have been term-limited in the City Council and unable to run again in 2013, opted to primary Senator Shirley Huntley, who was facing corruption charges. He would go on to win with 56% of the vote, winning the general election unopposed. He has been unopposed in the general election ever since.

In December 2015, Sanders filed papers to challenge Congressman Gregory Meeks in the Democratic primary for New York's 5th congressional district. However, he dropped out of the race in March 2016, accusing Meeks of leaking information to the New York Post about a Federal Bureau of Investigation probe into Sanders' use of slush funds and alleged solicitation of a $250,000 kickback from a non-profit. Sanders was never charged with any wrongdoing, and he successfully ran for reelection to his Senate seat despite the Queens Democratic Party backing an opponent, Adrienne Adams.

When Democrats took control of the state senate in 2019, Sanders was named chair of the Committee on Banks.

In 2019, Sanders introduced a resolution to recognize October 1, the National Day of the People's Republic of China, as "China Day" in New York State. The resolution in the state senate was attended by China's counsel general for New York State, Huang Ping, who praised it.

== Personal life ==
In 2005, he married his former chief of staff. He has two children from a previous marriage.
