= Remington Vernam (land developer) =

American lawyer and real-estate developer

Remington Vernam (January 1843 – July 3, 1907) was an American lawyer and real-estate developer from New York, best known for founding and developing the community of Arverne, which became part of New York City in 1898, from land he had purchased in 1882.

The name of Arverne was derived by his wife, Florence, who noted that her husband signed his checks as "R. Vernam".

Vernam was born in Mechanicville, New York.

== Legacy ==
- Public School 42, located at Beach 66th Street and Thursby Avenue, is officially named the "R. Vernam School" in his honor.
- Vernam Basin, an industrial waterway in Jamaica Bay at Arverne, is also named in his honor.
- Two former Long Island Rail Road stations were also named for his signature, both of which are now subway stations on the IND Rockaway Line.
