= Jamaica Bay Wildlife Refuge =

Wildlife refuge in New York City

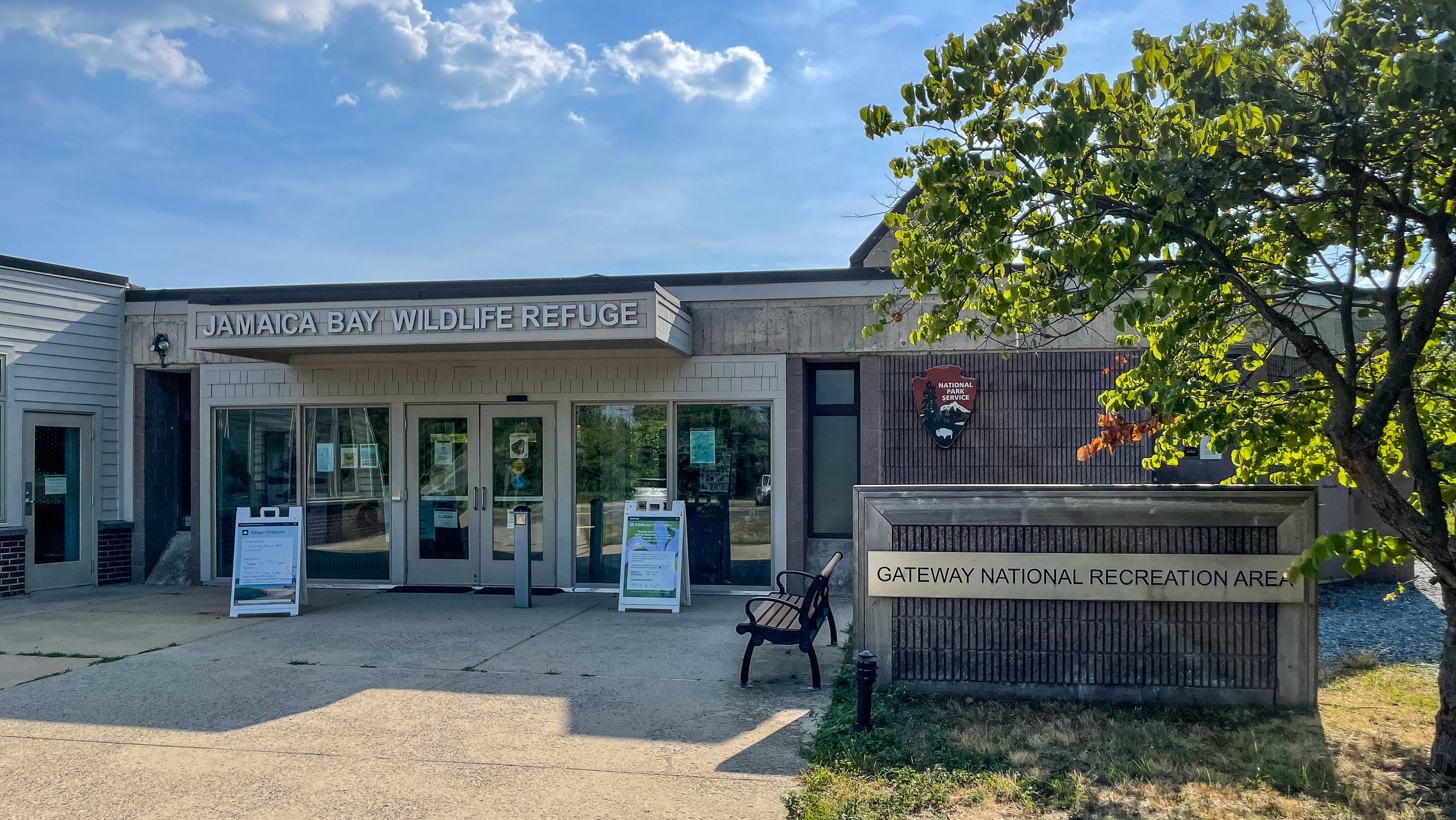
- Visitor center

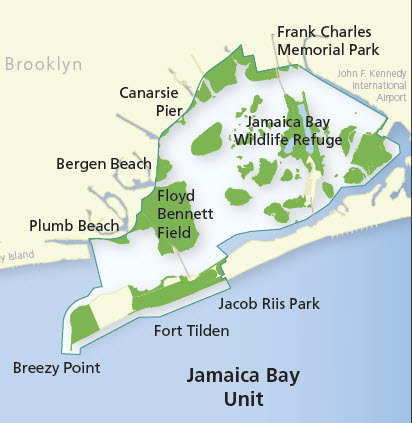
- Jamaica Bay Unit of the Gateway National Recreation Area
- Location: New York City, United States
- Coordinates: 40°36′57″N 73°49′48″W
- Area: 9,155 acres (37.05 km^{2})
- Established: 1972
- Governing body: National Park Service
- Website: Jamaica Bay Wildlife Refuge

Jamaica Bay Wildlife Refuge is a wildlife refuge in New York City managed by the National Park Service as part of Gateway National Recreation Area. It is composed of the open water and intertidal salt marshes and wetlands of Jamaica Bay. It lies entirely within the boundaries of New York City, divided between the boroughs of Brooklyn to the west and Queens to the east.

== Description ==
Jamaica Bay Wildlife Refuge consists of several islands in Jamaica Bay, located in both Brooklyn and Queens. The Queens portion is located near John F. Kennedy International Airport, which was built upon a portion of the wetlands in Jamaica Bay. In April 1942, the City of New York started placing hydraulic fill over the marshy tidelands of the area. JFK International Airport is now the sixth busiest airport in the United States, and the aviation traffic may pose some serious noise pollutant threats to the surrounding environment.

The extent of the refuge is mostly open water, but includes upland shoreline and islands with salt marsh, dunes, brackish ponds, woodland and fields. It is the only "wildlife refuge" in the National Park System. Originally created and managed by New York City as a wildlife refuge, the term was retained by Gateway when the site was transferred in 1972. Usually, federal wildlife refuges are managed by the U.S. Fish and Wildlife Service. Features created under city ownership include two large freshwater ponds. A visitor center with a parking lot provides free permits to walk the trails. The two main trails go around the East Pond and the West Pond. The West Pond and its trail, however, were breached by Hurricane Sandy in 2012.

== Fauna ==
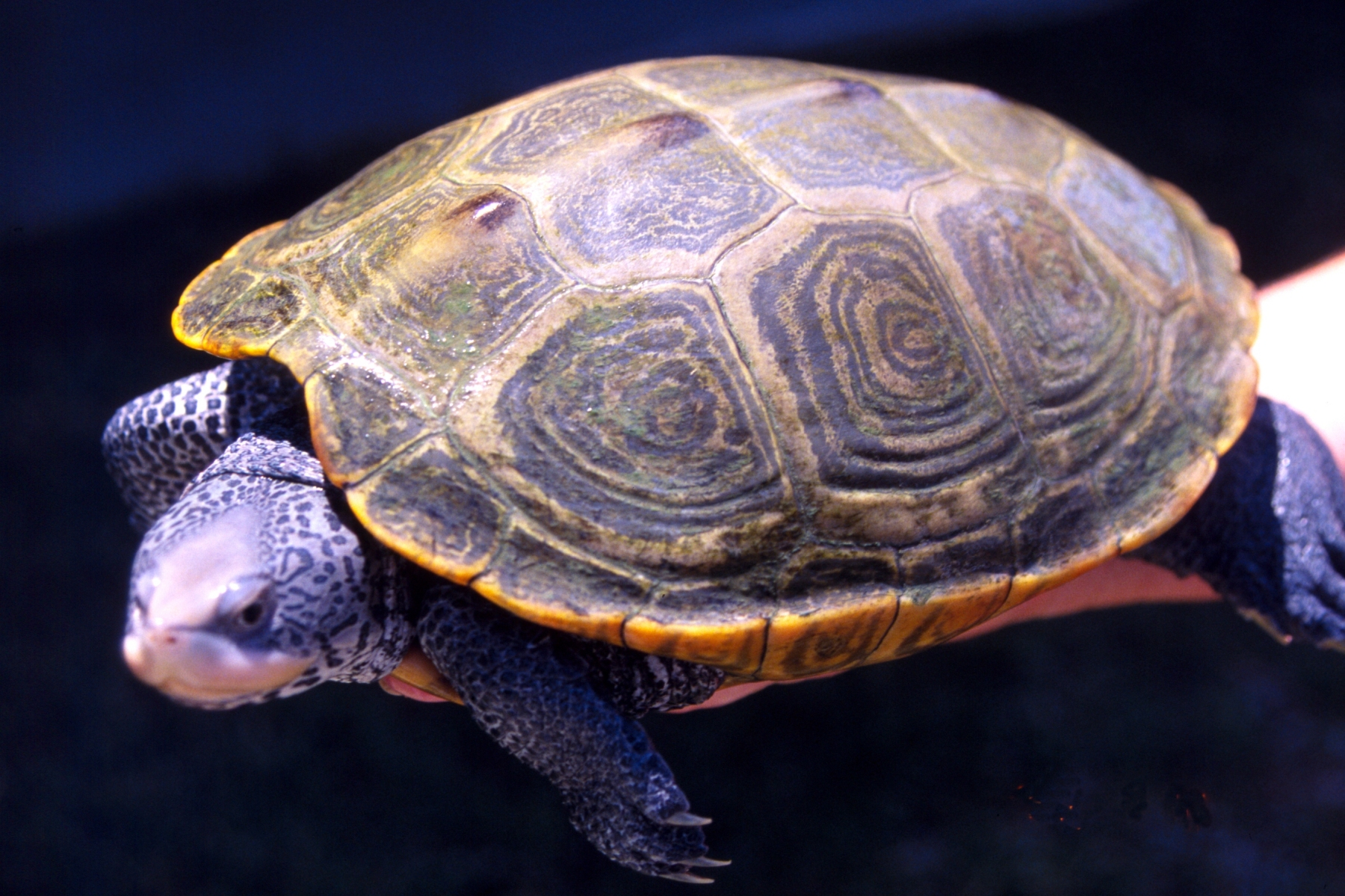
Adult female diamondback terrapin

The refuge provides habitat for a wide variety of flora and fauna, both marine and terrestrial. With resident and migratory birds, it is a prime location for birding in New York City. Other animal activities include diamondback terrapin egg laying and horseshoe crab mating and egg laying. The primary diet of the diamondback terrapins include fish, snails, worms, clams, crabs and marsh plants, many of which are abundant in these particular marshlands. Ospreys, which were at one time endangered due to the pesticide DDT, have regularly nested in the refuge since 1991. They are currently being captured, tagged and studied in the Wildlife Refuge to help scientists better understand the birds' habits. Small mammals such as eastern gray squirrels and raccoons are also present in the area. The recently increased raccoon population, however, has developed a taste for diamondback terrapin eggs, and many nests are often destroyed only 24 hours after being laid.

== History ==
1970s

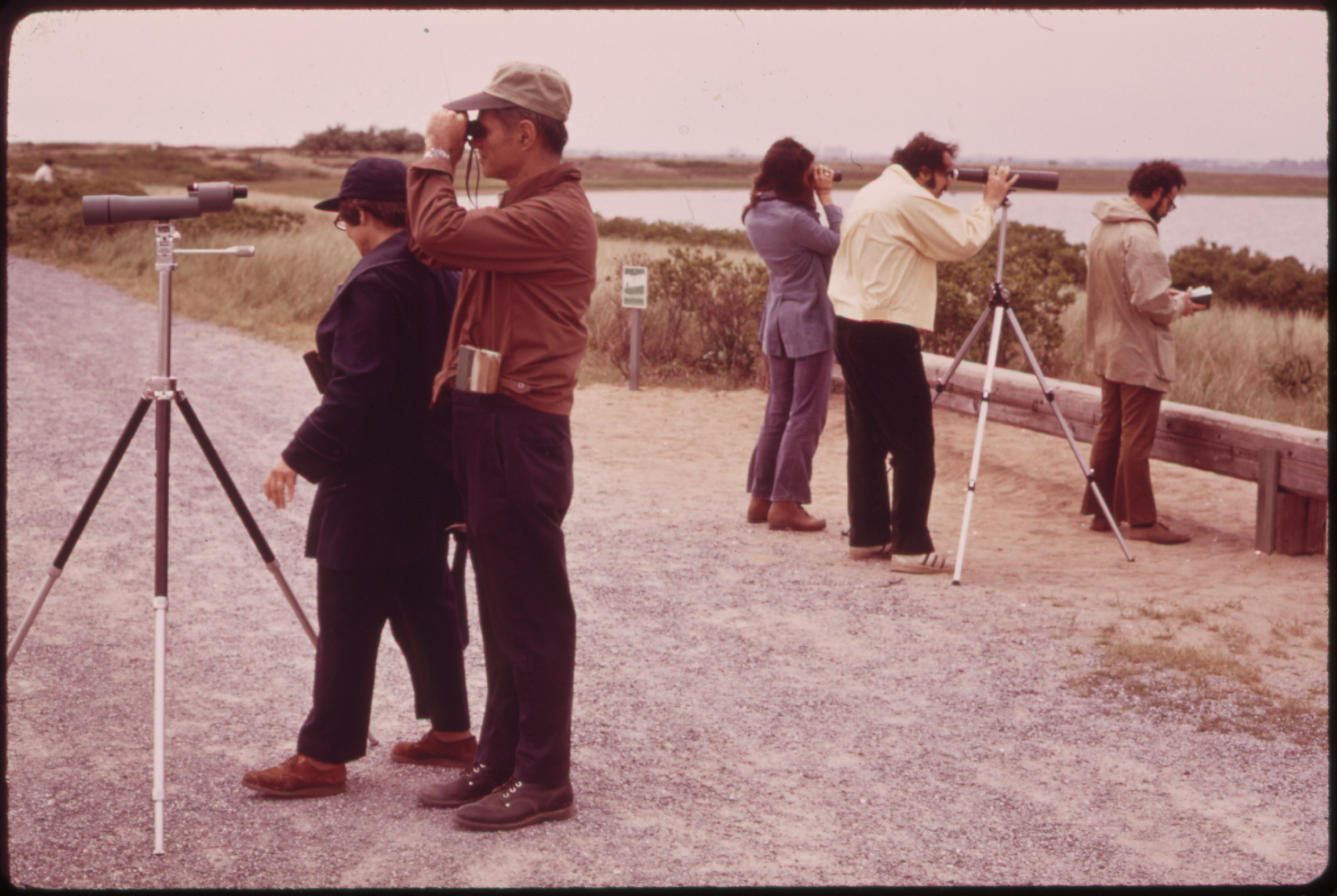
Birdwatching, June 1973

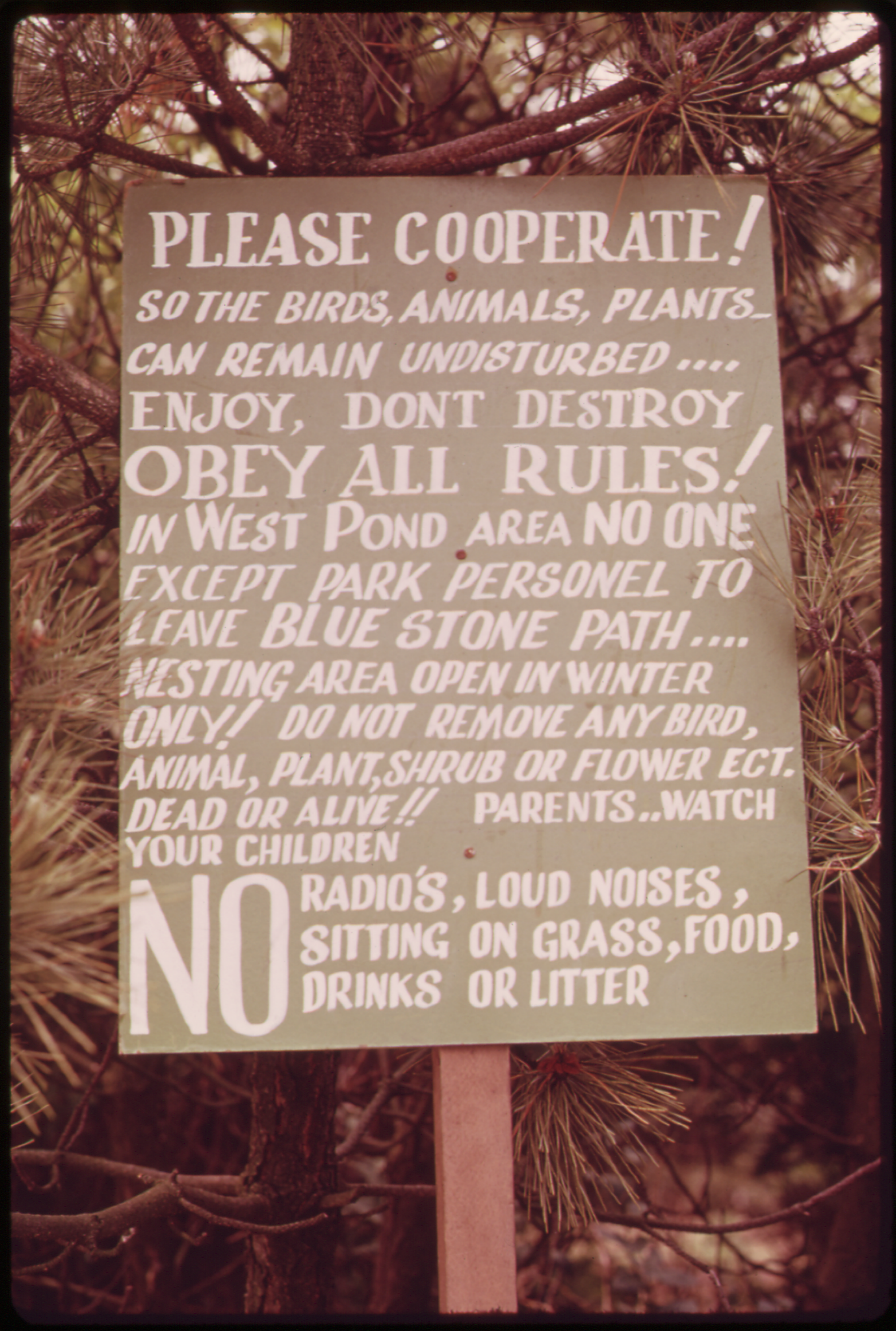
Conservation sign circa 1973

Planning of the wildlife refuge started as early as 1938 by New York City Department of Parks and Recreation (NYC Parks) commissioner Robert Moses, who wished to rezone the area around Jamaica Bay to prevent any more industries from being built around it. By 1941, Moses planned to convert Jamaica Bay into a 18,000-acre (7,300 ha) recreation center. In 1945, he asked the New York City Board of Estimate to transfer control of Jamaica Bay to NYC Parks so he could convert the bay into what The New York Times described as "a haven for wild life and a mecca for fishermen and boating enthusiasts". After about twelve years of planning, Moses broke ground on the park in 1950.

Moses is credited for introducing the idea of creating nonindigenous freshwater ponds on each side of the refuge. Having freshwater ponds in proximity of the bay's saltwater marshland would attract more varieties of wildlife. About 84,000 workers were employed for the development of the park.

=== Early years ===
The first phase of the project was completed in 1953, and Herbert Johnson was appointed as the refuge's first superintendent. The site quickly became a haven for waterfowl and other birds; 208 species of birds were identified in the park's first five years. The refuge attracted species such as black skimmers and snowy egrets, which had not been seen in the New York City area in several decades. Other wildlife such as black bears, coyotes, elk, and even eastern wolves could be found in the park during the early years. Many birdwatchers had begun visiting the park by the late 1950s.

Control of the site passed in 1972 to the National Park Service, which administers the refuge as part of the Gateway National Recreation Area.

=== 21st century ===
2020s

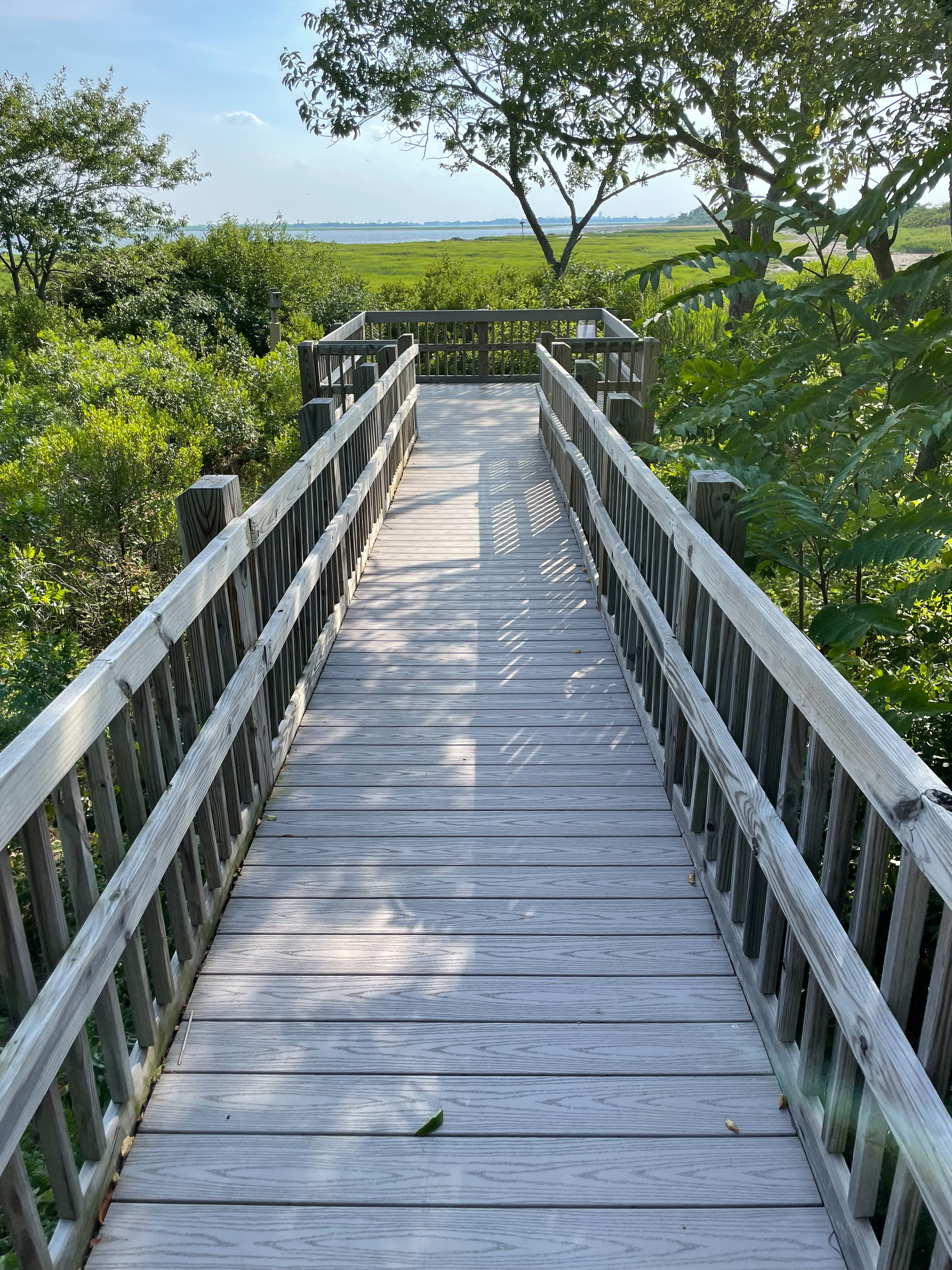
Marsh overlook platform

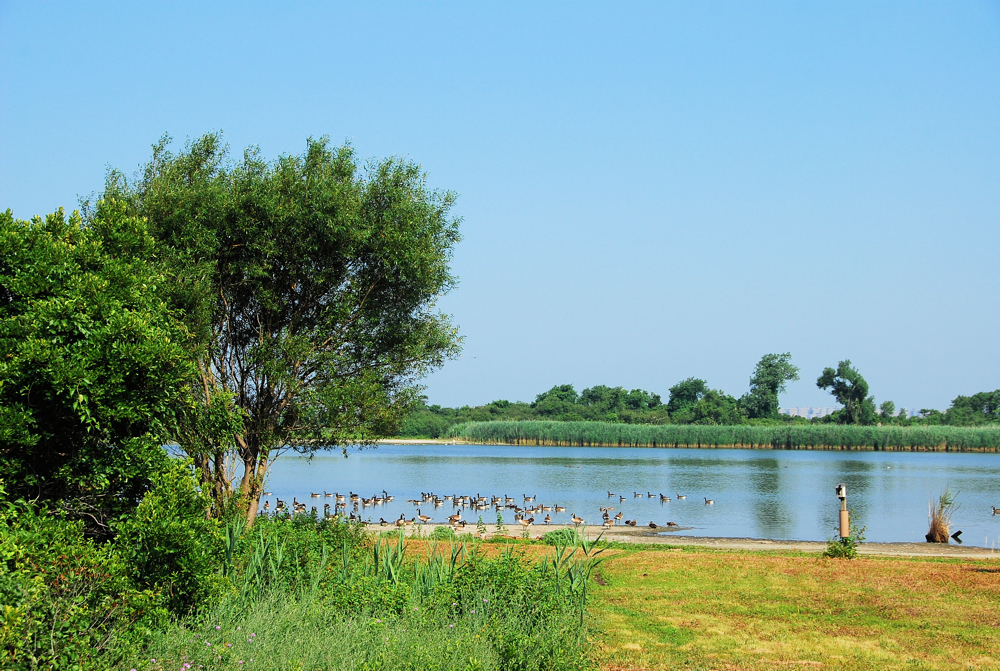
West Pond

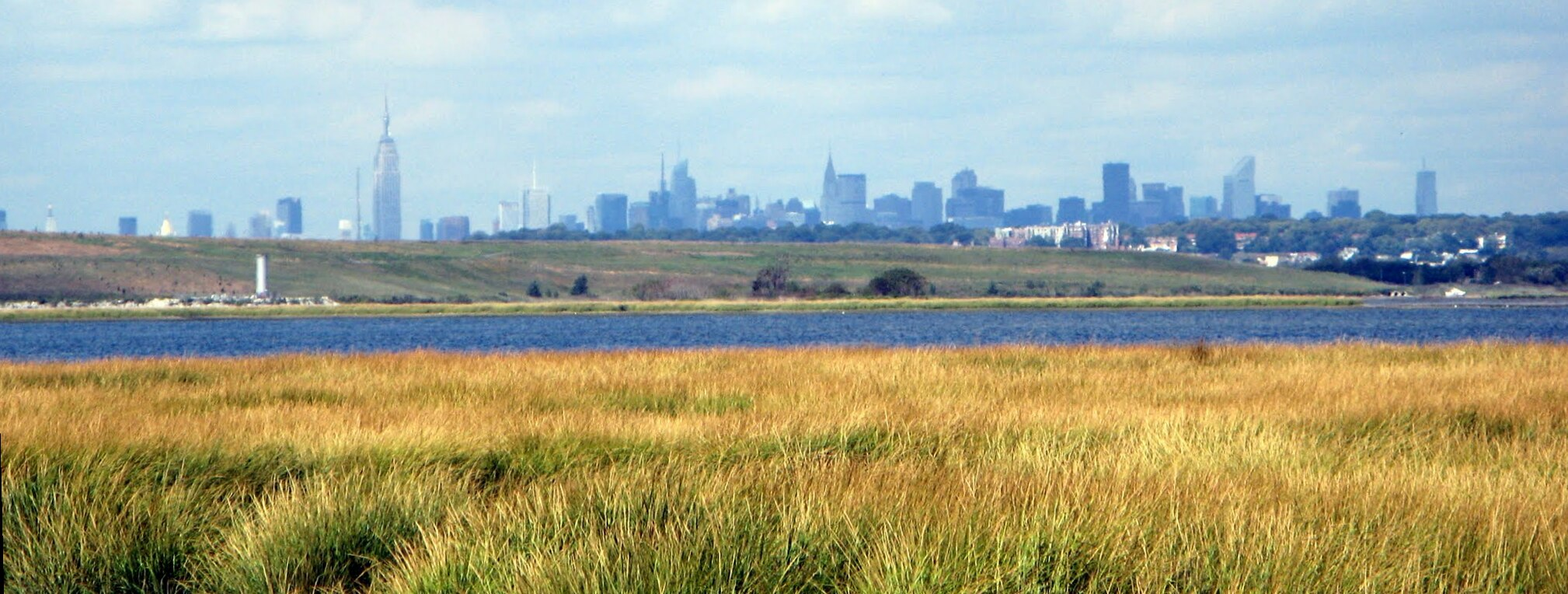
Manhattan skyline viewed from Jamaica Bay

As a result of climate change, the Jamaica Bay area faces effects such as salt marsh erosion, rising sea levels, and flooding. In 2012, Mayor Michael R. Bloomberg and Secretary of the Interior Ken Salazar authorized the creation of the Jamaica Bay-Rockaway Parks Conservancy, Inc. (JBRPC). The public-private organization was officially established in 2013, partners with the National Park Service, the New York City Department of Parks and Recreation and the New York State Department of Parks, Recreation and Historic Preservation, and is "dedicated to improving the 10,000 acres of public parkland throughout Jamaica Bay and the Rockaway peninsula for local residents and visitors alike." Other organizations dedicated to the preservation of the bay include Jamaica Bay Ecowatchers and The American Littoral Society.

In 2016, David Sigal and David Hendrick released the documentary Saving Jamaica Bay, narrated by actress Susan Sarandon. The film portrays the history of the national wildlife refuge and current efforts to preserve the natural landscape and wildlife.

In 2018, it was estimated that 365 species have been identified in the park. Out of 417 U.S. national parks, Jamaica Bay ranks second in bird population, higher than Yellowstone or Yosemite.

A $400 million restoration project was begun in 2018 to combat erosion and pollution, remove maritime debris, and clean up storm damage remaining from Hurricane Sandy. The West Pond Loop at the Jamaica Bay Wildlife Refuge reopened in November 2021 after a restoration.

== See also ==
- List of National Park System areas in New York
