= Arverne, Queens =

Neighborhood in New York City

Arverne
- Neighborhood of Queens
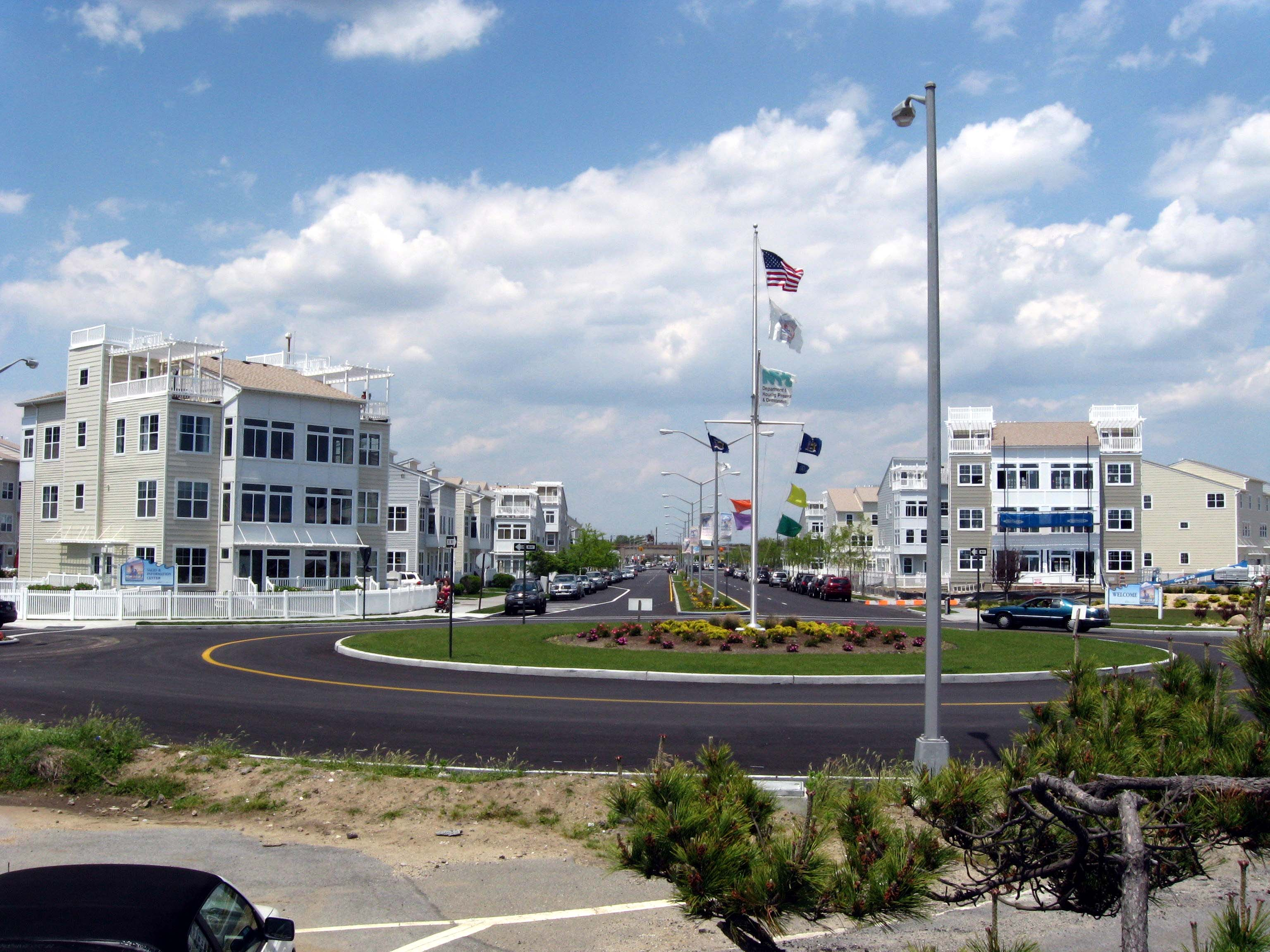
- Arverne-by-the-Sea development
- Interactive map of Arverne
- Coordinates: 40.59°N 73.795°W
- Country: United States
- State: New York
- City: New York City
- County/Borough: Queens
- Community District: Queens 14
- Named for: "R. Vernam", the signature of Remington Vernam

Population (2024)
  - Total: 22,734
  - Density: 22,379.4/sq mi (8,640.7/km^{2})

Race and Ethnicity
  - Black: 55.81%
  - Hispanic (Note: Hispanic includes respondents of any race. Other categories are non-Hispanic.): 23.18%
  - White: 9.96%
  - Asian: 6.58%
  - Multiracial: 4.44%

Economics
  - Median household income: $49,720
  - Per capita income: $32,251
- Time zone: UTC−5 (EST)
  - Summer (DST): UTC−4 (EDT)
- ZIP Code: 11692
- Area codes: 718, 347, 929, and 917

Arverne is a neighborhood in the New York City borough of Queens, on the Rockaway Peninsula. It was initially developed by Remington Vernam, whose signature "R. Vernam" inspired the name of the neighborhood. Arverne extends from Beach 54th Street to Beach 79th Street, along its main thoroughfare Beach Channel Drive, alternatively known as Rev. Joseph H. May Drive.

Arverne is located in Queens Community District 14 and its ZIP Code is 11692. It is patrolled by the New York City Police Department's 100th Precinct.

== History ==
=== Original settlement ===
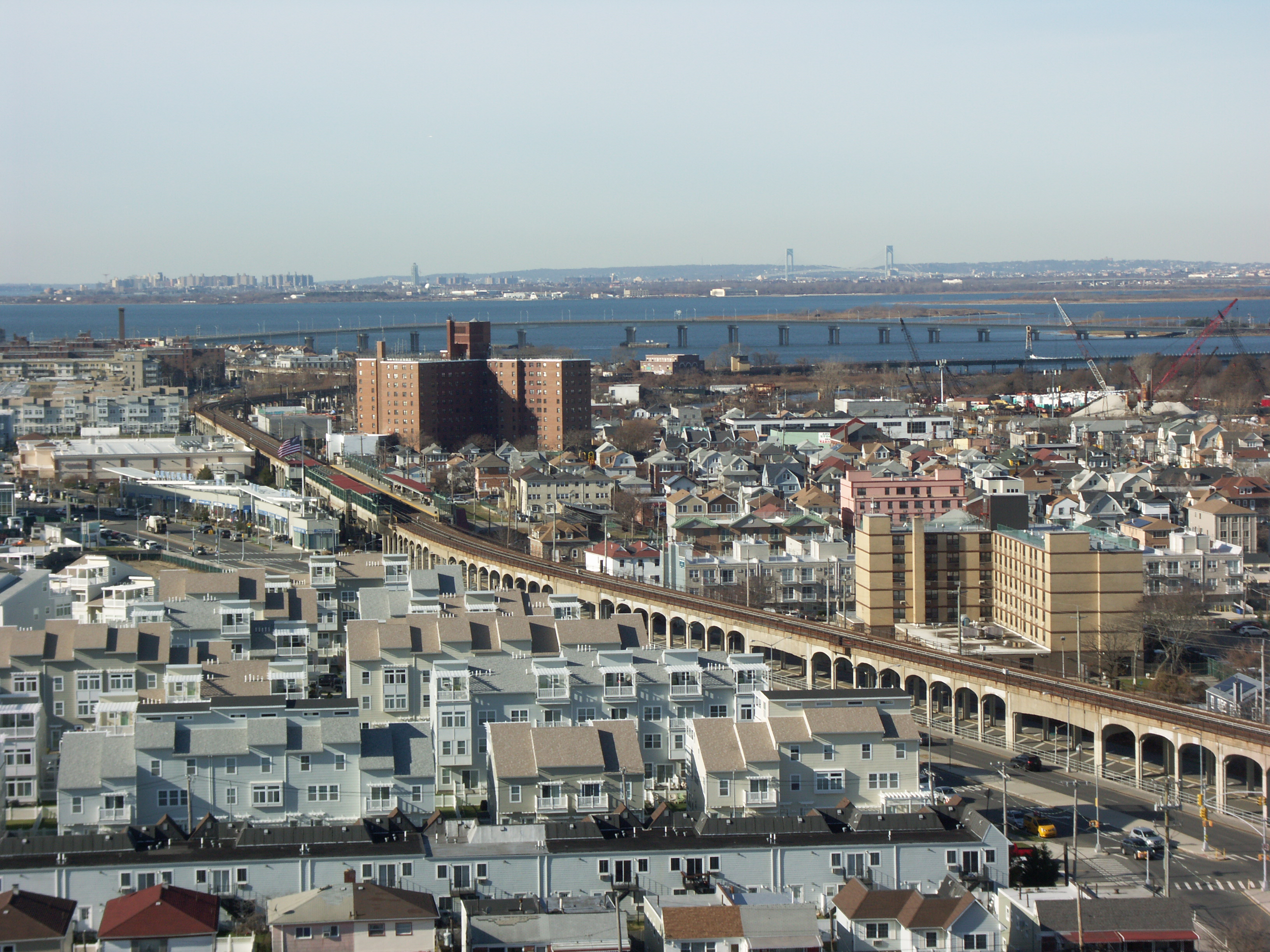
Overhead view of Arverne

Vernam's original plan was to name the neighborhood Arverne-by-the-Sea. One grandiose plan, influenced by his wife Florence, included a canal running through the neighborhood, reminiscent of the Amstel canal in Amsterdam, the Netherlands. When this plan fell through, the canal right-of-way was converted into a thoroughfare, Amstel Boulevard, which, except for a stub west of Beach 71st Street, was later incorporated into Beach Channel Drive.

Located on the Rockaway Boardwalk, Arverne became well known as a beachfront community with inexpensive summer bungalows, hotels of varying expense and luxury, and amusements and boardwalk concessions. It also attracted year-round residents. On January 3, 1914, a storm devastated the peninsula's neighborhoods and swept the 1,200-seat Arverne Pier Theater out to sea. On June 15, 1922, a fire leveled a large part of Arverne, leaving about 10,000 people homeless, although the neighborhood was quick to rebuild. In 1928, a project to build 5,000 bungalows in Arverne was announced.

=== Decline ===
During the 1950s and 1960s, the advent of commercial jet air travel encouraged people to travel to distant destinations during the summer, rather than to local beaches and resorts. As a result, many of Arverne's summer bungalows became vacant. New York City's urban renewal projects of the 1960s leveled most of the summer resorts and some of the residences, many of which had been abandoned.

In 1964, the New York City Planning Commission approved the designation of a 302-acre (122 ha) Arverne renewal area. Two years later, the renewal area was expanded by 19 blocks. In expectation of the upcoming urban renewal, vacant bungalows were demolished. However, the renewal project was delayed, and a grand jury was convened to find the causes of the delay. A gap in funding from the U.S. federal government contributed to pressures to cancel the redevelopment. In 1970, the city announced it would develop 970 apartments in Arverne by 1972. By then, only about 100 of the original 900 bungalows remained. Controversy later arose when the city decided to place 100 mobile homes instead of permanent housing for low-income Puerto Ricans. By 1973, Mayor John Lindsay was calling for 500 of 3,650 proposed housing units to be deleted from the Arverne redevelopment plan. As of yet, the 970 apartments in Arverne had not been developed.

When the city re-opened Arverne to redevelopment in 1984, a 123-acre (50 ha) patch of Arverne only contained one structure: PS 106. In 1988, the administration of mayor Ed Koch started asking private developers to build on the site. The Dubos Point Wildlife Sanctuary was designated that year as part of the plans for redevelopment. By 1991, the plans called for the construction of 7,500 apartments over 10 years at a cost of $1.5 billion. Finally, the late 1990s saw construction begin on a 322-unit development of two-family houses, the first such development in the 35-year-old Arverne renewal area. The rest of the area's redevelopment was canceled after an economic downturn in the 1990s. People started dumping garbage in Dubos Point, to the consternation of residents. In 2003, The New York Times wrote:

For nearly four decades, grand plans were offered for the 52-block stretch from Beach 32nd to 84th Streets, between Rockaway Beach Boulevard and the boardwalk. [There was to be] a phalanx of mid- and high-rise condominium and rental apartment buildings, [as well as] more than $1 billion... enclosed amusement area on the Arverne site, to be called Destination Technodome, with rides, movie theaters, an indoor ski slope and a hotel.

=== Redevelopment ===
In the early 2000s, Mayor Michael Bloomberg started to revitalize Arverne with new housing and parks. This built upon a movement started in 1999, when 40 houses were built in the portion of the Arverne renewal area between Beach 59th and 61st Streets.

As of 2003, 97 acres (39 ha) of the "Edgemere Urban Renewal Area" was to have 400 houses built within it. Of these, 47 acres (19 ha) would be houses, 35 acres (14 ha) would be a nature preserve, and 15 acres (6.1 ha) would be a segment of preserved dunes on the beach.

Arverne and other parts of the Rockaways increasingly got attention and press as the redevelopment of the beachfront continued. To improve pedestrian accessibility, a section of Rockaway Freeway beneath the station was closed to through traffic and the Beach 67th Street–Gaston Avenue station was renamed Beach 67th Street–Arverne by the Sea as a symbolic recognition of the neighborhood's rebirth as a residential area and a summer waterfront destination.

One of the largest developments, the 2,300-unit Arverne by the Sea, first opened to residents in 2006. Despite an economic downturn in 2008, the $1 billion development was mostly successful, and units sold at prices of up to $1 million. By 2012, Arverne by the Sea was largely developed. New restaurants and retail establishments arrived as part of an effort to make shopping available to local residents at a hub near the Beach 67th Street station. Phase I was completed in 2011; Phase II was begun in 2006.

In October 2018, construction began on the Tides development. By mid-2019, Arverne was undergoing gentrification as new businesses were opening in the area, which was still over 60% Black and 20% Hispanic/Latino. According to census data from the 2019 American Community Survey, the Black population declined as a percentage of the population to 56.8%.

== Education ==
The New York City Department of Education operates Arverne's public schools. These schools include PS/MS 42 Robert Vernam School and PS 183 Dr. Richard R. Green.

The Queens Public Library operates the Arverne branch at 312 Beach 54th Street.

== Housing ==
- NYCHA
  - Ocean Bay Houses (Oceanside), formerly Arverne Houses,
  - Ocean Bay Houses (Bayside), formerly Edgemere Houses,
  - Carleton Manor
- Mitchell-Lama
  - Nordeck Apartments (co-operative)
- DHCR

== Transportation ==
The New York City Subway's Beach 67th Street and Beach 60th Street stations, served by the A train, are located in Arverne. The Q22, Q52 SBS, QM15 and QM17 MTA Bus routes also serve the neighborhood.

== Parks ==
The 8.6-acre (3.5 ha) Kohlreiter Square is located on the north side of Rockaway Freeway between Beach 67th and Beach 69th Streets.

There are three wildlife sanctuaries in Arverne, all part of the Gateway National Recreation Area. The Dubos Point Wildlife Sanctuary is northeast of the intersection of Da Costa Avenue and Beach 65th Street, fronting Jamaica Bay. It was acquired in 1988 and named for microbiologist Dr. René Dubos. At the northwest corner of Arverne is Brant Point Wildlife Sanctuary, located west of Beach 72nd Street and north of Hillmeyer Avenue on Jamaica Bay. It was transferred to the jurisdiction of the New York City Department of Parks and Recreation in 1992. A third sanctuary, Vernam Barbadoes Preserve, is on Terrapeninsula, a peninsula between two inlets of Jamaica Bay west of Beach 75th Street and north of Amstel Boulevard. It was designated as the "Terrapeninsula Preserve" in 1997, but is commonly referred to as Vernam.
