= 2023 New York City Council election =

2023 New York City Council elections
- November 7, 2023

All 51 seats on the New York City Council 26 seats needed for a majority
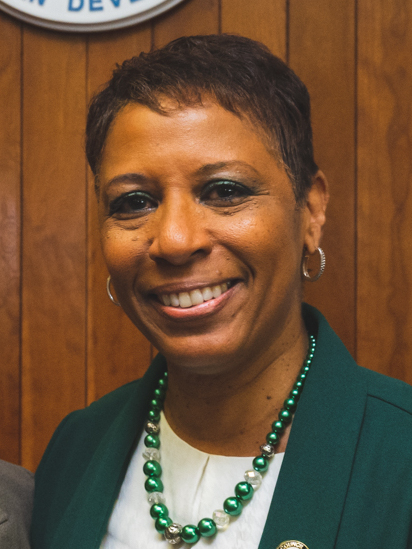

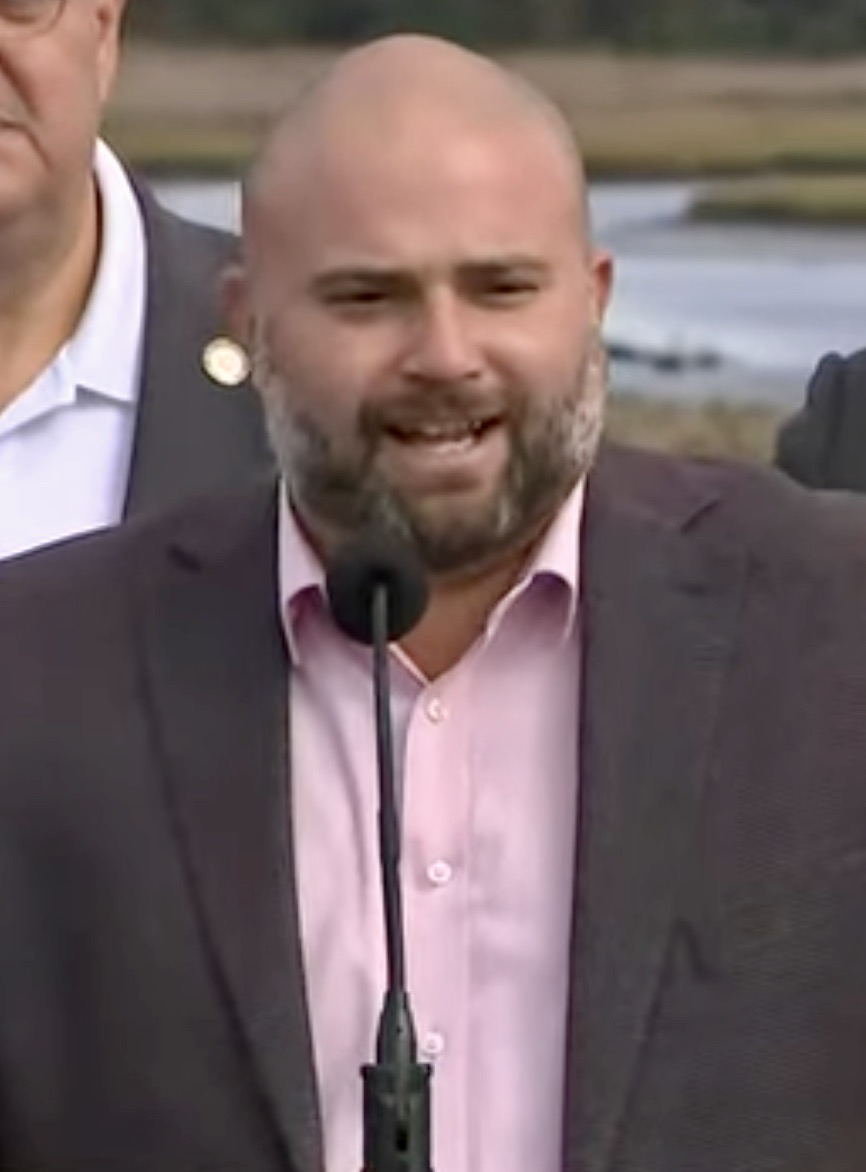
	Majority party	Minority party
Leader	Adrienne Adams	Joe Borelli
Party	Democratic	Republican
Leader's seat	28th–Jamaica	51st–Annadale
Last election	46	5
Seats before	45	6
Seats won	45	6
Seat change	Steady	Steady
Popular vote	378,048	128,123
Percentage	75.4%	24.5%
Swing		-
- Democratic hold Democratic gain Republican hold Republican gain
Speaker before election
Adrienne Adams
Democratic
Elected Speaker
Adrienne Adams
Democratic

The 2023 New York City Council elections were held on November 7, 2023, with primaries having occurred on June 27, 2023. Due to redistricting and the 2020 changes to the New York City Charter, councilmembers elected during the 2021 and 2023 City Council elections will serve two-year terms, with full four-year terms resuming after the 2025 New York City Council elections. Party nominees were chosen using ranked-choice voting.

Two incumbents lost re-election; Democrat Marjorie Velazquez lost to Republican Kristy Marmorato, while Republican Ari Kagan, who was elected as a Democrat in 2021 but switched parties in 2022, lost to a fellow incumbent, Democrat Justin Brannan. Brannan and Kagan had been placed in the same district, creating a new district with no incumbent which was won by Democrat Susan Zhuang. All other incumbents were re-elected except for two: Democrat Kristin Richardson Jordan, who retired and was succeeded by fellow Democrat Yusef Salaam, and Democrat Charles Barron, who ran for re-election but lost the Democratic primary to Chris Banks, who went on to win the general election.

The partisan composition of the council remained unchanged. This was the most seats won by the Republican Party in a New York City Council election since 1997.

== Outgoing incumbents ==
=== Retiring ===
District	Incumbent	Party	Elected	Party
9	Kristin Richardson Jordan	Democratic	Yusef Salaam	Democratic

=== Defeated in primary election ===
District	Incumbent	Party	Elected	Party
42	Charles Barron	Democratic	Chris Banks	Democratic

=== Defeated in general election ===
District	Incumbent	Party	Elected	Party
13	Marjorie Velázquez	Democratic	Kristy Marmorato	Republican
47	Ari Kagan	Republican	Justin Brannan	Democratic

== District 1 ==
2023 New York City's 1st City Council district election
- November 7, 2023
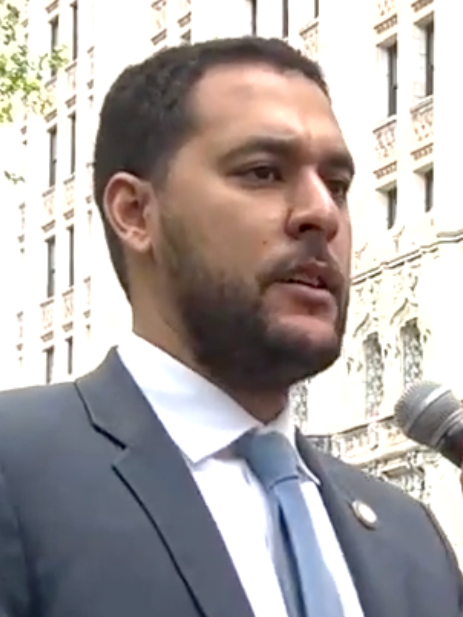

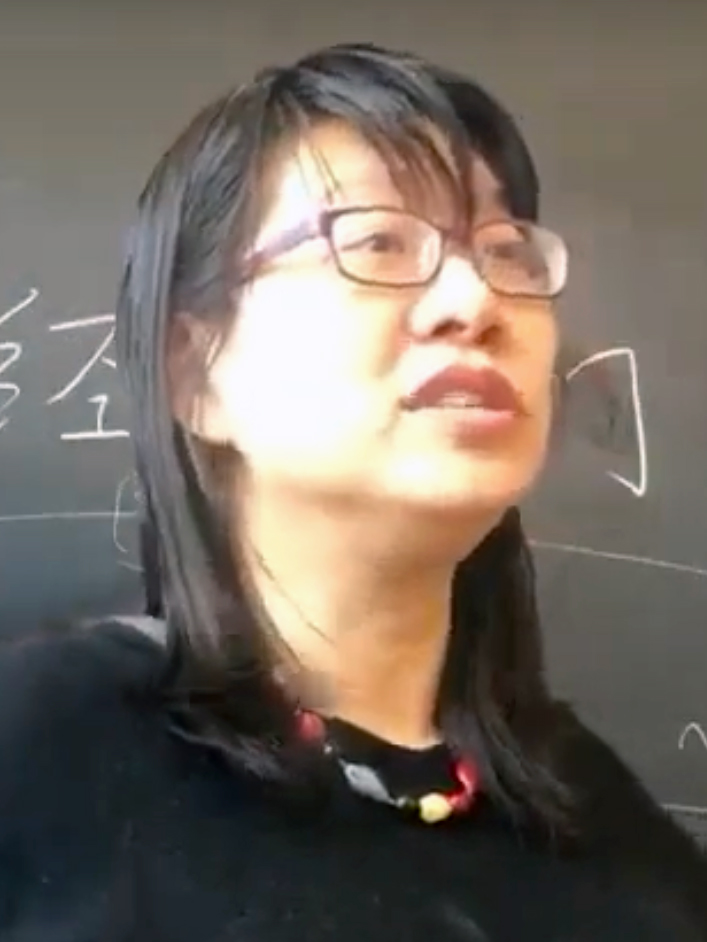
	Majority party	Minority party
Candidate	Christopher Marte	Helen Qiu
Party	Democratic	Republican
Alliance		Conservative
Popular vote	9,038	4,122
Percentage	68.1%	31.1%
Councilmember before election
Christopher Marte
Democratic
Elected Councilmember
Christopher Marte
Democratic

=== Democratic primary ===
==== Nominee ====
- Christopher Marte, incumbent councilmember

==== Eliminated in primary ====
- Ursila Jung, member of the Community Education Council from the 3rd district
- Susan Lee, author, non-profit executive, and candidate for this seat in 2021
- Pooi Stewart, candidate for New York's 86th State Assembly district in 2022

==== Endorsements ====
Ursila Jung

Individuals

- Susan Lee, author, non-profit executive, and candidate for this seat in 2021 and 2023 (cross-endorsement)

Organizations

- Citizens Union (second choice)
- Emgage PAC
Susan Lee

Individuals

- Ursila Jung, member of the Community Education Council from the 3rd district and candidate for this seat in 2023 (cross-endorsement)

Labor unions

- Captains Endowment Association
- Detectives' Endowment Association
- District Council 37
- Lieutenants Benevolent Association
- New York City Coalition of the International Union of Operating Engineers
- Sergeants Benevolent Association

Organizations

- American Institute of Architects New York
- Citizens Union (first choice)
Christopher Marte

Labor unions

- Council of School Supervisors & Administrators
- Professional Staff Congress CUNY
- United Federation of Teachers

Organizations

- Citizens Union (third choice)
- New York League of Conservation Voters
- Planned Parenthood of Greater New York Action Fund
- Stonewall Democratic Club of New York City

==== Debate ====
2023 New York's 1st City Council district Democratic primary debate
No.	Date	Host	Moderator	Link	Democratic	Democratic	Democratic	Democratic
Key: P Participant A Absent N Not invited I Invited W Withdrawn								
Key: P Participant A Absent N Not invited I Invited W Withdrawn					Ursila Jung	Susan Lee	Christopher Marte	Pooi Stewart
1	Jun. 13, 2023	Schneps Media	Robert Pozarycki	YouTube	P	P	A	P

==== Results ====
Democratic primary results
Party	Candidate	Votes	%
Democratic	Christopher Marte (incumbent)	5,485	62.6
Democratic	Susan Lee	2,707	30.9
Democratic	Ursila Jung	441	5.0
Democratic	Pooi Stewart	97	1.1
Write-in		31	0.4
Total votes		8,761	100.0

=== Republican primary ===
==== Nominee ====
- Helen Qiu, member of Community Education Council 3 and nominee for New York's 65th State Assembly district in 2022

==== Endorsements ====
Helen Qiu

Organizations

- Conservative Party of New York
- Manhattan Republican Party

=== Independents and minor parties ===
==== Disqualified ====
- Beatrice Ramos

=== General election ===
==== Results ====
2023 New York City's 1st City Council district election
Party	Candidate	Votes	%
Democratic	Christopher Marte (incumbent)	9,038	68.14%
Republican	Helen Qiu (Note: Shared with "Common Sense" ballot line.)	3,661	27.60%
Conservative	Helen Qiu (Note: Shared with "Arts & Culture" ballot line.)	461	3.48%
Total	Helen Qiu	4,122	31.08%
Write-in		103	0.78%
Total votes		13,263	100.00%
Democratic hold			

== District 2 ==
2023 New York City's 2nd City Council district election
- November 7, 2023
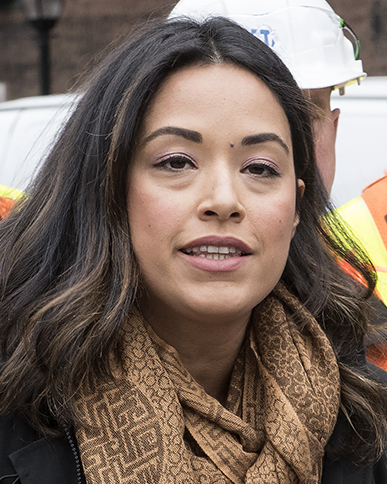
	Majority party
Candidate	Carlina Rivera
Party	Democratic
Alliance	Working Families
Popular vote	10,137
Percentage	92.9%
Councilmember before election
Carlina Rivera
Democratic
Elected Councilmember
Carlina Rivera
Democratic

=== Democratic primary ===
==== Nominee ====
- Carlina Rivera, incumbent councilmember

==== Eliminated in primary ====
- Allie Ryan, Neighborhood Party nominee for this seat in 2021

==== Endorsements ====
Carlina Rivera

Labor unions

- Council of School Supervisors & Administrators
- District Council 37
- International Union of Painters and Allied Trades District Council 9
- LiUNA! New York
- New York City Central Labor Council
- New York City Coalition of the International Union of Operating Engineers
- New York State Nurses Association
- NYC District Council of Carpenters
- United Federation of Teachers

Organizations

- Citizen Action of New York
- Moms Demand Action
- New York League of Conservation Voters
- Open New York
- Our Revolution
- Planned Parenthood of Greater New York Action Fund
- Stonewall Democratic Club of New York City
- Working Families Party

==== Results ====
Democratic primary results
Party	Candidate	Votes	%
Democratic	Carlina Rivera (incumbent)	4,688	60.5
Democratic	Allie Ryan	2,980	38.5
Write-in		76	1.0
Total votes		7,685	100.0

=== Republican primary ===
==== Disqualified ====
- Juan Pagan, perennial candidate

==== Endorsements ====
Juan Pagan

Organizations

- Manhattan Republican Party

=== General election ===
==== Results ====
2023 New York City's 2nd City Council district election
Party	Candidate	Votes	%
Democratic	Carlina Rivera	8,627	79.02%
Working Families	Carlina Rivera	1,510	13.84%
Total	Carlina Rivera (incumbent)	10,137	92.86%
Write-in		780	7.14%
Total votes		10,917	100.0%
Democratic hold			

== District 3 ==
2023 New York City's 3rd City Council district election
- November 7, 2023
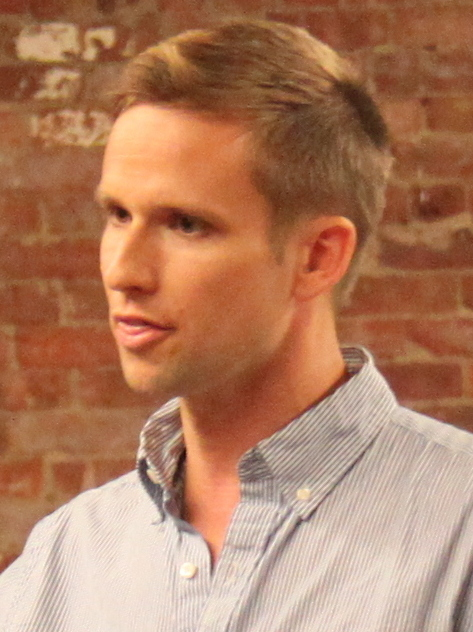

	Majority party	Minority party
Candidate	Erik Bottcher	Robert Bobrick
Party	Democratic	Republican
Popular vote	14,167	1,648
Percentage	89.1%	10.4%
Councilmember before election
Erik Bottcher
Democratic
Elected Councilmember
Erik Bottcher
Democratic

=== Democratic primary ===
==== Nominee ====
- Erik Bottcher, incumbent councilmember

==== Endorsements ====
Erik Bottcher

Labor unions

- Council of School Supervisors & Administrators
- District Council 37
- Freelancers Union
- International Union of Painters and Allied Trades District Council 9
- LiUNA! New York
- New York City Central Labor Council
- New York City Coalition of the International Union of Operating Engineers
- New York State Nurses Association
- NYC District Council of Carpenters
- Professional Staff Congress CUNY

Organizations

- American Institute of Architects New York
- LGBTQ Victory Fund
- New York League of Conservation Voters
- Open New York
- Stonewall Democratic Club of New York City

=== Republican primary ===
==== Nominee ====
- Robert Bobrick, retired teacher

=== General election ===
==== Results ====
2023 New York City's 3rd City Council district election
Party	Candidate	Votes	%
Democratic	Erik Bottcher (incumbent)	14,167	89.08%
Republican	Robert Bobrick	1,469	9.23%
Medical Freedom	Robert Bobrick	179	1.13%
Total	Robert Bobrick	1,648	10.36%
Write-in		88	0.55%
Total votes		15,903	100.0%
Democratic hold			

== District 4 ==
2023 New York City's 4th City Council district election
- November 7, 2023
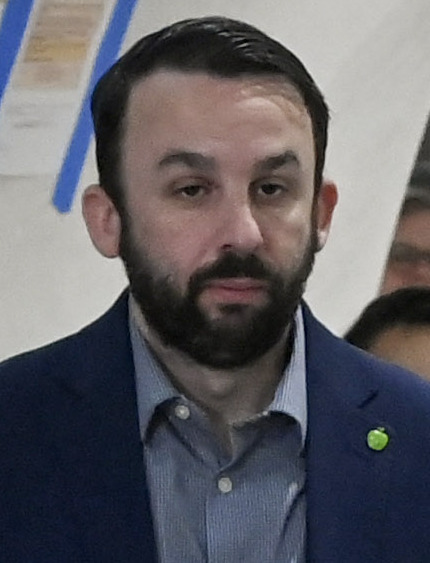

	Majority party	Minority party
Candidate	Keith Powers	Brian Robinson
Party	Democratic	Republican
Popular vote	13,159	4,683
Percentage	73.5%	26.1%
Councilmember before election
Keith Powers
Democratic
Elected Councilmember
Keith Powers
Democratic

=== Democratic primary ===
==== Nominee ====
- Keith Powers, incumbent councilmember

==== Endorsements ====
Keith Powers

Labor unions

- Council of School Supervisors & Administrators
- District Council 37
- Freelancers Union
- International Union of Painters and Allied Trades District Council 9
- LiUNA! New York
- New York City Central Labor Council
- New York City Coalition of the International Union of Operating Engineers
- New York State Nurses Association
- NYC District Council of Carpenters

Organizations

- American Institute of Architects New York
- Open New York
- Planned Parenthood of Greater New York Action Fund
- Stonewall Democratic Club of New York City

=== Republican primary ===
==== Nominee ====
- Brian Robinson, credit counselor and Democratic candidate for New York's 10th congressional district in 2022

==== Endorsements ====
Brian Robinson

Organizations

- Manhattan Republican Party

=== General election ===
==== Results ====
2023 New York City's 4th City Council district election
Party	Candidate	Votes	%
Democratic	Keith Powers (incumbent)	13,159	73.45%
Republican	Brian Robinson	4,534	25.31%
Parent Party	Brian Robinson	149	0.83%
Total	Brian Robinson	4,683	26.14%
Write-in		74	0.41%
Total votes		17,916	100.0%
Democratic hold			

== District 5 ==
2023 New York City's 5th City Council district election
- November 7, 2023
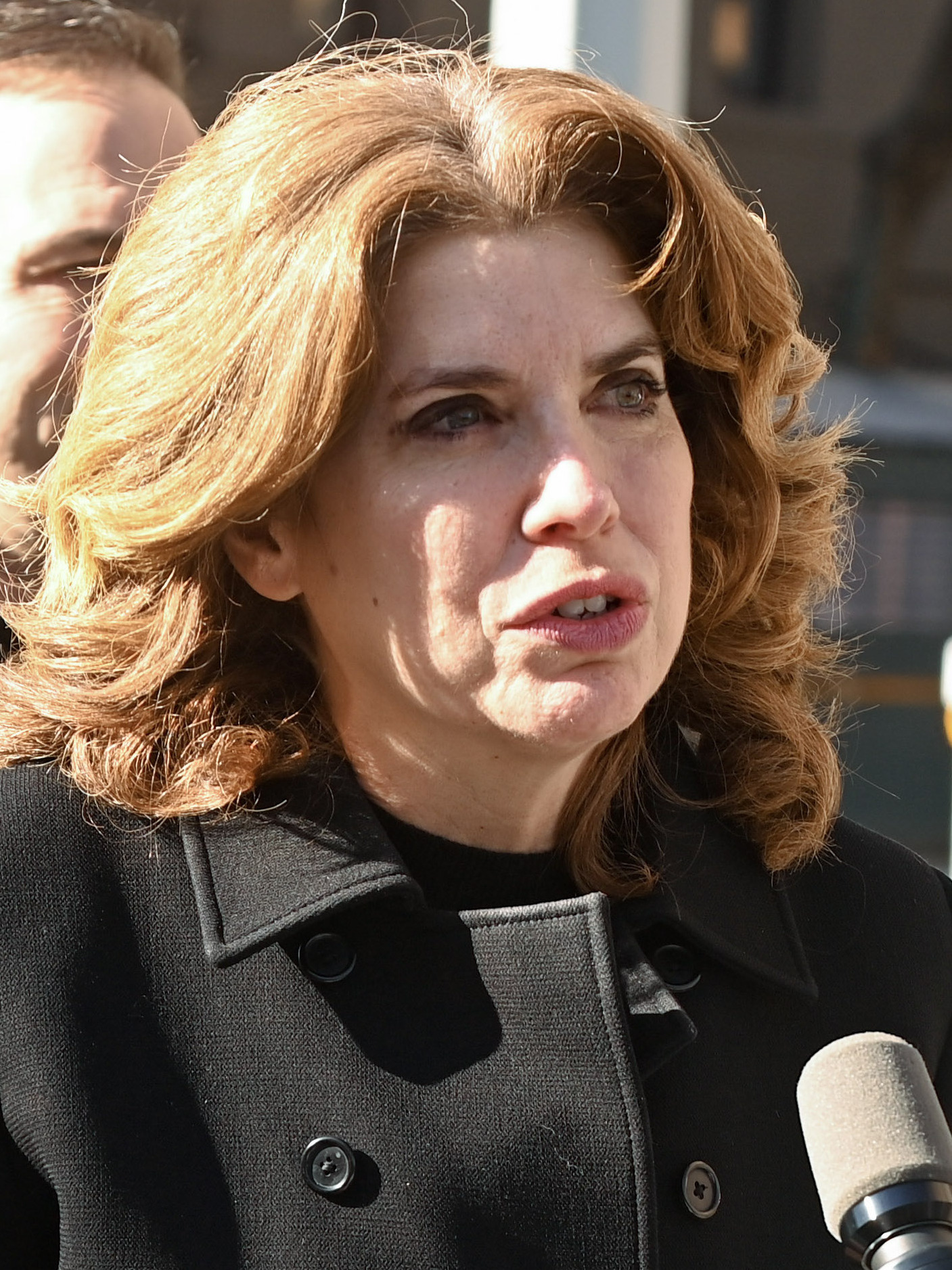

	Majority party	Minority party
Candidate	Julie Menin	Elizabeth Golluscio
Party	Democratic	Republican
Popular vote	14,970	3,366
Percentage	81.1%	18.2%
Councilmember before election
Julie Menin
Democratic
Elected Councilmember
Julie Menin
Democratic

=== Democratic primary ===
==== Nominee ====
- Julie Menin, incumbent councilmember

==== Endorsements ====
Julie Menin

Labor unions

- Council of School Supervisors & Administrators
- District Council 37
- Freelancers Union
- International Union of Painters and Allied Trades District Council 9
- New York City Central Labor Council
- New York City Coalition of the International Union of Operating Engineers
- New York State Nurses Association
- NYC District Council of Carpenters
- Transport Workers Union Local 100

Organizations

- League of Conservation Voters
- Planned Parenthood of Greater New York Action Fund
- Stonewall Democratic Club of New York City

=== Republican primary ===
==== Nominee ====
- Elizabeth Golluscio, software executive

==== Endorsements ====
Elizabeth Golluscio

Organizations

- Manhattan Republican Party

=== General election ===
==== Results ====
2023 New York City's 5th City Council district election
Party	Candidate	Votes	%
Democratic	Julie Menin (incumbent)	14,970	81.06%
Republican	Elizabeth Golluscio	3,366	18.23%
Write-in		131	0.71%
Total votes		18,467	100.0%
Democratic hold			

== District 6 ==
2023 New York City's 6th City Council district election
- November 7, 2023
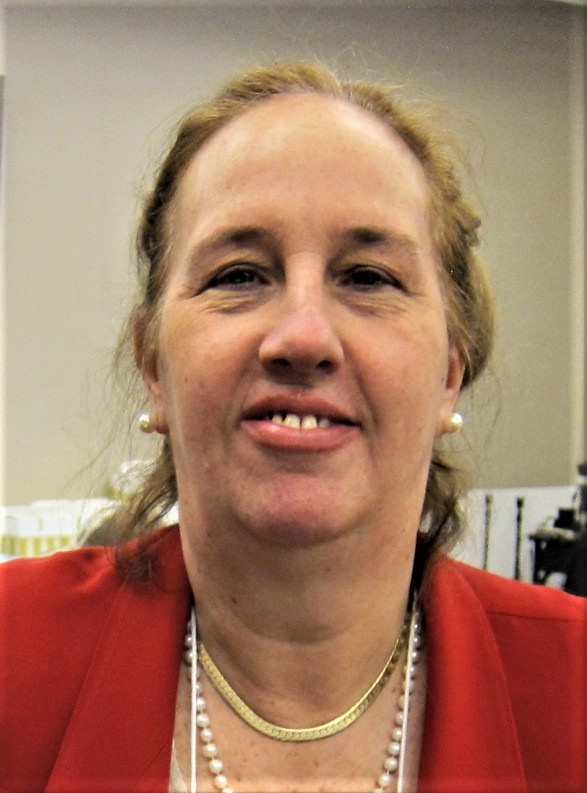

	Majority party	Minority party
Candidate	Gale Brewer	Diane di Stasio
Party	Democratic	Republican
Popular vote	18,196	3,910
Percentage	81.4%	17.5%
Councilmember before election
Gale Brewer
Democratic
Elected Councilmember
Gale Brewer
Democratic

=== Democratic primary ===
==== Nominee ====
- Gale Brewer, incumbent councilmember

==== Endorsements ====
Gale Brewer

Labor unions

- Council of School Supervisors & Administrators
- District Council 37
- Freelancers Union
- International Union of Painters and Allied Trades District Council 9
- LiUNA! New York
- New York City Central Labor Council
- New York City Coalition of the International Union of Operating Engineers
- NYC District Council of Carpenters
- Professional Staff Congress CUNY
- United Federation of Teachers

Organizations

- Citizen Action of New York
- New York League of Conservation Voters
- Planned Parenthood of Greater New York Action Fund
- Stonewall Democratic Club of New York City

=== Republican primary ===
==== Nominee ====
- Diane di Stasio, singer, actress and ballet school managing director

==== Endorsements ====
Diane di Stasio

Organizations

- Manhattan Republican Party

=== Independents and minor parties ===
==== Declared ====
- Barbara Simpson

=== General election ===
==== Results ====
2023 New York City's 6th City Council district election
Party	Candidate	Votes	%
Democratic	Gale Brewer (incumbent)	18,196	81.44%
Republican	Diane di Stasio	3,529	15.79%
Clean Up NY/Arts & Culture	Diane di Stasio	381	1.71%
Total	Diane di Stasio	3,910	17.50%
Medical Freedom	Barbara Simpson	147	0.66%
Write-in		90	0.40%
Total votes		22,343	100.0%
Democratic hold			

== District 7 ==
2023 New York City's 7th City Council district election
- November 7, 2023
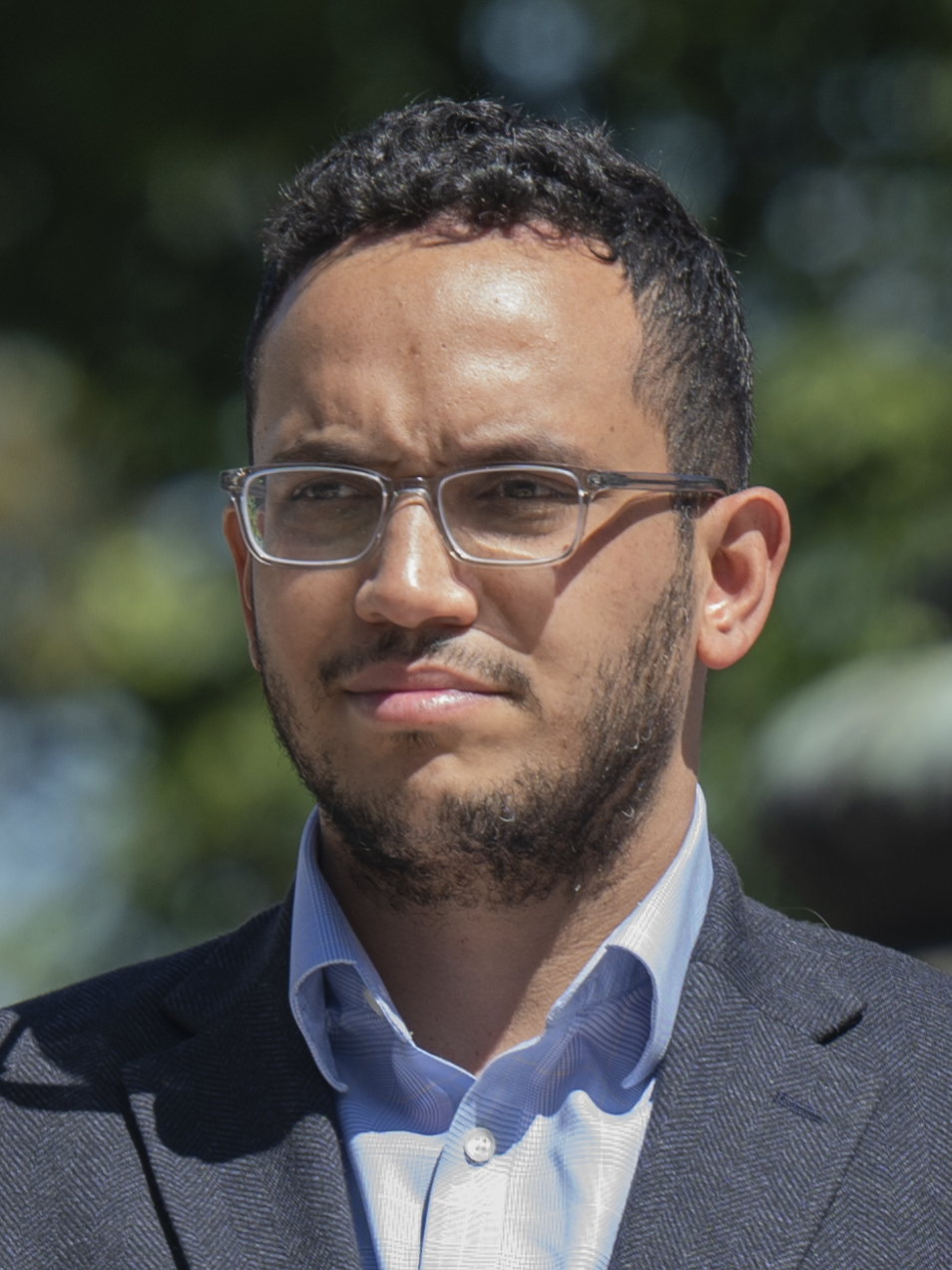
	Majority party
Candidate	Shaun Abreu
Party	Democratic
Popular vote	13,061
Percentage	97.35%
Councilmember before election
Shaun Abreu
Democratic
Elected Councilmember
Shaun Abreu
Democratic

=== Democratic primary ===
==== Nominee ====
- Shaun Abreu, incumbent councilmember

==== Endorsements ====
Shaun Abreu

Labor unions

- Council of School Supervisors & Administrators
- District Council 37
- Freelancers Union
- International Union of Painters and Allied Trades District Council 9
- New York City Central Labor Council
- New York City Coalition of the International Union of Operating Engineers
- New York State Nurses Association
- NYC District Council of Carpenters

Organizations

- Jim Owles Liberal Democratic Club
- Moms Demand Action
- New York League of Conservation Voters
- Open New York
- Planned Parenthood of Greater New York Action Fund
- Stonewall Democratic Club of New York City

=== Republican primary ===
==== Disqualified ====
- Emily Yuexin Miller

=== Independents and minor parties ===
==== Disqualified ====
- Davon Phillips

=== General election ===
==== Results ====
2023 New York City's 7th City Council district election
Party	Candidate	Votes	%
Democratic	Shaun Abreu (incumbent)	13,061	97.35%
Write-in		355	2.65%
Total votes		13,416	100.0%
Democratic hold			

== District 8 ==
2023 New York City's 8th City Council district election
- November 7, 2023
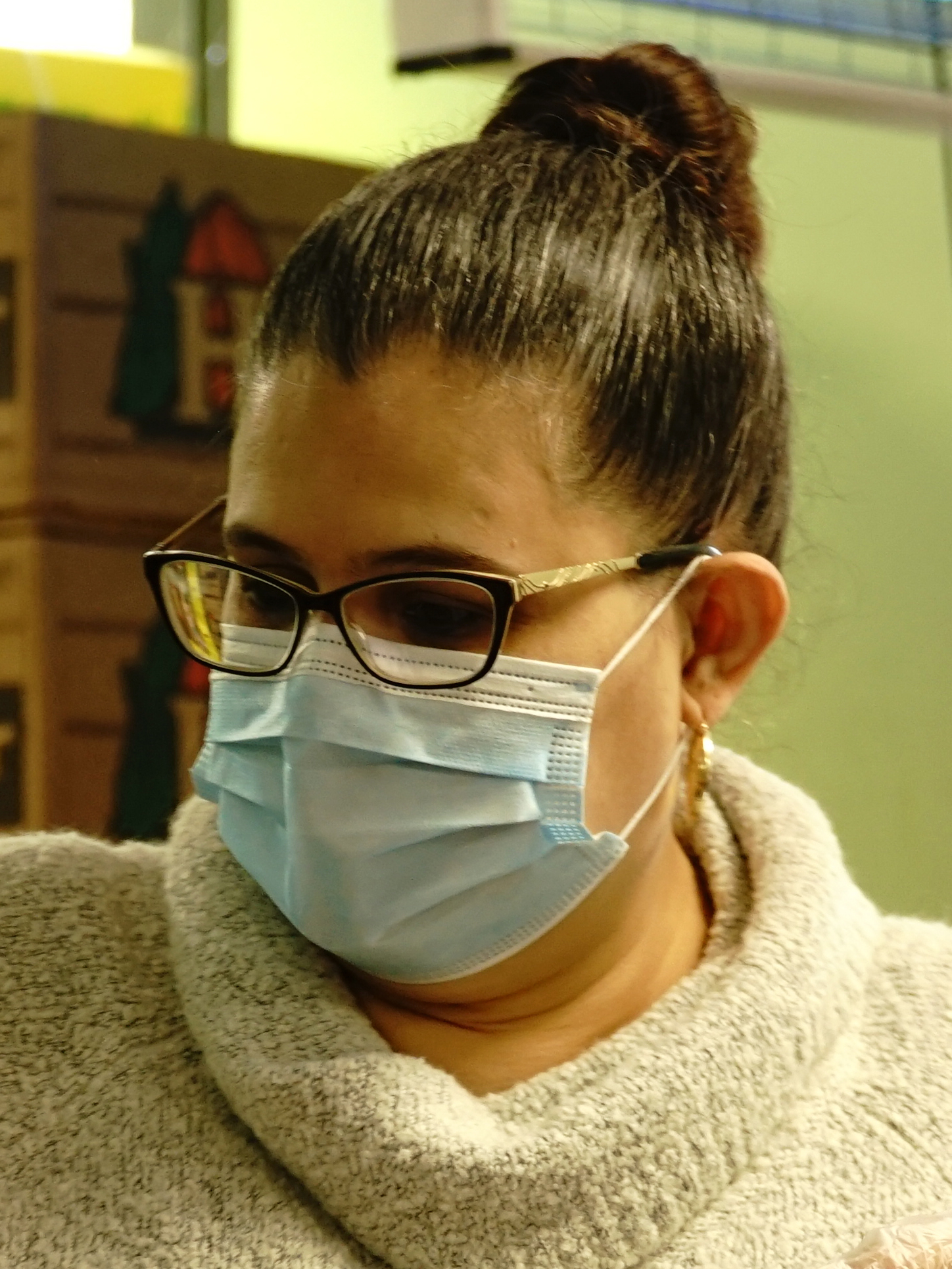

	Majority party	Minority party
Candidate	Diana Ayala	Exodus Gary
Party	Democratic	Republican
Popular vote	5,571	741
Percentage	87.3%	11.6%
Councilmember before election
Diana Ayala
Democratic
Elected Councilmember
Diana Ayala
Democratic

=== Democratic primary ===
==== Nominee ====
- Diana Ayala, incumbent councilmember

==== Withdrawn ====
- Ildefonso Rivera

==== Endorsements ====
Diana Ayala

Labor unions

- Council of School Supervisors & Administrators
- District Council 37
- International Union of Painters and Allied Trades District Council 9
- LiUNA! New York
- New York City Central Labor Council
- New York City Coalition of the International Union of Operating Engineers
- New York State Nurses Association
- Professional Staff Congress CUNY

Organizations

- New York League of Conservation Voters

=== Republican primary ===
==== Nominee ====
- Exodus Gary

=== Independents and minor parties ===
==== Disqualified ====
- Jamal Lightly
- Sara Lobman

=== General election ===
==== Results ====
2023 New York City's 8th City Council district election
Party	Candidate	Votes	%
Democratic	Diana Ayala (incumbent)	5,571	87.32%
Republican	Exodus Gary	741	11.61%
Write-in		68	1.07%
Total votes		6,380	100.0%
Democratic hold			

== District 9 ==
2023 New York City's 9th City Council district election
- November 7, 2023
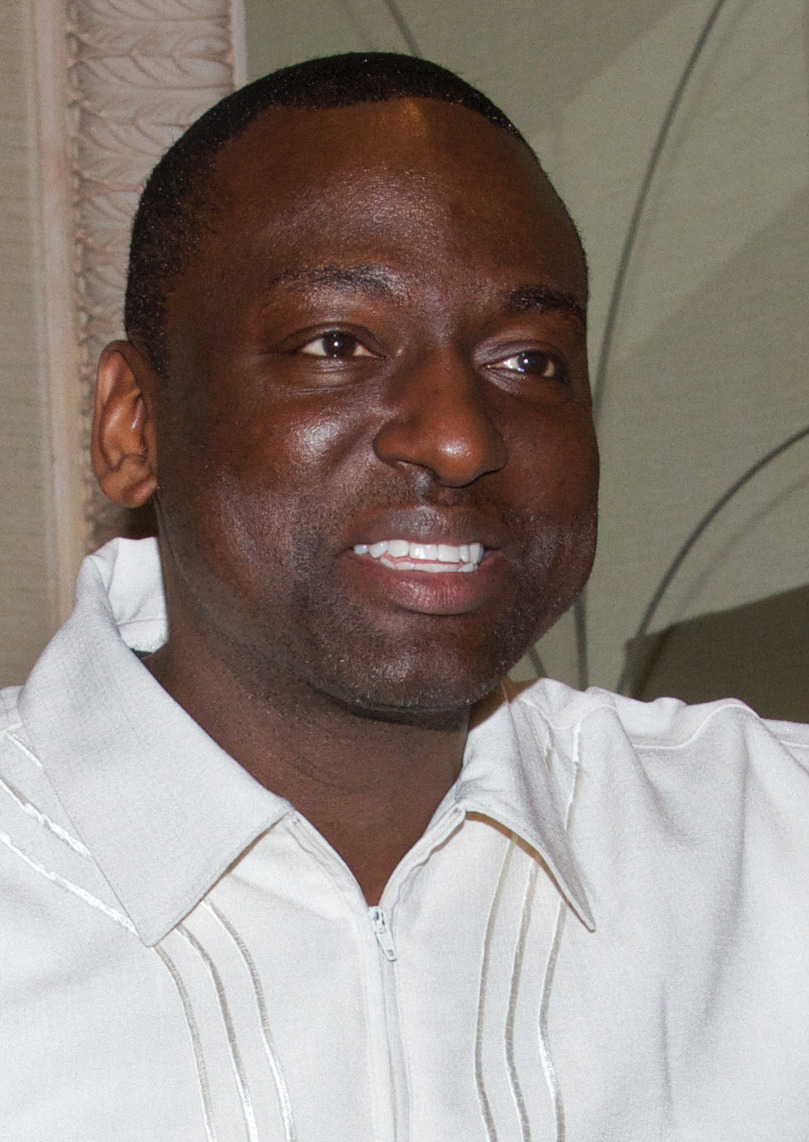
	Majority party
Candidate	Yusef Salaam
Party	Democratic
Popular vote	11,972
Percentage	98.4%
Councilmember before election
Kristin Richardson Jordan
Democratic
Elected Councilmember
Yusef Salaam
Democratic

=== Democratic primary ===
==== Nominee ====
- Yusef Salaam, criminal justice advocate and member of the Exonerated Five

==== Eliminated in primary ====
- Inez Dickens, New York State Assemblymember from the 70th district (2017–present) and former Majority Whip of the New York City Council (2006–2013) from the 9th district (2006–2016)
- Al Taylor, New York State Assemblymember from the 71st district (2017–present)

==== Withdrawn ====
- Joshua Clennon, low income housing manager and candidate for this seat in 2021
- Kristin Richardson Jordan, incumbent councilmember (remained on ballot)

==== Declined ====
- Athena Moore, political aide and candidate for this seat in 2021

==== Endorsements ====
Inez Dickens

U.S. representatives

- Adriano Espaillat, U.S. representative from New York's 13th congressional district (2017–present)
- Charles Rangel, former U.S. representative from New York's 13th congressional district (1971–2017)

State officials

- H. Carl McCall, former New York State Comptroller (1993–2002), former New York state senator from the 28th district (1975–1980), and nominee for governor in 2002
- David Paterson, former chair of the New York State Democratic Committee (2014–2015), former governor of New York (2008–2010), former lieutenant governor of New York (2007–2008), former Majority Leader of the New York State Senate (2003–2006), former New York state senator from the 30th district (2003–2006), and former New York state senator from the 29th district (1985–2002)

Local officials

- Shaun Abreu, New York City Councilmember from the 7th district (2022–present)
- Eric Adams, mayor of New York City (2022–present), former Brooklyn borough president (2014–2021), and former New York state senator from the 20th district (2007–2013)
- Diana Ayala, Deputy Speaker of the New York City Council (2022–present) and New York City Councilmember from the 8th district (2018–present)
- Carmen De La Rosa, New York City Councilmember from the 10th district (2022–present) and former New York State Assemblymember from the 72nd district (2017–2021)

Labor unions

- United Federation of Teachers

Organizations

- Jim Owles Liberal Democratic Club
Kristin Richardson Jordan (withdrawn)

Organizations

- LGBTQ Victory Fund
Yusef Salaam

State officials

- Keith Ellison, Attorney General of Minnesota (2019–present), former U.S. representative from Minnesota's 5th congressional district (2007–2019), former Deputy Chair of the Democratic National Committee (2017–2018), and former member of the Minnesota House of Representatives from the 58B district (2003–2007)

State legislators

- Daniel J. O'Donnell, New York State Assemblymember from the 69th district (2003–present)
- Al Taylor, New York State Assemblymember from the 71st district (2017–present) and candidate for this seat in 2023 (cross-endorsement)
- Keith L. T. Wright, chair of the Manhattan Democratic Committee (2009–present), former New York State Assemblymember from the 70th district (1993–2016), and former chair of the New York State Democratic Committee (2012–2014)

Local officials

- C. Virginia Fields, former Manhattan borough president (1998–2005)

Individuals

- Cornel West, philosopher, social critic, and candidate for president of the United States in 2024 (Green)

Organizations

- Emgage PAC
- Open New York
- Stonewall Democratic Club of New York City
Al Taylor

State legislators

- Cordell Cleare, New York state senator from the 30th district (2021–present) and candidate for this seat in 2017 and 2021
- Eddie Gibbs, New York State Assemblymember from the 68th district (2022–present)

Individuals

- Yusef Salaam, criminal justice advocate, member of the Exonerated Five, and candidate for this seat in 2023 (cross-endorsement)

Labor unions

- International Union of Bricklayers and Allied Craftworkers Local 1
- International Union of Bricklayers and Allied Craftworkers Local 7
- NYC District Council of Carpenters
Declined to endorse

Labor unions

- District Council 37

Organizations

- Citizens Union

==== Debate ====
2023 New York's 9th City Council district Democratic primary debate
No.	Date	Host	Moderator	Link	Democratic	Democratic	Democratic
Key: P Participant A Absent N Not invited I Invited W Withdrawn							
Key: P Participant A Absent N Not invited I Invited W Withdrawn					Inez Dickens	Yusef Salaam	Al Taylor
1	Jun. 6, 2023	Schneps Media	Robert Pozarycki; Ethan Stark-Miller	YouTube	P	P	P
2	May 17, 2023	CUNY TV	Kiiru Gichuru	YouTube	P	P	P

==== Results ====
Democratic primary results
Party	Candidate	Maximum round	Maximum votes	Share in maximum round	Maximum votes First round votes Transfer votes
Democratic	Yusef Salaam	3	6,993	63.8%	
Democratic	Inez Dickens	3	3,962	36.2%	
Democratic	Al Taylor	2	1,685	14.8%	
Democratic	Kristin Richardson Jordan (incumbent, withdrawn)	2	1,108	9.7%	
Write-in		1	121	1.1%	

=== Independents and minor parties ===
==== Disqualified ====
- Christopher Morris-Perry, Conservative Party nominee for New York's 13th congressional district in 2020
- Skiboky Stora, independent candidate for mayor of New York City in 2021

=== General election ===
==== Results ====
2023 New York City's 9th City Council district election
Party	Candidate	Votes	%
Democratic	Yusef Salaam	11,972	98.35%
Write-in		201	1.65%
Total votes		12,173	100.0%
Democratic hold			

== District 10 ==
2023 New York City's 10th City Council district election
- November 7, 2023
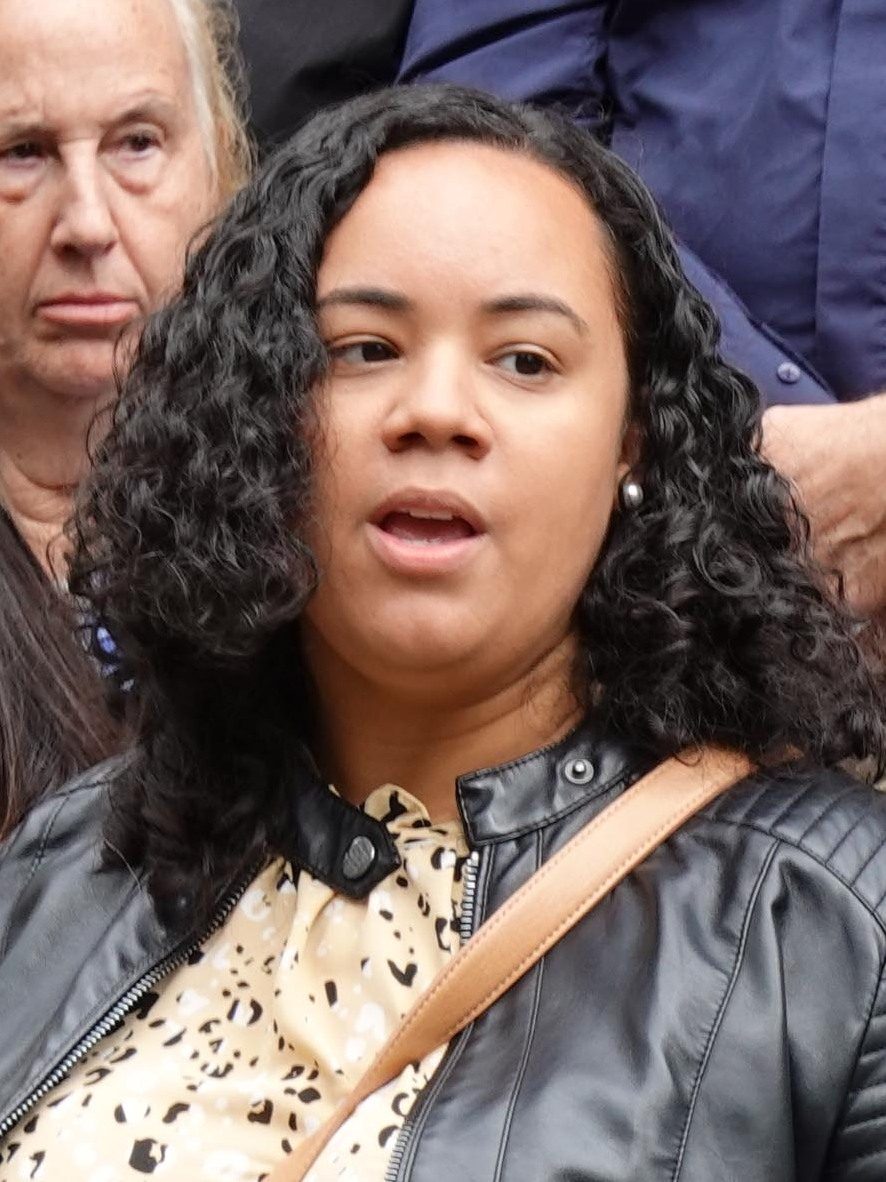
	Majority party
Candidate	Carmen De La Rosa
Party	Democratic
Alliance	Working Families
Popular vote	8,207
Percentage	96.4%
Councilmember before election
Carmen De La Rosa
Democratic
Elected Councilmember
Carmen De La Rosa
Democratic

=== Democratic primary ===
==== Nominee ====
- Carmen De La Rosa, incumbent councilmember

==== Eliminated in primary ====
- Guillermo Perez, perennial candidate

==== Endorsements ====
Carmen De La Rosa

Labor unions

- Council of School Supervisors & Administrators
- District Council 37
- Freelancers Union
- International Union of Painters and Allied Trades District Council 9
- LiUNA! New York
- New York City Central Labor Council
- New York City Coalition of the International Union of Operating Engineers
- New York State Nurses Association
- NYC District Council of Carpenters

Organizations

- Citizen Action of New York
- The Jewish Vote
- Make the Road Action
- New York League of Conservation Voters
- Stonewall Democratic Club of New York City
- Working Families Party

==== Results ====
Democratic primary results
Party	Candidate	Votes	%
Democratic	Carmen De La Rosa (incumbent)	5,098	84.6
Democratic	Guillermo Perez	768	12.7
Write-in		161	2.7
Total votes		6,027	100.0

=== Independents and minor parties ===
==== Disqualified ====
- Antoine Sedrick, (Freedom Party)

=== General election ===
==== Results ====
2023 New York City's 10th City Council district election
Party	Candidate	Votes	%
Democratic	Carmen De La Rosa	7,161	76.98%
Working Families	Carmen De La Rosa	1,814	19.50%
Total	Carmen De La Rosa (incumbent)	8,975	96.48%
Write-in		327	3.52%
Total votes		9,302	100.0%
Democratic hold			

== District 11 ==
2023 New York City's 11th City Council district election
- November 7, 2023
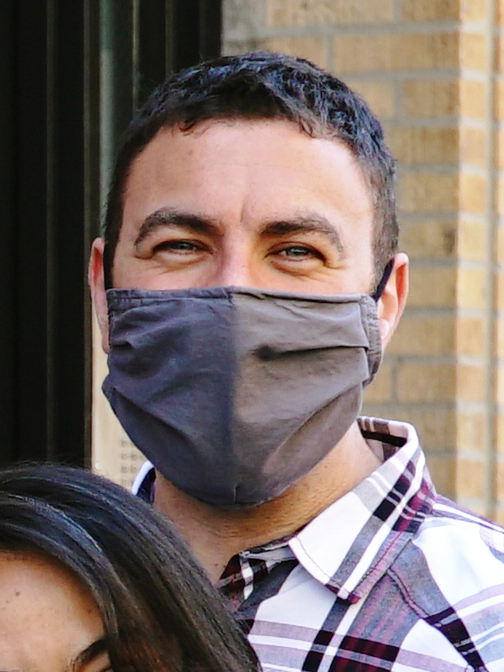

	Majority party	Minority party
Candidate	Eric Dinowitz	Robert Caemmerer
Party	Democratic	Republican
Alliance		Conservative
Popular vote	9,594	1,642
Percentage	83.7%	14.3%
Councilmember before election
Eric Dinowitz
Democratic
Elected Councilmember
Eric Dinowitz
Democratic

=== Democratic primary ===
==== Nominee ====
- Eric Dinowitz, incumbent councilmember

==== Endorsements ====
Eric Dinowitz

Labor unions

- Council of School Supervisors & Administrators
- District Council 37
- International Union of Painters and Allied Trades District Council 9
- LiUNA! New York
- New York City Central Labor Council
- New York City Coalition of the International Union of Operating Engineers
- New York State Nurses Association
- NYC District Council of Carpenters
- Professional Staff Congress CUNY
- United Federation of Teachers

Organizations

- New York League of Conservation Voters
- Planned Parenthood of Greater New York Action Fund
- Stonewall Democratic Club of New York City

=== Republican primary ===
==== Nominee ====
- Robert Caemmerer

==== Endorsements ====
Robert Caemmerer

Organizations

- Conservative Party of New York

=== General election ===
==== Results ====
2023 New York City's 11th City Council district election
Party	Candidate	Votes	%
Democratic	Eric Dinowitz (incumbent)	9,594	83.72%
Republican	Robert Caemmerer	1,335	11.65%
Conservative	Robert Caemmerer (Note: Shared with "Medical Freedom" ballot line.)	307	2.68%
Total	Robert Caemmerer	1,642	14.33%
Write-in		223	1.95%
Total votes		11,459	100.0%
Democratic hold			

== District 12 ==
2023 New York City's 12th City Council district election
- November 7, 2023
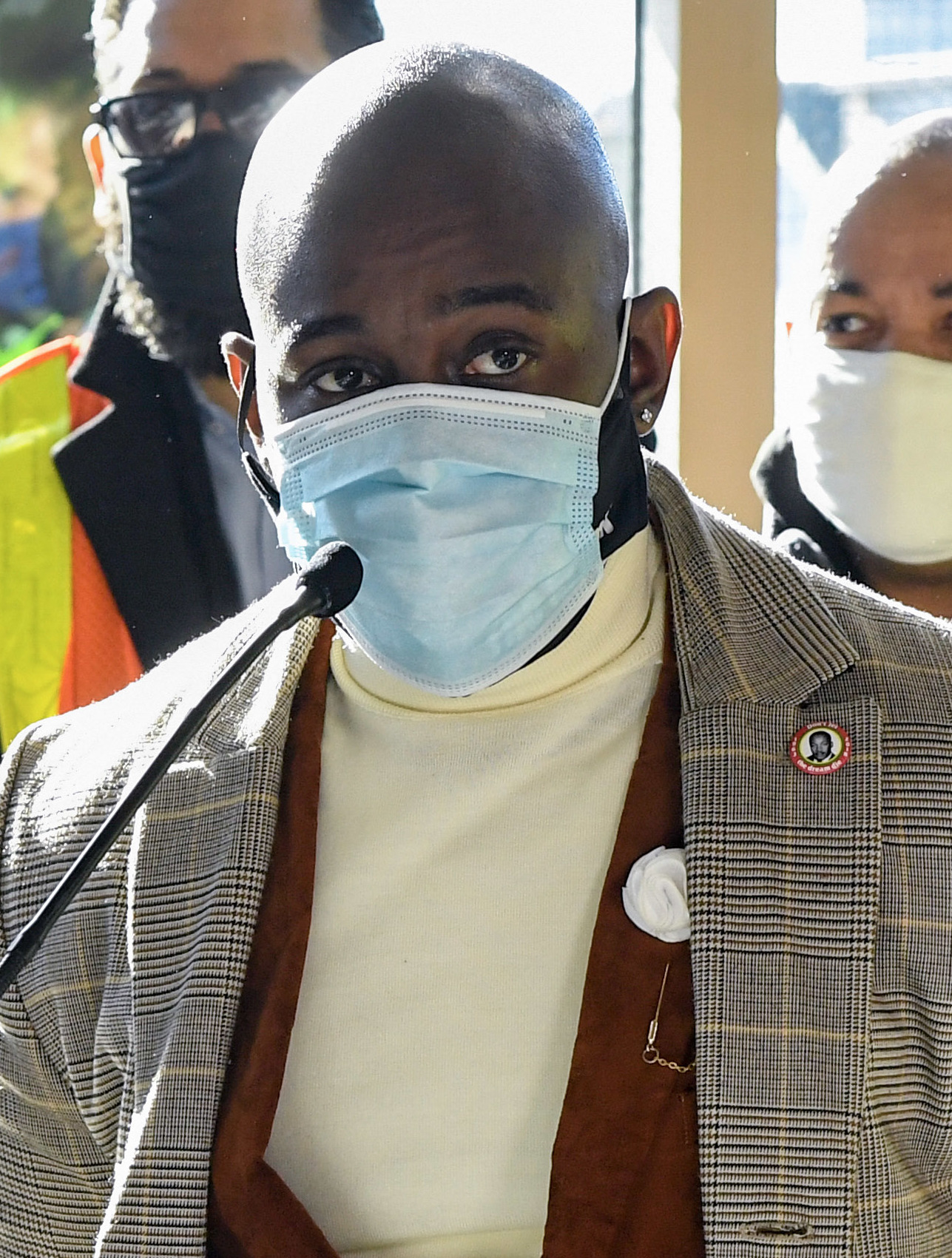

	Majority party	Minority party
Candidate	Kevin Riley	Dewayne Lee
Party	Democratic	Republican
Popular vote	9,557	692
Percentage	92.8%	6.7%
Councilmember before election
Kevin Riley
Democratic
Elected Councilmember
Kevin Riley
Democratic

=== Democratic primary ===
==== Nominee ====
- Kevin Riley, incumbent councilmember

==== Eliminated in primary ====
- Aisha Hernandez Ahmed, former Chief of Staff for former Councilmember Andy King
- Pamela Hamilton-Johnson, perennial candidate

==== Disqualified ====
- Andy King, former councilmember from the 12th district (2012–2020) (Note: King is currently ineligible to run due to the term limits imposed by the New York City Charter.)

==== Endorsements ====
Kevin Riley

Labor unions

- Communications Workers of America, District 1
- Council of School Supervisors & Administrators
- District Council 37
- Freelancers Union
- Hotel Trades Council
- International Union of Painters and Allied Trades District Council 9
- LiUNA! New York
- New York City Central Labor Council
- New York City Coalition of the International Union of Operating Engineers
- New York State Nurses Association
- NYC District Council of Carpenters
- SEIU 32BJ

Organizations

- Citizen Action of New York
- New York League of Conservation Voters
- Stonewall Democratic Club of New York City

==== Results ====
Democratic primary results
Party	Candidate	Votes	%
Democratic	Kevin Riley (incumbent)	5,858	81.7
Democratic	Pamela Hamilton-Johnson	896	12.5
Democratic	Aisha Hernandez Ahmed	393	5.5
Write-in		19	0.3
Total votes		7,166	100.0

=== Republican primary ===
==== Nominee ====
- Dewayne Lee

=== General election ===
==== Results ====
2023 New York City's 12th City Council district election
Party	Candidate	Votes	%
Democratic	Kevin Riley (incumbent)	9,557	92.76%
Republican	Dewayne Lee	692	6.72%
Write-in		54	0.52%
Total votes		10,303	100.0%
Democratic hold			

== District 13 ==
2023 New York City's 13th City Council district election
- November 7, 2023

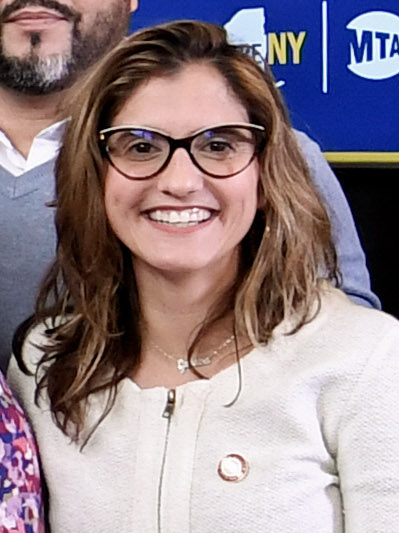
	Majority party	Minority party
Candidate	Kristy Marmorato	Marjorie Velázquez
Party	Republican	Democratic
Alliance	Conservative
Popular vote	6,566	6,103
Percentage	51.5%	47.9%
Councilmember before election
Marjorie Velázquez
Democratic
Elected Councilmember
Kristy Marmorato
Republican

=== Democratic primary ===
==== Nominee ====
- Marjorie Velázquez, incumbent councilmember

==== Eliminated in primary ====
- Irene Estrada, former member of Bronx Community Board 11 and candidate for this seat in 2021
- Bernadette Ferrara, Van Nest Neighborhood Alliance president and candidate for the 15th district in the 2021 special and regular elections
- John Perez, Army veteran and candidate for New York's 34th State Senate district in 2022

==== Endorsements ====
Irene Estrada

Individuals

- Curtis Sliwa, founder of the Guardian Angels, radio talk show host, and Republican nominee for Mayor of New York City in 2021 (Republican) (co-endorsed with Havranek)
Marjorie Velázquez

Labor unions

- Communications Workers of America, District 1
- Council of School Supervisors & Administrators
- District Council 37
- Freelancers Union
- Hotel Trades Council
- International Union of Painters and Allied Trades District Council 9
- New York City Central Labor Council
- New York City Coalition of the International Union of Operating Engineers
- New York State Nurses Association
- NYC District Council of Carpenters
- Retail, Wholesale and Department Store Union
- SEIU 32BJ

Organizations

- American Institute of Architects New York
- Citizen Action of New York
- Emgage PAC
- EMILY's List
- LiUNA! New York
- New York League of Conservation Voters
- Planned Parenthood of Greater New York Action Fund
- Run for Something
- Stonewall Democratic Club of New York City

==== Debate ====
2023 New York's 13th City Council district Democratic primary debate
No.	Date	Host	Moderator	Link	Democratic	Democratic	Democratic	Democratic
Key: P Participant A Absent N Not invited I Invited W Withdrawn								
Key: P Participant A Absent N Not invited I Invited W Withdrawn					Irene Estrada	Bernadette Ferrara	John Perez	Marjorie Velázquez
1	Jun. 15, 2023	Schneps Media	Robbie Sequeira		P	P	P	P

==== Results ====
Democratic primary results
Party	Candidate	Votes	%
Democratic	Marjorie Velázquez (incumbent)	2,780	65.4
Democratic	Bernadette Ferrara	820	19.3
Democratic	Irene Estrada	313	7.4
Democratic	John Perez	238	5.6
Write-in		102	2.4
Total votes		4,253	100.0

=== Republican primary ===
==== Nominee ====
- Kristy Marmorato, healthcare worker

==== Eliminated in primary ====
- George Havranek, Bronx Times-Reporter columnist and former member of Bronx Community Board 10
- Hasmine Samantha Zherka, construction business owner and nominee for New York's 34th State Senate district in 2022

==== Disqualified ====
- Grace Marrero
- Phyllis Nastasio, nominee for New York's 80th State Assembly district in 2022
- Ariel Rivera-Diaz, nominee for New York's 87th State Assembly district in 2022, nominee for the 15th district in 2021, and nominee for New York's 86th State Assembly district in 2018

==== Endorsements ====
George Havranek

Individuals

- Curtis Sliwa, founder of the Guardian Angels, radio talk show host, and Republican nominee for Mayor of New York City in 2021 (co-endorsed with Estrada)

Organizations

- New York Young Republican Club
Kristy Marmorato

Local officials

- Joe Borelli, Minority Leader of the New York City Council (2021–present), New York City Councilmember from the 51st district (2015–present), and former New York State Assemblymember from the 62nd district (2013–2015)

Organizations

- Bronx Republican Party

==== Debates ====
2023 New York's 13th City Council district Republican primary debates
No.	Date	Host	Moderator	Link	Republican	Republican	Republican
Key: P Participant A Absent N Not invited I Invited W Withdrawn							
Key: P Participant A Absent N Not invited I Invited W Withdrawn					George Havranek	Kristy Marmorato	Hasime Samantha Zerka
1	Jun. 12, 2023	BronxNet; NYC League of Women Voters	Gary Axelbank	YouTube	P	A	P
2	Jun. 15, 2023	Schneps Media	Robbie Sequeira	YouTube	P	P	P

==== Results ====
New York City's 13th City Council district, 2023 Republican primary
Party	Candidate	Maximum round	Maximum votes	Share in maximum round	Maximum votes First round votes Transfer votes
Republican	Kristy Marmorato	3	952	51.5%	
Republican	George Havranek	3	896	48.5%	
Republican	Hasime Samantha Zerka	2	162	8.5%	
Write-in		1	10	0.5%	

=== Conservative primary ===
==== Nominee ====
- Kristy Marmorato, healthcare worker

==== Eliminated in primary ====
- George Havranek, Bronx Times-Reporter columnist and former member of Bronx Community Board 10
- Hasmine Samantha Zerka, construction business owner and nominee for New York's 34th State Senate district in 2022

==== Endorsements ====
George Havranek

Individuals

- Curtis Sliwa, founder of the Guardian Angels, radio talk show host, and Republican nominee for Mayor of New York City in 2021 (co-endorsed with Estrada)
Kristy Marmorato

Local officials

- Joe Borelli, Minority Leader of the New York City Council (2021–present), New York City Councilmember from the 51st district (2015–present), and former New York State Assemblymember from the 62nd district (2013–2015)

Organizations

- Bronx Republican Party

==== Results ====
Conservative primary results
Party	Candidate	Votes	%
Conservative	Kristy Marmorato	60	54.1
Conservative	George Havranek	35	31.5
Conservative	Hasmine Samantha Zerka	16	14.4
Total votes		111	100.0

=== General election ===
==== Results ====
2023 New York City's 13th City Council district election
Party	Candidate	Votes	%
Republican	Kristy Marmorato	5,775	45.29%
Conservative	Kristy Marmorato	791	6.20%
Total	Kristy Marmorato	6,566	51.50%
Democratic	Marjorie Velázquez (incumbent)	6,103	47.86%
Write-in		83	0.65%
Total votes		12,752	100.0%
Republican gain from Democratic			

== District 14 ==
2023 New York City's 14th City Council district election
- November 7, 2023
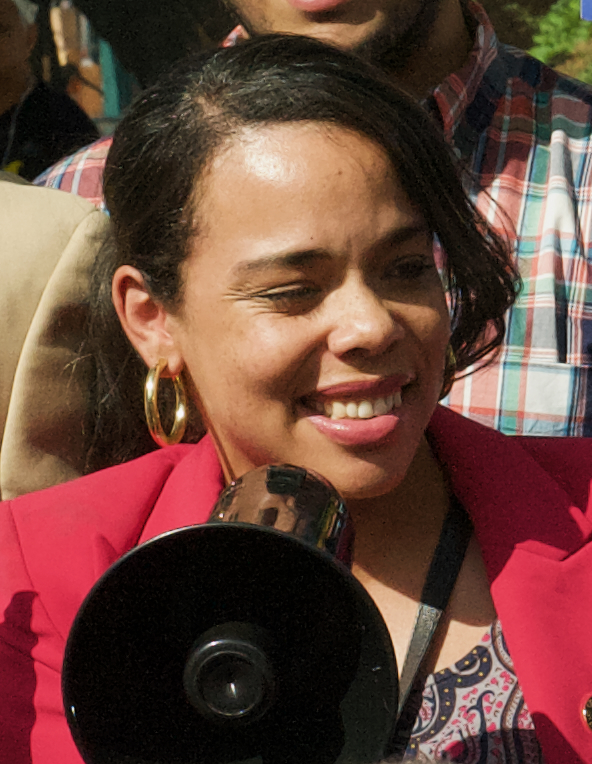

	Majority party	Minority party
Candidate	Pierina Sanchez	Amelia Rose
Party	Democratic	Republican
Alliance	Working Families
Popular vote	3,960	490
Percentage	88.2%	10.9%
Councilmember before election
Pierina Sanchez
Democratic
Elected Councilmember
Pierina Sanchez
Democratic

=== Democratic primary ===
==== Nominee ====
- Pierina Sanchez, incumbent councilmember

==== Eliminated in primary ====
- Rachel Miller-Bradshaw, president of the Northwest Bronx Democrats for Change

==== Endorsements ====
Pierina Sanchez

Labor unions

- Communications Workers of America, District 1
- Council of School Supervisors & Administrators
- District Council 37
- Hotel Trades Council
- International Union of Painters and Allied Trades District Council 9
- LiUNA! New York
- New York City Central Labor Council
- New York City Coalition of the International Union of Operating Engineers
- New York State Nurses Association
- NYC District Council of Carpenters
- Professional Staff Congress CUNY
- SEIU 32BJ

Organizations

- Citizen Action of New York
- The Jewish Vote
- Make the Road Action
- Open New York
- Working Families Party

==== Results ====
Democratic primary results
Party	Candidate	Votes	%
Democratic	Pierina Sanchez (incumbent)	2,439	76.2
Democratic	Rachel Miller-Bradshaw	744	23.3
Write-in		17	0.5
Total votes		3,200	100.0

=== Republican primary ===
==== Nominee ====
- Amelia Rose

=== General election ===
==== Results ====
2023 New York City's 14th City Council district election
Party	Candidate	Votes	%
Democratic	Pierina Sanchez	3,674	81.79%
Working Families	Pierina Sanchez	286	6.37%
Total	Pierina Sanchez (incumbent)	3,960	88.16%
Republican	Amelia Rose	490	10.91%
Write-in		42	0.93%
Total votes		4,492	100.0%
Democratic hold			

== District 15 ==
2023 New York City's 15th City Council district election
- November 7, 2023
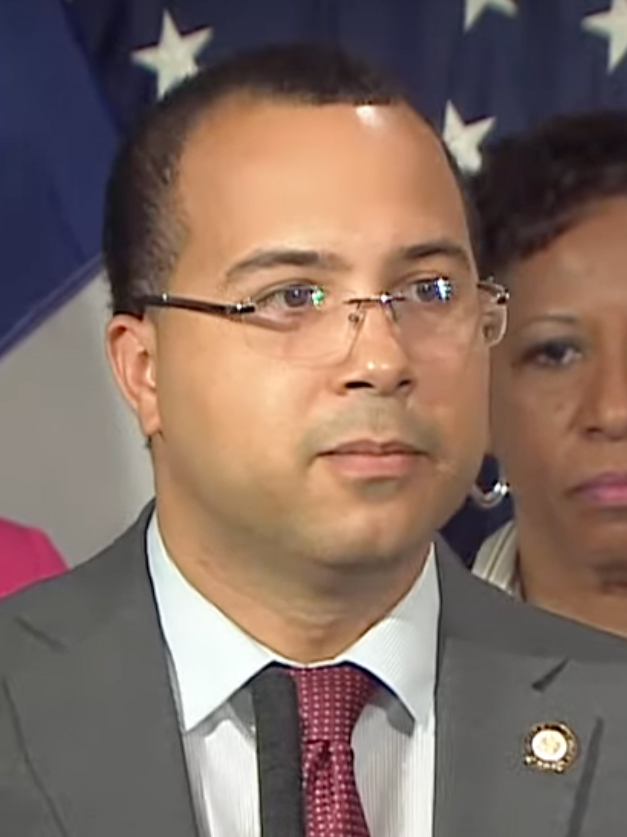

	Majority party	Minority party	Third party
Candidate	Oswald Feliz	Erica Elias	Jose Padilla
Party	Democratic	Republican	Conservative
Alliance	Working Families
Popular vote	3,213	504	275
Percentage	79.8%	12.5%	6.8%
Councilmember before election
Oswald Feliz
Democratic
Elected Councilmember
Oswald Feliz
Democratic

=== Democratic primary ===
==== Nominee ====
- Oswald Feliz, incumbent councilmember

==== Endorsements ====
Oswald Feliz

Labor unions

- Captains Endowment Association
- Council of School Supervisors & Administrators
- Detectives' Endowment Association
- District Council 37
- International Union of Painters and Allied Trades District Council 9
- Lieutenants Benevolent Association
- New York City Central Labor Council
- New York City Coalition of the International Union of Operating Engineers
- New York State Nurses Association
- NYC District Council of Carpenters
- Sergeants Benevolent Association
- United Federation of Teachers

Organizations

- New York League of Conservation Voters
- Stonewall Democratic Club of New York City

=== Republican primary ===
==== Nominee ====
- Erica Elias

=== Conservative primary ===
==== Nominee ====
- Jose A. Padilla Jr., Democratic candidate for this seat in the 2021 special election, Independence Party nominee for New York's 33rd State Senate district in 2014, and Independence Party nominee for New York's 79th State Assembly district in 2012

=== General election ===
==== Results ====
2023 New York City's 15th City Council district election
Party	Candidate	Votes	%
Democratic	Oswald Feliz (incumbent)	3,213	79.81%
Republican	Erica Elias	504	12.52%
Conservative	Jose A. Padilla Jr.	275	6.83%
Write-in		34	0.84%
Total votes		4,026	100.0%
Democratic hold			

== District 16 ==
2023 New York City's 16th City Council district election
- November 7, 2023
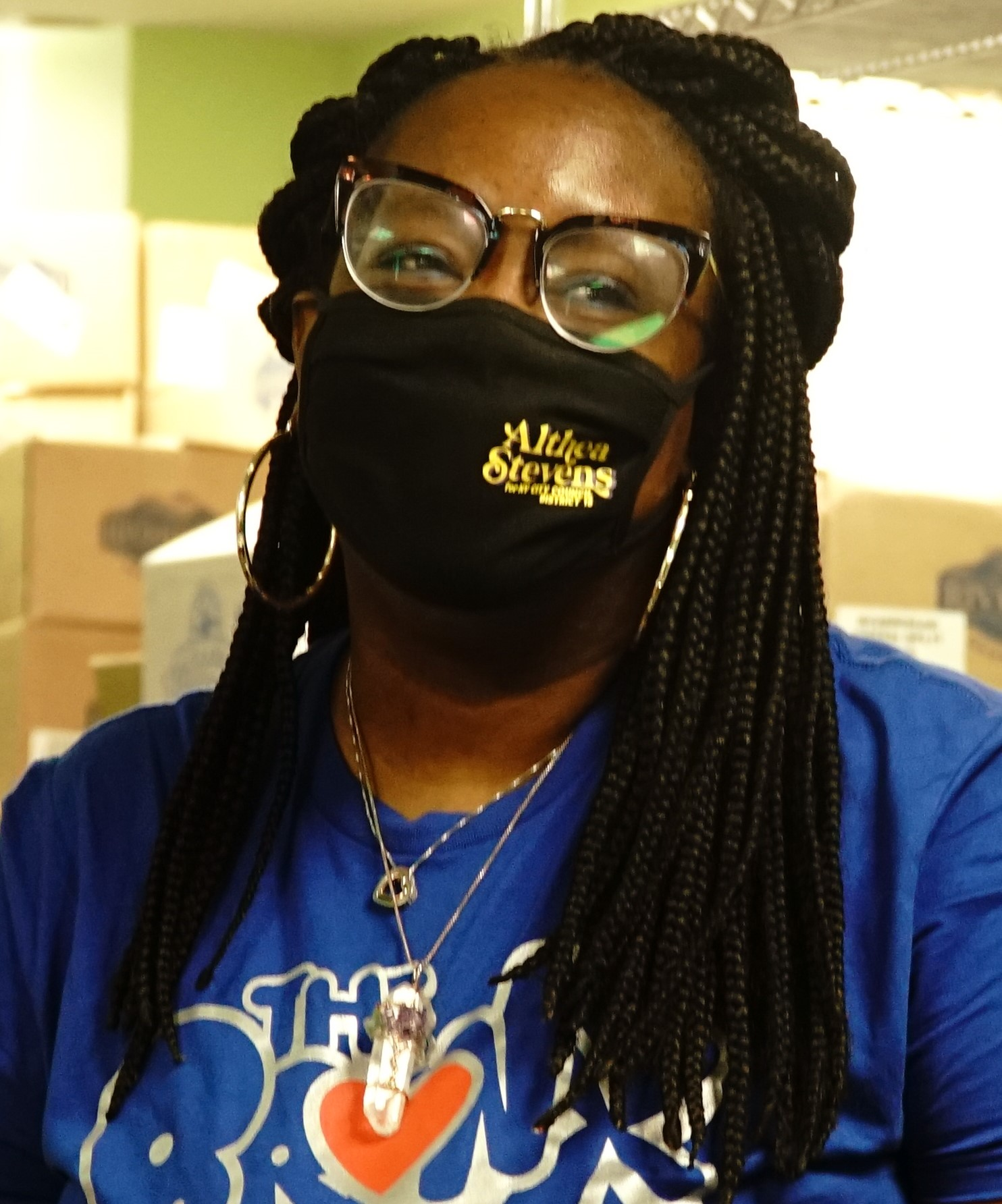

	Majority party	Minority party
Candidate	Althea Stevens	Tanya Carmichael
Party	Democratic	Republican
Popular vote	4,384	702
Percentage	85.4%	13.7%
Councilmember before election
Althea Stevens
Democratic
Elected Councilmember
Althea Stevens
Democratic

=== Democratic primary ===
==== Nominee ====
- Althea Stevens, incumbent councilmember

==== Disqualified ====
- Cynthia Cox, candidate for New York's 79th State Assembly district in 2020

==== Endorsements ====
Althea Stevens

Labor unions

- Council of School Supervisors & Administrators
- District Council 37
- International Union of Painters and Allied Trades District Council 9
- New York City Central Labor Council
- New York City Coalition of the International Union of Operating Engineers
- NYC District Council of Carpenters
- United Federation of Teachers

Organizations

- Citizen Action of New York
- LiUNA! New York
- Our Revolution
- Planned Parenthood of Greater New York Action Fund
- Stonewall Democratic Club of New York City
- Working Families Party

=== Republican primary ===
==== Nominee ====
- Tanya Carmichael, district leader

=== General election ===
==== Results ====
2023 New York City's 16th City Council district election
Party	Candidate	Votes	%
Democratic	Althea Stevens (incumbent)	4,384	85.36%
Republican	Tanya Carmichael	702	13.67%
Write-in		50	0.97%
Total votes		5,136	100.0%
Democratic hold			

== District 17 ==
2023 New York City's 17th City Council district election
- November 7, 2023
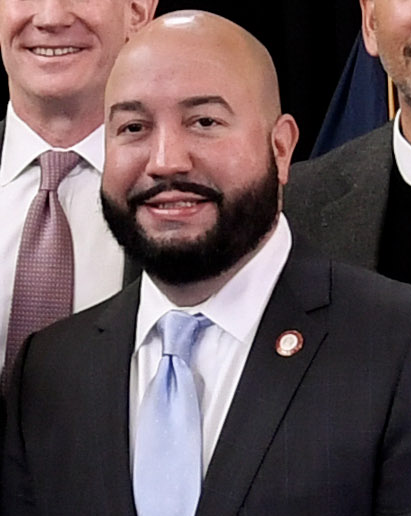

	Majority party	Minority party
Candidate	Rafael Salamanca	Rosaline Nieves
Party	Democratic	Republican
Popular vote	3,693	461
Percentage	84.8%	10.6%
Councilmember before election
Rafael Salamanca
Democratic
Elected Councilmember
Rafael Salamanca
Democratic

=== Democratic primary ===
==== Nominee ====
- Rafael Salamanca, incumbent councilmember

==== Endorsements ====
Rafael Salamanca

Labor unions

- Council of School Supervisors & Administrators
- International Union of Painters and Allied Trades District Council 9
- LiUNA! New York
- New York City Coalition of the International Union of Operating Engineers
- NYC District Council of Carpenters

=== Republican primary ===
==== Nominee ====
- Rosaline Nieves, district leader and New York City Board of Elections staffer

=== Conservative primary ===
==== Nominee ====
- Gonzalo Duran, Marine Corps veteran

=== General election ===
==== Results ====
2023 New York City's 17th City Council district election
Party	Candidate	Votes	%
Democratic	Rafael Salamanca (incumbent)	3,693	84.78%
Republican	Rosaline Nieves	461	10.58%
Conservative	Gonzalo Duran	182	4.18%
Write-in		20	0.46%
Total votes		4,356	100.0%
Democratic hold			

== District 18 ==
2023 New York City's 18th City Council district election
- November 7, 2023
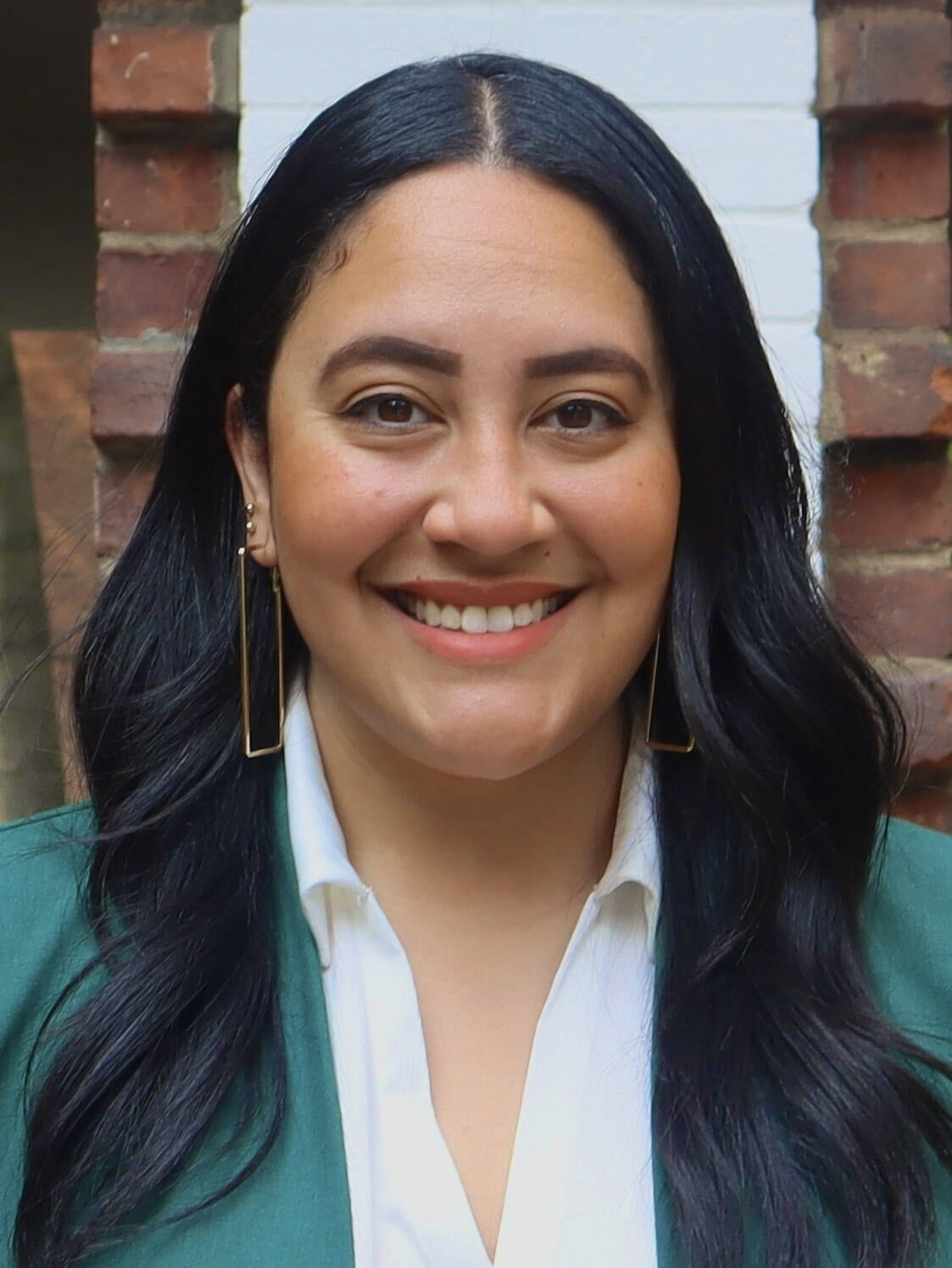

	Majority party	Minority party
Candidate	Amanda Farías	Michelle Castillo
Party	Democratic	Republican
Alliance	Working Families
Popular vote	6,010	775
Percentage	87.8%	11.3%
Councilmember before election
Amanda Farías
Democratic
Elected Councilmember
Amanda Farías
Democratic

=== Democratic primary ===
==== Nominee ====
- Amanda Farias, incumbent councilmember

==== Endorsements ====
Amanda Farias

Labor unions

- Council of School Supervisors & Administrators
- District Council 37
- Freelancers Union
- International Union of Painters and Allied Trades District Council 9
- LiUNA! New York
- New York City Coalition of the International Union of Operating Engineers
- NYC District Council of Carpenters
- Professional Staff Congress CUNY
- United Federation of Teachers

Organizations

- Citizen Action of New York
- Emgage PAC
- The Jewish Vote
- Make the Road Action
- Our Revolution
- Stonewall Democratic Club of New York City
- Working Families Party

=== Republican primary ===
==== Nominee ====
- Michelle Castillo

=== General election ===
==== Results ====
2023 New York City's 18th City Council district election
Party	Candidate	Votes	%
Democratic	Amanda Farias	5,648	82.51%
Working Families	Amanda Farias	362	5.29%
Total	Amanda Farias (incumbent)	6,010	87.80%
Republican	Michelle Castillo	775	11.32%
Write-in		60	0.88%
Total votes		6,845	100.0%
Democratic hold			

== District 19 ==
2023 New York City's 19th City Council district election
- November 7, 2023

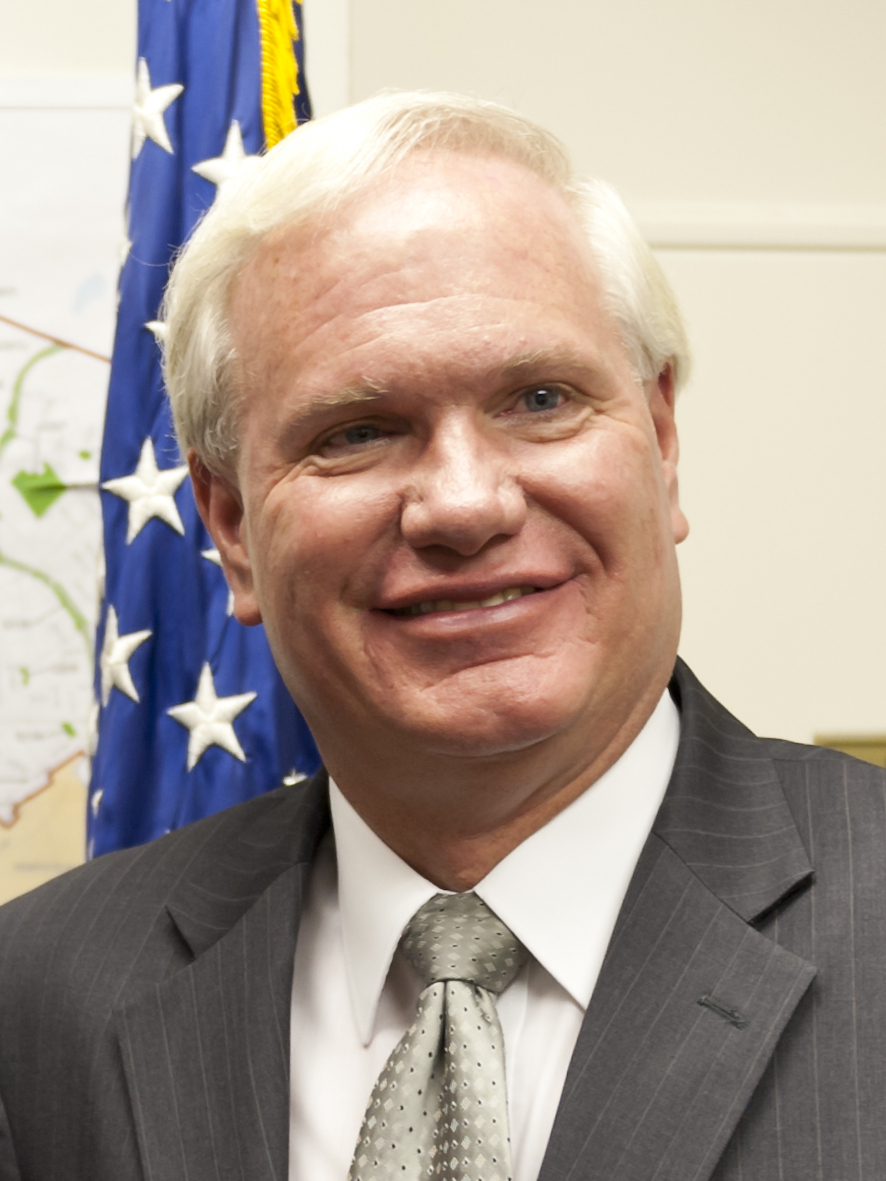
	Majority party	Minority party
Candidate	Vickie Paladino	Tony Avella
Party	Republican	Democratic
Alliance	Conservative
Popular vote	11,861	7,860
Percentage	59.9%	39.7%
Councilmember before election
Vickie Paladino
Republican
Elected Councilmember
Vickie Paladino
Republican

=== Republican primary ===
==== Nominee ====
- Vickie Paladino, incumbent councilmember

==== Endorsements ====
Vickie Paladino

Labor unions

- Correction Officers' Benevolent Association

Organizations

- Conservative Party of New York

=== Democratic primary ===
==== Nominee ====
- Tony Avella, former New York state senator from the 11th district (2011–2018), former New York City Councilmember from the 19th district (2002–2009), and nominee for this seat in 2021

==== Eliminated in primary ====
- Christopher Bae, Assistant District Attorney for the Queens County District Attorney
- Paul Graziano, Reform Party nominee for this seat in 2017

==== Withdrawn ====
- Richard Lee, candidate for this seat in 2021

==== Endorsements ====
Tony Avella

State legislators

- Edward Braunstein, New York State Assemblymember from the 26th district (2011–present)
- Daniel Rosenthal, New York State Assemblymember from the 27th district (2017–2023)
- Toby Ann Stavisky, New York state senator from the 11th district (1999–present)
- David Weprin, New York State Assemblymember from the 24th district (2010–present), former New York City Councilmember from the 23rd district (2002–2009), candidate for New York City Comptroller in 2009 and 2021 and nominee for New York's 9th congressional district in 2011

Labor unions

- Retail, Wholesale and Department Store Union
- United Federation of Teachers (co-endorsement with Bae)

Organizations

- New York League of Conservation Voters
- Queens Democratic Party
Christopher Bae

State legislators

- John Liu, New York state senator from the 16th district (2023–present), former New York state senator from the 11th district (2019–2022), former New York City Comptroller (2010–2013), former New York City Councilmember from the 20th district (2002–2009), candidate for mayor of New York City in 2013
- Jessica Ramos, New York state senator from the 13th district (2019–present)

Labor unions

- Retail, Wholesale and Department Store Union
- United Federation of Teachers (co-endorsement with Avella)

Organizations

- Stonewall Democratic Club of New York City
Paul Graziano

Organizations

==== Debate ====
2023 New York's 19th City Council district Democratic primary debate
No.	Date	Host	Moderator	Link	Democratic	Democratic	Democratic
Key: P Participant A Absent N Not invited I Invited W Withdrawn							
Key: P Participant A Absent N Not invited I Invited W Withdrawn					Tony Avella	Christopher Bae	Paul Graziano
1	Jun. 16, 2023	Schneps Media	Czarinna Andres; Christian Murray	YouTube	A	P	P

==== Results ====
Democratic primary results
Party	Candidate	Maximum round	Maximum votes	Share in maximum round	Maximum votes First round votes Transfer votes
Democratic	Tony Avella	3	2,865	51.1%	
Democratic	Christopher Bae	3	2,742	48.9%	
Democratic	Paul Graziano	2	1,437	24.0%	
Write-in		1	34	0.6%	

=== General election ===
==== Results ====
2023 New York City's 19th City Council district election
Party	Candidate	Votes	%
Republican	Vickie Paladino	10,700	54.06%
Conservative	Vickie Paladino	1,161	5.87%
Total	Vickie Paladino (incumbent)	11,861	59.93%
Democratic	Tony Avella	7,646	38.63%
Taxpayers Unite	Tony Avella	214	1.08%
Total	Tony Avella	7,860	39.72%
Write-in		70	0.35%
Total votes		19,791	100.0%
Republican hold			

== District 20 ==
2023 New York City's 20th City Council district election
- November 7, 2023
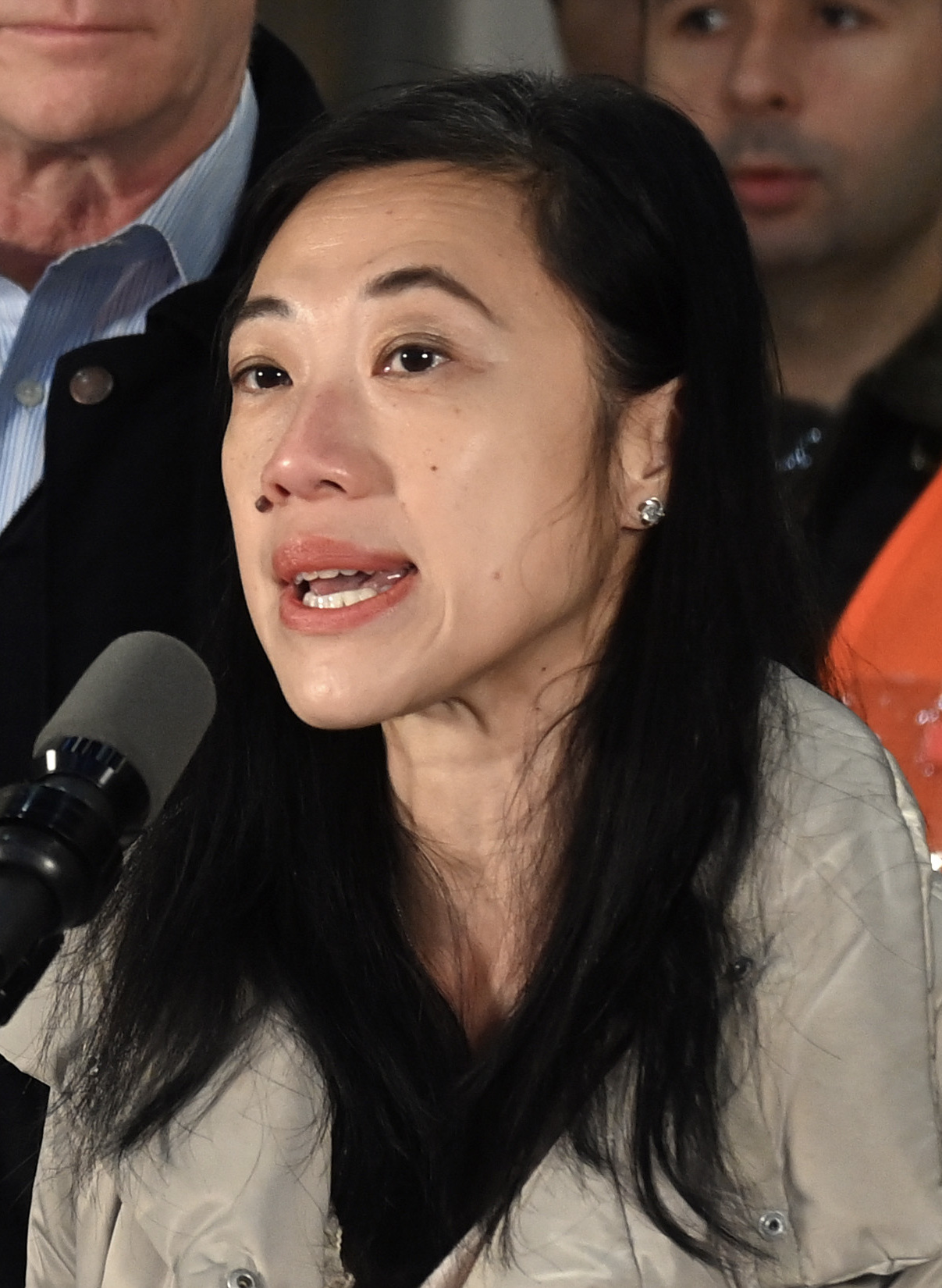

	Majority party	Minority party	Third party
Candidate	Sandra Ung	Yu-Ching James Pai	Jin Liang Chen
Party	Democratic	Republican	Better Flushing
Alliance		Conservative
Popular vote	5,087	2,799	863
Percentage	57.8%	31.8%	9.8%
Councilmember before election
Sandra Ung
Democratic
Elected Councilmember
Sandra Ung
Democratic

=== Democratic primary ===
==== Nominee ====
- Sandra Ung, incumbent councilmember

==== Endorsements ====
Sandra Ung

Labor unions

- Council of School Supervisors & Administrators
- District Council 37
- International Union of Painters and Allied Trades District Council 9
- LiUNA! New York
- New York City Central Labor Council
- New York City Coalition of the International Union of Operating Engineers
- New York State Nurses Association
- NYC District Council of Carpenters
- United Federation of Teachers

Organizations

- EMILY's List
- New York League of Conservation Voters
- Planned Parenthood of Greater New York Action Fund

=== Republican primary ===
==== Nominee ====
- Yu-Ching James Pai, accountant and nominee for this seat in 2021

==== Eliminated in primary ====
- Jin Liang "Dany" Chen, community activist
Yu-Ching James Pai

Organizations

- Conservative Party of New York

==== Results ====
Republican primary results
Party	Candidate	Votes	%
Republican	Yu-Ching James Pai	819	56.0
Republican	Jin Liang Chen	638	43.6
Write-in		6	0.4
Total votes		1,463	100.0

=== Independents and minor parties ===
==== Declared ====
- Jin Liang "Dany" Chen, community activist (lost Republican primary)

=== General election ===
==== Results ====
2023 New York City's 20th City Council district election
Party	Candidate	Votes	%
Democratic	Sandra Ung (incumbent)	5,087	57.82%
Republican	Yu-Ching James Pai	2,524	28.69%
Conservative	Yu-Ching James Pai	275	3.12%
Total	Yu-Ching James Pai	2,799	31.81%
Better Flushing	Jin Liang Chen	863	9.81%
Write-in		49	0.56%
Total votes		8,798	100.0%
Democratic hold			

== District 21 ==
2023 New York City's 21st City Council district election
- November 7, 2023
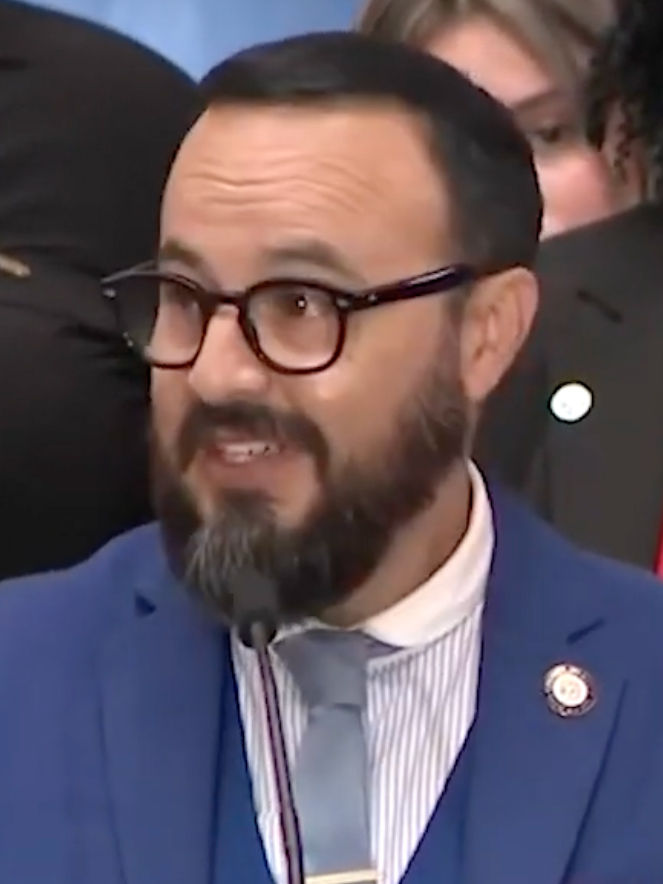
Candidate	Francisco Moya
Party	Democratic
Popular vote	3,062
Percentage	97.0%
Councilmember before election
Francisco Moya
Democratic
Elected Councilmember
Francisco Moya
Democratic

=== Democratic primary ===
==== Nominee ====
- Francisco Moya, incumbent councilmember

==== Disqualified ====
- Hiram Monserrate, former New York state senator from the 13th district (2009–2010) and former New York City Councilmember from this district (2001–2009) (Note: Monserrate is barred from seeking office due to his prior convictions.)

==== Endorsements ====
Francisco Moya

Labor unions

- Freelancers Union
- International Union of Painters and Allied Trades District Council 9
- LiUNA! New York
- New York City Central Labor Council
- New York City Coalition of the International Union of Operating Engineers
- NYC District Council of Carpenters

Organizations

- New York League of Conservation Voters
- Stonewall Democratic Club of New York City

=== General election ===
==== Results ====
2023 New York City's 21st City Council district election
Party	Candidate	Votes	%
Democratic	Francisco Moya (incumbent)	3,062	97.02%
Write-in		94	2.98%
Total votes		3,156	100.0%
Democratic hold			

== District 22 ==
2023 New York City's 22nd City Council district election
- November 7, 2023
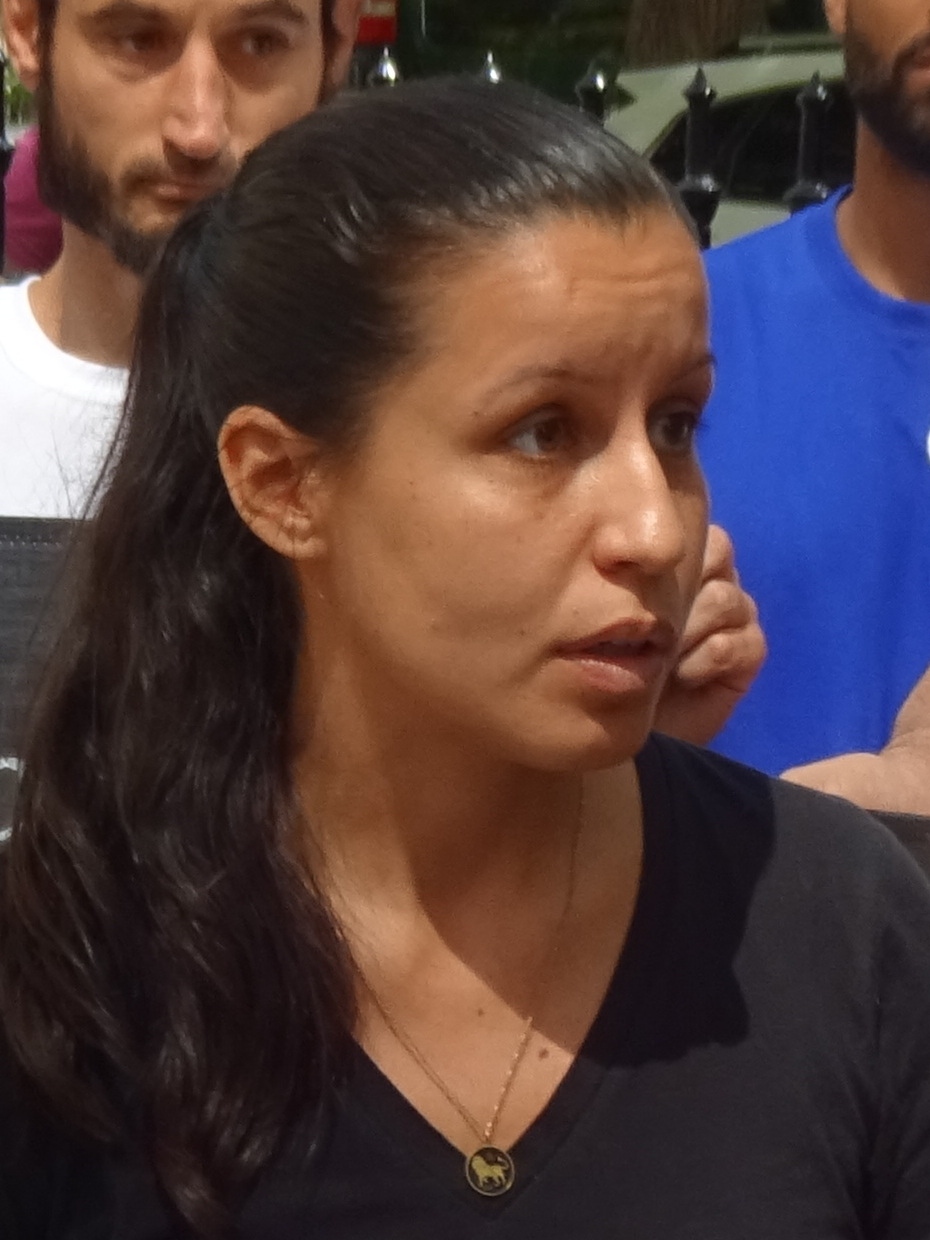

	Majority party	Minority party
Candidate	Tiffany Cabán	Kelly Klingman
Party	Democratic	Republican
Alliance	Working Families	Conservative
Popular vote	9,739	4,204
Percentage	69.3%	29.9%
Councilmember before election
Tiffany Cabán
Democratic
Elected Councilmember
Tiffany Cabán
Democratic

=== Democratic primary ===
==== Nominee ====
- Tiffany Cabán, incumbent councilmember

==== Eliminated in primary ====
- Charles Castro, former Chief of Staff for former Councilmember Hiram Monserrate, former NYPD officer, and candidate for New York's 13th State Senate district in 2002

==== Endorsements ====
Tiffany Cabán

Labor unions

- Council of School Supervisors & Administrators
- Freelancers Union
- International Union of Painters and Allied Trades District Council 9
- LiUNA! New York
- New York City Central Labor Council
- New York State Nurses Association
- NYC District Council of Carpenters
- Professional Staff Congress CUNY
- United Federation of Teachers

Organizations

- Citizen Action of New York
- The Jewish Vote
- LGBTQ Victory Fund
- Make the Road Action
- New York City Democratic Socialists of America
- New York League of Conservation Voters
- Our Revolution
- Planned Parenthood of Greater New York Action Fund
- Run for Something
- Stonewall Democratic Club of New York City
- Sunrise Movement NYC
- Working Families Party

==== Results ====
Democratic primary results
Party	Candidate	Votes	%
Democratic	Tiffany Cabán (incumbent)	5,301	84.8
Democratic	Charles Castro	869	13.9
Write-in		83	1.3
Total votes		6,253	100.0

=== Republican primary ===
==== Nominee ====
- Kelly Klingman, real estate agent

==== Endorsements ====
Kelly Klingman

Individuals

- Curtis Sliwa, founder of the Guardian Angels, radio talk show host, and Republican nominee for Mayor of New York City in 2021

Organizations

- Conservative Party of New York

=== General election ===
==== Results ====
2023 New York City's 22nd City Council district election
Party	Candidate	Votes	%
Democratic	Tiffany Cabán	7,294	51.89%
Working Families	Tiffany Cabán	2,445	17.40%
Total	Tiffany Cabán (incumbent)	9,739	69.29%
Republican	Kelly Klingman	3,789	26.96%
Conservative	Kelly Klingman (Note: Shared with "Animal Welfare" ballot line.)	415	2.95%
Total	Kelly Klingman	4,204	29.91%
Write-in		113	0.80%
Total votes		14,056	100.0%
Democratic hold			

== District 23 ==
2023 New York City's 23rd City Council district election
- November 7, 2023
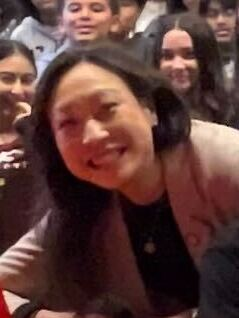

	Majority party	Minority party
Candidate	Linda Lee	Bernard Chow
Party	Democratic	Republican
Alliance		Conservative
Popular vote	9,399	5,223
Percentage	63.3%	35.2%
Councilmember before election
Linda Lee
Democratic
Elected Councilmember
Linda Lee
Democratic

=== Democratic primary ===
==== Nominee ====
- Linda Lee, incumbent councilmember

==== Eliminated in primary ====
- Steve Behar, staffer for former Councilmember Barry Grodenchik and candidate for this seat in 2021
- Rubaiya Rahman, executive director of the Autism Society Habilitation Organization

==== Declined ====
- Jaslin Kaur, candidate for this seat in 2021

==== Endorsements ====
Linda Lee

Local officials

- Adrienne Adams, Speaker of the New York City Council (2022–present) and New York City Councilmember from the 28th district (2017–present)

Labor unions

- Captains Endowment Association
- Communications Workers of America, District 1
- Council of School Supervisors & Administrators
- Detectives' Endowment Association
- District Council 37
- Hotel Trades Council
- International Union of Painters and Allied Trades District Council 9
- Lieutenants Benevolent Association
- LiUNA! New York
- New York City Central Labor Council
- New York City Coalition of the International Union of Operating Engineers
- New York State Nurses Association
- NYC District Council of Carpenters
- SEIU 32BJ
- Sergeants Benevolent Association

Organizations

- EMILY's List
- New York League of Conservation Voters
- Planned Parenthood of Greater New York Action Fund
- Stonewall Democratic Club of New York City

==== Debate ====
2023 New York's 23rd City Council district Democratic primary debate
No.	Date	Host	Moderator	Link	Democratic	Democratic	Democratic
Key: P Participant A Absent N Not invited I Invited W Withdrawn							
Key: P Participant A Absent N Not invited I Invited W Withdrawn					Steve Behar	Linda Lee	Rubaiya Rahman
1	Jun. 16, 2023	Schneps Media	Czarinna Andres; Christian Murray	YouTube	P	P	P

==== Results ====
Democratic primary results
Party	Candidate	Votes	%
Democratic	Linda Lee (incumbent)	4,113	62.6
Democratic	Steve Behar	1,917	29.2
Democratic	Rubaiya Rahman	490	7.5
Write-in		47	0.7
Total votes		6,567	100.0

=== Republican primary ===
==== Nominee ====
- Bernard Chow, marketing agent and SHSAT activist

==== Endorsements ====
Bernard Chow
- Conservative Party of New York

=== General election ===
==== Results ====
2023 New York City's 23rd City Council district election
Party	Candidate	Votes	%
Democratic	Linda Lee (incumbent)	9,399	63.33%
Republican	Bernard Chow	4,703	31.69%
Conservative	Bernard Chow	520	3.50%
Total	Bernard Chow	5,223	35.19%
Write-in		219	1.48%
Total votes		14,841	100.0%
Democratic hold			

== District 24 ==
2023 New York City's 24th City Council district election
- November 7, 2023
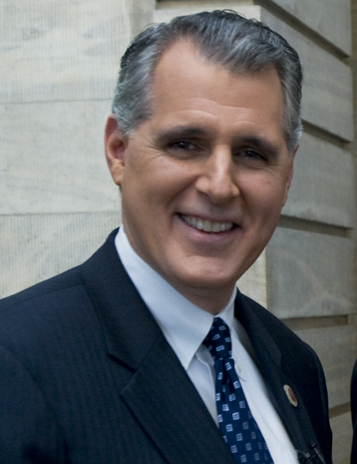

	Majority party	Minority party
Candidate	James F. Gennaro	Jonathan Rinaldi
Party	Democratic	Republican
Alliance		Conservative
Popular vote	7,383	2,322
Percentage	74.3%	23.4%
Councilmember before election
James F. Gennaro
Democratic
Elected Councilmember
James F. Gennaro
Democratic

=== Democratic primary ===
==== Nominee ====
- James F. Gennaro, incumbent councilmember

==== Disqualified ====
- Rabby Syed, social worker

==== Endorsements ====
James F. Gennaro

Labor unions

- District Council 37
- International Union of Painters and Allied Trades District Council 9
- LiUNA! New York
- New York City Central Labor Council
- New York City Coalition of the International Union of Operating Engineers
- New York State Nurses Association
- NYC District Council of Carpenters

Organizations

- New York League of Conservation Voters
- Stonewall Democratic Club of New York City

=== Republican primary ===
==== Nominee ====
- Jonathan Rinaldi, activist and serial sperm donor

=== General election ===
==== Results ====
2023 New York City's 24th City Council district election
Party	Candidate	Votes	%
Democratic	James F. Gennaro (incumbent)	7,383	74.34%
Republican	Jonathan Rinaldi	2,045	20.59%
Conservative	Jonathan Rinaldi (Note: Shared with "Parent Party" ballot line.)	277	2.79%
Total	Jonathan Rinaldi	2,322	23.38%
Write-in		226	2.28%
Total votes		9,931	100.0%
Democratic hold			

== District 25 ==
2023 New York City's 25th City Council district election
- November 7, 2023
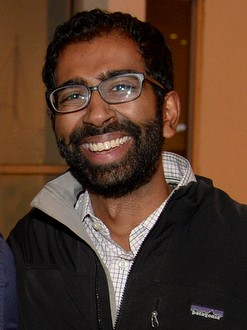

	Majority party	Minority party	Third party
Candidate	Shekar Krishnan	Zhile Cao	Fatima Baryab
Party	Democratic	Republican	Diversity
Alliance	Working Families
Popular vote	5,887	1,924	1,037
Percentage	64.9%	21.2%	11.4%
Councilmember before election
Shekar Krishnan
Democratic
Elected Councilmember
Shekar Krishnan
Democratic

=== Democratic primary ===
==== Nominee ====
- Shekar Krishnan, incumbent councilmember

==== Eliminated in primary ====
- Fatima Baryab, non-profit executive and candidate for this seat in 2021
- Ricardo Pacheco, leader of the Jackson Heights Coop Alliance

==== Endorsements ====
Shekar Krishnan

Labor unions

- Council of School Supervisors & Administrators
- District Council 37
- LiUNA! New York
- New York City Central Labor Council
- New York City Coalition of the International Union of Operating Engineers
- New York State Nurses Association
- NYC District Council of Carpenters
- Professional Staff Congress CUNY

Organizations

- Jim Owles Liberal Democratic Club
- Make the Road Action
- New York League of Conservation Voters
- Planned Parenthood of Greater New York Action Fund
- Stonewall Democratic Club of New York City
- Working Families Party

==== Results ====
Democratic primary results
Party	Candidate	Votes	%
Democratic	Shekar Krishnan (incumbent)	3,405	62.1
Democratic	Ricardo Pacheco	1,308	23.9
Democratic	Fatima Baryab	740	13.5
Write-in		31	0.6
Total votes		5,484	100.0

=== Republican primary ===
==== Nominee ====
- Zhile Cao, veteran

=== Independents and minor parties ===
==== Declared ====
- Fatima Baryab, non-profit executive and candidate for this seat in 2021 (lost Democratic primary)

=== General election ===
==== Results ====
2023 New York City's 25th City Council district election
Party	Candidate	Votes	%
Democratic	Shekar Krishnan	4,981	54.87%
Working Families	Shekar Krishnan	906	9.98%
Total	Shekar Krishnan (incumbent)	5,887	64.85%
Republican	Zhile Cao	1,829	20.15%
Medical Freedom	Zhile Cao	95	1.05%
Total	Zhile Cao	1,924	21.20%
Diversity	Fatima Baryab	1,037	11.42%
Write-in		230	2.53%
Total votes		9,078	100.0%
Democratic hold			

== District 26 ==
2023 New York City's 26th City Council district election
- November 7, 2023
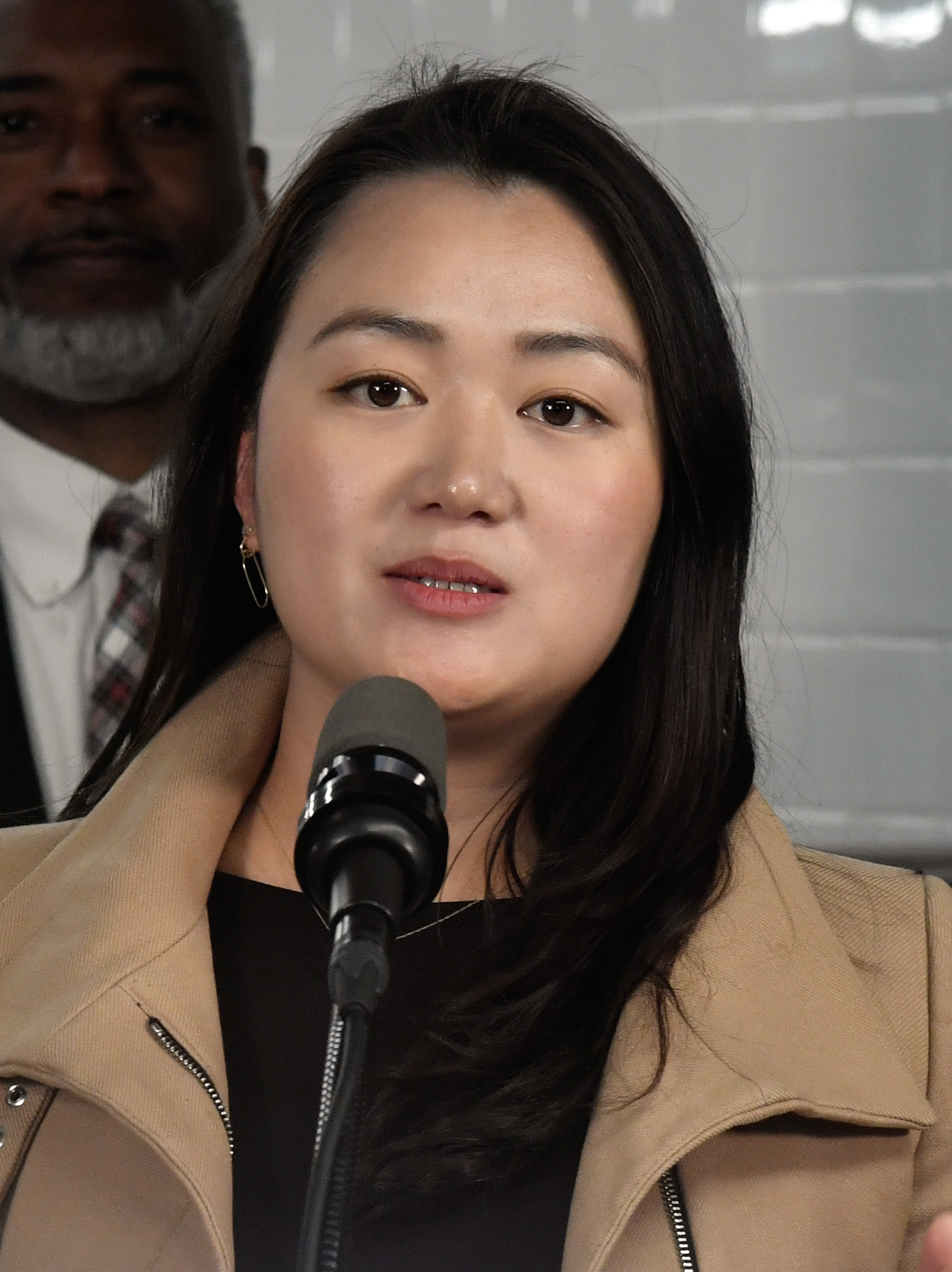

	Majority party	Minority party
Candidate	Julie Won	Marvin Jeffcoat
Party	Democratic	Republican
Alliance	Working Families
Popular vote	8,454	2,138
Percentage	78.9%	20.0%
Councilmember before election
Julie Won
Democratic
Elected Councilmember
Julie Won
Democratic

=== Democratic primary ===
==== Nominee ====
- Julie Won, incumbent councilmember

==== Eliminated in primary ====
- Hailie Kim, former adjunct professor at Hunter College, candidate for this seat in 2021, former staff member at MinKwon Center for Community Action

==== Withdrawn ====
- Lorenzo Brea, activist and candidate for this seat in 2021

==== Endorsements ====
Julie Won

Labor unions

- Council of School Supervisors & Administrators
- District Council 37
- International Union of Painters and Allied Trades District Council 9
- LiUNA! New York
- New York City Central Labor Council
- New York State Nurses Association
- NYC District Council of Carpenters
- Professional Staff Congress CUNY

Organizations

- Citizens Union
- Jim Owles Liberal Democratic Club
- New York League of Conservation Voters
- Planned Parenthood of Greater New York Action Fund
- Stonewall Democratic Club of New York City
- Working Families Party
Declined to endorse

Labor unions

- Communications Workers of America, District 1
- Hotel Trades Council
- SEIU 32BJ

==== Debate ====
2023 New York's 26th City Council district Democratic primary debate
No.	Date	Host	Moderator	Link	Democratic	Democratic	Democratic
Key: P Participant A Absent N Not invited I Invited W Withdrawn							
Key: P Participant A Absent N Not invited I Invited W Withdrawn					Lorenzo Brea	Hailie Kim	Julie Won
1	Jun. 13, 2023	Schneps Media	Czarinna Andres; Christian Murray	YouTube	N	P	P

==== Results ====
Democratic primary results
Party	Candidate	Votes	%
Democratic	Julie Won (incumbent)	3,701	60.9
Democratic	Hailie Kim	2,298	37.8
Write-in		76	1.3
Total votes		6,075	100.0

=== Republican primary ===
==== Nominee ====
- Marvin Jeffcoat, veteran and nominee for this seat in 2017 and 2021

=== General election ===
==== Results ====
2023 New York City's 26th City Council district election
Party	Candidate	Votes	%
Democratic	Julie Won	6,930	64.70%
Working Families	Julie Won	1,524	14.23%
Total	Julie Won (incumbent)	8,454	78.93%
Republican	Marvin Jeffcoat	2,020	18.86%
Medical Freedom	Marvin Jeffcoat	118	1.10%
Total	Marvin Jeffcoat	2,138	19.96%
Write-in		119	1.11%
Total votes		10,711	100.0%
Democratic hold			

== District 27 ==
2023 New York City's 27th City Council district election
- November 7, 2023
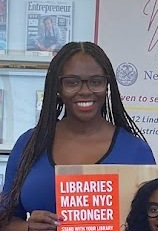

	Majority party	Minority party
Candidate	Nantasha Williams	Marilyn Miller
Party	Democratic	Republican
Popular vote	8,881	663
Percentage	92.5%	6.9%
Councilmember before election
Nantasha Williams
Democratic
Elected Councilmember
Nantasha Williams
Democratic

=== Democratic primary ===
==== Nominee ====
- Nantasha Williams, incumbent councilmember

==== Disqualified ====
- Jabari Bell, managing partner at Walter & Wells Real Estate Group
- Joanne Moreno, educator

==== Endorsements ====
Nantasha Williams

Labor unions

- Council of School Supervisors & Administrators
- District Council 37
- International Union of Painters and Allied Trades District Council 9
- New York City Central Labor Council
- New York City Coalition of the International Union of Operating Engineers
- New York State Nurses Association
- NYC District Council of Carpenters
- Professional Staff Congress CUNY

Organizations

- Citizen Action of New York
- Moms Demand Action
- New York League of Conservation Voters
- Stonewall Democratic Club of New York City

=== Republican primary ===
==== Nominee ====
- Marilyn Miller, retired police officer and nominee for New York's 32nd State Assembly district in 2022

=== General election ===
==== Results ====
2023 New York City's 27th City Council district election
Party	Candidate	Votes	%
Democratic	Nantasha Williams (incumbent)	8,881	92.47%
Republican	Marilyn Miller	589	6.13%
Medical Freedom	Marilyn Miller	74	0.77%
Total	Marilyn Miller	663	6.90%
Write-in		60	0.63%
Total votes		9,604	100.0%
Democratic hold			

== District 28 ==
2023 New York City's 28th City Council district election
- November 7, 2023
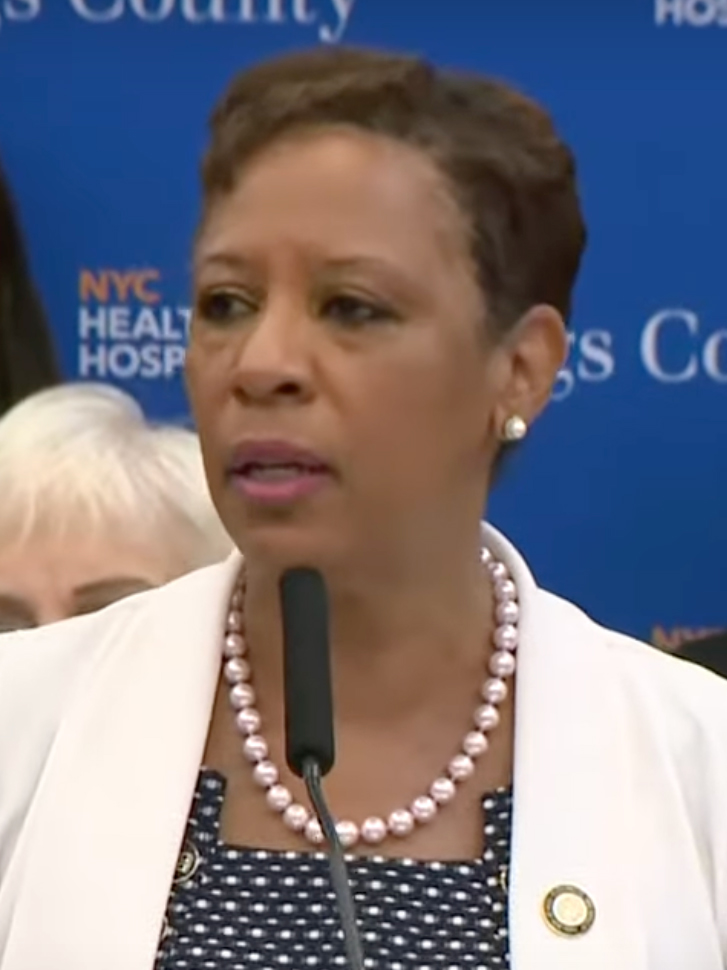

	Majority party	Minority party
Candidate	Adrienne Adams	Rusat Ramgopal
Party	Democratic	Republican
Popular vote	6,521	1,079
Percentage	85.0%	14.1%
Councilmember before election
Adrienne Adams
Democratic
Elected Councilmember
Adrienne Adams
Democratic

=== Democratic primary ===
==== Nominee ====
- Adrienne Adams, incumbent councilmember

==== Endorsements ====
Adrienne Adams

Labor unions

- Communications Workers of America, District 1
- Council of School Supervisors & Administrators
- District Council 37
- Freelancers Union
- Hotel Trades Council
- International Union of Painters and Allied Trades District Council 9
- LiUNA! New York
- New York City Central Labor Council
- New York City Coalition of the International Union of Operating Engineers
- New York State Nurses Association
- NYC District Council of Carpenters
- SEIU 32BJ

Organizations

- Emgage PAC
- Planned Parenthood of Greater New York Action Fund

=== Republican primary ===
==== Nominee ====
- Rusat Ramgopal, member of Queens Community Board 10

=== General election ===
==== Results ====
2023 New York City's 28th City Council district election
Party	Candidate	Votes	%
Democratic	Adrienne Adams (incumbent)	6,521	85.00%
Republican	Rusat Ramgopal	1,019	13.28%
Common Sense	Rusat Ramgopal	60	0.78%
Total	Rusat Ramgopal	1,079	14.06%
Write-in		72	0.94%
Total votes		7,672	100.0%
Democratic hold			

== District 29 ==
2023 New York City's 29th City Council district election
- November 7, 2023
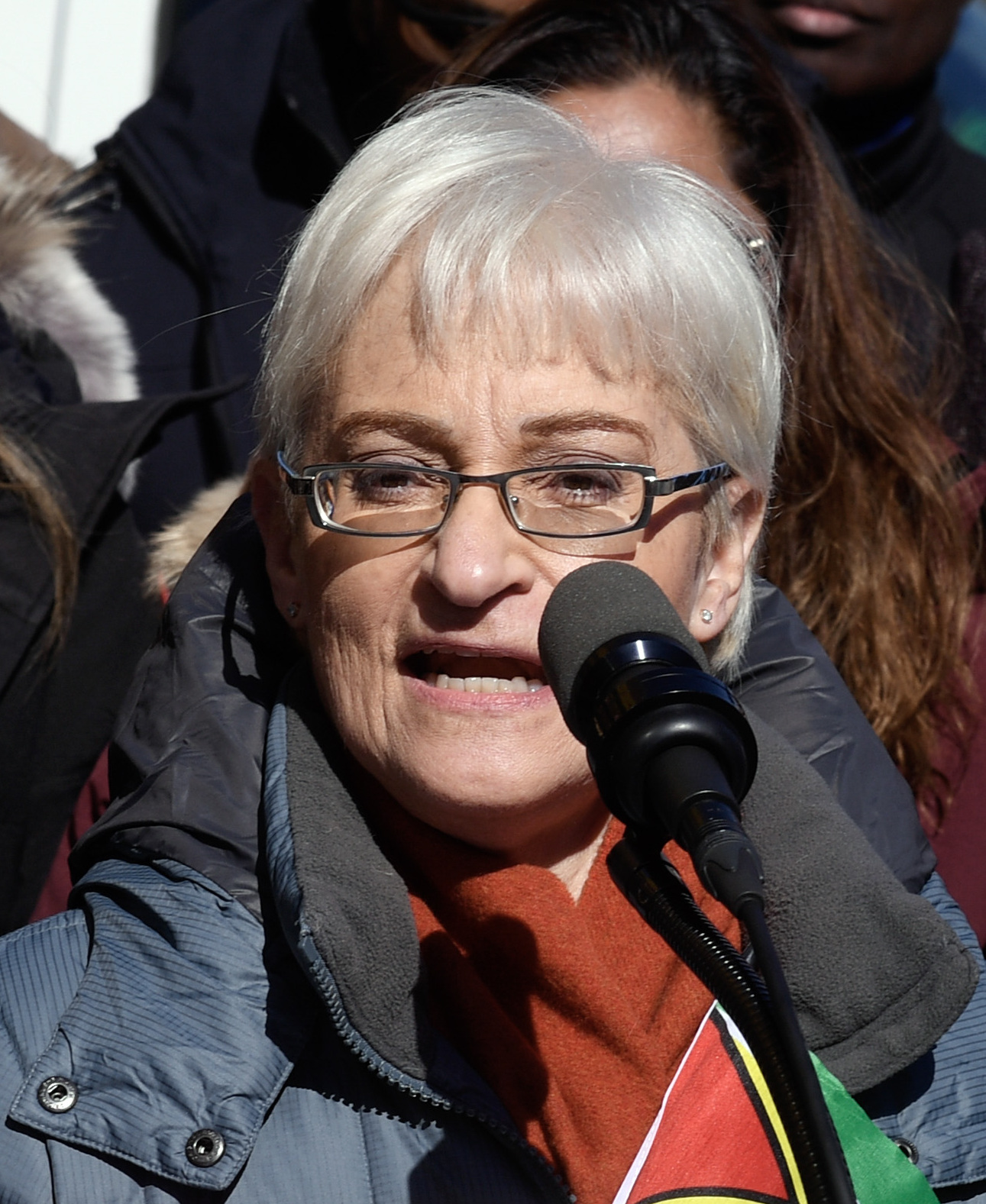

	Majority party	Minority party
Candidate	Lynn Schulman	Danniel Maio
Party	Democratic	Republican
Alliance		Conservative
Popular vote	8,195	3,252
Percentage	68.1%	27.0%
Councilmember before election
Lynn Schulman
Democratic
Elected Councilmember
Lynn Schulman
Democratic

=== Democratic primary ===
==== Nominee ====
- Lynn Schulman, incumbent councilmember

==== Eliminated in primary ====
- Ethan Felder, candidate for New York's 28th State Assembly district in 2022
- Sukhi Singh, candidate for District Leader of New York's 24th State Assembly district in 2022

==== Endorsements ====
Lynn Schulman

State officials

- Letitia James, Attorney General of New York (2019–present), former New York City Public Advocate (2014–2019), and former New York City Councilmember from the 35th district (2004–2013)

Local officials

- Jumaane Williams, New York City Public Advocate (2019–present), former New York City Councilmember from the 45th district (2010–2019), candidate for lieutenant governor of New York in 2018 and candidate for governor of New York in 2022 New York gubernatorial election

Labor unions

- 1199SEIU
- Communications Workers of America, District 1
- Council of School Supervisors & Administrators
- District Council 37
- Freelancers Union
- Hotel Trades Council
- International Union of Painters and Allied Trades District Council 9
- New York City Central Labor Council
- New York City Coalition of the International Union of Operating Engineers
- New York State Nurses Association
- NYC District Council of Carpenters
- SEIU 32BJ

Organizations

- Citizens Union
- EMILY's List
- Jim Owles Liberal Democratic Club
- LGBTQ Victory Fund
- New York League of Conservation Voters
- Planned Parenthood of Greater New York Action Fund
- Stonewall Democratic Club of New York City

==== Results ====
Democratic primary results
Party	Candidate	Votes	%
Democratic	Lynn Schulman (incumbent)	3,474	54.2
Democratic	Ethan Felder	2,203	34.4
Democratic	Sukhi Singh	682	10.6
Write-in		50	0.8
Total votes		6,409	100.0

=== Republican primary ===
==== Nominee ====
- Danniel Maio, map-maker and perennial candidate

==== Endorsements ====
Danniel Maio

Organizations

- Conservative Party of New York

=== Independents and minor parties ===
==== Declared ====
- Sukhi Singh, candidate for District Leader of New York's 24th State Assembly district in 2022 (lost Democratic primary)

=== General election ===
==== Results ====
2023 New York City's 29th City Council district election
Party	Candidate	Votes	%
Democratic	Lynn Schulman (incumbent)	8,195	68.09%
Republican	Danniel Maio	2,917	24.24%
Conservative	Danniel Maio	335	2.78%
Total	Danniel Maio	3,252	27.02%
Common Sense	Sukhi Singh	512	4.25%
Write-in		76	0.63%
Total votes		12,035	100.0%
Democratic hold			

== District 30 ==
2023 New York City's 30th City Council district election
- November 7, 2023
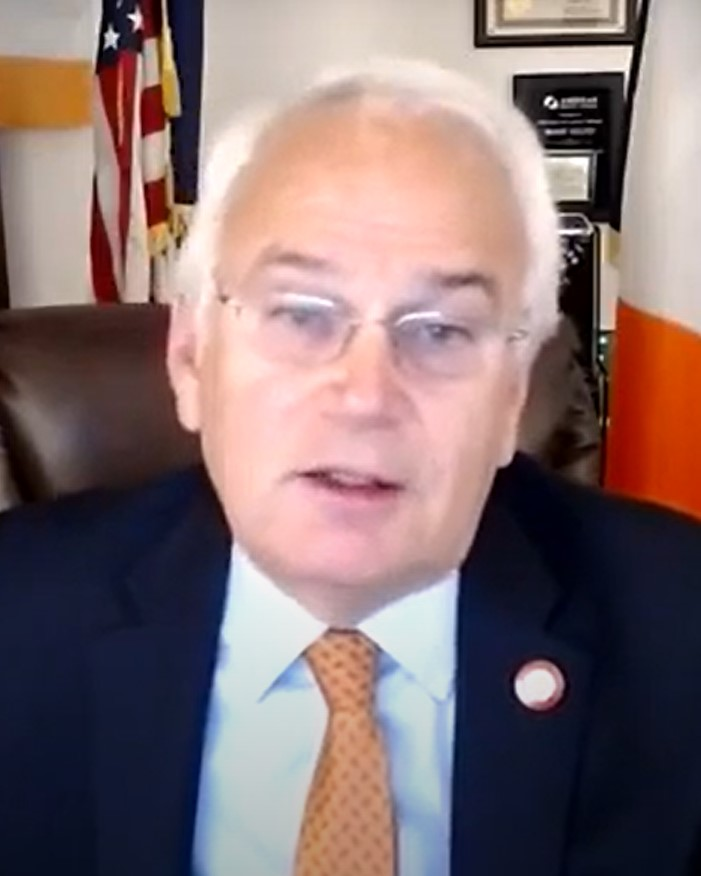
	Majority party
Candidate	Robert Holden
Party	Democratic
Alliance	Republican; Conservative
Popular vote	7,803
Percentage	96.2%
Councilmember before election
Robert Holden
Democratic
Elected Councilmember
Robert Holden
Democratic

=== Democratic primary ===
==== Nominee ====
- Robert Holden, incumbent councilmember

==== Endorsements ====
Robert Holden

Labor unions

- International Union of Painters and Allied Trades District Council 9
- LiUNA! New York
- New York City Coalition of the International Union of Operating Engineers
- NYC District Council of Carpenters
- United Federation of Teachers

Organizations

- New York League of Conservation Voters

=== Republican primary ===
==== Nominee ====
- Robert Holden, incumbent councilmember

==== Endorsements ====
Robert Holden

Labor unions

- International Union of Painters and Allied Trades District Council 9
- LiUNA! New York
- New York City Coalition of the International Union of Operating Engineers
- NYC District Council of Carpenters
- United Federation of Teachers

Organizations

- New York League of Conservation Voters

=== General election ===
==== Results ====
2023 New York City's 30th City Council district election
Party	Candidate	Votes	%
Democratic	Robert Holden	3,915	48.26%
Republican	Robert Holden	3,435	42.35%
Conservative	Robert Holden	453	5.58%
Total	Robert Holden (incumbent)	7,803	96.19%
Write-in		309	3.81%
Total votes		8,112	100.0%
Democratic hold			

== District 31 ==
2023 New York City's 31st City Council district election
- November 7, 2023
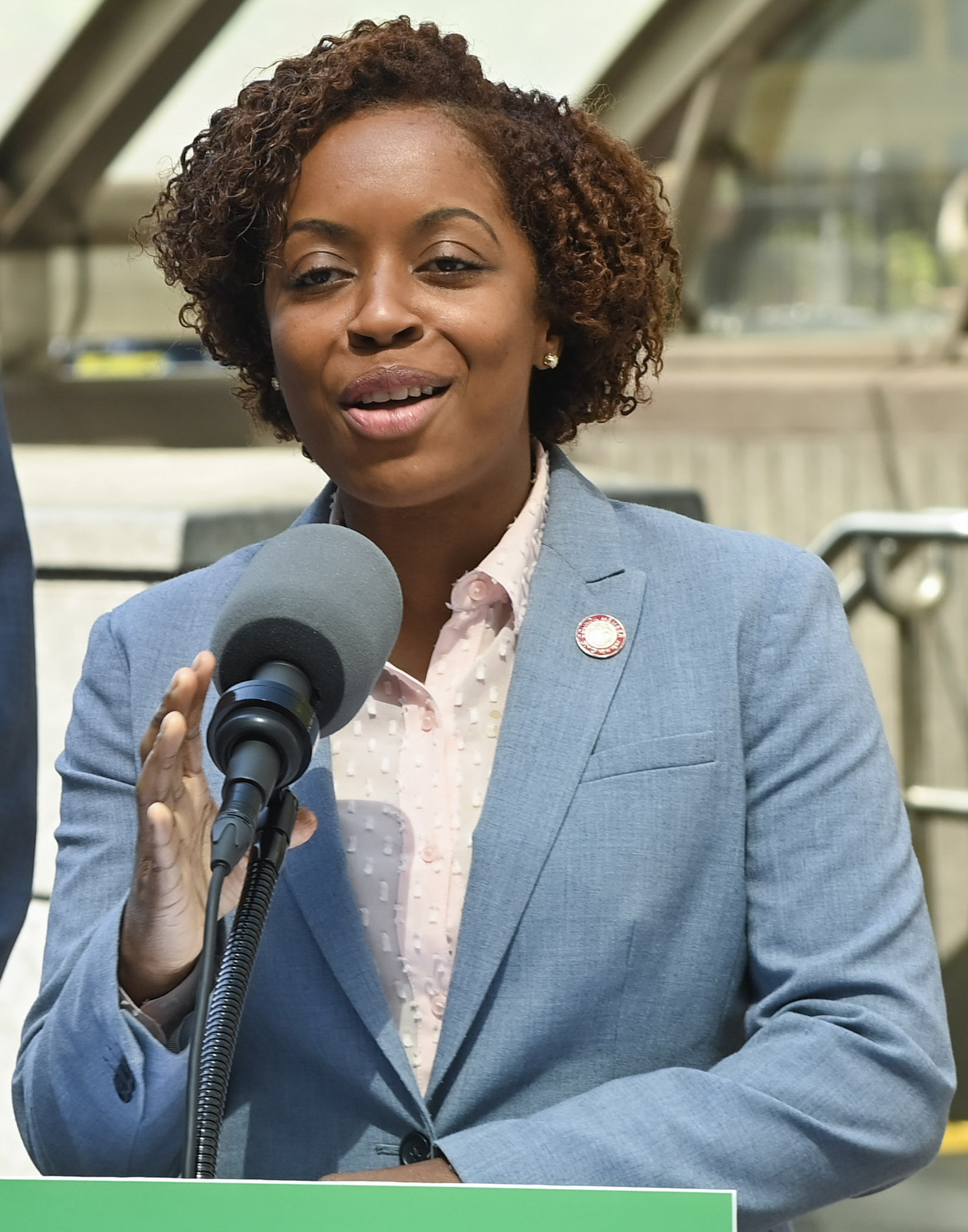

	Majority party	Minority party
Candidate	Selvena Brooks-Powers	Daniella May
Party	Democratic	Republican
Popular vote	8,868	1,053
Percentage	89.2%	10.6%
Councilmember before election
Selvena Brooks-Powers
Democratic
Elected Councilmember
Selvena Brooks-Powers
Democratic

=== Democratic primary ===
==== Nominee ====
- Selvena Brooks-Powers, incumbent councilmember

==== Endorsements ====
Selvena Brooks-Powers

Labor unions

- Council of School Supervisors & Administrators
- District Council 37
- International Union of Painters and Allied Trades District Council 9
- LiUNA! New York
- New York City Central Labor Council
- New York City Coalition of the International Union of Operating Engineers
- New York State Nurses Association
- NYC District Council of Carpenters

Organizations

- New York League of Conservation Voters
- Planned Parenthood of Greater New York Action Fund

=== Republican primary ===
==== Nominee ====
- Daniella May, plastic surgery nurse

=== General election ===
==== Results ====
2023 New York City's 31st City Council district election
Party	Candidate	Votes	%
Democratic	Selvena Brooks-Powers (incumbent)	8,868	89.16%
Republican	Daniella May	972	9.77%
Mad As Hell	Daniella May	81	0.81%
Total	Daniella May	1,053	10.59%
Write-in		25	0.25%
Total votes		9,946	100.0%
Democratic hold			

== District 32 ==
2023 New York City's 32nd City Council district election
- November 7, 2023
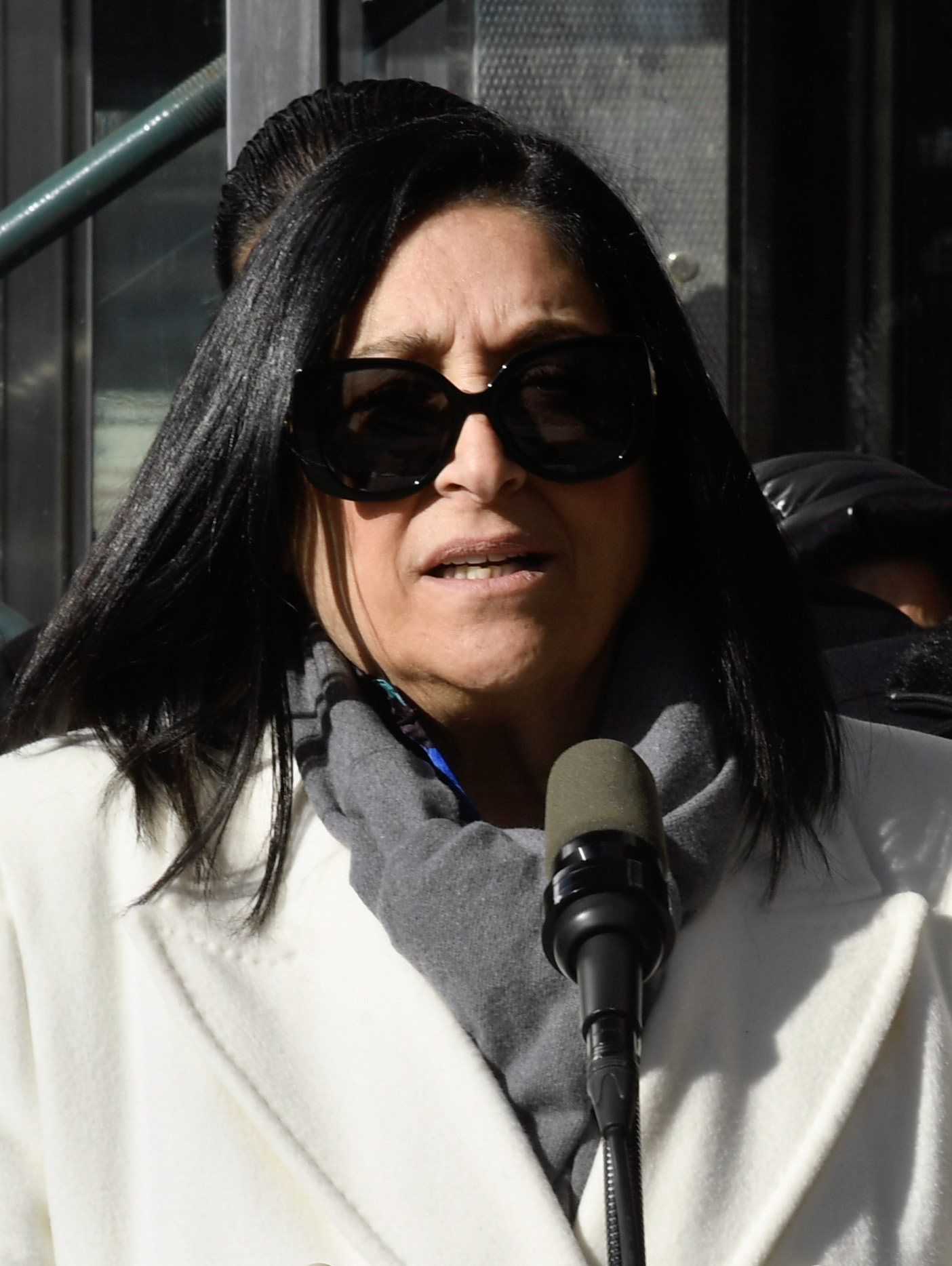
	Majority party
Candidate	Joann Ariola
Party	Republican
Alliance	Conservative
Popular vote	8,982
Percentage	95.1%
Councilmember before election
Joann Ariola
Republican
Elected Councilmember
Joann Ariola
Republican

=== Republican primary ===
==== Nominee ====
- Joann Ariola, incumbent councilmember

==== Endorsements ====
Joann Ariola

Labor unions

- Captains Endowment Association
- Detectives' Endowment Association
- International Union of Painters and Allied Trades District Council 9
- Lieutenants Benevolent Association
- LiUNA! New York
- New York City Coalition of the International Union of Operating Engineers
- NYC District Council of Carpenters
- Sergeants Benevolent Association

Organizations

- Conservative Party of New York

=== Democratic primary ===
==== Withdrawn ====
- Michael Scala, attorney, candidate for this seat in 2021, nominee for this seat in 2017

=== General election ===
==== Results ====
2023 New York City's 32nd City Council district election
Party	Candidate	Votes	%
Republican	Joann Ariola	7,568	80.17%
Conservative	Joann Ariola	1,414	14.98%
Total	Joann Ariola (incumbent)	8,982	95.15%
Write-in		458	4.85%
Total votes		9,440	100.0%
Republican hold			

== District 33 ==
2023 New York City's 33rd City Council district election
- November 7, 2023
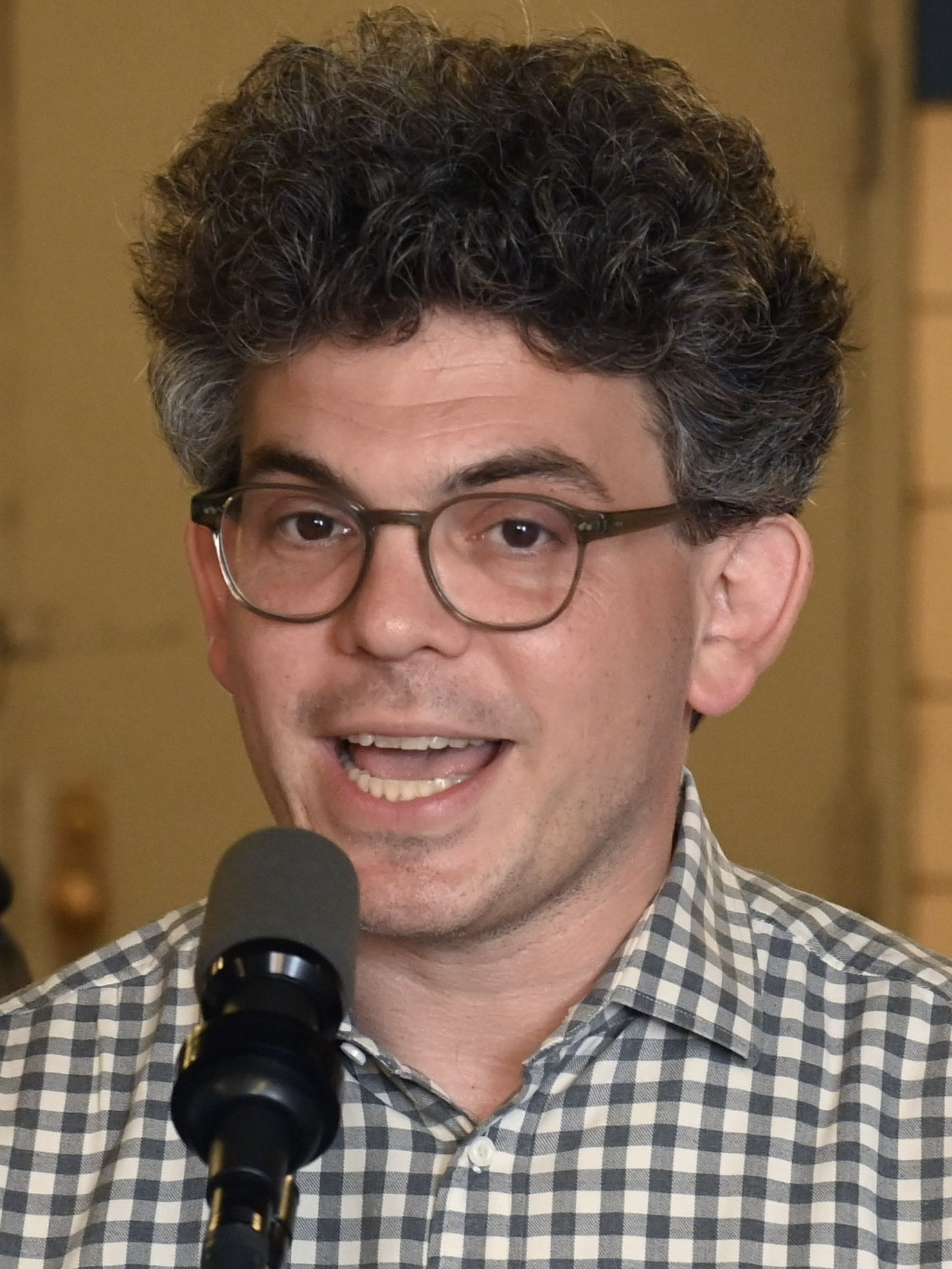

	Majority party	Minority party
Candidate	Lincoln Restler	Martha Rowen
Party	Democratic	Republican
Alliance	Working Families	Conservative
Popular vote	10,925	1,518
Percentage	87.0%	12.1%
Councilmember before election
Lincoln Restler
Democratic
Elected Councilmember
Lincoln Restler
Democratic

=== Democratic primary ===
==== Nominee ====
- Lincoln Restler, incumbent councilmember

==== Endorsements ====
Lincoln Restler

Labor unions

- Council of School Supervisors & Administrators
- District Council 37
- Freelancers Union
- International Union of Painters and Allied Trades District Council 9
- New York State Nurses Association
- NYC District Council of Carpenters
- United Federation of Teachers

Organizations

- Citizen Action of New York
- The Jewish Vote
- Jim Owles Liberal Democratic Club
- Make the Road Action
- New York Communities for Change
- New York League of Conservation Voters
- Our Revolution
- Sunrise Movement NYC
- Working Families Party

=== Republican primary ===
==== Nominee ====
- Martha Rowen, third-party candidate for New York's 26th State Senate district in 2022

==== Endorsements ====
Martha Rowen

Organizations

- Conservative Party of New York

=== General election ===
==== Results ====
2023 New York City's 33rd City Council district election
Party	Candidate	Votes	%
Democratic	Lincoln Restler	8,199	65.30%
Working Families	Lincoln Restler	2,726	21.71%
Total	Lincoln Restler (incumbent)	10,925	87.02%
Republican	Martha Rowen	1,244	9.91%
Conservative	Martha Rowen	274	2.18%
Total	Martha Rowen	1,518	12.09%
Write-in		112	0.89%
Total votes		12,555	100.0%
Democratic hold			

== District 34 ==
2023 New York City's 34th City Council district election
- November 7, 2023
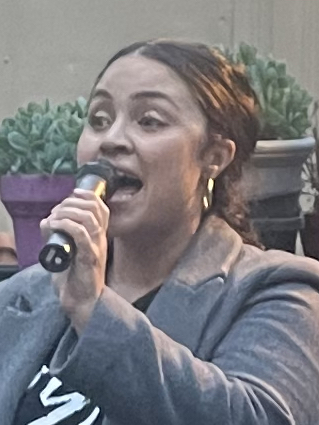

	Majority party	Minority party
Candidate	Jennifer Gutiérrez	Marguerite Chandler
Party	Democratic	Medical Freedom
Alliance	Working Families
Popular vote	7,515	373
Percentage	94.6%	4.7%
Councilmember before election
Jennifer Gutiérrez
Democratic
Elected Councilmember
Jennifer Gutiérrez
Democratic

=== Democratic primary ===
==== Nominee ====
- Jennifer Gutiérrez, incumbent councilmember

==== Eliminated in primary ====
- Paperboy Prince, activist and perennial candidate

==== Endorsements ====
Jennifer Gutiérrez

Labor unions

- Council of School Supervisors & Administrators
- District Council 37
- International Union of Painters and Allied Trades District Council 9
- New York State Nurses Association
- NYC District Council of Carpenters
- Professional Staff Congress CUNY
- United Federation of Teachers

Organizations

- Citizen Action of New York
- The Jewish Vote
- Make the Road Action
- New York Communities for Change
- New York League of Conservation Voters
- Our Revolution
- Planned Parenthood of Greater New York Action Fund
- Run for Something
- Stonewall Democratic Club of New York City
- Sunrise Movement NYC
- Working Families Party

==== Results ====
Democratic primary results
Party	Candidate	Votes	%
Democratic	Jennifer Gutiérrez (incumbent)	2,983	81.1
Democratic	Paperboy Prince	675	18.4
Write-in		18	0.5
Total votes		3,676	100.0

=== Independents and minor parties ===
==== Declared ====
- Marguerite Chandler

=== General election ===
==== Results ====
2023 New York City's 34th City Council district election
Party	Candidate	Votes	%
Democratic	Jennifer Gutiérrez	5,297	66.71%
Working Families	Jennifer Gutiérrez	2,218	27.93%
Total	Jennifer Gutiérrez (incumbent)	7,515	94.64%
Medical Freedom	Marguerite Chandler	373	4.70%
Write-in		52	0.66%
Total votes		7,940	100.0%
Democratic hold			

== District 35 ==
2023 New York City's 35th City Council district election
- November 7, 2023
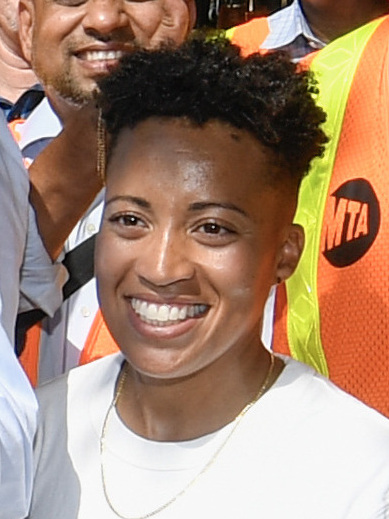
	Majority party
Candidate	Crystal Hudson
Party	Democratic
Alliance	Working Families
Popular vote	13,936
Percentage	97.4%
Councilmember before election
Crystal Hudson
Democratic
Elected Councilmember
Crystal Hudson
Democratic

=== Democratic primary ===
==== Nominee ====
- Crystal Hudson, incumbent councilmember

==== Endorsements ====
Crystal Hudson

Labor unions

- Council of School Supervisors & Administrators
- District Council 37
- Freelancers Union
- International Union of Painters and Allied Trades District Council 9
- LiUNA! New York
- New York City Central Labor Council
- New York State Nurses Association
- NYC District Council of Carpenters
- Professional Staff Congress CUNY

Organizations

- American Institute of Architects New York
- Citizen Action of New York
- EMILY's List
- The Jewish Vote
- LGBTQ Victory Fund
- Make the Road Action
- New York League of Conservation Voters
- Our Revolution
- Planned Parenthood of Greater New York Action Fund
- Run for Something
- Stonewall Democratic Club of New York City
- Working Families Party

=== Independents and minor parties ===
==== Disqualified ====
- Kevin Paul

=== General election ===
==== Results ====
2023 New York City's 35th City Council district election
Party	Candidate	Votes	%
Democratic	Crystal Hudson	10,094	70.52%
Working Families	Crystal Hudson	3,842	26.84%
Total	Crystal Hudson (incumbent)	13,936	97.37%
Write-in		377	2.63%
Total votes		14,313	100.0%
Democratic hold			

== District 36 ==
2023 New York City's 36th City Council district election
- November 7, 2023
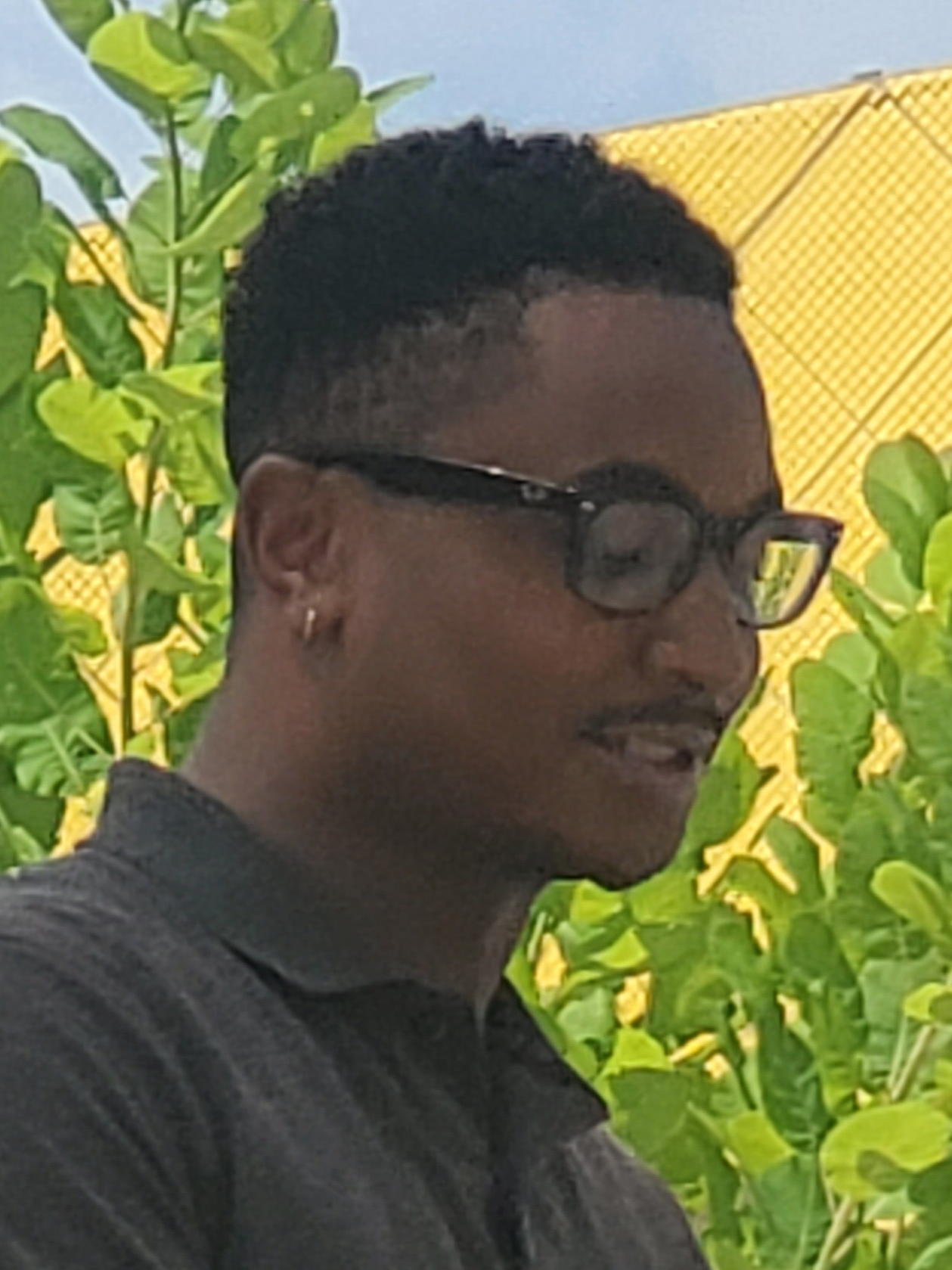
	Majority party
Candidate	Chi Ossé
Party	Democratic
Alliance	Working Families
Popular vote	9,735
Percentage	98.8%
Councilmember before election
Chi Ossé
Democratic
Elected Councilmember
Chi Ossé
Democratic

=== Democratic primary ===
==== Nominee ====
- Chi Ossé, incumbent councilmember

==== Endorsements ====
Chi Ossé

Labor unions

- Council of School Supervisors & Administrators
- District Council 37
- Freelancers Union
- New York City Central Labor Council
- New York State Nurses Association
- NYC District Council of Carpenters
- Professional Staff Congress CUNY
- United Federation of Teachers

Organizations

- Citizen Action of New York
- The Jewish Vote
- Jim Owles Liberal Democratic Club
- LGBTQ Victory Fund
- Make the Road Action
- New York League of Conservation Voters
- Our Revolution
- Run for Something
- Sunrise Movement NYC
- Working Families Party

=== General election ===
==== Results ====
2023 New York City's 36th City Council district election
Party	Candidate	Votes	%
Democratic	Chi Ossé	7,132	72.35%
Working Families	Chi Ossé	2,603	26.40%
Total	Chi Ossé (incumbent)	9,735	98.75%
Write-in		123	1.25%
Total votes		9,858	100.0%
Democratic hold			

== District 37 ==
2023 New York City's 37th City Council district election
- November 7, 2023
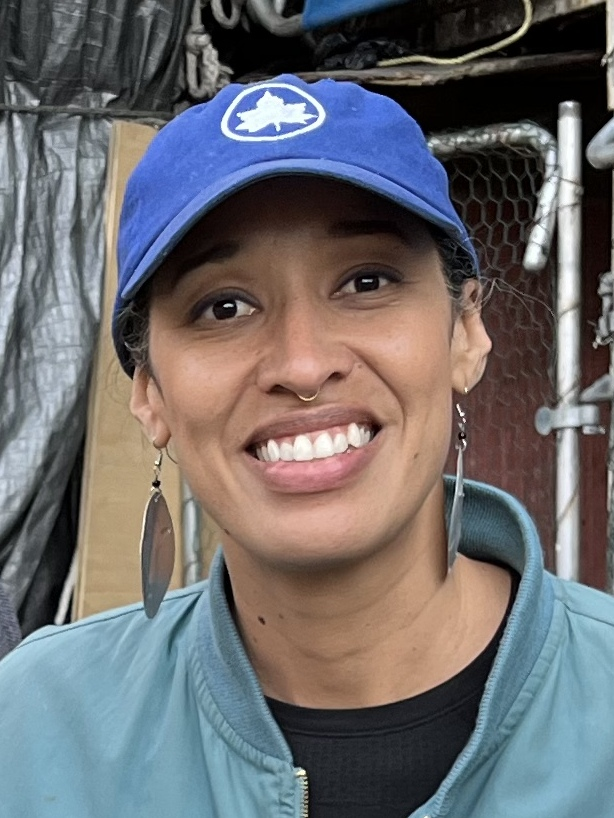

	Majority party	Minority party
Candidate	Sandy Nurse	Isaiah Vega
Party	Democratic	Republican
Alliance	Working Families	Conservative
Popular vote	4,769	554
Percentage	88.7%	10.3%
Councilmember before election
Sandy Nurse
Democratic
Elected Councilmember
Sandy Nurse
Democratic

=== Democratic primary ===
==== Nominee ====
- Sandy Nurse, incumbent councilmember

==== Disqualified ====
- Hugo Espinal, former community liaison for former state senator Martin Malave Dilan

==== Endorsements ====
Sandy Nurse

Labor unions

- Council of School Supervisors & Administrators
- District Council 37
- International Union of Painters and Allied Trades District Council 9
- LiUNA! New York
- New York City Central Labor Council
- New York State Nurses Association
- NYC District Council of Carpenters
- Professional Staff Congress CUNY
- United Federation of Teachers

Organizations

- Citizen Action of New York
- EMILY's List
- The Jewish Vote
- Jim Owles Liberal Democratic Club
- Make the Road Action
- New York Communities for Change
- New York League of Conservation Voters
- Our Revolution
- Planned Parenthood of Greater New York Action Fund
- Run for Something
- Sunrise Movement NYC
- Working Families Party

=== Republican primary ===
==== Nominee ====
- Isaiah Vega, digital media editor

==== Disqualified ====
- Mitchell Bosch, anti-vax activist and participant in the January 6 Capitol attack

==== Endorsements ====
Isaiah Vega

Organizations

- Conservative Party of New York

=== Independents and minor parties ===
==== Disqualified ====
- Michael Trofort

=== General election ===
==== Results ====
2023 New York City's 37th City Council district election
Party	Candidate	Votes	%
Democratic	Sandy Nurse	3,765	70.01%
Working Families	Sandy Nurse	1,004	18.67%
Total	Sandy Nurse (incumbent)	4,769	88.68%
Republican	Isaiah Vega	461	8.57%
Conservative	Isaiah Vega	93	1.73%
Total	Isaiah Vega	554	10.30%
Write-in		55	1.02%
Total votes		5,378	100.0%
Democratic hold			

== District 38 ==
2023 New York City's 38th City Council district election
- November 7, 2023
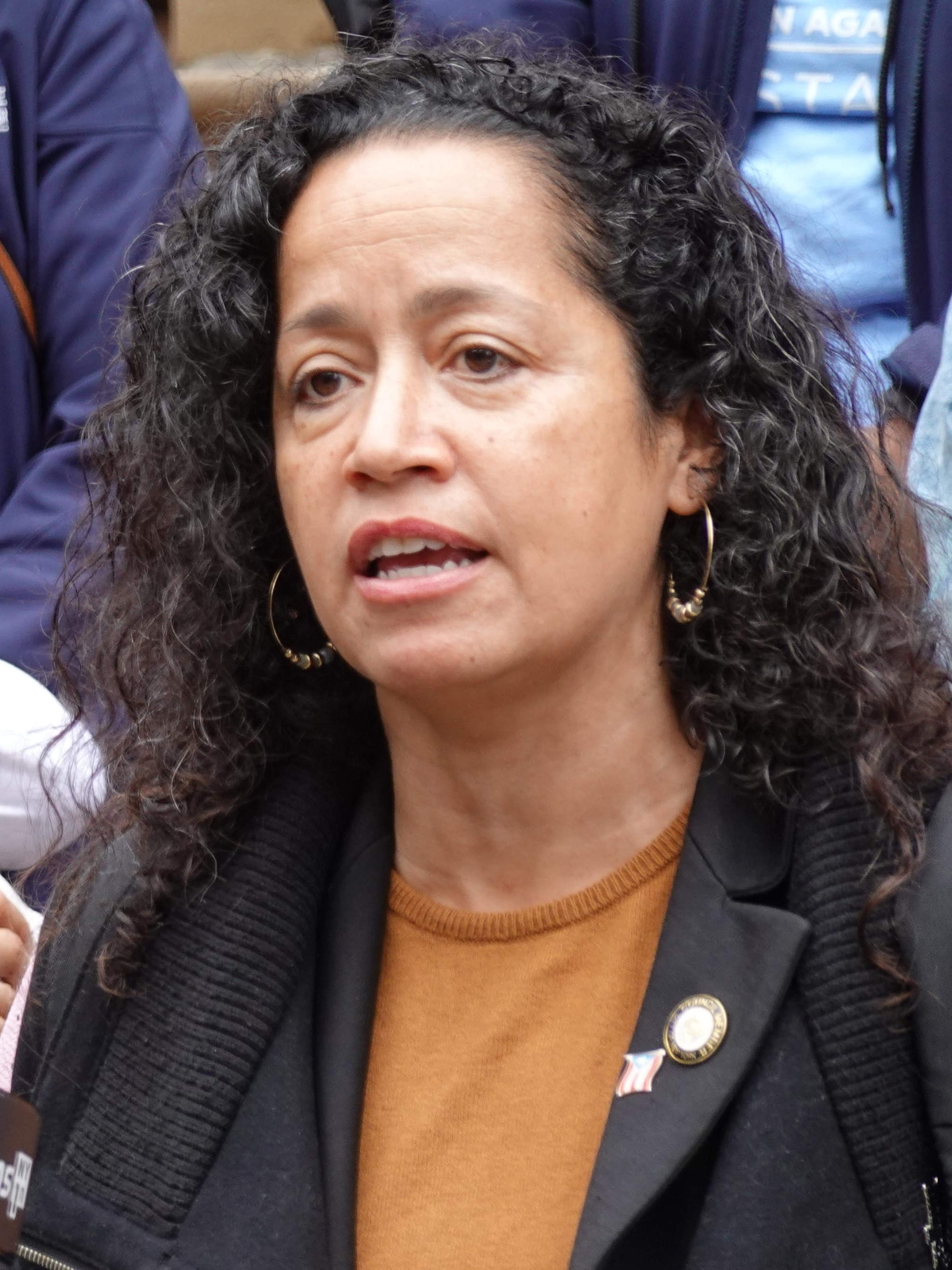

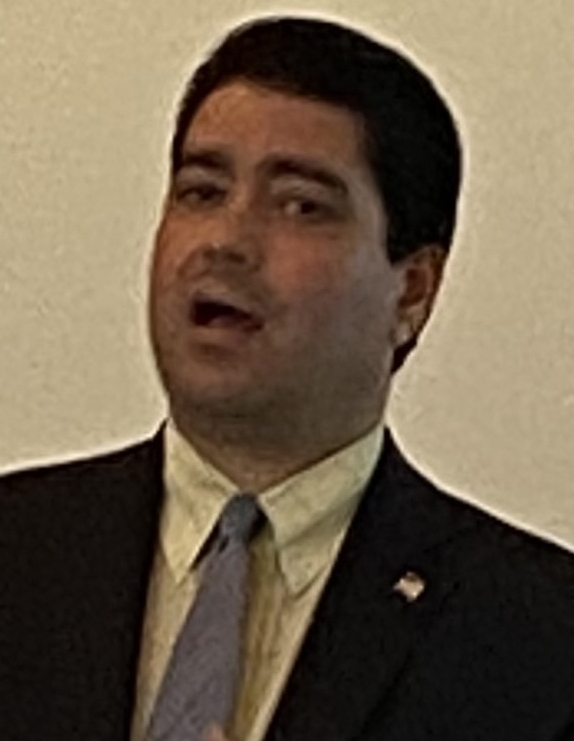
	Majority party	Minority party
Candidate	Alexa Avilés	Paul Rodriguez
Party	Democratic	Republican
Alliance	Working Families	Conservative
Popular vote	5,911	2,939
Percentage	66.3%	32.9%
Councilmember before election
Alexa Avilés
Democratic
Elected Councilmember
Alexa Avilés
Democratic

=== Democratic primary ===
==== Nominee ====
- Alexa Avilés, incumbent councilmember

==== Endorsements ====
Alexa Avilés

Labor unions

- Council of School Supervisors & Administrators
- LiUNA! New York
- International Union of Painters and Allied Trades District Council 9
- New York City Central Labor Council
- New York State Nurses Association
- NYC District Council of Carpenters
- Professional Staff Congress CUNY

Organizations

- Citizen Action of New York
- Emgage PAC
- The Jewish Vote
- Make the Road Action
- New York City Democratic Socialists of America
- New York Communities for Change
- New York League of Conservation Voters
- Our Revolution
- Planned Parenthood of Greater New York Action Fund
- Sunrise Movement NYC
- Working Families Party

=== Republican primary ===
==== Nominee ====
- Paul Rodriguez, nominee for New York State Comptroller in 2022, Conservative Party nominee for New York City Comptroller in 2021

==== Endorsements ====
Paul Rodriguez

Organizations

- Conservative Party of New York

=== Independents and minor parties ===
==== Disqualified ====
- Erik Frankel, Democratic candidate for New York's 51st State Assembly district in 2022 and Conservative Party nominee for this seat in 2021
- Seth Galinsky
- Christopher Skelly, secretary of the Brooklyn Libertarian Party

=== General election ===
==== Results ====
2023 New York City's 38th City Council district election
Party	Candidate	Votes	%
Democratic	Alexa Avilés	4,363	48.92%
Working Families	Alexa Avilés	1,548	17.36%
Total	Alexa Avilés (incumbent)	5,911	66.27%
Republican	Paul Rodriguez	2,558	28.68%
Conservative	Paul Rodriguez	381	4.27%
Total	Paul Rodriguez	2,939	32.95%
Write-in		69	0.77%
Total votes		8,919	100.0%
Democratic hold			

== District 39 ==
2023 New York City's 39th City Council district election
- November 7, 2023
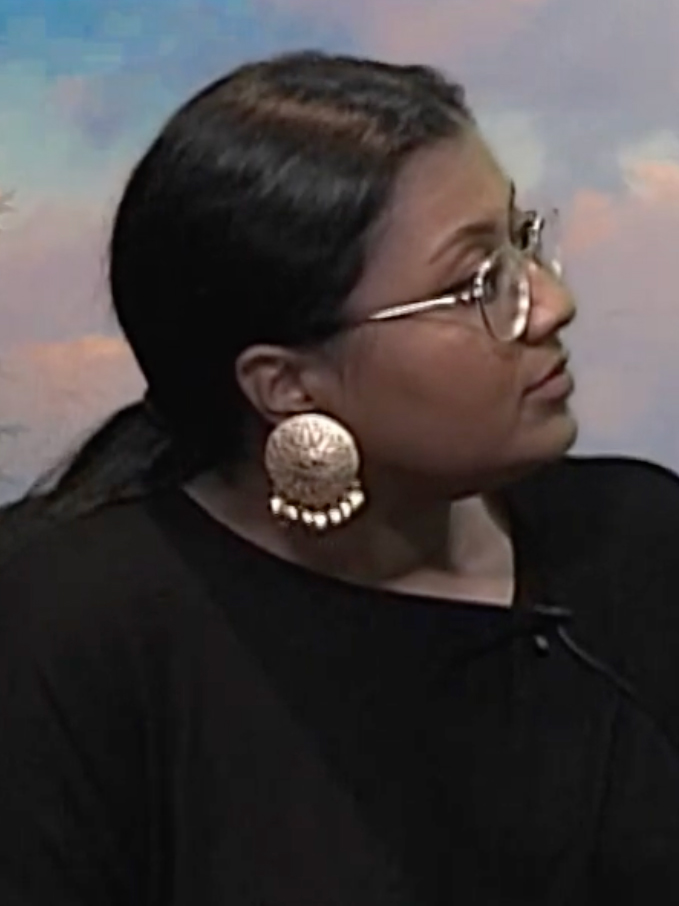

	Majority party	Minority party
Candidate	Shahana Hanif	Arek Tomaszewski
Party	Democratic	Republican
Alliance	Working Families	Conservative
Popular vote	17,900	2,667
Percentage	85.3%	12.7%
Councilmember before election
Shahana Hanif
Democratic
Elected Councilmember
Shahana Hanif
Democratic

=== Democratic primary ===
==== Nominee ====
- Shahana Hanif, incumbent councilmember

==== Disqualified ====
- Nickie Kane, paralegal studies student at New York City College of Technology

==== Endorsements ====
Shahana Hanif

Labor unions

- Council of School Supervisors & Administrators
- Freelancers Union
- International Union of Painters and Allied Trades District Council 9
- New York State Nurses Association
- NYC District Council of Carpenters
- Professional Staff Congress CUNY
- United Federation of Teachers

Organizations

- Citizen Action of New York
- Emgage PAC
- The Jewish Vote
- Make the Road Action
- New York Communities for Change
- New York League of Conservation Voters
- Our Revolution
- Planned Parenthood of Greater New York Action Fund
- Run for Something
- Sunrise Movement NYC
- Working Families Party

=== Republican primary ===
==== Nominee ====
- Arek Tomaszewski, anti-vax activist

==== Endorsements ====
Arek Tomaszewski

Organizations

- Conservative Party of New York

=== General election ===
==== Results ====
2023 New York City's 39th City Council district election
Party	Candidate	Votes	%
Democratic	Shahana Hanif	12,108	57.70%
Working Families	Shahana Hanif	5,792	27.60%
Total	Shahana Hanif (incumbent)	17,900	85.30%
Republican	Arek Tomaszewski	2,173	10.36%
Conservative	Arek Tomaszewski	494	2.35%
Total	Arek Tomaszewski	2,667	12.71%
Write-in		417	1.99%
Total votes		20,984	100.0%
Democratic hold			

== District 40 ==
2023 New York City's 40th City Council district election
- November 7, 2023
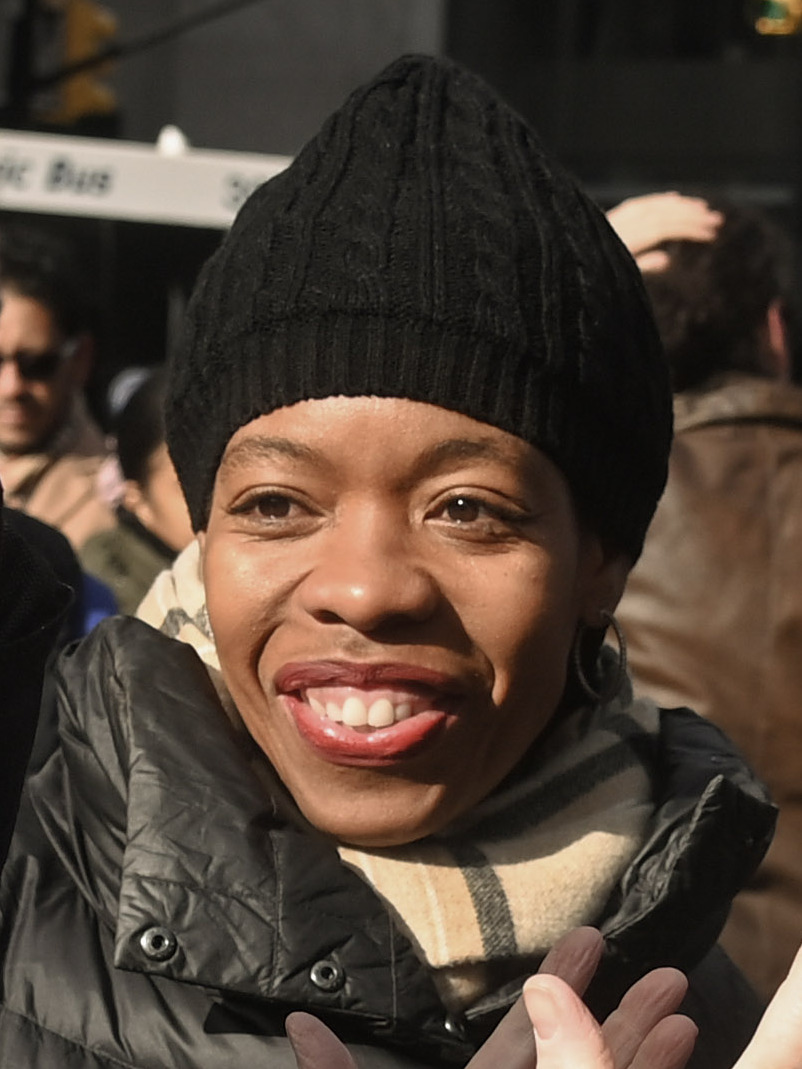

	Majority party	Minority party
Candidate	Rita Joseph	Daniel Lally
Party	Democratic	Medical Freedom
Alliance	Working Families
Popular vote	11,155	327
Percentage	96.2%	2.9%
Councilmember before election
Rita Joseph
Democratic
Elected Councilmember
Rita Joseph
Democratic

=== Democratic primary ===
==== Nominee ====
- Rita Joseph, incumbent councilmember

==== Endorsements ====
Rita Joseph

Labor unions

- Council of School Supervisors & Administrators
- District Council 37
- Freelancers Union
- LiUNA! New York
- New York State Nurses Association
- NYC District Council of Carpenters

Organizations

- American Institute of Architects New York
- Citizen Action of New York
- Emgage PAC
- The Jewish Vote
- Jim Owles Liberal Democratic Club
- Make the Road Action
- New York Communities for Change
- New York League of Conservation Voters
- Our Revolution
- Working Families Party

=== Independents and minor parties ===
==== Declared ====
- Daniel Lally

=== General election ===
==== Results ====
2023 New York City's 40th City Council district election
Party	Candidate	Votes	%
Democratic	Rita Joseph	8,534	73.59%
Working Families	Rita Joseph	2,621	22.60%
Total	Rita Joseph (incumbent)	11,155	96.20%
Medical Freedom	Daniel Lally	327	2.93%
Write-in		114	0.98%
Total votes		11,596	100.0%
Democratic hold			

== District 41 ==
2023 New York City's 41st City Council district election
- November 7, 2023
	Majority party
Candidate	Darlene Mealy
Party	Democratic
Popular vote	6,134
Percentage	97.5%
Councilmember before election
Darlene Mealy
Democratic
Elected Councilmember
Darlene Mealy
Democratic

=== Democratic primary ===
==== Nominee ====
- Darlene Mealy, incumbent councilmember

==== Eliminated in primary ====
- Reginald Bowman, senior member of the Citywide Council of NYCHA Presidents
- Isis McIntosh Green, deputy co-executive director for the New York State Independent Redistricting Commission and former chief of staff for Latrice Walker
- Joyce Shearin, candidate for this seat in 2017

==== Endorsements ====
Darlene Mealy

Labor unions

- United Federation of Teachers
Isis McIntosh Green

State legislators

- Latrice Walker, New York State Assemblymember from the 55th district (2015–present)

Labor unions

- Communications Workers of America, District 1
- District Council 37
- International Union of Painters and Allied Trades District Council 9
- New York State Nurses Association
- NYC District Council of Carpenters
- Retail, Wholesale and Department Store Union

Organizations

- New York Communities for Change
- Working Families Party
Declined to endorse

Labor unions

- Transport Workers Union Local 100

==== Results ====
Democratic primary results
Party	Candidate	Votes	%
Democratic	Darlene Mealy (incumbent)	2,752	61.2
Democratic	Isis McIntosh Green	1,333	29.6
Democratic	Reginald Bowman	231	5.1
Democratic	Joyce Shearin	159	3.5
Write-in		21	0.5
Total votes		4,496	100.0

=== Independents and minor parties ===
==== Disqualified ====
- Jarod Leonard

=== General election ===
==== Results ====
2023 New York City's 41st City Council district election
Party	Candidate	Votes	%
Democratic	Darlene Mealy (incumbent)	6,134	97.54%
Write-in		155	2.46%
Total votes		6,289	100.0%
Democratic hold			

== District 42 ==
2023 New York City's 42nd City Council district election
- November 7, 2023
	Majority party
Candidate	Chris Banks
Party	Democratic
Popular vote	6,753
Percentage	97.3%
Councilmember before election
Charles Barron
Democratic
Elected Councilmember
Chris Banks
Democratic

=== Democratic primary ===
==== Nominee ====
- Chris Banks, candidate for this seat in 2013 and candidate for New York's 60th State Assembly district in 2012 and 2014

==== Eliminated in primary ====
- Charles Barron, incumbent councilmember
- Jamilah Rose, grant writer

==== Endorsements ====
Chris Banks

Local officials

- Eric Adams, mayor of New York City (2022–present), former Brooklyn borough president (2014–2021), and former New York state senator from the 20th district (2007–2013)

Labor unions

- District Council 37
- International Union of Painters and Allied Trades District Council 9
- NYC District Council of Carpenters
- United Federation of Teachers
Charles Barron

Labor unions

- Council of School Supervisors & Administrators
- Professional Staff Congress CUNY

Organizations

- New York Communities for Change

==== Debate ====
2023 New York's 42nd City Council district Democratic primary debate
No.	Date	Host	Moderator	Link	Democratic	Democratic	Democratic
Key: P Participant A Absent N Not invited I Invited W Withdrawn							
Key: P Participant A Absent N Not invited I Invited W Withdrawn					Chris Banks	Charles Barron	Jamilah Rose
1	Jun. 13, 2023	Schneps Media	Isabel Song Beer	YouTube	P	P	A

==== Results ====
Democratic primary results
Party	Candidate	Votes	%
Democratic	Chris Banks	3,099	50.8
Democratic	Charles Barron (incumbent)	2,602	42.6
Democratic	Jamilah Rose	346	5.7
Write-in		54	0.9
Total votes		6,101	100.0

=== Independents and minor parties ===
==== Disqualified ====
- Richard Simmons

=== General election ===
==== Results ====
2023 New York City's 42nd City Council district election
Party	Candidate	Votes	%
Democratic	Chris Banks	6,753	97.33%
Write-in		185	2.67%
Total votes		6,938	100.0%
Democratic hold			

== District 43 ==
2023 New York City's 43rd City Council district election
- November 7, 2023
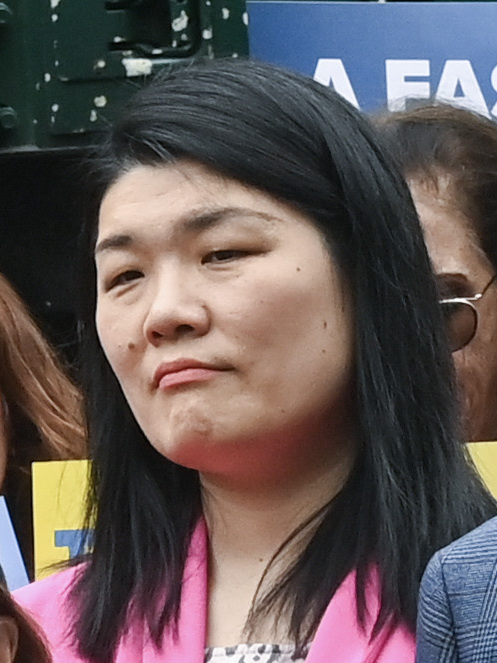

	Majority party	Minority party	Third party
Candidate	Susan Zhuang	Ying Tan	Vito LaBella
Party	Democratic	Republican	Conservative
Popular vote	4,898	2,188	1,215
Percentage	58.7%	26.2%	14.5%
Councilmember before election
None
(Redistricting)
Elected Councilmember
Susan Zhuang
Democratic

=== Democratic primary ===
==== Nominee ====
- Susan Zhuang, Chief of Staff to Assemblymember William Colton

==== Eliminated in primary ====
- Wai Yee Chan, executive director of Homecrest Community Services
- Stanley Ng, computer programmer, former member of the Community Education Council from the 20th district

==== Declined ====
- Jimmy Li, podiatrist, former member of Brooklyn Community Board 7, former president of the New York City Asian-American Democratic Club, and candidate for New York's 10th congressional district in 2022

==== Endorsements ====
Wai Yee Chan

State legislators

- Peter Abbate, former New York State Assemblymember from the 49th district (1987–2022)
- Iwen Chu, New York state senator from the 17th district (2023–2024)
- Andrew Gounardes, New York state senator from the 22nd district (2019–present)

Local officials

- Justin Brannan, New York City Councilmember from the 43rd district (2018–present)

Labor unions

- Professional Staff Congress CUNY
- United Federation of Teachers

Organizations

- Citizens Union (third choice)
Stanley Ng

Local officials

- Margaret Chin, former New York City Councilmember from the 1st district (2010–2021)

Organizations

- Asian Wave Alliance (second choice)
- Citizens Union (second choice)
Susan Zhuang

State legislators

- William Colton, New York State Assemblymember from the 47th district (1997–present)

Local officials

- ~~Ari Kagan, New York City Councilmember from the 47th district (2022–present) (Republican)~~ (Note: Withdrew endorsement after switching parties)
- Mark Treyger, Executive Director of Intergovernmental Affairs at the New York City Department of Education (2022–present), former New York City Councilmember from the 47th district (2014–2021)

Organizations

- Citizens Union (first choice)
- EMILY's List
Declined to endorse

Labor unions

- District Council 37

==== Debate ====
2023 New York's 43rd City Council district Democratic primary debate
No.	Date	Host	Moderator	Link	Democratic	Democratic	Democratic
Key: P Participant A Absent N Not invited I Invited W Withdrawn							
Key: P Participant A Absent N Not invited I Invited W Withdrawn					Wai Yee Chan	Stanley Ng	Susan Zhuang
1	Jun. 9, 2023	Schneps Media	Aidan Graham	YouTube	P	P	P

==== Results ====
Democratic primary results
Party	Candidate	Votes	%
Democratic	Susan Zhuang	2,126	58.5
Democratic	Wai Yee Chan	1,127	31.0
Democratic	Stanley Ng	347	9.6
Write-in		32	0.9
Total votes		3,632	100.0

=== Republican primary ===
==== Nominee ====
- Ying Tan, community activist

==== Eliminated in primary ====
- Vito LaBella, former NYPD officer and nominee for New York's 17th State Senate district in 2022

==== Withdrawn ====
- Jack Ho, community liaison director for New York State Assemblymember Lester Chang

==== Endorsements ====
Vito LaBella

Individuals

- Curtis Sliwa, founder of the Guardian Angels, radio talk show host, and Republican nominee for mayor of New York City in 2021

Organizations

- Brooklyn Republican Party
- Conservative Party of New York
Ying Tan

Organizations

- Asian Wave Alliance (first choice)
- New York Young Republican Club

==== Results ====
Republican primary results
Party	Candidate	Votes	%
Republican	Ying Tan	425	50.7
Republican	Vito LaBella	394	47.0
Write-in		19	2.3
Total votes		838	100.0

=== Conservative primary ===
==== Nominee ====
- Vito LaBella, former NYPD officer and nominee for New York's 17th State Senate district in 2022

=== General election ===
==== Results ====
2023 New York City's 43rd City Council district election
Party	Candidate	Votes	%
Democratic	Susan Zhuang	4,898	58.65%
Republican	Ying Tan	2,188	26.20%
Conservative	Vito LaBella	1,215	14.55%
Write-in		50	0.60%
Total votes		8,351	100.0%
Democratic win (new seat)			

== District 44 ==
2023 New York City's 44th City Council district election
- November 7, 2023
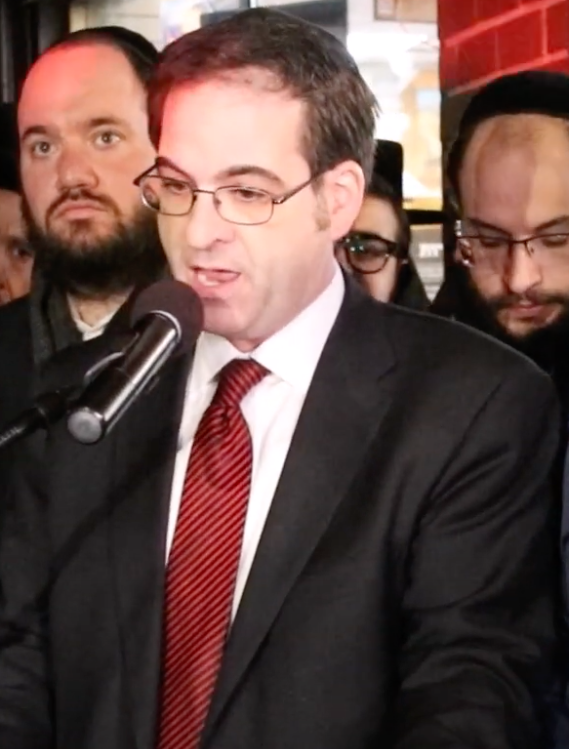

	Majority party	Minority party
Candidate	Kalman Yeger	Heshy Tischler
Party	Democratic	Boro Park Flatbush
Alliance	Republican; Conservative
Popular vote	7,500	1,732
Percentage	80.0%	18.5%
Councilmember before election
Kalman Yeger
Democratic
Elected Councilmember
Kalman Yeger
Democratic

=== Democratic primary ===
==== Nominee ====
- Kalman Yeger, incumbent councilmember

==== Endorsements ====
Kalman Yeger

Labor unions

- Council of School Supervisors & Administrators
- United Federation of Teachers

Organizations

- Conservative Party of New York

=== Republican primary ===
==== Nominee ====
- Kalman Yeger, incumbent councilmember

==== Eliminated in primary ====
- Heshy Tischler, radio show host, community activist, candidate for the 48th district in 2021, and 2017

==== Endorsements ====
Kalman Yeger

Labor unions

- Council of School Supervisors & Administrators
- United Federation of Teachers

Organizations

- Conservative Party of New York

==== Results ====
Republican primary results
Party	Candidate	Votes	%
Republican	Kalman Yeger (incumbent)	395	51.2
Republican	Heshy Tischler	365	47.3
Write-in		12	1.6
Total votes		772	100.0

=== Independents and minor parties ===
==== Declared ====
- Heshy Tischler, radio show host, community activist and candidate for the 48th district in 2021 and 2017 (lost Republican primary)

=== General election ===
==== Results ====
2023 New York City's 44th City Council district election
Party	Candidate	Votes	%
Republican	Kalman Yeger	3,936	41.96%
Democratic	Kalman Yeger	2,779	29.63%
Conservative	Kalman Yeger	785	8.37%
Total	Kalman Yeger (incumbent)	7,500	79.96%
Boro Park Flatbush	Heshy Tischler	1,732	18.46%
Write-in		148	1.58%
Total votes		9,196	100.0%
Democratic hold			

== District 45 ==
2023 New York City's 45th City Council district election
- November 7, 2023
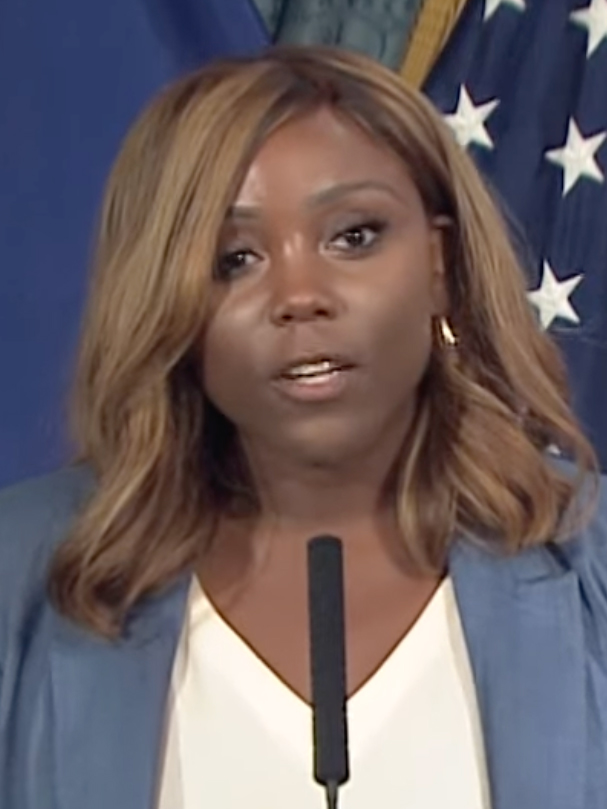
	Majority party
Candidate	Farah Louis
Party	Democratic
Popular vote	8,750
Percentage	96.7%
Councilmember before election
Farah Louis
Democratic
Elected Councilmember
Farah Louis
Democratic

=== Democratic primary ===
==== Nominee ====
- Farah Louis, incumbent councilmember

==== Endorsements ====
Farah Louis

Labor unions

- Council of School Supervisors & Administrators
- District Council 37
- Freelancers Union
- LiUNA! New York
- New York City Central Labor Council
- United Federation of Teachers

Organizations

- New York League of Conservation Voters
- Planned Parenthood of Greater New York Action Fund

=== General election ===
==== Results ====
2023 New York City's 45th City Council district election
Party	Candidate	Votes	%
Democratic	Farah Louis (incumbent)	8,750	96.71%
Write-in		298	3.29%
Total votes		9,048	100.0%
Democratic hold			

== District 46 ==
2023 New York City's 46th City Council district election
- November 7, 2023
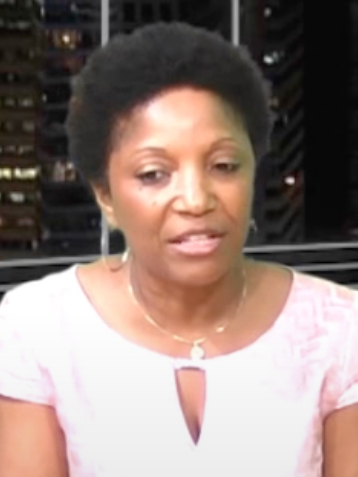

	Majority party	Minority party
Candidate	Mercedes Narcisse	Michael Moran
Party	Democratic	Republican
Alliance		Conservative
Popular vote	7,428	3,659
Percentage	65.3%	32.2%
Councilmember before election
Mercedes Narcisse
Democratic
Elected Councilmember
Mercedes Narcisse
Democratic

=== Democratic primary ===
==== Nominee ====
- Mercedes Narcisse, incumbent councilmember

==== Endorsements ====
Mercedes Narcisse

Labor unions

- Council of School Supervisors & Administrators
- District Council 37
- Freelancers Union
- International Union of Painters and Allied Trades District Council 9
- New York City Central Labor Council
- New York State Nurses Association
- NYC District Council of Carpenters
- United Federation of Teachers

Organizations

- Citizen Action of New York
- New York League of Conservation Voters

=== Republican primary ===
==== Nominee ====
- Michael Moran

==== Endorsements ====
Michael Moran

Organizations

- Conservative Party of New York

=== Independents and minor parties ===
==== Declared ====
- Adlerette Kebreau, pastor

==== Disqualified ====
- Wayne Chang

=== General election ===
==== Results ====
2023 New York City's 46th City Council district election
Party	Candidate	Votes	%
Democratic	Mercedes Narcisse (incumbent)	7,428	65.27%
Republican	Michael Moran	3,088	27.13%
Conservative	Michael Moran	571	5.02%
Total	Michael Moran	3,659	32.15%
Kebreau 4 Council	Adlerette Kebreau	221	1.94%
Write-in		73	0.64%
Total votes		11,150	100.0%
Democratic hold			

== District 47 ==
2023 New York City's 47th City Council district election
- November 7, 2023
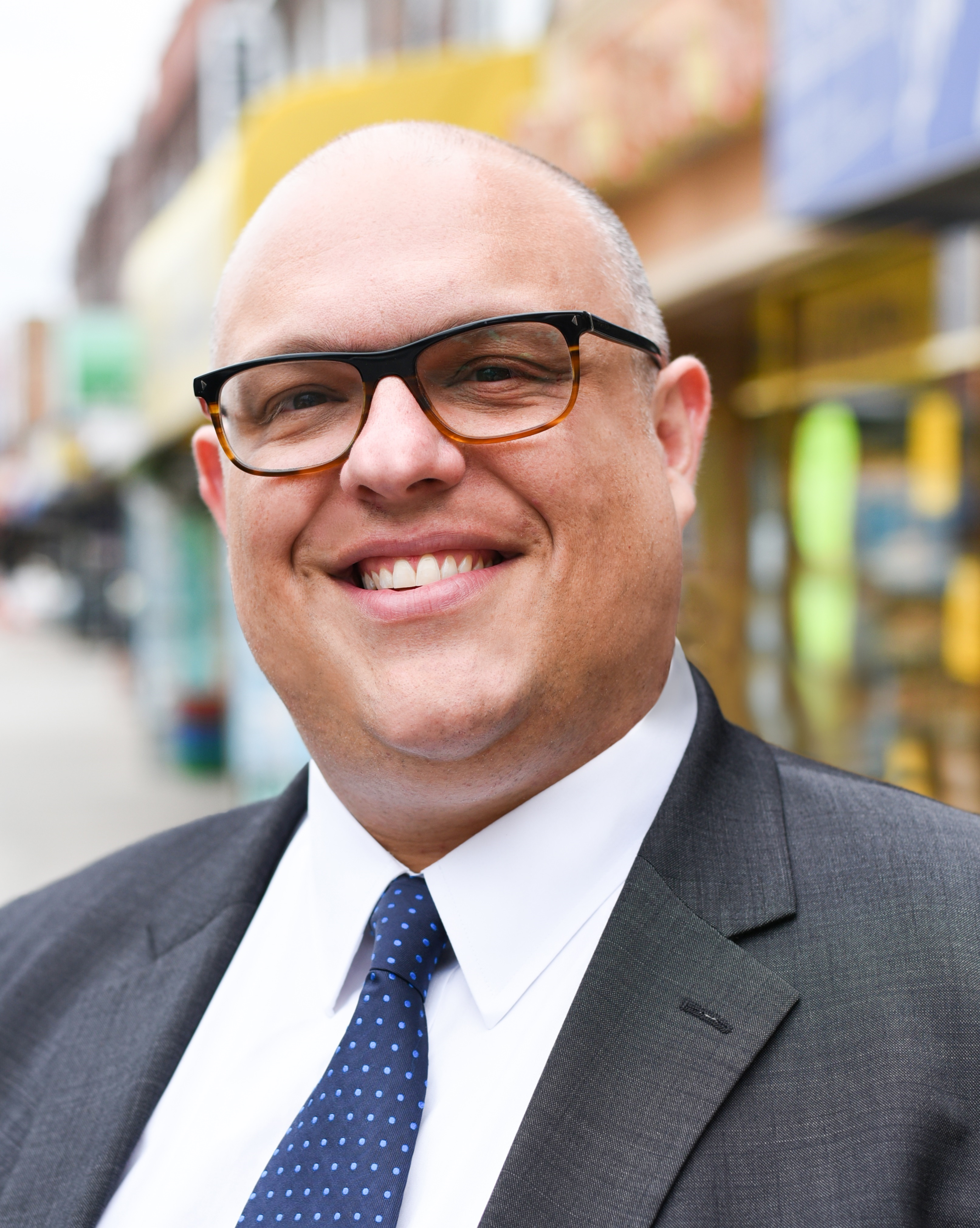

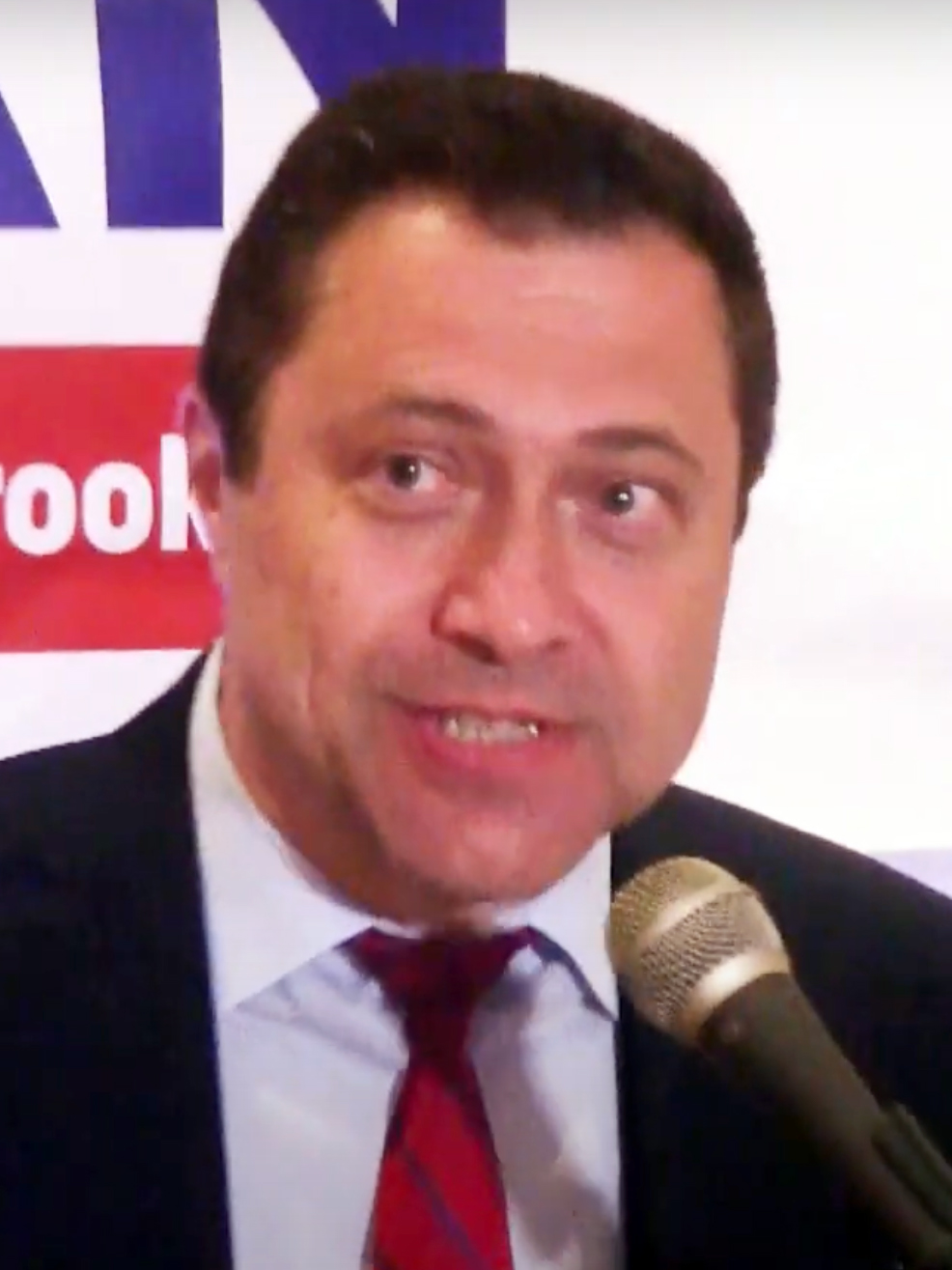
	Majority party	Minority party
Candidate	Justin Brannan	Ari Kagan
Party	Democratic	Republican
Alliance		Conservative
Popular vote	11,517	8,233
Percentage	58.0%	41.5%
Councilmember before election
Ari Kagan (Republican)
Justin Brannan (Democratic)
Elected Councilmember
Justin Brannan
Democratic

=== Republican primary ===
==== Nominee ====
- Ari Kagan, incumbent councilmember (switched parties on December 5, 2022)

==== Eliminated in primary ====
- Anna Belfore-Delfaus, former public school teacher
- Avery Pereira, candidate for New York's 7th congressional district in 2020

==== Withdrawn ====
- Michael Ragusa, candidate for New York's 10th congressional district in 2022

==== Endorsements ====
Anna Belfore-Delfaus

U.S. representatives

- Peter King, former U.S. representative from New York's 2nd congressional district (2013–2021), former U.S. representative from New York's 3rd congressional district (1993–2013), and former comptroller of Nassau County (1982–1993)

Local officials

- Inna Vernikov, Minority Whip of the New York City Council (2022–present) and New York City Councilmember from the 48th district (2021–present)

Individuals

- Alison Esposito, former NYPD Deputy Inspector and nominee for lieutenant governor of New York in 2022

Organizations

- Asian Wave Alliance (second choice)
Ari Kagan

U.S. representatives

- Nicole Malliotakis, U.S. representative from New York's 11th congressional district (2021–present), former New York State Assemblymember from the 64th district (2013–2020), former New York State Assemblymember from the 60th district (2011–2012), and nominee for Mayor of New York City in 2017

State legislators

- Marty Golden, former New York state senator from the 22nd district (2003–2018) and former New York City Councilmember from the 43rd district (1998–2002)

Labor unions

- Captains Endowment Association
- Detectives' Endowment Association
- Lieutenants Benevolent Association
- Sergeants Benevolent Association

Organizations

- Asian Wave Alliance (first choice)
Michael Ragusa (withdrawn)

Local officials

- Rudy Giuliani, former mayor of New York City (1993–2001)
Declined to endorse

State legislators

- Alec Brook-Krasny, New York State Assemblymember from the 46th district (2006–2015, 2023–present)

Organizations

- Brooklyn Republican Party

==== Results ====
Republican primary results
Party	Candidate	Votes	%
Republican	Ari Kagan (incumbent)	1,634	75.3
Republican	Anna Belfore-Delfaus	271	12.5
Republican	Avery Pereira	255	11.8
Write-in		10	0.5
Total votes		2,170	100.0

=== Democratic primary ===
==== Nominee ====
- Justin Brannan, incumbent councilmember from the 43rd district

==== Withdrawn ====
- Anthony Batista Perez, former staffer for former New York State Assemblymember Mathylde Frontus

==== Endorsements ====
Justin Brannan

U.S. senators

- Bernie Sanders, U.S. senator from Vermont (2007–present)

U.S. representatives

- Hakeem Jeffries, House Minority Leader (2023–present), chair of the House Democratic Caucus (2023–present), U.S. representative from New York's 8th congressional district (2013–present), and former New York State Assemblymember from the 57th district (2007–2012)

Labor unions

- Communications Workers of America, District 1
- Council of School Supervisors & Administrators
- District Council 37
- Hotel Trades Council
- International Union of Painters and Allied Trades District Council 9
- New York City Central Labor Council
- New York City Coalition of the International Union of Operating Engineers
- New York State Nurses Association
- NYC District Council of Carpenters
- SEIU 32BJ
- Transport Workers Union Local 100

Organizations

- American Institute of Architects New York
- New York League of Conservation Voters
- Planned Parenthood of Greater New York Action Fund
- Stonewall Democratic Club of New York City

=== Conservative primary ===
==== Nominee ====
- Ari Kagan, incumbent councilmember

==== Withdrawn ====
- Timothy Peterson

=== General election ===
==== Results ====
2023 New York City's 47th City Council district election
Party	Candidate	Votes	%
Democratic	Justin Brannan (incumbent)	11,517	58.01%
Republican	Ari Kagan	7,216	36.35%
Conservative	Ari Kagan	1,017	5.12%
Total	Ari Kagan (incumbent)	8,233	41.47%
Write-in		103	0.52%
Total votes		19,164	100.0%
Democratic hold			

== District 48 ==
2023 New York City's 48th City Council district election
- November 7, 2023
	Majority party	Minority party	Third party
Candidate	Inna Vernikov	Amber Adler	Igor Kazatsker
Party	Republican	Democratic	Team Trump
Alliance	Conservative
Popular vote	8,236	3,029	1,002
Percentage	66.8%	24.6%	8.1%
Councilmember before election
Inna Vernikov
Republican
Elected Councilmember
Inna Vernikov
Republican

=== Republican primary ===
==== Nominee ====
- Inna Vernikov, incumbent councilmember

==== Eliminated in primary ====
- Igor Kazatsker, radio executive

==== Endorsements ====
Igor Kazatsker

Local officials

- Ari Kagan, New York City Councilmember from the 47th district (2021–present)
Inna Vernikov

U.S. representatives

- Lee Zeldin, former U.S. representative from New York's 1st congressional district (2015–2023), former New York state senator from the 3rd district (2011–2014), and nominee for governor of New York in 2022

Labor unions

- Captains Endowment Association
- Detectives' Endowment Association
- Lieutenants Benevolent Association
- Sergeants Benevolent Association

Organizations

- Conservative Party of New York

==== Results ====
Republican primary results
Party	Candidate	Votes	%
Republican	Inna Vernikov (incumbent)	1,730	70.6
Republican	Igor Kazatsker	707	28.8
Write-in		15	0.6
Total votes		2,452	100.0

=== Democratic primary ===
==== Nominee ====
- Amber Adler, nonprofit executive and candidate for this seat in 2021

==== Endorsements ====
Amber Adler

Labor unions

- United Federation of Teachers

Organizations

- Planned Parenthood of Greater New York Action Fund
- Run for Something

=== Independents and minor parties ===
==== Declared ====
- Igor Kazatsker, radio executive (lost Republican primary)

==== Disqualified ====
- Roger Calero
- Guy Fox

=== General election ===
==== Results ====
2023 New York City's 48th City Council district election
Party	Candidate	Votes	%
Republican	Inna Vernikov	7,416	60.13%
Conservative	Inna Vernikov	820	6.65%
Total	Inna Vernikov (incumbent)	8,236	67.78%
Democratic	Amber Adler	2,906	23.56%
We The People	Amber Adler	123	1.00%
Total	Amber Adler	3,029	24.56%
Team Trump	Igor Kazatsker	1,002	8.12%
Write-in		67	0.54%
Total votes		12,334	100.0%
Republican hold			

== District 49 ==
2023 New York City's 49th City Council district election
- November 7, 2023
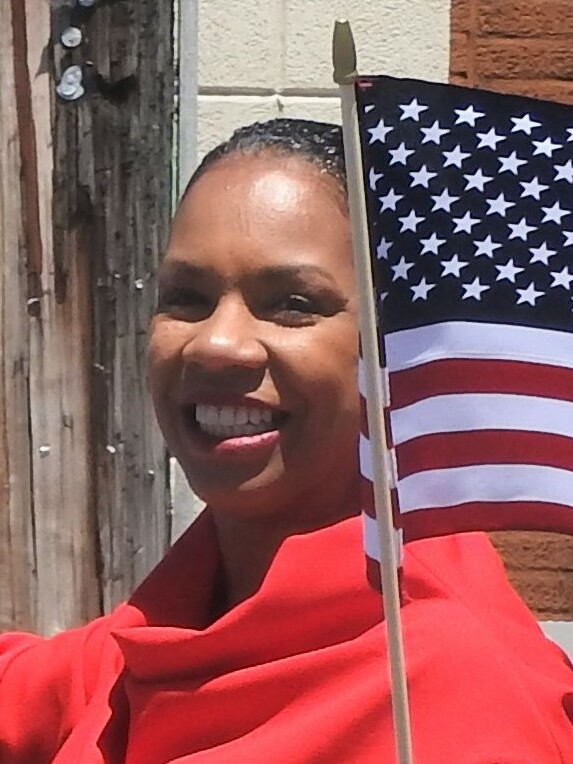

	Majority party	Minority party
Candidate	Kamillah Hanks	Ruslan Shamal
Party	Democratic	Safe Streets SI
Popular vote	6,859	1,418
Percentage	79.2%	16.4%
Councilmember before election
Kamillah Hanks
Democratic
Elected Councilmember
Kamillah Hanks
Democratic

=== Democratic primary ===
==== Nominee ====
- Kamillah Hanks, incumbent councilmember

==== Withdrawn ====
- Amoy Barnes, candidate for this seat in 2021

==== Endorsements ====
Kamillah Hanks

Labor unions

- Captains Endowment Association
- Council of School Supervisors & Administrators
- Detectives' Endowment Association
- Lieutenants Benevolent Association
- LiUNA! New York
- New York City Coalition of the International Union of Operating Engineers
- NYC District Council of Carpenters
- Sergeants Benevolent Association
- United Federation of Teachers

Organizations

- New York League of Conservation Voters

=== Independents and minor parties ===
==== Declared ====
- Ruslan Shamal, radio show host

==== Disqualified ====
- Anika Idoko

=== General election ===
==== Results ====
2023 New York City's 49th City Council district election
Party	Candidate	Votes	%
Democratic	Kamillah Hanks (incumbent)	6,859	79.23%
Safe Streets SI	Ruslan Shamal	1,418	16.38%
Write-in		380	4.39%
Total votes		8,657	100.0%
Democratic hold			

== District 50 ==
2023 New York City's 50th City Council district election
- November 7, 2023
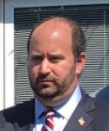
	Majority party
Candidate	David Carr
Party	Republican
Alliance	Conservative
Popular vote	9,718
Percentage	95.3%
Councilmember before election
David Carr
Republican
Elected Councilmember
David Carr
Republican

=== Republican primary ===
==== Nominee ====
- David Carr, incumbent councilmember

==== Endorsements ====
David Carr

Labor unions

- Captains Endowment Association
- Detectives' Endowment Association
- Lieutenants Benevolent Association
- New York City Coalition of the International Union of Operating Engineers
- NYC District Council of Carpenters
- Sergeants Benevolent Association

Organizations

- Conservative Party of New York

=== General election ===
==== Results ====
2023 New York City's 50th City Council district election
Party	Candidate	Votes	%
Republican	David Carr	8,092	79.32%
Conservative	David Carr	1,626	15.94%
Total	David Carr (incumbent)	9,718	95.26%
Write-in		484	4.74%
Total votes		10,202	100.0%
Republican hold			

== District 51 ==
2023 New York City's 51st City Council district election
- November 7, 2023
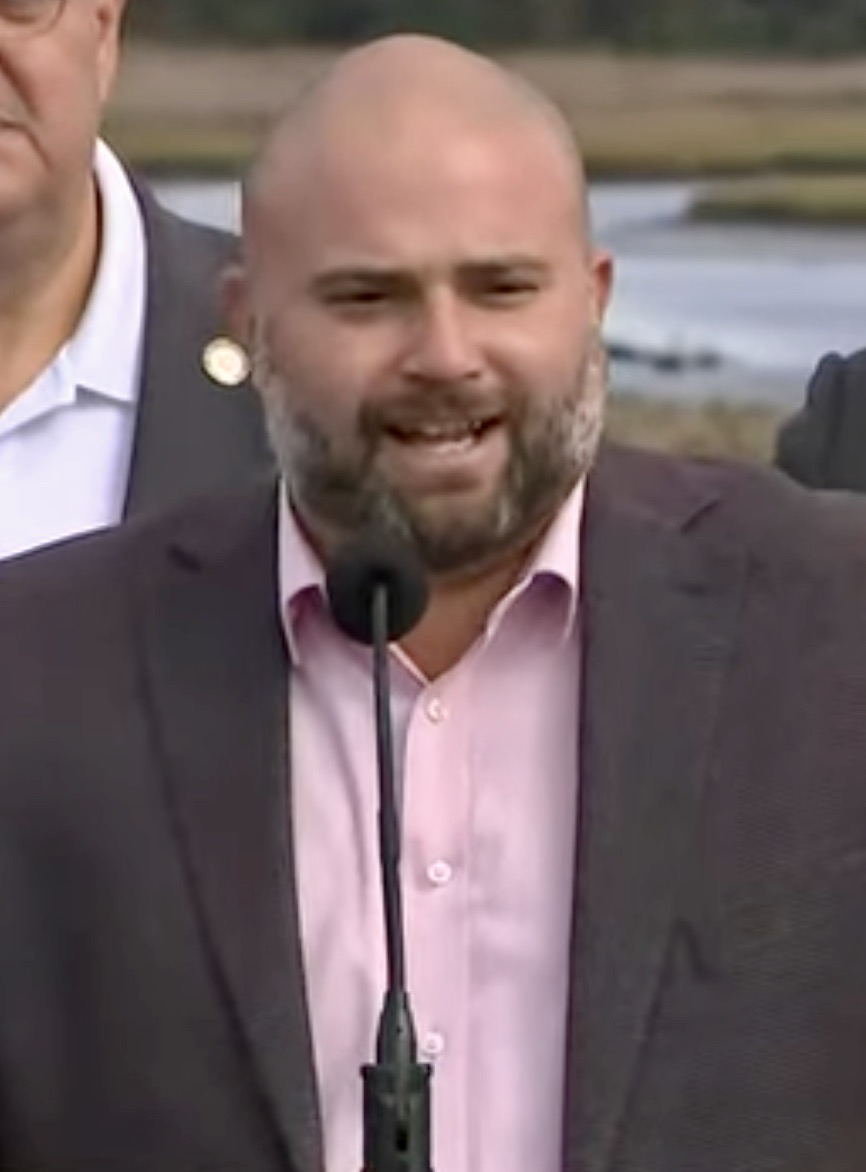
	Majority party
Candidate	Joe Borelli
Party	Republican
Alliance	Conservative
Popular vote	10,108
Percentage	96.7%
Councilmember before election
Joe Borelli
Republican
Elected Councilmember
Joe Borelli
Republican

=== Republican primary ===
==== Nominee ====
- Joe Borelli, incumbent councilmember

==== Endorsements ====
Joe Borelli

Labor unions

- Council of School Supervisors & Administrators
- LiUNA! New York
- New York City Coalition of the International Union of Operating Engineers
- NYC District Council of Carpenters

=== General election ===
==== Results ====
2023 New York City's 51st City Council district election
Party	Candidate	Votes	%
Republican	Joe Borelli	8,519	81.52%
Conservative	Joe Borelli	1,589	15.21%
Total	Joe Borelli (incumbent)	10,108	96.73%
Write-in		342	3.27%
Total votes		10,450	100.0%
Republican hold			
