= New York City's 43rd City Council district =

- Boundaries following the 2020 census

Government
  - Councilmember: . Susan Zhuang. D–Bensonhurst

Population (2020)
  - Total: 161,059

Demographics
  - Asian: 52%
  - White: 29%
  - Hispanic: 14%
  - Black: 1%
  - Other: 2%

Registration
  - Democratic: 50.4%
  - Republican: 19.6%
  - No party preference: 25.9%
- Registered voters (2021) 105,453

New York City's 43rd City Council district is one of 51 districts in the New York City Council. It has been represented by Democrat Susan Zhuang since 2024, succeeding Justin Brannan.

== Geography ==
=== 2020s ===
District 43 is based largely in Bensonhurst and its outlying neighborhoods, including portions of Sunset Park and Dyker Heights and smaller areas in Bath Beach, Borough Park and Gravesend. A majority of the district's population is Asian, and in the run-up to the 2023 election, the district was marked as an "Asian-opportunity district".

The district overlaps with Brooklyn Community Boards 7, 10, 11, 12, 13 and 15, and with New York's 8th, 9th, 10th and 11th congressional districts. It also overlaps with the 17th, 22nd and 23rd districts of the New York State Senate, and with the 45th, 47th, 48th, 49th, and 51st districts of the New York State Assembly.

=== 2010s ===
District 43 was based in Bay Ridge and other neighborhoods along Brooklyn's southwestern waterfront, including Dyker Heights, Bath Beach, and parts of Bensonhurst. Dyker Beach Park and Golf Course was located within the district, as is Calvert Vaux Park.

The district overlapped with Brooklyn Community Boards 10, 11, and 13, and with New York's 10th and 11th congressional districts. It also overlapped with the 22nd and 23rd districts of the New York State Senate, and with the 46th, 47th, 49th, 51st, and 64th districts of the New York State Assembly.

== Members representing the district ==
Members	Party	Years served	Electoral history
District established January 1, 1992
Sal Albanese (Bay Ridge)	Democratic	January 1, 1992 – December 31, 1997	Redistricted from the 31st district and re-elected in 1991. Re-elected in 1993. Retired to run for Mayor of New York.
Marty Golden (Bay Ridge)	Republican	January 1, 1998 – December 31, 2002	Elected in 1997. Re-elected in 2001. Resigned when elected to the New York State Senate.
Vacant		December 31, 2002 – March 18, 2003	
Vincent J. Gentile (Bay Ridge)	Democratic	March 18, 2003 – December 31, 2017	Elected to finish Golden's term. Re-elected in 2003. Re-elected in 2005. Re-elected in 2009. Re-elected in 2013. Termed out.
Justin Brannan (Bay Ridge)	Democratic	January 1, 2018 – December 31, 2023	Elected in 2017. Re-elected in 2021. Redistricted to the 47th district.
Susan Zhuang (Bensonhurst)	Democratic	January 1, 2024 –	Elected in 2023. Re-elected in 2025.

== Recent election results ==
=== 2025 ===
2025 New York City Council election, District 43
Party	Candidate	Votes	%
Democratic	Susan Zhuang	13,194	
Conservative	Susan Zhuang	3,868	
Total	Susan Zhuang (incumbent)	17,062	98.6
Write-in		245	1.4
Total votes		17,307	100.0
Democratic hold			

=== 2023 ===
An interactive map of District 43

Due to redistricting and the 2020 changes to the New York City Charter, councilmembers elected during the 2021 and 2023 City Council elections will serve two-year terms, with full four-year terms resuming after the 2025 New York City Council elections. Primarily due to redistricting, Justin Brannan chose to run in the altered District 47.

2023 New York City Council election, District 43
Primary election
Party	Candidate	Votes	%
Democratic	Susan Zhuang	2,126	58.5
Democratic	Wai Yee Chan	1,127	31.0
Democratic	Stanley Ng	347	9.6
Write-in		32	0.9
Total votes		3,632	100.0
Republican	Ying Tan	425	50.7
Republican	Vito LaBella	394	47.0
Write-in		19	2.3
Total votes		838	100.0
General election
Democratic	Susan Zhuang	4,898	58.7
Republican	Ying Tan	2,188	26.2
Conservative	Vito LaBella	1,215	14.5
Write-in		50	0.6
Total votes		8,351	100
Democratic win (new boundaries)			

=== 2021 ===
In 2019, voters in New York City approved Ballot Question 1, which implemented ranked-choice voting in all local elections. Under the new system, voters have the option to rank up to five candidates for every local office. Voters whose first-choice candidates fare poorly will have their votes redistributed to other candidates in their ranking until one candidate surpasses the 50 percent threshold. If one candidate surpasses 50 percent in first-choice votes, then ranked-choice tabulations will not occur.

2021 New York City Council election, District 43
Party	Candidate	Votes	%
Democratic	Justin Brannan	12,002	
Working Families	Justin Brannan	1,178	
Total	Justin Brannan (incumbent)	13,180	51.1
Republican	Brian Fox	11,387	
Conservative	Brian Fox	1,192	
Total	Brian Fox	12,579	48.7
Write-in		45	0.2
Total votes		25,804	100
Democratic hold			

=== 2017 ===
2017 New York City Council election, District 43
Primary election
Party	Candidate	Votes	%
Democratic	Justin Brannan	3,670	38.7
Democratic	Khader El-Yateem	2,932	30.9
Democratic	Nancy Tong	1,504	15.8
Democratic	Vincent Chirico	761	8.0
Democratic	Kevin Carroll	604	6.4
Write-in		21	0.2
Total votes		9,492	100
Republican	John Quaglione	1,865	47.0
Republican	Liam McCabe	1,318	33.2
Republican	Bob Capano	579	14.6
Republican	Lucretia Regina-Potter	182	4.6
Write-in		23	0.6
Total votes		3,967	100
General election
Democratic	Justin Brannan	11,812	
Working Families	Justin Brannan	1,082	
Total	Justin Brannan	12,894	50.2
Republican	John Quaglione	10,127	
Conservative	John Quaglione	1,720	
Independence	John Quaglione	253	
Total	John Quaglione	12,100	47.1
Reform	Bob Capano	344	1.3
Women's Equality	Angel Medina	281	1.1
Write-in		47	0.2
Total votes		25,667	100
Democratic hold			

=== 2013 ===
2013 New York City Council election, District 43
Party	Candidate	Votes	%
Democratic	Vincent Gentile	12,415	
Working Families	Vincent Gentile	950	
Total	Vincent Gentile (incumbent)	13,365	62.8
Republican	John Quaglione	5,813	
Conservative	John Quaglione	1,569	
Independence	John Quaglione	179	
Total	John Quaglione	7,561	35.5
Green	Patrick Dwyer	349	1.6
Write-in		21	0.1
Total votes		21,296	100
Democratic hold			

=== 2009 ===
2009 New York City Council election, District 43
Party	Candidate	Votes	%
Democratic	Vincent Gentile	12,760	
Working Families	Vincent Gentile	1,119	
Total	Vincent Gentile (incumbent)	13,879	61.7
Republican	Bob Capano	6,826	
Conservative	Bob Capano	1,211	
Independence	Bob Capano	578	
Total	Bob Capano	8,615	38.3
Write-in		2	0.0
Total votes		22,496	100
Democratic hold			
