= Kayla Santosuosso =

American politician

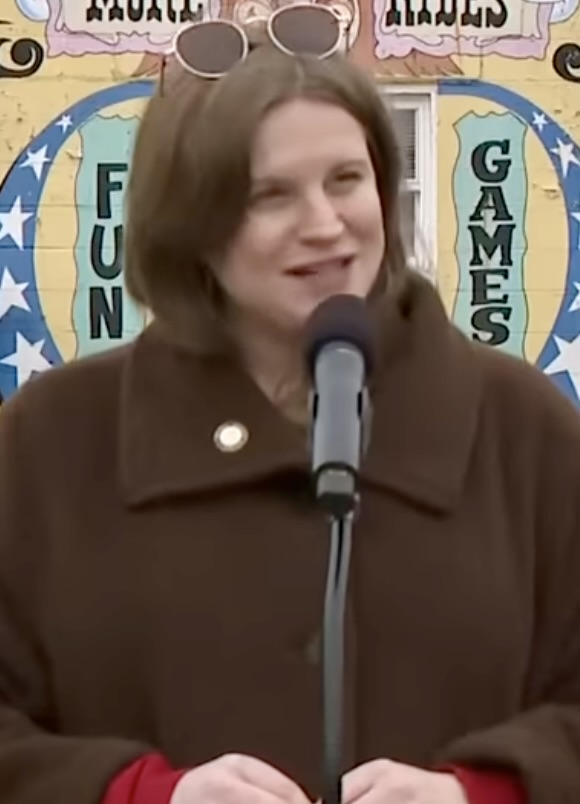
- Santosuosso in 2026

Member of the New York City Council from the 47th district
- Incumbent
- Assumed office January 1, 2026
- Preceded by: Justin Brannan

Personal details
- Born: Kayla Marie Santosuosso; April 2, 1990 (age 36) Ohio, U.S.
- Party: Democratic
- Spouse: Christopher Ghiorzi (m. 2019)
- Education: New York University (BA); New York Law School (JD)

Kayla Marie Santosuosso is an American lawyer and politician who has served as the New York City Council Member for the 47th district since 2026. She previously worked as chief counsel to her predecessor Justin Brannan and as deputy director of the Arab American Association of New York.

== Early life and education ==
An Ohio native, Santosuosso grew up in an Italian-American family in Medina and graduated from Highland High School in 2008. She then attended New York University, where she majored in Middle Eastern and Islamic studies.

== Career ==
After graduating college, Santosuosso worked as an administrative assistant at the Arava Institute in the kibbutz of Ketura, Israel. She then worked at the Arab American Association of New York, becoming its deputy director under Linda Sarsour, and organized for Showing Up for Racial Justice. She volunteered for Bernie Sanders' campaign in the 2016 Democratic presidential primaries.

Amidst tensions following Donald Trump's win in the 2016 presidential election, Santosuosso organized a volunteer project where people signed up to accompany minorities, immigrants and LGBTQ+ people who felt they were being threatened or harassed on their daily commute. Within days, over 6,000 volunteers had signed up to participate. This led to her organizing the Accompany Project and leading trainings on bystander intervention.

She previously co-owned and ran Lock Yard, a bar in Bay Ridge, with her husband, prior to its closing.

=== Political career ===
Santosuosso worked as campaign manager on Khader El-Yateem's campaign for New York City Council in 2017. In the election, she alleged that Bill de Blasio and Emma Wolfe had whipped labor unions to endorse his opponent and eventual primary winner, Justin Brannan. She went on to work as deputy chief of staff to Brannan, then as an attorney for the New York City Law Department, and returned to work in Brannan's office as chief counsel. She is currently president of the Bay Ridge Democrats political club.

=== New York City Council ===
In November 2024, she announced her campaign to succeed Brannan— who ran for Comptroller— in 2025. She was endorsed by him and state senator Andrew Gounardes. She defeated Fedir Usmanov in the Democratic primary with 81.1% of the vote and faced Republican George Sarantopoulous in the general election. She criticized the New York City Board of Elections for certifying the Republican primary election after findings of at least 22 instances of voter fraud were announced in the race between Sarantopoulous and his rival, Richie Barsamian. She defeated Sarantopoulous in the general election with 59.3% of the vote.

== Personal life ==
Santosuosso moved to Bay Ridge, Brooklyn, in 2013 and lives there with her husband, Christopher Ghiorzi; they ran Lock Yard, a bar, together.

Although of Italian-American heritage, Santosuosso speaks Arabic and is involved in South Brooklyn's sizeable Arab American community.

== Electoral history ==
=== 2025 ===
2025 New York City Council Democratic primary, District 47
Party	Candidate	Votes	%
Democratic	Kayla Santosuosso	10,466	79.0
Democratic	Fedir Usmanov	2,685	20.3
Write-in		91	0.7
Total votes		13,242	100.0

2025 New York City Council election, District 47
Party	Candidate	Votes	%
Democratic	Kayla Santosuosso	19,610	50.2
Working Families	Kayla Santosuosso	3,525	9.0
Total	Kayla Santosuosso	23,135	59.3
Republican	George Sarantopoulos	14,322	36.7
Conservative	George Sarantopoulos	1,497	3.8
Total	George Sarantopoulos	15,819	40.5
Write-in		83	0.2
Total votes		39,037	100.0
Democratic hold			
