= 2013 New York City Council election =

- November 5, 2013

All 51 seats on the New York City Council 26 seats needed for a majority
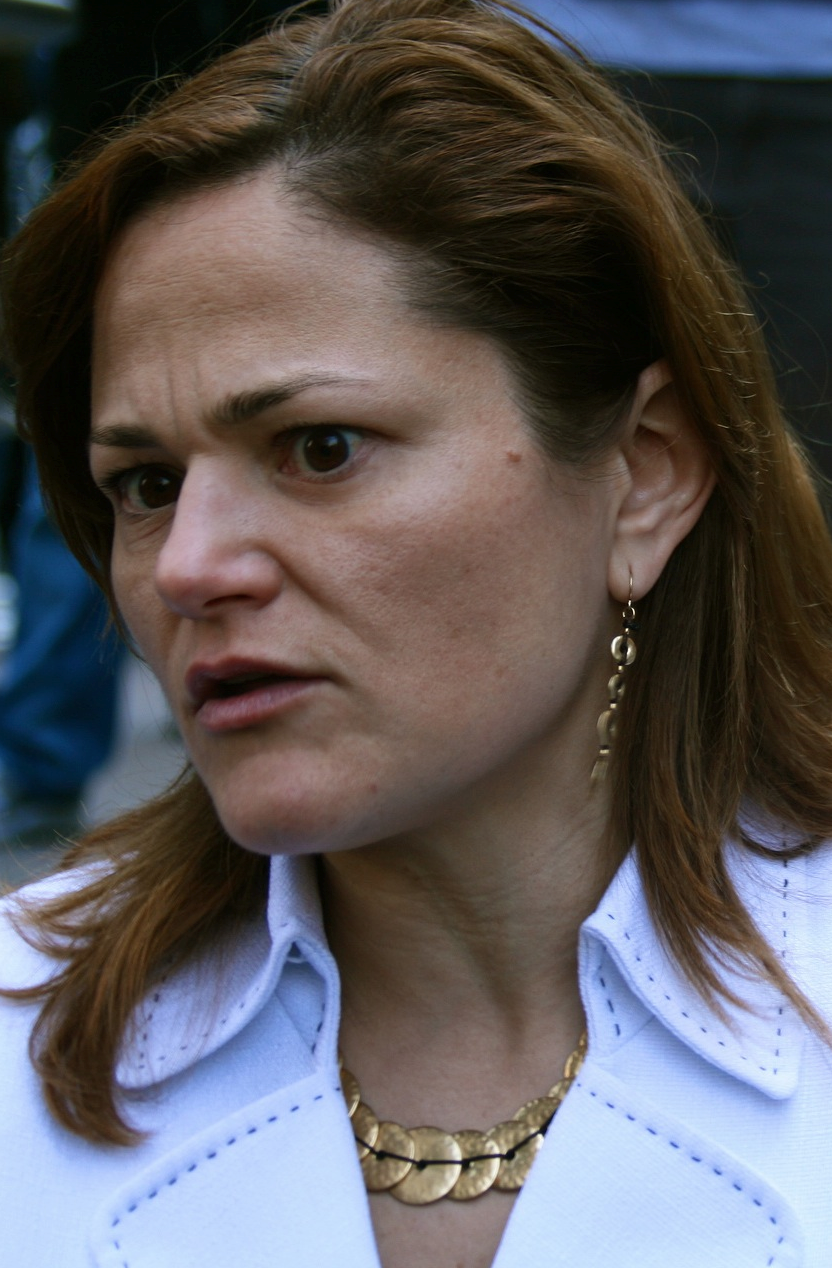

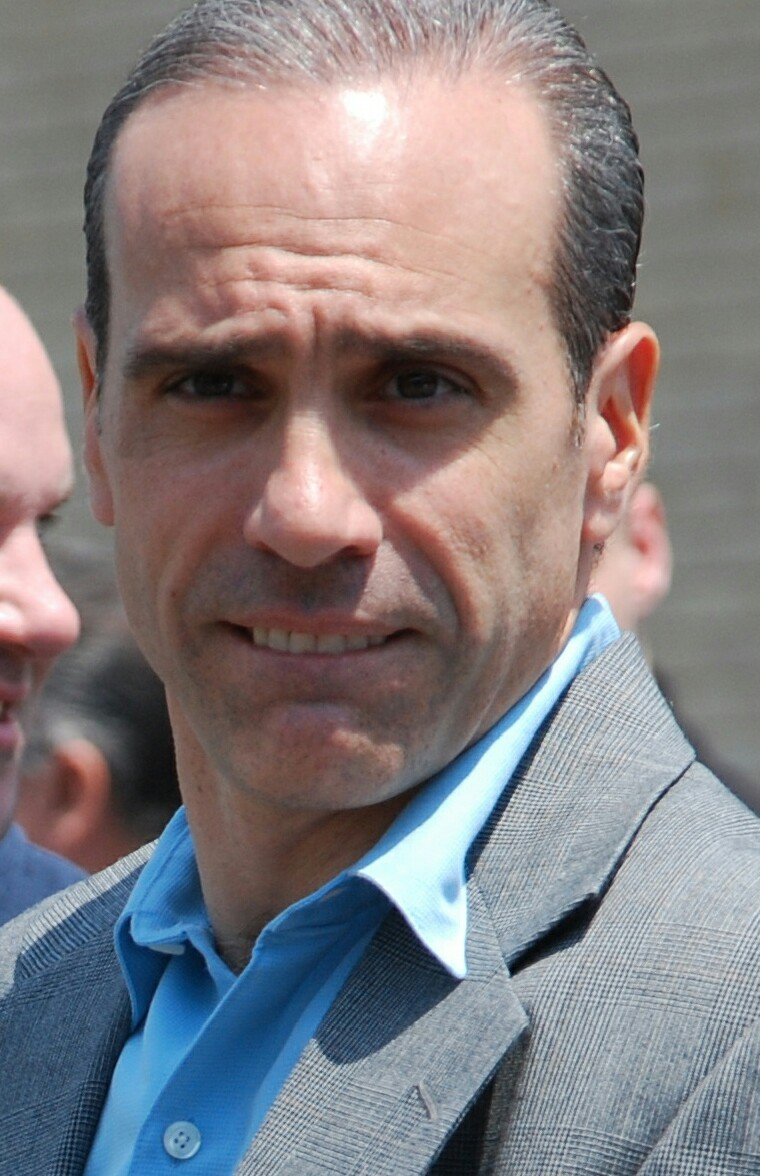
	Majority party	Minority party
Leader	Melissa Mark-Viverito	James Oddo
Party	Democratic	Republican
Leader's seat	8th-Manhattan	50th-Staten Island
Last election	46 seats	4 seats
Seats won	48	3
Seat change	▲2	▼1
Popular vote	655,394	133,337
Percentage	78.99%	16.07%
- Results by district.
Speaker before election
Christine Quinn
Democratic
Elected Speaker
Melissa Mark-Viverito
Democratic

Elections for members of the New York City Council were held in 2013. Primary elections were held on September 10, 2013, for all 51 districts of the city council. Many incumbents are termed out of office, while others were defeated in the primary, resulting in the largest turnover of council members since 2001, when 36 new members were nominated and elected to office in the council. Those who won their primaries without another contending party in the same district are considered the effective winner of the seat outright.

== Incumbents not seeking reelection ==
=== Term-limited incumbents ===
17 incumbent councilors (16 Democrats and 1 Republican) were prevented from seeking a 4th consecutive term by term limits.

1. Christine Quinn (D), District 3
2. Gale Brewer (D), District 6
3. Robert Jackson (D), District 7
4. Oliver Koppell (D), District 11
5. Joel Rivera (D), District 15
6. Helen Foster (D), District 16
7. Peter Vallone Jr. (D), District 22
8. James F. Gennaro (D), District 24
9. Leroy Comrie (D), District 27
10. Diana Reyna (D), District 34
11. Albert Vann (D), District 36
12. Erik Martin Dilan (D), District 37
13. Charles Barron (D), District 42
14. Lewis A. Fidler (D), District 46
15. Domenic Recchia (D), District 47
16. Michael Chaim Nelson (D), District 48
17. James Oddo (R), District 50

=== Retiring incumbents ===
1. Jessica Lappin (D), District 5
2. Dan Halloran (R), District 19
3. Letitia James (WFP), District 35

== Incumbents defeated ==
=== In primary election ===
One incumbent Democrat was defeated in the September primary election.

- Sara M. Gonzalez (D), District 38

== Results ==
=== Manhattan ===
==== District 1 ====
Democratic primary

Endorsements

Jenifer Rajkumar

Individuals

- Peter Kwong, professor of Asian American studies at Hunter College

Results

New York City Council elections District 1 Democratic primary, September 10, 2013
Party	Candidate	Votes	%
Democratic	Margaret Chin (incumbent)	8,846	58.9
Democratic	Jenifer Rajkumar	6,171	41.1
n/a	Write-ins	7	0.0
Total votes		15,024	100

General election

New York City Council elections District 1 election, November 5, 2013
Party	Candidate	Votes	%
Democratic	Margaret Chin	5,126	
Working Families	Margaret Chin	486	
Total	Margaret Chin (incumbent)	5,612	97.7
n/a	Write-ins	131	2.3
Total votes		5,743	100

==== District 2 ====
Democratic primary

New York City Council elections District 2 Democratic primary, September 10, 2013
Party	Candidate	Votes	%
Democratic	Rosie Mendez (incumbent)	12,507	81.6
Democratic	Richard Del Rio	2,809	18.3
Democratic	Write-ins	13	0.1
Total votes		15,329	100

General election

New York City Council elections District 2 election, November 5, 2013
Party	Candidate	Votes	%
Democratic	Rosie Mendez	18,928	
Working Families	Rosie Mendez	1,491	
Total	Rosie Mendez (incumbent)	20,419	92.9
Green	Miles Budde	1,490	6.8
n/a	Write-ins	59	0.3
Total votes		21,968	100

==== District 3 ====
Democratic primary

Endorsements

Corey Johnson

Federal officials

- David Cicilline, U.S. Representative from RI-01
- Barney Frank, U.S. Representative from MA-04
- Jared Polis, U.S. Representative from CO-02

Individuals

- Elizabeth Birch, former executive director of Human Rights Campaign
- Dustin Lance Black, screenwriter
- Kate Bornstein, author and sociologist
- Hector Figueroa, President of the SEIU 32BJ
- Tim Gunn, television personality
- Sean Strub, author and activist
- Evan Wolfson, attorney and activist

Labor unions

- Retail, Wholesale and Department Store Union
- SEIU 32BJ
- United Food and Commercial Workers
Yetta Kurland

Labor unions

- Communications Workers of America
- New York Metro Area Postal Union
- Transport Workers Union of America

Results

New York City Council elections District 3 Democratic primary, September 10, 2013
Party	Candidate	Votes	%
Democratic	Corey Johnson	12,535	63.3
Democratic	Yetta Kurland	7,275	36.7
n/a	Write-ins	6	0.0
Total votes		19,816	100

General election

New York City Council elections District 3 election, November 5, 2013
Party	Candidate	Votes	%
Democratic	Corey Johnson	21,692	
Working Families	Corey Johnson	1,916	
Total	Corey Johnson	23,608	86.3
Republican	Richard Stewart	3,691	13.5
n/a	Write-ins	72	0.2
Total votes		27,371	100

==== District 4 ====
Incumbent Democrat Daniel Garodnick was unopposed in the Democratic primary.

New York City Council elections District 4 election, November 5, 2013
Party	Candidate	Votes	%
Democratic	Daniel Garodnick	20,401	
Working Families	Daniel Garodnick	965	
Total	Daniel Garodnick (incumbent)	21,366	70.5
Republican	Helene Jnane	8,620	
Libertarian	Helene Jnane	291	
Total	Helene Jnane	8,911	29.4
n/a	Write-ins	27	0.1
Total votes		30,304	100

==== District 5 ====
Democratic primary

New York City Council elections District 5 Democratic primary, September 10, 2013
Party	Candidate	Votes	%
Democratic	Benjamin Kallos	7,513	45.9
Democratic	Micah Kellner	6,420	39.2
Democratic	Ed Hartzog	2,429	14.8
Democratic	Write-ins	5	0.0
Total votes		16,367	100

General election

New York City Council elections District 5 election, November 5, 2013
Party	Candidate	Votes	%
Democratic	Benjamin Kallos	18,135	57.1
Republican	David Garland	9,443	
Dump the Dump	David Garland	467	
Independence	David Garland	390	
Libertarian	David Garland	175	
Liberal	David Garland	24	
Save 2nd Avenue	David Garland	19	
Total	David Garland	10,518	33.1
Working Families	Micah Kellner	3,118	9.8
n/a	Write-ins	12	0.0
Total votes		31,783	100

==== District 6 ====
Democratic primary

New York City Council elections District 6 Democratic primary, September 10, 2013
Party	Candidate	Votes	%
Democratic	Helen Rosenthal	7,716	26.8
Democratic	Mel Wymore	6,440	22.4
Democratic	Marc Landis	5,566	19.4
Democratic	Noah Gotbaum	3,512	12.2
Democratic	Ken Biberaj	2,645	9.2
Democratic	Debra Cooper	2,482	8.6
Democratic	Aaron Braunstein	387	1.3
Democratic	David Curtiss (write-in)	1	0.0
Total votes		28,749	100

General election

New York City Council elections District 6 election, November 5, 2013
Party	Candidate	Votes	%
Democratic	Helen Rosenthal	29,586	78.2
Republican	Harry DeMell	4,928	13.0
Working Families	Marc Landis	2,538	6.7
Green	Tom Siracuse	737	1.9
n/a	Write-ins	26	0.1
Total votes		37,815	100

==== District 7 ====
Democratic primary

New York City Council elections District 7 Democratic primary, September 10, 2013
Party	Candidate	Votes	%
Democratic	Mark D. Levine	7,454	41.4
Democratic	Joyce Johnson	3,108	17.3
Democratic	Luis Tejada	2,561	14.2
Democratic	Manuel Lantigua	1,354	7.5
Democratic	Alicia Barksdale	821	4.6
Democratic	David Sasscer-Burgos	679	3.8
Democratic	Zead Ramadan	657	3.6
Democratic	Mark Otto	619	3.4
Democratic	Ruben Dario Vargas	523	2.9
Democratic	Brodie Enoch	231	1.3
Democratic	Write-ins	3	0.0
Total votes		18,010	100

General election

New York City Council elections District 7 election, November 5, 2013
Party	Candidate	Votes	%
Democratic	Mark D. Levine	18,105	
Working Families	Mark D. Levine	1,168	
Total	Mark D. Levine	19,273	87.5
Green	Christina Gonzalez	1,700	7.7
Democratic	Luis Tejada (write-in)	960	4.4
n/a	Write-ins	101	0.4
Total votes		22,034	100

==== District 9 ====
Democratic primary

New York City Council elections District 9 Democratic primary, September 10, 2013
Party	Candidate	Votes	%
Democratic	Inez Dickens (incumbent)	12,878	69.9
Democratic	Vince Morgan	5,525	30.0
Democratic	Write-ins	9	0.1
Total votes		18,412	100

General election

New York City Council elections District 9 election, November 5, 2013
Party	Candidate	Votes	%
Democratic	Inez Dickens (incumbent)	23,454	99.1
n/a	Write-ins	222	0.9
Total votes		23,676	100

==== District 10 ====
Democratic primary

New York City Council elections District 10 Democratic primary, September 10, 2013
Party	Candidate	Votes	%
Democratic	Ydanis Rodriguez (incumbent)	10,157	70.8
Democratic	Cheryl Pahaham	3,219	22.4
Democratic	F. Castellanos Rodriguez	967	6.7
Democratic	Joyce Johnson (write-in)	1	0.0
Total votes		14,344	100

General election

New York City Council elections District 10 election, November 5, 2013
Party	Candidate	Votes	%
Democratic	Ydanis Rodriguez	17,326	
Working Families	Ydanis Rodriguez	1,154	
Total	Ydanis Rodriguez (incumbent)	18,480	89.6
Republican	Ronnie Cabrera	1,595	7.7
School Choice	Miguel Estrella	497	2.4
n/a	Write-ins	43	0.2
Total votes		20,615	100

=== Manhattan/Bronx crossover ===
==== District 8 ====
Democratic primary

New York City Council elections District 8 Democratic primary, September 10, 2013
Party	Candidate	Votes	%
Democratic	Melissa Mark-Viverito (incumbent)	3,768	35.7
Democratic	Ralina Cardona	1,899	18.0
Democratic	Ed Santos	1,710	16.2
Democratic	Tamika Humphreys	1,215	11.5
Democratic	Sean Gardner	987	9.3
Democratic	Gwen Goodwin	986	9.3
Democratic	Write-ins	2	0.0
Total votes		10,567	100

General election

New York City Council elections District 8 election, November 5, 2013
Party	Candidate	Votes	%
Democratic	Melissa Mark-Viverito	13,855	
Working Families	Melissa Mark-Viverito	442	
Total	Melissa Mark-Viverito (incumbent)	14,297	93.8
Republican	Ralina Cardona	793	5.2
Libertarian	Christopher Giattino	131	0.9
n/a	Write-ins	23	0.2
Total votes		15,244	100

=== The Bronx ===
==== District 11 ====
Democratic primary

New York City Council elections District 11 Democratic primary, September 10, 2013
Party	Candidate	Votes	%
Democratic	Andrew Cohen	8,039	68.4
Democratic	Clifford Stanton	3,711	31.6
Democratic	John Martin (write-in)	1	0.0
Total votes		11,751	100

General election

New York City Council elections District 11 election, November 5, 2013
Party	Candidate	Votes	%
Democratic	Andrew Cohen	14,715	
Working Families	Andrew Cohen	949	
Total	Andrew Cohen	15,664	79.6
Republican	Patricia Brink	2,379	12.1
School Choice	Cheryl Keeling	552	2.8
Conservative	William Kalaidjian	542	2.8
Green	John Reynolds	508	2.6
n/a	Write-ins	22	0.1
Total votes		19,667	100

==== District 12 ====
Democratic primary

New York City Council elections District 12 Democratic primary, September 10, 2013
Party	Candidate	Votes	%
Democratic	Andy King (incumbent)	8,638	57.4
Democratic	Pamela Johnson	4,907	32.6
Democratic	Lenford Edie	757	5.0
Democratic	Adeyemi Toba	757	5.0
Democratic	Write-ins	2	0.0
Total votes		15,061	100

General election

New York City Council elections District 12 election, November 5, 2013
Party	Candidate	Votes	%
Democratic	Andy King	21,044	
Working Families	Andy King	546	
Total	Andy King (incumbent)	21,590	95.6
Republican	Robert Diamond	571	
Conservative	Robert Diamond	133	
Total	Robert Diamond	704	3.1
Green	Trevor Archer	274	1.2
n/a	Write-ins	17	0.1
Total votes		22,585	100

==== District 13 ====
Incumbent Democrat James Vacca was unopposed in the Democratic primary.

New York City Council elections District 13 election, November 5, 2013
Party	Candidate	Votes	%
Democratic	James Vacca	13,793	83.2
Republican	William Britt	2,103	
Conservative	William Britt	665	
Total	William Britt	2,768	16.7
n/a	Write-ins	11	0.1
Total votes		16,572	100

==== District 14 ====
Democratic primary

New York City Council elections District 14 Democratic primary, September 10, 2013
Party	Candidate	Votes	%
Democratic	Fernando Cabrera (incumbent)	4,479	74.7
Democratic	Israel Martinez	1,507	25.2
Democratic	Write-ins	6	0.1
Total votes		5,992	100

General election

New York City Council elections District 14 election, November 5, 2013
Party	Candidate	Votes	%
Democratic	Fernando Cabrera	2,412	
Working Families	Fernando Cabrera	87	
Total	Fernando Cabrera (incumbent)	2,499	94.4
Republican	Denise Butler	114	4.3
Conservative	Alan Reed	30	1.1
n/a	Write-ins	3	0.1
Total votes		2,646	100

==== District 15 ====
Democratic primary

New York City Council elections District 15 Democratic primary, September 10, 2013
Party	Candidate	Votes	%
Democratic	Ritchie Torres	2,771	36.1
Democratic	Joel Rivera	1,641	21.4
Democratic	Cynthia Thompkins	1,609	21.0
Democratic	Albert Alvarez	690	9.0
Democratic	Raquel Batista	569	7.4
Democratic	Joel Bauza	392	5.1
Democratic	Write-ins	3	0.0
Total votes		7,675	100

General election

New York City Council elections District 15 election, November 5, 2013
Party	Candidate	Votes	%
Democratic	Ritchie Torres	9,341	
Working Families	Ritchie Torres	262	
Total	Ritchie Torres	9,603	91.1
Republican	Joel Rivera	758	7.2
Conservative	Joel Bauza	154	1.5
n/a	Write-ins	21	0.2
Total votes		10,536	100

==== District 16 ====
Democratic primary

New York City Council elections District 16 Democratic primary, September 10, 2013
Party	Candidate	Votes	%
Democratic	Vanessa Gibson	4,561	44.1
Democratic	Pedro Alvarez	1,732	16.8
Democratic	Carlos Sierra	1,483	14.4
Democratic	Daryl Johnson	795	7.7
Democratic	Naaimat Muhammed	677	6.6
Democratic	Carlton Berkley	606	5.9
Democratic	Bola Omotosho	477	4.6
Democratic	Write-ins	1	0.0
Total votes		10,332	100

General election

New York City Council elections District 16 election, November 5, 2013
Party	Candidate	Votes	%
Democratic	Vanessa Gibson	12,514	91.1
Independence	Carlos Sierra	595	4.3
Jobs & Education	Walter Newsome	389	2.8
Republican	Benjamin Eggleston	188	
Conservative	Benjamin Eggleston	55	
Total	Benjamin Eggleston	243	1.8
n/a	Write-ins	2	0.0
Total votes		13,743	100

==== District 17 ====
Democratic primary

New York City Council elections District 17 Democratic primary, September 10, 2013
Party	Candidate	Votes	%
Democratic	Maria del Carmen Arroyo (incumbent)	4,740	69.3
Democratic	Julio Pabon	2,101	30.7
Democratic	Naaimat Muhammed (write-in)	1	0.0
Total votes		6,842	100

General election

New York City Council elections District 17 election, November 5, 2013
Party	Candidate	Votes	%
Democratic	Maria del Carmen Arroyo (incumbent)	10,845	93.1
Republican	José Colon	580	5.0
Conservative	Selsia Evans	211	1.8
n/a	Write-ins	18	0.2
Total votes		11,654	100

==== District 18 ====
Democratic primary

New York City Council elections District 18 Democratic primary, September 10, 2013
Party	Candidate	Votes	%
Democratic	Annabel Palma (incumbent)	6,244	70.7
Democratic	William Moore	2,588	29.3
Total votes		8,832	100

General election

New York City Council elections District 18 election, November 5, 2013
Party	Candidate	Votes	%
Democratic	Annabel Palma	14,161	
Working Families	Annabel Palma	391	
Total	Annabel Palma (incumbent)	14,552	89.3
Republican	Lamont Paul	558	3.4
Jobs & Education	William Moore	536	3.3
Green	Walter Nestler	262	
Progressive Party	Walter Nestler	57	
Total	Walter Nestler	319	2.0
Conservative	Eduardo Ramirez	302	1.9
n/a	Write-ins	21	0.1
Total votes		16,288	100

=== Bronx/Queens crossover ===
==== District 22 ====
Democratic primary

New York City Council elections District 22 Democratic primary, September 10, 2013
Party	Candidate	Votes	%
Democratic	Costa Constantinides	4,461	55.7
Democratic	John Ciafone	1,791	22.4
Democratic	Constantinos Prentzas	1,750	21.9
Democratic	Daniell De Stefano (write-in)	1	0.0
Total votes		8,003	100

General election

New York City Council elections District 22 election, November 5, 2013
Party	Candidate	Votes	%
Democratic	Costa Constantinides	10,171	
Working Families	Costa Constantinides	711	
Total	Costa Constantinides	10,882	65.4
Green	Lynn Serpe	2,461	14.8
Republican	Daniel Peterson	1,884	11.3
Conservative	Danielle De Stefano	1,018	
Independence	Danielle De Stefano	295	
Total	Danielle De Stefano	1,313	7.9
Populist	Gerald Kann	65	0.4
n/a	Write-ins	24	0.1
Total votes		16,629	100

=== Queens ===
==== District 19 ====
Democratic primary

New York City Council elections District 19 Democratic primary, September 10, 2013
Party	Candidate	Votes	%
Democratic	Paul Vallone	2,922	31.1
Democratic	Austin Shafran	2,728	29.1
Democratic	Paul Graziano	1,602	17.1
Democratic	John Duane	1,164	12.4
Democratic	Chrissy Voskerichian	963	10.3
Total votes		9,379	100

General election

New York City Council elections District 19 election, November 5, 2013
Party	Candidate	Votes	%
Democratic	Paul Vallone	12,791	
Independence	Paul Vallone	610	
Total	Paul Vallone	13,401	57.3
Republican	Dennis Saffran	8,178	
Conservative	Dennis Saffran	1,469	
Reform	Dennis Saffran	318	
Total	Dennis Saffran	9,965	42.6
n/a	Write-ins	18	0.1
Total votes		23,384	100
Democratic gain from Republican			

==== District 20 ====
Incumbent Democrat Peter Koo was unopposed in the Democratic primary.

New York City Council elections District 20 election, November 5, 2013
Party	Candidate	Votes	%
Democratic	Peter Koo	7,985	
Conservative	Peter Koo	1,088	
Total	Peter Koo (incumbent)	9,073	79.7
Jobs & Education	Martha Flores-Vasquez	1,182	10.4
Independence	Sunny Hahn	729	6.4
Green	Evergreen Chou	385	3.4
n/a	Write-ins	20	0.2
Total votes		11,389	100

==== District 21 ====
Incumbent Democrat Julissa Ferreras was unopposed in the Democratic primary

New York City Council elections District 21 election, November 5, 2013
Party	Candidate	Votes	%
Democratic	Julissa Ferreras (incumbent)	8,325	99.7
n/a	Write-ins	23	0.3
Total votes		8,348	100

==== District 23 ====
Incumbent Democrat Mark Weprin was unopposed in the Democratic primary

New York City Council elections District 23 election, November 5, 2013
Party	Candidate	Votes	%
Democratic	Mark Weprin (incumbent)	16,788	84.0
Reform	Joseph Concannon	3,172	15.9
n/a	Write-ins	26	0.1
Total votes		19,986	100

==== District 24 ====
Democratic primary

New York City Council elections District 24 Democratic primary, September 10, 2013
Party	Candidate	Votes	%
Democratic	Rory Lancman	5,090	61.7
Democratic	Andrea Veras	1,751	21.2
Democratic	Mujib Rahman	1,403	17.0
Democratic	Write-ins	2	0.0
Total votes		8,246	100

General election

New York City Council elections District 24 election, November 5, 2013
Party	Candidate	Votes	%
Democratic	Rory Lancman	11,744	
Working Families	Rory Lancman	655	
Total	Rory Lancman	12,399	73.7
Republican	Alexander Blishteyn	2,907	
Conservative	Alexander Blishteyn	462	
Total	Alexander Blishteyn	3,369	20.0
Faith and Values	Mujib Rahman	1,043	6.2
n/a	Write-ins	18	0.1
Total votes		16,829	100

==== District 25 ====
Incumbent Democrat Daniel Dromm was unopposed in the Democratic primary

New York City Council elections District 24 election, November 5, 2013
Party	Candidate	Votes	%
Democratic	Daniel Dromm	9,923	
Working Families	Daniel Dromm	1,100	
Total	Daniel Dromm (incumbent)	11,023	99.6
n/a	Write-ins	43	0.4
Total votes		11,066	100

==== District 26 ====
Incumbent Democrat Jimmy Van Bramer was unopposed in the Democratic primary

New York City Council elections District 24 election, November 5, 2013
Party	Candidate	Votes	%
Democratic	Jimmy Van Bramer	12,897	
Working Families	Jimmy Van Bramer	1,506	
Total	Jimmy Van Bramer (incumbent)	14,403	99.3
n/a	Write-ins	94	0.7
Total votes		14,497	100

==== District 27 ====
Democratic primary

New York City Council elections District 27 Democratic primary, September 10, 2013
Party	Candidate	Votes	%
Democratic	Daneek Miller	3,982	24.3
Democratic	Clyde Vanel	3,521	21.5
Democratic	Joan Flowers	3,463	21.2
Democratic	Manuel Caughman	2,898	17.7
Democratic	Greg Mays	1,845	11.3
Democratic	Sondra Peeden	644	3.9
Total votes		16,353	100

General election

New York City Council elections District 27 election, November 5, 2013
Party	Candidate	Votes	%
Democratic	Daneek Miller	20,248	
Working Families	Daneek Miller	662	
Total	Daneek Miller	20,910	96.7
Independence	Sondra Peeden	680	3.1
n/a	Write-ins	31	0.1
Total votes		21,621	100

==== District 28 ====
Democratic primary

New York City Council elections District 28 Democratic primary, September 10, 2013
Party	Candidate	Votes	%
Democratic	Ruben Wills (incumbent)	5,095	48.9
Democratic	Hettie Powell	3,435	33.0
Democratic	Eugen Evans	1,080	10.4
Democratic	David Kayode	809	7.8
Democratic	Mary Beamon (write-in)	1	0.0
Total votes		10,420	100

General election

New York City Council elections District 28 election, November 5, 2013
Party	Candidate	Votes	%
Democratic	Ruben Wills (incumbent)	14,996	95.4
Unity	Mireille Leroy	731	4.6
n/a	Write-ins	20	0.1
Total votes		15,747	100

==== District 29 ====
Incumbent Democrat Karen Koslowitz was unopposed in the Democratic primary.

New York City Council elections District 29 election, November 5, 2013
Party	Candidate	Votes	%
Democratic	Karen Koslowitz	14,173	
Working Families	Karen Koslowitz	1,355	
Total	Karen Koslowitz (incumbent)	15,528	91.3
Civic Virtue	Jon Torodash	1,433	8.4
n/a	Write-ins	53	0.3
Total votes		17,014	100

==== District 30 ====
Incumbent Democrat Elizabeth Crowley was unopposed in the Democratic primary.

New York City Council elections District 30 election, November 5, 2013
Party	Candidate	Votes	%
Democratic	Elizabeth Crowley	9,050	
Working Families	Elizabeth Crowley	840	
Total	Elizabeth Crowley (incumbent)	9,890	58.9
Republican	Craig Caruana	5,810	
Conservative	Craig Caruana	1,063	
Total	Craig Caruana	6,873	41.0
n/a	Write-ins	18	0.1
Total votes		16,781	100

==== District 31 ====
Democratic primary

New York City Council elections District 31 Democratic primary, September 10, 2013
Party	Candidate	Votes	%
Democratic	Donovan Richards (incumbent)	6,762	51.6
Democratic	Michael Duncan	4,696	35.8
Democratic	Ricardo Brown	1,648	12.6
Democratic	Write-ins	2	0.0
Total votes		13,103	100

General election

New York City Council elections District 31 election, November 5, 2013
Party	Candidate	Votes	%
Democratic	Donovan Richards (incumbent)	18,182	91.8
Republican	Scherie Murray	1,079	5.4
Jobs & Education	Ricardo Brown	530	2.7
n/a	Write-ins	22	0.1
Total votes		19,813	100

==== District 32 ====
Incumbent Republican Eric Ulrich was unopposed in the Republican primary. Democratic primary

New York City Council elections District 32 Democratic primary, September 10, 2013
Party	Candidate	Votes	%
Democratic	Lew Simon	4,135	65.7
Democratic	William Ruiz	2,158	34.2
Democratic	Write-ins	3	0.0
Total votes		6,296	100

General election

New York City Council elections District 32 election, November 5, 2013
Party	Candidate	Votes	%
Republican	Eric Ulrich	8,512	
Conservative	Eric Ulrich	1,478	
Independence	Eric Ulrich	498	
Total	Eric Ulrich (incumbent)	10,488	53.6
Democratic	Lew Simon	9,080	46.4
n/a	Write-ins	13	0.1
Total votes		19,581	100

=== Queens/Brooklyn crossover ===
==== District 34 ====
===== Democratic primary =====
Endorsements

Antonio Reynoso

Federal officials

- Nydia Velázquez, U.S. Representative

State officials

- Frank Seddio, former state assemblyman and chairman of the Brooklyn Democratic Party

Local officials

- Bill de Blasio, New York City Public Advocate and candidate for mayor of New York
- Dan Garodnick, NYC Councilor
- Melinda Katz, former NYC Councilor
- Marty Markowitz, Brooklyn Borough President
- Christine Quinn, Speaker of the New York City Council
- Diana Reyna, NYC Councilor

Individuals

- Ana Maria Archila, co-director of Make the Road Action
- Lincoln Restler, president of the New Kings Democrats

Labor unions

- 1199SEIU United Healthcare Workers East
- DC 37
- Hotel and Gaming Trades Council
- United Federation of Teachers

Organizations

- Make the Road Action
- National Organization for Women

===== Results =====
New York City Council elections District 34 Democratic primary, September 10, 2013
Party	Candidate	Votes	%
Democratic	Antonio Reynoso	6,205	50.2
Democratic	Vito J. Lopez	4,551	36.8
Democratic	Gladys Santiago	967	7.8
Democratic	Humberto Soto	632	5.1
Democratic	Write-ins	3	0.0
Total votes		12,358	100

Working Families primary

New York City Council elections District 34 Working Families primary, September 10, 2013
Party	Candidate	Votes	%
Working Families	Antonio Reynoso (write-in)	8	80.0
Working Families	Tao Lyn (write-in)	1	10.0
Working Families	Write-ins	1	10.0
Total votes		10	100

General election

New York City Council elections District 34 election, November 5, 2013
Party	Candidate	Votes	%
Democratic	Antonio Reynoso	13,123	
Working Families	Antonio Reynoso	1,313	
Total	Antonio Reynoso	13,581	95.9
School Choice	Gladys Santiago	557	3.9
n/a	Write-ins	28	0.2
Total votes		14,166	100

=== Brooklyn ===
==== District 33 ====
Democratic primary

New York City Council elections District 33 Democratic primary, September 10, 2013
Party	Candidate	Votes	%
Democratic	Stephen Levin (incumbent)	13,608	73.5
Democratic	Stephen Pierson	4,902	26.5
Democratic	Write-ins	8	0.0
Total votes		18,518	100

General election

New York City Council elections District 33 election, November 5, 2013
Party	Candidate	Votes	%
Democratic	Stephen Levin	17,094	
Working Families	Stephen Levin	2,465	
Total	Stephen Levin (incumbent)	19,559	91.9
Conservative	John Jasilli	1,666	7.9
n/a	Write-ins	56	0.3
Total votes		21,281	100

==== District 35 ====
Democratic primary

New York City Council elections District 35 Democratic primary, September 10, 2013
Party	Candidate	Votes	%
Democratic	Laurie Cumbo	7,561	36.2
Democratic	Olanike Alabi	5,369	25.7
Democratic	Ede Fox	5,340	26.0
Democratic	Jelani Mashariki	1,341	6.4
Democratic	Frank Hurley	1,245	6.0
Democratic	Write-ins	3	0.0
Total votes		20,859	100

General election

New York City Council elections District 35 election, November 5, 2013
Party	Candidate	Votes	%
Democratic	Laurie Cumbo	23,164	
Working Families	Laurie Cumbo	3,321	
Total	Laurie Cumbo	26,485	99.7
n/a	Write-ins	80	0.3
Total votes		26,565	100
Democratic gain from Working Families			

==== District 36 ====
Democratic primary

New York City Council elections District 36 Democratic primary, September 10, 2013
Party	Candidate	Votes	%
Democratic	Robert Cornegy	4,370	30.3
Democratic	Kirsten Foy	4,302	29.8
Democratic	Robert Waterman	3,149	21.8
Democratic	Conrad Tillard	1,912	13.3
Democratic	Reginald Swiney	674	4.7
Democratic	Write-ins	6	0.0
Total votes		14,413	100

General election

New York City Council elections District 36 election, November 5, 2013
Party	Candidate	Votes	%
Democratic	Robert Cornegy	17,334	87.3
Working Families	Kirsten Foy	2,020	10.2
Republican	Veronica Thompson	498	2.5
n/a	Write-ins	10	0.1
Total votes		19,862	100

==== District 37 ====
Democratic primary

New York City Council elections District 37 Democratic primary, September 10, 2013
Party	Candidate	Votes	%
Democratic	Rafael Espinal	3,538	45.8
Democratic	Kimberly Council	2,459	31.9
Democratic	Heriberto Mateo	927	12.0
Democratic	Helal Sheikh	792	10.3
Total votes		7,716	100

General election

New York City Council elections District 37 election, November 5, 2013
Party	Candidate	Votes	%
Democratic	Rafael Espinal	9,058	86.0
Working Families	Kimberly Council	1,235	11.7
Conservative	Michael Freeman-Saulsberre	230	2.2
n/a	Write-ins	4	0.1
Total votes		10,527	100

==== District 38 ====
===== Democratic primary =====
Endorsements

Carlos Menchaca

Federal officials

- Nydia Velázquez, U.S. Representative

Local officials

- Brad Lander, NYC Councilmember

Results

New York City Council elections District 38 Democratic primary, September 10, 2013
Party	Candidate	Votes	%
Democratic	Carlos Menchaca	4,306	58.8
Democratic	Sara M. Gonzalez (incumbent)	3,017	41.2
Democratic	Write-ins	3	0.0
Total votes		7,326	100

General election

New York City Council elections District 38 election, November 5, 2013
Party	Candidate	Votes	%
Democratic	Carlos Menchaca	8,265	
Working Families	Carlos Menchaca	1,121	
Total	Carlos Menchaca	9,386	90.2
Conservative	Henry Lallave	1,002	9.6
n/a	Write-ins	18	0.2
Total votes		10,406	100

==== District 39 ====
Incumbent Democrat Brad Lander was unopposed in the Democratic primary.

New York City Council elections District 39 election, November 5, 2013
Party	Candidate	Votes	%
Democratic	Brad Lander	22,725	
Working Families	Brad Lander	5,270	
Total	Brad Lander (incumbent)	27,995	91.7
Conservative	James Murray	2,469	8.1
n/a	Write-ins	58	0.2
Total votes		30,522	100

==== District 40 ====
Democratic primary

New York City Council elections District 40 Democratic primary, September 10, 2013
Party	Candidate	Votes	%
Democratic	Mathieu Eugene (incumbent)	6,210	47.9
Democratic	Saundra Thomas	4,862	37.5
Democratic	Sylvia Kinard	1,359	10.5
Democratic	John Grant	538	4.1
Democratic	Write-ins	5	0.0
Total votes		12,974	100

General election

New York City Council elections District 40 election, November 5, 2013
Party	Candidate	Votes	%
Democratic	Mathieu Eugene	17,280	
Working Families	Mathieu Eugene	1,219	
Total	Mathieu Eugene (incumbent)	18,499	89.9
Rent Is Too Damn High	Sylvia Kinard	1,260	6.1
Conservative	Brian Kelly	772	3.8
n/a	Write-ins	51	0.2
Total votes		20,582	100

==== District 41 ====
Democratic primary

New York City Council elections District 41 Democratic primary, September 10, 2013
Party	Candidate	Votes	%
Democratic	Darlene Mealy (incumbent)	7,607	66.3
Democratic	Kathleen Daniel	2,284	19.9
Democratic	Stanley Kinard	1,575	13.7
Democratic	Write-ins	3	0.0
Total votes		11,469	100

General election

New York City Council elections District 41 election, November 5, 2013
Party	Candidate	Votes	%
Democratic	Darlene Mealy	17,165	
Working Families	Darlene Mealy	413	
Total	Darlene Mealy (incumbent)	17,578	97.3
Independence	Bilal Malik	474	2.6
n/a	Write-ins	12	0.1
Total votes		18,064	100

==== District 42 ====
Democratic primary

New York City Council elections District 42 Democratic primary, September 10, 2013
Party	Candidate	Votes	%
Democratic	Inez Barron	5,887	43.2
Democratic	Chris Banks	3,359	24.7
Democratic	Regina Powell	1,178	8.7
Democratic	John Whitehead	1,037	7.6
Democratic	Nikki Lucas	908	6.7
Democratic	Sean Henry	813	6.0
Democratic	Prince Lewis	431	3.2
Democratic	Rafael Espinal (Write-in)	2	0.0
Total votes		13,615	100

General election

New York City Council elections District 42 election, November 5, 2013
Party	Candidate	Votes	%
Democratic	Inez Barron	17,764	
Working Families	Inez Barron	390	
Total	Inez Barron	18,154	96.0
Conservative	Ernest Johnson	723	3.8
n/a	Write-ins	25	0.1
Total votes		18,902	100

==== District 43 ====
Incumbent Democrat Vincent J. Gentile was unopposed in the Democratic primary.

New York City Council elections District 43 election, November 5, 2013
Party	Candidate	Votes	%
Democratic	Vincent J. Gentile	12,415	
Working Families	Vincent J. Gentile	950	
Total	Vincent J. Gentile (incumbent)	13,365	62.8
Republican	John Quaglione	5,813	
Conservative	John Quaglione	1,569	
Independence	John Quaglione	179	
Total	John Quaglione	7,561	35.5
Green	Patrick Dwyer	349	1.6
n/a	Write-ins	21	0.1
Total votes		21,296	100

==== District 44 ====
Democratic primary

New York City Council elections District 44 Democratic primary, September 10, 2013
Party	Candidate	Votes	%
Democratic	David G. Greenfield (incumbent)	6,688	90.4
Democratic	Jacob Flusberg	707	9.6
Democratic	Write-ins	6	0.1
Total votes		7,401	100

General election

New York City Council elections District 44 election, November 5, 2013
Party	Candidate	Votes	%
Democratic	David G. Greenfield	11,498	
Conservative	David G. Greenfield	2,624	
Independence	David G. Greenfield	264	
Total	David G. Greenfield (incumbent)	14,386	81.5
Republican	Joseph Hayon	3,147	17.8
n/a	Write-ins	121	0.7
Total votes		17,654	100

==== District 45 ====
Democratic primary

New York City Council elections District 45 Democratic primary, September 10, 2013
Party	Candidate	Votes	%
Democratic	Jumaane Williams (incumbent)	10,332	76.5
Democratic	Jean Similien	1,674	12.4
Democratic	Godwin Williams	1,498	11.1
Democratic	Write-ins	2	0.0
Total votes		13,506	100

General election

New York City Council elections District 45 election, November 5, 2013
Party	Candidate	Votes	%
Democratic	Jumaane Williams	20,427	
Working Families	Jumaane Williams	927	
Total	Jumaane Williams (incumbent)	21,354	96.3
Rent Is Too Damn High	Erlene King	702	3.2
n/a	Write-ins	123	0.6
Total votes		22,179	100

==== District 46 ====
Democratic primary

New York City Council elections District 46 Democratic primary, September 10, 2013
Party	Candidate	Votes	%
Democratic	Alan Maisel	8,387	59.6
Democratic	Mercedes Narcisse	5,669	40.3
Democratic	Write-ins	8	0.1
Total votes		14,064	100.0

General election

New York City Council elections District 46 election, November 5, 2013
Party	Candidate	Votes	%
Democratic	Alan Maisel	19,765	
Working Families	Alan Maisel	526	
Total	Alan Maisel	20,291	80.2
Republican	Anthony Testaverde	3,792	
Conservative	Anthony Testaverde	998	
Independence	Anthony Testaverde	182	
Total	Anthony Testaverde	4,972	19.7
n/a	Write-ins	38	0.2
Total votes		25,301	100.0

==== District 47 ====
Democratic primary

New York City Council elections District 47 Democratic primary, September 10, 2013
Party	Candidate	Votes	%
Democratic	Mark Treyger	3,234	45.9
Democratic	Todd Dobrin	1,999	28.4
Democratic	John Lisyanskiy	1,810	25.7
Democratic	Write-ins	5	0.1
Total votes		7,048	100.0

General election

New York City Council elections District 47 election, November 5, 2013
Party	Candidate	Votes	%
Democratic	Mark Treyger	9,196	70.3
Republican	Andrew Sullivan	2,849	
Conservative	Andrew Sullivan	640	
Total	Andrew Sullivan	3,489	26.7
School Choice	Connis Mobley	247	1.9
Independent	Gregory Davidzon (write-in)	84	0.6
n/a	Other Write-ins	60	0.5
Total votes		13,076	100.0

==== District 48 ====
Democratic primary

New York City Council elections District 48 Democratic primary, September 10, 2013
Party	Candidate	Votes	%
Democratic	Chaim Deutsch	3,317	34.8
Democratic	Ari Kagan	2,912	30.5
Democratic	Theresa Scavo	1,735	18.2
Democratic	Igor Oberman	1,338	14.0
Democratic	Natraj Bhushan	240	2.5
Total votes		9,542	100.0

General election

New York City Council elections District 48 election, November 5, 2013
Party	Candidate	Votes	%
Democratic	Chaim Deutsch	10,169	49.6
Republican	David Storobin	6,338	
Conservative	David Storobin	976	
Independence	David Storobin	294	
Total	David Storobin	7,608	37.1
Independent	Gregory Davidzon (write-in)	1,424	6.9
Working Families	Igor Oberman	913	4.5
Forward Brooklyn	Alexander Lotovsky	147	0.7
n/a	Other Write-ins	247	1.2
Total votes		20,508	100.0

=== Staten Island ===
==== District 49 ====
Incumbent Democrat Debi Rose was unopposed in the Democratic primary.

New York City Council elections District 49 election, November 5, 2013
Party	Candidate	Votes	%
Democratic	Debi Rose	14,462	
Working Families	Debi Rose	1,099	
Total	Debi Rose (incumbent)	15,561	69.6
Republican	Mark Macron	5,515	
Conservative	Mark Macron	1,250	
Total	Mark Macron	6,765	30.3
n/a	Write-ins	28	0.1
Total votes		22,354	100.0

==== District 50 ====
Republican primary

New York City Council elections District 50 Republican primary, September 10, 2013
Party	Candidate	Votes	%
Republican	Steven Matteo	3,083	55.2
Republican	Lisa Giovinazzo	2,504	44.8
Republican	Write-ins	3	0.0
Total votes		5,590	100

Democratic primary

New York City Council elections District 50 Democratic primary, September 10, 2013
Party	Candidate	Votes	%
Democratic	John Mancuso	3,192	61.5
Democratic	Mendy Mirocznik	1,990	38.4
Democratic	Write-ins	5	0.1
Total votes		5,187	100

General election

New York City Council elections District 50 election, November 5, 2013
Party	Candidate	Votes	%
Republican	Steven Matteo	13,522	
Conservative	Steven Matteo	2,216	
Independence	Steven Matteo	557	
Total	Steven Matteo	16,295	63.5
Democratic	John Mancuso	8,611	
Working Families	John Mancuso	723	
Total	John Mancuso	9,334	36.4
n/a	Write-ins	27	0.1
Total votes		25,656	100

==== District 51 ====
Incumbent Republican Vincent M. Ignizio was unopposed in the Republican primary.

New York City Council elections District 51 election, November 5, 2013
Party	Candidate	Votes	%
Republican	Vincent M. Ignizio	15,157	
Conservative	Vincent M. Ignizio	2,434	
Independence	Vincent M. Ignizio	734	
Total	Vincent M. Ignizio (incumbent)	18,325	73.6
Democratic	Chris Walsh	6,540	26.3
n/a	Write-ins	25	0.1
Total votes		24,890	100
