= New York City's 47th City Council district =

- Boundaries following the 2020 census

Government
  - Councilmember: Kayla Santosuosso (D—Bay Ridge)

Population (2010)
  - Total: 161,814

Demographics
  - White: 57%
  - Asian: 19%
  - Hispanic: 14%
  - Black: 9%
  - Other: 2%

Registration
  - Democratic: 52.9%
  - Republican: 17.3%
  - No party preference: 27.0%
- Registered voters (2021) 92,039

New York City's 47th City Council district is one of 51 districts in the New York City Council. It has been represented by Democrat Kayla Santosuosso since 2026, succeeding fellow Democrat Justin Brannan.

== Geography ==
=== 2020s ===
District 47 covers two areas in southern Brooklyn, linked by a handful of city blocks. The district covers Bay Ridge, Coney Island, Sea Gate and Gravesend, with portions of Bensonhurst, Bath Beach, and Dyker Heights. Most of Coney Island's attractions, such as the Wonder Wheel, the New York Aquarium, and the Riegelmann Boardwalk, are located within the district, as is Calvert Vaux Park.

The district overlaps with Brooklyn Community Boards 10, 11, 13, and 15, and with New York's 8th, 10th, and 11th congressional districts. It also overlaps with the 17th, 23rd, and 26th districts of the New York State Senate, and with the 45th, 46th, 47th, 49th, 51st and 64th districts of the New York State Assembly.

=== 2010s ===
District 47 is based around Coney Island and other parts of Brooklyn's southern shoreline, including Gravesend, Sea Gate, eastern Bensonhurst, and a small section of Bath Beach. Most of Coney Island's attractions, such as the Wonder Wheel, the New York Aquarium, and the Riegelmann Boardwalk, are located within the district.

The district overlaps with Brooklyn Community Boards 11, 13, and 15, and with New York's 8th, 10th, and 11th congressional districts. It also overlaps with the 17th, 22nd, and 23rd districts of the New York State Senate, and with the 45th, 46th, 47th, 48th, and 49th districts of the New York State Assembly.

== Members representing the district ==
Members	Party	Years served	Electoral history
District established January 1, 1992
Samuel Horwitz (Coney Island)	Democratic	January 1, 1992 – December 31, 1993	Redistricted from the 33rd district and re-elected in 1991. Retired.
Howard L. Lasher (Ocean Parkway)	Democratic	January 1, 1994 – December 31, 2001	Elected in 1993. Re-elected in 1997. Termed out.
Domenic Recchia (Gravesend)	Democratic	January 1, 2002 – December 31, 2013	Elected in 2001. Re-elected in 2003. Re-elected in 2005. Re-elected in 2009. Termed out and ran for New York State Comptroller.
Mark Treyger (Coney Island)	Democratic	January 1, 2014 – December 31, 2021	Elected in 2013. Re-elected in 2017. Termed out.
Ari Kagan (Gravesend)	Democratic	January 1, 2022 – December 31, 2023	Elected in 2021. Switched parties in 2022. Lost re-election.
Ari Kagan (Gravesend)	Republican	January 1, 2022 – December 31, 2023	Elected in 2021. Switched parties in 2022. Lost re-election.
Justin Brannan (Bay Ridge)	Democratic	January 1, 2024 – December 31, 2025	Redistricted from the 43rd district and re-elected in 2023. Termed out and ran for New York City Comptroller.
Kayla Santosuosso (Bay Ridge)	Democratic	January 1, 2026 – present	Elected in 2025.

== Recent election results ==
=== 2025 ===
The results of the Republican primary election for this district were delayed due to the certified margin of victory being less than twenty votes, triggering a hand recount under New York State election law. On July 24, the New York City Board of Elections referred allegations of voter fraud to the Brooklyn District Attorney's office.

2025 New York City Council election, District 47 Republican primary
Party	Candidate	Maximum round	Maximum votes	Share in maximum round	Maximum votes First round votes Transfer votes
Republican	George Sarantopoulous	2	1,126	50.4%	
Republican	Richie Barsamian	2	1,110	49.6%	
Write-in		1	41	1.8%	

2025 New York City Council election, District 47 Democratic primary & general election
Primary election
Party	Candidate	Votes	%
Democratic	Kayla Santosuosso	10,466	79.0
Democratic	Fedir Usmanov	2,685	20.3
Write-in		91	0.7
Total votes		13,242	100.0
General election
Democratic	Kayla Santosuosso	19,610	
Working Families	Kayla Santosuosso	3,525	
Total	Kayla Santosuosso	23,135	59.3
Republican	George Sarantopoulous	14,322	
Conservative	George Sarantopoulous	1,497	
Total	George Sarantopoulous	15,819	40.5
Write-in		83	0.2
Total votes		39,037	100.0
Democratic hold			

=== 2023 (redistricting) ===
During the 2021–23 term, Ari Kagan defected to the Republican Party. In addition, due to redistricting and the 2020 changes to the New York City Charter, councilmembers elected during the 2021 and 2023 City Council elections will serve two-year terms, with full four-year terms resuming after the 2025 New York City Council elections.

2023 New York City Council election, District 47
Primary election
Party	Candidate	Votes	%
Republican	Ari Kagan (incumbent)	1,634	75.3
Republican	Anna Belfiore-Delfaus	271	12.5
Republican	Avery Pereira	255	11.8
Write-in		10	0.5
Total votes		2,170	100
General election
Democratic	Justin Brannan (incumbent)	11,517	58.0
Republican	Ari Kagan	7,216	
Conservative	Ari Kagan	1,017	
Total	Ari Kagan (incumbent)	8,233	41.5
Write-in		103	0.5
Total votes		19,853	
Democratic win (new boundaries)			

=== 2021 ===
In 2019, voters in New York City approved Ballot Question 1, which implemented ranked-choice voting in all local elections. Under the new system, voters have the option to rank up to five candidates for every local office. Voters whose first-choice candidates fare poorly will have their votes redistributed to other candidates in their ranking until one candidate surpasses the 50 percent threshold. If one candidate surpasses 50 percent in first-choice votes, then ranked-choice tabulations will not occur.

2021 New York City Council election, District 47 Democratic primary
Party	Candidate	Maximum round	Maximum votes	Share in maximum round	Maximum votes First round votes Transfer votes
Democratic	Ari Kagan	3	4,018	55.7%	
Democratic	Steven Patzer	3	3,194	44.3%	
Democratic	Joseph Packer	2	1,071	13.4%	
Democratic	Alec Brook-Krasny	2	759	9.5%	
Write-in		1	39	0.5%	

An interactive map of District 47

2021 New York City Council election, District 47 general election
Party	Candidate	Votes	%
Democratic	Ari Kagan	7,933	53.1
Republican	Mark Szuszkiewicz	6,443	
Conservative	Mark Szuszkiewicz	532	
Total	Mark Szuszkiewicz	6,975	46.7
Write-in		25	0.2
Total votes		14,933	100
Democratic hold			

=== 2017 ===
2017 New York City Council election, District 47
Party	Candidate	Votes	%
Democratic	Mark Treyger	9,103	
Working Families	Mark Treyger	808	
Total	Mark Treyger (incumbent)	9,911	72.4
Republican	Raimondo Denaro	3,205	
Conservative	Raimondo Denaro	546	
Total	Raimondo Denaro	3,751	27.4
Write-in		24	0.2
Total votes		13,686	100
Democratic hold			

=== 2013 ===
2013 New York City Council election, District 47
Primary election
Party	Candidate	Votes	%
Democratic	Mark Treyger	3,234	45.9
Democratic	Todd Dobrin	1,999	28.4
Democratic	John Lisyanskiy	1,810	25.7
Write-in		5	0.0
Total votes		7,048	100
General election
Democratic	Mark Treyger	9,196	70.3
Republican	Andrew Sullivan	2,849	
Conservative	Andrew Sullivan	640	
Total	Andrew Sullivan	3,489	26.7
School Choice	Connis Mobley	247	1.9
Write-in		144	1.1
Total votes		13,076	100
Democratic hold			
