= 2017 New York City Council election =

- November 7, 2017

All 51 seats on the New York City Council 26 seats needed for a majority
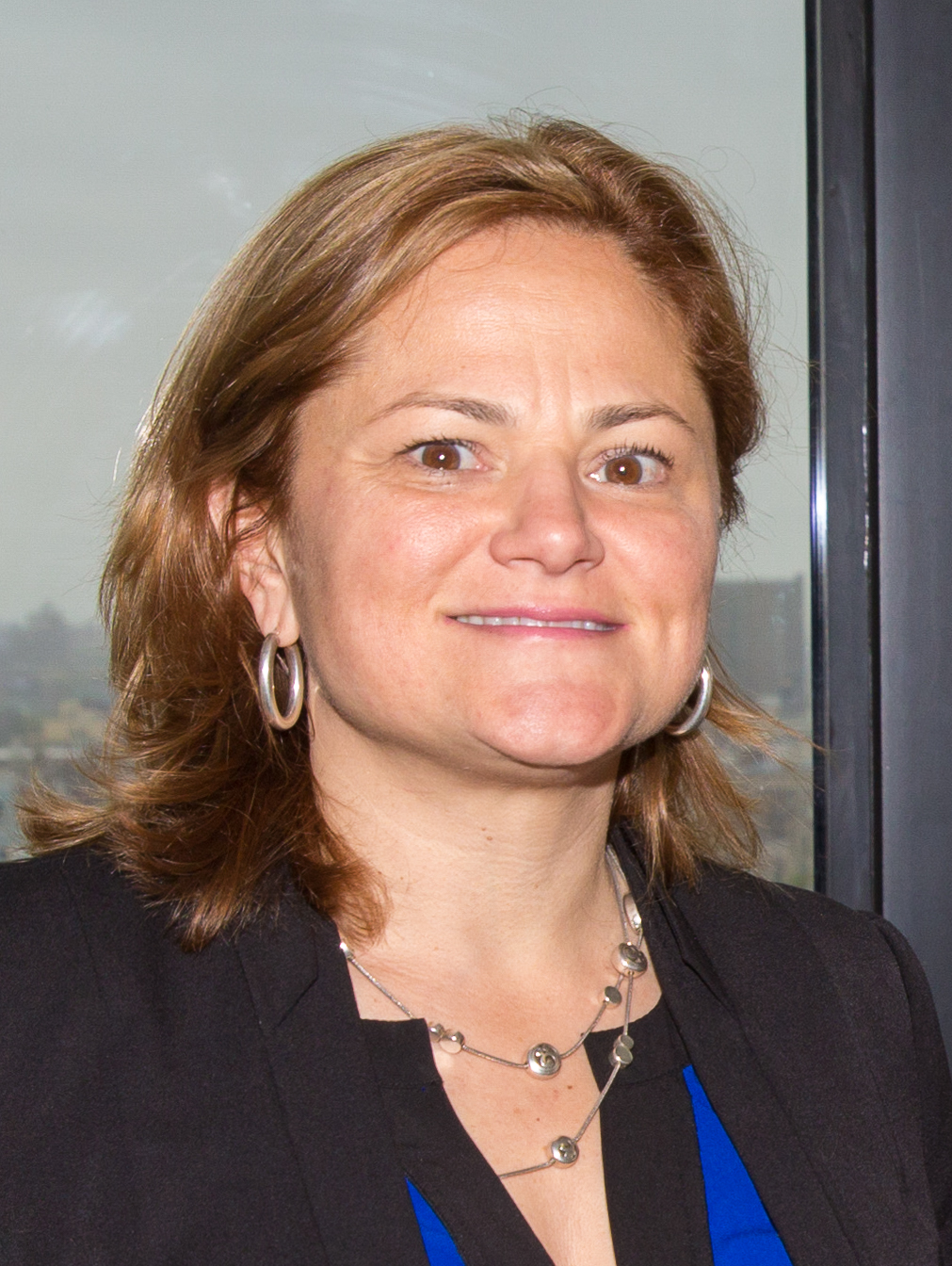

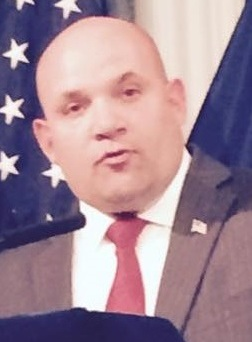
	Majority party	Minority party
Leader	Melissa Mark-Viverito (term-limited)	Steven Matteo
Party	Democratic	Republican
Leader's seat	8th-Manhattan	50th-Staten Island
Last election	48 seats, 78.99%	3 seats, 16.07%
Seats won	48 (Note: While Robert Holden won on the Republican Party line, he is still a Democrat and caucuses with the Democrats)	3
Seat change	0	0
- Results by district: Democratic: 40–50% 50–60% 60–70% 70–80% 80–90% Unopposed Republican: 50–60% 60–70% 70–80% 80–90%
Speaker before election
Melissa Mark-Viverito
Democratic
Elected Speaker
Corey Johnson
Democratic

Elections for members of the New York City Council were held on November 7, 2017. Primary elections were held on September 12 for all 51 districts of the city council.

== Incumbents not seeking re-election ==
=== Term-limited incumbents ===
1. Rosie Méndez (D), District 2
2. Daniel Garodnick (D), District 4
3. Melissa Mark-Viverito (D), District 8
4. James Vacca (D), District 13
5. Annabel Palma (D), District 18
6. Darlene Mealy (D), District 41
7. Vincent J. Gentile (D), District 43

=== Retiring incumbents ===
1. Julissa Ferreras (D), District 21
2. David G. Greenfield (D), District 44

== Results ==
=== Manhattan ===
==== District 1 ====
Democratic primary

Democratic primary
Party	Candidate	Votes	%
Democratic	Margaret Chin (incumbent)	5,363	45.8
Democratic	Christopher Marte	5,141	43.9
Democratic	Aaron Foldenauer	734	6.3
Democratic	Dashia Imperiale	459	3.9
Democratic	Write-ins	22	0.2
Total votes		11,719	100

General election

General election
Party	Candidate	Votes	%
Democratic	Margaret Chin	10,963	
Working Families	Margaret Chin	942	
Total	Margaret Chin (incumbent)	11,905	49.9
Independence	Christopher Marte	8,753	36.7
Republican	Bryan Jung	2,111	8.8
Liberal	Aaron Foldenauer	1,059	4.4
Write-in		33	0.1
Total votes		23,861	100

==== District 2 ====
Incumbent Democrat Rosie Mendez was term-limited and could not run for a third term.

Democratic primary
Party	Candidate	Votes	%
Democratic	Carlina Rivera	8,354	60.5
Democratic	Mary Silver	2,282	16.5
Democratic	Ronnie Sung Cho	1,181	8.6
Democratic	Jorge Vasquez	1,040	7.5
Democratic	Jasmin Sanchez	638	4.6
Democratic	Erin Hussein	267	1.9
Democratic	Write-ins	38	0.3
Total votes		13,800	100

General election

General election
Party	Candidate	Votes	%
Democratic	Carlina Rivera	18,047	
Working Families	Carlina Rivera	2,003	
Total	Carlina Rivera	20,050	82.7
Republican	Jimmy McMillan	2,609	
Rent Is Too Damn High	Jimmy McMillan	228	
Total	Jimmy McMillan	2,837	11.7
Liberal	Jasmin Sanchez	487	2.0
Libertarian	Don Garrity	434	1.8
Green	Manny Cavaco	375	1.5
Write-in		63	0.2
Total votes		24,246	100

==== District 3 ====
Incumbent Democrat Corey Johnson was unopposed in the Democratic primary.

General election

General election
Party	Candidate	Votes	%
Democratic	Corey Johnson	22,997	
Working Families	Corey Johnson	2,747	
Total	Corey Johnson (incumbent)	25,744	93.7
Eco Justice	Marni Halasa	1,556	5.7
Write-in		166	0.6
Total votes		27,466	100

==== District 4 ====
Incumbent Democrat Daniel Garodnick was term-limited and could not seek a third term. Democratic primary

Democratic primary
Party	Candidate	Votes	%
Democratic	Keith Powers	4,456	40.8
Democratic	Marti Speranza	2,493	22.8
Democratic	Rachel Honig	948	8.7
Democratic	Bessie R. Schachter	918	8.4
Democratic	Vanessa Aronson	746	6.8
Democratic	Maria Castro	503	4.6
Democratic	Jeffrey S. Mailman	482	4.4
Democratic	Barry Shapiro	232	2.1
Democratic	Alec Hartman	109	1.0
Democratic	Write-ins	26	0.2
Total votes		10,913	100

General election

General election
Party	Candidate	Votes	%
Democratic	Keith Powers	16,496	57.2
Republican	Rebecca Harary	8,119	
Stop de Blasio	Rebecca Harary	451	
Women's Equality	Rebecca Harary	239	
Reform	Rebecca Harary	82	
Total	Rebecca Harary	8,891	30.8
Liberal	Rachel Honig	3,422	11.9
Write-in		28	0.1
Total votes		28,837	100

==== District 5 ====
Democratic primary

Democratic primary
Party	Candidate	Votes	%
Democratic	Ben Kallos (incumbent)	7,847	74.6
Democratic	Gwen Goodwin	1,582	15.0
Democratic	Patrick A. Bobilin	1,044	9.9
Democratic	Write-ins	45	0.4
Total votes		10,518	100

General election

General election
Party	Candidate	Votes	%
Democratic	Ben Kallos	21,945	
Working Families	Ben Kallos	1,489	
Total	Ben Kallos (incumbent)	23,434	80.2
Republican	Frank Spotorno	5,679	19.4
Write-in		114	0.4
Total votes		29,227	100

==== District 6 ====
Democratic primary

Democratic primary
Party	Candidate	Votes	%
Democratic	Helen Rosenthal (incumbent)	13,529	64.9
Democratic	Mel Wymore	6,446	30.9
Democratic	Cary M. Goodman	824	3.9
Democratic	Write-ins	49	0.2
Total votes		20,848	100

General election

General election
Party	Candidate	Votes	%
Democratic	Helen Rosenthal	29,518	
Working Families	Helen Rosenthal	2,771	
Total	Helen Rosenthal (incumbent)	32,289	86.9
Republican	Hyman Drusin	3,731	10.0
Stand Up Together	William H. Raudenbush	973	2.6
Write-in		153	0.4
Total votes		37,146	100

==== District 7 ====
Democratic primary

Democratic primary
Party	Candidate	Votes	%
Democratic	Mark D. Levine (incumbent)	9,286	74.1
Democratic	Thomas Lopez-Pierre	3,179	25.3
Democratic	Write-ins	72	0.6
Total votes		12,537	100

General election

General election
Party	Candidate	Votes	%
Democratic	Mark D. Levine	20,364	
Working Families	Mark D. Levine	1,931	
Total	Mark D. Levine (incumbent)	22,295	94.8
Green	Florindo J. Troncelliti	1,148	4.8
Write-in		75	0.3
Total votes		23,518	100

==== District 9 ====
Democratic primary

Democratic primary
Party	Candidate	Votes	%
Democratic	Bill Perkins (incumbent)	7,630	49.9
Democratic	Marvin Holland	2,997	19.6
Democratic	Cordell Cleare	2,670	17.4
Democratic	Tyson Lord-Gray	1,275	8.3
Democratic	Marvin Spruill	360	2.4
Democratic	Julius Tajiddin	297	1.9
Democratic	Write-ins	71	0.5
Total votes		15,300	100

General election

General election
Party	Candidate	Votes	%
Democratic	Bill Perkins	20,759	
Working Families	Bill Perkins	1,073	
Total	Bill Perkins (incumbent)	21,832	78.2
Liberal	Tyson-Lord Gray	3,615	12.9
Harlem Matters	Dianne L. Mack	1,230	4.4
Republican	Jack Royster	687	2.5
Reform	Pierre A. Gooding	481	1.7
Write-in		83	0.3
Total votes		27,928	100

==== District 10 ====
Democratic primary

Democratic primary
Party	Candidate	Votes	%
Democratic	Ydanis Rodríguez (incumbent)	7,474	61.5
Democratic	Josue Perez	3,740	30.8
Democratic	Francesca M. Castellanos	885	7.3
Democratic	Write-ins	60	0.5
Total votes		12,159	100

General election

General election
Party	Candidate	Votes	%
Democratic	Ydanis Rodríguez	16,988	
Working Families	Ydanis Rodríguez	1,867	
Total	Ydanis Rodríguez (incumbent)	18,855	87.7
Republican	Jack Royster	2,178	10.1
Write-in		468	2.2
Total votes		21,501	100

=== Manhattan/Bronx crossover ===
==== District 8 ====
Incumbent Democrat and Council Speaker Melissa Mark-Viverito was term-limited and could not seek a 4th term. Democratic primary

Democratic primary
Party	Candidate	Votes	%
Democratic	Diana Ayala	4,012	43.5
Democratic	Robert J. Rodriguez	3,895	42.2
Democratic	Tamika Mapp	902	9.8
Democratic	Israel Martinez	393	4.3
Democratic	Write-ins	21	0.2
Total votes		9,223	100

General election

General election
Party	Candidate	Votes	%
Democratic	Diana Ayala	13,541	
Working Families	Diana Ayala	800	
Total	Diana Ayala	14,341	90.9
Republican	Daby B. Carreras	738	
Reform	Daby B. Carreras	61	
Stop de Blasio	Daby B. Carreras	31	
No Rezoning 4 Ever	Daby B. Carreras	16	
Total	Daby B. Carreras	846	5.4
Conservative	Linda Ortiz	531	3.4
Write-in		59	0.4
Total votes		15,777	100

=== The Bronx ===
==== District 11 ====
Incumbent Andrew Cohen was unopposed in the Democratic primary.

General election

General election
Party	Candidate	Votes	%
Democratic	Andrew Cohen	16,783	
Working Families	Andrew Cohen	1,477	
Total	Andrew Cohen (incumbent)	18,260	84.6
Republican	Judah David Powers	2,321	
Conservative	Judah David Powers	594	
Total	Judah David Powers	2,915	13.5
Animal Rights	Roxanne F. Delgado	337	1.6
Write-in		61	0.3
Total votes		21,573	100

==== District 12 ====
Democratic primary

Democratic primary
Party	Candidate	Votes	%
Democratic	Andy King (incumbent)	7,936	68.2
Democratic	Pamela A. Hamilton-Johnson	3,167	32.1
Democratic	Karree-Lyn R. Gordon	513	4.4
Democratic	Write-ins	23	0.2
Total votes		11,639	100

General election

General election
Party	Candidate	Votes	%
Democratic	Andy King (incumbent)	13,928	95.2
Conservative	Jack Royster	675	4.6
Write-in		28	0.2
Total votes		14,631	100

==== District 13 ====
Incumbent Democrat James Vacca was term-limited and could not seek a 4th term. Democratic primary

Democratic primary
Party	Candidate	Votes	%
Democratic	Mark Gjonaj	3,503	38.5
Democratic	Marjorie Velázquez	3,113	34.2
Democratic	John C. Doyle	1,728	19.0
Democratic	Victor R. Ortiz	481	5.3
Democratic	Egidio Sementilli	270	3.0
Democratic	Write-ins	14	0.2
Total votes		9,109	100

General election

General election
Party	Candidate	Votes	%
Democratic	Mark Gjonaj	10,602	48.6
Republican	John Cerini	6,313	
Conservative	John Cerini	1,297	
Reform	John Cerini	181	
Total	John Cerini	7,791	35.7
Working Families	Marjorie Velázquez	2,829	13.0
Liberal	John C. Doyle	442	2.0
New Bronx	Alex A. Gomez	121	0.6
Write-in		28	0.2
Total votes		21,806	100

==== District 14 ====
Democratic primary

Democratic primary
Party	Candidate	Votes	%
Democratic	Fernando Cabrera (incumbent)	3,898	55.1
Democratic	Randy D. Abreu	2,456	34.7
Democratic	Felix A. Perdomo	710	10.0
Democratic	Write-ins	16	0.2
Total votes		7,080	100

General election

General election
Party	Candidate	Votes	%
Democratic	Fernando Cabrera (incumbent)	9,826	83.7
Working Families	Randy D. Abreu	1,222	10.4
Republican	Alan H. Reed	411	
Conservative	Alan H. Reed	101	
Total	Alan H. Reed	512	4.4
Liberal	Justin Sanchez	177	3.8
Write-in		7	0.0
Total votes		11,744	100

==== District 15 ====
Incumbent Democrat Ritchie Torres was unopposed in the Democratic primary.

General election

General election
Party	Candidate	Votes	%
Democratic	Ritchie Torres	3,386	
Working Families	Ritchie Torres	178	
Total	Ritchie Torres (incumbent)	3,564	92.2
Republican	Jayson Cancel	231	
Conservative	Jayson Cancel	59	
Total	Jayson Cancel	290	7.5
Write-in		8	0.2
Total votes		3,862	100

==== District 16 ====
Incumbent Democrat Vanessa Gibson was unopposed in the Democratic primary.

General election

General election
Party	Candidate	Votes	%
Democratic	Vanessa Gibson	4,975	
Working Families	Vanessa Gibson	181	
Total	Vanessa Gibson (incumbent)	5,156	96.1
Republican	Benjamin Eggleston	158	
Conservative	Benjamin Eggleston	36	
Total	Benjamin Eggleston	194	3.6
Write-in		12	0.2
Total votes		5,362	100

==== District 17 ====
Democratic primary

Democratic primary
Party	Candidate	Votes	%
Democratic	Rafael Salamanca (incumbent)	4,840	72.2
Democratic	Helen Hines	1,835	27.4
Democratic	Write-ins	31	0.4
Total votes		6,706	100

General election

General election
Party	Candidate	Votes	%
Democratic	Rafael Salamanca	11,040	
Working Families	Rafael Salamanca	472	
Total	Rafael Salamanca (incumbent)	11,512	92.3
Republican	Patrick Delices	433	3.5
Conservative	Oswald Denis	282	2.3
Empower Society	Elvis Santana	226	1.8
Write-in		25	0.2
Total votes		12,478	100

==== District 18 ====
Incumbent Democrat Annabel Palma was term-limited and could not seek a third term. Democratic primary

Democratic primary
Party	Candidate	Votes	%
Democratic	Rubén Díaz Sr.	4,017	42.1
Democratic	Amanda Farías	1,991	20.9
Democratic	Elvin Garcia	1,397	14.6
Democratic	Michael Beltzer	1,282	13.4
Democratic	William Russell Moore	842	8.8
Democratic	Write-ins	8	0.01
Total votes		9,537	100

General election

General election
Party	Candidate	Votes	%
Democratic	Rubén Díaz Sr.	12,473	78.9
Liberal	Michael Beltzer	1,292	8.2
Conservative	Eduardo Ramirez	843	5.3
Reform	William Russell Moore	685	4.3
Green	Carl Lundgren	466	2.9
Write-in		45	0.2
Total votes		15,804	100

=== Bronx/Queens crossover ===
==== District 22 ====
Incumbent Democrat Costa Constantinides was unopposed in the Democratic primary.

General election

General election
Party	Candidate	Votes	%
Democratic	Costa Constantinides	15,164	
Working Families	Costa Constantinides	2,251	
Total	Costa Constantinides (incumbent)	17,415	92.9
Dive In	Kathleen Springer	1,223	6.5
Write-in		98	0.5
Total votes		18,736	100

=== Queens ===
==== District 19 ====
Democratic primary

Democratic primary
Party	Candidate	Votes	%
Democratic	Paul Vallone (incumbent)	3,192	55.1
Democratic	Paul Graziano	2,596	44.8
Democratic	Write-ins	10	0.2
Total votes		5,798	100

General election

General election
Party	Candidate	Votes	%
Democratic	Paul Vallone	13,779	
Working Families	Paul Vallone	1,210	
Total	Paul Vallone (incumbent)	14,989	57.8
Republican	Konstantinos Poulidis	6,347	24.5
Reform	Paul Graziano	4,555	17.6
Write-in		20	0.01
Total votes		25,911	100

==== District 20 ====
Democratic primary

Democratic primary
Party	Candidate	Votes	%
Democratic	Peter Koo (incumbent)	3,822	58.2
Democratic	Alison Tan	2,719	41.4
Democratic	Write-ins	28	0.4
Total votes		6,569	100

General election

General election
Party	Candidate	Votes	%
Democratic	Peter Koo (incumbent)	9,065	97.8
Write-in		203	2.2
Total votes		9,268	100

==== District 21 ====
Incumbent Democrat Julissa Ferreras declined to seek a third term. Democratic primary

Democratic primary
Party	Candidate	Votes	%
Democratic	Francisco Moya	3,654	55.1
Democratic	Hiram Monserrate	2,937	44.3
Democratic	Write-ins	44	0.7
Total votes		6,635	100

General election

General election
Party	Candidate	Votes	%
Democratic	Francisco Moya	7,828	
Working Families	Francisco Moya	468	
Total	Francisco Moya	8,296	98.9
Write-in		91	1.1
Total votes		8,387	100

==== District 23 ====
Democratic primary

Democratic primary
Party	Candidate	Votes	%
Democratic	Barry Grodenchik (incumbent)	4,639	79.2
Democratic	Benny Itteera	1,183	20.2
Democratic	Write-ins	33	0.5
Total votes		5,855	100

General election

General election
Party	Candidate	Votes	%
Democratic	Barry Grodenchik	14,832	
Working Families	Barry Grodenchik	851	
Total	Barry Grodenchik (incumbent)	15,683	64.8
Republican	Joseph Concannon	6,494	
Conservative	Joseph Concannon	1,349	
Stop De Blasio	Joseph Concannon	208	
Total	Joseph Concannon	8,051	33.2
John Y. Lim	John Lim	462	1.9
Write-in		20	0.01
Total votes		24,216	100

==== District 24 ====
Democratic primary

Democratic primary
Party	Candidate	Votes	%
Democratic	Rory Lancman (incumbent)	3,906	62.6
Democratic	Mohammad Rahman	2,299	36.8
Democratic	Write-ins	35	0.5
Total votes		6,240	100

General election

General election
Party	Candidate	Votes	%
Democratic	Rory Lancman	12,455	
Working Families	Rory Lancman	1,165	
Total	Rory Lancman (incumbent)	13,620	88.4
Reform	Mohammad Rahman	1,701	11.0
Write-in		87	0.6
Total votes		15,408	100

==== District 25 ====
Incumbent Democrat Daniel Dromm was unopposed in the Democratic primary.

General election

General election
Party	Candidate	Votes	%
Democratic	Daniel Dromm	10,736	
Working Families	Daniel Dromm	1,460	
Total	Daniel Dromm (incumbent)	12,196	98.8
Write-in		147	1.2
Total votes		12,343	100

==== District 26 ====
Incumbent Democrat Jimmy Van Bramer was unopposed in the Democratic primary.

General election

General election
Party	Candidate	Votes	%
Democratic	Jimmy Van Bramer	15,285	
Working Families	Jimmy Van Bramer	1,816	
Total	Jimmy Van Bramer (incumbent)	17,101	85.0
Republican	Marvin Jeffcoat	2,477	
Conservative	Marvin Jeffcoat	461	
Total	Marvin Jeffcoat	2,938	14.6
Write-in		69	0.3
Total votes		20,108	100

==== District 27 ====
Democratic primary

Democratic primary
Party	Candidate	Votes	%
Democratic	Daneek Miller (incumbent)	8,119	77.9
Democratic	Benny Itteera	2,237	21.5
Democratic	Write-ins	67	0.6
Total votes		10,423	100

General election

General election
Party	Candidate	Votes	%
Democratic	Daneek Miller (incumbent)	23,488	94.8
Republican	Rupert Green	799	3.2
Green	Frank Francois	446	1.8
Write-in		31	0.1
Total votes		24,764	100

==== District 28 ====
Incumbent Democrat Ruben Wills was expelled from office August 10. The winner of the general election was sworn in early to complete Wills' term. Democratic primary

Democratic primary
Party	Candidate	Votes	%
Democratic	Adrienne Adams	3,499	39.2
Democratic	Richard David	2,822	31.6
Democratic	Hettie Powell	2,589	29.0
Democratic	Write-ins	23	0.2
Total votes		8,933	100

General election

General election
Party	Candidate	Votes	%
Democratic	Adrienne Adams	14,767	86.1
Working Families	Hettie Powell	1,434	8.4
Republican	Ivan Mossop Jr.	919	5.4
Write-in		31	0.2
Total votes		17,151	100

==== District 29 ====
Incumbent Democrat Karen Koslowitz was unopposed in the Democratic primary.

General election

General election
Party	Candidate	Votes	%
Democratic	Karen Koslowitz (incumbent)	15,863	97.6
Write-in		383	2.4
Total votes		16,246	100

==== District 30 ====
Democratic primary

Democratic primary
Party	Candidate	Votes	%
Democratic	Elizabeth Crowley (incumbent)	3,621	63.7
Democratic	Robert Holden	2,050	36.0
Democratic	Write-ins	16	0.3
Total votes		5,687	100

General election

General election
Party	Candidate	Votes	%
Republican	Robert Holden	8,720	
Conservative	Robert Holden	1,507	
Reform	Robert Holden	189	
Dump De Blasio	Robert Holden	147	
Total	Robert Holden	10,563	50.2
Democratic	Elizabeth Crowley	9,351	
Working Families	Elizabeth Crowley	911	
Women's Equality	Elizabeth Crowley	164	
Total	Elizabeth Crowley (incumbent)	10,426	49.6
Write-in		34	0.2
Total votes		21,023	100
Republican gain from Democratic			

Holden, though elected on the Republican ballot line, is a registered Democrat and said that he still considered himself a Democrat."

==== District 31 ====
Incumbent Democrat Donovan Richards was unopposed in the Democratic primary.

General election

General election
Party	Candidate	Votes	%
Democratic	Donovan Richards	19,396	
Working Families	Donovan Richards	807	
Total	Donovan Richards (incumbent)	20,203	98.8
Write-in		236	1.2
Total votes		20,439	100

==== District 32 ====
Democratic primary

Democratic primary
Party	Candidate	Votes	%
Democratic	Michael Scala	2,319	43.6
Democratic	Helal Sheikh	1,587	29.9
Democratic	William Ruiz	1,329	25.0
Democratic	Write-ins	78	1.5
Total votes		5,313	100

General election

General election
Party	Candidate	Votes	%
Republican	Eric Ulrich	12,607	
Conservative	Eric Ulrich	2,037	
Independence	Eric Ulrich	624	
Reform	Eric Ulrich	162	
Total	Eric Ulrich (incumbent)	15,430	65.6
Democratic	Michael Scala	8,037	34.2
Write-in		40	0.2
Total votes		23,507	100

=== Queens/Brooklyn crossover ===
==== District 34 ====
Democratic primary

Democratic primary
Party	Candidate	Votes	%
Democratic	Antonio Reynoso (incumbent)	6,710	63.9
Democratic	Tommy Torres	3,765	35.9
Democratic	Write-ins	22	0.2
Total votes		10,497	100

General election

General election
Party	Candidate	Votes	%
Democratic	Antonio Reynoso	14,358	
Working Families	Antonio Reynoso	2,210	
Total	Antonio Reynoso (incumbent)	16,568	99.1
Write-in		143	0.9
Total votes		16,711	100

=== Brooklyn ===
==== District 33 ====
Incumbent Democrat Stephen Levin was unopposed in the Democratic primary.

General election

General election
Party	Candidate	Votes	%
Democratic	Stephen Levin (incumbent)	19,190	88.2
Progress for All	Victoria Cambranes	2,451	11.2
Write-in		112	0.5
Total votes		21,753	100

==== District 35 ====
Democratic primary

Democratic primary
Party	Candidate	Votes	%
Democratic	Laurie Cumbo (incumbent)	10,421	57.4
Democratic	Ede Fox	7,549	41.6
Democratic	Write-ins	176	1.0
Total votes		18,146	100

Green primary

Green primary
Party	Candidate	Votes	%
Green	Jabari Brisport	32	88.9
Green	Scott Hutchins	4	11.1
Total votes		36	100

General election

General election
Party	Candidate	Votes	%
Democratic	Laurie Cumbo (incumbent)	21,695	67.2
Green	Jabari Brisport	8,117	
Socialist	Jabari Brisport	1,190	
Total	Jabari Brisport	9,307	28.8
Republican	Christine Parker	1,203	3.7
Write-in		61	0.2
Total votes		32,266	100

==== District 36 ====
Incumbent Democrat Robert Cornegy was unopposed in the Democratic primary.

General election

General election
Party	Candidate	Votes	%
Democratic	Robert Cornegy (incumbent)	21,300	99.1
Write-in		197	0.9
Total votes		21,497	100

==== District 37 ====
Incumbent Democrat Rafael Espinal was unopposed in the Democratic primary.

General election

General election
Party	Candidate	Votes	%
Democratic	Rafael Espinal (incumbent)	10,369	89.8
Green	Persephone Sarah Jane Smith	1,152	10.0
Write-in		20	0.2
Total votes		11,541	100

==== District 38 ====
Democratic primary

Democratic primary
Party	Candidate	Votes	%
Democratic	Carlos Menchaca (incumbent)	4,176	48.5
Democratic	Felix Ortiz	2,828	32.8
Democratic	Chris Miao	775	9.0
Democratic	Sarah Gonzalez	524	6.1
Democratic	Delvis Valdes	292	3.4
Democratic	Write-ins	20	0.2
Total votes		8,615	100

General election

General election
Party	Candidate	Votes	%
Democratic	Carlos Menchaca	8,541	
Working Families	Carlos Menchaca	1,294	
Total	Carlos Menchaca (incumbent)	9,835	82.3
Conservative	Allan Romaguera	839	7.0
Green	Carmen Hulbert	782	6.5
Reform	Delvis Valeds	460	3.8
Write-in		39	0.3
Total votes		11,955	100

==== District 39 ====
Incumbent Democrat Brad Lander was unopposed in the Democratic primary.

General election

General election
Party	Candidate	Votes	%
Democratic	Brad Lander	24,806	
Working Families	Brad Lander	6,749	
Total	Brad Lander (incumbent)	31,555	98.5
Write-in		485	1.5
Total votes		32,040	100

==== District 40 ====
Democratic primary

Democratic primary
Party	Candidate	Votes	%
Democratic	Mathieu Eugene (incumbent)	5,560	40.8
Democratic	Brian Cunningham	4,103	30.1
Democratic	Pia Raymond	3,064	22.4
Democratic	Jennifer Berkley	877	6.4
Democratic	Write-ins	20	0.1
Total votes		13,624	100

General election

General election
Party	Candidate	Votes	%
Democratic	Mathieu Eugene (incumbent)	14,609	60.5
Reform	Brian Cunningham	8,701	36.0
Conservative	Brian Kelly	806	3.3
Write-in		45	0.2
Total votes		24,161	100

==== District 41 ====
Incumbent Democrat Darlene Mealy was term-limited and could not seek a 4th term. Democratic primary

Democratic primary
Party	Candidate	Votes	%
Democratic	Alicka Ampry-Samuel	3,385	31.2
Democratic	Henry Butler	2,389	22.0
Democratic	Cory Provost	1,214	11.1
Democratic	Moreen King	922	8.5
Democratic	Deidre Olivera	879	8.1
Democratic	Royston Antoine	620	5.7
Democratic	Victor Jordan	572	5.3
Democratic	David Miller	527	4.9
Democratic	Leopold Cox	313	2.9
Democratic	Write-ins	17	0.2
Total votes		10,838	100

General election

General election
Party	Candidate	Votes	%
Democratic	Alicka Ampry-Samuel	17,520	
Working Families	Alicka Ampry-Samuel	683	
Total	Alicka Ampry-Samuel	18,203	95.5
Republican	Berneda Jackson	469	
Conservative	Berneda Jackson	138	
Total	Berneda Jackson	607	3.2
Solutions	Brian-Christopher Cunningham	227	1.2
Write-in		25	0.1
Total votes		19,062	100

==== District 42 ====
Democratic primary

Democratic primary
Party	Candidate	Votes	%
Democratic	Inez Barron (incumbent)	7,475	83.5
Democratic	Mawuli Hormeku	1,450	16.2
Democratic	Write-ins	27	0.3
Total votes		8,952	100

General election

General election
Party	Candidate	Votes	%
Democratic	Inez Barron (incumbent)	18,341	92.5
Conservative	Ernest Johnson	893	4.5
Reform	Mawuli Hormeku	556	2.8
Write-in		28	0.1
Total votes		19,818	100

==== District 43 ====
Incumbent Democrat Vincent Gentile was term-limited and could not seek a 4th term. Democratic primary

Democratic primary
Party	Candidate	Votes	%
Democratic	Justin Brannan	3,670	38.7
Democratic	Khader El-Yateem	2,932	30.9
Democratic	Nancy Tong	1,504	15.8
Democratic	Vincent Chirico	761	7.9
Democratic	Kevin Carroll	604	6.3
Democratic	Write-ins	22	0.2
Total votes		9,493	100

Republican primary

Republican primary
Party	Candidate	Votes	%
Republican	John Quaglione	1,865	47.0
Republican	Liam McCabe	1,318	33.2
Republican	Bob Capano	579	14.6
Republican	Lucretia Regina-Potter	182	4.6
Republican	Write-ins	23	0.6
Total votes		3,967	100

General election

General election
Party	Candidate	Votes	%
Democratic	Justin Brannan	11,812	
Working Families	Justin Brannan	1,082	
Total	Justin Brannan	12,894	50.2
Republican	John Quaglione	10,127	
Conservative	John Quaglione	1,720	
Independence	John Quaglione	253	
Total	John Quaglione	12,100	47.1
Reform	Bob Capano	344	1.3
Women's Equality	Angel Medina	281	1.1
Write-in		49	0.2
Total votes		25,668	100

==== District 44 ====
Incumbent Democrat David G. Greenfield declined to seek another term.

General election

General election
Party	Candidate	Votes	%
Democratic	Kalman Yeger	8,277	
Conservative	Kalman Yeger	3,057	
Total	Kalman Yeger	11,334	66.9
Our Neighborhood	Yoni Hikind	4,854	28.6
School Choice	Harold Tischler	670	4.0
Write-in		93	0.5
Total votes		16,951	100

==== District 45 ====
Democratic primary

Democratic primary
Party	Candidate	Votes	%
Democratic	Jumaane Williams (incumbent)	9,008	90.0
Democratic	Lou Cespedes	948	9.5
Democratic	Write-ins	54	0.5
Total votes		10,010	100

General election

General election
Party	Candidate	Votes	%
Democratic	Jumaane Williams	19,963	
Working Families	Jumaane Williams	1,116	
Total	Jumaane Williams (incumbent)	21,079	96.5
True Freedom	Anthony Beckford	644	2.9
Write-in		112	0.5
Total votes		21,835	100

==== District 46 ====
Incumbent Democrat Alan Maisel was unopposed in the Democratic primary.

General election

General election
Party	Candidate	Votes	%
Democratic	Alan Maisel (incumbent)	21,457	84.2
Conservative	Jeffery Ferretti	3,997	15.7
Write-in		44	0.2
Total votes		25,498	100

==== District 47 ====
Incumbent Democrat Mark Treyger was unopposed in the Democratic primary.

General election

General election
Party	Candidate	Votes	%
Democratic	Mark Treyger	9,103	
Working Families	Mark Treyger	808	
Total	Mark Treyger (incumbent)	9,911	72.4
Republican	Raimondo Denaro	3,205	
Conservative	Raimondo Denaro	546	
Total	Raimondo Denaro	3,751	27.4
Write-in		24	0.2
Total votes		13,686	100

==== District 48 ====
Democratic primary

Democratic primary
Party	Candidate	Votes	%
Democratic	Chaim Deutsch (incumbent)	3,759	80.8
Democratic	Marat Filler	870	18.7
Democratic	Write-ins	21	0.5
Total votes		4,650	100

General election

General election
Party	Candidate	Votes	%
Democratic	Chaim Deutsch (incumbent)	10,461	61.2
Republican	Steven Saperstein	5,519	
Conservative	Steven Saperstein	751	
Reform	Steven Saperstein	239	
Total	Steven Saperstein	6,509	38.1
Write-in		49	0.2
Total votes		17,106	100

=== Staten Island ===
==== District 49 ====
Democratic primary

Democratic primary
Party	Candidate	Votes	%
Democratic	Debi Rose (incumbent)	5,895	69.4
Democratic	Kamillah Hanks	2,558	30.1
Democratic	Write-ins	43	0.5
Total votes		8,496	100

General election

General election
Party	Candidate	Votes	%
Democratic	Debi Rose	14,714	
Working Families	Debi Rose	1,038	
Total	Debi Rose (incumbent)	15,752	59.2
Republican	Michael Penrose	7,726	
Conservative	Michael Penrose	1,717	
Total	Michael Penrose	9,443	35.5
Reform	Kamillah Hanks	1,377	5.2
Write-in		40	0.2
Total votes		26,612	100

==== District 50 ====
Incumbent Republican Steven Matteo was unopposed in the Republican primary.

General election

General election
Party	Candidate	Votes	%
Republican	Steven Matteo	8,976	
Conservative	Steven Matteo	1,483	
Independence	Steven Matteo	344	
Reform	Steven Matteo	89	
Total	Steven Matteo (incumbent)	10,892	78.3
Democratic	Richard Florentino	2,995	21.5
Write-in		29	0.2
Total votes		13,916	100

==== District 51 ====
Incumbent Republican Joseph Borelli was unopposed in the Republican primary.

General election

General election
Party	Candidate	Votes	%
Republican	Joseph Borelli	25,184	
Conservative	Joseph Borelli	3,690	
Independence	Joseph Borelli	498	
Reform	Joseph Borelli	154	
Total	Joseph Borelli (incumbent)	29,526	80.1
Democratic	Dylan Schwartz	6,692	
Working Families	Dylan Schwartz	579	
Total	Dylan Schwartz	7,271	19.7
Write-in		77	0.2
Total votes		36,874	100
