= Domenic Recchia =

American lawyer

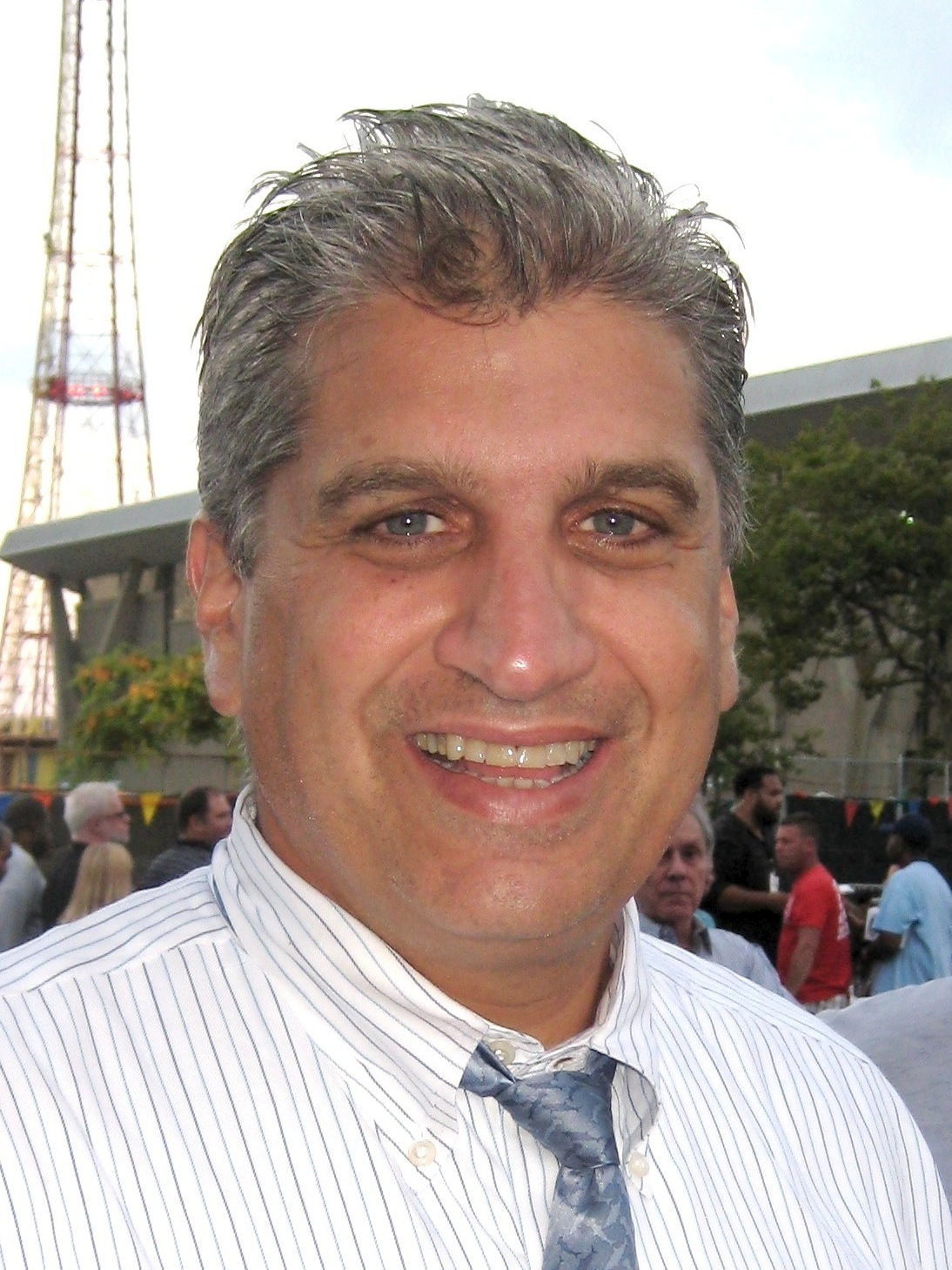
- Recchia in 2011

Member of the New York City Council from the 47th district
- In office January 1, 2002 – December 31, 2013
- Preceded by: Howard Lasher
- Succeeded by: Mark Treyger
- Constituency: Bensonhurst, Brighton Beach, Coney Island, and Gravesend

Personal details
- Born: Domenic Michael Recchia, Jr. July 25, 1959 (age 67) Brooklyn, New York, U.S.
- Party: Democratic
- Spouse: Kim Recchia
- Education: Kent State University (BA); Atlanta Law School (JD)
- Occupation: Attorney, Politician
- Website: Campaign website

Domenic Michael Recchia Jr. (born July 25, 1959) is an American attorney and politician from New York City. A member of the Democratic Party, Recchia formerly represented the 47th district of the New York City Council, which included areas of Bensonhurst, Brighton Beach, Coney Island, and Gravesend in south Brooklyn.

He received the 2014 Democratic nomination in New York's 11th congressional district, but lost in the general election.

== Early life, education, and career ==
Recchia is a lifelong resident of Gravesend. Throughout his childhood, Recchia attended local public schools including P.S. 215, David A. Boody Intermediate School, and John Dewey High School. He earned a Bachelor of Arts degree in Criminal Justice from Kent State University and a few years later, his Juris Doctor from Atlanta Law School.

After graduation, Recchia returned to Brooklyn, and in 1989 was elected to Brooklyn Community Board 13. In that same year, Recchia was elected to Community School Board 21, where he served until 2001.

== City Council ==
=== Elections ===
Then-Councilman Howard Lasher was term-limited and thus could not seek another term in the City Council. In the primary elections, Recchia faced Lasher's wife, Susan Lasher, in which she received 2,999 votes to Recchia's 4,509. He went on to win the general election with 52% of the vote. Recchia subsequently won re-election in 2003, 2005, and 2009. Term-limited from the city council, Recchia announced but later abandoned a 2012 campaign for New York Comptroller.

=== Tenure ===
Recchia previously served as Chair of the Cultural Affairs Committee.

In August 2013, Recchia voted against an override of Mayor Bloomberg's vetoes on two bills that would create an independent inspector general to oversee the New York Police Department and another that would allow people to sue in state court if they believe they've been profiled by police. Both bills were passed by the City Council with an overwhelming majority, enough to override the Mayor's vetoes.

=== Committee assignments ===
- Civil Service & Labor
- Cultural Affairs, Libraries & International Intergroup Relations
- Finance (Chair)
- Governmental Operations

== 2014 congressional election ==
After much speculation, Recchia announced he would run for New York's 11th congressional district in the 2014 election. If elected, he would have been the first congressman from the Staten Island-based district since 1906 not to have a Staten Island address. He already represented much of the Brooklyn portion of the congressional district, including Bensonhurst and Gravesend.

Recchia faced two-term Republican incumbent Michael Grimm in the general election. Roll Call named the race one of the top five to watch in the Northeast. In the lead up to the November election, Recchia did not appear at two of the scheduled candidate debates. In October 2014, the New York Times wrote that "Recchia’s recent discussions of foreign affairs have induced Democratic cringes." In a highly cited editorial, the New York Daily News called Recchia "a candidate so dumb, ill-informed, evasive and inarticulate that voting for a thuggish Republican who could wind up in a prison jumpsuit starts to make rational sense".

== Personal life ==
Recchia currently resides in Gravesend with his wife Kimberly. They have three daughters and a dog. He is a practicing attorney and was a member of the Council For Unity, a group that seeks to foster positive relations between New Yorkers of different races and religious backgrounds. He has had several liens levied against him, including one in 2010 for property he co-owns with his wife.

Political offices
Preceded by Howard Lasher	New York City Council, 47th district 2002 – 2013	Succeeded by Mark Treyger
