= Howard L. Lasher =

American politician

Member of the New York City Council from the 47th district
- In office January 1, 1994 – December 31, 2001
- Succeeded by: Domenic Recchia

Member of the New York State Assembly from the 46th district
- In office January 3, 1973 – December 31, 1993
- Preceded by: Leonard M. Simon
- Succeeded by: Jules Polonetsky

Personal details
- Born: Howard Louis Lasher; May 7, 1944 Brooklyn, New York, U.S.
- Died: March 11, 2007 (aged 62) Ocean Parkway, New York, U.S.
- Party: Democratic
- Spouse(s): Geri Lasher(first wife), Susan Lasher (second wife)
- Children: 5 (Lisa, Laurie, David, and stepchildren Marissa and Jared)
- Occupation: Politician

Howard L. Lasher (1944–2007) was an American Democratic Party politician from Brooklyn. He was the first Orthodox Jew elected to state office in New York. He was the first to ever wear a Kippah in the New York assembly.

== Political career ==
Lasher was a well-known politician in Brooklyn, New York, for over thirty-five years. He was a member of the New York State Assembly from 1973 to 1993, sitting in the 180th, 181st, 182nd, 183rd, 184th, 185th, 186th, 187th, 188th, 189th and 190th New York State Legislatures. He was a member of the New York City Council from 1994 to 2001. He had represented Brooklyn's 47th District on the City Council, representing Coney Island, Brighton Beach and the surrounding communities.

== New York Deprogramming Bill ==
Lasher was the principal author of the "New York Deprogramming Bill, which would have allowed courts to appoint temporary guardians to remove people forcibly from cults. The New York State Assembly passed the bill 77-64, as did the New York State Senate 35-23. However, it was vetoed in July 1981 by New York Governor Hugh Carey.

== Council member ==
While a Council Member, Lasher funded the reconstruction of Brighton Playground, in 1995. As an Assemblyman, Lasher served as Chairman of New York State Governor Mario Cuomo's Insurance Committee.

In November 2000, Lasher helped fund a $2 million reconstruction of the playground area of Calvert Vaux Park, a 73-acre (300,000 m^{2}) park in New York City; named for Calvert Vaux, the designer of Central Park.

== Later years ==
Lasher did not run in the 2001 Brooklyn City Council elections due to term limits. His wife, Susan Lasher, ran and lost to Domenic Recchia, receiving 2,999 votes to his 4,509.

Howard Lasher died in his Ocean Parkway, New York home, on March 11, 2007.

== Education ==
- Brooklyn Law School
- Brooklyn College
- Yeshiva University High School for Boys

New York State Assembly
Preceded by Leonard M. Simon	New York State Assembly; 46th District; 1973–1993	Succeeded by Jules Polonetsky
New York City Council
Preceded by Samuel Horwitz	New York City Council; 47th District; 1994–2001	Succeeded by Domenic Recchia
