= Ari Kagan =

American politician from New York City (born 1967)

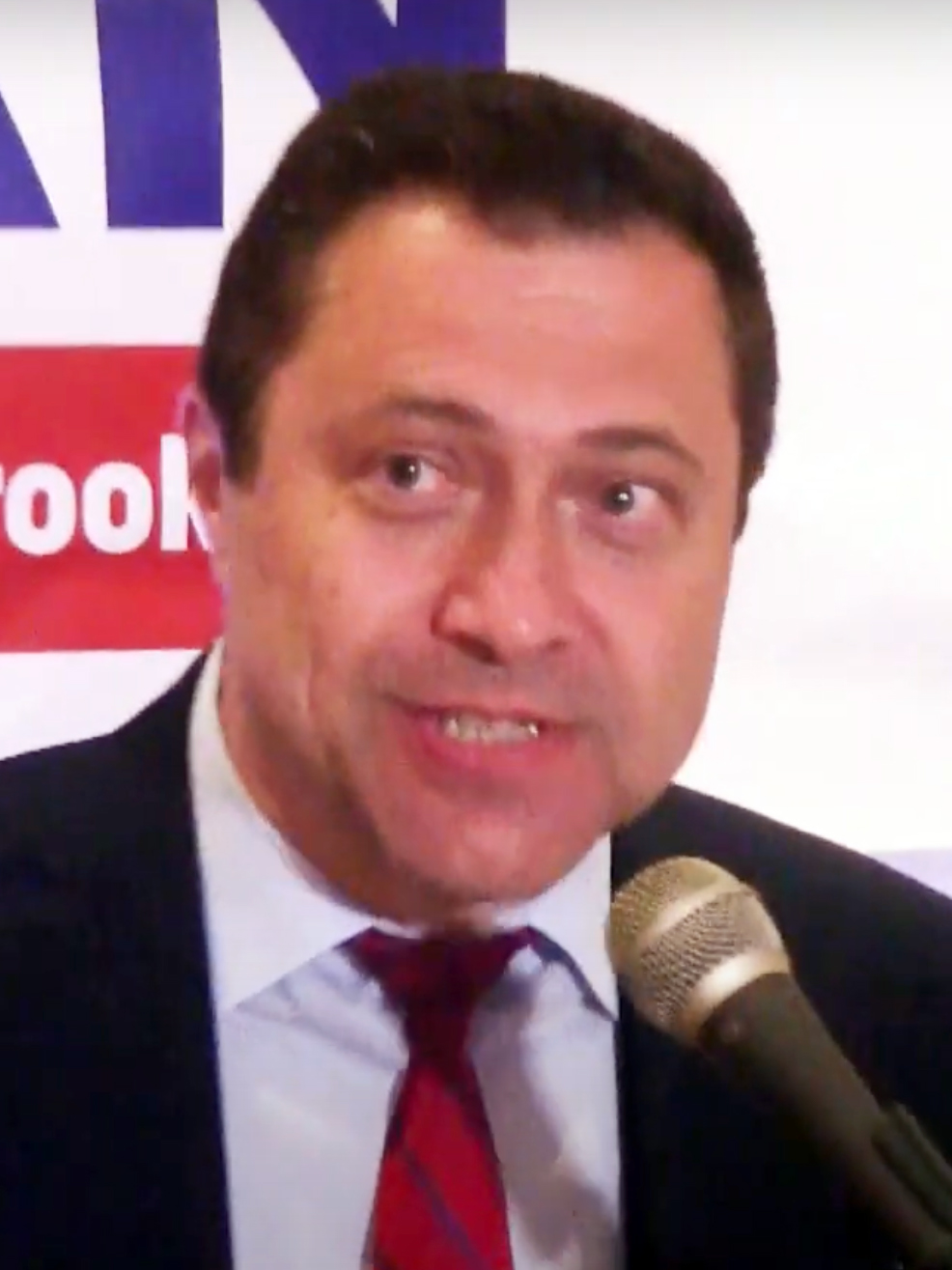
- Kagan in 2023

Member of the New York City Council from the 47th district
- In office January 1, 2022 – December 31, 2023
- Preceded by: Mark Treyger
- Succeeded by: Justin Brannan

Personal details
- Born: Arkadiy Kagan; January 29, 1967 (age 59) Minsk, Soviet Union (now Belarus)
- Party: Republican (2022–present)
- Other political affiliations: Soviet Communist Party (before 1991); Democratic (2002–2022)
- Education: Lviv Higher Military-Political School, Journalism Department; Baruch College (BBA)

Military service
- Allegiance: Soviet Union
- Branch/service: Soviet Army
- Years of service: 1984–1991

Ari Kagan (born Arkadiy Kagan; 1967) is an American politician who was a member of the New York City Council from the 47th district, representing Bensonhurst, Coney Island, Gravesend, and Sea Gate. Elected in November 2021, he assumed office on January 1, 2022. After being elected as a Democrat, he switched his party membership to the Republican Party during his City Council term. Kagan lost his re-election bid to Democrat Justin Brannan in 2023.

== Early life and education ==
Kagan was born in Minsk in 1967. His parents were survivors of the Holocaust. His paternal grandmother Sofiya was killed in the Minsk ghetto in 1942 while his father Mikhail survived.

After graduating Secondary School No. 20 in Minsk, he attended the Leningrad Suvorov School until the Spring of 1984 after which he joined the Soviet Army and in the Fall of 1984, he was admitted to the Journalism Department at Lviv Higher Military-Political School, from which he graduated in Spring 1988.

In 1991, Kagan left the Soviet Army and the Soviet Communist Party. He said he "became disillusioned with the Soviet-Communist ideology". He immigrated as a refugee to the United States with his family in May 1993, after the collapse of the Soviet Union. In the U.S., he attended Zicklin School of Business at Baruch College and graduated with a Bachelor of Business Administration in Marketing and Advertising in 1999.

In 2002, he legally changed his name from "Arkadiy" to "Ari" when he became naturalized as a U.S. citizen. In a 2010 interview, Kagan said of the name change: "Firstly, Ari is shorter than Arkadiy, and Americans do not distort my name, and secondly, I like my new name because it resembles the abbreviation of the words "America - Russia - Israel"."

== Career ==
=== Journalism ===
As a military journalist, Kagan worked in Soviet Latvia with the newspapers Sovetskiy Tankist in Dobele and Dlya Rodiny! in Riga. Kagan said that he was "lucky to work in various papers during the Gorbachev era of Glasnost and Perestroika when criticism of authorities was allowed and sometimes even encouraged". He told TabletMag that "I was not a dissident. But I was honest with myself, with my family, with my readers." After resigning from the Soviet Army in 1991, Kagan worked for two anti-Communist papers: "Independent Baltic Newspaper" (Riga) and "Byelorussian Enterprener" (Minsk).

In Brooklyn, Kagan worked as a writer for the Russian-language newspapers Yevreiski Mir and Vecherniy New York. He also presented a weekly television program on the Brooklyn-based Russian Television Network of America (RTN). From 2005 to 2021, Kagan hosted the morning Radio Show "New York City News" on Russian language Davidzon Radio (620 AM).

=== Democratic Party politics ===
In 2012, Kagan was elected as a Democratic District Leader in the 45th New York State Assembly District. He founded the political club Bay Democrats in 2014. In December 2022, Kagan became a Republican and stepped down from his District Leader post.

=== Work for elected officials ===
Kagan worked as a community liaison for Comptrollers John Liu and Scott Stringer, as an assistant to the United States Congressman Michael McMahon and later as Director of District Operations to Council Member Mark Treyger.

=== New York City Council ===
In November 2021, Kagan was elected to the New York City Council as a Democrat, succeeding Mark Treyger.

In December 2022, Kagan switched his party affiliation to Republican, citing disagreements with Democrats on crime and education. He joined the City Council's Republican conference.

Council Speaker Adrienne Adams suggested that Kagan might lose his position as Chair of the Council's Committee on Resiliency and Waterfronts. "Voters sent Council member Kagan to the Council as a member of the majority conference and this drastic about-face seriously calls into question his commitment to the policy priorities of our conference that will impact his committee roles, particularly his chairmanship given the fact that he is joining a party that denies climate change," Adams said. Kagan resigned from the Committee Chairmanship shortly thereafter, telling the Daily News that he "resigned rather than to wait until being expelled by the Council leadership".

Kagan announced that he would run for re-election in the newly re-drawn 47th district. The new map of the 47th district was criticized, as it connected Bay Ridge to Coney Island through a one-block stretch and divided a Coney Island housing complex (Warbasse Houses) between two districts.

In his 2023 re-election bid, Kagan won the Republican primary. He lost to Democrat Justin Brannan in the general election.

== See also ==
- List of American politicians who switched parties in office

In 2024, Kagan worked as Assistant to the Republican Minority Leader of NYC Council Joe Borelli.

In January 2025, Kagan began working as Senior Advisor to the Brooklyn Republican State Senator Steve Chan. In December of 2025, he founded a new political club called the Community First Republican Club.
