= Justin Brannan =

American politician and musician

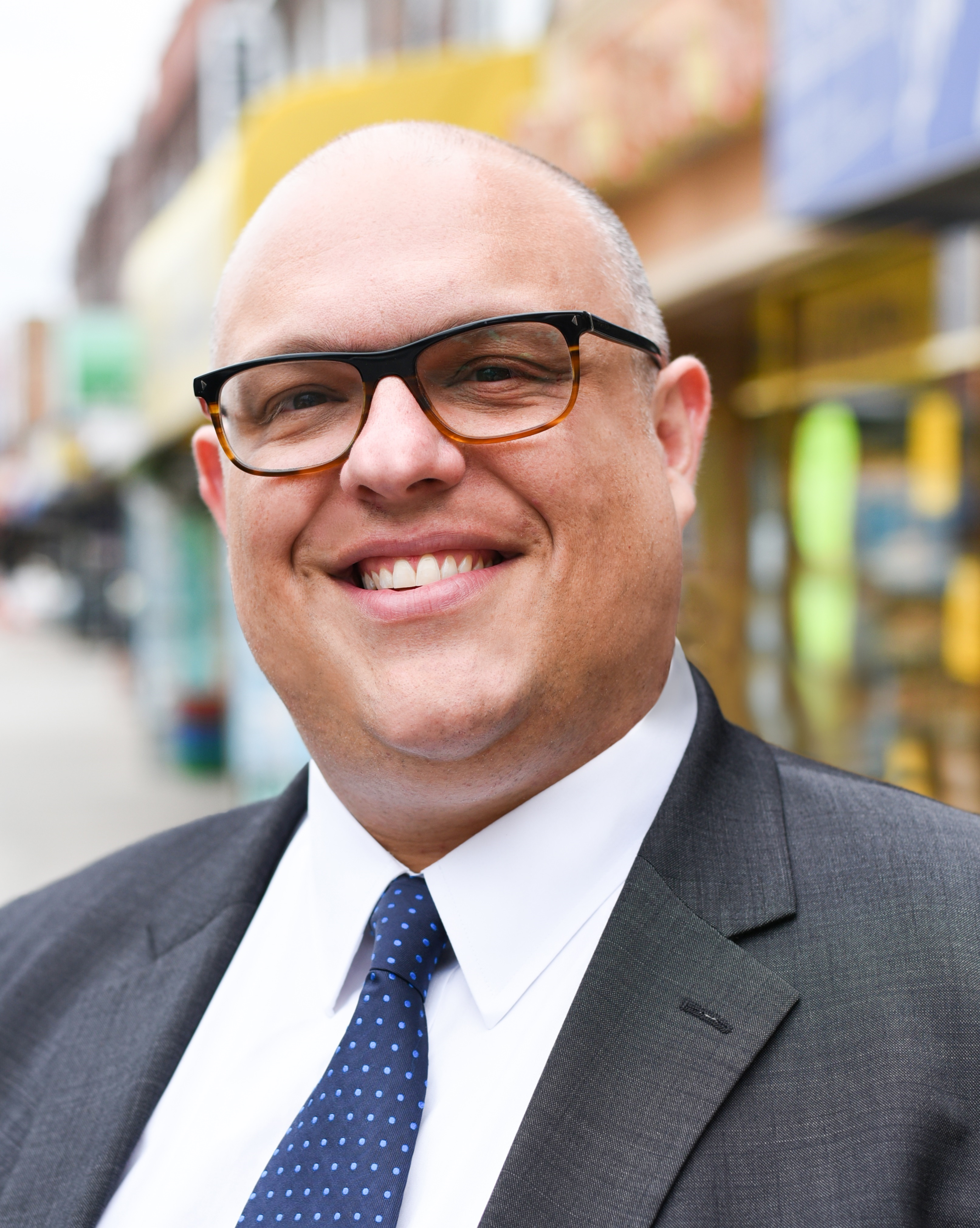

Member of the New York City Council
- In office January 1, 2018 – December 31, 2025
- Preceded by: Vincent Gentile
- Succeeded by: Kayla Santosuosso
- Constituency: 43rd district (2018–2023); 47th district (2024–2025)

Personal details
- Born: Justin Lee Brannan; October 14, 1978 (age 48) New York City, New York, U.S.
- Party: Democratic
- Spouse: Leigh Holliday
- Education: College of Staten Island (attended); Fordham University (BA)

Justin Lee Brannan (born October 14, 1978) is an American politician and musician. A Democrat, he was the New York City Councilmember for the 47th district from 2018 to 2025. A former musician, he was a founding member of the New York City hardcore bands Indecision and Most Precious Blood.

== Personal life ==
Brannan attended Xaverian High School in Bay Ridge, Brooklyn. He studied journalism and mass media at Fordham University and the College of Staten Island.

Brannan is an outspoken vegetarian and animal welfare advocate. A Third Degree Master Freemason, Brannan founded the Bay Ridge Democrats, an active Democratic political club based in southwest Brooklyn. In 2012 he was named one of the "New York City Rising Stars: 40 Under 40" by City & State newspaper for his work as Director of Communications and Legislative Affairs for New York City Councilman Vincent Gentile.

Brannan is married to artist and educator Leigh Jewel Holliday. The couple were married in the lobby of Bear Stearns, where they met as employees. Brannan and Holliday opened a fine art school for children in Bay Ridge called The Art Room.

== Career ==
=== Music career ===
Before entering politics, Justin Brannan was a hardcore punk guitarist for the bands Indecision from 1993 to 2000 and Most Precious Blood from 2000 onwards. Both bands were known for their outspoken commitment to social justice and vegetarianism. The band’s messages focused on social justice, human rights, environmentalism, relationships, individuality and espousing straight-edge views against drugs, alcohol and promiscuous sex.

Indecision is widely known for their song "Hallowed be Thy Name". The song features a lyric ("For Those I Love I Will Sacrifice") written by Brannan when he was sixteen years old that fans across the world have turned into a tattoo. Most famously, an image of the tattoo was seen on the ribs of a 19-year-old US Army infantryman named Kyle Hockenberry being treated in a medevac helicopter following an explosion that cost him both of his legs and one arm. The photo was taken for a military newspaper and won photographer Laura Rauch an award from the Society of Professional Journalists. Brannan also works closely with the 9/11 Stephen Siller Tunnel to Towers Foundation commemorating the heroes of 9/11 and "Building for America’s Bravest", a program that constructs Smart Homes for military returning home with devastating injuries.

Brannan also founded the deathgrind band Caninus, known for using two dogs as vocalists.

=== Finance career ===
Brannan was a touring punk rock musician before he landed at Bear Stearns, working his way up as a clerk in their wealth management division, and working as a financier in the venture capital space raising money for start-up alternative energy companies based in Silicon Valley. He later worked as a fundraising consultant for a number of non-profit humanitarian organizations in New York City.

== Political career ==
Brannan served as the Director of Communications and Legislative Affairs for Council member Vincent J. Gentile, representing the 43rd district which includes Bay Ridge, Bath Beach, Dyker Heights and portions of Bensonhurst.

=== City Council ===
In 2017, Brannan won the Democratic primary to replace Gentile in the 43rd district. Brannan won 39% of the vote in a five-way race, beating Khader El-Yateem, who garnered 31% of the vote, by 682 votes.

Brannan drew criticism from The Indypendent newspaper during the campaign for accepting certain campaign contributions from real estate interests. Contributors to Brannan's campaign included $2,000 from Sal Raziano, a senior realtor of the real estate firm Casandra Properties and Anthony Constantinople (an amount under $1,000) of Constantinople & Vallone, a lobbying firm under investigation in 2017 for accusations of conflicts of interest and payroll discrepancies at its Sports & Arts program at a Lower East Side public school. During the campaign, two of his opponent’s opponent’s employees and a third supporter of his opponent filed a complaint with the New York City Campaign Finance Board in which they accused Brannan of neglecting to disclose campaign expenses when he failed to alert election regulators that Gentile’s campaign for Brooklyn DA paid the $2,000 rent for Brannan’s campaign office; Brannan’s campaign called the claims baseless.

In the general election, Brannan won with 51% of the vote to the Republican candidate, John Quaglione's 47%. Brannan won by a slightly smaller margin in the 2021 election.

In the 2023 election for a redrawn 47th district, Brannan defeated his Republican colleague Ari Kagan by 58 to 41 percent after they were drawn into the same district.

=== 2025 Comptroller campaign ===
Following the decision by New York City Comptroller Brad Lander to challenge incumbent Eric Adams in the 2025 Democratic primary for mayor, Brannan opened a campaign account for Comptroller. During the campaign, Brannan also sponsored some surveys for Public Policy Polling.

Politico declared Mark Levine the winner of the Democratic primary for City Comptroller on June 24, 2025.

== Electoral history ==
Electoral history
Location	Year	Election	Results
NYC Council District 43	2017	Democratic Primary	√ Justin Brannan 38.66% Khader El-Yateem 30.89% Nancy Tong 15.84% Vincent Chirico 8.02% Kevin Peter Carroll 6.36%
NYC Council District 43	2017	General	√ Justin Brannan (D) 50.23% John Quaglione (R) 47.14% Robert Capano (Reform) 1.34% Angel Medina (Women's Equality) 1.09%

2021 New York City Council District 43 General Election
Party	Candidate	Votes	%
Democratic	Justin Brannan	12,202	
Working Families	Justin Brannan	1,178	
Total	Justin Brannan (incumbent)	13,180	51.1
Republican	Brian Fox	11,387	
Conservative	Brian Fox	1,192	
Total	Brian Fox	12,718	48.7
Write-in		45	0.2
Total votes		25,804	100
Democratic hold			

2025 New York City Democratic comptroller primary
Candidate	First round		Second round		Final round	
Candidate	Votes	%	Votes	%	Votes	%
Mark D. Levine	444,067	47.98%	444,482	48.14%	491,551	58.72%
Justin Brannan	308,637	33.35%	308,837	33.45%	345,628	41.28%
Ismael Malavé-Pérez	96,049	10.38%	96,259	10.43%	—	
Kevin Parker	73,322	7.92%	73,677	7.98%	—	
Write-ins	3,475	0.38%	—		—	
Total active votes	925,550	100.00%	923,255	100.00%	837,179	100.00%
Exhausted ballots	—		2,295	0.25%	86,076	9.32%

== See also ==
- Joe Keithley, Canadian punk musician and politician
