= Mark Treyger =

American politician (born 1982)

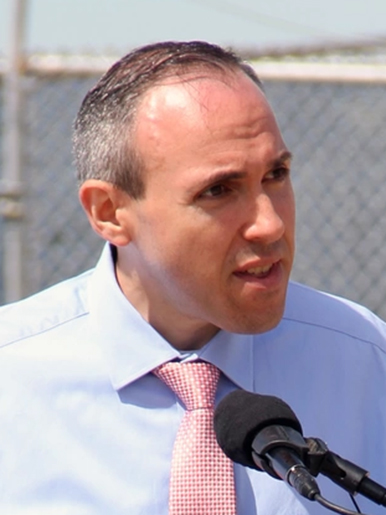
- Treyger in 2016

Executive Director of Intergovernmental Affairs at the New York City Department of Education
- Incumbent
- Assumed office January 19, 2022
- Chancellor: David Banks; Melissa Aviles-Ramos

Member of the New York City Council from the 47th district
- In office January 1, 2014 – December 31, 2021
- Preceded by: Domenic Recchia
- Succeeded by: Ari Kagan

Personal details
- Born: April 15, 1982 (age 44) Brooklyn, New York, U.S.
- Party: Democratic
- Education: Brooklyn College (BA), (MA)
- Website: Official website

Mark Treyger (born April 15, 1982) is an American politician who served in the New York City Council for the 47th district from 2014 to 2021. He is a Democrat. The district includes portions of Bath Beach, Bensonhurst, Coney Island, Gravesend, and Sea Gate in Brooklyn.

== Early life and education ==
Treyger was born in Brooklyn, New York. One of two children, he was the first in his family to be born in the United States. His sister Elina and his parents were all born in Ukraine, having emigrated from Mohyliv-Podilskyi. Raised in Bensonhurst, Brooklyn, he went to P.S./I.S. 226 and Edward R. Murrow High School. He received his bachelor's degree in political science and master's degree in social studies education both from Brooklyn College.

== Teaching career ==
Treyger taught history at New Utrecht High School in Brooklyn and served as a delegate for the United Federation of Teachers.

== New York City Council ==
In 2013, Councilman Domenic Recchia was term-limited and unable to run again. Treyger was elected to the City Council in the November 2013 elections. Four years later, he was re-elected winning by a landslide receiving 73% of the votes. In 2018 Treyger was appointed by Council Speaker Corey Johnson to chair the New York City Council's Education Committee.

Election history
Location	Year	Election	Results
NYC Council District 47	2013	Democratic Primary	√ Mark Treyger 45.92% Todd Dobrin 28.38% John Lisyanskiy 25.70%
NYC Council District 47	2013	General	√ Mark Treyger (D) 70.33% Andy Sullivan (R) 26.68% Connis M. Mobley (School Choice) 1.89%
NYC Council District 47	2017	General	√ Mark Treyger (D) 72.44% Raimondo Denaro (R) 27.38%

Political offices
Preceded by Domenic Recchia	New York City Council, 47th district 2014–2021	Succeeded by Ari Kagan
