= Khader El-Yateem =

Palestinian and American community organizer and Lutheran pastor (born 1968)

- خضر اليتيم
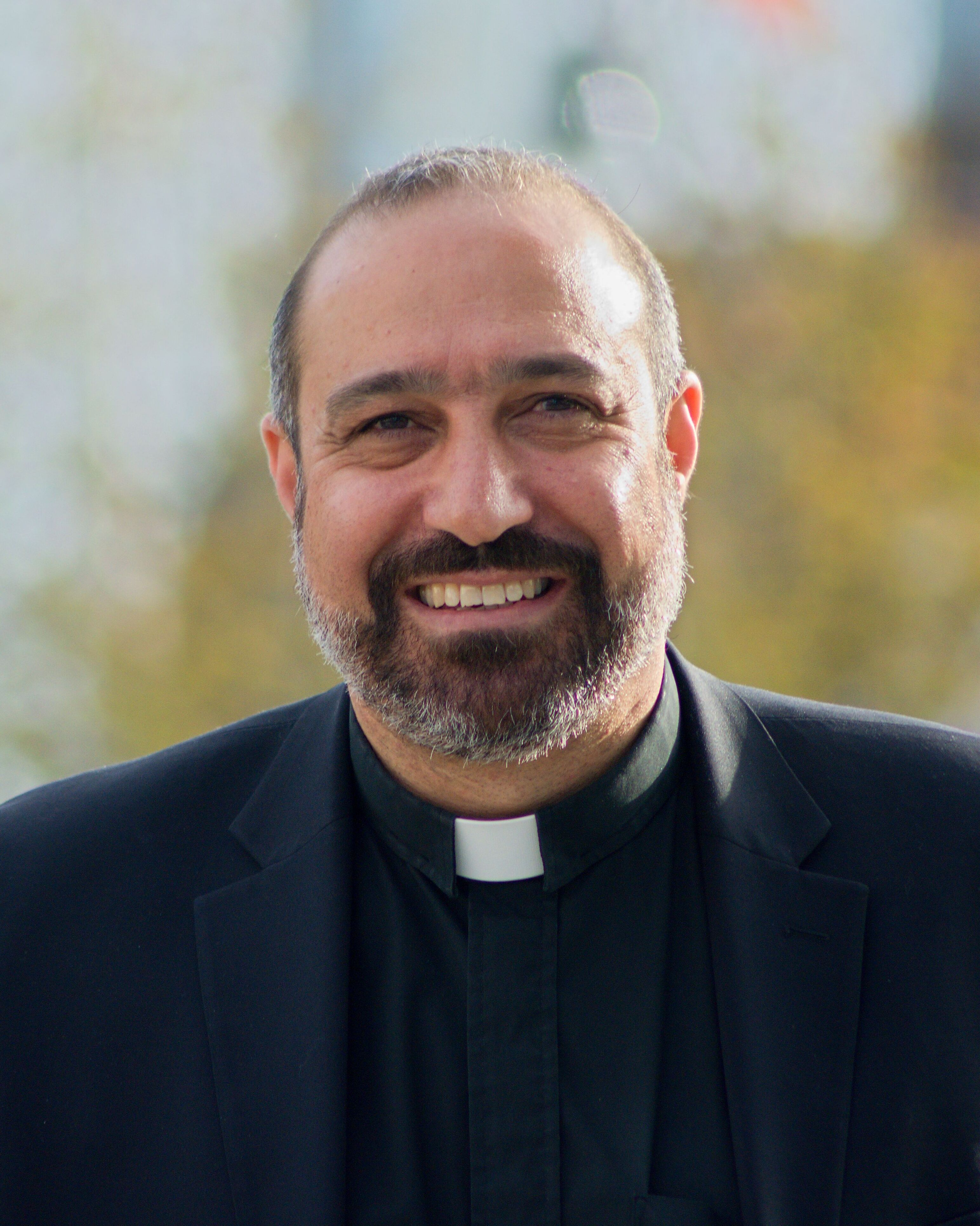
- El-Yateem in 2017
- Born: October 20, 1968 (age 57); Bethlehem, West Bank
- Education: Lutheran Theological Seminary at Philadelphia
- Political party: Democratic Socialists of America

Khader El-Yateem (Arabic: خضر اليتيم; born October 20, 1968) is a Palestinian and American community organizer and Lutheran pastor, who is a member of the Democratic Socialists of America. He is the executive director for service and justice at the Evangelical Lutheran Church in America (ELCA). El-Yateem ran in the 2017 Democratic primary for District 43 of the New York City Council, where he was defeated by Justin Brannan.

== Early life and education ==
El-Yateem was born on October 20, 1968, in Beit Jala, Bethlehem, West Bank, to an Arab Christian family. He received a Bachelor of Theology degree from Bethlehem Bible College in 1989, and a Bachelor of Theology and World Religions degree from the Evangelical Theological Seminary in Cairo (ETSC) in Egypt in 1991. He emigrated to the United States in 1992, and received a Master of Divinity from the Lutheran Theological Seminary at Philadelphia in 1996.

== Career ==
In 1995, El-Yateem changed the name of the “Salem Church” in Bay Ridge, Brooklyn, New York City, which for the prior 103 years had been a church for primarily Danish and Norwegian immigrants to Brooklyn and their descendants, to “Salam Arabic Church,” and became its new pastor. He introduced prayers being conducted in Arabic. He noted in 2001: "When I walk on Fifth Avenue [in Bay Ridge] I feel like I am back in Bethlehem. So many people are speaking Arabic."

The congregation under him primarily consisted of recent immigrant Arab Christians of various denominations and nationalities, many of whom fled the Middle East, some to escape violence in the Middle East in Syria and Iraq; in 2001 most of his congregants were from Syria. They included Egyptian Copts, Iraqi Chaldeans, Lebanese Maronites, Greek Catholics and Greek Orthodox, Roman Catholics, and Presbyterians originally from Egypt, Iraq, Lebanon, Palestine, and Syria. El-Yateem's work at the congregation was praised by Bishop Gregory John Mansour, who described him as "a great bridge builder".

In the wider community, El-Yateem was as of 2015 a religious leader of the Bay Ridge Unity Task Force — formed at the request of Brooklyn DA Charles Hynes by civic activists, business leaders, and Muslim, Christian, and Jewish religious leaders to combat bigotry. In 2012, the Bay Ridge Community Council presented its Civic Award to El-Yateem for his work at Salam Arabic Lutheran Church and the Bay Ridge Unity Task Force. Additionally, El-Yateem served as a board member of Community Board 10 and the Arab American Association of New York, along with being longtime leader in voter registration efforts in Bay Ridge's Arab community. He also worked in patient relations at Maimonides Medical Center from 2010 to 2017 before leaving to run for City Council.

In August 2017, El-Yateem and others urged the Episcopal Diocese of Long Island to remove an iron plaque commemorating a tree planted in the 1840s by Confederate General Robert E. Lee from a cemetery in Fort Hamilton, placed there in 1912 by the United Daughters of the Confederacy, in the wake of violence surrounding the Unite the Right rally to protest a similar memorial's removal in Charlottesville, Virginia.

In May 2018, El-Yateem announced that he would be moving to Florida. He would serve as assistant to the bishop and director for evangelical mission with the ELCA Florida-Bahamas Synod until 2024 when he was appointed ELCA Executive Director for Service and Justice. In addition, El-Yateem is the President of the ELCA Association of Lutherans of Arab and Middle Eastern Heritage along with serving on several ELCA boards and committees.

=== City Council campaign ===
In 2017, El-Yateem ran in the Democratic primary for District 43 of the New York City Council, covering Bay Ridge, Dyker Heights, Bensonhurst and Bath Beach. His campaign was endorsed by the New York City chapter of Democratic Socialists of America, of which he is a member.

El-Yateem said that he "100%" supported the Boycott, Divestment and Sanctions movement. He was endorsed by political activist Linda Sarsour.

El-Yateem finished second in the primary with 31% of the vote (2,932 votes) to Justin Brannan's 39%, in a five-way race.
