= Brooklyn Community Board 11 =

Brooklyn Community District 11
- Community District
- Country: United States
- State: New York
- City: New York City
- Borough: Brooklyn
- Neighborhoods: List: Bath Beach; Bensonhurst; Gravesend; Mapleton

Government
  - Chairperson: Laurie Windsor
  - District Manager: Marnee Elias-Pavia

Area
  - Total: 3.7 sq mi (9.6 km^{2})

Population (2020)
  - Total: 198,527
  - Density: 54,000/sq mi (21,000/km^{2})

Ethnicity
  - African-American: 1.2%
  - Asian: 43.5%
  - Hispanic and Latino Americans: 15.8%
  - White: 36.3%
  - Two or more: 2.7%
- Time zone: UTC−5 (Eastern)
  - Summer (DST): UTC−4 (EDT)
- ZIP codes: 11204, 11214, 11223 and 11228
- Area code: 718, 347, 929, and 917
- Police Precincts: 62nd (website)
- Website: www.brooklyncb11.org

Brooklyn Community Board 11 is New York City community board that encompasses the Brooklyn neighborhoods of Bath Beach, Gravesend, Mapleton, and Bensonhurst. It is delimited by Bay 8th Street and 14th Avenue on the west, 61st Street on the north, McDonald Avenue on the east, as well as by Avenue U and Gravesend Bay on the south.

The current chairperson is Laurie Windsor, and the current district manager is Marnee Elias-Pavia.

As of the 2020 United States Census, the Community Board has a population of 198,527 up from 182,000 from the 2010 Census. As of 2020 the population formed of, (43.5%) Asian, (36.3%) White Non-Hispanic, (1.2%) Black Non-Hispanic, and (2.7%) Two or more races. The Hispanic population is at (15.8%).

In the 2010 United States census, the Community Board has a population of 182,000 up from 172,129 in 2000. As of 2010 the population formed of, (44.2%) White Non-Hispanic, (0.9%) Black, (39.1%) Asian, (1.5%) Other Race, and (14.4%) of Hispanic origin. With over 55.5% of the residents being foreign born.
