= Arab American Association of New York =

- Formation: 2001
- Type: 501(c)(3) organization
- Tax ID no.: 11-3604756
- Purpose: Civil rights
- Headquarters: New York, United States
- Official language: English, Arabic
- Website: www.arabamericanny.org

The Arab American Association of New York is an Arab American and Muslim civil rights organization located in New York.

Linda Sarsour was the former executive director of the organization until stepping down from the position in 2017.
