= Brooklyn Community Board 13 =

Brooklyn Community District 13
- Community District
- Country: United States
- State: New York
- City: New York City
- Borough: Brooklyn
- Neighborhoods: List: Brighton Beach; Coney Island; Gravesend; Seagate

Government
  - Chairperson: Jeffrey Sanoff
  - District Manager: Eddie Mark

Area
  - Total: 3.2 sq mi (8.3 km^{2})

Population (2010)
  - Total: 104,278
  - Density: 33,000/sq mi (13,000/km^{2})

Ethnicity
  - African-American: 11.1%
  - Asian: 14.0%
  - Hispanic and Latino Americans: 15.7%
  - White: 56.6%
  - Others: 2.5%
- Time zone: UTC−5 (Eastern)
  - Summer (DST): UTC−4 (EDT)
- ZIP codes: 11204, 11214, 11223, 11224 and 11235
- Area code: 718, 347, 929, and 917
- Police Precincts: 60th (website)
- Website: www1.nyc.gov/site/brooklyncb13/index.page

Brooklyn Community Board 13 is a New York City community board that encompasses the Brooklyn neighborhoods of Coney Island, Brighton Beach, Gravesend, and Seagate. It is delimited by Gravesend Bay on the west, 26th Avenue, 86th Street, Avenue Y on the north, Coney Island Avenue and Corbin Place on the east, as well as by Lower New York Bay on the south.

Its current chair is Jeffrey Sanoff, and its district manager is Eddie Mark.

As of the 2000 United States census, the Community Board has a population of 106,120, up from 102,596 in 1990 and 100,030 in 1980.

Of them (as of 2000), 58,684 (55.3%) are White non Hispanic, 16,654 (15.7%) are African-American, 10,079 (9.5%) Asian or Pacific Islander, 191 (0.2%) American Indian or Native Alaskan, 304 (0.3%) of some other race, 2.955 (2.8%) of two or more race, 17,253 (16.3%) of Hispanic origins.

41.0% of the population benefit from public assistance as of 2004, up from 30.0% in 2000.

The land area is 2,198.0 acres (8.895 km^{2}).
