= 2010 New York State Senate election =

- November 2, 2010

All 62 seats in the New York State Senate 32 seats needed for a majority
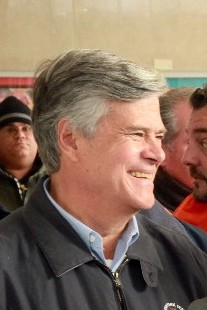

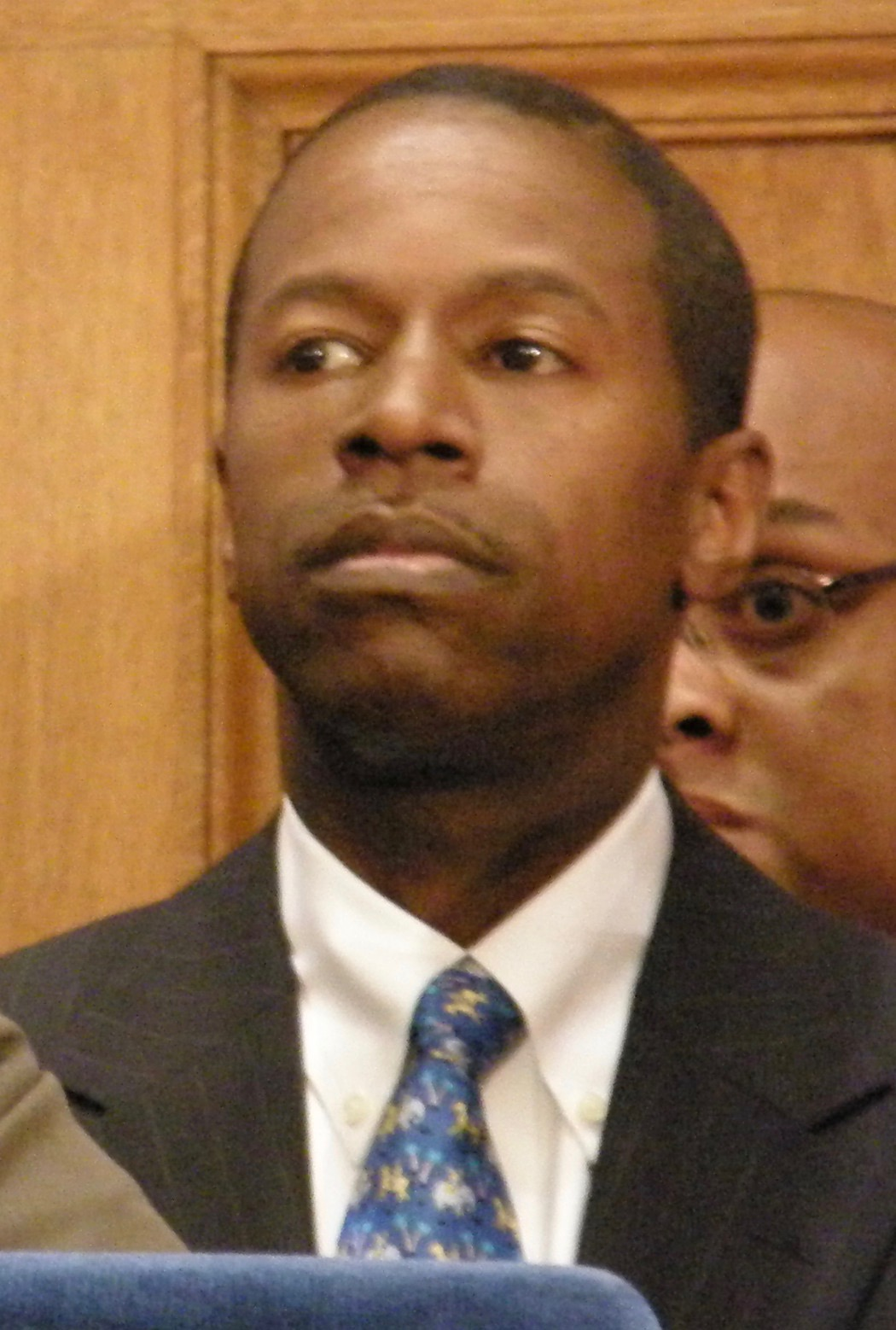
	Majority party	Minority party
Leader	Dean Skelos	Malcolm Smith
Party	Republican	Democratic
Leader's seat	9th District	14th District
Seats before	30	32
Seats after	32	30
Seat change	▲2	▼2
- Results: Democratic hold Democratic gain Republican hold Republican gain
Temporary President and Majority Leader before election
Malcolm Smith
Democratic
Temporary President and Majority Leader
Dean Skelos
Republican

The 2010 New York State Senate elections were held on November 2, 2010, to elect representatives from all 62 State Senate districts in the U.S. state of New York. Primary elections were held on September 14, 2010. Republicans retook the Senate majority, winning 32 seats to the Democrats' 30 on Election Day.

One Republican Senate incumbent, Senator Frank Padavan of Queens, was defeated, while four Democratic incumbents (Sens. Brian Foley, Antoine Thompson, Darrel Aubertine, and Craig Johnson) were defeated in the general election. Democratic candidate David Carlucci was elected to an open seat in Senate District 38 that had become vacant due to the July 2010 death of Republican Senator Thomas Morahan. Incumbent Democrat William Stachowski was defeated by Timothy M. Kennedy in a Democratic primary in Senate District 58, and Kennedy prevailed in the general election. The Republicans' takeover of control of the State Senate was not confirmed until Johnson, who had sought a full hand recount of his race, exhausted his final court appeal on December 20, 2010.

== Predictions ==
Source	Ranking	As of
Governing	Tossup	November 1, 2010

== District 1 ==
New York's 1st State Senate district election, 2010
Party	Candidate	Votes	%
Republican	Kenneth LaValle (incumbent)	65,611	66.5
Democratic	Jennifer J. Maertz	33,094	33.5
Total votes		98,705	100.0
Republican hold			

== District 2 ==
New York's 2nd State Senate district election, 2010
Party	Candidate	Votes	%
Republican	John J. Flanagan (incumbent)	61,842	69.8
Democratic	Ira L. Bernstein	26,750	30.2
Total votes		88,592	100.0
Republican hold			

== District 3 ==
New York's 3rd State Senate district election, 2010
Party	Candidate	Votes	%
Republican	Lee Zeldin	41,063	57.1
Democratic	Brian X. Foley (incumbent)	30,876	42.9
Total votes		71,939	100.0
Republican gain from Democratic			

== District 4 ==
New York's 4th State Senate district election, 2010
Party	Candidate	Votes	%
Republican	Owen H. Johnson (incumbent)	43,799	66.4
Democratic	Maeghan H. Lollo	22,197	33.6
Total votes		65,996	100.0
Republican hold			

== District 5 ==
New York's 5th State Senate district election, 2010
Party	Candidate	Votes	%
Republican	Carl Marcellino (incumbent)	58,064	62.2
Democratic	Lawrence H. Silverman	35,336	37.8
Total votes		93,400	100.0
Republican hold			

== District 6 ==
New York's 6th State Senate district election, 2010
Party	Candidate	Votes	%
Republican	Kemp Hannon (incumbent)	45,970	58.7
Democratic	Francesca Carlow	30,328	38.7
Working Families	David L. Mejias	2,013	2.6
Total votes		78,311	100.0
Republican hold			

== District 7 ==
New York's 7th State Senate district election, 2010
Party	Candidate	Votes	%
Republican	Jack Martins	42,928	50.3
Democratic	Craig M. Johnson (incumbent)	42,477	49.7
Total votes		85,405	100.0
Republican gain from Democratic			

== District 8 ==
New York's 8th State Senate district election, 2010
Party	Candidate	Votes	%
Republican	Charles Fuschillo (incumbent)	53,439	64.5
Democratic	Carol A. Gordon	29,384	35.5
Total votes		82,823	100.0
Republican hold			

== District 9 ==
New York's 9th State Senate district election, 2010
Party	Candidate	Votes	%
Republican	Dean Skelos (incumbent)	59,252	65.8
Democratic	George S. Sava	30,804	34.2
Total votes		90,056	100.0
Republican hold			

== District 10 ==
New York's 10th State Senate district election, 2010
Party	Candidate	Votes	%
Democratic	Shirley Huntley (incumbent)	47,186	100.0
Total votes		47,186	100.0
Democratic hold			

== District 11 ==
New York's 11th State Senate district election, 2010
Party	Candidate	Votes	%
Democratic	Tony Avella	31,573	54.3
Republican	Frank Padavan (incumbent)	26,571	45.7
Total votes		58,144	100.0
Democratic gain from Republican			

== District 12 ==
New York's 12th State Senate district election, 2010
Party	Candidate	Votes	%
Democratic	Michael Gianaris	31,737	81.3
Republican	Jerome Patrick Tina Jr.	7,320	18.7
Total votes		39,057	100.0
Democratic hold			

== District 13 ==
New York's 13th State Senate district election, 2010
Party	Candidate	Votes	%
Democratic	Jose Peralta (incumbent)	23,962	82.8
Republican	Richard La Salle	4,979	17.2
Total votes		28,941	100.0
Democratic hold			

== District 14 ==
New York's 14th State Senate district election, 2010
Party	Candidate	Votes	%
Democratic	Malcolm Smith (incumbent)	43,356	81.5
Republican	Samuel Benoit	7,798	14.7
Conservative	Everly Brown	2,033	3.8
Total votes		53,187	100.0
Democratic hold			

== District 15 ==
New York's 15th State Senate district election, 2010
Party	Candidate	Votes	%
Democratic	Joseph Addabbo Jr. (incumbent)	23,272	56.9
Republican	Anthony Como	17,594	43.1
Total votes		40,866	100.0
Democratic hold			

== District 16 ==
New York's 16th State Senate district election, 2010
Party	Candidate	Votes	%
Democratic	Toby Ann Stavisky (incumbent)	34,471	87.0
Conservative	Robert Schwartz	5,171	13.0
Total votes		39,642	100.0
Democratic hold			

== District 17 ==
New York's 17th State Senate district election, 2010
Party	Candidate	Votes	%
Democratic	Martin Malave Dilan (incumbent)	31,483	91.1
Republican	Michael E. Freeman-Saulsberre	3,084	8.9
Total votes		34,567	100.0
Democratic hold			

== District 18 ==
New York's 18th State Senate district election, 2010
Party	Candidate	Votes	%
Democratic	Velmanette Montgomery (incumbent)	54,317	95.9
Republican	Laquan O. Word	2,330	4.1
Total votes		56,647	100.0
Democratic hold			

== District 19 ==
New York's 19th State Senate district election, 2010
Party	Candidate	Votes	%
Democratic	John L. Sampson (incumbent)	43,450	93.4
Republican	Rose Laney	3,071	6.6
Total votes		46,521	100.0
Democratic hold			

== District 20 ==
New York's 20th State Senate district election, 2010
Party	Candidate	Votes	%
Democratic	Eric Adams (incumbent)	51,598	92.2
Republican	Allan E. Romaguera	4,352	7.8
Total votes		55,950	100.0
Democratic hold			

== District 21 ==
New York's 21st State Senate district election, 2010
Party	Candidate	Votes	%
Democratic	Kevin Parker (incumbent)	38,327	84.6
Republican	Jeffrey Lodge	5,950	13.1
Conservative	Brian Kelly	1,024	2.3
Total votes		45,301	100.0
Democratic hold			

== District 22 ==
New York's 22nd State Senate district election, 2010
Party	Candidate	Votes	%
Republican	Martin Golden (incumbent)	28,270	65.8
Democratic	Michael DiSanto	14,666	34.2
Total votes		42,936	100.0
Republican hold			

== District 23 ==
New York's 23rd State Senate district election, 2010
Party	Candidate	Votes	%
Democratic	Diane Savino (incumbent)	29,908	100.0
Total votes		29,908	100.0
Democratic hold			

== District 24 ==
New York's 24th State Senate district election, 2010
Party	Candidate	Votes	%
Republican	Andrew Lanza (incumbent)	54,602	100.0
Total votes		54,602	100.0
Republican hold			

== District 25 ==
New York's 25th State Senate district election, 2010
Party	Candidate	Votes	%
Democratic	Daniel Squadron (incumbent)	50,485	86.0
Republican	Joseph A. Nardiello	8,217	14.0
Total votes		58,702	100.0
Democratic hold			

== District 26 ==
New York's 26th State Senate district election, 2010
Party	Candidate	Votes	%
Democratic	Liz Krueger (incumbent)	56,222	70.4
Republican	Saul J. Farber	23,634	29.6
Total votes		79,856	100.0
Democratic hold			

== District 27 ==
New York's 27th State Senate district election, 2010
Party	Candidate	Votes	%
Democratic	Carl Kruger (incumbent)	25,004	73.2
Conservative	Avrahom Rosenberg	9,152	26.8
Total votes		34,156	100.0
Democratic hold			

== District 28 ==
New York's 28th State Senate district election, 2010
Party	Candidate	Votes	%
Democratic	Jose M. Serrano (incumbent)	33,115	91.2
Republican	Jon Girodes	2,631	7.2
Conservative	Keesha S. Weiner	568	1.6
Total votes		36,314	100.0
Democratic hold			

== District 29 ==
New York's 29th State Senate district election, 2010
Party	Candidate	Votes	%
Democratic	Thomas Duane (incumbent)	71,645	85.2
Republican	Joseph A. Mendola	12,475	14.8
Total votes		84,120	100.0
Democratic hold			

== District 30 ==
New York's 30th State Senate district election, 2010
Party	Candidate	Votes	%
Democratic	Bill Perkins (incumbent)	56,793	93.7
Republican	Donal Yarbrough	3,795	6.3
Total votes		60,588	100.0
Democratic hold			

== District 31 ==
New York's 31st State Senate district election, 2010
Party	Candidate	Votes	%
Democratic	Adriano Espaillat	50,007	84.0
Republican	Stylo Sapaskis	6,388	10.8
Green	Ann J. Roos	2,158	3.6
Conservative	Raphael M. Klapper	964	1.6
Total votes		59,517	100.0
Democratic hold			

== District 32 ==
New York's 32nd State Senate district election, 2010
Party	Candidate	Votes	%
Democratic	Rubén Díaz Sr. (incumbent)	35,266	90.3
Conservative	Michael E. Walters	3,795	9.7
Total votes		39,061	100.0
Democratic hold			

== District 33 ==
New York's 33rd State Senate district election, 2010
Party	Candidate	Votes	%
Democratic	Gustavo Rivera (incumbent)	27,417	97.1
Green	John Reynolds	833	2.9
Total votes		28,250	100.0
Democratic hold			

== District 34 ==
New York's 34th State Senate district election, 2010
Party	Candidate	Votes	%
Democratic	Jeffrey Klein (incumbent)	35,863	66.9
Republican	Frank V. Vernuccio Jr.	17,724	33.1
Total votes		53,587	100.0
Democratic hold			

== District 35 ==
New York's 35th State Senate district election, 2010
Party	Candidate	Votes	%
Democratic	Andrea Stewart-Cousins (incumbent)	42,982	55.6
Republican	Liam J. McLaughlin	34,260	44.4
Total votes		77,242	100.0
Democratic hold			

== District 36 ==
New York's 36th State Senate district election, 2010
Party	Candidate	Votes	%
Democratic	Ruth Hassell-Thompson (incumbent)	47,113	96.1
Republican	Robert L. Diamond	1,907	3.9
Total votes		49,020	100.0
Democratic hold			

== District 37 ==
New York's 37th State Senate district election, 2010
Party	Candidate	Votes	%
Democratic	Suzi Oppenheimer (incumbent)	45,300	50.4
Republican	Bob Cohen	44,572	49.6
Total votes		89,872	100.0
Democratic hold			

== District 38 ==
New York's 38th State Senate district election, 2010
Party	Candidate	Votes	%
Democratic	David Carlucci	51,515	53.0
Republican	C. Scott Vanderhoef	45,605	47.0
Total votes		97,120	100.0
Democratic gain from Republican			

== District 39 ==
New York's 39th State Senate district election, 2010
Party	Candidate	Votes	%
Republican	Bill Larkin (incumbent)	52,596	60.8
Democratic	Harley E. Doles, III	33,961	39.2
Total votes		86,557	100.0
Republican hold			

== District 40 ==
New York's 40th State Senate district election, 2010
Party	Candidate	Votes	%
Republican	Greg Ball	50,705	51.1
Democratic	Mike Kaplowitz	48,567	48.9
Total votes		99,272	100.0
Republican hold			

== District 41 ==
New York's 41st State Senate district election, 2010
Party	Candidate	Votes	%
Republican	Stephen Saland (incumbent)	56,680	59.7
Democratic	Didi Barrett	38,253	40.3
Total votes		94,933	100.0
Republican hold			

== District 42 ==
New York's 42nd State Senate district election, 2010
Party	Candidate	Votes	%
Republican	John Bonacic (incumbent)	52,533	59.5
Democratic	David A. Sager	35,745	40.5
Total votes		88,278	100.0
Republican hold			

== District 43 ==
New York's 43rd State Senate district election, 2010
Party	Candidate	Votes	%
Republican	Roy McDonald (incumbent)	64,811	58.2
Democratic	Joanne D. Yepsen	46,542	41.8
Total votes		111,353	100.0
Republican hold			

== District 44 ==
New York's 44th State Senate district election, 2010
Party	Candidate	Votes	%
Republican	Hugh Farley (incumbent)	61,771	64.2
Democratic	Susan E. Savage	34,433	35.8
Total votes		96,204	100.0
Republican hold			

== District 45 ==
New York's 45th State Senate district election, 2010
Party	Candidate	Votes	%
Republican	Betty Little (incumbent)	71,743	100.0
Total votes		71,743	100.0
Republican hold			

== District 46 ==
New York's 46th State Senate district election, 2010
Party	Candidate	Votes	%
Democratic	Neil Breslin (incumbent)	53,724	53.7
Republican	Robert L. Domenici	40,408	40.3
Reform	Michael J. Carey	5,980	6.0
Total votes		100,112	100.0
Democratic hold			

== District 47 ==
New York's 47th State Senate district election, 2010
Party	Candidate	Votes	%
Republican	Joseph Griffo (incumbent)	55,909	68.7
Democratic	Michael J. Hennessy	25,525	31.3
Total votes		81,434	100.0
Republican hold			

== District 48 ==
New York's 48th State Senate district election, 2010
Party	Candidate	Votes	%
Republican	Patty Ritchie	38,508	52.6
Democratic	Darrel Aubertine (incumbent)	34,712	47.4
Total votes		73,220	100.0
Republican gain from Democratic			

== District 49 ==
New York's 49th State Senate district election, 2010
Party	Candidate	Votes	%
Democratic	David Valesky (incumbent)	43,935	52.8
Republican	Andrew C. Russo	39,317	47.2
Total votes		83,252	100.0
Democratic hold			

== District 50 ==
New York's 50th State Senate district election, 2010
Party	Candidate	Votes	%
Republican	John DeFrancisco (incumbent)	58,892	64.8
Democratic	Kathleen Joy	31,997	35.2
Total votes		90,889	100.0
Republican hold			

== District 51 ==
New York's 51st State Senate district election, 2010
Party	Candidate	Votes	%
Republican	James L. Seward (incumbent)	66,956	68.7
Total votes		66,956	100.0
Republican hold			

== District 52 ==
New York's 52nd State Senate district election, 2010
Party	Candidate	Votes	%
Republican	Thomas W. Libous (incumbent)	52,700	61.2
Democratic	John P. Orzel	33,346	38.8
Total votes		86,046	100.0
Republican hold			

== District 53 ==
New York's 53rd State Senate district election, 2010
Party	Candidate	Votes	%
Republican	Tom O'Mara	46,226	59.5
Democratic	Pamela Mackesey	31,470	40.5
Total votes		77,696	100.0
Republican hold			

== District 54 ==
New York's 54th State Senate district election, 2010
Party	Candidate	Votes	%
Republican	Michael Nozzolio (incumbent)	61,958	69.6
Democratic	Edward J. O'Shea	27,059	30.4
Total votes		89,017	100.0
Republican hold			

== District 55 ==
New York's 55th State Senate district election, 2010
Party	Candidate	Votes	%
Republican	James Alesi (incumbent)	57,025	53.2
Democratic	Mary Wilmot	50,163	46.8
Total votes		107,188	100.0
Republican hold			

== District 56 ==
New York's 56th State Senate district election, 2010
Party	Candidate	Votes	%
Republican	Joseph Robach (incumbent)	46,506	61.9
Democratic	Robin Wilt	28,678	38.1
Total votes		75,184	100.0
Republican hold			

== District 57 ==
New York's 57th State Senate district election, 2010
Party	Candidate	Votes	%
Republican	Catharine Young (incumbent)	67,212	84.7
Democratic	Michael J. McCormick	12,121	15.3
Total votes		79,333	100.0
Republican hold			

== District 58 ==
New York's 58th State Senate district election, 2010
Party	Candidate	Votes	%
Democratic	Timothy M. Kennedy	42,757	47.2
Republican	Jack Quinn III	41,162	45.5
Independence	William Stachowski (incumbent)	6,611	7.3
Total votes		90,530	100.0
Democratic hold			

== District 59 ==
New York's 59th State Senate district election, 2010
Party	Candidate	Votes	%
Republican	Patrick Gallivan	59,208	58.7
Democratic	Cynthia M. Appleton	30,712	30.5
Independent	David DiPietro	10,850	10.8
Total votes		100,770	100.0
Republican hold			

== District 60 ==
New York's 60th State Senate district election, 2010
Party	Candidate	Votes	%
Republican	Mark Grisanti	33,243	50.4
Democratic	Antoine Thompson (incumbent)	32,724	49.6
Total votes		65,967	100.0
Republican gain from Democratic			

== District 61 ==
New York's 61st State Senate district election, 2010
Party	Candidate	Votes	%
Republican	Michael Ranzenhofer (incumbent)	63,467	62.9
Democratic	Marc A. Coppola	37,464	37.1
Total votes		100,931	100.0
Republican hold			

== District 62 ==
New York's 62nd State Senate district election, 2010
Party	Candidate	Votes	%
Republican	George D. Maziarz (incumbent)	59,097	67.6
Democratic	Amy Hope Witryol	28,386	32.4
Total votes		87,483	100.0
Republican hold			
