= New York City's 20th City Council district =

- Boundaries following the 2020 census

Government
  - Councilmember: Sandra Ung (D—Flushing)

Population (2010)
  - Total: 160,913

Demographics
  - Asian: 64%
  - Hispanic: 16%
  - White: 15%
  - Black: 3%
  - Other: 2%

Registration
  - Democratic: 56.7%
  - Republican: 10.9%
  - No party preference: 29.9%
- Registered voters (2021) 76,196

New York City's 20th City Council district is one of 51 districts in the New York City Council. It has been represented by Democrat Sandra Ung since 2022. She succeeded Republican-turned-Democrat Peter Koo, who was term-limited in 2021.

== Geography ==
District 20 is based in the Queens neighborhood of Flushing, covering its downtown areas as well as its Murray Hill and Queensboro Hill subsections. Kissena Park is located within the district.

The district overlaps with Queens Community Boards 7 and 11, and is contained entirely within New York's 6th congressional district. It also overlaps with the 11th and 16th districts of the New York State Senate, and with the 25th, 26th, and 40th districts of the New York State Assembly.

With its population base in Flushing, which has a large number of Korean and Chinese American residents, the 20th district is the most Asian district in the City Council and the only district with an Asian majority. Former 20th district councilmember John Liu was the first Asian American elected to the City Council. Until 2021, Liu's successor, Peter Koo, was one of only two Asian Americans in the body (alongside former Manhattan councilmember Margaret Chin). This number has increased to five.

== Recent election results ==
=== 2025 ===
2025 New York City Council election, District 20
Party	Candidate	Votes	%
Democratic	Sandra Ung (incumbent)	15,243	75.5
Conservative	Allen Wang	3,371	16.7
Asians United	Joseph Chou	898	4.4
Patriot	Steven Wang	619	3.1
Write-in		70	0.3
Total votes		20,201	100.0
Democratic hold			

=== 2023 (redistricting) ===
Due to redistricting and the 2020 changes to the New York City Charter, councilmembers elected during the 2021 and 2023 City Council elections will serve two-year terms, with full four-year terms resuming after the 2025 New York City Council elections.

2023 New York City Council election, District 20
Primary election
Party	Candidate	Votes	%
Republican	Yu-Ching Pai	819	56.0
Republican	Dany Chen	638	43.6
Write-in		6	0.4
Total votes		1,463	100
General election
Democratic	Sandra Ung (incumbent)	5,087	57.8
Republican	Yu-Ching Pai	2,524	
Conservative	Yu-Ching Pai	275	
Total	Yu-Ching Pai	2,799	31.8
Better Flushing	Dany Chen	863	9.8
Write-in		49	0.6
Total votes		8,798	100.0
Democratic hold			

=== 2021 ===
In 2019, voters in New York City approved Ballot Question 1, which implemented ranked-choice voting in all local elections. Under the new system, voters have the option to rank up to five candidates for every local office. Voters whose first-choice candidates fare poorly will have their votes redistributed to other candidates in their ranking until one candidate surpasses the 50 percent threshold. If one candidate surpasses 50 percent in first-choice votes, then ranked-choice tabulations will not occur.

2021 New York City Council election, District 20 Democratic primary
Party	Candidate	Maximum round	Maximum votes	Share in maximum round	Maximum votes First round votes Transfer votes
Democratic	Sandra Ung	8	4,205	55.2%	
Democratic	Ellen Young	8	3,406	44.8%	
Democratic	Neng Wang	7	2,146	25.2%	
Democratic	John Choe	6	1,845	20.2%	
Democratic	Anthony Miranda	5	1,550	15.9%	
Democratic	Hailing Chen	4	1,337	12.8%	
Democratic	Dao Yin	3	968	9.1%	
Democratic	Ming-Kang Low	2	50	0.5%	
Write-in		1	13	0.1%	

An interactive map of District 20

2021 New York City Council election, District 20 general election
Party	Candidate	Votes	%
Democratic	Sandra Ung	7,718	59.3
Republican	Yu-Ching Pai	4,781	
Conservative	Yu-Ching Pai	487	
Total	Yu-Ching Pai	5,268	40.4
Write-in		35	0.3
Total votes		13,021	100
Democratic hold			

=== 2017 ===
2017 New York City Council election, District 20
Primary election
Party	Candidate	Votes	%
Democratic	Peter Koo (incumbent)	3,822	58.2
Democratic	Alison Tan	2,719	41.4
Write-in		27	0.4
Total votes		6,568	100
General election
Democratic	Peter Koo (incumbent)	9,065	97.8
Write-in		202	2.2
Total votes		9,267	100
Democratic hold			

=== 2013 ===
2013 New York City Council election, District 20
Party	Candidate	Votes	%
Democratic	Peter Koo	7,985	
Conservative	Peter Koo	1,088	
Total	Peter Koo (incumbent)	9,073	79.7
Jobs & Education	Martha Flores-Vazquez	1,182	10.4
Reform	Sunny Hahn	729	6.4
Green	Evergreen Chou	385	3.4
Write-in		20	0.1
Total votes		11,389	100
Democratic gain from Republican			

=== 2009 ===
2009 New York City Council election, District 20
Primary election
Party	Candidate	Votes	%
Democratic	Yen Chou	1,935	24.9
Democratic	S.J. Jung	1,752	22.6
Democratic	Isaac Sasson	1,741	22.4
Democratic	John Choe	1,267	16.3
Democratic	James Wu	1,073	13.8
Write-in		1	0.0
Total votes		7,769	100
General election
Republican	Peter Koo	7,185	
Independence	Peter Koo	752	
Conservative	Peter Koo	512	
Total	Peter Koo	8,449	49.1
Democratic	Yen Chou	7,793	45.2
Working Families	S.J. Jung	700	4.1
Green	Evergreen Chou	282	1.6
Write-in		1	0.0
Total votes		17,225	100
Republican gain from Democratic			
