= Dan Halloran =

American lawyer (born 1971)

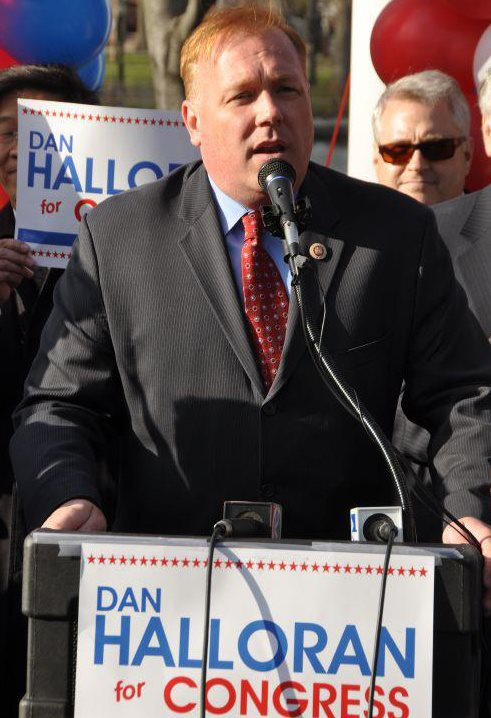
- Halloran in 2012

Member of the New York City Council from the 19th district
- In office January 1, 2010 – December 31, 2013
- Preceded by: Tony Avella
- Succeeded by: Paul Vallone

Personal details
- Born: March 16, 1971 (age 55) New York City, U.S.
- Party: Republican
- Education: Fordham University, Queens College, St. John's University School of Law

Daniel J. Halloran III (born March 16, 1971) is a former member of the New York City Council. He was the first adherent of Theodism ever elected to the council and one of the first neo-Pagans to hold an elected office in the US.

In 2013 the United States Attorney for the Southern District of New York indicted Halloran for his role in a corrupt scheme to steer New York Republican county committees to support Malcolm Smith's campaign for the 2013 New York City mayoral election. He was convicted in a jury trial July 2014 and sentenced to ten years in prison. He was released from prison ahead of schedule in 2020 due to COVID-19 related concerns.

In 2025, Halloran was arrested and indicted for possession and transportation of child sexual abuse material. He has plead not guilty. As of October 2026 this case awaits trial.

== Personal life ==
Halloran was raised in a "traditional Irish household" and was a karaoke host and an attorney prior to running for office. He earned his Juris Doctor (J.D.) from St. John's University Law School and a B.A. in history and anthropology from the City University of New York. He worked in the New York City Police Department and several District Attorneys' offices before entering private practice as a lawyer in a firm with offices in Queens and Long Island.

== Political career ==
=== City Council service ===
Halloran was elected to the New York City Council from the 19th District, in Queens, on November 3, 2009, succeeding Tony Avella, who made a failed bid to become the Democratic nominee for Mayor of New York City. Halloran ran as the nominee of the Republican, Libertarian, Independence and Conservative parties. He represented nearly 200,000 residents. In September 2010, he was named one of City Hall's "40 under 40" for being a young influential member of New York City politics.

Halloran sat on the Fire & Criminal Justice, Public Safety, Land Use (including Landmarks, Public Siting & Maritime Uses sub-committee), Public Housing, and Mental Health, Mental Retardation, Alcoholism, Drug Abuse and Disability Services committees.

=== Political views ===
Dan Halloran speaks at the LibertyFest II event held September 10, 201 in New York City

Halloran is a registered Republican, a fiscal conservative and libertarian. He opposes the Patient Protection and Affordable Care Act ("ObamaCare"). He appeared as a regular commentator on the Strategy Room on Fox News where he discussed matters ranging from healthcare reform to government spending, off-shore oil exploration, and other conservative and libertarian principles.

He was purportedly asked to run for U.S. Congress in the 2010 election cycle in the 5th District of New York by Republican, Libertarian, and Conservative leaders. Despite being courted by the NRCC and Representative Peter T. King to run, he withdrew from consideration, citing the economic crisis in the New York City and state budgets and the need to set the city's finances in order before he could consider taking on a run for any other office.

Dan Halloran became the first elected official in New York City to publicly criticize the Park51 (Cordoba House) project near Ground Zero of the World Trade Center site, stating, "If we want a nation of peace... then peace comes with understanding. And they need to understand that this is sacred ground to New Yorkers." "New York City is the greatest city in the world [a place of religious tolerance, but that tolerance] starts when you say 'I understand your pain, and I am not going to inflict more on you.'

=== 2012 Congressional campaign ===
On March 26, 2012, Halloran announced that he would campaign for a vacant US Representative seat in the newly redistricted 6th congressional district. He was the only Republican nominee, and was cross-endorsed by the New York State Conservative Party and was their nominee. He was also designated by the Libertarian Party at their state convention in April 2012.

In the November 2012 general election, he lost to the Democratic candidate, Grace Meng.

In September 2014 the Federal Election Commission notified the Halloran 2012 committee of its decision to seek administrative termination of the dormant committee.

== Religion ==
Halloran's study of the Viking Age and field research in Ireland led him to develop an interest in Germanic paganism, and eventually to Theodism, which has attracted widespread attention. He is a member of the New Normannii Reik, a branch of Heathenism. The Village Voice described Halloran as "America's First Elected Heathen"; another Reconstructionist Neopagan adherent, Jessica Orsini (who is Hellenic), had previously been elected to the city council of Centralia, Missouri in 2006.

Halloran's religion became an issue during his campaign for a City Council seat after it was revealed that he was an adherent of Theodism. On his group's website, Halloran offered the following descriptions of his beliefs: "We believe in and honor the Gods and Goddesses of the North, spirits of the land, and the memories of our ancestors" and described his group as "a cultural, religious and martial organization; dedicated to reviving the folkways of the Norman peoples of Northern Europe." Odin, Tyr and Freyr are among the deities worshipped by the group. Halloran also stated that "It is our hope to reconstruct the pre-Christian religion of the Germanic branch of the Indo-European peoples, within a cultural framework and community environment."

When asked about his beliefs, Halloran said, "I was raised a Roman Catholic right here in Auburndale. I was baptized into the Catholic Church and took my confirmation at 13. I attended Jesuit schools. Then and now, faith is a cornerstone of my life." Halloran served as legal counsel and incorporating attorney for the New York City Pagan Pride Project.

State Senator Frank Padavan stated that he felt Halloran's religion should not be an issue: "We have every religion under the sun in this district... It's all here; so what? As long as everybody is properly motivated, so be it." These sentiments were echoed by the Queens County Republican Party chairman, Phil Ragusa, who additionally described Halloran as "a traditional person" and "a regular guy". Halloran lectured and discussed his theology on a national level.

The Village Voice reported on Halloran's two years in office in the paper's November 30 – December 6, 2011 edition in a report entitled "America's Top Heathen". The report pointed out that when Halloran was elected in an off-year campaign, he was the "'First Atheling' or prince, of his own Theodish tribe, called New Normandy. He had 'thralls' who swore their allegiance to him... he led his flock, about 100 people at its height, in their polytheistic celebration of the gods". However, on election night, November 4, 2009, Halloran thanked his law partner, promising, "The next time you give me advice to take a website down, I'll do it", referring to the now defunct New Normandy website, which had contained "images of Halloran in medieval garb, hoisting drinking horns and other regalia that he [Halloran] had apparently found embarrassing."

In 2013, amid the unfurling investigation into his participation in a bribery scheme, fellow Theodists confirmed that Halloran committed an unspecified offense against a female Theodist and that co-religionists punished him with 11 lashes with a belt.

== Scandals ==
=== Unsupported allegation of work slowdown ===
In December 2010, Halloran's Queens district was among many parts of New York City hit by a historic blizzard. The New York Times, among other outlets, noted the similarity of the 2010 storm to the February 1969 nor'easter which damaged the career of Mayor John Lindsay. It has long been speculated (though never confirmed) that snow removal in 1969 was due to slowdown by the of the New York City Department of Sanitation. The Sanitation workforce went on an illegal strike in 1968.

In January 2011 Halloran attracted widespread attention when he stated that five municipal employees had told him of a slowdown in clearing snow following the December 2010 North American blizzard in New York City, allegedly organized to put Mayor Michael Bloomberg in a bad light in retribution for the firings of supervisors at the Department of Sanitation. His comments precipitated multiple investigations.

In its final report on the alleged slowdown, the New York City Department of Investigation said

During the days following the December 26th blizzard, Councilman Daniel Halloran alleged in the newspapers and on television that DSNY personnel had staged and executed a slowdown. His allegations about a slowdown became a City, national and international story; investigations and hearings ensued. However, the statements given to DOI by Mr. Halloran were strongly disputed by the two DOT personnel Mr. Halloran said he spoke with about a slowdown, and Mr. Halloran asserted attorney-client privilege as to three other workers he said he spoke with from DSNY. In toto, Mr. Halloran’s information about City employee statements contributed no actual evidence about a possible slowdown.

=== Extramarital affair and Council ethics investigation ===
In 2011 Halloran's wife divorced him on grounds of extramarital affairs. The New York Post documented that Halloran spent several days a week cohabiting with a 21-year old staffer. In May 2013 the City Council referred Halloran to its Committee on Standards and Ethics for investigation of quid pro quo sexual harassment in connection with the affair.

The scandal was one of many leading Halloran to abandon his 2013 reelection campaign.

After Halloran was convicted in his corruption trial, the Committee on Standards and Ethics closed its investigation on February 26, 2015 without reaching any conclusions.

=== Federal conviction for corruption ===
On April 2, 2013, Halloran was arrested along with Democratic New York State Senator Malcolm Smith, Bronx Republican Party Chairman Joseph J. Savino, Queens Republican Party Vice Chairman Vincent Tabone, Spring Valley Mayor Noramie Jasmin, and Spring Valley Deputy Mayor Joseph Desmaret, on federal corruption charges. The complaint by the United States Attorney for the Southern District of New York and the New York FBI field office alleged that Smith attempted to secure a spot on the Republican ballot in the 2013 New York City mayoral election through a complex scheme involving the bribery of several county Republican Party leaders in New York City. As part of the scheme, Halloran allegedly facilitated the Smith bribes and also accepted over $18,000 in cash from an undercover agent and a cooperating witness. On May 1, 2013, Halloran announced that he would not seek re-election for his City Council seat.

On the eve of jury selection for Halloran's trial, his lawyers attempted to assert an insanity defense claiming that Halloran was "unable to appreciate the nature and quality or the wrongfulness of his acts" as a consequence of a benign brain tumor. The presiding judge ruled against Halloran's motion as untimely, noting that the tumor removed two years prior.

On July 29, 2014, the jury found Halloran guilty of taking bribes, orchestrating payoffs, and participating in the scheme to fix the Republican nomination for Malcolm Smith.

On March 4, 2015, Halloran was sentenced to ten years in prison for the bribery conviction and automatically disbarred from the practice of law. Halloran's request for bail while he appealed his conviction was denied. He reported to prison in Kentucky in June 2015.

His convictions were upheld by both the Southern District of New York and the United States Court of Appeals for the Second Circuit.

In 2020 the Federal Bureau of Prisons granted an early release to Halloran amid concerns about the COVID-19 pandemic.

== 2025 arrest for Child Sexual Abuse Material possession ==
Broward County Sheriff's Office booking photo of Halloran following his 2025 arrest for possessing child sexual abuse material

Halloran obtained accreditations as a scuba diving instructor by Professional Association of Diving Instructors after his release from prison.

In 2025 United States Customs and Border Protection flagged Halloran for secondary inspection when he returned to the United States through Miami International Airport following a scuba diving trip to Cuba.

According to an affidavit by a Homeland Security Investigations agent, an inspection of Halloran's iPhone revealed a folder with over a thousand files that including several videos depicting sexual abuse of prepubescent children. Searches also discovered his conversations on Telegram messenger with an individual selling files. The affidavit states that Halloran confessed to ownership of the iPhone and the child sexual abuse material on it. He was arrested and booked at Broward County Main Jail and then held to Federal Detention Center, Miami. Halloran posted bail shortly thereafter.

A grand jury later indicted Halloran on charges of possession and transportation of child pornography. Halloran plead not guilty, and as of October 2026 is seeking suppression of evidence on grounds of his Fourth and Fifth Amendment rights.

Following discovery, October 2026 Halloran's defense made a pretrial filing that revealed that federal law enforcement had “previously investigated [Halloran] for downloading and distributing child pornography in 2010". The New York Daily News noted that this was while Halloran was a Council Member. Halloran's defense argued that the lookout had expired, and was not the stated cause of the secondary search raising questions about "the true genesis and good faith, or lack thereof, of Mr. Halloran’s selection and detention".

Political offices
Preceded by Tony Avella	New York City Council, District 19; 2010–2013	Succeeded by Paul Vallone
