= Peter Koo =

American politician

- 顧雅明
- Koo in 2008

Member of the New York City Council from the 20th district
- In office January 1, 2010 – December 31, 2021
- Preceded by: John Liu
- Succeeded by: Sandra Ung

Personal details
- Born: September 5, 1952 (age 74) Shanghai, China
- Party: Republican (Prior to 2012); Democratic (Since 2012)
- Spouse: Bernadette Ching Koo
- Children: 2
- Education: New Mexico College of Pharmacy
- Website: Official website

Peter Koo
- Traditional Chinese: 顧雅明
- Simplified Chinese: 顾雅明
Transcriptions
Standard Mandarin
- Hanyu Pinyin: Gù Yǎmíng
Yue: Cantonese
- Jyutping: gu3 ngaa5 ming4

Peter Ah-Ming Koo (born September 5, 1952) is a Chinese American politician who represented the 20th district of the New York City Council from 2010 to 2021. He is a Democrat. The district includes portions of Bayside, College Point, Flushing, Flushing Meadows Corona Park, Fresh Meadows and Whitestone in Queens.

Koo and Manhattan Council member Margaret Chin comprise the Asian-American delegation of the council.

== Life and career ==
Koo is a Chinese American born in Shanghai in 1952. Prior to immigrating to the United States in 1971, he lived in the former British Hong Kong. Graduating from the University of New Mexico College of Pharmacy in 1975 where he paid his way through by working minimum wage jobs at Kentucky Fried Chicken and Dunkin' Donuts, Koo is a pharmacist who developed a five-store chain of pharmacies called Starside Drugs Pharmacy.

He has been a member of Queens Community Board 7. Previously, he unsuccessfully challenged local state senator Toby Ann Stavisky in 2008. He has been called the "Mayor" of Flushing.

In January 2012, Koo changed his party affiliation from Republican to Democratic.

In 2018, Koo proposed legislation before being term limited out of The New York City Council to ban smoking cigarettes while walking.

== New York City Council ==
Koo was elected to the city council seat on November 3, 2009, defeating Democratic Party nominee Yen Chou, Working Families Party nominee S.J. Jung, and Green Party nominee Evergreen Chou. He assumed the position that was held by John Liu, the New York City Comptroller. He was term limited out of office at the end of 2021.

Election history
Location	Year	Election	Results
NY Senate District 16	2008	General	√ Toby Ann Stavisky (D) 69.44% Peter Koo (R) 30.56%
NYC Council District 20	2009	General	√ Peter Koo (R) 49.05% Yen S. Chou (D) 45.24% S.J. Jung (Working Families) 4.06% Evergreen Chou (Green) 1.64%
NYC Council District 20	2013	General	√ Peter Koo (D) 79.67% Martha Flores-Vazqeuz (Jobs & Education) 10.38% Sunny Hahn (Reform) 6.40% Evergreen Chou (Green) 3.38%
NYC Council District 20	2017	Primary	√ Peter Koo 57.9% Alison Tan 41.67%

Koo serves on the following New York City Council committees:

- Consumer Affairs and Business Licensing
- Economic Development
- Land Use
  - Landmarks, Public Siting, and Maritime Uses (subcommittee of Land Use Committee)
- Parks and Recreation
- Technology (He serves as chair of this committee.)
- Transportation

Caucuses

- Black, Latino/a, and Asian Caucus

== Personal life ==
Peter has been married for 26 years and has two children, a boy and a girl.

== See also ==
- Hong Kong Americans in New York City

Political offices
Preceded by John Liu	New York City Council, 20th district 2010–2021	Succeeded by Sandra Ung
