= Sandra Ung =

American politician (born 1974)

- 黃敏儀
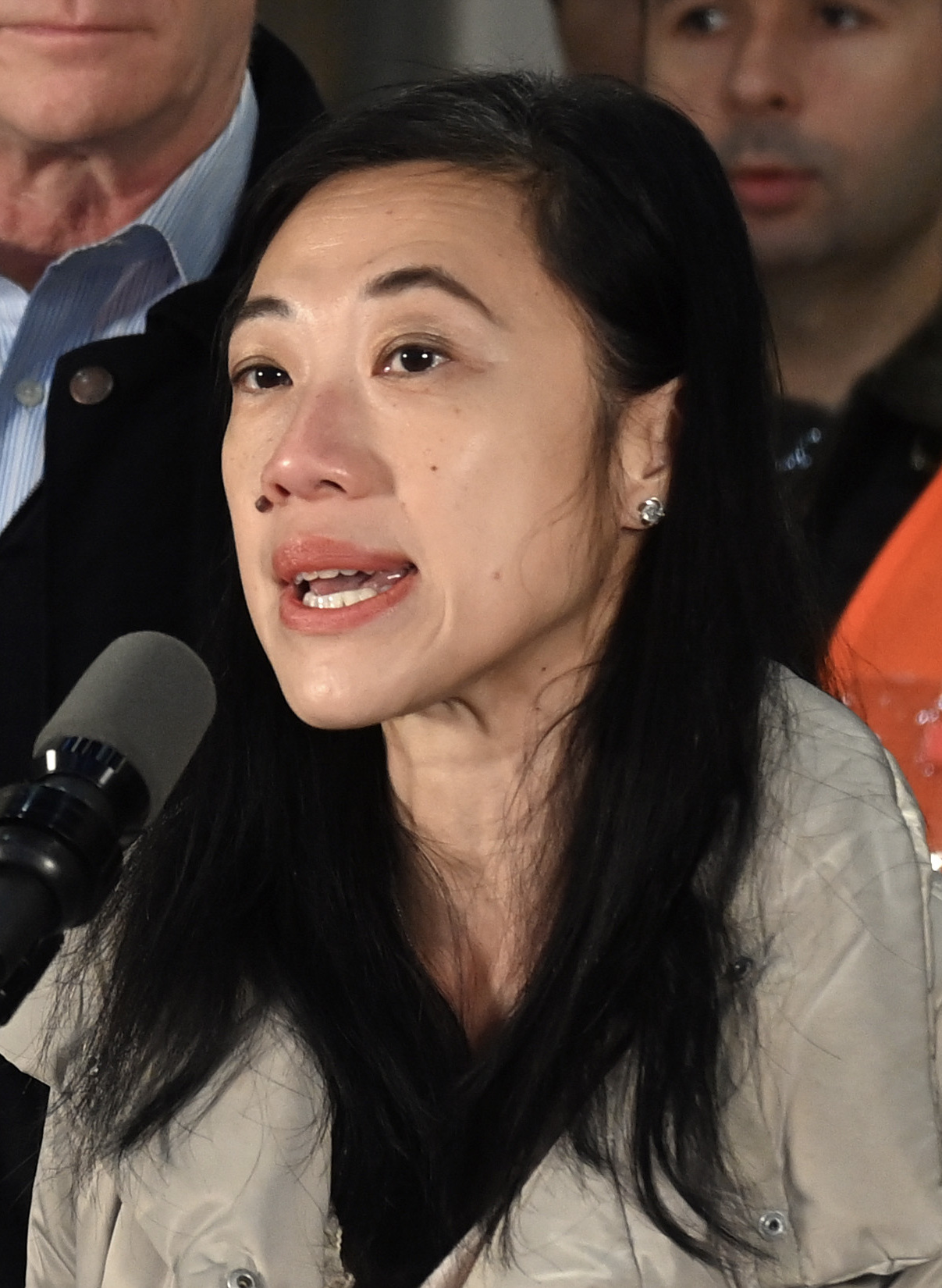

Member of the New York City Council from the 20th district
- Incumbent
- Assumed office January 1, 2022
- Preceded by: Peter Koo

Personal details
- Born: September 9, 1974 (age 52) Cambodia
- Party: Democratic
- Education: Hunter College (BA); Columbia University (JD)
- Website: Official website Campaign website

Chinese name
- Traditional Chinese: 黃敏儀
- Simplified Chinese: 黄敏仪
Transcriptions
Standard Mandarin
- Hanyu Pinyin: Huáng Mǐn Yí

Sandra Ung (Chinese: 黃敏儀, born September 9, 1974) is an American attorney and politician from New York City. She is a member of the New York City Council for the 20th district, which is based in Flushing, Queens.

== Early life and education ==
Ung was born in Cambodia to ethnically Chinese Cambodian parents. Her family fled to Taiwan soon after she was born to escape the Cambodian genocide, and immigrated to the United States when Ung was seven years old.

After growing up in Flushing, Queens, Ung attended Hunter College for her undergraduate degree, and went on to receive her J.D. from Columbia Law School in 2001.

== Career ==
Prior to seeking elected office, Ung held a number of jobs in and around New York politics, among them chief of staff to Assemblyman (and father to Grace Meng) Jimmy Meng, legislative assistant to City Comptrollers Bill Thompson and John Liu, and most recently special assistant to Congresswoman Meng. She has also worked as a practicing attorney at the firm Dorsey & Whitney.

=== 2021 City Council campaign ===
In July 2020, Ung announced she would run as a Democrat for the 20th district of the New York City Council, held by term-limited incumbent Peter Koo, in 2021. She received influential endorsements from the Queens Democratic Party and Congresswoman Meng, and was among the top fundraisers in City Council races across the city, cementing her as the race's frontrunner.

In an effort to overcome Ung's advantages, seven of her opponents in the race formed a coalition together in May 2021, with each candidate encouraging their voters to rank other non-Ung candidates on their ranked-choice ballots. The seven ran on significantly different platforms–among them were John Choe, the race's most left-wing candidate, and Neng Wang, its most conservative–but argued that they were united against the Queens Democratic Party's influence.

Ung nevertheless emerged with a lead on election night in June, receiving 24 percent of first-choice votes. When absentee ballots and ranked-choice votes were counted two weeks later, she defeated former Assemblywoman Ellen Young 55-45%; she formally declared victory on July 7. Ung easily won the November general election in the strongly Democratic district.

=== City Council Tenure ===
Inaugurated in January, 2022, Ung was named as the Chair of the Committee on Government Operations for her first term in the City Council. The Committee has jurisdiction over Federal and State legislation (including Home Rule requests), municipal governmental structure and organization, and includes several important city agencies including New York City's Department of Citywide Administrative Services, Office of Administrative Trials and Hearings, Board of Elections, Board of Standards and Appeals, Campaign Finance Board, Commission on Public Information and Communication, Community Boards, Department of Records and Information Services, Financial Services Agency, and the Law Department.

As Chair, Ung held several oversight hearings on the city's elections, including on public campaign financing of elections. Ung also held hearings on New York City's Civic Engagement Commission and on NYC's Community Boards.

In her first term, Ung introduced 29 bills and resolutions, 12 of which passed during the City Council's 2022-2023 term. Ung's bills included a bill requiring the Board of Elections to redesign ballots to make it more clear for speakers of a language other than English, two bills that improved the 311 call experience for LEP (Limited English Proficiency) New Yorkers and a bill requiring the Department of Transportation to report on potential locations for the construction of a bus transit center in Flushing. Ung also passed several resolutions, including one calling for Lunar New Year to be made a federal holiday and one calling on the New York State Legislature to expand financial relief programs to assist New Yorkers struggling to pay their utility bills.

In her 2024 term, Ung was appointed to be the Chair of the Committee on Standards and Ethics. Ung was also appointed to the Leadership team of the Council, which works with the Council Speaker to steer the legislative body's priorities, and the Budget Negotiations Team, which negotiates the city's budget with the mayoral administration.

Ung voted against The City of Yes legislation in December 2024. The bill passed with almost a majority vote. It paves the way for the conversion and construction of 80,000 new and legal housing units within the 5 boroughs of New York for middle income and low income families and households. The bill awaits Mayor Adam's signature.

== Personal life ==
Ung lives in Flushing where she is the primary caretaker for her mother. Ung is a marathon runner, having completed the New York City marathon.

== Home Healthcare Workers ==
In 2022, home healthcare workers organized a protest outside of Sandra Ung's City Council district office demanding that she support city legislation (called The No More 24 Act) limiting the number of hours that home healthcare aides can work in a day. They want their employers to limit their work schedule to 12 hours a day and 50 hours a week. Many of these workers provide care for 24 consecutive hours. This protest was organized by the Flushing Workers Center. The City Council Speaker's office said that the legislative efforts on the City Council level were misdirected because home health care is funded primarily through Medicaid, which is managed at the state level. Council Member Ung wants the non-profit employers to hire more home healthcare workers and wants the State of New York to make adjustments to the Medicare reimbursement policy so that patients who need attentive care are not left unattended. Council Member Ung called the current system unjust and held a rally with SEIU 1199 homecare workers, union representatives and disability activists calling on the state government end 24-hour shifts and provide funding to split them into 2, 12-hour shifts.

== Eastern Queens Greenway ==
As a council member, Ung has directed funding to the Eastern Queens Greenway section of the Brooklyn–Queens Greenway on multiple occasions, including $6 million in 2023 and $11.9 million in 2024. Additionally she has questioned the Parks Commissioner on capital projects costs and timelines after long delays between her funding and the projects construction.

== Electoral history ==
=== 2025 ===
2025 New York City Council election, District 20
| Party | Candidate | Votes | % |
|---|---|---|---|
| Democratic | Sandra Ung (incumbent) | 15,243 | 75.5 |
| Conservative | Allen Haolun Wang | 3,371 | 16.7 |
| Asians United/F.A.F.O. | Joseph J. Chou | 898 | 4.4 |
| Patriot Party | Steven Wang | 619 | 3.1 |
| Write-in | | 70 | 0.3 |
| Total votes | | 20,201 | 100.0 |
| Democratic hold | | | |

=== 2023 ===
2023 New York City Council election, District 20
| Party | Candidate | Votes | % |
|---|---|---|---|
| Democratic | Sandra Ung (incumbent) | 5,087 | 57.8 |
| Republican | Yu-Ching James Pai (Note: Shared with "Medical Freedom" ballot line.) | 2,524 | 28.7 |
| Conservative | Yu-Ching James Pai (Note: Shared with "Common Sense" ballot line.) | 275 | 3.1 |
| Total | Yu-Ching James Pai | 2,799 | 31.8 |
| Better Flushing | Jin Liang Chen | 863 | 9.8 |
| Write-in | | 49 | 0.6 |
| Total votes | | 8,798 | 100.0 |
| Democratic hold | | | |

=== 2021 ===
2021 New York City Council Democratic primary, District 20
| Party | Candidate | Maximum round | Maximum votes | Share in maximum round | Maximum votes First round votes Transfer votes |
|---|---|---|---|---|---|
| Democratic | Sandra Ung | 8 | 4,205 | 55.2% | |
| Democratic | Ellen Young | 8 | 3,406 | 44.8% | |
| Democratic | Neng Wang | 7 | 2,146 | 25.2% | |
| Democratic | John Choe | 6 | 1,845 | 20.2% | |
| Democratic | Anthony Miranda | 5 | 1,550 | 15.9% | |
| Democratic | Hailing Chen | 4 | 1,337 | 12.8% | |
| Democratic | Dao Yin | 3 | 968 | 9.1% | |
| Democratic | Ming-Kang Low | 2 | 50 | 0.5% | |
| Write-In | | 1 | 13 | 0.1% | |

2021 New York City Council election, District 20
| Party | Candidate | Votes | % |
|---|---|---|---|
| Democratic | Sandra Ung | 7,718 | 59.3 |
| Republican | Yu-Ching James Pai (Note: Shared with "Save Our City" ballot line.) | 4,781 | 36.7 |
| Conservative | Yu-Ching James Pai | 487 | 3.7 |
| Total | Yu-Ching James Pai | 5,268 | 40.5 |
| Write-in | | 35 | 0.3 |
| Total votes | | 13,021 | 100.0 |
| Democratic hold | | | |

== Notes ==
Political offices
| Preceded by Peter Koo | Member of the New York City Council from the 20th district 2022–present | Incumbent |
