= Tony Avella =

American politician

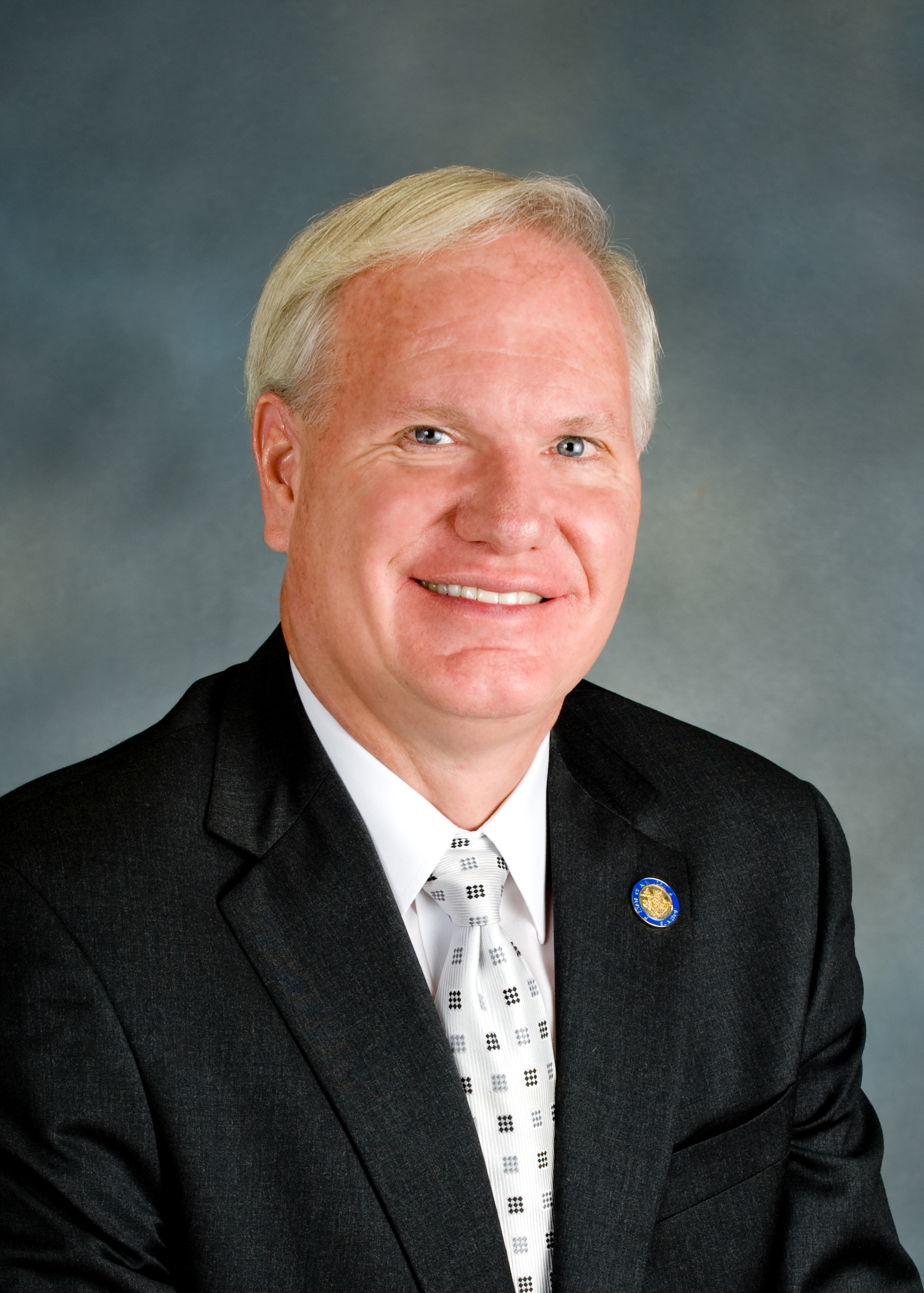

Member of the New York Senate from the 11th district
- In office January 1, 2011 – December 31, 2018
- Preceded by: Frank Padavan
- Succeeded by: John Liu

Member of the New York City Council from the 19th district
- In office January 1, 2002 – December 31, 2009
- Preceded by: Michael Abel
- Succeeded by: Dan Halloran

Personal details
- Born: October 27, 1951 (age 75) New York City, New York, U.S.
- Party: Democratic
- Other political affiliations: Independent Democratic Conference (2014–2018)
- Spouse: Judith Cashman
- Education: Hunter College (BA)

Anthony Avella Jr. (born October 27, 1951) is an American politician. A member of the Democratic Party, he represented the New York State Senate's 11th district in northeast Queens from 2011 to 2019. The district included the mostly affluent neighborhoods of College Point, Whitestone, Bayside, Little Neck, Douglaston, Floral Park, Beechhurst, Malba and Auburndale. Avella also served as a member of the New York City Council from 2002 to 2009, representing some of the same Queens neighborhoods in District 19. Avella is a former member of the Independent Democratic Conference (IDC), a group of Democratic state senators who allied themselves with Senate Republicans. He was also a losing candidate in the 2009 New York City mayoral election, the 2013 Queens Borough President election, and the 2017 New York City mayoral election.

On September 13, 2018, Avella was defeated in the State Senate Democratic primary by former New York City Comptroller John Liu. Avella continued his campaign on third-party lines and was again defeated by Liu in the general election.

== Early life, education, and family ==
Avella earned a bachelor's degree in Political Science from Hunter College of the City University of New York. His public service career began as an aide to New York City Council member Peter Vallone, Sr. He served as an aide to Mayors Ed Koch and David Dinkins, and as Special Assistant to late State Senator Leonard P. Stavisky and Chief to Staff to his widow, Toby Stavisky, who succeeded Leonard as a State Senator after his death. Avella also served as a member of Queens Community Board 7 and a Democratic District Leader and joined several civic and recreational associations.

A lifelong Queens resident, Avella resides in Whitestone with his wife, Judith Cashman.

== Political career ==
=== New York City Council ===
In 2001, Avella was first elected to the New York City Council in Queens' District 19. He was the first Democrat elected to his relatively conservative district. Avella served as the Chair of the Zoning and Franchises Subcommittee and was a member of five other Council committees: Higher Education, Housing and Buildings, Fire and Criminal Justice Services, Land Use, and Veterans. He was the founder and Chair of the first Italian American Caucus of the Council. He turned down a stipend and pay increase that came with his committee chairship, and was also the only City Council member to turn down his complementary parking placard. His colleagues often noted his aggressive, zealous demeanor. Avella was labeled both conservative and progressive for his varying views.

In 2005, Avella forwarded a bill proposing that the Department of Transportation increase the operational duration of four public bus companies operating in his area. The bill would allow for the smooth integration of the private lines with the MTA and was signed into law in May 2005.

=== 2009 campaign for Mayor of New York City ===
In 2009, the City Council passed legislation extending officeholder term limits from two terms to three at Mayor Michael Bloomberg's request, a decision Avella criticized. He opted not to run for a third term, instead running for mayor of New York City. He received publicity for his stances in favor of animal rights, commercial rent control for small businesses and against overdevelopment and Mayor Bloomberg's rezonings. In the Democratic primary election, Avella was defeated by New York City Comptroller Bill Thompson, coming in second place with 21% of the vote to Thompson's 71%.

=== New York State Senate ===
In the 2010 elections, Avella ran for the 11th district of the New York State Senate, covering some of the same areas as his former City Council seat. On November 2, 2010, Avella defeated Frank Padavan, the 38-year Republican incumbent, winning 53-47%. Avella, running on a campaign of independence and reform in Albany, received the endorsement of the powerful United Federation of Teachers, the first time it endorsed a challenger in lieu of an incumbent.

The freshman senator was appointed ranking member of the Cities and Environmental Conservation Committees, and has at various points served on the Education, Aging, Banking, and Veterans, Homeland Security, Military Affairs Committees, Children and Families, Social Services, Cultural Affairs, Elections, Environmental Conservation, Finance, Housing, Transportation, and Libraries Select Committees, as well the Senate Task Force on the Delivery of Social Services to New York City. He was also a ranking member of the Aging Committee.

On November 26, 2012, Avella announced he would enter the race for Queens Borough President. On August 14, 2013, he dropped out of the race.

In February 2014, Avella joined the Independent Democratic Conference, a group of senate Democrats that allied themselves with the Senate Republican Conference, creating a coalition that controlled the Senate. At the time, Democrats held a numerical majority in the Senate, but the IDC-Republican coalition prevented Democrats from holding power, while allowing Avella and other IDC members to gain committee chairships. For joining the majority coalition, Avella could potentially gain committee leadership positions and associated stipends, though he said he would turn down stipends, which he also did during his tenure in the City Council. Avella was soon named Chair of the Committee on Social Services and in 2015 was named Chair of the Committee on Children and Families.

In September 2014, former New York City Comptroller John Liu challenged Avella in the Democratic primary for State Senate District 11; Avella and Liu had previously served together in the City Council, representing neighboring districts, and the two had a strained relationship. Avella ultimately won with 52% of the vote to Liu's 47%. Liu criticized Avella for joining the IDC; Avella criticized Liu over the latter's campaign finance scandal that saw two of Liu's aides convicted, Liu's failure to pay fines from his earlier campaign for Comptroller, and Liu's record as Comptroller. Liu was initially supported by the Working Families Party, by the Queens County Democratic Party and by several unions, but these organizations largely dropped their support of Liu when Jeff Klein, leader of the Independent Democratic Conference, announced that its members would rejoin the Senate Democratic Conference after the 2014 elections. After Republicans gained an outright majority in the State Senate in the 2014 elections, the IDC continued to caucus with the Republicans.

In April 2018, Avella and his IDC colleagues rejoined the Senate Democratic Conference. Subsequently, the Republican conference stripped Avella of his position as Chair of the Committee on Children and Families.

Despite the dissolution of the IDC, Liu once again challenged Avella in the September 2018 Democratic primary election. In a reversal of their 2014 race, Avella lost with 47% of the vote to Liu's 53%, attributed to long-simmering anger at the former members of the Independent Democratic Conference. Unlike in 2014, the Queens County Democratic Party endorsed Avella instead of Liu. Avella appeared in the November 6, 2018 general election as the third-party candidate for the Independence Party of New York and the Women's Equality Party. Avella announced in October 2018 that he would continue his campaign. In the November 2018 general election, Avella came in third place with 21% of the vote, defeated again by Liu, who won 54% of the vote, and by Republican candidate Vickie Paladino, who won 24% of the vote, while finishing ahead of Conservative Party candidate Simon Minching, who won 1% of the vote.

=== 2013 campaign for Queens Borough President ===
On November 26, 2012, Avella announced he would enter the race for Queens Borough President. On August 14, 2013, he dropped out of the race.

=== 2021 campaign for City Council (and 2023 NYC Council Election) ===
In August 2019, Avella registered a committee to run for the same New York City Council seat he held from 2002 to 2009. On June 23, 2021, Avella won the Democratic primary for the seat. As this was the first election to use ranked-choice voting in New York City, final results were not certified until July 20. Avella won 38.1% of the votes in the first round of voting and ended with 54.7% of the votes that continued into the fourth and final round. On November 2, 2021, Avella was defeated in the general election by Republican Vickie Paladino. Due to the 2020 Census, another New York City Council election cycle had to occur in 2023 because the council district lines were redrawn. Avella again lost to Paladino on Election Day 2023.

Political offices
Preceded by Michael Abel	Member of the New York City Council from the 19th district 2002–2009	Succeeded by Dan Halloran
New York State Senate
Preceded by Frank Padavan	Member of the New York State Senate from the 11th district 2011–2018	Succeeded by John Liu
