= Michael Abel =

American politician (1950–2025)

Michael J. Abel

Member of the New York City Council from the 19th district
- In office 1992–2001
- Preceded by: District created
- Succeeded by: Tony Avella

Minority Leader of the New York City Council
- In office March 1994 – November 1994
- Preceded by: Alfred C. Cerullo III
- Succeeded by: Thomas Ognibene

Personal details
- Born: August 24, 1950 Queens, New York City, U.S.
- Died: November 13, 2025 (aged 75)
- Party: Republican
- Children: 4
- Education: Fordham University (BA)
- Occupation: Politician, businessman

Michael J. Abel (August 24, 1950 – November 13, 2025) was an American politician and businessman from Queens, New York. A Republican, he served in the New York City Council from 1992 to 2001, representing the 19th district, which includes neighborhoods such as Bayside, Whitestone, College Point, Little Neck, Douglaston, Beechhurst, Malba, and Auburndale. He also served as council minority leader for a brief period in 1994.

== Early life and career ==
Abel attended Blessed Sacrament School and Holy Cross High School before graduating from Fordham University in 1972 with a bachelor's degree in theater.

After college, Abel opened a Midas Muffler franchise in the South Bronx and later in New Jersey. He operated the business for about 20 years before becoming a legislative aide to Assemblyman Douglas Prescott (R-Bayside), where he handled constituent complaints.

Abel served as the Queens campaign coordinator for Rudolph Giuliani's unsuccessful 1989 mayoral bid.

== New York City Council ==
In 1991, a new City Council seat was created in northeast Queens as part of an expansion of the Council. Abel ran for the open seat and won the Republican primary, which he credited with giving him enough exposure to win the general election. He took office in 1992, becoming the first person to represent the newly drawn 19th district.

During his tenure, Abel focused on securing funding for schools, parks, and libraries. He obtained more than $5 million for his district in his final budget, including funds for technology upgrades in schools, park renovations, and library improvements. He also secured funding for the preservation of open space at Udall's Cove. One of his early accomplishments was a crackdown on drag racing on Francis Lewis Boulevard, which he achieved through a joint effort with the Police Department and the district attorney.

Abel was one of only three Republicans in the City Council at the time.

=== Minority leader ===
In February 1994, Councilman Alfred C. Cerullo III stepped down as minority leader to become Commissioner of Consumer Affairs. Abel and Councilman Thomas V. Ognibene competed for the position. Abel had the backing of the more liberal Manhattan Republicans, Charles Millard and Andrew S. Eristoff, while Ognibene had the support of more conservative members. After a stalemate, Abel won with the intervention of Mayor Giuliani, whose deputy mayor rebuffed Ognibene's candidacy due to his ties to the Conservative Party.

However, Abel's tenure as minority leader was short-lived. In November 1994, Ognibene gathered the signatures of four of the seven Republican Council members to declare himself the new minority leader. Abel challenged the ouster in court, arguing that his term was to run through 1997, but a state Supreme Court justice dismissed the lawsuit, ruling that no fixed tenure had been established.

=== 2001 borough president race ===
With term limits preventing him from seeking a third Council term, Abel announced his candidacy for Queens borough president in November 1999. He cited the need for a better census count, new housing, and more schools as key issues. However, he struggled to raise funds and withdrew from the race in March 2001, citing a lack of boroughwide political support.

== Post-Council career ==
After leaving office in December 2001, Abel remained unemployed for several weeks and expressed interest in a job with Mayor Michael Bloomberg's new administration or in the private sector. He also considered running for higher office in the future.

== Death ==
Abel died on November 13, 2025, at the age of 75. He was remembered for securing large city investments in parks and schools.

Political offices
| Preceded by District created | New York City Council, 19th district 1992–2001 | Succeeded by Tony Avella |
| Preceded by Alfred Cerullo | Minority Leader, New York City Council; March 1994 – November 1994 | Succeeded by Thomas Ognibene |
