= New York City's 19th City Council district =

- Boundaries following the 2020 census

Government
  - Councilmember: Vickie Paladino (R—Whitestone)

Population (2010)
  - Total: 155,237

Demographics
  - White: 53%
  - Asian: 28%
  - Hispanic: 15%
  - Black: 2%
  - Other: 2%

Registration
  - Democratic: 49.9%
  - Republican: 20.3%
  - No party preference: 25.9%
- Registered voters (2021) 100,032

New York City's 19th City Council district is one of 51 districts in the New York City Council. It is currently represented by Republican Vickie Paladino, who took office in 2022.

== Geography ==
District 19 covers neighborhoods along the shoreline of far eastern Queens, including Auburndale, College Point, Whitestone, Bay Terrace, Beechhurst, and parts of Flushing, Bayside, and Douglaston–Little Neck.

The district overlaps with Queens Community Boards 7 and 11, and with New York's 3rd, 6th, and 14th congressional districts. It also overlaps with the 11th and 16th districts of the New York State Senate, and with the 25th, 26th, 27th, and 40th districts of the New York State Assembly.

== Recent election results ==
=== 2025 ===
2025 New York City Council election, District 19
Primary election
| Party | Candidate | Votes | % |
|---|---|---|---|
| Democratic | Benjamin Chou | 7,731 | 66.8 |
| Democratic | Alexander Caruso | 3,775 | 32.6 |
| Write-in | | 69 | 0.6 |
| Total votes | | 11,575 | 100.0 |
General election
| Republican | Vickie Paladino | 22,417 | |
| Conservative | Vickie Paladino | 2,453 | |
| Total | Vickie Paladino (incumbent) | 24,870 | 57.3 |
| Democratic | Benjamin Chou | 18,496 | 42.6 |
| Write-in | | 32 | 0.1 |
| Total votes | | 43,398 | 100.0 |
| Republican hold | | | |

=== 2023 (redistricting) ===
Due to redistricting and the 2020 changes to the New York City Charter, councilmembers elected during the 2021 and 2023 City Council elections will serve two-year terms, with full four-year terms resuming after the 2025 New York City Council elections.

2023 New York City Council election, District 19 Democratic primary
| Party | Candidate | Maximum round | Maximum votes | Share in maximum round | Maximum votes First round votes Transfer votes |
|---|---|---|---|---|---|
| Democratic | Tony Avella | 3 | 2,870 | 51.1% | |
| Democratic | Christopher Bae | 3 | 2,746 | 48.9% | |
| Democratic | Paul Graziano | 2 | 1,440 | 24.0% | |
| Write-in | | 1 | 34 | 0.6% | |

2023 New York City Council election, District 19 general election
| Party | Candidate | Votes | % |
|---|---|---|---|
| Republican | Vickie Paladino | 10,700 | |
| Conservative | Vickie Paladino | 1,161 | |
| Total | Vickie Paladino (incumbent) | 11,861 | 59.9 |
| Democratic | Tony Avella | 7,646 | |
| Taxpayers Unite | Tony Avella | 214 | |
| Total | Tony Avella | 7,860 | 39.7 |
| Write-in | | 70 | 0.4 |
| Total votes | | 19,791 | 100 |
| Republican hold | | | |

=== 2021 ===
In 2019, voters in New York City approved Ballot Question 1, which implemented ranked-choice voting in all local elections. Under the new system, voters have the option to rank up to five candidates for every local office. Voters whose first-choice candidates fare poorly will have their votes redistributed to other candidates in their ranking until one candidate surpasses the 50 percent threshold. If one candidate surpasses 50 percent in first-choice votes, then ranked-choice tabulations will not occur.

2021 New York City Council election, District 19 Democratic primary
| Party | Candidate | Maximum round | Maximum votes | Share in maximum round | Maximum votes First round votes Transfer votes |
|---|---|---|---|---|---|
| Democratic | Tony Avella | 4 | 6,429 | 54.7% | |
| Democratic | Richard Lee | 4 | 5,317 | 45.3% | |
| Democratic | Austin Shafran | 3 | 2,939 | 23.2% | |
| Democratic | Adriana Aviles | 2 | 1,058 | 8.1% | |
| Democratic | Frank Spangenberg | 2 | 378 | 2.9% | |
| Democratic | Nabaraj KC | 2 | 186 | 1.4% | |
| Write-in | | 1 | 69 | 0.5% | |

An interactive map of District 19

2021 New York City Council election, District 19 Republican primary, Conservative primary & general election
Primary election
| Party | Candidate | Votes | % |
|---|---|---|---|
| Republican | Vickie Paladino | 1,765 | 51.6 |
| Republican | John-Alexander Sakelos | 1,608 | 47.0 |
| Write-in | | 47 | 1.4 |
| Total votes | | 3,420 | 100 |
| Conservative | John-Alexander Sakelos | 107 | 88.4 |
| Conservative | Dawn Anatra | 10 | 8.3 |
| Write-in | | 4 | 3.3 |
| Total votes | | 121 | 100 |
General election
| Republican | Vickie Paladino | 12,325 | |
| Independent | Vickie Paladino | 465 | |
| Total | Vickie Paladino | 12,790 | 47.1 |
| Democratic | Tony Avella | 12,400 | 45.7 |
| Conservative | John-Alexander Sakelos | 1,641 | |
| Save Our City | John-Alexander Sakelos | 216 | |
| Total | John-Alexander Sakelos | 1,857 | 6.8 |
| Write-in | | 71 | 0.4 |
| Total votes | | 27,118 | 100 |
| Republican gain from Democratic | | | |

=== 2017 ===
2017 New York City Council election, District 19
Primary election
| Party | Candidate | Votes | % |
|---|---|---|---|
| Democratic | Paul Vallone (incumbent) | 3,192 | 55.1 |
| Democratic | Paul Graziano | 2,596 | 44.8 |
| Write-in | | 10 | 0.1 |
| Total votes | | 5,798 | 100 |
General election
| Democratic | Paul Vallone | 13,779 | |
| Working Families | Paul Vallone | 1,210 | |
| Total | Paul Vallone (incumbent) | 14,989 | 57.8 |
| Republican | Konstantinos Poulidis | 6,347 | 24.5 |
| Reform | Paul Graziano | 4,555 | 17.6 |
| Write-in | | 20 | 0.1 |
| Total votes | | 25,911 | 100 |
| Democratic hold | | | |

=== 2013 ===
2013 New York City Council election, District 19
Primary election
| Party | Candidate | Votes | % |
|---|---|---|---|
| Democratic | Paul Vallone | 2,922 | 31.2 |
| Democratic | Austin Shafran | 2,728 | 29.1 |
| Democratic | Paul Graziano | 1,602 | 17.1 |
| Democratic | John Duane | 1,164 | 12.4 |
| Democratic | Chrissy Voskerichian | 963 | 10.3 |
| Write-in | | 0 | 0.0 |
| Total votes | | 9,379 | 100 |
General election
| Democratic | Paul Vallone | 12,752 | |
| Independence | Paul Vallone | 610 | |
| Total | Paul Vallone | 13,362 | 57.1 |
| Republican | Dennis Saffran | 8,178 | |
| Conservative | Dennis Saffran | 1,469 | |
| Reform | Dennis Saffran | 318 | |
| Total | Dennis Saffran | 9,965 | 42.6 |
| Write-in | | 57 | 0.3 |
| Total votes | | 23,384 | 100 |
| Democratic gain from Republican | | | |
