= Frank Padavan =

American politician

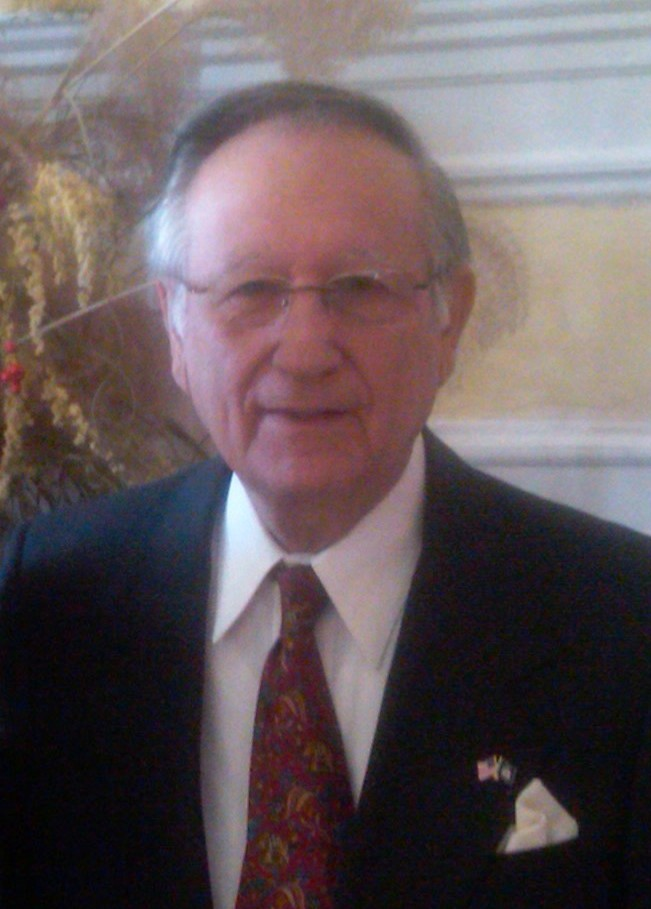
- Padavan in 2011

Member of the New York State Senate from the 11th district
- In office January 3, 1973 – December 31, 2010
- Preceded by: Murray Schwartz (redistricting)
- Succeeded by: Tony Avella

Personal details
- Born: October 31, 1934 Brooklyn, New York, U.S.
- Died: October 8, 2018 (aged 83) New York, New York, U.S.
- Party: Republican

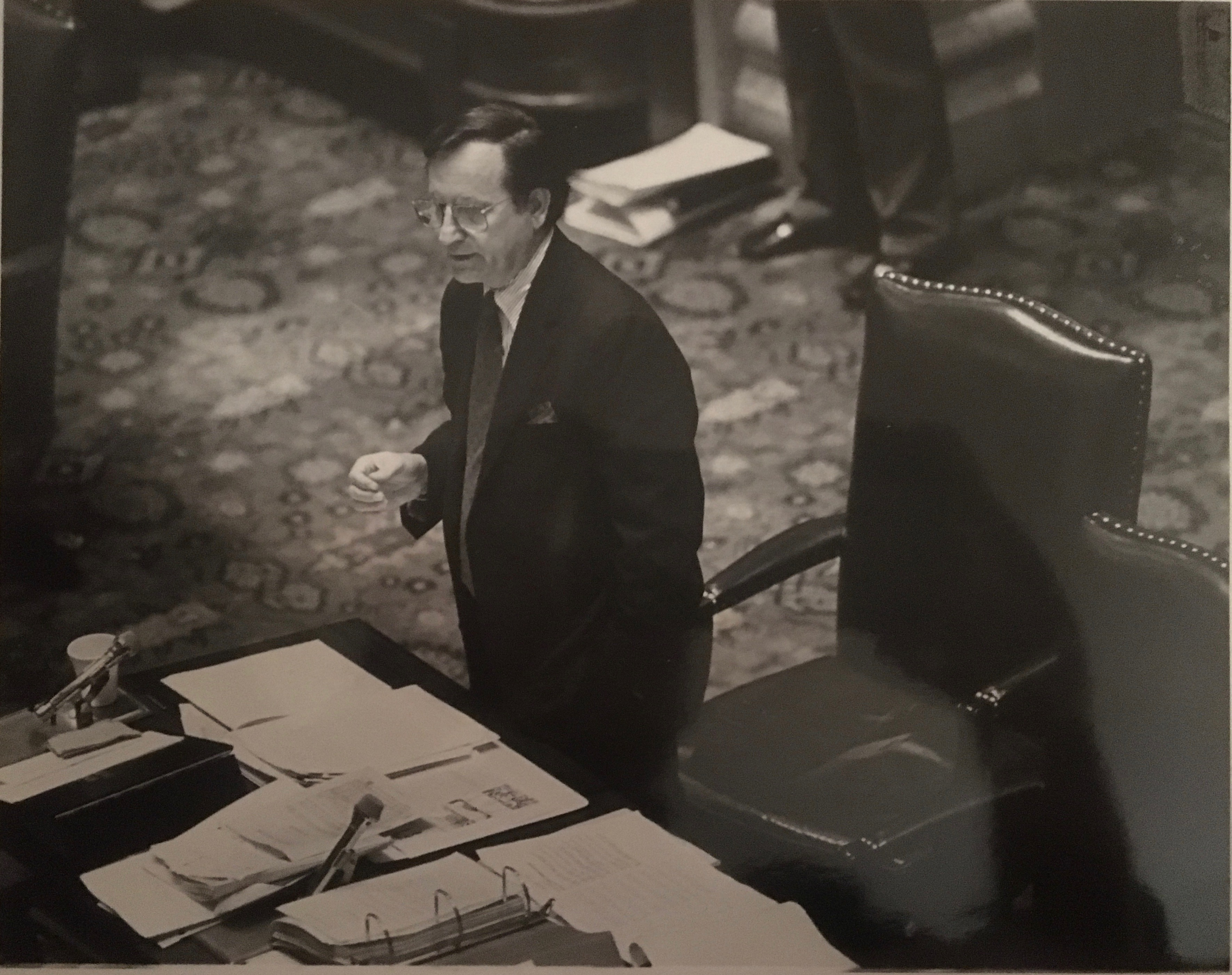

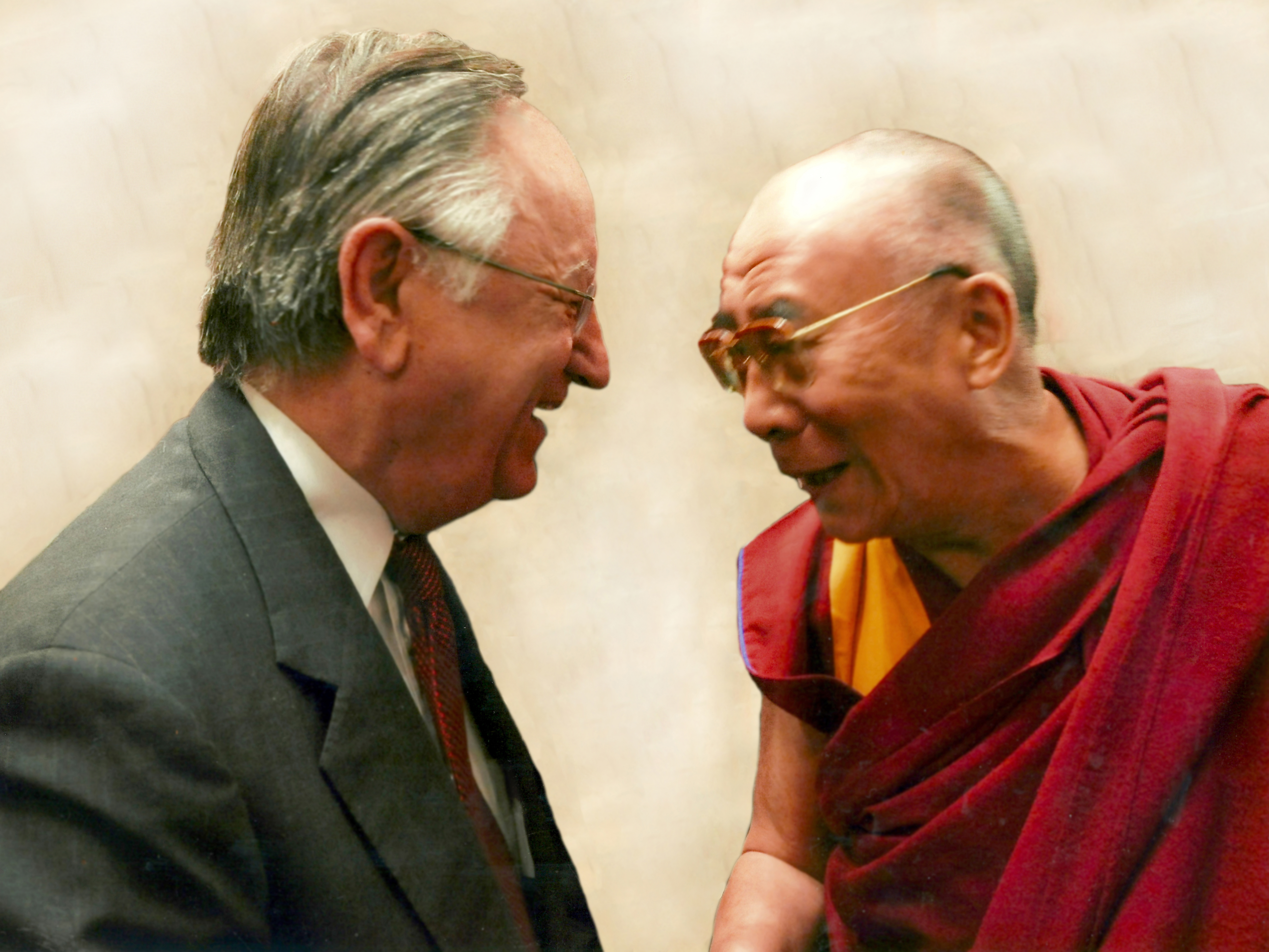

Frank Padavan (October 31, 1934 – October 8, 2018) was an American engineer and politician. He served as a New York state senator representing District 11, located in Queens County. His district included the communities of Queens Village, Flushing, Bayside, Whitestone, Douglaston, Little Neck, College Point, Bellerose, Hollis, Jamaica Estates, Floral Park, and Glen Oaks. A Republican, Padavan lost his 2010 bid for re-election to Democrat Tony Avella.

== Life and career ==
Frank Padavan was born in Brooklyn, New York and raised in Hollis, Queens.

He attended Newtown High School in Elmhurst, New York. He received his undergraduate degree in electrical engineering from Brooklyn Polytechnic Institute in 1956, and went on to receive an M.B.A. from New York University in 1963. Between 1955 and 1968, he worked as an engineer at Westinghouse Electric Corporation.

Padavan spent 30 years as a reserve member of the U.S. Army Corps of Engineers, attaining the rank of colonel. During his military career, Padavan served as commanding officer of the 411th Engineer Brigade and chief of staff, 77th ARCOM, headquarters for New York State's Army Reserve. He was a graduate of the United States Army Command and General Staff College and completed the Defense Strategy Course.

In 1968, Padavan was appointed Deputy Commissioner of the New York City Department of Buildings, a position in which he remained until his election to the State Senate in 1972, in which he defeated incumbent senator Murray Schwartz. He was a member of the New York State Senate from 1973 to 2010.

Padavan died October 8, 2018, at New York–Presbyterian Hospital. He was 83.

== See also ==
- 2009 New York State Senate leadership crisis

New York State Senate
Preceded by John J. Santucci	Member of the New York State Senate from the 11th district 1973–2010	Succeeded by Tony Avella
