= Vickie Paladino =

American politician (born 1954)

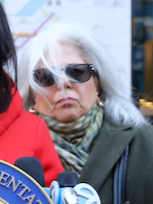
- Paladino in 2024

Member of the New York City Council from the 19th district
- Incumbent
- Assumed office January 1, 2022
- Preceded by: Paul Vallone

Minority Whip of the New York City Council
- In office February 7, 2025 – January 7, 2026
- Preceded by: Inna Vernikov
- Succeeded by: Inna Vernikov

Personal details
- Born: Vickie Albrizio; October 28, 1954 (age 72) New York, New York, U.S.
- Party: Republican
- Spouse: Thomas Paladino Sr.
- Children: 2
- Website: City Council website

Vickie Albrizio Paladino (Note: Albrizio is her maiden name, not her middle name. She has no publicized middle name. Paladino is her married name.) (née Albrizio; born October 28, 1954) is an American politician. Since 2021, Paladino has served as a member of the New York City Council from District 19 in northeast Queens. In 2025, Paladino was named minority whip of the City Council. A conservative Republican, Paladino is known for her social media posts.

== Political career ==
In 2017, Paladino gained media attention after she confronted then-New York City Mayor Bill de Blasio. Paladino, who was on her way home from a nail salon, stopped to shout at de Blasio for having traveled to Germany to attend a protest a day after a New York City police officer had been shot to death. Paladino told de Blasio, "I want to know why you let your police officers down and our country down by going to Germany and protesting against our country."

In 2018, Paladino ran for State Senate's District 11, but was defeated by Democrat John Liu 54% to 24%.

=== New York City Council ===
In 2021, Paladino ran as a Republican for City Council District 19 and narrowly defeated Democratic former State Senator Tony Avella to win election to the New York City Council, 47% to 45%. District 19 represents northeast Queens and includes College Point, Whitestone, Bayside, Douglaston, Little Neck, and parts of Flushing.

Paladino was blocked from entering the City Council Chamber in January 2022 because she declined to provide proof that she had been vaccinated against COVID-19. She told NY1, "I don't need to show you my papers... This is not Nazi Germany". Her statement was widely condemned as trivializing the Holocaust; she later apologized for it. Paladino participated in City Council proceedings online. She was eventually granted a religious exemption from the vaccine mandate and was allowed to enter the Council chamber.

In 2022, a video of Paladino went viral. The video depicts Paladino confronting a man she alleges lives in a "squatter house". She tells the man that his house is "a disgrace"; an exchange of profanities follows. Paladino then adds, "You got an eviction notice... you'd better make sure you get out because we won't have these goings-on in this neighborhood." Paladino then asks the man what is in his mouth; he responds, "Weed", and proceeds to blow marijuana smoke at her.

In 2023, Paladino won re-election, defeating Avella in a rematch, 60% to 39%. She was appointed minority whip of the New York City Council in early 2025, winning re-election later that year against Democrat Ben Chou, 57% to 43%.

In March 2026, the New York City Council’s Standards and Ethics Committee filed disciplinary charges against Paladino for multiple social media posts, including posts regarding Zohran Mamdani. Paladino filed suit against the City Council and various councilmembers, claiming First Amendment violations and selective enforcement based on disfavored speech. In May 2026, Paladino and the City Council settled the proceedings. Pursuant to the settlement, Paladino was required to delete three of her X posts, publicly apologize, and remove mention of her job as Councilmember from her X display name. The City Council agreed to withdraw the disciplinary proceedings against Paladino.

Paladino later called for mayor Mamdani to skip the 25th memorial for the September 11 attacks.

== Political positions ==
Paladino is a conservative Republican. Paladino is known for her controversial social media presence and her brash personality. She is a supporter of law enforcement, small businesses, and Donald Trump.

Paladino opposed the construction of a casino near Citi Field in Queens. Paladino supports a delay on NYC's reduction requirements for greenhouse gases. Paladino supports legislation to waive fees for gun permits.

=== Congestion pricing and transit ===
During her time on the New York City Council, Paladino has been a critic of bicyclists in New York City. She has called for bicyclists to carry liability insurance, register their bikes and carry license plates.

Paladino supports harsher penalties on drivers with fake temporary plates. In 2023, a car owned by Paladino's son Thomas Paladino Jr. was parked in her driveway with an allegedly fraudulent license plate.

In January 2025, Paladino – a "constant critic of congestion pricing" – posted an online "warning" that laser pointers could "permanently damage the cameras used to track drivers entering the new toll zone in Manhattan". In response to a report by a StreetsBlog NYC reporter on illegal parking on sidewalks by the New York City Police Department, Paladino posted on X that "You can just tell when a guy has never been punched in the face." A spokesperson for the New York City Council said "violent rhetoric is unacceptable" from councilmembers.

=== Immigration ===
In 2022, Paladino opposed the proposed use of the Hotel de Point as a migrant shelter. In 2023, she opposed the use of the former St. Agnes Parochial School as a migrant shelter and worked toward the shelter's closure.

==== Deportation of Muslims ====
On June 2, 2025, Paladino called for the deportation of New York State Assemblymember and then-candidate for New York City Mayor Zohran Mamdani. She made the comment via an X post, questioning his opinion of the United States and his political views. Mamdani, a United States citizen who was naturalized in 2018, immigrated to the United States from Uganda as a child.

Following the 2025 Bondi Beach shooting during the Hanukkah celebration, Paladino wrote an Islamophobic post calling for the "expulsion of Muslims from western nations." Paladino deleted the post following condemnations from her City Council colleagues and other politicians, including then-New York City Mayor-elect Mamdani. The progressive faction also called for Paladino to be reprimanded for her anti-Muslim posts on social media.

=== Israel–Palestine ===
Paladino supports Israel. In 2024, Paladino described American pro-Palestinian protesters as "the worst people our society has ever produced". In response to campus protests against the Gaza War, Paladino called students "monsters" who must be "slayed".

=== LGBTQ rights ===
In March 2023, Paladino was removed from the City Council's Mental Health Committee in response to her 2022 comments about Drag Queen Story Hour, a program in which drag performers read storybooks to children at schools and public libraries. Paladino had referred to the program as "cultural indoctrination" and "child grooming". Paladino received death threats following her 2022 remarks.

=== Social media presence ===
Paladino's son, Thomas Paladino Jr., has worked as her spokesperson and helps run her campaign social media. In 2018, Thomas posted racist and white supremacist content on far‑right platform Gab.

== Electoral history ==
=== 2025 ===
2025 New York City Council election, District 19
Party	Candidate	Votes	%
Republican	Vickie Paladino	22,417	51.7
Conservative	Vickie Paladino	2,453	5.7
Total	Vickie Paladino (incumbent)	24,870	57.3
Democratic	Benjamin Chou	18,496	42.6
Write-in		32	0.1
Total votes		43,398	100.0
Republican hold			

=== 2023 ===
2023 New York City Council election, District 19
Party	Candidate	Votes	%
Republican	Vickie Paladino	10,700	54.1
Conservative	Vickie Paladino (Note: Shared with "Common Sense" ballot line.)	1,161	5.9
Total	Vickie Paladino (incumbent)	11,861	59.9
Democratic	Tony Avella	7,646	38.6
Taxpayers Unite	Tony Avella	214	1.1
Total	Tony Avella	7,860	39.7
Write-in		70	0.4
Total votes		19,791	100.0
Republican hold			

=== 2021 ===
2021 New York City Council Republican primary, District 19
Party	Candidate	Votes	%
Republican	Vickie Paladino	1,765	51.6
Republican	John-Alexander M. Sakelos	1,608	47.0
Write-in		47	1.4
Total votes		3,420	100.0

2021 New York City Council election, District 19
Party	Candidate	Votes	%
Republican	Vickie Paladino	12,325	45.4
Independent	Vickie Paladino	465	1.7
Total	Vickie Paladino	12,790	47.2
Democratic	Tony Avella	12,400	45.7
Conservative	John-Alexander M. Sakelos	1,641	6.1
Save Our City	John-Alexander M. Sakelos	216	0.8
Total	John-Alexander M. Sakelos	1,857	6.8
Write-in		71	0.3
Total votes		27,118	100.0
Republican gain from Democratic			

=== 2018 ===
2018 New York State Senate Republican primary, District 11
Party	Candidate	Votes	%
Republican	Vickie Paladino	1,735	56.0
Republican	Simon H. Minching	1,323	42.7
Write-in		39	1.3
Total votes		3,097	100.0

2018 New York State Senate election, District 11
Party	Candidate	Votes	%
Democratic	John Liu	42,047	53.6
Republican	Vickie Paladino	19,062	24.3
Independence	Tony Avella	15,528	19.8
Women's Equality	Tony Avella	713	0.9
Total	Tony Avella (incumbent)	16,241	20.7
Conservative	Simon H. Minching	1,123	1.4
Write-in		41	0.1
Total votes		78,514	100.0
Democratic hold			

== Notes ==
Political offices
Preceded by Paul Vallone	Member of the New York City Council from the 19th district 2022–present	Incumbent
