= Senator Schwartz (disambiguation) =

Henry H. Schwartz (1869–1955) was a U.S. Senator from Wyoming from 1937 to 1943. Senator Schwartz may also refer to:

- A. R. Schwartz (1926–2018), Texas State Senate
- Allyson Schwartz (born 1948), Pennsylvania State Senate
- Gail Schwartz (1990s–2010s), Colorado State Senate
- Murray Schwartz (Queens politician) (1919–2001), New York State Senate

== See also ==
- Joe Schwarz (1937–2026), Michigan State Senate
