= Murray Schwartz =

Murray Schwartz may refer to:

- Murray Schwartz (Queens politician) (1919–2001), New York politician
- Murray Merle Schwartz (1931–2013), US federal judge from Delaware
