= Paul Vallone =

American politician (1967–2024)

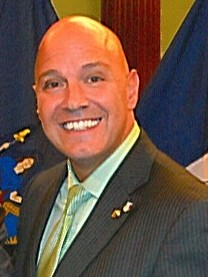

Deputy Commissioner of the New York City Department of Veterans' Services
- In office January 17, 2022 – January 28, 2024
- Commissioner: James Hendon
- Succeeded by: Glenda Villareal

Member of the New York City Council from the 19th district
- In office January 1, 2014 – December 31, 2021
- Preceded by: Dan Halloran
- Succeeded by: Vickie Paladino

Personal details
- Born: June 2, 1967 New York City, New York, U.S.
- Died: January 28, 2024 (aged 56) New York City, New York, U.S.
- Party: Democratic
- Spouse: Anna-Marie Vallone
- Children: 3
- Education: Fordham University (BA); St. John's University (JD)
- Website: Official website

Paul Angelo Vallone (June 2, 1967 – January 28, 2024) was an American politician and attorney from the state of New York. A Democrat, Vallone represented the 19th district on the New York City Council from 2014 to 2021; the district was located in northeast Queens. He later served as the Deputy Commissioner of External Affairs for the New York City Department of Veterans' Services.

== Early life, education, and legal career ==
Paul Vallone was the son of New York City Council Speaker Peter Vallone Sr.; the grandson of Judge Charles J. Vallone; and the brother of Peter Vallone Jr., a politician and judge. Paul Vallone attended high school at St. John's Preparatory School. He then graduated from Fordham University with a Bachelor of Arts and from St. John's University with a Juris Doctor.

Prior to entering politics, Vallone served as the managing partner for the law firm of Vallone & Vallone, LLP. The firm was founded by his grandfather, Charles J. Vallone, in 1932. Both Vallone's father and his brother served on the New York City Council before he did.

== Public service career ==
Vallone first ran for the New York City Council in 2009, but came in third in the Democratic primary for the 19th district. In the 2013 Democratic primary election for the same seat, Vallone defeated Austin Shafran. He defeated Republican Party nominee Dennis Saffran in the general election. Vallone was re-elected in 2017.

In 2021, Vallone ran for a municipal judgeship, but was defeated by Republican Joseph Kasper.

After his City Council tenure ended due to term limits, Vallone served as the Deputy Commissioner of External Affairs for the New York City Department of Veterans' Services.

=== Electoral results ===
Election history
Location	Year	Election	Results
NYC Council District 19	2009	Democratic Primary	√ Kevin D. Kim 30.74% Jerry M. Iannece 24.09% Paul Vallone 22.89% Steve Behar 9.82% Thomas E. Cooke 7.21% Debra Markell 5.25%
NYC Council District 19	2013	Democratic Primary	√ Paul Vallone 31.16% Austin I. Shafran 29.09% Paul Graziano 17.08% John F. Duane 12.41% Chrissy Voskerichian 10.27%
NYC Council District 19	2013	General	√ Paul Vallone (D) 56.78% Dennis Saffran (R) 42.99%
NYC Council District 19	2017	Democratic Primary	√ Paul Vallone 55.05% Paul Graziano 44.77%
NYC Council District 19	2017	General	√ Paul Vallone (D) 57.85% Konstantinos Poulidis (R) 24.50% Paul Graziano (Reform) 17.58%
NYC Civil Court Queens 3rd Municipal Court District	2021	General	√ Joseph Kasper (R) 51.04% Paul Vallone (D) 48.84%

== Personal life and death ==
Vallone and his wife, Anna-Marie, had three children. He had long-term sarcoidosis of the lungs and tested positive for COVID-19 in April 2020 during New York's first wave of the pandemic.

Vallone died of a heart attack on January 28, 2024, at the age of 56.

Political offices
Preceded by Daniel Halloran	Member of the New York City Council from the 19th district 2014–2021	Succeeded by Vickie Paladino
