= John Liu =

American politician (born 1967)

- 劉醇逸
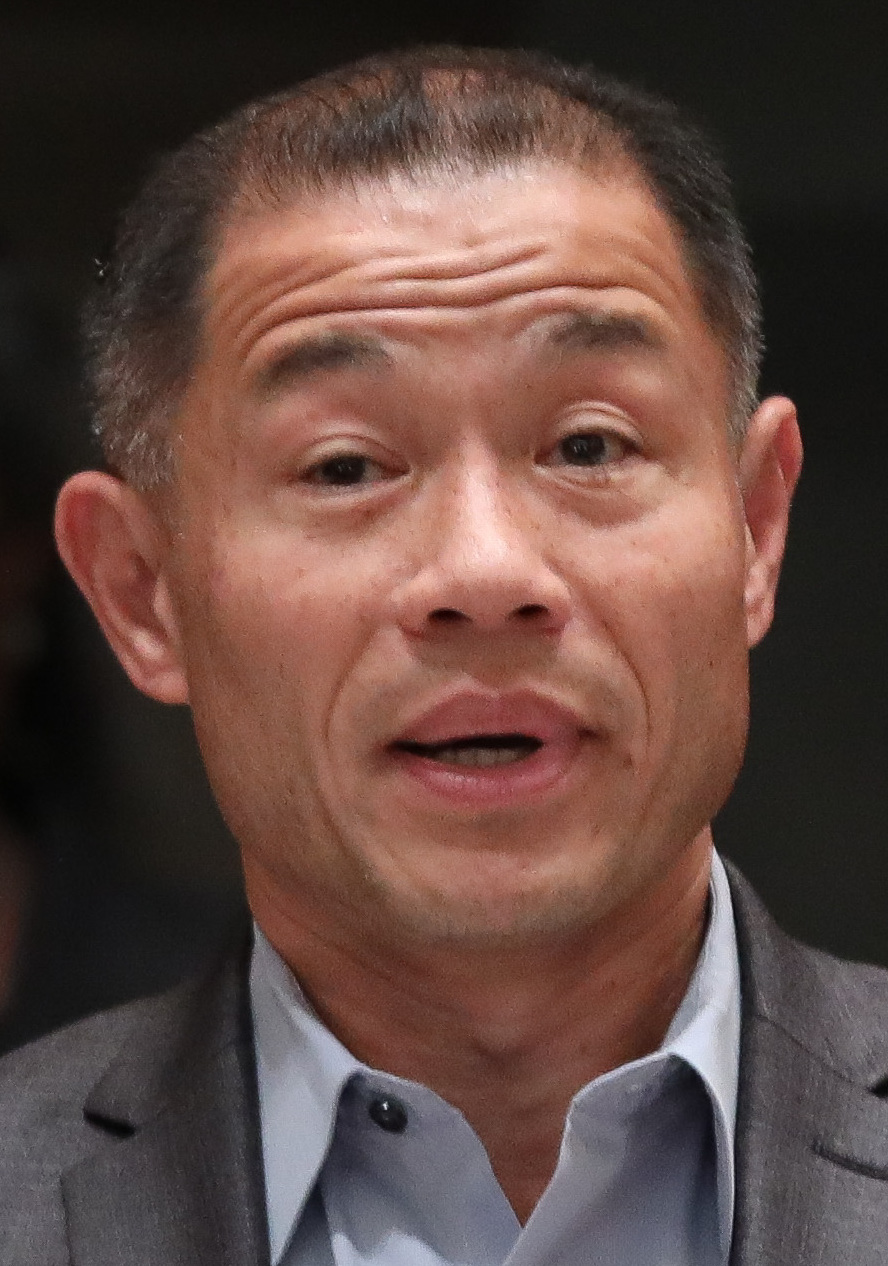
- Liu in 2019

Member of the New York State Senate from the 16th district
- Incumbent
- Assumed office January 1, 2019
- Preceded by: Tony Avella
- Constituency: 11th district (2019–2023); 16th district (2023–present)

43rd Comptroller of New York City
- In office January 1, 2010 – December 31, 2013
- Mayor: Michael Bloomberg
- Preceded by: Bill Thompson
- Succeeded by: Scott Stringer

Member of the New York City Council from the 20th district
- In office January 1, 2002 – December 31, 2009
- Preceded by: Julia Harrison
- Succeeded by: Peter Koo

Personal details
- Born: Chun Liu; January 8, 1967 (age 59) Taiwan
- Party: Democratic
- Spouse: Jenny Liu
- Children: 1
- Education: Binghamton University (BS)
- Website: State Senate website

John Chun Yah Liu (traditional Chinese: 劉醇逸; born January 8, 1967) is an American educator and politician in New York City. A member of the Democratic Party, he is a member of the New York State Senate for the 16th district in northeast Queens. He previously served as the 43rd New York City Comptroller from 2010 to 2013, and as a member of the New York City Council from 2002 to 2009, representing the 20th district in northeast Queens. He was the first Asian American New York City Council member and Comptroller, and one of the first two Asian American New York state senators, as well as the first elected to legislative or citywide office in New York. He was also a candidate in the 2013 New York City mayoral election.

Liu teaches municipal finance and policy at Baruch College, Queens College of the City University of New York, and at Columbia University.

== Early life and education ==
Chun Liu was born in Taiwan and moved to the United States at age five. His father, Chang Liu, was an MBA student and bank teller. In honor of John F. Kennedy and the Kennedy family, Liu's father changed his sons' names to John, Robert, and Edward, and his own name to Joseph.

Liu attended PS 203 in Queens, and Hunter College High School. He graduated from Bronx High School of Science in 1985, doing community organizing and volunteer work in his spare time.

During his years attending Binghamton University, he majored in mathematical physics and rose to executive vice president of the university's Student Association. He worked as a manager at PricewaterhouseCoopers and served as president of the North Flushing Civic Association before his election to the City Council.

== Career ==
=== New York City Council (2002–2009) ===
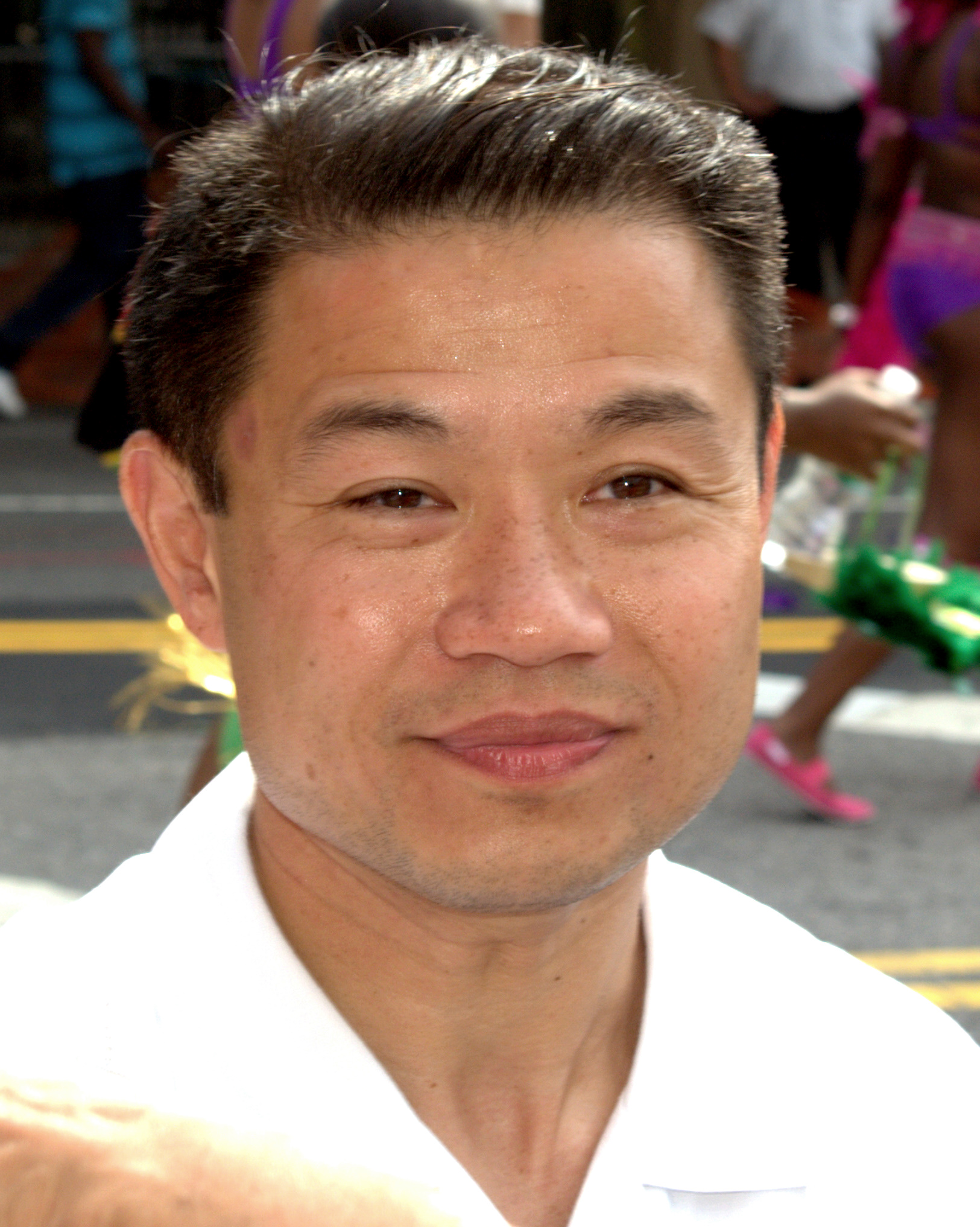
Liu in 2009

Liu was elected to the New York City Council in 2001, representing northeast Queens in the 20th district as its first Asian American member. He also served as the Chairperson of the New York City Council's Transportation Committee, and served on the committees on Education, Consumer Affairs, Health, Land Use, Contracts, Oversight & Investigations as well as Lower Manhattan Redevelopment. Liu was known for his outspoken and confrontational demeanor.

=== Comptroller (2010–2013) ===
In March 2009, Liu announced that he was running for the post of New York City Comptroller. Liu had raised $3 million for his political run.

In May, Liu picked up endorsements from several organizations: The Village Independent Democrats, The Queens County Democratic organization, the local Americans for Democratic Action chapter and the Working Families Party, 1199 SEIU union local and the Uniformed Firefighters Association.

Later, in September 2009, the United Federation of Teachers (UFT) began endorsing Liu. In the September 15 Democratic primary, Liu was the front-runner, ending up with 133,986 votes (38% of the vote), but because he did not manage to reach 40% of the vote, a run-off election was required between Liu and David Yassky, who received 30 percent of the vote in the primary.Liu won the run-off with 55.6% of the vote.

In the general election on November 3, Liu won with a total of 696,330 votes (76% of votes). Republican candidate Joseph Mendola came in second with 19.3% of the vote.

During his tenure as New York comptroller, Liu claimed to have saved New York City more than $3 billion by cracking down on wasteful expenditures and cutting inefficiencies. He spearheaded Checkbook 2.0, an initiative to upgrade the city's online transparency system.

Liu is a leader of the Asian Political Leadership Fund, a federally designated 527 fund whose purpose is to promote political leadership from within the Asian American community.

=== Mayoral run (2013) ===
Liu ran as a candidate for Mayor of New York City in the 2013 election, losing in fourth place in the Democratic Party's primary election.

==== Political positions ====
His platform in the primary included:

1. Improving air quality and clean water by improving the city's transit system, pressuring the MTA to modernize their transit systems in order to reduce greenhouse gas emission and improve energy efficiency.
2. Greatly improve energy efficiency by supporting large-scale energy alternatives such as solar and wind energy as opposed to the usage of fossil fuels which would quickly deplete the Earth's natural resources as well as release about 10 billion tonnes of greenhouse gases every year.
3. Create opportunities to source food locally, which would improve New York's economy and further distribute capital throughout the City in an environmentally sound way.
4. Expanding safe streets for Senior Citizens by creating shorter crosswalks, implementing more countdown timers, and creating larger signs to reduce the risk of injury from careless drivers, inattentiveness, etc.
5. Support revitalizing brownfields, abandoned areas which were previously used as industrial centers for factories and mass production.
6. Advocating to increase minimum wage from $7.25/hour to $11.50/hour to increase the standard of living in New York City.
7. Legalizing, regulating and taxing the production and sale of recreational and medicinal marijuana to adults of age 21 and older, and directing the tax revenues and savings to university education.

==== Denial of matching funds ====
Investigations into Liu's election fundraising revealed that two of his former associates used straw donors to contribute to his Comptroller campaign, a discovery that rattled his 2013 campaign. On August 5, 2013, the Campaign Finance Board denied Liu matching funds worth $3.53 million for his campaign. His supporters disagreed with the decision, saying they had legitimately donated funds to Liu's campaign and were being denied their rights.

==== Investigations into fundraising associates and trial (2011–2013) ====
On November 17, 2011, Oliver Pan was arrested on charges of wire fraud from illegal donations. Pan was approached by an undercover FBI agent posing as someone who wanted to donate $16,000 to Liu, well over the city donation limit of $4,950 for individual contributions, and agreed to arranged for 20 fictitious donors.

In February 2012, campaign treasurer Jia "Jenny" Hou was arrested for using straw donors to circumvent campaign finance laws and gain more matching funds from taxpayers. In October 2013, she was sentenced to ten months in prison after her conviction for attempted wire fraud, obstruction of justice and making false statements. Pan's sentence was later reduced to four months in jail.

Liu was never accused of any wrongdoing in connection with his staffers. On the eve of their 2013 trial, he expressed frustration with the U.S. Attorney Preet Bharara's office for what observers have described as an "extraordinarily intrusive and exhaustive investigation," and was critical of the lengthy three-year long process and the interrogation of thousands of his supporters.

=== State Senate ===
==== 2014 State Senate bid ====
In September 2014, Liu ran in the Democratic primary race for New York State Senate District 11 (which includes some of the same neighborhoods as City Council District 20), losing to incumbent Tony Avella 47-52%. Liu and Avella had previously served together in the City Council, representing neighboring districts, and the two had a strained relationship.

Liu criticized Avella for joining the Independent Democratic Conference (IDC), a group of senate Democrats that allied themselves with the Senate Republican Conference, creating a coalition that controlled the Senate. At the time, Democrats held a numerical majority in the Senate, but the IDC-Republican coalition prevented Democrats from holding power, while allowing Avella and other IDC members to gain committee chairpersonships. Avella criticized Liu over the latter's campaign finance scandal, his failure to pay fines from his earlier campaign for Comptroller, and his record as Comptroller.

Liu was initially supported by the Working Families Party, by the Queens County Democratic Party and by several unions, but these organizations largely dropped their support of Liu when Jeff Klein, leader of the IDC, Tony Avella, and the other members of the IDC announced that they would rejoin the mainline Democratic Conference after the 2014 elections. However, after Republicans gained an outright majority in the State Senate in the 2014 elections, the IDC continued to caucus with the Republicans.

In 2014, Liu rejoined Columbia University's School of International and Public Affairs, where he has taught public finance. He also began a teaching position at Baruch College.

==== 2018 State Senate bid ====
Liu initially stated he had no plans to run for office after his 2014 loss to Avella and declined offers to do so, but was inspired after Alexandria Ocasio-Cortez's upset victory over incumbent Congressman Joe Crowley in the June 2018 Congressional primary elections. He was then convinced to run for state senate by activists looking to defeat former IDC members. Liu was initially doubtful that the grassroots campaigners that approached him could gather enough signatures to place him on the ballot so close to the July filing deadline, but he received more than three times the number of signatures needed. New York's 14th congressional district, which Crowley represented, partially overlaps with State Senate District 11.

Unlike in 2014, the Queens County Democratic Party, which Crowley chaired at the time, endorsed Avella instead of Liu. In the September 2018 Democratic primary, Liu once again challenged Avella. In a reversal of their 2014 race, Liu defeated Avella 53-47%, attributed to backlash against the former members of the Independent Democratic Conference, which had dissolved earlier in 2018.

In the November 2018 general election, Liu won a four-way race with 54% of the vote, defeating Republican Vickie Paladino with 24% of the vote, Avella, running on two third-party lines with 21% of the vote, and third-party candidate Simon Minching with 1% of the vote, becoming one of the two first Asian Americans in the New York Senate.

==== 2022 election ====
Liu won reelection in 2022. In 2023, Liu's Senate district changed from the 11th to the 16th.

== See also ==
- Taiwanese Americans in New York City
- Chinese Americans in New York City
- Government of New York City

Political offices
Preceded by Bill Thompson	Comptroller of New York City; 2010–2013	Succeeded by Scott Stringer
