= Toby Ann Stavisky =

American politician (born 1939)

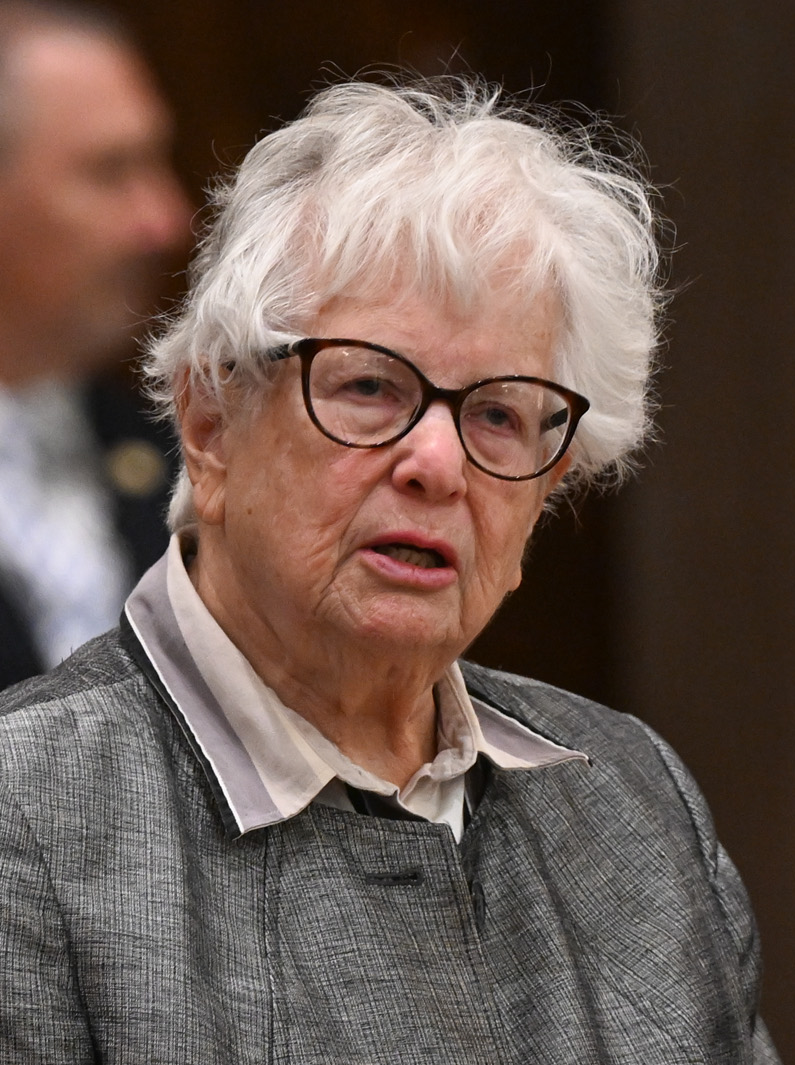
- Stavisky in 2025

Member of the New York Senate from the 11th district
- Incumbent
- Assumed office November 3, 1999
- Preceded by: Leonard P. Stavisky
- Constituency: 16th district (1999-2022); 11th district (2023-present)

Personal details
- Born: Toby Ann Goldhaar; June 26, 1939 (age 87) New York City, New York, U.S.
- Party: Democratic
- Spouse: Leonard P. Stavisky (m. 1964; died 1999)
- Education: Syracuse University (BA); Hunter College (MA); Queens College (MA)
- Website: State Senate website

Toby Ann Stavisky (née Goldhaar, born June 26, 1939) is an American politician serving as a member of the New York State Senate, having held a seat since 1999. She represents the 11th district, which comprises parts of Queens.

== Life and career ==
Stavisky was born and raised on the Upper West Side of Manhattan. She attended New York City public schools before graduating from Bronx High School of Science. She attended the Maxwell School of Citizenship and Public Affairs at Syracuse University on an academic scholarship, graduating in 1960. Stavisky completed graduate courses at Hunter College and Queens College.

After working in the actuarial department of a major insurance company, Stavisky taught Social Studies in the New York City high schools. She served as District Manager in Northeast Queens for the Census, where she directed more than 1,000 field and office staff.

Stavisky was married to Dr. Leonard P. Stavisky, a member of the New York State Assembly from 1966 to 1983, and of the New York State Senate from 1983 until his death in 1999. Her son, Evan M. Stavisky, is a political consultant as well as a local district leader. She is Jewish.

== New York Senate ==
Upon the death of her husband in 1999, Stavisky ran and easily won the special election to succeed him. She is the first woman from Queens County elected to the State Senate. When she first won election, the district was predominantly Jewish, but has shifted drastically over the past two decades to become majority Asian American. Stavisky faced primary challenges from Asian-American candidates.

From 2003 to 2008, Stavisky served as Assistant Minority Whip and Ranking Minority Member of the Committee on Higher Education. She currently serves as the Chairwoman of the Committee on Higher Education. In 2013, Stavisky was appointed to the subcommittee on New York City Education.

In July 2023, Governor Kathy Hochul signed legislation sponsored by Stavisky and Assemblymember Daniel Rosenthal requiring New York colleges to post campus crime statistics on their websites, implement plans for investigating hate crimes on campus, and inform new students about prevention measures.

In December 2024, Hochul signed a bill sponsored by Stavisky and Assemblymember Linda Rosenthal requiring large-group private health insurance plans in New York to cover scalp cooling systems, which reduce hair loss during chemotherapy, making New York the first state to mandate such coverage.

In August 2025, Hochul signed a bill sponsored by Stavisky and Assemblymember Nily Rozic requiring every New York college and university to designate a Title VI coordinator to receive and investigate discrimination complaints under Title VI of the Civil Rights Act of 1964.

Stavisky has claimed that New York's bail reform laws have had no clear impact on the increase in crime.

In 2023, Stavisky's Senate district changed from the 16th to the 11th.

Electoral History
Year	Senator	Votes	%	Opponent	Votes	%	Opponent	Votes	%
1999	Toby Stavisky	7,688	92%	Richard Jannaccio	639	8%			
2000	Toby Stavisky	36,913	98%	Josephine Jones	783	2%			
2002 (primary)	Toby Stavisky	7,559	60%	Julia Harrison	4,938	40%			
2002	Toby Stavisky	28,836	83%	Julia Harrison	4,008	12%	Mark Ralin	1,545	4.5%
2004	Toby Stavisky	54,419	100%	unopposed					
2006	Toby Stavisky	36,134	100%	unopposed					
2008 (primary)	Toby Stavisky	5,459	67%	Robert Schwartz	2,687	33%			
2008	Toby Stavisky	51,076	69.5%	Peter Koo	22,482	30.5%			
2010 (primary)	Toby Stavisky	7,480	47.5%	Isaac Sasson	5,287	33.5%	John Messer	2,997	19%
2010	Toby Stavisky	34,471	87%	Robert Schwartz	5,171	13%			
2012 (primary)	Toby Stavisky	5,337	58%	John Messer	3,879	42%			
2012	Toby Stavisky	43,978	76.5%	JD Kim	13,507	23.5%			
2014 (primary)	Toby Stavisky	5,417	60%	SJ Jung	3,880	40%			
2014	Toby Stavisky	21,166	100%	unopposed					
2016 (primary)	Toby Stavisky	5,690	59%	SJ Jung	3,966	41%			
2016	Toby Stavisky	52,495	78%	Carlos Giron	14,856	22%			
2018	Toby Stavisky	42,816	95.5%	Vincent Pazienza	2,053	4.5%			
2020	Toby Stavisky	65,240	100%	unopposed					
2022 (11 SD)	Toby Stavisky	38,524	57%	Stefano Forte	29,378	43%			
