= New York's 16th State Senate district =

American legislative district

Senator
John C. Liu; D–Queens
- Registration: 58.9% Democratic; 11.2% Republican; 26.8% No party preference
- Demographics: 21% White; 3% Black; 18% Hispanic; 55% Asian
- Population (2017): 325,941
- Registered voters: 158,669

New York's 16th State Senate district is one of 63 districts in the New York State Senate. It has been represented by Democrat John C. Liu since 2023.

== Geography ==
District 16 covers part of central Queens, including parts of the neighborhoods of Flushing, Fresh Meadows, and Bayside.

The district overlaps with New York's 6th and 14th congressional districts, and with the 24th, 25th, 26th, 27th, 28th, 30th, 34th, 35th, 39th, and 40th districts of the New York State Assembly.

== Recent election results ==
=== 2026 ===
2026 New York State Senate election, District 16
Party	Candidate	Votes	%
Democratic	John Liu		
Working Families	John Liu		
Total	John Liu (incumbent)		
Write-in			
Total votes			100.0

=== 2024 ===
2024 New York State Senate election, District 16
Party	Candidate	Votes	%
Democratic	John Liu	43,841	
Working Families	John Liu	4,629	
Total	John Liu (incumbent)	48,470	79.4
Conservative	Juan Pagan	12,299	20.1
Write-in		286	0.5
Total votes		61,055	100.0
Democratic hold			

=== 2022 ===
2022 New York State Senate election, District 16
Party	Candidate	Votes	%
Democratic	John Liu	26,601	
Working Families	John Liu	2,114	
Total	John Liu	28,715	57.7
Republican	Ruben Cruz II	19,326	
Conservative	Ruben Cruz II	1,422	
Independence	Ruben Cruz II	285	
Total	Ruben Cruz II	21,033	42.2
Write-in		48	0.1
Total votes		49,796	100.0
Democratic win (new boundaries)			

=== 2020 ===
2020 New York State Senate election, District 16
Party	Candidate	Votes	%
Democratic	Toby Ann Stavisky (incumbent)	65,240	98.9
Write-in		716	1.1
Total votes		65,956	100.0
Democratic hold			

=== 2018 ===
2018 New York State Senate election, District 16
Party	Candidate	Votes	%
Democratic	Toby Ann Stavisky	39,951	
Working Families	Toby Ann Stavisky	2,201	
Women's Equality	Toby Ann Stavisky	664	
Total	Toby Ann Stavisky (incumbent)	42,816	95.0
Reform	Vincent Pazienza	2,053	4.5
Write-in		211	0.5
Total votes		45,080	100.0
Democratic hold			

=== 2016 ===
2016 New York State Senate election, District 16
Primary election
Party	Candidate	Votes	%
Democratic	Toby Ann Stavisky (incumbent)	5,690	58.8
Democratic	S.J. Jung	3,966	41.0
Write-in		21	0.2
Total votes		9,677	100.0
General election
Democratic	Toby Ann Stavisky	49,431	
Working Families	Toby Ann Stavisky	2,013	
Women's Equality	Toby Ann Stavisky	1,051	
Total	Toby Ann Stavisky (incumbent)	52,495	77.9
Republican	Carlos Giron	13,092	
Conservative	Carlos Giron	1,311	
Reform	Carlos Giron	453	
Total	Carlos Giron	14,856	22.0
Write-in		79	0.1
Total votes		67,430	100.0
Democratic hold			

=== 2014 ===
2014 New York State Senate election, District 16
Primary election
Party	Candidate	Votes	%
Democratic	Toby Ann Stavisky (incumbent)	5,417	57.9
Democratic	S.J. Jung	3,880	41.5
Write-in		54	0.6
Total votes		9,351	100.0
General election
Democratic	Toby Ann Stavisky	18,784	
Working Families	Toby Ann Stavisky	1,648	
Independence	Toby Ann Stavisky	734	
Total	Toby Ann Stavisky (incumbent)	21,166	98.8
Write-in		261	1.2
Total votes		21,427	100.0
Democratic hold			

=== 2012 ===
2012 New York State Senate election, District 16
Primary election
Party	Candidate	Votes	%
Democratic	Toby Ann Stavisky (incumbent)	5,377	57.9
Democratic	John Messer	3,879	41.8
Write-in		23	0.3
Total votes		9,279	100.0
General election
Democratic	Toby Ann Stavisky	41,920	
Working Families	Toby Ann Stavisky	1,338	
Independence	Toby Ann Stavisky	722	
Total	Toby Ann Stavisky (incumbent)	43,980	76.4
Republican	J.D. Kim	12,424	
Conservative	J.D. Kim	1,083	
Total	J.D. Kim	13,507	23.5
Write-in		48	0.1
Total votes		57,535	100.0
Democratic hold			

=== Federal results in District 16 ===
Year	Office	Results
2020	President	Biden 66.0 – 32.8%
2016	President	Clinton 71.3 – 26.1%
2012	President	Obama 74.1 – 24.9%
2012	Senate	Gillibrand 80.2 – 18.5%
