= New York's 11th State Senate district =

American legislative district

Senator
| Toby Ann Stavisky; D–Queens |
- Registration: 55.0% Democratic; 17.2% Republican; 23.9% No party preference
- Demographics: 38% White; 3% Black; 16% Hispanic; 39% Asian
- Population (2017): 334,979
- Registered voters: 192,747

New York's 11th State Senate district is one of 63 districts in the New York State Senate. It has been represented by Democrat Toby Ann Stavisky since 2023.

== Geography ==
District 11 is located in Northeast Queens, including a large swath of predominantly Asian Flushing, as well as College Point, Whitestone, Bayside, Douglaston-Little Neck, and parts of Hollis and Bellerose.

The district overlaps with New York's 3rd, 5th, 6th, and 14th congressional districts, and with the 24th, 25th, 26th, 27th, 29th, 32nd, 33rd, and 40th districts of the New York State Assembly .

== Recent election results ==
=== 2026 ===
2026 New York State Senate election, District 11
| Party | Candidate | Votes | % |
|---|---|---|---|
| Democratic | Toby Ann Stavisky (incumbent) | | |
| Republican | Pamela Michos | | |
| Conservative | Pamela Michos | | |
| Total | Pamela Michos | | |
| Write-in | | | |
| Total votes | | | 100.0 |

=== 2024 ===
2024 New York State Senate election, District 11
| Party | Candidate | Votes | % |
|---|---|---|---|
| Democratic | Toby Ann Stavisky | 52,998 | |
| Working Families | Toby Ann Stavisky | 3,265 | |
| Total | Toby Ann Stavisky (incumbent) | 56,263 | 54.2 |
| Republican | Yiatin Chu | 43,524 | |
| Conservative | Yiatin Chu | 3,683 | |
| Total | Yiatin Chu | 47,207 | 45.4 |
| Write-in | | 439 | 0.4 |
| Total votes | | 103,909 | 100.0 |
| Democratic hold | | | |

=== 2022 ===
2022 New York State Senate election, District 11
| Party | Candidate | Votes | % |
|---|---|---|---|
| Democratic | Toby Ann Stavisky | 36,014 | |
| Working Families | Toby Ann Stavisky | 2,510 | |
| Total | Toby Ann Stavisky | 38,524 | 56.7 |
| Republican | Stefano Forte | 27,142 | |
| Conservative | Stefano Forte | 2,236 | |
| Total | Stefano Forte | 29,378 | 43.2 |
| Write-in | | 38 | 0.1 |
| Total votes | | 67,940 | 100.0 |
| Democratic win (new boundaries) | | | |

=== 2020 ===
2020 New York State Senate election, District 11
| Party | Candidate | Votes | % |
|---|---|---|---|
| Democratic | John Liu | 72,673 | |
| Working Families | John Liu | 6,145 | |
| Total | John Liu (incumbent) | 78,818 | 63.4 |
| Republican | Elisa Nahoum | 40,859 | |
| Conservative | Elisa Nahoum | 3,601 | |
| Save Our City | Elisa Nahoum | 940 | |
| Total | Elisa Nahoum | 45,400 | 36.5 |
| Write-in | | 97 | 0.1 |
| Total votes | | 124,315 | 100.0 |
| Democratic hold | | | |

=== 2018 ===
2018 New York State Senate election, District 11
Primary election
| Party | Candidate | Votes | % |
|---|---|---|---|
| Democratic | John Liu | 12,578 | 52.1 |
| Democratic | Tony Avella (incumbent) | 11,489 | 47.6 |
| Write-in | | 97 | 0.4 |
| Total votes | | 24,127 | 100.0 |
| Republican | Vickie Paladino | 1,735 | 56.0 |
| Republican | Simon Minching | 1,323 | 42.7 |
| Write-in | | 39 | 1.3 |
| Total votes | | 3,097 | 100.0 |
General election
| Democratic | John Liu | 42,047 | 53.5 |
| Republican | Vickie Paladino | 19,062 | 24.3 |
| Independence | Tony Avella | 15,528 | |
| Women's Equality | Tony Avella | 713 | |
| Total | Tony Avella (incumbent) | 16,241 | 20.7 |
| Conservative | Simon Minching | 1,123 | 1.4 |
| Write-in | | 40 | 0.1 |
| Total votes | | 78,513 | 100.0 |
| Democratic hold | | | |

=== 2016 ===
2016 New York State Senate election, District 11
| Party | Candidate | Votes | % |
|---|---|---|---|
| Democratic | Tony Avella (incumbent) | 72,520 | 69.4 |
| Republican | Mark Cipolla | 27,575 | |
| Conservative | Mark Cipolla | 3,206 | |
| Reform | Mark Cipolla | 1,016 | |
| Total | Mark Cipolla | 31,797 | 30.5 |
| Write-in | | 81 | 0.1 |
| Total votes | | 104,398 | 100.0 |
| Democratic hold | | | |

=== 2014 ===
2014 New York State Senate election, District 11
| Party | Candidate | Votes | % |
|---|---|---|---|
| Democratic | Tony Avella (incumbent) | 7,896 | 52.8 |
| Democratic | John Liu | 7,002 | 46.8 |
| Write-in | | 62 | 0.4 |
| Total votes | | 14,960 | 100.0 |
General election
| Democratic | Tony Avella | 29,359 | |
| Independence | Tony Avella | 3,591 | |
| Total | Tony Avella (incumbent) | 32,950 | 91.7 |
| Green | Paul Gilman | 2,813 | 7.8 |
| Write-in | | 164 | 0.5 |
| Total votes | | 35,927 | 100.0 |
| Democratic hold | | | |

=== 2012 ===
2012 New York State Senate election, District 11
| Party | Candidate | Votes | % |
|---|---|---|---|
| Democratic | Tony Avella | 61,007 | |
| Working Families | Tony Avella | 2,298 | |
| Independence | Tony Avella | 1,471 | |
| Total | Tony Avella (incumbent) | 64,776 | 73.3 |
| Republican | Joseph Concannon | 21,227 | |
| Conservative | Joseph Concannon | 2,323 | |
| Total | Joseph Concannon | 23,550 | 26.6 |
| Write-in | | 46 | 0.1 |
| Total votes | | 88,372 | 100.0 |
| Democratic hold | | | |

=== Federal results in District 11 ===
| Year | Office | Results |
|---|---|---|
| 2020 | President | Biden 59.6 – 39.1% |
| 2016 | President | Clinton 61.5 – 35.9% |
| 2012 | President | Obama 64.4 – 34.5% |
| 2012 | Senate | Gillibrand 71.4 – 24.5% |
