= Environmental planning =

Considering environment in developing land

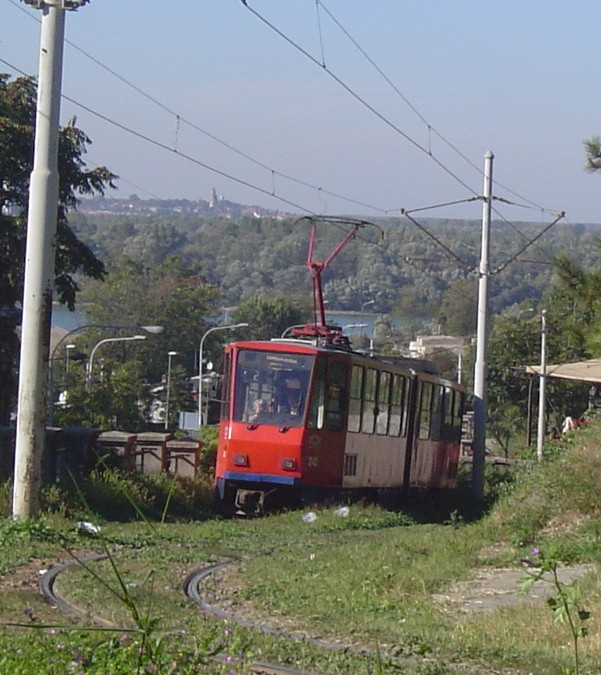
Grassed tram track in Belgrade, Serbia

Environmental planning is the process of facilitating decision making to carry out land development with the consideration given to the natural environment, social, political, economic and governance factors and provides a holistic framework to achieve sustainable outcomes. A major goal of environmental planning is to create sustainable communities, which aim to conserve and protect undeveloped land.

== Elements ==
Environmental planning concerns itself with the decision making processes where they are required for managing relationships that exist within and between natural systems and human systems. Environmental planning endeavors to manage these processes in an effective, orderly, transparent and equitable manner for the benefit of all constituents within such systems for the present and for the future. Present day environmental planning practices are the result of continuous refinement and expansion of the scope of such decision making processes.

Some of the main elements of present-day environmental planning are:

- Social and economic development
- Urban development
- Regional development
- Natural resource management and integrated land use
- Infrastructure systems
- Governance frameworks

The environmental planning assessments encompass areas such as land use, socio-economics, transportation, economic and housing characteristics, air pollution, noise pollution, the wetlands, habitat of the endangered species, flood zones susceptibility, coastal zones erosion, and visual studies among others, and is referred to as an Integrated environmental planning assessment. It is the ability to analyze environmental issues that will facilitate critical decision making.

Many environmental planning actions currently revolve around the reduction of emissions and material reuse, not adaptations in order to lessen future climate change impacts. This is most frequently seen as a result of the difficulty of predicting the long term effects of climate change. Climate action is very complex in nature and the timeline of emissions mitigation is unpredictable. However, as an alternative to avoiding adaptation, several cities in the US have taken an "anticipatory governance" approach. This method intends to explore the uncertainty surrounding the impacts of climate change specific to their communities in order to include adaptation in their environmental planning.

== Environmental justice ==
Environmental justice is the equitable inclusion and treatment of all human beings in all aspects of environmental planning, as well as in the enforcement of environmental legislation. It is increasingly recognized as a key part of environmental planning. Environmental justice issues are usually fought within communities to establish environmentally-friendly and accessible neighborhoods and living conditions, and to improve the local ecology. The Environmental Protection Agency has declared it essential that residents should play an active role in the reshaping of their neighborhoods.

Many levels of government and international organizations agree on the need for equitable and sustainable housing and transportation, as core characteristics of environmental justice; these are considered today a part of the battle against the climate crisis. Environmental activists act as watchdogs on government support for the battles of underrepresented communities against environmental hazards that threaten their health or way of life.

=== United States ===
In the United States of America, there have been numerous examples of the state provisioning of environmental justice in multiple communities. Listed are some of such projects:

- The Phillips community in Minneapolis, Minnesota: The Phillips community began a campaign against the city of Minneapolis to halt the construction of a garbage transfer station in their neighborhood. The city was ordered for the demolition of twenty-eight homes for the site, amassing ten acres of land; this project was soon stopped by the aforementioned Phillips neighborhood. The people of Phillips established an organization known as the "Green Institute" afterwards in order to repurpose this vacant ten-acre lot. The Green Institute partnered with the city of Minneapolis to create sustainable business enterprises to ultimately bolster the job market while improving Minneapolis' environment by reducing waste and promoting clean energy techniques. With funding from the city government of Minneapolis, the Green Institute has established city-wide projects such as the "ReUse Center" and the "DeConstruction" service. The ReUse Center's services provide systems to repurpose scavenged construction materials so that building waste is reduced; the DeConstruction service assists those who want to collect discarded construction materials from demolition or building sites to reclaim. With these services, it is estimated that up to 75 percent of unused structures can be repurposed and then sold for new uses. This idea for the Green Institute, first drummed up by the citizens of the Phillips community, was quickly incorporated as a government-funded project that advocates for environmental justice.

== North America ==
=== Canada ===
In Canada, "Planners safeguard the health and well-being of urban and rural communities, by addressing the use of land, resources, facilities and services with consideration to physical, economic, and social efficiency" as stated on the Canadian Institute of Planners official website.

=== United States ===
Local municipals around the US are implementing Climate Action Plans (CAPs) as urban areas grow. However, the level of detail is variable; some act more as motivational goals while others are a concrete plan for implementation. In the United States, for any project, environmental planners deal with a full range of environmental regulations from federal to state and city levels, administered federally by the Environmental Protection Agency. A rigorous environmental process has to be undertaken to examine the impacts and possible mitigation of any construction project was Depending on the scale and impact of the project, an extensive environmental review is known as an Environmental Impact Statement (EIS), and the less extensive version is Environmental Assessment (EA).

Procedures follow guidelines from National Environmental Policy Act (NEPA), State Environmental Quality Review Act (SEQRA) and/or City Environmental Quality Review (CEQR), and other related federal or state agencies published regulations. Eccleston has developed a set of tools and techniques for solving NEPA and environmental planning problems. A study found that the best may to minimize information asymmetry and goal incongruence between organizations working to implement environmental policy is to focus on principal-agent dynamics thus avoiding conflict and allowing for progress in addressing environmental issues.

The Association of Environmental Professionals (AEP) is a non-profit organization of interdisciplinary professionals including environmental science, resource management, environmental planning and other professions contributing to this field. AEP is the first organization of its kind in the US, and its influence and model have spawned numerous other regional organizations throughout the United States. Its mission is to improve the technical skills of members, and the organization is dedicated to "the enhancement, maintenance and protection of the natural and human environment". From inception in the mid-1970s the organization has been closely linked with the maintenance of the California Environmental Quality Act (CEQA), due to California being one of the first states to adopt a comprehensive legal framework to govern the environmental review of public policy and project review.

Leadership in Energy and Environmental Design (LEED) in the major qualification system for green building. It is a certification system created by the U.S. Green Building Council (USGBC) and is used worldwide. The program includes certifications for new types of buildings as well as existing building that are candidates for modification. The multi-tiered point system enables building to be certified beyond local, state and federal standards. LEED standards play an important role in quantifying a building's environmental impact, encouraging sustainable environmental practices, and acting as a hybrid between "material objects and human practices."

== Asia ==
=== Philippines ===
In the Philippines, Republic Act 10587 governs the practice of Environmental Planning. The law defines environmental planning as "a multi-disciplinary art and science of analyzing, specifying, clarifying, harmonizing, managing, and regulating the use and development of land and water resources in relation to their environs, for the development of sustainable communities and ecosystems." It is sometimes referred to as urban and regional planning, city planning, town and country planning, or human settlements planning.

An Environmental Planner is a person who is registered and licensed to practice environmental planning in the Philippines. To be a licensed environmental planner, an individual must hold a valid Certificate of Registration issued by the Professional Regulation Commission (PRC). To obtain these credentials, candidates must pass the Environmental Planning Board Exam.

Currently, there is a proposal to require a Bachelor of Science in Environmental Planning as a requisite for becoming a licensed environmental planner, with the change expected to take effect within five years. As of this writing, the curriculum for the BS Environmental Planning program is under review by the Commission on Higher Education (CHED).

The Philippine Institute of Environmental Planners (PIEP) is the only accredited professional organization for environmental planners in the Philippines. PIEP serves as the official body for advancing the profession and ensuring environmental planners adhere to high professional standards.

== Australia ==
Planning in Australia has shifted from a focus on amenity and resource use to a more integrated approach. Australia incorporated environmental considerations in land-use planning following the 1972 United Nations Conference on the Human Environment. This alignment with global trends reflected a shift towards integrated development planning that considers environmental impacts.

=== New South Wales ===
In NSW the first attempt to incorporate environmental assessment and protection into planning law began in 1974 with the appointment of a Planning and Environment Commission to overhaul the existing predominately urban land-use system. After various delays the Environmental Planning and Assessment Act 1979 (EP&A Act) came into force on 1 September 1980. The EP&A Act establishes a framework for assessing the environmental and community impacts of development proposals. It requires varying levels of assessment based on significance, and considers input from regulatory bodies and the public. The Act has been updated to give the government more influence in approvals, while also incorporating environmental protection measures.

=== Victoria ===
The Environment Effects Act 1978 was the first environmental planning control in Victoria, and it assessed the environmental impact of significant developments via an Environmental Effects Statement (EES). However the obligation for presenting an EES remained somewhat unclear and is ultimately at the discretion of the Minister for Planning. The Planning and Environment Act 1987 created a statewide nested planning process, Victoria Planning Provisions (VPP) which has within the statewide objectives:

"the protection of natural and man-made resources and the maintenance of ecological processes and genetic diversity" (PaE Act 1987, s4(1))

To achieve these ends, the VPP includes several overarching policy frameworks, including the identification of important environmental values and assets, such as 'protection of catchments, waterways and groundwater', 'coastal areas' and 'Conservation of native flora and fauna'. Below this level, local planning schemes identify land-uses through Zone designation, and also identify land affected by other criteria, called 'overlays'. Overlays include environmental parameters such as 'Environmental Significance', 'Vegetation Protection', 'Erosion Management' and 'Wildfire Management', but also social issues like 'Neighbourhood Character'. Below this again are various regulations on particular issues, such as details pertaining to regulation of areas of Native Vegetation DSE Victoria.

Reform has occurred to the Victorian framework in recent years aimed at improving land use and transport outcomes including consideration of environmental impacts. The Transport Integration Act identifies key planning agencies as interface bodies required to have regard to a vision for the transport system and objectives and decision making principles if decisions are likely to have a significant impact on Victoria's transport system. In addition, the Major Transport Projects Facilitation Act 2009 establishes a scheme to improve the approval and delivery of major rail, road and ports projects.

=== South Australia ===
Planning in South Australia is coordinated within the Development Act 1993. Under this law most urban and land-use planning is assessed against local plans of allowed development. The Minister must declare a proposed development either 'Major Development' or a 'Major Project' for it to be subjected to greater depth of environmental assessment and public consultation, via an independent Development Assessment Commission of experts. Complex proposals will generally require an indepth EIS. Planning SA.

=== Queensland ===
The Integrated Planning Act 1997 vested most planning control with local government, but required 'significant projects' to be assessed by a State Coordinator General and usually required an environmental impact statement (EIS).

This has been replaced by the Sustainable Planning Act 2009, which came into force 18 December 2009. This law aims to 'improve sustainable environmental outcomes through streamlined processes', and incorporates Statewide, Regional and local planning hierarchies, which follow the model of Victoria's VPP. The Coordinator General may still declare projects to be 'significant projects' which then require assessment under the State Development and Public Works Organisation Act 1971 (Qld).

== Europe ==
Over the past decade the European Union has given the environment more attention with more strict legislation on issues such as air, soil, and water pollution as well regulations for toxic and hazardous substances. Currently over 18% of the territory belonging to the EU is denoted as protected areas for nature. To date, the European Union's Environmental Policy is determined by the 7th Environmental Action Programme and is expected to be followed up through 2020. The EU has goals beyond this, however, and hopes by 2050 to have an "innovative, circular economy where nothing is wasted and where natural resources are managed sustainably, and biodiversity is protected, valued and restored in ways that enhance our society's resilience."

The EU has three core objectives to help achieve this vision: conservation of natural resources, conversion to an efficient, environmentally sustainable economy, and protection of the health of citizens.

== Professional qualifications ==
Environmental planning qualifications are offered in a number of forms by various universities throughout the world.

The following are some of the qualifications offered by tertiary education institutions:

- Bachelor of Resource and Environmental Planning
- Bachelor of Environmental Studies
- Bachelor of Planning and Environmental Policy
- Master in Environmental Planning e.g. at the Technische Universität Berlin
- Master in Environmental Studies (planning)
- Bachelor of Urban and Environmental Planning
- Master of Urban Planning

== See also ==
- Air quality – Presence of dangerous substances in the air
- Biogeochemistry – Study of chemical cycles of the earth related to biological activity
- Conservation development – Controlled-growth land use development
- Disaster mitigation – Reduction of something harmful or the reduction of its harmful effects
- Eco-sufficiency – Reduction in energy and resource consumption
- Ecology – Study of organisms and their environment
- Environmental design – Design process
- Green building – Environmentally responsible construction principles
- Green development – Real estate development concept
- Greening – Process of incorporating more environmentally friendly behaviors or systems
- Landscape planning – Branch of architecture
- List of environmental issues
- List of environmental organizations
- List of planning journals
- Natural landscape – Original landscape formed by nature
- Noise pollution – Excessive displeasing noise
- Passive solar building design – Architectural engineering that uses the Sun's heat without electric or mechanical systems
- Sustainable development – Mode of human development
- Sustainable habitat
- Smart growth – Urban planning philosophy
- The Merton Rule – Energy law in the United Kingdom
- Triad (environmental science)
- Timeline of environmental events
- Transition Towns – Community with core principles of self-sufficiency
- Urban design – Designing and shaping of human settlements
- Water quality – Assessment against standards for use

Cities

- Curitiba – a Brazilian city noted for its innovative public transit system and environmental planning.
- New York City – considered by many to be the most sustainable U.S. city with a population greater than one million because of its high population density and usage of mass transit.
- Reykjavík – the capital of Iceland known for its use of geothermal power.
