= Chemical waste =

Waste made from harmful chemicals

Chemical waste is any excess, unused, or unwanted chemical. Globally, there are about 350,000 officially registered chemicals. Of those, about 7,000 are designed to have biological activity: roughly 4,000 pesticides and 3,000 pharmaceuticals. Around 300,000 industrial chemicals are not designed for a biological activity, but may still have biological effects.

Chemical waste may be classified as hazardous waste, non-hazardous waste, universal waste, or household hazardous waste, each of which is regulated separately by national governments and the United Nations. Hazardous waste is material that displays one or more of the following four characteristics: ignitability, corrosivity, reactivity, and toxicity. This information, along with chemical disposal requirements, is typically available on a chemical's Safety Data Sheet (SDS). Radioactive and biohazardous wastes require additional or different methods of handling and disposal, and are often regulated differently than standard hazardous wastes.

== Laboratory chemical waste in the US ==
The U.S. Environmental Protection Agency (EPA) prohibits disposing of certain materials down drains. Therefore, when hazardous chemical waste is generated in a laboratory setting, it is usually stored on-site in appropriate waste containers, such as triple-rinsed chemical storage containers or carboys, where it is later collected and disposed of in order to meet safety, health, and legislative requirements. Many universities' Environment, Health, and Safety (EHS) divisions/departments serve this collection and oversight role.

Organic solvents and other organic waste is typically incinerated. Some chemical wastes are recycled, such as waste elemental mercury.

=== Laboratory waste containment ===
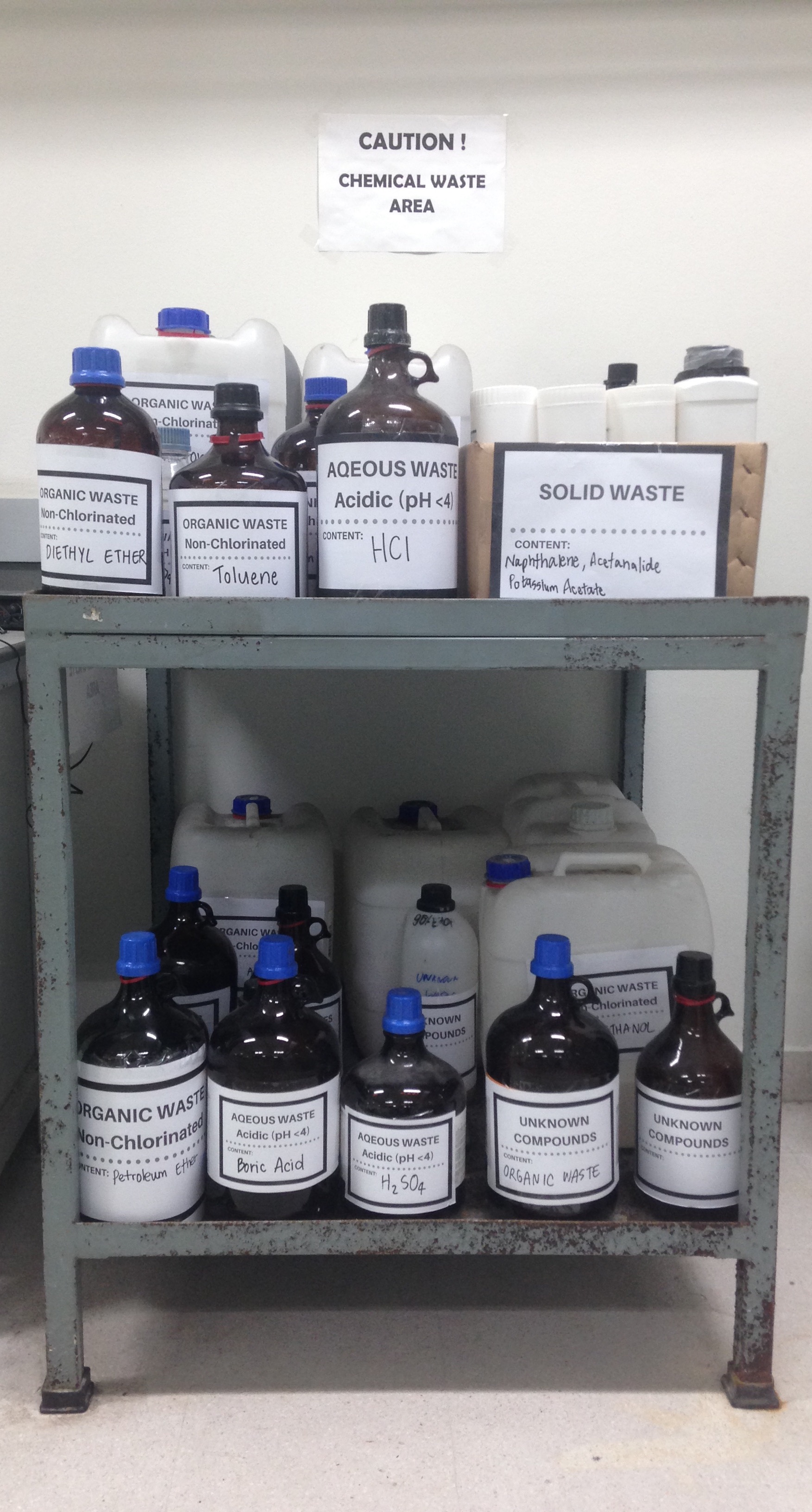
Laboratory waste containers

==== Packaging ====
During packaging, chemical liquid waste containers are filled to no greater than 75% capacity to allow for vapor expansion and to reduce potential spills that can occur from transporting or moving overfilled containers. Containers for chemical liquid waste are typically constructed from materials compatible with the hazardous waste being stored, such as inert materials like polypropylene (PP) or polytetrafluoroethylene (PTFE). These containers are also constructed of mechanically robust materials in order to minimize leakage during storage or transit.

In addition to the general packaging requirements mentioned above, precipitates, solids, and other non-fluid wastes are typically stored separately from liquid waste. Chemically contaminated glassware is disposed of separately from other chemical waste in containers that cannot be punctured by broken glass.

==== Labelling ====
Containers may be labelled with the group name from a list of chemical waste categories, along with an itemized list of the contents. All chemicals or materials contaminated by chemicals pose a significant hazard, and as such regulations require that the identity of the chemicals in a waste container is obvious.

==== Storage ====
Chemical waste containers are kept closed to prevent spillage, except when waste is being added. Suitable containers are labeled in order to inform disposal specialists of the contents as well as to prevent the addition of incompatible chemicals. Liquid waste is stored in containers with secure screw-top or similar lids that cannot be easily dislodged in transit. Solid waste is stored in various sturdy, chemically inert containers, such as large, sealed buckets or thick plastic bags. Secondary containment, such as trays or safety cabinets, are used to capture spills and leaks from the primary container and to segregate incompatible hazardous wastes, such as acids and bases.

=== Chemical compatibility guidelines ===
Many chemicals react adversely when combined. Incompatible chemicals are therefore stored in separate areas of laboratories.

Acids are separated from alkalis, metals, cyanides, sulfides, azides, phosphides, and oxidizers, as when acids combine with these types of compounds, violent exothermic reactions can occur. In addition, some of these reactions produce flammable gases, which, combined with the heat produced, may cause explosions. In the case of cyanides, sulfides, azides, phosphides, etc. Toxic gases are also produced.

Oxidizers are separated from acids, organic materials, metals, reducing agents, and ammonia, as when oxidizers combine with these types of compounds, flammable and sometimes toxic compounds can be created. Oxidizers also increase the likelihood that any flammable material present will ignite, seen most readily in research laboratories with improper storage of organic solvents.

== Environmental pollution ==
=== Pharmaceuticals ===
Pharmaceuticals comprise one of the few groups of chemicals that are specifically designed to act on living cells. They present a special risk when they persist in the environment.

With the exception of watercourses downstream of sewage treatment plants, the concentration of pharmaceuticals in surface and ground water is generally low. Concentrations in sewage sludge and in landfill leachate may be substantially higher and provide alternative routes for EPPPs to enter the human and animal food-chain.

However, even at very low environmental concentrations (often ug/L or ng/L), the chronic exposure to environmental pharmaceuticals chemicals can add to the effects of other chemicals in the cocktail is still not studied. The different chemicals might be potentiating synergistic effects (higher than additive effects). An extremely sensitive group in this respect are foetuses.

EPPPs are already found in water all over the world. The diffuse exposure might contribute to

- extinction of species and imbalance of sensible ecosystems, as many EPPPs affect the reproductive systems of for example frogs, mussels, and fish;
- genetic, developmental, immune and hormonal health effects to humans and other species, in the same way as e.g. oestrogen-like chemicals;
- development of microbes resistant to antibiotics, as is found in India.

==== PPCPs ====
The use of pharmaceutical and personal care products (PPCPs) is on the rise, with an estimated increase from 2 billion to 3.9 billion annual prescriptions between 1999 and 2009 in the USA alone. PPCPs enter the environment through individual human activity and as residues from manufacturing, agribusiness, veterinary use, and hospital and community use. In Europe, the input of pharmacological residues via domestic waste water is estimated to be around 80%, whereas 20% comes from hospitals. Individuals may add PPCPs to the environment through waste excretion and bathing as well as by direct disposal of unused medications to septic tanks, sewers, or trash. Because PPCPs tend to dissolve relatively easily and do not evaporate at normal temperatures, they often end up in soil and waters.

Some PPCPs are broken down or processed easily by a human or animal body and/or degrade quickly in the environment. However, others do not break down or degrade easily. The likelihood or ease with which an individual substance will break down depends on its chemical makeup and the metabolic pathway of the compound.

==== River pollution ====
In 2022, the most comprehensive study of pharmaceutical pollution of the world's rivers finds that it threatens "environmental and/or human health in more than a quarter of the studied locations". It investigated 1,052 sampling sites along 258 rivers in 104 countries, representing the river pollution of 470 million people. It found that "the most contaminated sites were in low- to middle-income countries and were associated with areas with poor wastewater and waste management infrastructure and pharmaceutical manufacturing" and lists the most frequently detected and concentrated pharmaceuticals.

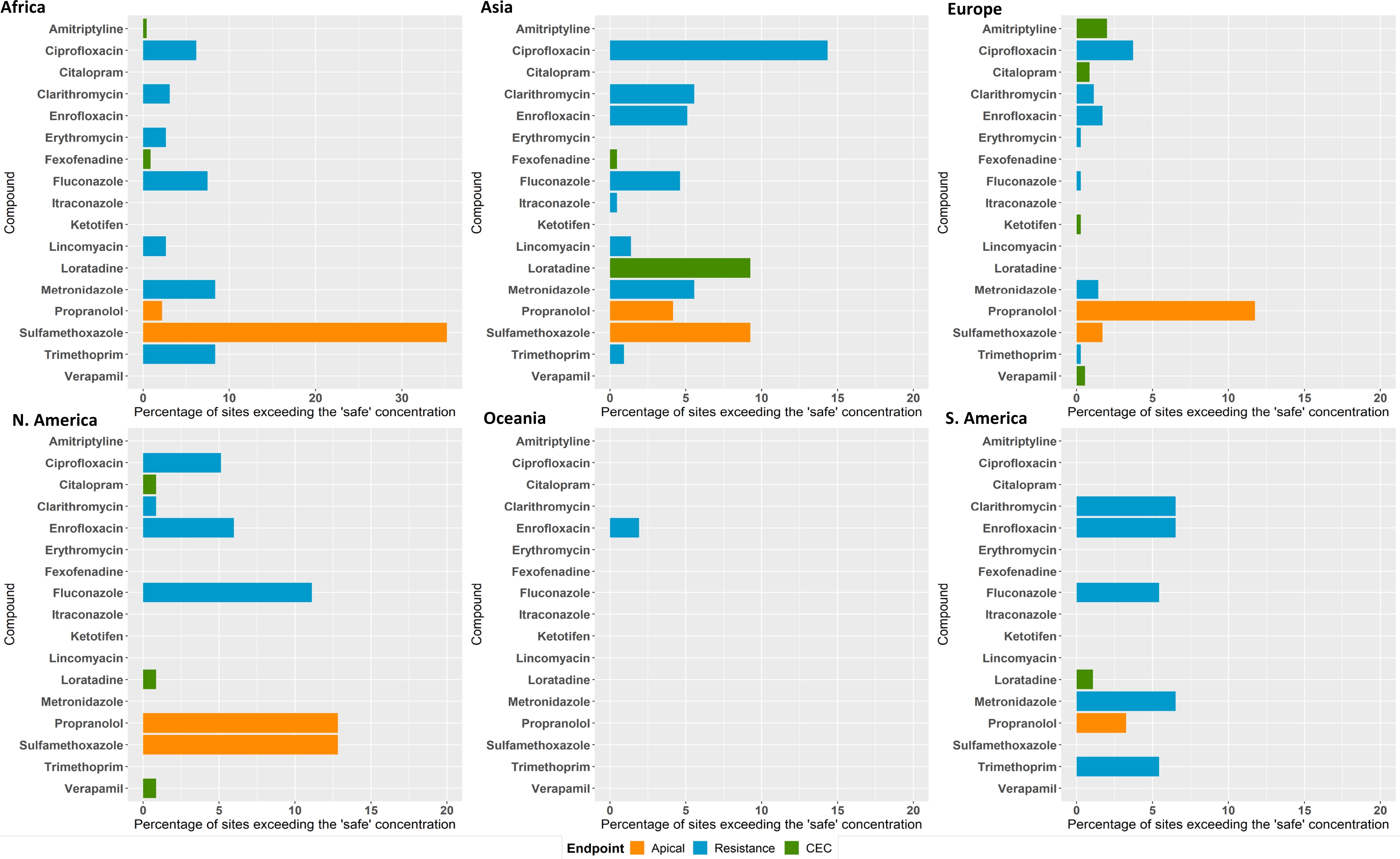
Pharmaceutical pollution of the world's rivers by chemical and region

=== Textile industry ===
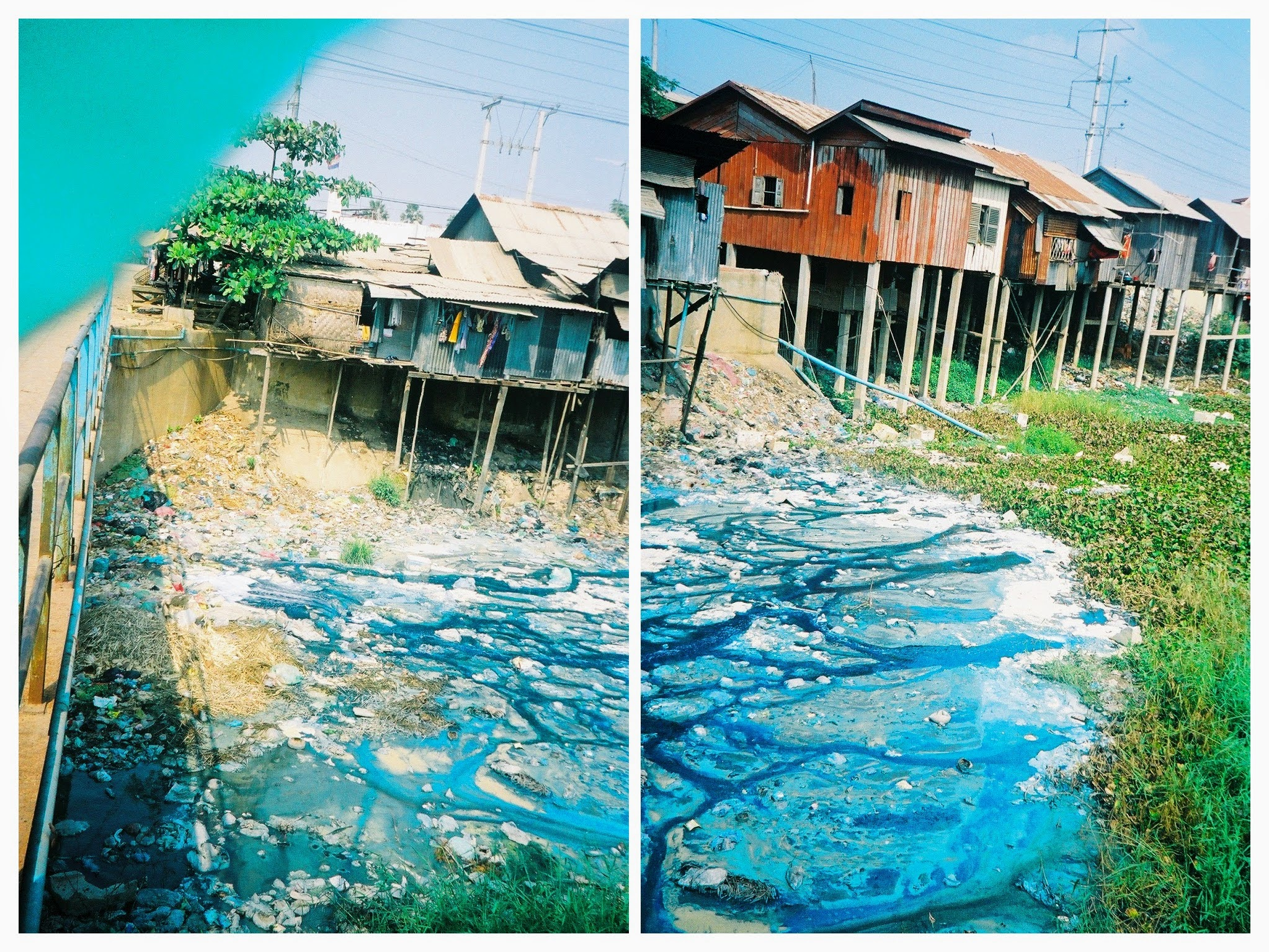
Indigo color water pollution in Phnom Penh, Cambodia, 2005

The textile industry is one of the largest polluters in the globalized world of mostly free market dominated socioeconomic systems. Chemically polluted textile wastewater degrades the quality of the soil and water. The pollution comes from the type of conduct of chemical treatments used e.g., in pretreatment, dyeing, printing, and finishing operations that many or most market-driven companies use despite "eco-friendly alternatives". Textile industry wastewater is considered to be one the largest polluters of water and soil ecosystems, causing "carcinogenic, mutagenic, genotoxic, cytotoxic and allergenic threats to living organisms". The textile industry uses over 8000 chemicals in its supply chain, also polluting the environment with large amounts of microplastics and has been identified in one review as the industry sector producing the largest amount of pollution.

A campaign of big clothing brands like Nike, Adidas and Puma to voluntarily reform their manufacturing supply chains to commit to achieving zero discharges of hazardous chemicals by 2020 (global goal) appears to have failed.

The textile industry also creates a lot of pollution that leads to externalities which can cause large economic problems. The problem usually occurs when there is no division of ownership rights. This means that the problem of pollution is largely caused because of incomplete information about which company pollutes and at what scale the damage was caused by the pollution.

=== Planetary boundary ===
A study by "Scienmag" defines a 'planetary boundary' for novel entities such as plastic and chemical pollution. The study reported that the boundary has been crossed.

== Regulation of chemical waste ==
Chemicals waste may fall under regulations such as COSHH in the United Kingdom or the Clean Water Act and Resource Conservation and Recovery Act in the United States. In the U.S., the Environmental Protection Agency (EPA) and the Occupational Safety and Health Administration (OSHA), as well as state and local regulations, also regulate chemical use and disposal.

=== Chemical waste in Canadian aquaculture ===
Chemical waste in oceans is becoming a major issue for marine life. There have been many studies conducted to try and prove the effects of chemicals in oceans. In Canada, many of the studies concentrated on the Atlantic provinces, where fishing and aquaculture are an important part of the economy. In New Brunswick, a study was done on sea urchins in an attempt to identify the effects of toxic and chemical waste on life beneath the ocean, specifically the waste from salmon farms. Sea urchins were used to check the levels of metals in the environment. Green sea urchins have been used as they are widely distributed, abundant in many locations, and easily accessible. By investigating the concentrations of metals in the green sea urchins, the impacts of chemicals from salmon aquaculture activity could be assessed and detected. Samples were taken at 25-meter intervals along a transect in the direction of the main tidal flow. The study found that there were impacts to at least 75 meters based on the intestine metal concentrations.

== See also ==
- Industrial waste
- List of waste types
- Municipal solid waste
- Radioactive waste
- Toxic waste
- Waste management
- Water pollution
