= Community boards of New York City =

Structures in New York City's government

Map of community districts in the City of New York The Bronx Brooklyn Manhattan Queens Staten Island

The community boards of the New York City government are the appointed advisory groups of the community districts of the five boroughs. There are currently 59 community districts: twelve in the Bronx, eighteen in Brooklyn, twelve in Manhattan, fourteen in Queens, and three in Staten Island.

They advise on land use and zoning, participate in the city budget process, and address service delivery in their district. Regarding land use they are only advisory and mostly serve as mobilizing institutions for communities opposed to specific projects. The City Charter also allows boards to submit their own plans for the development, growth, and improvement of their communities.

Community boards each have up to 50 volunteer members appointed by the local borough president, half from nominations by City Council members representing the community district (i.e., whose council districts cover part of the community district). Non-board members may also join or work on board committees.

Each community board is led by a district manager, with an office and staff, whose primary purpose is to coordinate the delivery of services to the community. Each borough also has a borough board, composed of the borough president, council members from the borough, and the chairperson of each community board in the borough.

== Responsibilities ==
Community Boards are defined as public bodies and governmental agencies under law, however they act in an advisory capacity, wielding no official authority to make or enforce laws.

=== Land use and zoning ===
Under the City Charter's Uniform Land Use Review Procedure (ULURP), after the Department of City Planning certifies as complete an application respecting the use, development, or improvement of real property, affected community boards (along with borough boards) may hold public hearings and submit recommendations for consideration to the City Planning Commission before its decision. Such applications include those that involve city land or facilities, changes to zoning, and the use of public street and sidewalks.

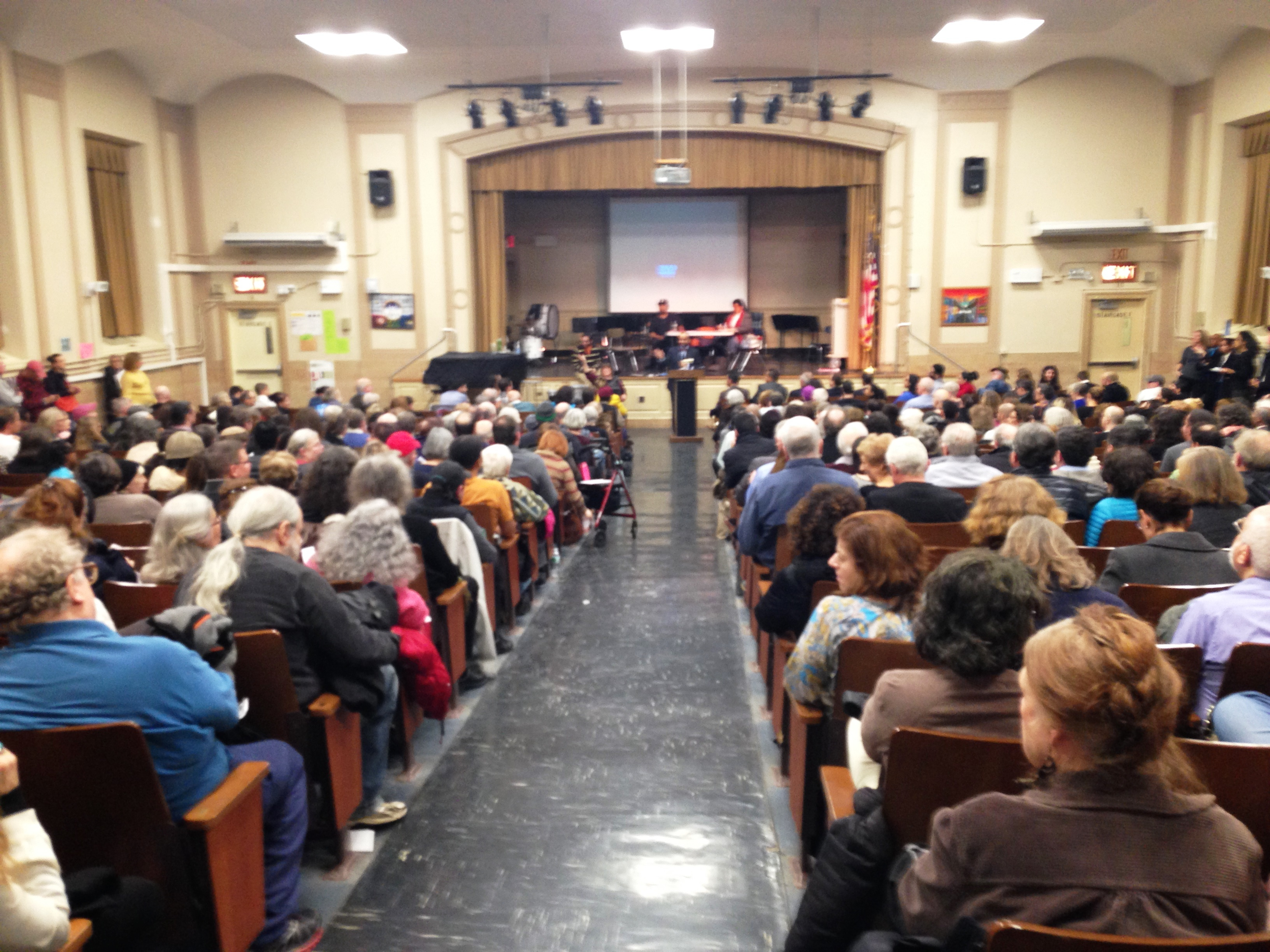
A February 2016 meeting of Manhattan Community Board 12

The Board of Standards and Appeals generally has jurisdiction over special-use permits of a local nature (along with zoning variances), such as for gas stations, clubs, camps and public utility installations, and its approval process deviates from the ULURP by allowing community and borough boards to review and recommend applications; the City Planning Commission retains jurisdiction for projects that have greater impact or involve planning issues beyond the local neighborhood. Projects that are "as-of-right" (i.e. the city has no discretion) are not subject to community review. The City Charter also allows community boards to submit their own plans for the development, growth, and improvement of their communities. However, few community boards have taken advantage of this ability.

Community boards serve as mobilizing institutions for communities opposed to specific projects. They allow the community to articulate their opposition, and when successful, developers or the city are forced to modify projects or negotiate with the community, sometimes through the board.

=== Service delivery ===
Each community board is led by a district manager, with an office and staff, whose primary purpose is to coordinate the delivery of services to the community. Each community district also has a district service cabinet (DSC) with representatives of agencies that deliver local services. In practice, boards serve in an outreach and complaint-handling capacity but have little substantive impact on tailoring service delivery.

=== City budget ===
Community boards assess the needs of their own neighborhoods, meet with city agencies and make recommendations in the city's budget process to address them. Although boards play a role in capital budgeting, their impact has been minimal.

==== Statement of Community District Needs ====
Annually, Community boards evaluate the needs of their neighborhoods through the Statement of Community District Needs. The information provided in the statements is helpful in allocating and prioritizing infrastructure repairs and improvements, and for delivering services. City agencies are required to provide a response to all requests, regardless of whether there is sufficient funding available. Formally boards are supported by the Department of City Planning (DCP) through training, guidance, and compiling its document with additional demographic and district data. Boards constantly gather needs of improvements to capital investment and government services through its various committees and meetings held throughout the year. Public hearings are held by the boards to allow a chance for the public community input between September and October before the final submission.

From June to August, boards review their needs within and consult with agencies on the capital and expense priorities through two opportunities, one in the late Spring at the board/district level with district managers and committee members; and the other in September and October at the borough level. Draft submissions are submitted for feedback between August and September.

By late October, the final submission is sent to DCP and requests are reviewed by the Mayor's Office of Management and Budget (OMB). Between January and March agencies respond and boards will have an opportunity to reply back.

The Mayor releases the preliminary budget by January 16 which includes agency funding recommendations from community board requests. A month later by February 15, public hearings are held by the boards to create an assessment of responsiveness of the preliminary budget. In the same month, a compressive statement is submitted by the borough board, outlining budget priorities of the borough prior to Borough President's executive budget submission. In May, the City Council holds public hearings on the Executive Budget before the Mayor's Executive Budget published on April 26 and the budget is adopted by the City Council on June 5.

In June, OMB publishes the Register of Community Board Requests for the Executive Budget containing the final dispositions are released for boards to review and used reevaluate needs in the next cycle.

== Structure ==
| Borough | Borough President (B.P.) | Number of Districts | Max. number of all appointees |
|---|---|---|---|
| The Bronx | Vanessa Gibson | 12 | 600 |
| Brooklyn | Antonio Reynoso | 18 | 900 |
| Manhattan | Brad Hoylman-Sigal | 12 | 600 |
| Queens | Donovan Richards | 14 | 700 |
| Staten Island | Vito Fossella | 3 | 150 |

Each board is composed of up to 50 volunteer members, with half of the membership appointed by the local borough president each year. One half of the appointees are chosen on the volition of the borough president, and half from nominations by City Council members representing the community district (i.e., whose council districts cover part of the community district). Additionally, all City Council members representing the community district are non-voting, ex officio board members. Meetings occur once a month and are open to the public.

=== Board members ===
Board members are selected from among people who must reside, work, or have some other significant interest in the community district. The board members serve for two-year terms, staggered so that half of the full membership is up for appointment each year. The minimum age to become a board member was lowered to 16 years old in 2014. In November 2018 voters overwhelmingly approved term limits of 4 consecutive 2-years stints. After 2 years off the Board, members are eligible to be reappointed. Appointments to the board are usually made each spring.

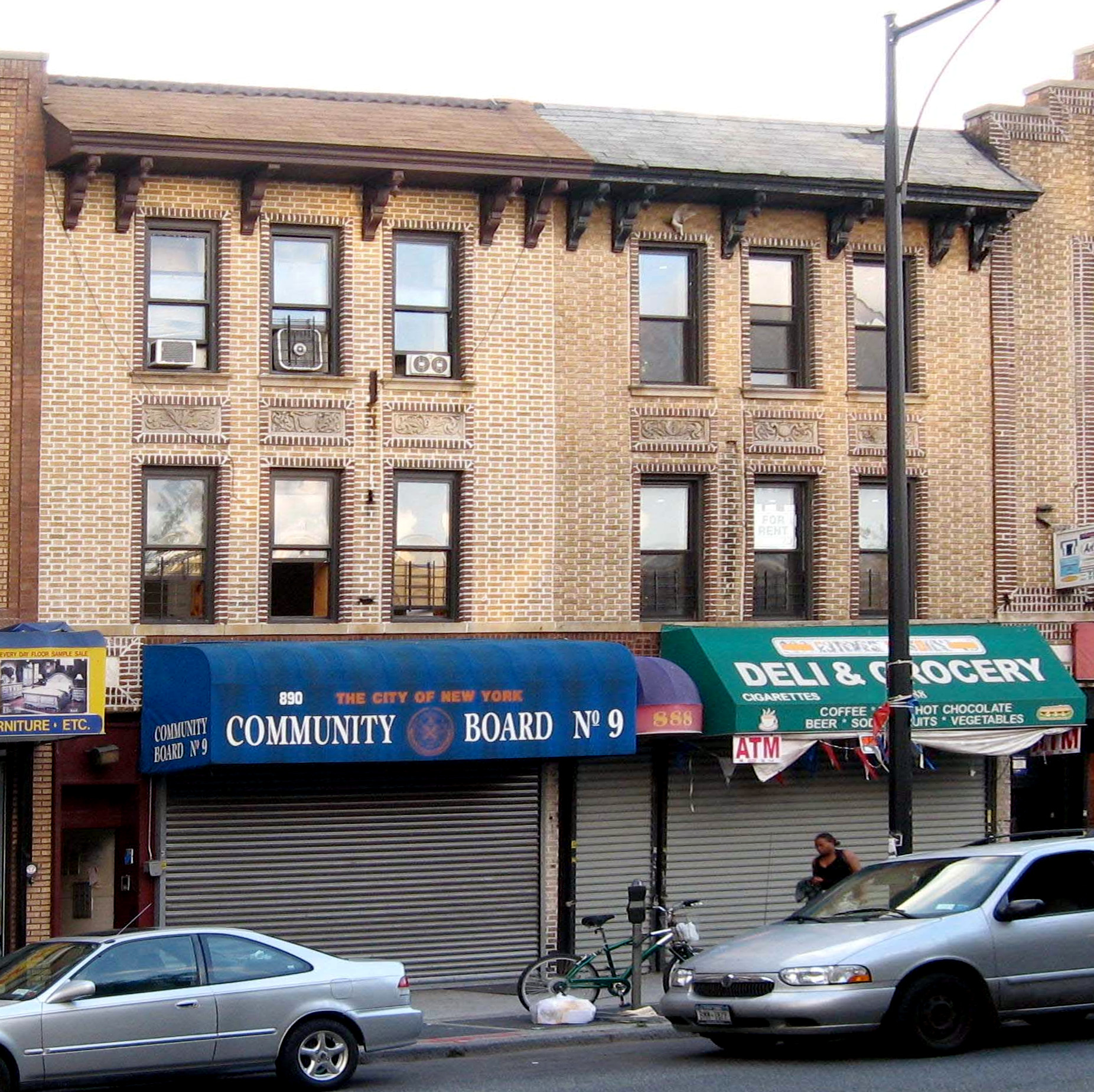
The district office (district manager's office) of Brooklyn Community Board 9

=== Committees ===
Each community board has committees that do most of the planning and work on the issues that are brought to action at board meetings. Committees may be functional committees that deal with specific New York City Charter mandates (e.g., land use review and budget committees), or agency committees that relate to a particular agency (e.g. police and sanitation committees), or otherwise. Non-board members may apply to join or work on board committees, which helps provide additional expertise and manpower.

=== Staff ===
Each community district is led by a district manager, with an office and staff, whose primary purpose is to coordinate the delivery of services to the community. While the main responsibility of the district manager's office is to receive complaints from community residents, they also process permits for block parties and street fairs, organize tenants associations, and coordinate neighborhood cleanup programs.

=== District service cabinet ===
Each community district also has a district service cabinet (DSC) that coordinates city services and programs, considers interagency problems and impediments, and plans multi-agency projects, within the district. Its members include the district manager, chairperson of the community board, representatives of the agencies that deliver local services to the community district, City Council members whose district includes any part of the community district, and a representative of the Department of City Planning. DSC meetings are not subject to New York's Open Meetings Law and therefore need not be open to the public.

== History ==
The 1898 Charter of the City of Greater New York gave the Municipal Assembly the power and duty to number and name 22 districts of local improvements, which were at that time coterminous with the senatorial districts of the city but whose boundaries the Municipal Assembly had the power to modify. Each district was under the purview of a Board of Local Improvements, also known as a "local board", which was composed of the district's Borough President and the members of the Municipal Assembly in the district, who all served without compensation. The 1901 Charter, effective January 1, 1902, increased the number of districts to 25 and gave them their numbers and names. These districts comprised various Wards of New York City and senatorial districts. The local boards remained composed of the Borough President and each alderman in the district, and they continued to serve in the boards without compensation. In 1918 their number was reduced to 24 and they were thereafter based on aldermanic districts.

The 1938 Charter imposed a City Council elected by borough-wide proportional representation; Local Improvement Boards thereafter comprised the Borough President and each member of the Council elected from the Borough, and numbered nine in Manhattan, eight in Brooklyn, four in the Bronx, two in Queens, and one in Staten Island.

The 1963 revision of the New York City Charter extended the Borough of Manhattan's "Community Planning Councils" (est. 1951) to the outer boroughs as "Community Planning Boards", which are now known as "Community Boards".

The 1975 revision of the New York City (NYC) Charter set the number of Community Districts/Boards to 59, established the position of the district manager for the community districts, and created the Uniform Land Use Review Procedure (ULURP) (pronounced "you-lurp") which gave the community boards the authority to review land use proposals such as zoning actions, and special permits.

The 1990 revision of the NYC Charter, in section 197-a, granted community boards the authority to prepare plans for development within their district, and submit them to the City Planning Commission and the city council for approval. Plans submitted under this rule are known as "197-a" plans.

The 2018 NYC Charter Revision Commission proposed term limits for community board members.

The term limits proposal was one of three measures pertaining to the Charter that were up for a vote as part of the November 2018 elections. It, additionally, required borough presidents to seek out persons of diverse backgrounds for appointment. NYC voters resoundingly elected to place term limits on community board members.

After Governor of New York Andrew Cuomo suspended in-person government meetings in 2020 by declaring a state of emergency at the dawn of the COVID-19 pandemic in New York, the City's 59 boards migrated to online video platforms such as Webex and Zoom. In 2021, when boards were threatened with the prospect of resuming meetings in person despite civic engagement soaring after going virtual and the ongoing health crisis, some openly declared their intent to break state law to keep meeting online, resulting in Governor Kathy Hochul signing legislation to extend virtual public meetings.

== See also ==
- Borough boards of New York City
- City Environmental Quality Review
- Community boards of the Bronx
- Community boards of Brooklyn
- Community boards of Manhattan
- Community boards of Queens
- Community boards of Staten Island
- Neighborhoods in New York City
- Uniform Land Use Review Procedure

== Bibliography ==
- The Charter of the City of New York, Chapter 378 of the Laws of 1897, With Amendments adopted by the Legislatures of 1898 and 1899. Brooklyn, New York: Brooklyn Daily Eagle. August 1899 – via HathiTrust.
- The Greater New York Charter of 1901. New York: The Lawyers' Co-Operative Publishing Company. 1901 – via HathiTrust.
