= Fluorescent lamp crusher =

A fluorescent lamp crusher is a device that crushes and stores spent fluorescent lamps prior to processing at a recycling facility, while controlling the release of mercury vapor emissions. Also known as drum-top crushing, this lamp disposal method is designed to reduce the storage, labor, and shipping costs of recycling lamps over other methods, as well as decrease the likelihood of mercury release during transport to a recycling facility. Fluorescent lamp crushers are designed for use primarily in commercial and institutional facility management contexts.

== Operation ==
A fluorescent lamp crusher consists of a vacuum-sealed container, often a 55-gallon steel drum, in which glass fragments collect after passing through an entry tube and crushing mechanism. The mercury content of the lamp is contained by the vacuum and trapped in a filter arrangement, which must be replaced periodically. Spent fluorescent lamps are typically hand-fed into the entry tube, rapidly drawn into the drum by the vacuum seal and crushed in the motorized crushing assembly. Once the storage container is full, it is replaced and shipped to a recycling facility for processing. Several companies manufacture fluorescent lamp crushers, including Dextrite, Air Cycle Corporation, and Resource Technologies.

== Regulations ==
Drum-top lamp crushing is regulated at the state level in the United States. State regulations must adhere to mercury emission standards developed by the U.S. Environmental Protection Agency. Some states prohibit crushing except by permit in belief that lamp crushers emit levels of mercury vapor higher than those established by the U.S. EPA. However, most states allow lamp crushing as treatment of either hazardous or universal waste.
