= New York City Department of City Planning =

New York City government agency

Department of City Planning

Department overview
- Jurisdiction: New York City
- Department executives: Sideya Sherman, City Planning Commission Chair; Edith Hsu-Chen, Department of City Planning Executive Director
- Key document: New York City Charter
- Website: www.nyc.gov/dcp

The Department of City Planning (DCP) is the department of the government of New York City responsible for setting the framework of city's physical and socioeconomic planning. The department is responsible for land use and environmental review, preparing plans and policies, and providing information to and advising the Mayor of New York City, Borough presidents, the New York City Council, Community Boards and other local government bodies on issues relating to the macro-scale development of the city. The department is responsible for changes in New York City's city map, purchase and sale of city-owned real estate and office space and of the designation of landmark and historic district status. Its regulations are compiled in title 62 of the New York City Rules.

Marisa Lago served as Director of City Planning and Chair of the City Planning Commission from 2014 until 2021, and she was succeeded by Anita Laremont who served from 2021 until 2022. Daniel Garodnick assumed these dual roles from February 2022 to March 2026. During his tenure, the department advanced several major planning initiatives, including the City of Yes zoning reforms and neighborhood plans for Atlantic Avenue, the East Bronx, Jamaica, Long Island City and Midtown South, as well as updates to land use review processes intended to speed housing production. Sideya Sherman succeeded Garodnick as Director of City Planning and Chair of the City Planning Commission in March 2026. Under her leadership, the department is advancing a citywide transit-oriented development initiative and implementing reforms to accelerate affordable housing production.

== City Planning Commission and the Plan for New York ==
The City Planning Commission was created under the 1936 New York City Charter. It started functioning in 1938 with seven members, all of whom were appointed by the Mayor and was given responsibility for creating a master plan.

The first such master plan was published in February 1969 and was called the Plan for New York. Part of the motivation for the plan was that a comprehensive plan was required in order for federal public housing funding. Unlike other master plans, it focused on social and economic issues. The City Council never adopted it.

The commission currently operates under the terms of the revised 1989 Charter, with 13 members. The board consists of a chair, who serves at the Mayor's pleasure, and 12 other members who serve terms in office of five years on a staggered basis. The Mayor appoints the chair, who serves ex officio as the Director of City Planning, and six other members. Each Borough President appoints one member. The New York City Public Advocate appoints one member. The current chair is Sideya Sherman.

== Greenmarkets ==
In 1976, after the original Greenmarket on 59th Street & 2nd Avenue proved to be successful, the New York City Department of City Planning proposed to the Council on the Environment of New York City opening a second farmers market in Union Square and a third market in Brooklyn. The Union Square farmers market was smaller and considerably less hectic than the 59th Street & 2nd Avenue location. The Brooklyn Market was large and nearly as successful and the 59th Street & 2nd Avenue location. The land where the Brooklyn Market was located was privately owned by the Brooklyn Academy of Music. The Union Square market and the 59th Street & 2nd Avenue market were publicly owned by the city.

== See also ==
- City Environmental Quality Review
- Uniform Land Use Review Procedure
