= Uniform Land Use Review Procedure =

1975 New York City legislation

New York City Council
- Territorial extent: New York City
- Enacted by: New York City Council
- Enacted: 1975
- Status: Current legislation

Uniform Land Use Review Procedure (ULURP) is a process mandated by the 1975 revision of the New York City Charter that is invoked when a proposed development will affect certain legal protections afforded to the existing area and/or its inhabitants. The standardization of the ULURP creates a democratizing aspect of greater public involvement and thus a degree of transparency into future effects of proposed developments that result in consequences as defined in section 197-c of the Charter. The process allows the affected the opportunity to stop a development, or find common-ground and come to a compromise with the developer, wherein the negative effects are acknowledged but allowed upon some quid-pro-quo concessional proposal change that allows the affected to accept the negative impacts in light of the positive concessions.

== Background ==
Prior to the creation of the Uniform Land Use Review Procedure (ULURP), the development and infrastructure decision making process was concentrated in the hands of bureaucrats such as Robert Moses, who made decisions with limited or no local input. ULURP specifies six phases in the procedure - each of which brings an additional local stakeholder into the development and infrastructure decision making process.

Developments that fall within current zoning rules are referred to as "As of right" developments, and do not go through the ULURP process. ULURP is only initiated when a change in zoning is required for the development.

== Phases of the ULURP process ==
The Uniform Land Use Review Procedure is made up of six phases, which can take up to 205 days to complete. The phases are:

=== NYC Department of City Planning certification ===
Application must be submitted and certified by the New York City Department of City Planning. Part of the submission includes a draft environmental impact statement.

=== Local Community board advisory review ===
The application is then submitted to the local community board, which must provide a non-binding review of the application within a 60 day period. Approval by the community board is not necessary for the application to proceed.

=== Borough president advisory review ===
The application is then brought to the local Borough president for advisory review within a 30 day period. Approval by the borough president is not necessary for the application to proceed.

=== New York City Planning Commission review ===
The application is then brought to the New York City Planning Commission (CPC) for review within a 60 day period. If the commission disapproves the application, then the process is effectively over, unless the city council decides to review the disapproved application.

=== New York City Council review ===
The application is then brought to the New York City Council for review within a 50 day period.

The usual custom of the Council is to defer to members who represent the area, i.e. member deference. Criticisms of member deference is that it allows vetos that increase uncertainty, incentivizes focus on short-term impacts, and prioritizes local concerns over citywide interests.

=== New York City Mayoral veto and review ===
The application is then brought to the New York City Mayor for review within a 5 day period. The mayor's approval is not necessary for the application to go forward, but a mayoral veto ends the process unless the city council decides to override the veto with a two-thirds vote.

== See also ==
- City Environmental Quality Review
- Community benefits agreement
- Land use
- PlaNYC
- Urban planning
- Urban renewal
- Variance (land use)
- Zoning in the United States
