= Association of Environmental Professionals =

US non-profit organization

The Association of Environmental Professionals (AEP) is a California-based non-profit organization of interdisciplinary professionals including environmental science, resource management, environmental planning and other professions contributing to this field. AEP is the first organization of its kind in the US, and its influence and model have spawned numerous other regional organizations throughout the United States, as well as the separate National Association of Environmental Professionals (NAEP). From inception in the mid-1970s the organization has been closely linked with the upkeep of the California Environmental Quality Act (CEQA), California being one of the first states to adopt a comprehensive law to govern the environmental review of public policy and project review.

== History, organization and governance ==
AEP was founded in the State of California in 1974 and held its first organization wide meeting of members in Palo Alto, California, on the Stanford University campus. At that meeting the first directors and officers were elected and by-laws adopted. From then on the board of directors has met quarterly to establish governance, coordinate legislative liaison and plan annual meeting. There are nine AEP chapters, covering the California geographical regions of: Channel Counties, Inland Empire, Los Angeles County, Monterey Bay-Silicon Valley, Orange County, San Diego, San Francisco Bay Area, Superior, and Central.

== Publications and member activities ==
AEP publishes a quarterly magazine, the Environmental Monitor, which contains technical articles, legislative updates and other information useful to its members. As mentioned above the organization has developed a skilled legislative advocacy program, which is remarkable in its pursuit of clarity of language, efficient functioning of environmental review and ethical goals for its profession. AEP also provides annual recognition awards for excellence in various categories, provides members with information on career development and works to achieve standards for performance in the environmental disciplines.

Articles may include topics of air quality, habitat conservation, water quality, archaeology, urban planning, acoustics and other technical matters; however coverage is also given to legislation, AEP activities and professional career development.

== See also ==
- Environmental engineering
- Environmental management
- Environmental studies
