= State Environmental Quality Review Act =

Newe York state environmental legislation

The State Environmental Quality Review Act (SEQRA) is a stipulation enacted by the state of New York that all local and state government agencies must uniformly reflect the environmental impacts when considering taking social and/or economic factors into action.

== History ==
In 1975, the state of New York passed the State Environmental Quality Review Act to better establish a process when looking to add new developments on a site. From 1976 to 2005 there have been alterations to the Changes or Applications and Amendments categories.

== Who must apply ==
This applies to any group that is deciding to approve a funded sponsored action through private or public financials. These groups include the following;

- Authorities
- Special boards
- Districts
- Local government
- State government

A Type I action is any class of actions that unavoidably is going to have significant impacts on the environment.

Type II actions are classified as the project not having any significant impacts on the surrounding environment, or actions that have been exempted from SEQRA reviews.

Any project or action classified under Type I has to follow SEQRA requirements.

== Enforcement ==
There is no one agency that has the power to enforce SEQRA. The formation of the legislation enables it to be self-enforcing. The agencies responsible for an action that falls under SEQRA requirements must under its own power meet these regulations. The regulations that are issued are provided through the Department of Environmental Conservation.

== Do not apply ==
If the project is listed under the statewide and agency SEQRA regulations under the Type II list, then it is determined not to have a large impact on the surrounding environment.

== Satisfying requirements ==
When going forward to satisfying the SEQRA requirements there is an 11 step process that you need to follow.

- Is the action being taken subject to SEQRA? If yes then it needs to be classified as a type II Action or Type I Action.
- The correct environmental assessment form needs to be completed and reviewed.
- A coordinated review is set up by all agencies involved in Type 1 Actions.
- This is the step where the agency that is taking the lead will make its determination on the significance.
- The preparation of the draft EIS is started by the lead agency or the applicant can.
- The lead agency that received the draft EIS has 45 days to review and see if it is the draft is adequate for public review.
- The publishing notice that the EIS has been accepted for the public review.
- After the notice of complete of the EIS a public comment period then begins.
- A debate on whether a public hearing should be held.
- This is where the lead agency is held accountable for checking the precision on the final EIS statement. This should be finalized 45 days after the final hearings or 60 days after the filing of the draft EIS.
- The final step is involves each agency writing their own SEQRA findings statement for that project. This has to be completed after the final EIS statement and before the final decision the agency makes. Findings certify that the project has met requirements of Part 617.

== Critical areas ==
These are specific geographical areas that local agencies can deem Critical Environmental Areas (CEA). To designate an area to this stand it must have one or more of the following characteristics;

1. a threat or benefit to human well-being,
2. a natural setting that includes things such as areas of important aesthetics or scenic quality, wildlife habitat, and vegetation,
3. values that include agricultural, cultural, archaeological, historic, or educational qualities, or
4. an essential geological, ecological, or hydrological sensitivity that can be altered by any change around it.

== See also ==
City Environmental Quality Review – New York City's implementation of the State Environmental Quality Review Act mandate.
