= Hazardous waste =

Ignitable, reactive, corrosive and/or toxic unwanted or unusable materials

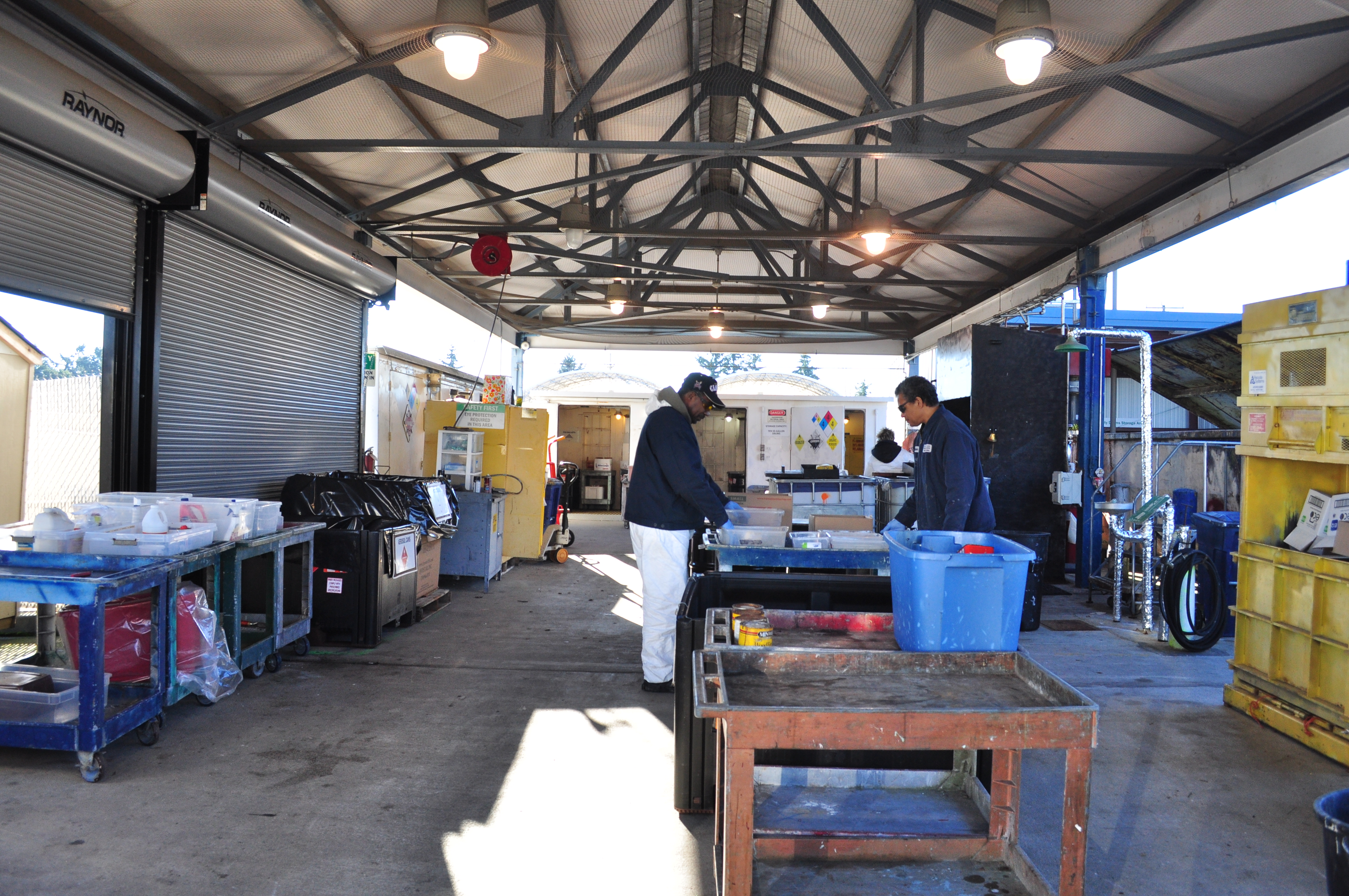
North Seattle household hazardous waste collection facility.

Hazardous waste is waste that can damage human health or the environment. Waste can be hazardous because it is toxic, reactive, or corrosive, etc. As of 2022, humanity produces 300–500 million metric tons of hazardous waste annually. Some common sources of hazardous wastes are solvents, batteries, and byproducts of metal refining. Hazardous waste is regulated on local, national, and international scales.

== Types ==
=== Universal wastes ===
Universal wastes are a special category of hazardous wastes that (in the U.S.) generally pose a lower threat relative to other hazardous wastes, are ubiquitous and produced in very large quantities by a large number of generators. Some of the most common "universal wastes" are: fluorescent light bulbs, some specialty batteries (e.g. lithium or lead containing batteries), cathode-ray tubes, and mercury-containing devices.

Universal wastes are subject to somewhat less stringent regulatory requirements. Small quantity generators of universal wastes may be classified as "conditionally exempt small quantity generators" (CESQGs) which release them from some of the regulatory requirements for the handling and storage hazardous wastes. Universal wastes must still be disposed of properly.

== Case studies ==
Domestic and industrial groups consume large amounts of lubricants. It is estimated that only half of that material is recovered, the remainder is waste. Recovered lubricants require treatment, and the treated product is less valuable than the original.

== Disposal ==
Historically, some hazardous wastes were disposed of in regular landfills. Hazardous wastes must often be stabilized and solidified in order to enter a landfill and must undergo different treatments in order to stabilize and dispose of them. Most flammable materials can be recycled into industrial fuel. Some materials with hazardous constituents can be recycled, such as lead acid batteries. Many landfills require countermeasures against groundwater contamination. For example, a barrier has to be installed along the foundation of the landfill to contain the hazardous substances that may remain in the disposed waste.

=== Recycling ===
Some hazardous wastes can be recycled into new products. Examples may include lead–acid batteries or electronic circuit boards. When heavy metals in these types of ashes go through the proper treatment, they could bind to other pollutants and convert them into easier-to-dispose solids, or they could be used as pavement filling. Such treatments reduce the level of threat of harmful chemicals, like fly and bottom ash, while also recycling the safe product.

=== Incineration ===
Incinerators burn hazardous waste at high temperatures (1600–2500 °F, 870–1400 °C), greatly reducing its amount by decomposing it into ash and gases. Incineration works with many types of hazardous waste, including contaminated soil, sludge, liquids, and gases. An incinerator can be built directly at a hazardous waste site, or more commonly, waste can be transported from a site to a permanent incineration facility.

The ash and gases leftover from incineration can also be hazardous. Metals are not destroyed, and can either remain in the furnace or convert to gas and join the gas emissions. The ash needs to be stored in a hazardous waste landfill, although it takes less space than the original waste. Incineration releases gases such as carbon dioxide, nitrogen oxides, ammonia, and volatile organic compounds. Reactions in the furnace can also form hydrochloric acid gas and sulfur dioxide. To avoid releasing hazardous gases and solid waste suspended in those gases, modern incinerators are designed with systems to capture these emissions.

=== Landfill ===
Hazardous waste may be sequestered in a hazardous waste landfill or permanent disposal facility. "In terms of hazardous waste, a landfill is defined as a disposal facility or part of a facility where hazardous waste is placed or on land and which is not a pile, a land treatment facility, a surface impoundment, an underground injection well, a salt dome formation, a salt bed formation, an underground mine, a cave, or a corrective action management unit (40 CFR 260.10)."

=== Pyrolysis ===
Some hazardous waste types may be eliminated using pyrolysis in a high temperature not necessarily through electrical arc but starved of oxygen to avoid combustion. However, when electrical arc is used to generate the required ultra heat (in excess of 3000 °C) all materials (waste) introduced into the process will melt into a molten slag and this technology is termed Plasma not pyrolysis. Plasma technology produces inert materials and when cooled solidifies into rock like material. These treatment methods are very expensive but may be preferable to high temperature incineration in some circumstances such as in the destruction of concentrated organic waste types, including PCBs, pesticides and other persistent organic pollutants.

== In society ==
=== Management and health effects ===
Hazardous waste management and disposal comes with consequences if not done properly. If disposed of improperly, hazardous gaseous substances can be released into the air resulting in higher morbidity and mortality. These gaseous substances can include hydrogen chloride, carbon monoxide, nitrogen oxides, sulfur dioxide, and some may also include heavy metals. With the prospect of gaseous material being released into the atmosphere, several organizations (RCRA, TSCA, HSWA, CERCLA) developed an identification scale in which hazardous materials and wastes are categorized in order to be able to quickly identify and mitigate potential leaks. F-List materials were identified as non-specific industrial practices waste, K-List materials were wastes generated from specific industrial processes - pesticides, petroleum, explosive industries, and the P & U list were commercially used generated waste and shelf stable pesticides. Not only can mismanagement of hazardous wastes cause adverse direct health consequences through air pollution, mismanaged waste can also contaminate groundwater and soil. In an Austrian study, people who live near industrial sites are "more often unemployed, have lower education levels, and are twice as likely to be immigrants." This creates disproportionately larger issues for those who depend heavily on the land for harvests and streams for drinking water; this includes Native American populations. Though all lower-class and/or social minorities are at a higher risk for being exposed to toxic exposure, Native Americans are at a multiplied risk due to the facts stated above (Brook, 1998). Improper disposal of hazardous waste has resulted in many extreme health complications within certain tribes. Members of the Mohawk Nation at Akwesasne have suffered elevated levels of PCB [Polychlorinated Biphenyls] in their bloodstreams leading to higher rates of cancer.

=== Global goals ===
The UN has a mandate on hazardous substances and wastes with recommendations to countries for dealing with hazardous waste. 199 countries signed the 1992 Basel Convention, seeking to stop the flow of hazardous waste from developed countries to developing countries with less stringent environmental regulations.

The international community has defined the responsible management of hazardous waste and chemicals as an important part of sustainable development by including it in Sustainable Development Goal 12. Target 12.4 of this goal is to "achieve the environmentally sound management of chemicals and all wastes throughout their life cycle". One of the indicators for this target is: "hazardous waste generated per capita; and proportion of hazardous waste treated, by type of treatment".

== Regulatory history ==
=== In the United States ===
==== Resource Conservation and Recovery Act (RCRA) ====
In the US, hazardous wastes are regulated under the Resource Conservation and Recovery Act (RCRA), Subtitle C. Hazardous wastes are wastes with properties that make them dangerous or potentially harmful to human health or the environment. Hazardous wastes can be liquids, solids, contained gases, or sludges. They can be by-products of manufacturing processes or simply discarded commercial products, like cleaning fluids or pesticides. In regulatory terms, RCRA hazardous wastes are wastes that appear on one of the four hazardous wastes lists (F-list, K-list, P-list, or U-list), or exhibit at least one of the following four characteristics; ignitability, corrosivity, reactivity, or toxicity.

By definition, EPA determined that some specific wastes are hazardous. These wastes are incorporated into lists published by the Agency. These lists are organized into three categories: F-list (non-specific source wastes) found in the regulations at 40 CFR 261.31, K-list (source-specific wastes) found in the regulations at 40 CFR 261.32, and P-list and the U-list (discarded commercial chemical products) found in the regulations at 40 CFR 261.33.

RCRA's record keeping system helps to track the life cycle of hazardous waste and reduces the amount of hazardous waste illegally disposed.

==== Comprehensive Environmental Response, Compensation, and Liability Act ====
The Comprehensive Environmental Response, Compensation, and Liability Act (CERCLA) was enacted in 1980. The primary contribution of CERCLA was to create a "Superfund" and provide for the clean-up and remediation of closed and abandoned hazardous waste sites. CERCLA addresses historic releases of hazardous materials, but does not specifically manage hazardous wastes.

=== In India ===
==== Environmental Act and Hazardous Waste Rules ====
In 1984, a deadly methyl isocyanate gas leak known as the Bhopal disaster raised environmental awareness in India. In response, the Indian government produced the Environmental Act in 1986, followed by the Hazardous Waste Rules in 1989. With these rules, companies are only permitted by the state to produce hazardous waste if they are able to dispose of it safely. However, state governments did not make these rules effective. There was around a decade delay between when hazardous waste landfills were requested and when they were built. During this time, companies disposed hazardous waste in various "temporary" hazardous waste locations, such as along roads and in canal pits, with no immediate plan to move it to proper facilities.

==== Supreme Court action ====
The Supreme Court stepped in to prevent damage from hazardous waste in order to protect the right to life. A 1995 petition by the Research Foundation for Science, Technology, and Natural Resource Policy spurred the Supreme Court to create the High Powered Committee (HPC) of Hazardous Waste, since data from pre-existing government boards was not usable. This committee found studies linking pollution and improper waste treatment with higher amounts of hexavalent chromium, lead, and other heavy metals. Industries and regulators were effectively ignoring these studies. In addition, the state was also not acting in accordance with the Basel Convention, an international treaty on the transport of hazardous waste. The Supreme Court modified the Hazardous Waste Rules and began the Supreme Court Monitoring Committee to follow up on its decisions. With this committee, the Court has been able to force companies polluting hazardous wastes to close.

== Country examples ==
=== United States ===
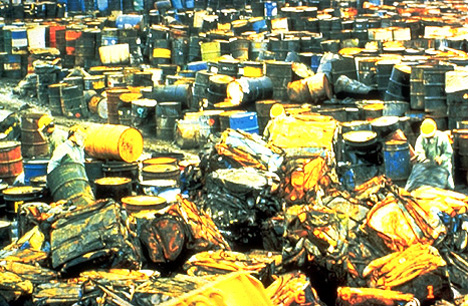
The Valley of the Drums, a toxic waste dump in northern Bullitt County, Kentucky

In the United States, the treatment, storage, and disposal of hazardous waste are regulated under the Resource Conservation and Recovery Act (RCRA). Hazardous wastes are defined under RCRA in 40 CFR 261 and divided into two major categories: characteristic and listed.

The requirements of the RCRA apply to all the companies that generate hazardous waste and those that store or dispose of hazardous waste in the United States. Many types of businesses generate hazardous waste. Dry cleaners, automobile repair shops, hospitals, exterminators, and photo processing centers may all generate hazardous waste. Some hazardous waste generators are larger companies such as chemical manufacturers, electroplating companies, and oil refineries.

A U.S. facility that treats, stores, or disposes of hazardous waste must obtain a permit under the RCRA. Generators and transporters of hazardous waste must meet specific requirements for handling, managing, and tracking waste. Through the RCRA, Congress directed the United States Environmental Protection Agency (EPA) to create regulations to manage hazardous waste. Under this mandate, the EPA has developed strict requirements for all aspects of hazardous waste management, including treating, storing, and disposing of hazardous waste. In addition to these federal requirements, states may develop more stringent requirements that are broader in scope than the federal regulations. Furthermore, RCRA allows states to develop regulatory programs that are at least as stringent as RCRA, and after review by EPA, the states may take over responsibility for implementing the requirements under RCRA. Most states take advantage of this authority, implementing their own hazardous waste programs that are at least as stringent and, in some cases, stricter than the federal program.

The U.S. government provides several tools for mapping hazardous wastes to particular locations. These tools also allow the user to view additional information.

- TOXMAP was a Geographic Information System (GIS) service from the Division of Specialized Information Services of the United States National Library of Medicine (NLM) that used maps of the United States to help users visually explore data from the United States Environmental Protection Agency's (EPA) Toxics Release Inventory and Superfund Basic Research Program. The US Federal Government funded this resource. TOXMAP's chemical and environmental health information was taken from NLM's Toxicology Data Network (TOXNET), PubMed, and other authoritative sources.
- The US Environmental Protection Agency (EPA) "Where You Live" allows users to select a region from a map to find information about Superfund sites in that region.

== See also ==
- Toxic waste
- Bamako Convention
- Brownfield Regulation and Development
- Environmental hazard
- Environmental remediation
- Environmental racism
- Gade v. National Solid Wastes Management Association
- List of solid waste treatment technologies
- List of Superfund sites in the United States
- List of waste management companies
- List of waste management topics
- List of waste types
- Mixed waste (radioactive/hazardous)
- National Priorities List (in the US)
- Pollution
- Recycling
- Retail hazardous waste
- Toxicity characteristic leaching procedure
- Triad (environmental science)
- Vapor intrusion
