= Triad (environmental science) =

The Triad is an approach by the United States Environmental Protection Agency to decision-making for hazardous-waste site cleanup. During the late 1990s, technology advocates from the environmental sector in the United States developed the approach by combining innovations in management and technology with ideas from hazardous-waste site cleanup experience.

Their goal was to form a framework for real-time environmental sensors and tools, to improve decision-making at contaminated sites. This resulted in a more formalized set of ideas in 2001 that soon became known as the Triad approach. The ideas spawned a Community of Practice by 2005.

The Triad Community of Practice includes representatives of federal, state, and private sector organizations in the U.S. and abroad. By 2008, a European CoP had been formed In 2008, a technical conference led largely by the CoP and covering the Triad Approach was held at the University of Massachusetts in Amherst, "Triad Investigations: New Approaches and Innovative Strategies."

The term Triad represents three elements: systematic project planning (SPP), dynamic work strategies, and innovative rapid sampling and analytical technologies. While elements of the Triad have long been used for site cleanup, Triad packages these best management practices together with the guiding principles:

1. Use a planning process, which includes participation of all stakeholders (including a multidisciplinary project team, federal and state regulators, legal counsel, community members, and other environmental professionals), to determine the types of data required and to evaluate whether the site could benefit from real-time measurement technologies.
2. Discussion of uncertainty management, data representativeness, and site closure strategies.
3. Use of a site model that recognizes site characterization is an element used at all stages of remediation.
4. Use of sampling, measurement, and data management technologies to support uncertainty management strategies.
5. Project teams that have communication, trust, discussion of individual interests and goals, and expertise in the appropriate fields.

Triad is an open-marketplace idea that is not owned by one entity. There is considerable U.S. Multiagency support for Triad. Beginning in 2006, the U.S. Environmental Protection Agency Office of Superfund Remediation and Technology Innovation expressed support of Triad by requesting the cooperation of its regional managers to expand the use of Triad at Superfund sites, where appropriate.

== Elements of the Triad ==
Although the following elements are the legs that gave the impetus for calling the process "Triad," the goal of the Triad approach is to infuse the concepts into hazardous-waste site cleanups, no matter what the lead organization calls the process. (U.S. Army Corps of Engineers Technical Project Planning Process (TPP) for systematic planning, for example.)

=== Systematic Project Planning ===
Project planning identifies the problems and encourages stakeholders to negotiate the steps necessary to mediate the risks the environmental contamination poses to human health and ecology. The specific goals of a project (redevelopment, revitalization, etc.) may differ, but the specific objectives during the SPP process are:

- Frame the problem: identify project objectives, constraints, stakeholders, the regulatory framework, and primary/secondary decisions.
- Develop a site model: construct and maintain a site model that captures information pertinent to the primary/secondary decisions that must be made. The term CSM is updated by identifying data gaps, and developing a dynamic work strategy to fill in the data gaps.
- Evaluate and manage uncertainty: evaluate and manage the uncertainty associated with decision-making in the context of the CSM so that decisions can be made with acceptable levels of confidence.

=== Dynamic work strategies ===
Dynamic work strategies are strategies that can be adapted to site conditions as new information becomes available while work is underway. This adaptation may be in response to data collection activities designed to address CSM unknowns, or it may be in response to completely unexpected site conditions encountered during the course of work.

Dynamic work strategies as part of a Triad approach can be included in almost every activity associated with hazardous waste site characterization and remediation. This includes overall project strategies, dynamic sampling and analysis programs (DSP, ASAP) for characterization purposes, remedial action design, implementation, and performance monitoring, long-term monitoring for sites that require it, closure plans, and quality assurance/quality control activities.

=== Innovative rapid sampling ===
Sometimes referred to as 'real-time' measurement systems, these are analytical or measurement technologies capable of producing data quickly enough to direct the progress of field activities (characterization or remediation) while they are underway , analogous to Real-time business intelligence. Example analytical methods include portable or handheld X-ray Fluorescence (pXRF XRF), portable gas chromatograph and mass spectrometry (GC-MS) technologies, and immunoassay test kits. New field analytical methods are fast developing. However, some have used standard laboratory approaches with quick turn-around results. The analysis enables in-field decision-making and ensures logical internal consistency among Triad concepts.

== Conceptual site models ==
At the core of each project is the conceptual site model (CSM). The term CSM is sometimes used to only describe pieces of the whole model. Geological, hydrogeological, contaminant fate and transport all may have computer models referred to as 'conceptual,' and a risk assessment may contain a CSM, but in a Triad sense, a CSM is the holistic model that can effectively portray site concerns significant to the decisions that must be made.
