= Universal waste =

Category of common waste materials designated as hazardous waste

Universal waste is a category of waste materials designated as "hazardous waste", but containing materials that are very common. It is defined in 40 CFR 273.9, by the United States Environmental Protection Agency but states may also have corollary regulations regarding these materials.

Universal waste includes:

- Batteries; lithium, Silver ion, nickel cadmium (Ni-Cad), mercury-oxide, or sealed lead-acid. Spent Lead-Acid Batteries being reclaimed do not need to be managed as universal waste.
- Pesticides; Stocks of a suspended and canceled pesticide that are part of a voluntary or mandatory recall
- Mercury Containing Equipment; a device or part of a device (including thermostats) that contains elemental mercury integral to its function.
- Lamps; include, but are not limited to, fluorescent, high intensity discharge, neon, mercury vapor, high pressure sodium, and metal halide lamps.
- Aerosol cans: a non-refillable receptacle containing a compressed gas, liquid, or solution under pressure for expelling a liquid, paste, or powder. These include, but are not limited to spray paints, lubricants, solvents, adhesives.

Businesses and other generators of such waste are required to provide for their proper disposal.
