= City Environmental Quality Review =

New York City Mayor
- Long title: Executive Order No. 91 (1991)
- Territorial extent: New York City
- Enacted by: New York City Mayor
- Effective: 1991
- Administered by: Mayor's Office of Environmental Coordination (MOEC)

Amended by
- Executive Order 97 of 2006; Executive Order 149 of 2011
- Status: In force

City Environmental Quality Review (CEQR) is a process New York City agencies must undergo to determine if any discretionary action they approved has any deteriorating impact on the environment. Projects that have to be reviewed by CEQR are either in need of permits or approval from a city agency, need city funding, or are directly undertaken by a city agency.

== History ==
In 1973, New York City put into place Executive Order No. 87, meaning that any city project being implemented must be assessed for the impact it could have on the environment. This initiative was in response to the country's National Environmental Policy Act (NEPA), which was enacted in 1970 and was one of the first national laws dedicated to protecting the environment. Continuing after that, in 1975 the State of New York put into place the State Environmental Quality Review Act (SEQR). SEQR required that state and local government agencies must review the environmental impact of any discretionary action before funding or approving that action.

From the SEQR came the CEQR in 1977. SEQR regulations allowed local governments to create their own environmental review procedures. Through the Executive Order No. 91, CEQR was established in New York City and so was the creation of a two co-lead agency system that would handle most of the environmental review functions. However, in 1991 the two co-lead agency system was replaced by a new system of lead agencies, where City agencies would act as the lead agency to any projects they wished to fund or implement.

== Environmental review process ==
An environmental review process starts when an agency proposes a project. In addition to the proposal, the agency must have a completed list of any permits, approvals, or funding needed to complete the project. The list will help guide the CEQR process; determining how intensely the CEQR process must be, or if a CEQR is even needed for a project.

Once the CEQR process begins, it is separated into two stages. The first stage is an initial assessment, known as the Environmental Assessment Statement (EAS), which discloses the description of the project and any potential impacts it could have. The EAS is then reviewed for any significant impacts that could arise and if any are found, the lead agency declares an Environmental Impact Statement (EIS) to be completed, which analyzes the impacts described in the EAS.

During the review, projects can be categorized into several defining labels. One label is Project Development, where the project is still being defined and the data is being gathered before the CEQR process. Another label is Active, where the CEQR process is in progress. On Hold, where the review has been suspended. Complete, when the CEQR process is completed. Withdrawn, where an applicant withdraws the review. Terminated, when the review, after 6 months of inactivity, becomes canceled. And Monitoring, when a project, which has completed the CEQR process, is tracked, making sure guidelines are being followed.

== Environmental aspects ==
When conducting the review, CEQR takes the following areas into account for their assessment:

- Land Use, Zoning, and Public Policy
- Socioeconomic Conditions
- Community Facilities and Services
- Open Space
- Shadows
- Historic and Cultural Resources
- Urban Design and Visual Resources
- Natural Resources
- Hazardous Materials
- Infrastructure
- Solid Waste and Sanitation Services
- Energy
- Transportation
- Air Quality
- Greenhouse gas emissions
- Noise
- Public Health
- Neighborhood Character
- Construction Impacts
