= Michael Brown =

Michael or Mike Brown may refer to:

== Academics ==
- Michael Barratt Brown (1918–2015), British economist, political activist and educator
- Michael Brown (physicist) (born 1946), vice-chancellor of Liverpool John Moores University
- Michael E. Brown (political scientist) (born 1959), American international affairs professor
- Michael Brown (historian) (born 1965), Scottish historian

== Arts and entertainment ==
- Michael Brown (writer), (1920–2014), American composer, lyricist, writer, director, producer, and performer
- Michael Napier Brown (1937–2016), British actor, theatre director and playwright
- Michael Brown (rock musician) (1949–2015), American keyboardist and songwriter
- Michael Ealy (Michael Brown, born 1973), American actor
- Michael Brown (film director) (born 1978), American documentary filmmaker
- Michael Christopher Brown (born 1978), American photographer
- Mike Brown (producer) (born 1980), American music producer, engineer, songwriter, and multi-instrumentalist
- Michael Stephen Brown (born 1987), American classical pianist and composer

== Crime ==
- Michael Campbell-Brown (born Michael Brown, 1966), Scottish businessman and fugitive
- Michael Brown, American Marine convicted of assault; see Michael Brown Okinawa assault incident

== Politics and law ==
=== United States ===
- Michael J. Brown (born 1941), Illinois state representative and businessman
- Michael Donald Brown (born 1953), shadow senator for the District of Columbia
- Michael D. Brown (born 1954), head of FEMA; resigned after Hurricane Katrina
- Michael A. Brown (American politician) (born 1965), at-large member of the Council of the District of Columbia
- Michael Lawrence Brown (born 1968), federal judge in Georgia
- G. Michael Brown (fl. 1990s), lawyer and former New Jersey gaming regulator
- Michael Brown (Michigan politician) (fl. 2009), Flint City, Michigan administrator and temporary mayor
- Michael Brown (mayor) (fl. 2000–2020), mayor of Grand Forks, North Dakota
- Mike Brown (Kansas politician) (born 1967/68), chair of the Kansas Republican Party
- Michael Brown (Missouri politician), Missouri state representative
- Mike Brown (Oklahoma politician) (fl. 2004–2016), Oklahoma state representative
- Michael Brown, housing activist, see Two Associates v. Brown
- Michael Brown, 18-year-old shot and killed by a Missouri police officer in 2014; see Killing of Michael Brown

=== Other countries ===
- Michael A. Brown (Canadian politician) (1950–2024), Canadian Liberal politician, speaker of the Ontario legislature
- Michael Brown (British politician) (born 1951), British Conservative MP and political journalist
- Michael Brown (Australian politician), member of the South Australian House of Assembly
- Mick Brown (judge) (1937–2015), New Zealand judge

== Religion ==
- Michael Brown (English priest) (1915–2004), Archdeacon of Nottingham
- Michael Brown (New Zealand priest) (1936–2024), New Zealand Anglican priest
- Michael L. Brown (born 1955), conservative American Messianic Jewish radio host and scholar

== Science and medicine ==
- Michael Brown (physician) (1931–1993), British physician, Director of Army Medicine and Physician to the Queen
- Michael Stuart Brown (born 1941), American Nobel Prize-winning biologist
- Michael F. Brown (born 1948), American professor of chemistry
- Michael Glyn Brown (1957–2013), American hand surgeon
- Michael E. Brown (born 1965), American astronomer and discoverer of dwarf planets Eris, Haumea, and Makemake

== Sports ==
=== American football ===
- Mike Brown (American football executive) (born 1935), owner of the Cincinnati Bengals
- Mike Brown (safety) (born 1978), player
- Michael Brown (linebacker) (born 1980), player
- Mike Brown (wide receiver) (born 1989), player and coach
- Mike Brown (defensive back, born 1999), player

=== Association football ===
- Micky Brown (Michael John Brown, 1944–2021), English footballer
- Michael Brown (footballer, born 1951), Welsh footballer
- Mickey Brown (born 1968), English footballer for Shrewsbury Town
- Michael Brown (footballer, born 1977), English footballer for Port Vale F.C.
- Michael Brown (footballer, born 1985), English footballer for Chester City

=== Baseball ===
- Mike Brown (Negro leagues outfielder) (fl. 1905–1914), American Negro league baseball player
- Mike Brown (1980s outfielder) (born 1959), American MLB outfielder for Pittsburgh Pirates and California Angels
- Mike Brown (pitcher) (born 1959), American MLB pitcher for Boston Red Sox and Seattle Mariners

=== Basketball ===
- Mike Brown (basketball, born 1963), American former professional basketball player and coach
- Mike Brown (basketball, born 1970), American basketball coach

=== Ice hockey ===
- Mike Brown (ice hockey, born 1957), American ice hockey player
- Mike Brown (ice hockey, born 1979), Canadian NHL forward
- Mike Brown (ice hockey, born 1981), Canadian ice hockey goaltender
- Mike Brown (ice hockey, born 1985), American NHL forward

=== Other sports ===
- Mike Brown (badminton) (born 1957), English badminton player
- Michael Brown (canoeist) (1937–2024), Canadian sprint canoer
- Michael Brown (chess player) (born 1997), American chess grandmaster
- Michael Brown (cricketer) (born 1980), English cricketer
- Mike Brown (fighter) (born 1975), American mixed martial arts fighter
- Mike Brown (motorcyclist) (born 1972), American national champion motocross racer
- Michael Brown (Australian rules footballer) (born 1976)
- Michael Brown (rugby league) (born 1970), Australian rugby league player
- Mike Brown (rugby union) (born 1985), English rugby union player
- Mike Brown (swimmer) (born 1984), Canadian Olympic swimmer
- Michael Brown (tennis) (born 1971), Australian tennis player
- Mike Brown (tennis) (born 1968), American tennis player
- Michael Brown (sprinter), winner of the 2002 distance medley relay at the NCAA Division I Indoor Track and Field Championships
- Mike Brown (pole vaulter) (born 1977), American pole vaulter, 1999 All-American for the Notre Dame Fighting Irish track and field team

== Other ==
- Mike Brown (transport executive) (born 1964), Commissioner of Transport for London
- Michael Brown (corporate executive) (born 1950s), American corporate executive

== See also ==
- Mick Brown (disambiguation)
- Michael Browne (disambiguation)
- Mikel Brown Jr. (born 2006), American basketball player
