= New York's 74th State Assembly district =

American legislative district

Assemblymember
Keith Powers; D–Stuyvesant Town

New York's 74th State Assembly district is one of the 150 districts in the New York State Assembly. It has been represented by Keith Powers since 2026.

== Geography ==
District 74 is in Manhattan. The district includes portions of the Lower East Side, East Village, and Midtown East. The Flatiron Building complex and the headquarters of the United Nations is within this district.

The district lies within New York's 10th and 12th congressional districts, as well as the 27th, 28th and 59th districts of the New York State Senate and the 2nd, 3rd and 4th districts of the New York City Council.

== Recent election results ==
=== 2026 general ===
2026 New York State Assembly election, District 74
Party	Candidate	Votes	%
Democratic	Keith Powers (incumbent)		
Republican	Veronica Gonzalez		
Conservative	Veronica Gonzalez		
Total	Veronica Gonzalez		
Write-in			
Total votes			100.0

=== 2026 special ===
Incumbent Harvey Epstein resigned his seat on December 4, 2025 to serve in the New York City Council, triggering a special election. In special elections for state legislative offices, primaries are usually not held – county committee members for each party select nominees.

2026 New York State Assembly special election, District 74
Party	Candidate	Votes	%
Democratic	Keith Powers	4,203	82.5
Republican	Joseph Foley	719	
Conservative	Joseph Foley	120	
Total	Joseph Foley	839	16.5
Write-in		50	1.0
Total votes		5,092	100.0
Democratic hold			

=== 2024 ===
2024 New York State Assembly election, District 74
Party	Candidate	Votes	%
Democratic	Harvey Epstein	38,149	
Working Families	Harvey Epstein	4,502	
Total	Harvey Epstein (incumbent)	42,651	99.0
Write-in		444	1.0
Total votes		43,095	100.0
Democratic hold			

=== 2022 ===
2022 New York State Assembly election, District 74
Party	Candidate	Votes	%
Democratic	Harvey Epstein	26,820	
Working Families	Harvey Epstein	3,353	
Total	Harvey Epstein (incumbent)	30,173	82.9
Republican	Bryan Cooper	6,138	16.9
Write-in		64	0.2
Total votes		36,375	100.0
Democratic hold			

=== 2020 ===
2020 New York State Assembly election, District 74
Party	Candidate	Votes	%
Democratic	Harvey Epstein	39,853	
Working Families	Harvey Epstein	6,896	
Total	Harvey Epstein (incumbent)	46,749	99.2
Write-in		364	0.8
Total votes		47,113	100.0
Democratic hold			

=== 2018 ===
2018 New York State Assembly election, District 74
Primary election
Party	Candidate	Votes	%
Democratic	Harvey Epstein (incumbent)	10,517	62.7
Democratic	Akshay Vaishampayan	3,202	19.1
Democratic	Juan Pagan	2,983	17.8
Write-in		70	0.4
Total votes		16,772	100.0
General election
Democratic	Harvey Epstein	34,316	
Working Families	Harvey Epstein	2,219	
Total	Harvey Epstein (incumbent)	36,535	87.3
Republican	Bryan Cooper	4,694	11.2
Reform	Juan Pagan	586	1.4
Write-in		43	0.1
Total votes		41,858	100.0
Democratic hold			

=== 2018 special ===
2018 New York State Assembly special election, District 74
Party	Candidate	Votes	%
Democratic	Harvey Epstein	3,541	
Working Families	Harvey Epstein	616	
Total	Harvey Epstein	4,157	89.9
Republican	Bryan Cooper	248	5.4
Green	Adrienne Craig-Williams	104	2.2
Reform	Juan Pagan	103	2.2
Write-in		13	0.3
Total votes		4,625	100.0
Democratic hold			

=== 2016 ===
2016 New York State Assembly election, District 74
Party	Candidate	Votes	%
Democratic	Brian Kavanagh	37,627	
Working Families	Brian Kavanagh	2,251	
Total	Brian Kavanagh (incumbent)	39,878	81.6
Republican	Frank Scala	7,164	
Reform	Frank Scala	199	
Total	Frank Scala	7,363	15.1
Green	Scott Hutchins	1,569	3.2
Write-in		38	0.1
Total votes		48,848	100.0
Democratic hold			

=== 2014 ===
2014 New York State Assembly election, District 74
Party	Candidate	Votes	%
Democratic	Brian Kavanagh	13,946	
Working Families	Brian Kavanagh	2,935	
Total	Brian Kavanagh (incumbent)	16,881	84.9
Republican	Bryan Cooper	2,973	15.0
Write-in		27	0.1
Total votes		19,881	100.0
Democratic hold			

=== 2012 ===
2012 New York State Assembly election, District 74
Primary election
Party	Candidate	Votes	%
Democratic	Brian Kavanagh	3,286	72.5
Democratic	Juan Pagan	1,223	27.0
Write-in		21	0.5
Total votes		4,530	100.0
General election
Democratic	Brian Kavanagh	32,584	
Working Families	Brian Kavanagh	2,291	
Total	Brian Kavanagh (incumbent)	34,875	99.8
Write-in		77	0.2
Total votes		34,952	100.0
Democratic hold			

=== 2010 ===
2010 New York State Assembly election, District 74
Party	Candidate	Votes	%
Democratic	Brian Kavanagh	20,130	
Working Families	Brian Kavanagh	2,941	
Total	Brian Kavanagh (incumbent)	23,071	84.1
Republican	Dena Winokur	4,332	15.8
Write-in		21	0.1
Total votes		27,424	100.0
Democratic hold			

=== 2008 ===
2008 New York State Assembly election, District 74
Party	Candidate	Votes	%
Democratic	Brian Kavanagh	36,697	
Working Families	Brian Kavanagh	2,066	
Total	Brian Kavanagh (incumbent)	38,763	85.3
Republican	Bryan Cooper	6,679	14.7
Write-in		3	0.0
Total votes		45,445	100.0
Democratic hold			
