= Sylvia Friedman =

American politician

Member of the New York State Assembly from the 74th district
- In office February 2006 – December 2006
- Preceded by: Steven Sanders
- Succeeded by: Brian P. Kavanagh

Personal details
- Died: February 4, 2013 (aged 74)
- Party: Democratic
- Profession: Politician

Sylvia M. Friedman was a former New York State Assemblywoman. She was elected to fill an unexpired term on February 28, 2006. Friedman was a long time community activist and a member of her local community board. Her main focus was on housing and homeless issues. She died on February 4, 2013, at the age of 74.

== Career ==
She served as co-director of the Center for Independence of the Disabled in New York, as program director of Concepts of Independence, New York's Consumer Directed Personal Assistance Program, and as liaison to the disabled community in the office of Public Advocate Mark Green. She had previously lost two races for the New York City Council.

The New York Times described her in 1993 as a former teacher who subsequently was employed as a housing policy analyst with the Department of Housing Preservation and Development.

Following the resignation of former Assemblyman Steven Sanders, Friedman was a surprise choice of the Democratic Party to run to succeed him in the special election. Friedman served for ten months of Sanders' unexpired term. She represented the East Village and Lower East Side of Manhattan.

In her first week in the Assembly, she voted for Timothy's Law, which provides parity in medical insurance for mental illness. During her tenure in the Assembly, Friedman was a member of the Alcoholism and Drug Abuse Committee, the Election Law Committee, the Housing Committee and the Social Services Committee.

Friedman was defeated in the Democratic primary in September 2006 by Brian P. Kavanagh, who assumed the seat in 2007.

Before her election to the Assembly, Friedman served as district leader and then as Democratic State Committee member. On the State Committee, she was a member of the Reform Caucus and was then elected its chair. She served on Community Board 6 in Manhattan, at various times chairing the Housing Committee, the Homeless Committee and the Parks, Recreation and Landmarks Committee. For twenty years, she chaired a shelter for twelve homeless men and women. Using a gift given to the shelter as seed money, she helped create and then served on the board of Friends House in Rosehill, a residence for fifty formerly homeless people with AIDS.

A longtime member of the 504 Democratic Club executive board, she is their first member to be elected to public office. On May 21, 2006, she was awarded the Joan Kinzer Award by the club during their annual event.

== Election results ==
- February 2006 special election, NYS Assembly, 74th AD

Sylvia M. Friedman (DEM - WOR)	...	2,728
Frank J. Scala (REP)	...	1,120

- September 2006 Democratic primary election, NYS Assembly, 74th AD

Brian P. Kavanagh	...	5,213
Sylvia M. Friedman	...	4,857
Esther Yang	...	1,022
Juan Pagan	...	807

- November 2006 general election, NYS Assembly, 74th AD

Brian P. Kavanagh (DEM)	...	21,875
Sylvia M. Friedman (WOR)	...	3,855
Frank J. Scala (REP)	...	3,576

Preceded by Steven Sanders	New York State Assembly, 74th district 2006	Succeeded by Brian P. Kavanagh
