= Senator Duane =

Senator Duane may refer to:

- James Duane (1733–1797), New York State Senate
- Thomas Duane (born 1955), New York State Senate
