= Mick Brown =

Mick Brown may refer to:

- Mick Brown (physicist) (born 1936), Canadian physicist
- Mick Brown (judge) (1937–2015), New Zealand jurist
- Mick Brown (footballer) (born 1939), Irish football scout and footballer
- Mick Brown (angler) (born 1946), British angler and television presenter
- Mick Brown (journalist) (born 1950), British freelance journalist
- Mick Brown (musician) (born 1956), American drummer who has played in the bands Dokken, Lynch Mob, and Xciter
- Mickey Brown (born 1968), English footballer
- Mick Brown, British drummer of the bands The Mission and Red Lorry Yellow Lorry
- Mick Brown, British radio DJ, performed as Pat and Mick with Pat Sharp

== See also ==
- Michael Brown (disambiguation)
- Michael Browne (disambiguation)
