= Thomas Duane =

American politician (born 1955)

Thomas K. Duane

Member of the New York Senate
- In office January 1, 1999 – December 31, 2012
- Preceded by: Catherine M. Abate
- Succeeded by: Brad Hoylman
- Constituency: 27th district (1999-2002); 29th district (2003-2012)

Member of the New York City Council from the 3rd district
- In office January 1, 1992 – December 31, 1998
- Preceded by: Carol Greitzer
- Succeeded by: Christine Quinn

Personal details
- Born: January 30, 1955 (age 71) New York City, U.S.
- Party: Democratic
- Relatives: John F. Duane (brother)
- Education: Lehigh University (BA)
- Website: www.tomduane.com

Thomas K. Duane (born January 30, 1955) is an American politician from New York, who served in the New York State Senate from 1999 to 2012, and in the New York City Council from 1992 to 1998.

Duane was the first openly gay member of the New York State Senate, and the only such member during his tenure there. He was also the body's only openly HIV-positive member. He represented the 29th Senate district, which stretched along Manhattan's West Side from 85th Street to Canal Street, and includes the following neighborhoods: Upper West Side, Hell's Kitchen, Chelsea, Greenwich Village, and part of the East Side, including the East Village, Stuyvesant Town, Peter Cooper Village and Waterside Plaza.

== Early life and education ==
Duane holds a degree in American and Urban Studies from Lehigh University. Born at the old French Hospital on West 30th Street in Manhattan, he was raised in Flushing, Queens, where he attended St. Andrew Avellino School and Holy Cross High School (Flushing). After beginning a career as a Wall Street stockbroker, he moved into public service by volunteering for his community board and working for then-city comptroller Elizabeth Holtzman. In 2004, Duane completed Harvard University's John F. Kennedy School of Government program for Senior Executives in State and Local Government as a David Bohnett LGBTQ Victory Institute Leadership Fellow.

His brother, John F. Duane, served in the New York State Assembly in 1983–84 representing the 26th Assembly District in Queens. Duane's partner of 25 years is Louis Webre.

== Career ==
Duane was first elected to the New York City Council in 1991 for the 3rd district. Duane and Antonio Pagán, first elected in the same year, were the first two openly gay city council members in New York. For part of that time, Christine Quinn worked as his chief of staff. When he resigned his council seat on being sworn into the Senate, she successfully ran to succeed him.

In 1994, Duane ran for the U.S. House of Representatives against incumbent Jerrold Nadler, losing the primary election by a margin of two to one.

Duane has also served as a member of his local Community Board, and four terms as Male Democratic District Leader in the 64th New York State Legislature.

First elected to the New York State Senate in 1998, Duane took office the following January and won re-election every two years thereafter until leaving office in 2012.

Only the second openly LGBT member of the New York Legislature, he later became one of 5, alongside Assemblymembers Daniel O'Donnell, Matthew Titone, Harry Bronson and Deborah Glick.

Duane was the lead sponsor of same-sex union legislation in the New York State Senate. Following the failed 2009 Senate vote on the bill, New York City Council Speaker Christine Quinn thanked Duane and the State Senate leadership for bringing the bill to a vote and saying "I applaud them for their dogged leadership on this issue." Same-sex marriage was legalized in New York in 2011, and the New York Daily News described Duane as a "leader" in that legislative effort.

Duane's signature legislative accomplishments in the New York State legislature included the passage of the Sexual Orientation Non-Discrimination Act (SONDA) (2002) and Timothy's Law, which requires mental health parity for patients by insurance companies (2006) which were subsequently signed into law by Governor George Pataki.

Duane was the prime Senate sponsor of the state's Gender Expression Non-Discrimination Act (GENDA), which became law in 2019 after he had left office.

Duane was also instrumental in the ultimate passage of the Hate Crimes Protection Act of 2000, which stipulates longer penalties for those convicted of alleged hate crimes and mandates that New York State keep an active database of these crimes. Duane's advocacy of this cause was personal as well as principled; in 1983, he was hospitalized after being assaulted by two men shouting anti-gay epithets, yet the perpetrators were charged only with a misdemeanor. He also took the lead on "Manny's Law", which requires hospitals to disclose to indigent patients the availability of state-sponsored funds for health care costs, and worked to enact a rental cap of 30 percent of income for people who are living with AIDS and eligible for government financial assistance.

He was also a leader in bipartisan moves to require health insurers to cover mental health treatment, to improve health care for prisoners, and to make it harder for people to avoid paying child and spousal support.

Duane has also fought overdevelopment in historic districts. In 2003, he was honored with a Village Award from the Greenwich Village Society for Historic Preservation.

At one time he was Chairman of the Senate Committee on Health, and he later served as that committee's Ranking Minority Member.

In June 2012, Duane announced that he would be leaving the Senate, citing weariness with commuting between New York City and Albany and in general being ready for "another chapter in my life."

Since retiring from the State Senate, he has continued his advocacy work on behalf of the LGBTQ community, disadvantaged children, people with HIV/AIDS, and others. He established Tom Duane Strategies, Inc., dedicated to working with organizations that improve the quality of life for New Yorkers. He has been an outspoken critic of Republican Party agendas, including the first Trump Administration, and an ongoing supporter of LGBTQ rights. He has done philanthropic work with New York City's Anti-Violence Project, which coordinates the National Coalition of Anti-Violence Programs, and has served on its board of directors.

Duane has received a number of honors, from organizations including Callen-Lorde Community Health Center, Congregation Beit Simchat Torah (where he was the World AIDS Day speaker in December 2015), and The Alpha Workshops, which will be honoring him on May 15, 2017. In 2012 he received a Legends of the Village award from VillageCare, a nonprofit serving people with chronic, continuing, and rehabilitative care needs, which cited his championing of "civil rights, including gay rights in particular, HIV treatment and outreach needs, health care initiatives that reach out to those who are underserved or not served at all, tenant rights and much more." In 2016 he received an Impact Award from Gay City News.

In January 2022, Tom Duane endorsed New York State Assembly candidate Tony Simone for the June 28, 2022 Democratic Party Primary.

== See also ==
- 2009 New York State Senate leadership crisis
- Family Health Care Decisions Act
- LGBT culture in New York City
- LGBT rights in New York
- List of LGBT people from New York City
- NYC Pride March
- Two Associates v. Brown

Political offices
Preceded by Carol Greitzer	Member of the New York City Council from the 3rd district 1992–1998	Succeeded by Christine Quinn
New York State Senate
Preceded by Catherine Abate	Member of the New York State Senate from the 27th district 1999–2002	Succeeded by Carl Kruger
Preceded by David Paterson	Member of the New York State Senate from the 29th district 2003–2012	Succeeded by José M. Serrano
Preceded by Kemp Hannon	Chairman of the Senate Committee on Health; 2009–2010	Succeeded by Kemp Hannon
