= Carol Greitzer =

American politician (1925–2026)

Member of the New York City Council from the 3rd district
- In office January 1, 1975 – December 31, 1991
- Preceded by: Miriam Friedlander
- Succeeded by: Thomas Duane

Member of the New York City Council from the 2nd district
- In office January 28, 1969 – December 31, 1974
- Preceded by: Ed Koch
- Succeeded by: Miriam Friedlander

Personal details
- Born: Carol Hutter; January 3, 1925 New York City, U.S.
- Died: April 3, 2026 (aged 101) New York City, U.S.
- Party: Democratic
- Spouse(s): Herman Greitzer (m. 1952; div. 1965) Joshua Vogel (m. 1990; died 2018)
- Children: 1 daughter

Carol Greitzer (née Hutter; January 3, 1925 – April 3, 2026) was an American politician who served in the New York City Council from 1969 to 1991 and was the first president of NARAL Pro-Choice America.

== Background ==
Carol Hutter was born in Manhattan, New York City, on January 3, 1925. She grew up in the north Bronx, and credits her love of New York City to her native New Yorker father, Harry Hutter, who enjoyed learning about the history of the city and often took her sightseeing. Greitzer attended Hunter College and then went on to receive a master's in English Literature from NYU. She was Jewish.

Greitzer later moved to New York's Greenwich Village neighborhood with her first husband, Herman Greitzer, whom she married in 1952. They divorced in 1965 and she later married lawyer Joshua S. Vogel in November 1990; they were married until his death in 2018. She died at her home in Greenwich Village on April 3, 2026, at the age of 101. She had one daughter from her first marriage, and three stepchildren.

== Political career ==
Greitzer claimed that her move to Greenwich Village played a large role in her becoming politically active. She joined the Greenwich Village Association, and after assisting with a campaign for Adlai Stevenson II, became a member of the Village Independent Democrats in 1956. In 1960, she ran for president of the Village Independent Democrats against Ed Koch and won. In 1961, Greitzer decided to run for district leader, which at the time was separated into two roles, district leader male and district leader female.

=== Preservation ===
Greitzer became increasingly involved with preservation and community organizing. One of her first major successes was saving the Jefferson Market Courthouse. Greitzer worked alongside Philip Wittenberg and Margot Gayle to organize local leaders and children from the community to campaign for the courthouse to be turned into a library. Their campaign was successful, and the building was spared from demolition and still stands today as the Jefferson Market Library.

She was also heavily involved in a plan to remove car and bus traffic from Washington Square Park. In 1963 she worked with Shirley Hayes and Ed Koch to complete the plan, arguing that it would provide better outdoor space for children in the community as well as cut down on air pollution. Their efforts worked, and she joined Koch to symbolically push the final bus out of Washington Square Park.

=== New York City Council ===
When Ed Koch left his New York City Council position in 1969 to run for Congress, Greitzer decided to run for the newly vacant Council seat. Greitzer won and was a New York City Councilwoman, representing Greenwich Village and other downtown areas. Greitzer served as a Councilwoman for 22 years, beginning with her win in 1969 and ending in 1991 when she lost her Council seat to Republican Charles Millard.

Following the nearby Stonewall riots that had occurred months earlier, Greitzer met twice with members of the Gay Activists Alliance in May 1970.

== Feminist activism ==
=== NARAL ===
Greitzer's activism continued throughout her time on the Council, and she became increasingly involved with feminist issues. Greitzer's became active in New York's pro-choice movement, and began working with NARAL, which at the time stood for National Association for the Repeal of Abortion Laws. Greitzer worked closely with politician Percy Sutton, a pro-choice advocate, to push for pro-choice legislation in New York state.

NARAL's board of directors voted Greitzer president of the organization on September 27, 1969. As president, she worked alongside other feminist activists including Shirley Chisholm, Lana Clark Phelan, Lee Gidding, and Lucinda Cisler. In 1972, Greitzer attended the Democratic National Convention as a representative for George McGovern. At the convention, Greitzer worked with other feminists to argue that women and their reproductive rights needed to be a prominent issue for the Democratic party.

=== First Women's bank ===
In addition to her activist work, Greitzer helped found the New York First Women's Bank. In 1973, Greitzer worked with Evelyn Lehman, Jane Trahey, Eileen Preiss, Sarah Kovner, Carol Opton, Betty Friedan, Sheldon Goldstein, and Philip Sills to establish the bank and provide funds. The bank inspired groups in cities all over the country to open up their own women's banks, providing financial guidance, seminars, and employment to women.

In 1989, the First Women's Bank changed its name to the First New York Bank for Business, claiming that over time, there was less of a need for gender-specific banking.

== See also ==
- J. Raymond Jones
