= Antonio Pagán =

American politician

Member of the New York City Council from the 2nd district
- In office January 1, 1992 – December 31, 1997
- Preceded by: Miriam Friedlander
- Succeeded by: Margarita López

Personal details
- Born: August 22, 1958 New York City, U.S.
- Died: January 25, 2009 (aged 50) New York City, U.S.
- Party: Democratic

Antonio Pagán (August 22, 1958 – January 25, 2009) was an American politician, who held roles in the municipal government of New York City. He represented the 2nd district of the New York City Council for six years, and was subsequently appointed the city's commissioner of the Department of Employment by mayor Rudy Giuliani in 1998.

Pagán, a native of Manhattan who spent much of his early life in Puerto Rico, became one of the two first openly gay men elected to the New York City Council in 1991, along with Thomas Duane, after Pagán narrowly upset the incumbent, Miriam Friedlander, in a close-fought Democratic primary.

== Background ==
Pagán was born in Manhattan, New York, and spent most of his childhood in Puerto Rico. He was educated at the University of Puerto Rico and John Jay College of Criminal Justice.

== Political career ==
Although he was a Democrat, Pagán was noted for his more conservative positions on certain issues, including opposition to low-income housing, and was frequently criticized by both gay and Puerto Rican activist groups for taking positions they felt were contrary to community interests. However, he also often fought to protect small local and independent businesses that were threatened by increased competition from national chain stores.

At the end of his second council, Pagán opted not to run for a third term on council — instead he sought the Democratic nomination for Manhattan borough president, coming in fourth in the primary. He broke party ranks to endorse Giuliani over Democratic challenger Ruth Messinger in that year's mayoral race. Following the election, Giuliani named Pagán as commissioner of The Department of Employment, a post he held until 2002.

== Death ==
Pagán died in 2009, aged 50. The cause of death was kidney failure; other people within his network of acquaintances claim he had a stroke. He was survived by his mother and three brothers.

== See also ==
- LGBTQ culture in New York City
- List of LGBTQ people from New York City
- Nuyorican
- NYC Pride March
- Puerto Ricans in New York City

Political offices
Preceded by Miriam Friedlander	New York City Council, 2nd district 1992–1997	Succeeded by Margarita López
