= Harvey Epstein =

American politician (born 1967)

- Epstein in 2024

Member of the New York City Council from the 2nd district
- Incumbent
- Assumed office December 4, 2025
- Preceded by: Carlina Rivera

Member of the New York State Assembly from the 74th district
- In office May 20, 2018 – December 4, 2025
- Preceded by: Brian P. Kavanagh
- Succeeded by: Keith Powers

Personal details
- Born: Harvey David Epstein; February 5, 1967 (age 59) Wantagh, New York, U.S.
- Party: Democratic
- Education: Ithaca College (BA); City University of New York (JD)

Harvey David Epstein (/ˈɛpstiːn/ EP-steen; born February 5, 1967) is an American politician and attorney. He is a member of the New York City Council from the 2nd district, which consists of parts of the Lower East Side and East Village neighborhoods of Manhattan, New York City. He was previously a member of the New York State Assembly from the 74th district between 2018 and 2025.

== Early life and career ==
Epstein earned a bachelor's degree from Ithaca College in social studies. He ran a homeless shelter in Hempstead, New York, and worked in the South Bronx for a foster care agency. He earned a Juris Doctor from CUNY Law School and worked for Queens Legal Services and The Legal Aid Society. Epstein served as community development director for the Urban Justice Center.

== Political career ==
Epstein won a special election to the New York State Assembly to succeed Brian P. Kavanagh, who was elected to the New York State Senate, in 2018.

Epstein is a member of the Vote Blue Coalition, a progressive group and federal Political Action Committee (PAC) created to support Democrats in New York, New Jersey, and Pennsylvania through voter outreach and mobilization efforts.

Epstein sponsored legislation to reform the New York State Real Property Law and Tax Law in regards to mezzanine financing. The legislation calls for the recording of mezzanine debt and preferred equity investments and subject it to the mortgage recording tax. These amendments will force borrowers and lenders to reconsider the economic costs of mezzanine financing. It was introduced on January 22, 2021.

In February 2024, Epstein, along with four other Jewish elected officials from New York (Liz Krueger, Brad Hoylman-Sigal, Brad Lander and Lincoln Restler), signed an open letter on the Gaza war. The letter condemned Hamas and other groups in the Middle East for attacking Israel and seeking to foment antisemitism and anti-Zionism around the world, while also criticizing the Israeli government under Benjamin Netanyahu for civilian deaths in Gaza, its settlement policy in the West Bank, and leniency towards violence by Israeli settlers. The letter's signatories called for the Israeli government to prioritize negotiations to release hostages held in Gaza and voiced support for a two-state solution to the Israeli–Palestinian conflict.

Epstein won the Democratic primary for New York City's 2nd City Council district in the 2025 municipal election. Epstein ran unopposed for re-election in the 2024 New York State Assembly election, but said he intends to resign his Assembly seat if elected to the City Council in 2025. He defeated Allie Ryan, Sarah Batchu, Andrea Gordillo, and Anthony Weiner. Epstein won the general election on November 4, 2025 against Republican opponent Jason Murillo. A special election for his replacement in the Assembly is scheduled to be held on February 3, 2026.

Epstein attends a 2026 rally against NYU Langone Health's decision to end gender-affirming care for minors.

In early 2026, Epstein led the formation of the New York City Council's Animal Welfare Caucus, which advocates for the humane treatment of animals, and lower costs of pet ownership in the city. He cites the caucus's goals as reducing harm, protecting ecosystems, and fostering a healthier, more sustainable city for all. The Animal Welfare Caucus has been criticized by animal advocates for not addressing reported abuse of cats and dogs at Animal Care Centers of New York City, which operates the New York City animal shelter system, as well as the number of animals that are euthanized by the shelter.

== In popular culture ==
On November 2, 2024, Harvey Epstein was played by comedian John Mulaney in a Saturday Night Live sketch about the struggle of running for office when his name evokes the notorious sex offenders Harvey Weinstein and Jeffrey Epstein. Harvey Epstein, a fan of the show, told The New York Times that he was surprised when he was depicted and found it "ridiculously funny". He reflected, "I've been Harvey Epstein my whole life", and "people know me for who I am", which is a "really lovely reputation in the neighborhood". He encouraged readers to support survivors of sexual abuse by donating to the non-profit RAINN.

== Personal life ==
Epstein lives in the East Village. He and his wife Anita have two children, Leila and Joshua, and a rescue dog, Homer. Epstein is Jewish. Despite growing up in a Conservative, kosher-observant household on Long Island, Epstein identifies as an agnostic Jew. As a student at Ithaca College, he served as Hillel president and became vegan.

== Electoral history ==
=== 2025 ===
2025 New York City Council Democratic primary, District 2
Party	Candidate	Maximum round	Maximum votes	Share in maximum round	Maximum votes First round votes Transfer votes
Democratic	Harvey Epstein	4	14,703	56.8%	
Democratic	Sarah Batchu	4	11,182	43.2%	
Democratic	Andrea Gordillo	3	6,898	24.8%	
Democratic	Anthony Weiner	2	3,079	10.2%	
Democratic	Allie Ryan	2	2,398	7.9%	
Write-In		1	133	0.4%	

2025 New York City Council election, District 2
Party	Candidate	Votes	%
Democratic	Harvey Epstein	36,003	66.3
Working Families	Harvey Epstein	6,373	11.7
Total	Harvey Epstein	42,376	78.0
Republican	Jason C. Murillo	8,267	15.2
Conservative	Jason C. Murillo	704	1.3
Total	Jason C. Murillo	8,971	16.5
The Unity	Allie Ryan	1,720	3.2
CleanSafeStreet	Gail Schargel	1,165	2.1
Write-in		103	0.2
Total votes		54,335	100.0
Democratic hold			

=== 2024 ===
2024 New York State Assembly election, District 74
Party	Candidate	Votes	%
Democratic	Harvey Epstein	38,149	88.5
Working Families	Harvey Epstein	4,502	10.4
Total	Harvey Epstein (incumbent)	42,651	99.0
Write-in		445	1.0
Total votes		43,096	100.0
Democratic hold			

=== 2022 ===
2022 New York State Assembly election, District 74
Party	Candidate	Votes	%
Democratic	Harvey Epstein	26,820	73.7
Working Families	Harvey Epstein	3,353	9.2
Total	Harvey Epstein (incumbent)	30,173	82.9
Republican	Bryan Cooper	6,138	16.9
Write-in		66	0.2
Total votes		36,377	100.0
Democratic hold			

=== 2020 ===
2020 New York State Assembly election, District 74
Party	Candidate	Votes	%
Democratic	Harvey Epstein	39,853	84.6
Working Families	Harvey Epstein	6,896	14.6
Total	Harvey Epstein (incumbent)	46,749	99.2
Write-in		364	0.8
Total votes		47,113	100.0
Democratic hold			

=== 2018 ===
2018 New York's 74th State Assembly district special election
Party	Candidate	Votes	%
Democratic	Harvey Epstein	3,541	76.6
Working Families	Harvey Epstein	616	13.3
Total	Harvey Epstein	4,157	89.9
Republican	Bryan Cooper	248	5.4
Green	Adrienne R. Craig-Williams	104	2.2
Reform	Juan Pagan	103	2.2
Write-in		13	0.3
Total votes		4,625	100.0
Democratic hold			

2018 New York State Assembly Democratic primary, District 74
Party	Candidate	Votes	%
Democratic	Harvey Epstein (incumbent)	10,517	62.7
Democratic	Akshay Arun Vaishampayan	3,202	19.1
Democratic	Juan Pagan	2,983	17.8
Write-in		70	0.4
Total votes		16,772	100.0

2018 New York State Assembly election, District 74
Party	Candidate	Votes	%
Democratic	Harvey Epstein	34,316	82.0
Working Families	Harvey Epstein	2,219	5.3
Total	Harvey Epstein (incumbent)	36,535	87.3
Republican	Bryan Cooper	4,694	11.2
Reform	Juan Pagan	586	1.4
Write-in		43	0.1
Total votes		41,858	100.0
Democratic hold			
