= Two Associates v. Brown =

New York Supreme Court case on housing

- Court: New York Supreme Court, Appellate Division
- Full case name: Two Associates, Appellant-Respondent, v. Michael Brown, Respondent-Appellant, and New York State Division of Housing and Community Renewal, Respondent
- Decided: April 9, 1987
- Citation: 127 AD 2d 173, 70 N.Y.2d 792

Case history
- Appealed from: New York Supreme Court

Case opinions
- Concurrence: P. J. Murray, Kassal, Ellerin, J.J. Wallace

Two Associates v. Brown was a New York Supreme Court housing rights case concerning whether being in a same-sex life partner relationship with a tenant was sufficient to renew an apartment lease even if the only named tenant was deceased. After his partner Robert Hayes died of AIDS, Michael Brown was threatened with eviction from their apartment in Chelsea, Manhattan because only Hayes' name was on the lease. After initially staying his eviction to March 31, 1986, the court overturned his eviction pursuant to New York State Division of Housing and Community Renewal Emergency Operational Bulletin 85-1 and granted him a vacancy lease after 150 people protested the eviction. However, the Appellate Division upheld the eviction by striking down Bulletin 85-1 as overstepping the DHCR's authority, and with a subsequent appeal to the New York Court of Appeals denied, Brown was evicted from the apartment.

== Background ==
In 1977, Michael Brown and his partner Robert Hayes moved to a rent-stabilized apartment on 262 West 22nd Street in Chelsea, Manhattan, with their lease naming only Hayes. The building was the first to be owned by Two Associates, whose manager Bruce Kafenbaum (the building's landlord) had unsuccessfully attempted to evict its residents shortly after purchasing the building in 1982. Brown's affidavit reported that conditions in the building were poor, citing examples such as lack of heating and repairs, as well as garbage in public hallways, and the New York City Department of Sanitation subsequently issued Kafenbaum a violation for the issues.

Hayes was hospitalized for AIDS and died of the disease in early 1985. (Note: Sources vary on whether the death occurred in January or February.) While New York state's Omnibus Housing Act of 1983 allowed people to live in an apartment with a non-relative tenant, they still could not renew apartment leases even if that tenant was deceased. Kafenbaum denied Brown's request for a new lease and instead issued him an eviction notice, deeming Hayes to be "at most a roommate" instead of the life partners Brown and Hayes considered each other to be. Kafenbaum also attempted to raise the apartment's monthly rent from the rent-stabilized $161 to its market value of $1,000.

== Case ==
In response to the incident, Brown sued Kafenbaum on the grounds that New York City's rent stabilization laws recognized his life partner status as equal to that of a spouse. Brown hired Russell G. Pearce, who specialized against gentrification and tenant eviction, as his lawyer, while Kafenbaum hired Clifford Entes. He also argued that both the Equal Protection Clause in the Fourteenth Amendment to the United States Constitution and Section 11 of Article I of the New York State Constitution both guaranteed that his relationship was legally equal to that of a widower.

In December 1985, state supreme court justice Helen Freedman upheld the eviction, citing the Sullivan v. Brevard Associates ruling that the rent stabilization law only granted the lease signer the legal right to renew that lease, but stayed the eviction until March 31, 1986. In response to the court case, Tom Duane, who would later become a state senator, led a rally at Brown's apartment on March 29 (two days before the planned eviction) and started an eviction defense watch team. Approximately 150 protesters were present, including Deborah J. Glick and tenants rights activist Jane Wood. Duane told The New York Times that Brown did not appear because "he is very shy and he just doesn't want to be here in any kind of public way". The New York State Division of Housing and Community Renewal (DHCR) issued Emergency Operational Bulletin 85-1 to protect tenants from future evictions that may have been validated by Sullivan v. Brevard Associates, including non-immediate relatives.

Three weeks after the rally, Freedman overturned the previous decision, citing what she called "uncontroverted evidence that his relationship to Robert Hayes was indeed as close as that of a family member" and ruling that Bulletin 85-1 counted relatives with "a loving or economic relationship or dependency" as family members and therefore required the rent stabilization law to entitle life partners to a vacancy lease. Pearce recalled that he believes that this was in response to Duane's rallying. While it effectively counted Brown as a family member of Hayes, it did not renew his lease because he was still not legally an immediate relative, but instead he was granted a vacancy lease with a 10% increase in rent.

Subsequently, Kafenbaum appealed the case. On April 9, 1987, a panel of four judges from the Supreme Court's Appellate Division reversed Freedman's ruling, striking down Bulletin 85-1 as overstepping the authority of DHCR commissioner Manuel Miranda and failing to comply with procedural requirements. The concept of protected rights for a gay man's life partner were not addressed in the decision.

In response to the decision, Pearce said that he would be considering the possibility of an appeal in the future; on October 15, 1987, the New York Court of Appeals denied the request. The DHCR announced plans for new regulations to replace Bulletin 85-1, while there were concerns from housing experts on the impact the broadly-worded ruling would have on other relatives who received apartment inheritance.

== Aftermath and legacy ==
The result of the case was that a gay man could no longer exercise a right to inherit a rent-stabilized apartment if his life partner had died from AIDS, though Pearce maintained that the final decision's lack of addressing the protected rights of a gay life partner meant that it would not have any direct impact on other existing cases. In January 1988, Brown was evicted from his apartment. Attention towards the case gradually waned, and despite calls by GLID News in March 1988 to remember Brown, a 2024 article by Maggie Schreiner could not find any subsequent trace of him, let alone determine "whether [he] found stable and affordable housing or entered long-term homelessness".

Schreiner said that the case, despite its lack of direct legal impact, brought the trend of AIDS-related tenant evictions into political attention, with one of them, Braschi v. Stahl Associates Co. (1989), extending the New York City Human Rights Law's protections for spouses to same-sex life partners.
