= Nuyorican =

Puerto Ricans located in or around New York City

Nuyoricans
Total population
- Nuyoricans: 1,112,123 Americans (2017); 23.15% of nationwide Puerto Rican population in 2010; 5.5% of New York state population in 2010

Regions with significant populations
- New York City, United States

Languages
- American English; Puerto Rican; New York Latino English; Puerto Rican Spanish; Spanglish

Religion
- Predominantly Roman Catholic and Protestant

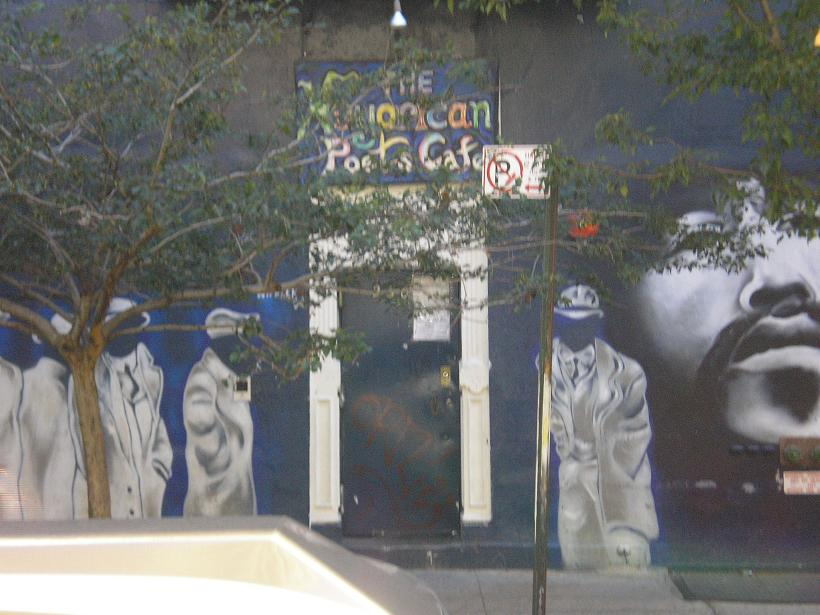
The Nuyorican Poets Café in Alphabet City, Manhattan

Nuyorican (portmanteau of "New York" ("Nueva York" in Spanish) and "Puerto Rican") refers to Puerto Ricans located in or around New York City, their culture, their Spanish, or their descendants (especially those raised or currently living in the New York metropolitan area). This term is sometimes used for Puerto Ricans living in other areas in the Northeastern United States outside New York State as well. The term is also used by Islander Puerto Ricans (Puerto Ricans from Puerto Rico) to differentiate those of Puerto Rican descent from the Puerto Rico-born.

== Etymology ==
The Oxford English Dictionary cites this word as evolving slowly through roughly the last third of the 20th century, with the first cited reference being poet Jaime Carrero using neorriqueño in 1964 as a Spanish-language adjective combining neoyorquino and puertorriqueño. Many other variants developed along the way, including neoricano, neorican (also written as Neo-Rican and Neorican), and newyorican (also written as New Yorrican). Nuyorican itself dates at least from 1975, the date of the first public sessions of the Nuyorican Poets Café. Some of the best known Nuyoricans who have written and performed their experiences of being a Puerto Rican in New York are Miguel Piñero, Miguel Algarín, Piri Thomas, Sandra María Esteves, Willie Colón, Pedro Pietri, and Giannina Braschi. Some of the newer poets include Willie Perdomo, Flaco Navaja, Nancy Mercado, Emanuel Xavier, Edwin Torres, J.L. Torres, Caridad de la Luz aka La Bruja, Lemon Andersen, and Bonafide Rojas.

Historically, the term has been used as a derogatory term by native Puerto Ricans when describing a person that has Puerto Rican ancestry but is born outside of Puerto Rico. It also can sometimes include those born in Puerto Rico who now live elsewhere in the United States (other than New York). This changed from the original meaning with the increase in travel back and forth to different parts of the United States and the globe. The definition includes those born in New York who have moved to Puerto Rico as well.

The term is used by some members of this community to identify their history and cultural affiliation to a common ancestry while being separated from the island, both physically and through language and cultural shifts. This distance created a dual identity that, while still somewhat identifying with the island, recognizes the influences both geography and cultural assimilation have had. Puerto Ricans in other cities have coined similar terms, including "Philly Rican" for Puerto Ricans in Philadelphia and "Chi-Town Rican" for Puerto Ricans in Chicago.

== History ==
Many Nuyoricans are second- and third-generation Puerto Rican living in the Continental United States whose parents or grandparents arrived in the New York metropolitan area during the Gran Migración (Great Migration). Puerto Ricans began to arrive in New York City in the nineteenth century. The Puerto Rican flag was created in 1895 New York by Juan de Mata Terreforte along with 59 other exiled independentistas. Migration intensified following the passage of the Jones-Shafroth Act on March 2, 1917, which granted U.S. citizenship to virtually all Puerto Ricans. The Gran Migración accelerated migration from Puerto Rico to New York during the 1940s and 1950s, but such large-scale emigration began to slow by the late 1960s. Due to this large scale immigration there is a huge Puerto Rican influence that can be felt throughout New York. For instance along with African Americans, Puerto Ricans have had a major influence on popular genres of music such as Hip-Hop, which is a genre of music originating out of the inner city neighborhoods of New York. Another significant contribution is the famous Puerto Rican Day Parade which has its origins in 1958 Spanish Harlem.

In 2000, the Puerto Rican population of New York was over 1,050,000. As of the 2010 census, Puerto Ricans represented 8.9% of New York City alone (32% of the city's Hispanic community), and 5.5% of New York State as a whole. Of over a million Puerto Ricans in the state, about 70% are present in New York City, with the remaining portion spreading increasingly within the city's suburbs and other major cities throughout New York State. Although Florida has received some dispersal of the population, there has been a resurgence in Puerto Rican migration to New York and New Jersey, primarily for economic and cultural considerations, topped by another surge of arrivals after Hurricane Maria devastated Puerto Rico in September 2017 – consequently, the New York City Metropolitan Area has witnessed a significant increase in its Nuyorican population, individuals in the region of Puerto Rican descent, increasing from 1,177,430 in 2010 to a Census-estimated 1,494,670 in 2016.

Historically, Nuyoricans resided in the predominantly Hispanic/Latino section of Upper Manhattan known as Spanish Harlem, and around the Loisaida section of the East Village, but later spread across the city into newly created Puerto Rican/Nuyorican enclaves in Brooklyn, Queens, and the South Bronx. Today, there are fewer island-born Puerto Ricans than mainland-born Puerto Ricans in New York City. Even though Puerto Ricans are one of the most prevalent ethnic groups in New York City, mainland Americans were not always so welcoming to their Nuyorican neighbors. In addition to the casual racism faced by Puerto Rican migrants moving into the Tri-state area, the U.S government ran a series of eugenicist campaigns throughout the first half of the 20th century known today as La Operación in an attempt to decrease the Puerto Rican population on both the Island and within the states. Under these campaigns, countless Puerto Rican women were sterilized after being pressured by health care providers or even without their consent. Due to the effectiveness of this campaign, it is estimated that by 1956, 1 in 3 Puerto Rican women were sterilized.

== Notable Nuyoricans ==
Nuyoricans

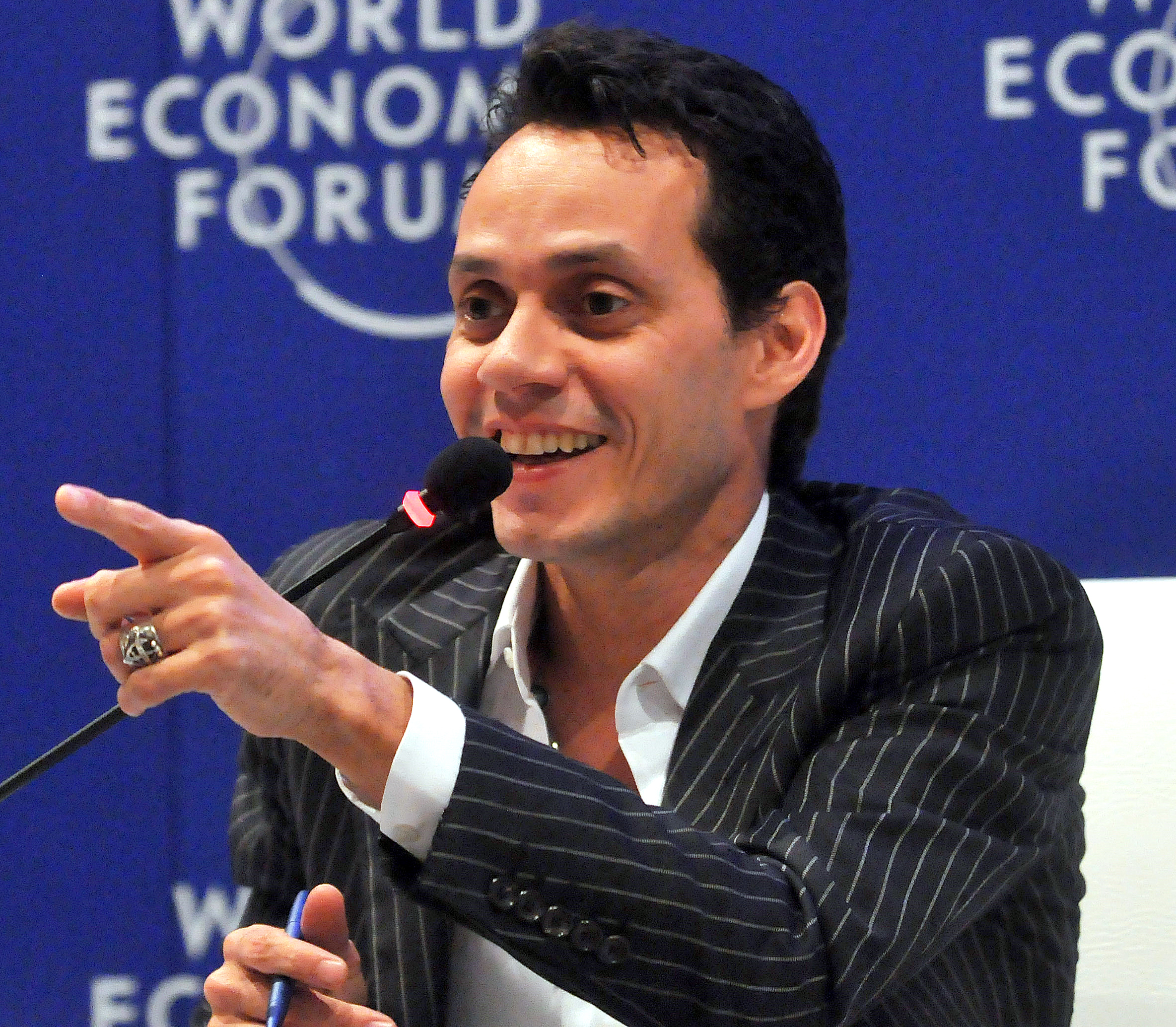
Marc Anthony

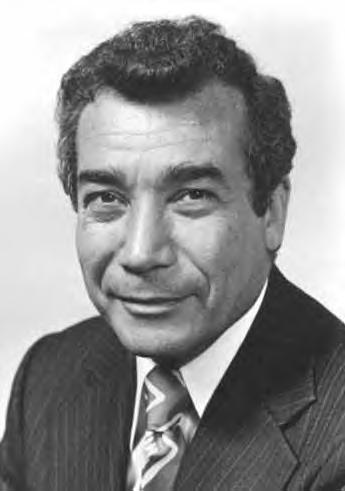
Herman Badillo

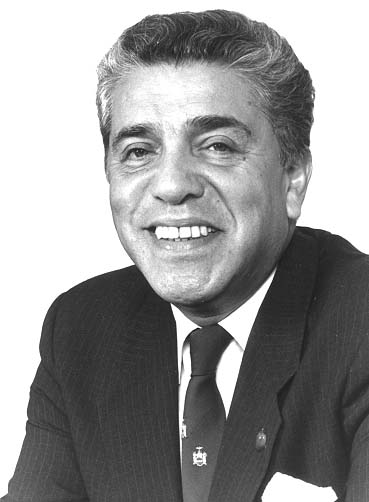
Robert Garcia

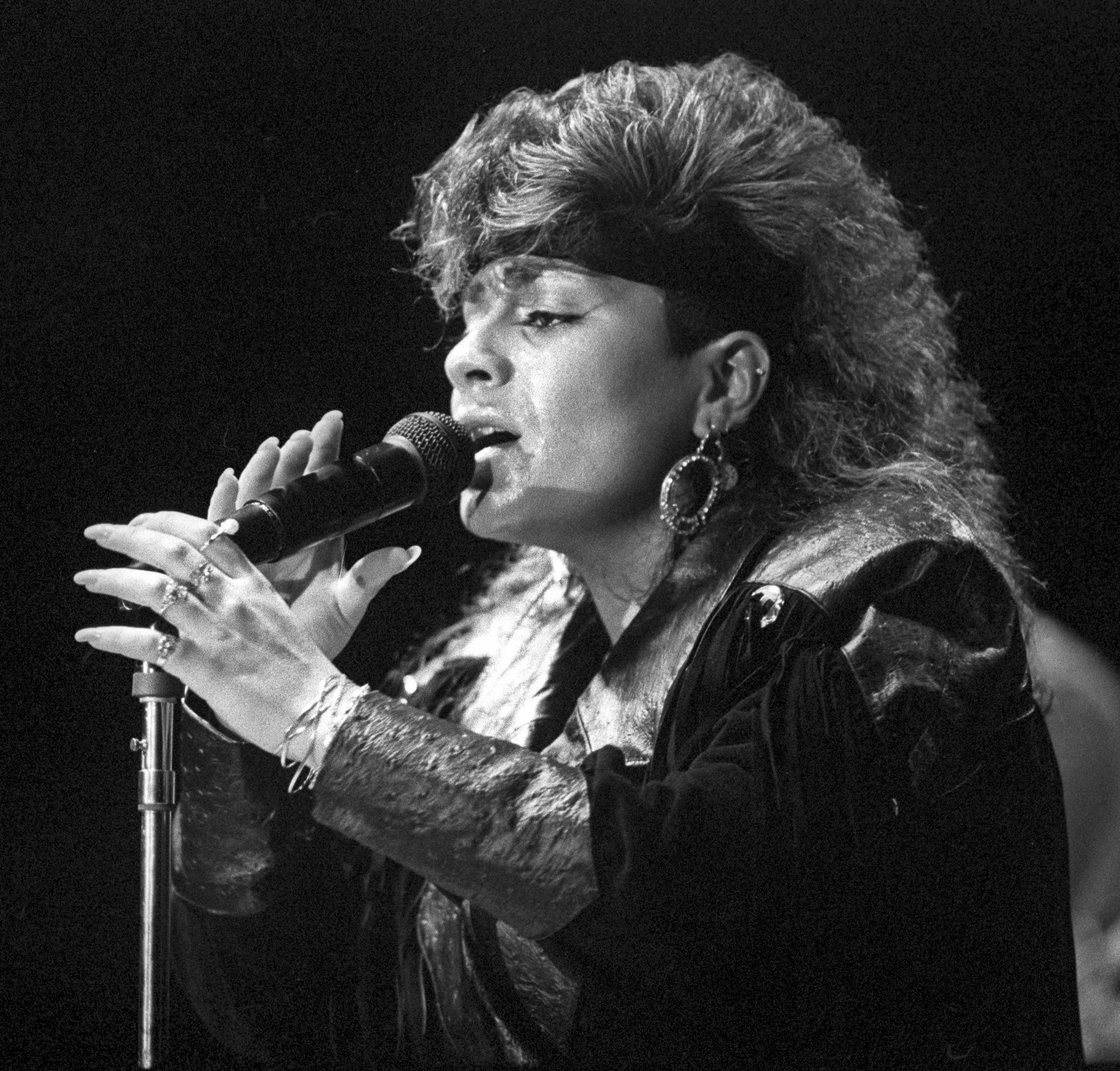
Lisa Lisa

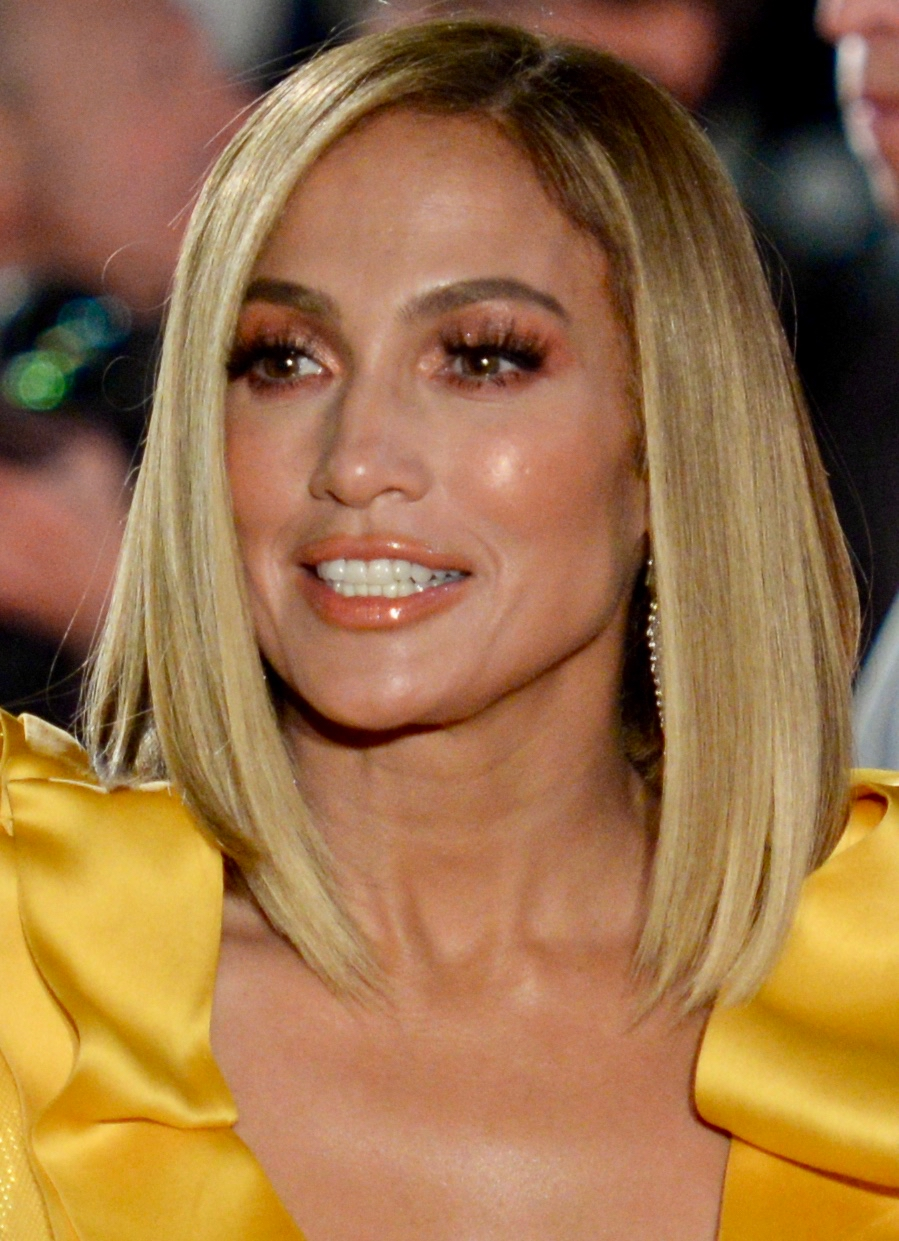
Jennifer Lopez

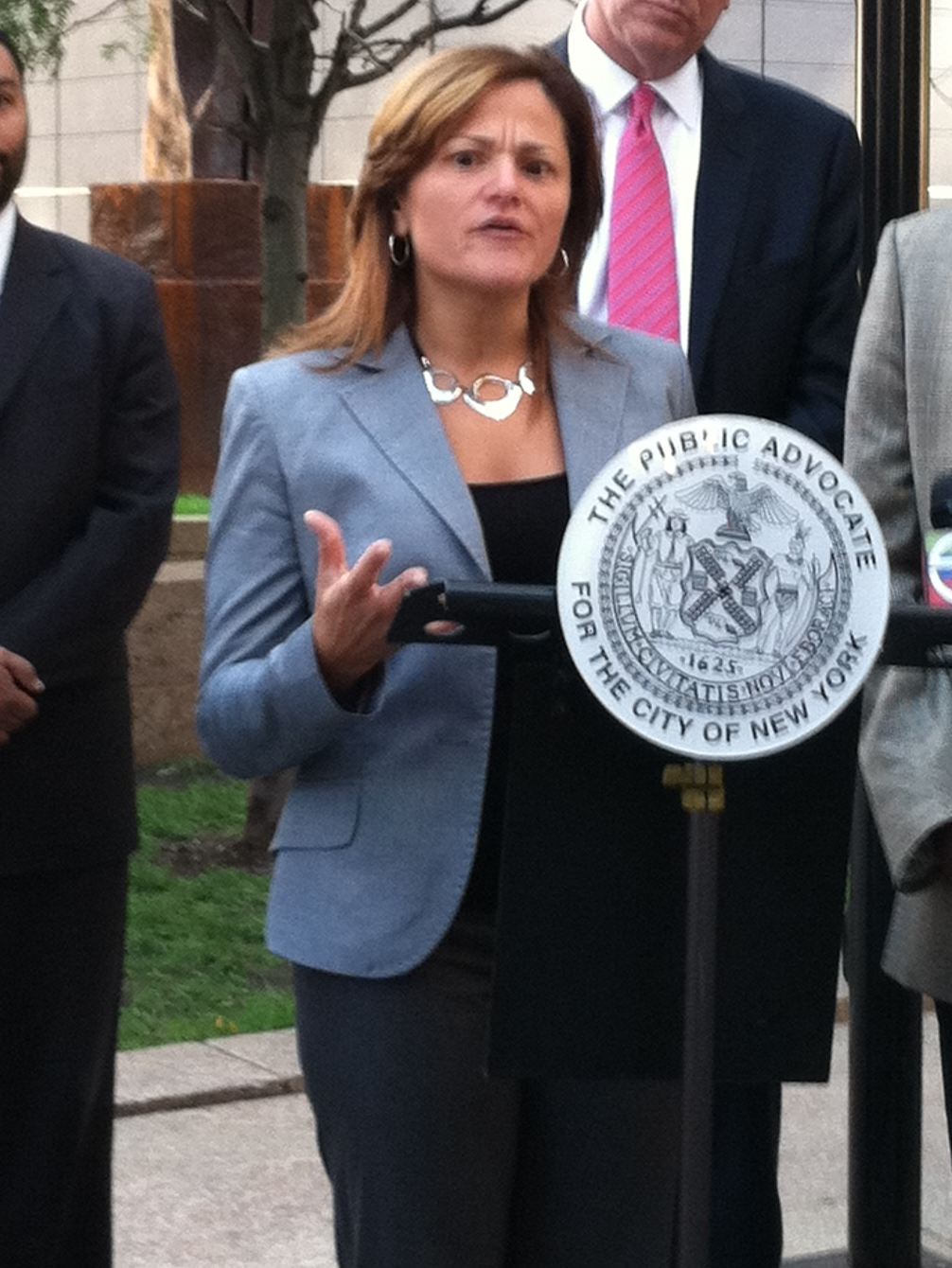
Melissa Mark-Viverito

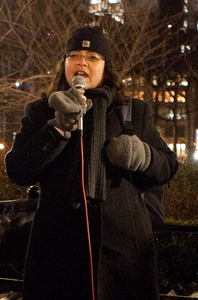
Rosie Méndez

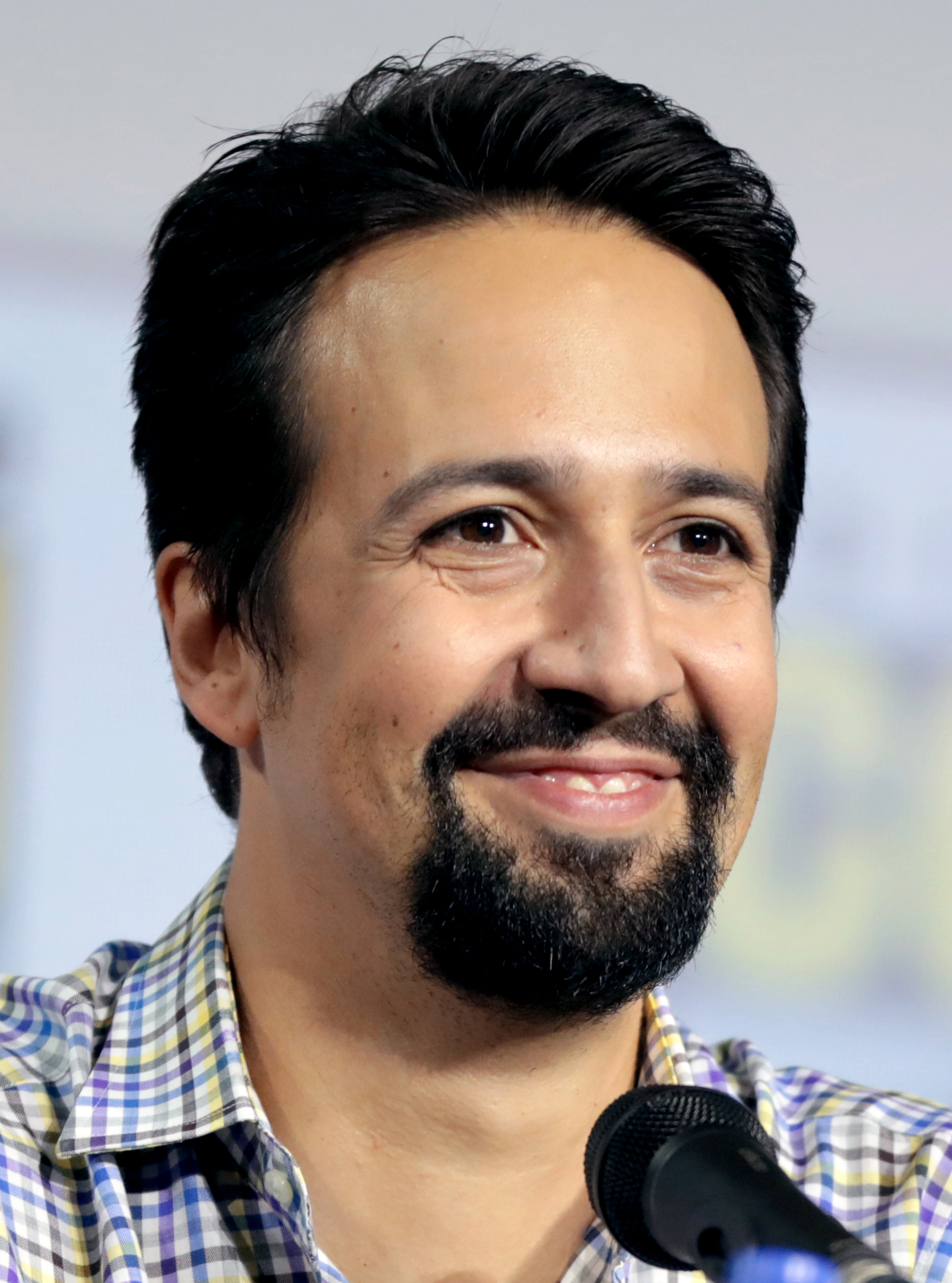
Lin-Manuel Miranda

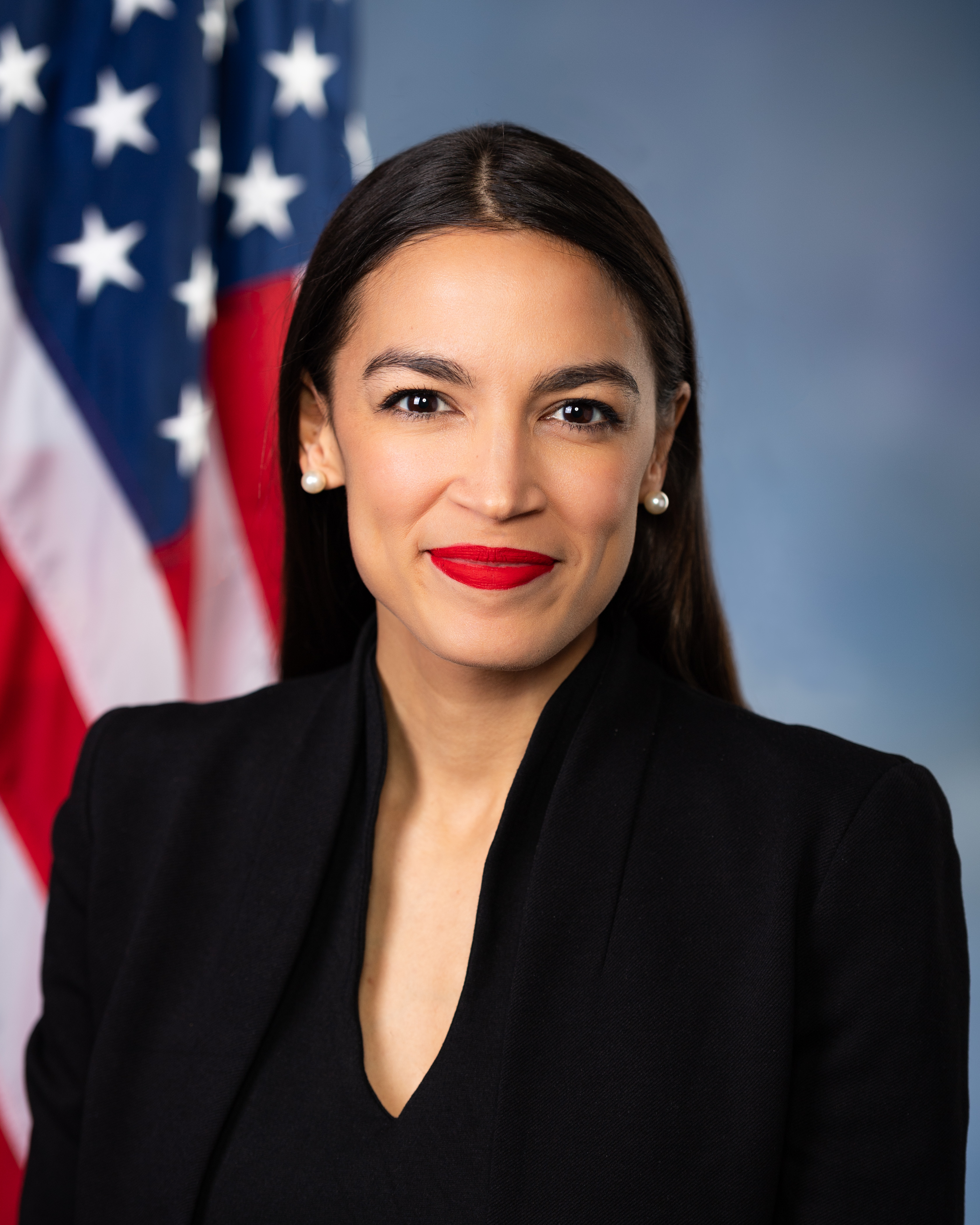
Alexandria Ocasio-Cortez

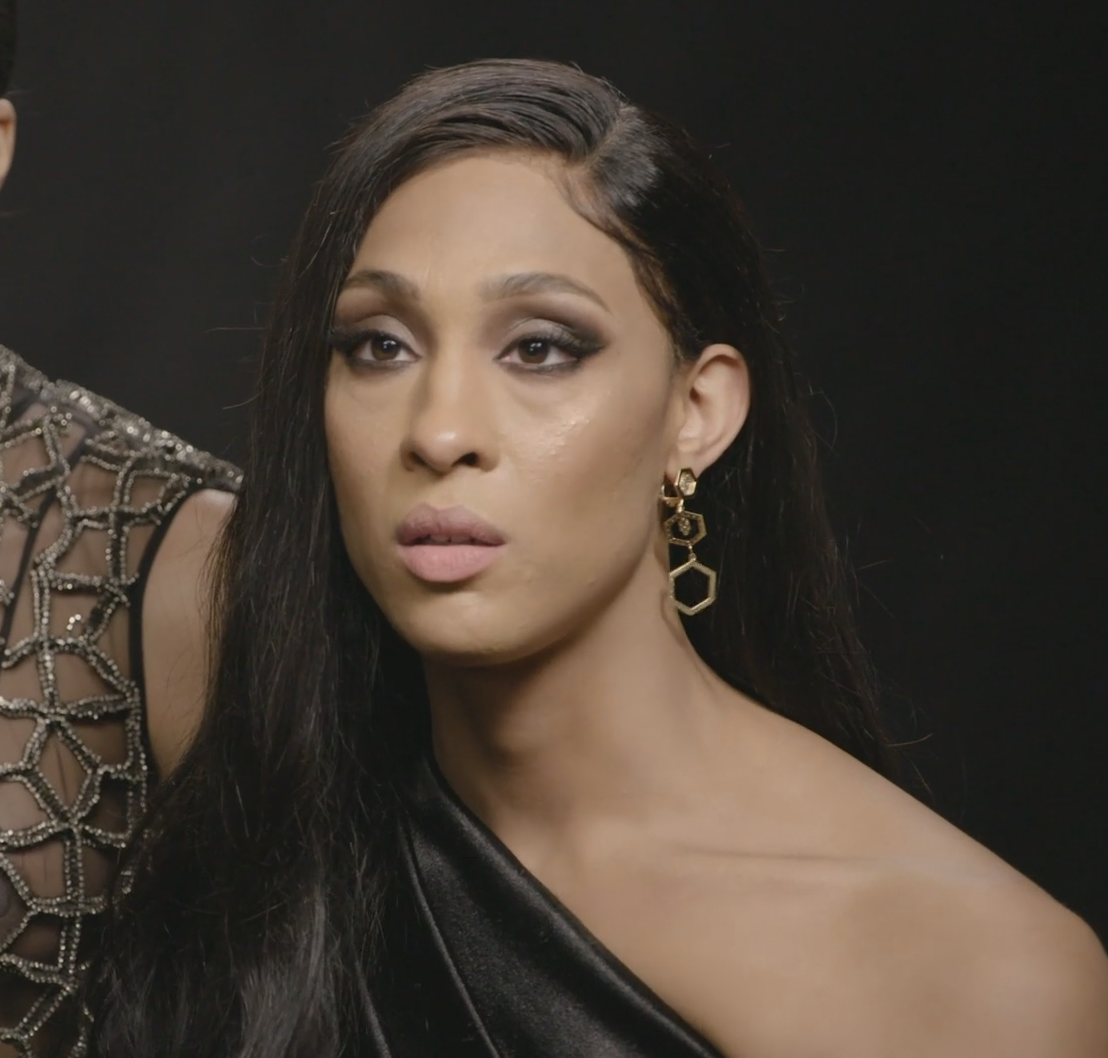
Mj Rodriguez

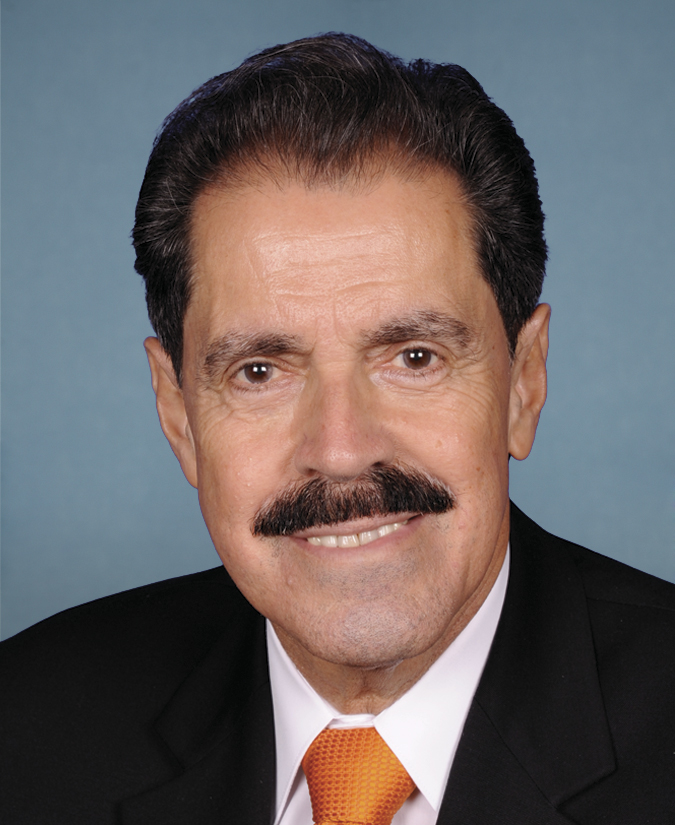
José E. Serrano

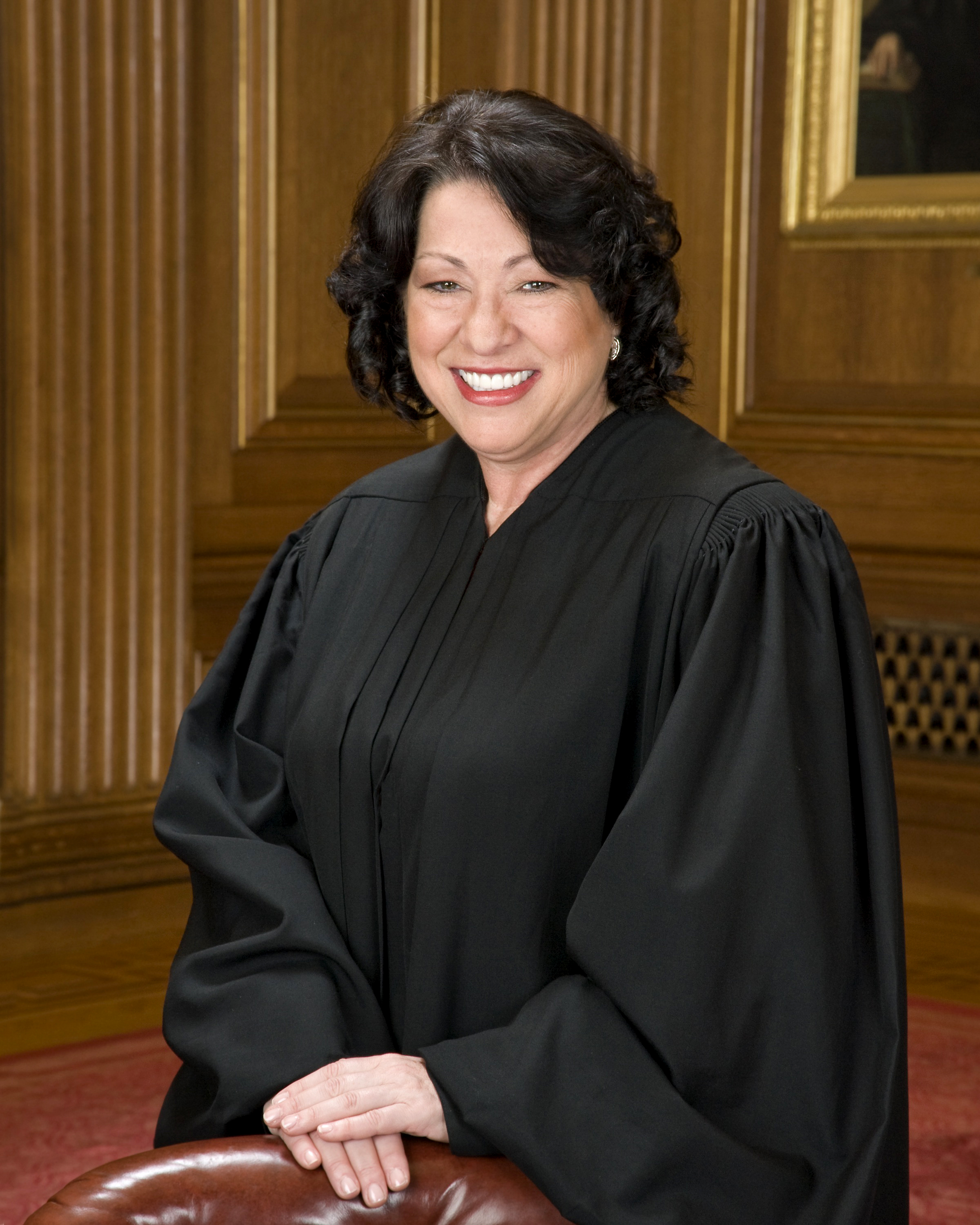
Sonia Sotomayor

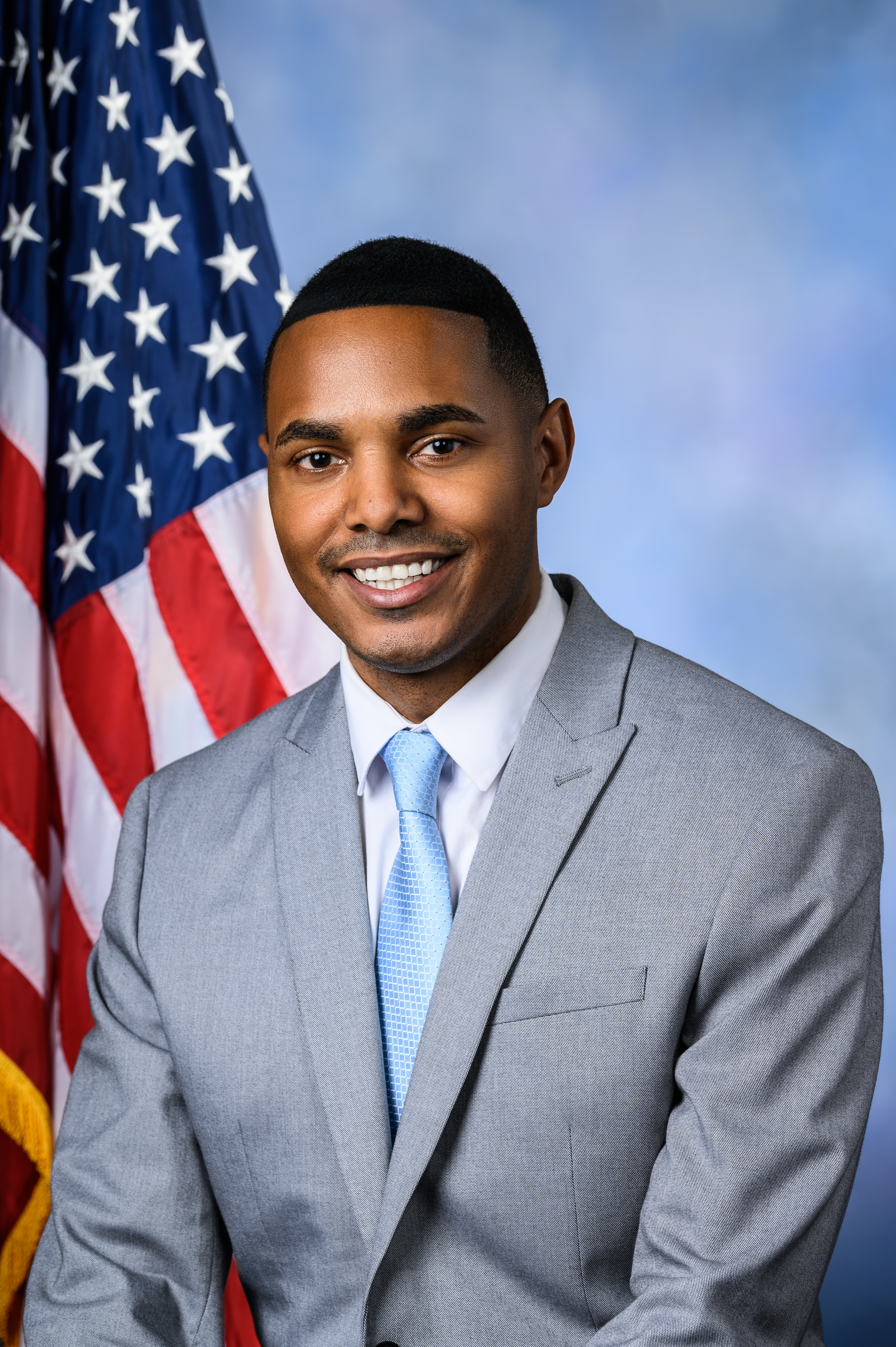
Ritchie Torres

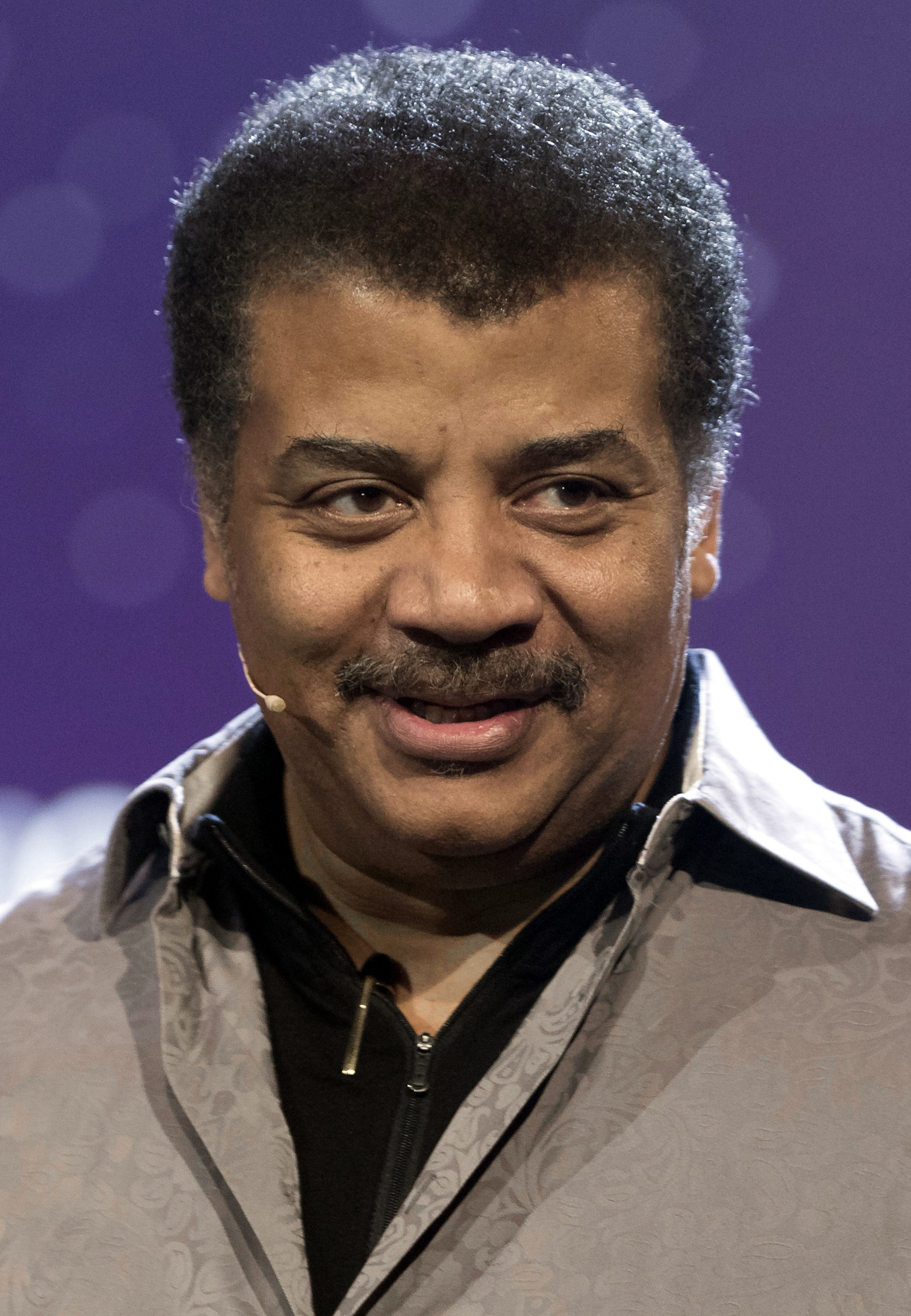
Neil deGrasse Tyson

Nuyoricans have made breakthrough contributions in government, science, law, culture, and the humanities, including those who have broken records, significantly impacted U.S. pop culture, won landmark cases that changed laws, or have been recognized by national awards.

- Big Pun – Rapper
- Adrienne Bailon – Emmy Award-winning presenter, actress, and singer
- Eugenio Alvarez – Late U.S. representative from New York State.
- Al Diaz – Graffiti artist and component of SAMO alongside his friend, Jean Michel Basquiat.
- Carmelo Anthony – Basketball player
- Marc Anthony – Record holder in the Guinness World Record for best-selling salsa artist and the most number-one albums on the Billboard Tropical Albums charts.
- Amanda Ayala – Singer/Songwriter
- Arturo Alfonso Schomburg – Historian and Writer during Harlem renaissance.
- Herman Badillo – Late U.S. representative from New York State
- Jean-Michel Basquiat – Artist, whose painting Untitled (1982) sold for $110.5 million in 2017, a new record high for an American artist at auction.
- Giannina Braschi – Writer, a National Endowment for the Arts Literature Fellow, published the first Spanglish novel Yo-Yo Boing!
- Miguel Braschi – Attorney, won the landmark legal case Braschi v. Stahl Associates Co. in the New York State Court of Appeals, which marked the first time state law recognized a gay couple as a family.
- Irene Cara – Actress and singer
- John Carro – was the first Nuyorican to be named a judge on the NY State Supreme Court, Appellate Division.
- Julia de Burgos – Puerto Rican poet, journalist, and educator.
- Luis Ferré-Sadurní is a journalist with The New York Times.
- Willie Colon – trombonist, vocalist, composer, arranger, bandleader, producer
- Robert Garcia – late U.S. representative from New York State
- Daniel Hernandez – Rapper
- Coleman Hughes – Author, musician, and host of the Podcast, Conversations with Coleman
- Kayel – Latin freestyle singer and frontman for TKA
- La India – Freestyle and Sals singer
- Little Louie Vega & Kenny Dope from Masters at Work
- J.I the Prince of New York – rapper
- George Lamond – Freestyle singer
- Lisa Lisa (Lisa Velez) – Freestyle singer
- Jennifer Lopez – performing artist, entrepreneur, and founder of Nuyorican Productions, made Forbes list of most powerful entertainers, with annual earnings in excess of US$52 million.
- Ricky Vega – Former World Champion Professional Wrestler
- Rita Moreno – first Hispanic woman to receive an Oscar, and was an actress, singer and dancer.
- Lynda Lopez – journalist and author
- Sonia Manzano – multiple Emmy winner, actress, screenwriter, author, singer, and songwriter.
- Margarita López – first openly lesbian councilwoman and female Puerto Rican elected to the New York City Council, serving from 1998 through 2006
- Melanie Martinez – Puerto Rican American singer-songwriter born in Astoria, Queens, NY
- Melissa Mark-Viverito – Speaker of the New York City Council from 2014 through 2017
- Angie Martinez – Rapper and radio host
- Lisette Melendez – Freestyle singer
- Rosie Méndez – former member of the New York City Council (2006-2018)
- Lin-Manuel Miranda – creator of the Broadway musical Hamilton, won the Pulitzer Prize in Drama.
- Nicholasa Mohr – Author
- Richie Narvaez – Author
- Alexandria Ocasio-Cortez – politician who serves as the U.S. representative from New York's 14th congressional district.
- Antonio Pagán – late and first openly gay male and Puerto Rican elected to the New York City Council, serving from 1994 through 1998; former New York City Commissioner of Small Businesses (1998–2002)
- Noel Pagán – Freestyle singer
- Eddie Palmieri – multi-Grammy winning pianist, bandleader, NEA Jazz Master
- Rosie Perez – Actress and choreographer
- Damian Priest – professional wrestler
- Tito Puente – multi-Grammy winning timbalero, composer, arranger, bandleader
- Princess Nokia – rapper
- Charles Rangel – former U.S. representative from New York
- Sylvia Rivera – Late LGBT rights activist
- Mj Rodriguez – Actress
- David Rosado – former U.S. representative from New York
- Sa-Fire (Wilma Cosmé) – Latin freestyle singer
- Bobby Sanabria – multi-Grammy nominated drummer, percussionist, bandleader, educator
- José E. Serrano – former U.S. representative, serving multiple districts in New York State
- Sonia Sotomayor – the first Nuyorican lawyer to become a United States Supreme Court Justice.
- Cynthia Torres – Freestyle singer
- Edwin Torres – New York State Supreme Court judge and author of Carlito's Way
- TKA – Freestyle band
- Judy Torres – Latin freestyle singer and radio host
- Ritchie Torres – U.S. representative for New York's 15th congressional district
- Neil deGrasse Tyson – astrophysicist and television host of the PBS series Cosmos: A Spacetime Odyssey and Cosmos: Possible Worlds. He is the first person of Puerto Rican descent to be Director of the Hayden Planetarium in New York City.

== Related identity terms ==
Nuyorican is one of several cultural identifiers for bicultural populations in the United States. Similar terms include American-born Chinese (ABC) for Chinese Americans, Nisei for Japanese Americans, American-Born Confused Desi (ABCD) for South Asian Americans, Generation Ñ for bilingual Latinos, and Chicano for Mexican Americans.

== See also ==
- African Americans
- Bushwick, Brooklyn
- Cultural assimilation
- New York Latino English
- New York City ethnic enclaves
- Nuyorican Movement
- Nuyorican Poets Café
- Puerto Ricans in New York City
- Puerto Ricans in the United States
- Racial inequality in the United States
- Sunset Park, Brooklyn
- Teatro Puerto Rico
