= Brian P. Kavanagh =

American politician (born 1967)

Brian Kavanagh
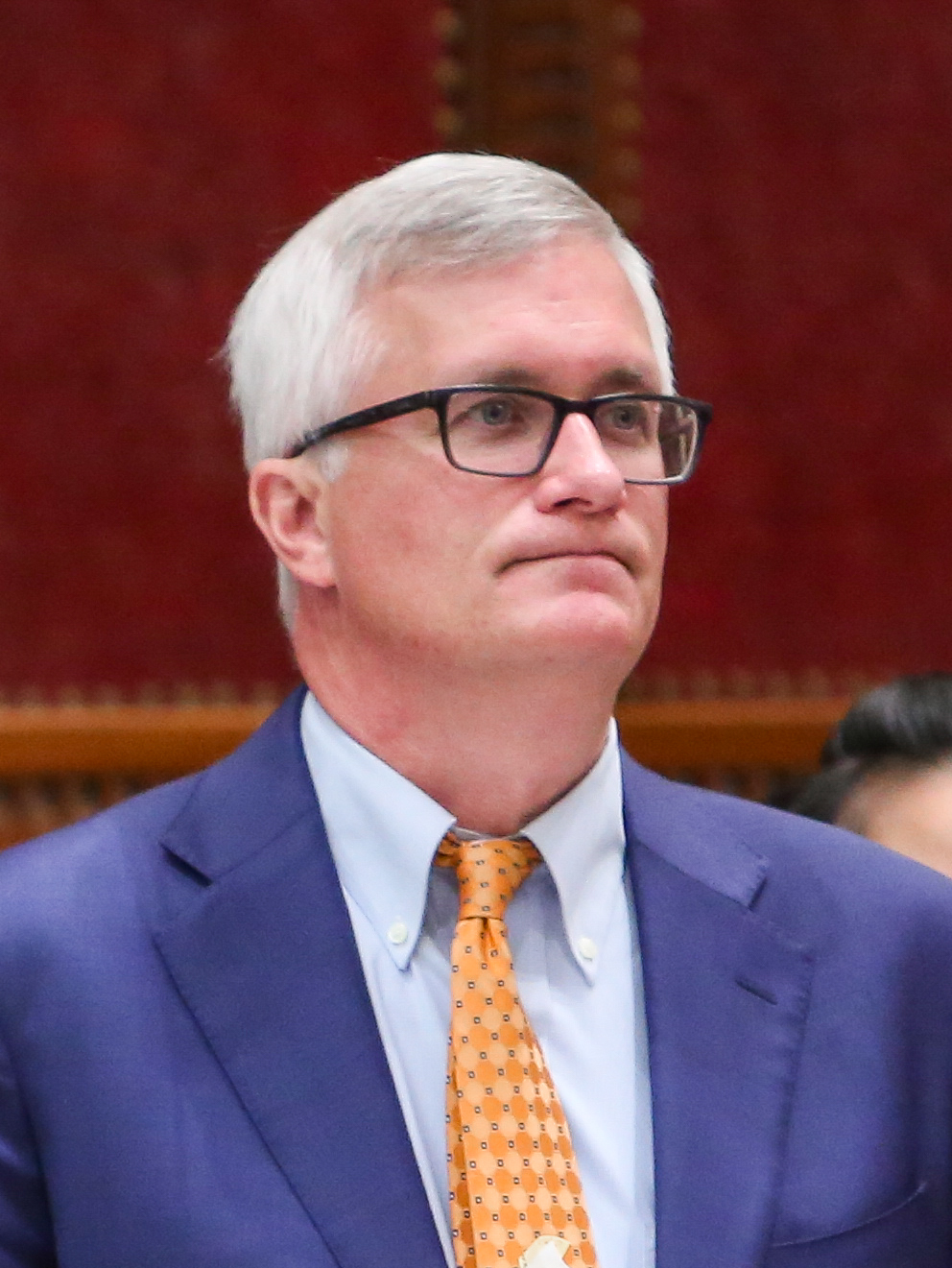
- Kavanagh in 2022

Member of the New York Senate from the 27th district
- Incumbent
- Assumed office December 7, 2017
- Preceded by: Daniel Squadron
- Constituency: 26th district (2017–2022); 27th district (2023–present)

Member of the New York State Assembly from the 74th district
- In office January 3, 2007 – December 6, 2017
- Preceded by: Sylvia M. Friedman
- Succeeded by: Harvey Epstein

Personal details
- Born: Brian Patrick Kavanagh; January 18, 1967 (age 59) Staten Island, New York, U.S.
- Party: Democratic
- Education: Princeton University (BA); New York University (JD)
- Website: State Senate website

Brian Patrick Kavanagh (born January 18, 1967) is an American politician who represents the 27th district in the New York State Senate, representing Lower Manhattan since December 2017. A member of the Democratic Party, before redistricting in January 2023, Kavanagh represented part of Brooklyn. He was previously a member of the New York State Assembly for the 74th district and represented the East Side of Manhattan.

== Early life and education ==
Kavanagh was born on January 18, 1967, on Staten Island to Eileen and John Kavanagh. He is one of six children. His father John immigrated to the United States from Buncrana, Ireland, and worked as a police officer. His mother was a community leader in Staten Island who worked for the Staten Island Advance. Kavanagh graduated from Regis High School in Manhattan. He tutored students at the Nativity Mission Center. He graduated with a Bachelor of Arts in politics from Princeton University in 1989. He then received a Juris Doctor from New York University School of Law.

== Early career ==
Kavanagh was an aide to former New York City mayors Ed Koch and David Dinkins. He was the chief of staff of New York City Council member Gale Brewer.

At the mayor's office, Kavanagh played a key role in launching the New York City Department of Homeless Services and then was the agency's first policy director.

With then-councilmember Bill Perkins, councilmember Brewer, and dozens of others, Kavanagh helped to draft and secure passage of Council Resolution 549, opposing the imminent invasion of Iraq.

Kavanagh has been a counselor, volunteer, and board member at the Lower East Side's Nativity Middle School and community center. He is a board member of the Jesuit Volunteer Corps and has worked as an attorney for Demos. He is a member of the New York City Bar Association and has served on the association's election law committee.

Kavanagh has lectured at Columbia University.

== New York State Assembly ==
Following an unsuccessful bid for New York City Council in 2005, Kavanagh was first elected to the New York State Assembly in November 2006. He is a member of the Democratic Party and has been endorsed by the Working Families Party.

== New York State Senate ==
In 2017, Kavanagh announced that he would run in the special election to succeed New York state senator Daniel Squadron, who was set to resign. Not without criticism, Kavanagh was nominated as the Democratic candidate, despite representing very little of the same territory in the New York State Assembly that the senate district encompassed. Despite this, Kavanagh easily won election. He was re-elected to a full first term in 2018.

Kavanagh has been a proponent of election reform. Stating New Yorkers "have some of the worst election laws in the country," Kavanagh introduced a bill "that would allow voters to cast ballots before Election Day". Until New York enacted early voting in 2019, it was the largest state with no advance voting regime.

With Democrats taking the majority in the New York State Senate in 2019, Kavanagh was named as the chair of the committee on housing, construction and community development.

Kavanagh was a co-sponsor of the Climate Leadership and Community Protection Act (CLCPA), enacted in 2019, and has served on the Environmental Conservation Committee in each of his years in the legislature. One of Kavanagh's priorities has been the introduction of extended producer responsibility legislation, which would require producers to be responsible for products from the beginning to end of life. He has introduced legislation in this area for rechargeable batteries, lamps, mattresses, and textiles, among others.

Kavanagh authored the "All-Electric Building Act," which became law in 2023, requiring the state energy construction code to halt the use of fossil fuels in new construction in the state.

Kavanagh has pursued legislation that would curb gun violence in New York. As the founder and chair of the American State Legislators for Gun Violence Prevention, Kavanagh prioritized working across the aisle to curb access to illegal guns. He is the sponsor of New York's red flag law, which would prevent those who may be a threat to themselves or others from purchasing or possessing a firearm.

In February 2026, Kavanaugh stated that he will not seek reelection.

== Personal life ==
Since moving to Manhattan, Kavanagh has lived in different neighborhoods, including the Lower East Side, Murray Hill, NoMad, and Turtle Bay.

== Election results ==
- September 2006 Democratic primary election, NYS Assembly, 74th AD

Brian P. Kavanagh	...	5,213
Sylvia M. Friedman	...	4,857
Esther Yang	...	1,022
Juan Pagan	...	807

- November 2006 general election, NYS Assembly, 74th AD

Brian P. Kavanagh (DEM)	...	21,875
Sylvia M. Friedman (WOR)	...	3,855
Frank J. Scala (REP)	...	3,576

- November 2008 general election, NYS Assembly, 74th AD

Brian P. Kavanagh (DEM - WOR)	...	38,777
Bryan A. Cooper (REP)	...	6,684

- November 2010 general election, NYS Assembly, 74th AD

Brian P. Kavanagh (DEM - WOR)	...	23,071
Dena Winokur (REP)	...	4,332

- September 2012 Democratic primary election, NYS Assembly, 74th AD

Brian P. Kavanagh	...	3,286
Juan Pagan	...	1,223

- November 2012 general election, NYS Assembly, 74th AD

Brian P. Kavanagh (DEM - WOR)	...	34,736

- November 2014 general election, NYS Assembly, 74th AD

Brian P. Kavanagh (DEM - WOR)	...	15,588
Bryan A. Cooper (REP)	...	2,738

- November 2016 general election, NYS Assembly, 74th AD

Brian P. Kavanagh (DEM - WOR)	...	81.68% (35,648 votes)
Frank Scala (REP)	...	15.04% (6,562 votes)
Scott Andrew Hutchins (GRE)	...	3.28% (1,432 votes)

- November 2017 special election, NYS Senate, 26th SD

Brian P. Kavanagh (DEM - WOR)	...	34,674 (85.04%)
Analicia Alexander (REP)	...	5,915 (14.51%)

- November 2022 primary election, New York State Senate

Brian P. Kavanagh(DEM)	...	(58.1%)
Vittoria Faiello	...	(29.0%)
Danyela Souza Egorov	...	(12.3%)
