= Biologically based mental illness =

Type of mental illness

Biologically based mental illness is one of three major definitions used in state parity laws.

== New Jersey ==
Under Timothy's Law the following disorders are classified as biologically based mental illness:

- Schizophrenia/psychotic disorder
- Major depression
- Bipolar disorder
- Delusional disorders
- Panic Disorder
- Obsessive Compulsive Disorder
- Bulimia
- Anorexia
