= Margarita López =

Puerto Rican politician

Member of the New York City Council from the 2nd district
- In office 1997–2006
- Preceded by: Antonio Pagán
- Succeeded by: Rosie Mendez
- Constituency: Manhattan: Lower East Side, East Village, Gramercy Park, Rosehill, Kips Bay; southern part of Murray Hill

Personal details
- Born: San Juan, Puerto Rico
- Party: Democratic

Margarita López is a former member of the New York City Council who represented New York City's 2nd City Council district from 1998 to 2005, having been elected in 1997. The 2nd district comprises the Lower East Side, Alphabet City, and the East Village.

== Early life ==
Born in Puerto Rico, she relocated to New York City in 1978.

Lopez worked as a homeless outreach social worker for 12 years for Project Outreach at Goddard Riverside.

== Political career ==
Lopez was a member of Manhattan Community Board 3 from 1985 to 1996. She was also elected female district leader of New York State Assembly district 63 in 1995. She was elected to the New York City Council on election day in 1997. She served on the council from January 1998 to January 2006.

Lopez is a Democrat. She was the second openly gay Puerto Rican politician on the City Council (in addition to her predecessor Antonio Pagan) for some time. She was the first Puerto Rican female openly lesbian or gay Democrat elected to the council. During her years of political service, she has particularly emphasized increasing city services, renovating neighborhood libraries, and championing gay, lesbian, bisexual and transgender rights.

In 2005, López entered the race to succeed C. Virginia Fields as Manhattan Borough President. Due to a series of articles published in the New York Post, she came under fire for connections to the controversial Church of Scientology, whose members donated sizeable amounts of money to her campaign. Due at least in part to the bad press generated by these stories and the Church of Scientology's views on homosexuality, she lost the Democratic primary election to win her party's endorsement for the general election in November of that year. Democratic candidate Scott Stringer won both the primary and later the general election.

In 2006, Mayor Michael Bloomberg appointed López to a seat on the board of the New York City Housing Authority. López, who once was a critic of Bloomberg, endorsed the mayor in his re-election campaign against Fernando Ferrer, the second Puerto Rican politician to run for mayor of the city (Herman Badillo was the first). She was succeeded in her previous councilmember position by Rosie Méndez.

== See also ==
- LGBTQ culture in New York City
- List of LGBTQ people from New York City
- NYC Pride March
- Nuyorican
- Puerto Ricans in New York City

Political offices
Preceded by Antonio Pagán	New York City Council, 2nd district 1998–2005	Succeeded by Rosie Mendez
