= Rosie Méndez =

American politician (born 1963)

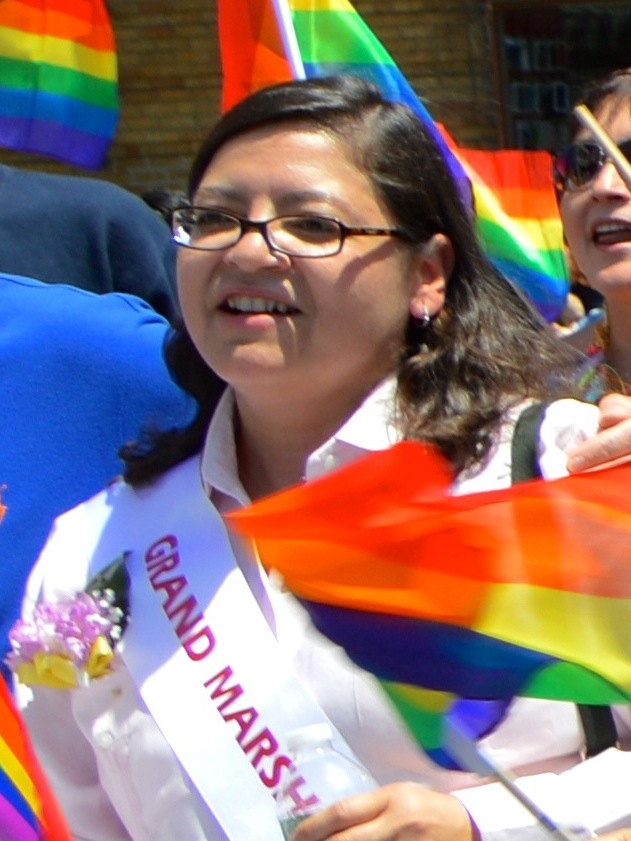
- Méndez in 2014

Member of the New York City Council from the 2nd district
- In office January 1, 2006 – December 31, 2017
- Preceded by: Margarita Lopez
- Succeeded by: Carlina Rivera

Personal details
- Born: February 28, 1963 (age 63) New York City, New York, U.S.
- Party: Democratic
- Education: New York University; Rutgers Law School
- Website: Official website

Rosie Méndez (born February 28, 1963) is an American Democratic politician who served in the New York City Council from the 2nd district from 2006 to 2017. Méndez's district included all or parts of Chelsea, the East Village, the Flatiron District, Gramercy, Greenwich Village, the Lower East Side, Midtown, Murray Hill, NoHo, and Stuyvesant Town in Manhattan.

As of 2023, she is director of Community Affairs for Manhattan Borough President Gale Brewer.

== Early life and education ==
Méndez grew up in the Williamsburg Houses, a New York City Housing Authority development. The child of Puerto Rican parents, she attended New York City public schools through high school. She graduated from New York University and Rutgers Law School in Newark. In 2011, Méndez completed Harvard University's John F. Kennedy School of Government program for Senior Executives in State and Local Government as a David Bohnett Leadership Fellow.

== Career ==
She began as a tenant organizer in Williamsburg, Brooklyn. She then worked on citywide housing issues as a housing specialist at the Parodneck Foundation. In 1995, Méndez graduated from law school and worked as an IOLA Legal Services Fellow at Brooklyn Legal Services. As a legal staff worker she became a member of the United Auto Workers (UAW).

Prior to her election to the council, Méndez was the Democratic District Leader for her community for four terms. She served for three years as the Chief of Staff and Legislative Aide to her predecessor City Councilwoman Margarita Lopez.

=== New York City Council ===
In 2005, Méndez won the heavily contested Democratic primary for New York City's 2nd City Council district. In the heavily Democratic district, the primary victory was considered tantamount to election. After a landslide victory in the general election in November 2005, Méndez took office as the 2nd district's councilwoman in January 2006. She was re-elected in 2009 and 2013. Méndez was term-limited in the 2017 election.

In 2017 she endorsed and was succeeded by her former legislative director Carlina Rivera.

==== Animal rights ====
In June 2006, Méndez announced legislation to ban the use of wild animals in circuses. The bill received substantial support from other Council Members, including future Mayor Bill de Blasio, future Council Speaker Melissa Mark-Viverito, future Public Advocate Letitia James and future Manhattan Borough President Gale Brewer. Méndez, at a rally that year organized by the League of Humane Voters of New York City, told the media "We cannot say we’re an enlightened society when we allow animals to be tortured and abused for entertainment purposes." Though the bill had 25 co-sponsors, Council Speaker Christine Quinn strongly opposed the legislation and the bill died at the end of session. Méndez reintroduced the bill again in 2010 and then again in 2016. In June 2017, the bill was voted out of the Health Committee unanimously. On June 21, 2017, the Council passed Méndez's bill by a vote of 43–6. From the floor of the council, Méndez thanked her "friend and constituent" John Phillips, who led the campaign to pass the bill and who brought the issue to her attention in 2006.

== Election history ==
New York City Council District 2: Results 2005 to 2013
Year	Democratic	Votes	Pct	Republican	Votes	Pct	3rd Party	Party	Votes	Pct
2005	Rosie Méndez	21,341	80%	John Carlino	4,805	18%	Claudia Flanagan	Liberal	686	2%
2009	Rosie Méndez	19,952	85%	Bryan A. Cooper	3,772	15%				
2013	Rosie Méndez	20,419	92%				Miles Budde	Green	1,490	7%

== Personal life ==
Méndez is openly lesbian and was the chairperson of the New York City Council's LGBT Caucus.

== See also ==
- LGBT culture in New York City
- List of LGBT people from New York City
- NYC Pride March
- Nuyorican
- Puerto Ricans in New York City

Political offices
Preceded by Margarita Lopez	New York City Council, 2nd district 2006–2017	Succeeded by Carlina Rivera
