= Carlina Rivera =

New York politician (born 1984)

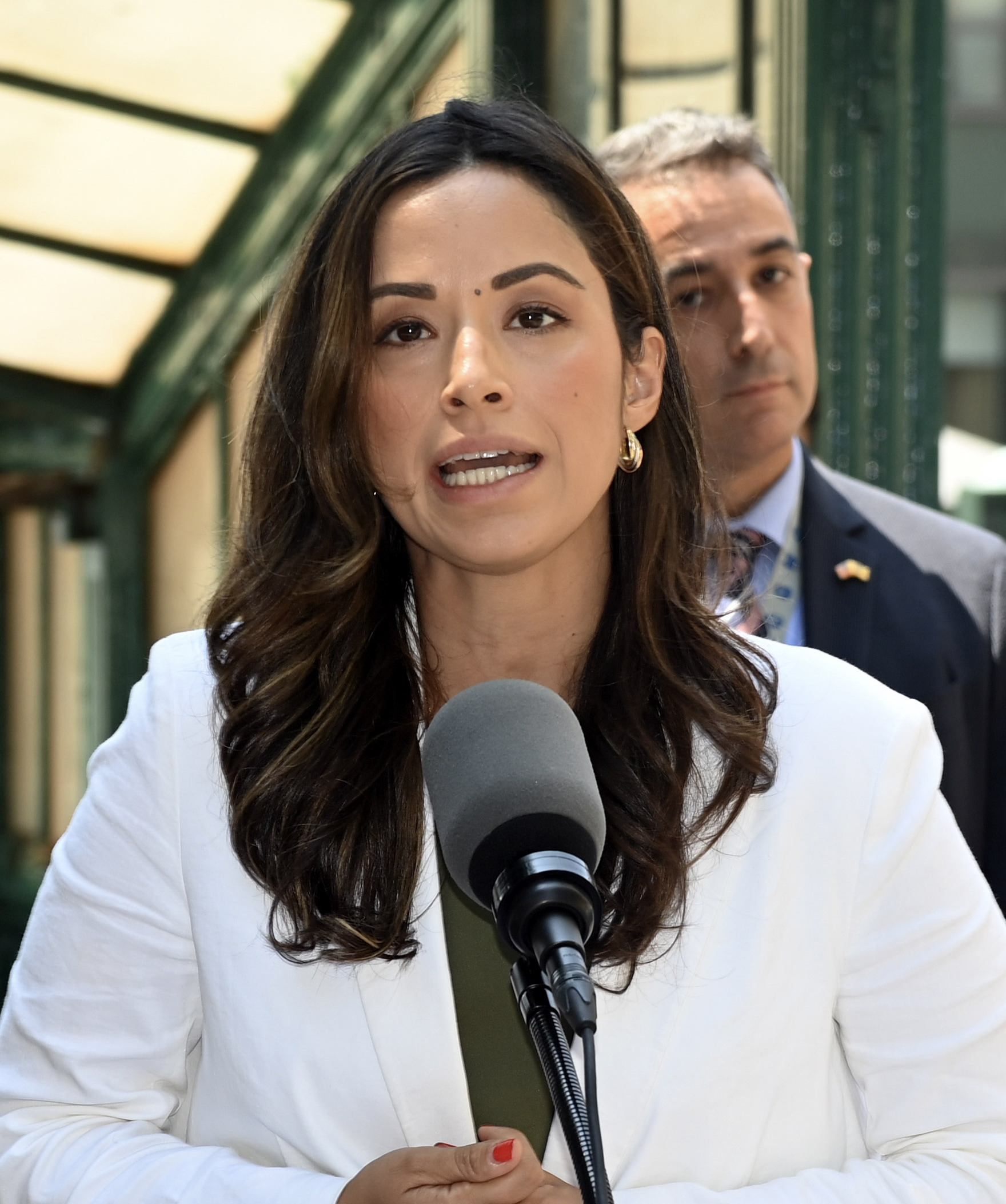

Member of the New York City Council from the 2nd district
- In office January 1, 2018 – August 20, 2025
- Preceded by: Rosie Mendez
- Succeeded by: Harvey Epstein

Personal details
- Born: January 3, 1984 (age 42) New York City, New York, U.S.
- Party: Democratic
- Spouse: Jamie Rogers
- Children: 2
- Education: Marist College (BA)
- Website: City Council website Campaign website

Carlina Rivera (born January 3, 1984) is a former American politician who represented the 2nd district of the New York City Council from 2018 to 2025. A member of the Democratic Party, her district includes portions of the East Village, Gramercy Park, Kips Bay, Lower East Side, Murray Hill, and Rose Hill in Manhattan.

After working in the private sector and New York City government, Rivera launched her campaign for City Council in 2016, winning her Democratic primary with over 60% of the vote. She served almost eight years as Council Member before resigning to become the president and CEO of the New York State Association for Affordable Housing (NYSAFAH).

== Early life and education ==
Rivera grew up on the Lower East Side, where she was raised in low-income and Section 8 housing. Her mother was born in Las Marias in Puerto Rico and grew up in Brooklyn, her father grew up in the Lower East Side. She graduated from Notre Dame School in Manhattan, then located on St. Marks Place, and Marist College in Poughkeepsie, New York, where she majored in journalism.

== Career ==
Rivera began her career working in New York City public schools, providing afterschool enrichment programs in Math and English Language Arts. She went on to work at Lawyers Alliance for New York, and then became the director of programs and services at Good Old Lower East Side (GOLES), a local nonprofit organization focused on neighborhood housing and preservation, economic development, and community revitalization. She was also a member of Manhattan Community Board 3 and later worked in the New York City Council, serving as the legislative director for Rosie Mendez.

=== New York City Council ===
==== 2016–17 City Council campaign ====
Rivera launched her campaign for City Council in 2016, running for the 2nd District, which encompasses the East Village, Flatiron, Gramercy Park, Rose Hill, Kips Bay, Murray Hill, and the Lower East Side. A first-time candidate who participated in public financing, she raised $176,000 through the city's matching funds program. Rivera was endorsed by the Working Families Party, then City Public Advocate Letitia James, then City Comptroller Scott Stringer, Rep. Nydia Velázquez, and the City Council's Progressive Caucus.

Rivera and her husband, Jamie Rogers, lived in a federally subsidized, low-income Section 8 apartment with an annual income limit of $61,050 for a family of two. Rogers, a former corporate lawyer at Sullivan & Cromwell, owns a growing coffee business, a Grand Street co-op apartment in Lower Manhattan, which he rents out, and a small family trust fund. Pictures of Rogers on a yacht owned by his father William P. Rogers Jr., a retired partner at Cravath, Swaine & Moore, were deleted before the Democratic primary. Their eligibility was questioned as Rivera's salary as a City Council staffer was $41,770, which means her husband would have had to earn less than $20,000 a year in order for the family to be under the limit. Rogers explained his financial situation in an interview with The Villager and defended their eligibility due to his struggling coffee business and substantial debt.

Rivera won the Democratic primary for New York City's 2nd City Council district in 2017 with 60.54% of the vote (8,354 votes). She went on to win the general election with 82.86% of the vote against Republican and perennial candidate Jimmy McMillan and several third-party candidates.

==== Tenure ====
In 2019, as a co-chair of the Women's Caucus, Rivera was involved in securing $250,000 for the New York Abortion Access Fund to provide abortions for women not covered by insurance or Medicaid, including for those who travel from out-of-state. This funding made New York City the first to allocate money directly to abortion procedures. She has called for more aid to reach the city's public hospital system, including funding and programs around reproductive healthcare. She also introduced a legislation to create a patient advocate's office within the Department of Health and Mental Hygiene to help New Yorkers navigate the healthcare system.

In the same year, Rivera introduced legislations to create an Office of Active Transportation and Office of Pedestrians to assess conditions for safe biking and walking in the city and make recommendations for improvements. She introduced and passed a legislation to strengthen protections for renters during periods of maintenance, renovation, and construction. She introduced a legislation to require child protective specialists to explain to parents or caretakers about their rights during initial contact of an ACS investigation. and passed bills to outlaw the sale of foie gras and outlaw pigeon trafficking. In an effort to crack down on illegal hotel operators, she introduced a bill in June 2018 to require short-term rental companies such as Airbnb to report host data to the city. The bill passed the Council 45–0 and was signed into law by Mayor Bill de Blasio on August 6, 2018.

Rivera came under criticism for supporting the construction of the workforce development center Civic Hall, the waterfront renovation the East Side Coastal Resiliency Project, and the rezoning of SoHo and NoHo neighborhoods in downtown Manhattan, all within her Council district boundaries. All three land use applications were eventually approved by the New York City Council.

Rivera was featured as a Thought Leader in V Magazine in 2020 for her advocacy in voting rights expansion. She was listed on City & State’s 2020’s Above and Beyond as a Lower East Side success story.

In June 2022, Rivera voted for a controversial $101 billion budget that will cut funding for the city's Department of Education by $600 million, citing "fundamental flaws" in the Fair Student Funding formula.

Rivera was Chair of the council's Committee on Hospitals and member of the council's Women's Caucus, Progressive, and Black, Latino, and Asian Caucuses.

In December 2024, Rivera was one of 31 council members to vote for a revised version of Adams' new zoning legislation called The City of Yes. It is a $5 billion proposal to allow the construction and conversion of legal and new 80,000 housing units in New York City.

=== 2022 Congressional campaign ===
Rivera announced her candidacy for the U.S. House of Representatives in early June 2022 to represent the newly redistricted New York's 10th congressional district. She was the only candidate that currently lives outside the district but has said that she will move into it if elected. She was endorsed by Rep. Nydia Velázquez, Rep. Adriano Espaillat, Brooklyn Borough President Antonio Reynoso, Manhattan Borough President Mark Levine, several City Council members, and unions such as 1199SEIU and Transport Workers Union of America.

Rivera has been a supporter of allowing more density and affordable housing in the Manhattan neighborhoods of SoHo and NoHo. She supported a Habitat for Humanity project to build low-income senior housing in a wealthy neighborhood's community garden, a project that other New York politicians opposed.

She has been a strong proponent of efforts to rebuild East River Park at higher elevation to make the neighborhood less vulnerable to storms. Rivera was the only top candidate in the Democratic primary to not support allocating 100% of residential units in the proposed 5 World Trade Center in Lower Manhattan as affordable housing. She raised a large amount of money from major real estate developers and lobbyists, including billionaire real estate developer Jed Walentas of Two Trees, Kirk Goodrich, Don Capoccia, Robert Levine of RAL Companies, Bruce Teitelbaum, and Daniel R. Tishman of Tishman Realty & Construction, the firm that managed the building of One World Trade Center. The New York Times reported she reached out to at least two other executives in the real estate industry for donations as of August 2022.

Rivera drew criticisms of treating LGBTQ+ New Yorkers as "political chess pieces" when she expressed support for religious exemptions that target members of the community in response to a question about her stance on the well-known same-sex wedding cake case in Colorado during an interview with Hamodia. Rivera said she has put religious exemptions in legislation in the past and is "willing to explore that and do it on the federal level." She walked back her statement and clarified that she opposes giving private businesses a pass on discriminating against LGBTQ+ people.

Rivera was met with backlash for seemingly inviting PAC money by adding a "red box" to her website. She was also called out by then-rival congressional candidate Dan Goldman for her investments in defense contractors Lockheed Martin and Northrop Grumman, as well as the gun company Smith & Wesson.

Rivera finished in fourth place in the crowded Democratic primary with 10,985 votes (17%), losing to Dan Goldman.

== Post New York City Council Public Service and Career ==
Carlina Rivera announced she would resign from The New York City Council in August 2025 to lead the New York State Association for Affordable Housing. She is term-limited and would have left the council in January 2026 if she did not accept her new position.

== Electoral history ==
=== Congress, 2022 ===
2022 New York's 10th congressional district Democratic primary
Party	Candidate	Votes	%
Democratic	Dan Goldman	16,686	25.8
Democratic	Yuh-Line Niou	15,380	23.7
Democratic	Mondaire Jones (incumbent) (Note: Due to redistricting, Mondaire Jones decided to move to NY-10, which is not connected by territory to his home district of NY-17.)	11,777	18.2
Democratic	Carlina Rivera	10,985	17.0
Democratic	Jo Anne Simon	3,991	6.2
Democratic	Elizabeth Holtzman	2,845	4.4
Democratic	Jimmy Li	777	1.2
Democratic	Yan Xiong	686	1.1
Democratic	Maud Maron	578	0.9
Democratic	Bill de Blasio (withdrawn)	477	0.7
Democratic	Brian Robinson	322	0.5
Democratic	Peter Gleason	147	0.2
Democratic	Quanda Francis	121	0.2
Total votes		64,772	100.0

=== 2023 ===
2023 New York City Council election, District 2
Primary election
Party	Candidate	Votes	%
Democratic	Carlina Rivera	4,229	60.07
Democratic	Allie Ryan	2,747	39.02
Total votes		7,040	96.12

=== 2021 ===
2021 New York City Council election, District 2
Primary election
Party	Candidate	Votes	%
Democratic	Carlina Rivera (incumbent)	15,464	72.5
Democratic	Erin Hussein	5,709	26.8
Total votes		21,342	100
General election
Democratic	Carlina Rivera (incumbent)	18,716	79.8
Neighborhood	Allie Ryan	2,864	12.2
Independent	Juan Pagan	1,925	8.2
Total votes		23,441	100
Democratic hold			

=== 2017 ===
2017 New York City Council election, District 2
Primary election
Party	Candidate	Votes	%
Democratic	Carlina Rivera	8,354	60.5
Democratic	Mary Silver	2,282	16.5
Democratic	Ronnie Sung Cho	1,181	8.6
Democratic	Jorge Vasquez	1,040	7.5
Democratic	Jasmin Sanchez	638	4.6
Democratic	Erin Hussein	267	1.9
Total votes		13,800	100
General election
Democratic	Carlina Rivera	18,047	
Working Families	Carlina Rivera	2,003	
Total	Carlina Rivera	20,050	82.7
Republican	Jimmy McMillan	2,609	
Rent Is Too Damn High	Jimmy McMillan	228	
Total	Jimmy McMillan	2,837	11.7
Liberal	Jasmin Sanchez	487	2.0
Libertarian	Don Garrity	434	1.8
Green	Manny Cavaco	375	1.5
Total votes		24,246	100
Democratic hold			

== Personal life ==
She and her husband, Jamie Rogers, a Connecticut College and Cornell Law School graduate, lived on the Lower East Side until June 2021 when they moved to Kips Bay. On WNYC's Brian Lehrer Show, on January 11, 2022, she claimed that "the Lower East Side is my home."

Rivera has two children. One of whom, a son, who she gave birth to in February 2023.

Rivera was a member of the Democratic Socialists of America as of 2017 but is no longer.

== See also ==
- List of Democratic Socialists of America members who have held office in the United States
