= Michael Browne =

Michael Browne may refer to:

- Michael Browne (cardinal) (1887–1971), Irish cardinal
- Michael Browne (bishop of Galway) (1895–1980), Irish bishop of Galway
- Michael Browne (Antigua and Barbuda politician), government minister
- Michael Browne (Irish politician) (1930–2008), Irish Fine Gael politician from Mayo
- Michael Browne (Australian footballer) (1954–2009), Australian rules footballer for Collingwood
- Michael Browne (rugby league), rugby league footballer for Ireland, and Tallaght Tigers

== See also ==
- Michael Brown (disambiguation)
- Mick Brown (disambiguation)
