= Miriam Friedlander =

American politician (1914–2009)

Member of the New York City Council from the 2nd district
- In office January 1, 1975 – December 31, 1991
- Preceded by: Carol Greitzer
- Succeeded by: Antonio Pagán

Member of the New York City Council from the 3rd district
- In office January 1, 1974 – December 31, 1974
- Preceded by: Theodore S. Weiss
- Succeeded by: Carol Greitzer

Personal details
- Born: April 8, 1914 Pittsburgh, Pennsylvania, U.S.
- Died: October 4, 2009 (aged 95) Manhattan, New York, U.S.
- Party: Democratic

Miriam Friedlander (April 8, 1914, Pittsburgh, Pennsylvania – October 4, 2009, Manhattan) was an American politician from the Bronx who represented New York City's Lower East Side and Chinatown in the New York City Council from 1974 to 1991.

== Biography ==
Friedlander was born to a Jewish family in Pittsburgh, Pennsylvania, in 1914. Her father, David Sigel (Sigelovytch), was an office worker, insurance salesman, and political activist in the immigrant foreign language clubs. Her mother Hannah Lipman (Goldotsky) was fluent in Russian, Hebrew, Yiddish, and English. Miriam moved with her family to The Bronx as at the age of five in 1919. She graduated from Evander Childs High School in 1931 and New York University's College of Education in 1935. In 1939, she married Mark Friedlander, and their son Paul was born in New York City in 1943. The marriage ended in divorce in 1954. Her brother Paul died in 1938 fighting for the Republican side during the Spanish Civil War, according to a 2008 profile published in The Villager, a community newspaper on the Lower East Side. In 1962, Friedlander was one of ten U.S. Communist Party officials told by Attorney General Robert F. Kennedy to register with the Subversive Activities Control Board. Friedlander was identified as a member of the New York party committee.

In 1973, Friedlander won the Democratic primary for the 2nd district of the City Council, which then included SoHo, Chinatown, the East Village and the Lower East Side, by a mere 48 votes, defeating four opponents. She had to defend her seat the following year, due to a court-ordered legislative reapportionment. In the Democratic Party primary election she defeated a then-little known lawyer named Sheldon Silver, by just 95 votes.

In 1985, she ran against another Chinatown candidate, Virginia Kee.

== LGBT issues ==
William K. Dobbs, a longtime gay activist who got to know Ms. Friedlander in the 1970s and 1980s, described her as a strong, and early, advocate of gay rights.

"When she made a point, it was a physical action," he said in a phone interview. "She'd pull her arm back and crook her elbow. She was a real brawler as a politician, and she fought fiercely in what she believed in."

== Death ==
Friedlander died on October 4, 2009, aged 95. Prior to her death, Friedlander supported the candidacies of John Liu and Mark Green.

Political offices
Preceded by Theodore S. Weiss	Member of the New York City Council from the 3rd district 1974–1974	Succeeded by Carol Greitzer
Preceded by Carol Greitzer	Member of the New York City Council from the 2nd district 1975–1991	Succeeded by Antonio Pagán
