= Jane Wood (activist) =

American tenant rights activist and co-founder of Chelsea Coalition on Housing

Jane Wood (born Janet Kauffman; 1907 – 2003) was an American tenant rights activist who co-founded the Chelsea Coalition on Housing.

== Early life and education ==
Wood was born in St. Louis to banker Harold M. Kauffman and Jeanette Morton, a Mayflower descendant. She attended Smith College, where Anne Morrow (later Anne Morrow Lindbergh) served as her sorority mentor.

== Career ==
After moving to New York City in the 1930s, Wood joined socialist organizations and became involved in anti-poverty work. In the mid-1950s, she helped establish the Chelsea Coalition on Housing, while protesting the Penn Station South redevelopment. The coalition sought priority placement for low-income residents displaced by the project and later opposed rent increases and evictions across Chelsea. Over subsequent decades, Wood became a fixture at rent strikes, Rent Guidelines Board hearings and street rallies, often credited with preventing the eviction of hundreds of households as Chelsea gentrified.

== Personal life ==
In the 1940s, she married Robert Wood, an activist and cigar importer. After his death in 1963, she continued to travel to Cuba, delivering supplies and expressing support for the Cuban government.
