= New York City's 2nd City Council district =

- Boundaries following the 2020 census

Government
  - Councilmember: Harvey Epstein (D—East Village)

Population (2010)
  - Total: 161,544

Demographics
  - White: 56%
  - Hispanic: 20%
  - Asian: 15%
  - Black: 6%
  - Other: 3%

Registration
  - Democratic: 68.0%
  - Republican: 8.3%
  - No party preference: 20.4%
- Registered voters (2021) 126,576

New York City's 2nd City Council district is one of 51 districts in the New York City Council. It has been represented by Harvey Epstein since 2025, succeeding fellow Democrat Carlina Rivera, who was term-limited and resigned on August 20, 2025.

== Geography ==
District 2 is based in Manhattan's Lower East Side and East Village, also covering the neighborhoods of Alphabet City, Gramercy Park, Kips Bay, Loisaida, Murray Hill, and Rose Hill.

The district overlaps with Manhattan Community Boards 2, 3, 5, and 6, and with New York's 7th and 12th congressional districts. It also overlaps with the 26th, 27th, and 28th districts of the New York State Senate, and with the 65th, 66th, 73rd, 74th, and 75th districts of the New York State Assembly.

Although it is majority-white, the district has a large Hispanic population concentrated in the Loisaida neighborhood. Between 1991 and 2025, the district was represented by four consecutive Hispanic councilmembers, three of whom have also been gay.

== Recent election results ==
=== 2025 ===
The Democratic primary for this district received national attention due to former U.S. Representative and city councilman Anthony Weiner's primary campaign, as part of a political comeback after a sexting scandal resulted in prison time. He finished fourth; state assemblymember Harvey Epstein won the nomination.

2025 New York City Council election, District 2 Democratic primary
Party	Candidate	Maximum round	Maximum votes	Share in maximum round	Maximum votes First round votes Transfer votes
Democratic	Harvey Epstein	4	14,703	56.8%	
Democratic	Sarah Batchu	4	11,182	43.2%	
Democratic	Andrea Gordillo	3	6,898	24.8%	
Democratic	Anthony Weiner	2	3,079	10.2%	
Democratic	Allie Ryan	2	2,398	7.9%	
Write-in		1	133	0.4%	

2025 New York City Council election, District 2 general election
Party	Candidate	Votes	%
Democratic	Harvey Epstein	36,003	
Working Families	Harvey Epstein	6,373	
Total	Harvey Epstein	42,376	78.0
Republican	Jason Murillo	8,267	
Conservative	Jason Murillo	704	
Total	Jason Murillo	8,971	16.5
Unity	Allie Ryan	1,720	3.2
CleanSafeStreet	Gail Schargel	1,165	2.1
Write-in		101	0.2
Total votes		54,333	100.0
Democratic hold			

=== 2023 ===
Due to redistricting and the 2020 changes to the New York City Charter, councilmembers elected during the 2021 and 2023 City Council elections will serve two-year terms, with full four-year terms resuming after the 2025 New York City Council elections.

2023 New York City Council election, District 2
Primary election
Party	Candidate	Votes	%
Democratic	Carlina Rivera (incumbent)	4,688	60.5
Democratic	Allie Ryan	2,980	38.5
Write-in		76	1.0
Total votes		7,685	100.0
General election
Democratic	Carlina Rivera	8,627	
Working Families	Carlina Rivera	1,510	
Total	Carlina Rivera (incumbent)	10,137	92.3
Write-in		780	7.7
Total votes		10,917	100
Democratic hold			

=== 2021 ===
An interactive map of District 2

In 2019, voters in New York City approved Ballot Question 1, which implemented ranked-choice voting in all local elections. Under the new system, voters have the option to rank up to five candidates for every local office. Voters whose first-choice candidates fare poorly will have their votes redistributed to other candidates in their ranking until one candidate surpasses the 50 percent threshold. If one candidate surpasses 50 percent in first-choice votes, then ranked-choice tabulations will not occur.

2021 New York City Council election, District 2
Primary election
Party	Candidate	Votes	%
Democratic	Carlina Rivera (incumbent)	15,464	72.4
Democratic	Erin Hussein	5,709	26.8
Write-in		169	0.8
Total votes		21,342	100
General election
Democratic	Carlina Rivera (incumbent)	18,716	79.9
Neighborhood	Allie Ryan	2,684	11.4
Independent	Juan Pagan	1,925	8.2
Write-in		113	0.5
Total votes		23,438	100
Democratic hold			

=== 2017 ===
2017 New York City Council election, District 2
Primary election
Party	Candidate	Votes	%
Democratic	Carlina Rivera	8,354	60.5
Democratic	Mary Silver	2,282	16.5
Democratic	Ronnie Sung Cho	1,181	8.6
Democratic	Jorge Vasquez	1,040	7.5
Democratic	Jasmin Sanchez	638	4.6
Democratic	Erin Hussein	267	1.9
Write-in		38	0.4
Total votes		13,800	100
General election
Democratic	Carlina Rivera	18,047	
Working Families	Carlina Rivera	2,003	
Total	Carlina Rivera	20,050	82.7
Republican	Jimmy McMillan	2,609	
Rent Is Too Damn High	Jimmy McMillan	228	
Total	Jimmy McMillan	2,837	11.7
Liberal	Jasmin Sanchez	487	2.0
Libertarian	Don Garrity	434	1.8
Green	Manny Cavaco	375	1.5
Write-in		59	0.3
Total votes		24,242	100
Democratic hold			

=== 2013 ===
2013 New York City Council election, District 2
Primary election
Party	Candidate	Votes	%
Democratic	Rosie Méndez (incumbent)	12,507	81.6
Democratic	Richard Del Rio	2,809	18.3
Write-in		13	0.1
Total votes		15,329	100
General election
Democratic	Rosie Méndez	18,928	
Working Families	Rosie Méndez	1,491	
Total	Rosie Méndez (incumbent)	20,419	93.0
Green	Miles Budde	1,490	6.8
Write-in		59	0.2
Total votes		21,968	100
Democratic hold			

== Previous councilmembers ==
The district is a safe Democratic district. Between 1974 and 1991, it was represented by Miriam Friedlander, who was narrowly defeated in the 1991 Democratic Party primary by Antonio Pagán, the first openly gay politician to represent the district. Pagán's conservative stances and support for Mayor Rudy Giuliani alienated large segments of his liberal-leaning constituency. In 1997, Pagán launched an unsuccessful campaign for Manhattan Borough President; he was succeeded on the council by Margarita López. In 2005, Rosie Méndez succeeded López, and was re-elected in 2009. Carlina Rivera succeeded Méndez in 2017, becoming the district's first straight councilmember in well over two decades.
