= Michael F. Brown =

American chemist

Michael F. Brown (born 1948) is an American chemist. Since 1987, he has been a Professor of Chemistry at the University of Arizona, and since 2003 has held joint appointments as a Professor of Physics and Professor of Applied Mathematics. Prior to the University of Arizona, Brown earned tenure at the University of Virginia. His research involves the application of NMR spectroscopy and other biophysical methods to study membrane lipids, liquid crystals, and membrane proteins. Brown has particularly been a pioneer in the application of solid-state NMR spectroscopy to the study of lipid bilayer dynamics.

== Early life and education ==
Brown was born in Los Angeles, California. He received the A.B. degree in 1970 from the University of California, Santa Cruz. While an undergraduate, he conducted research in nuclear magnetic resonance (NMR) spectroscopy at the nearby Laboratory of Chemical Biodynamics at the University of California, Berkeley, and continued this during his doctoral studies at Santa Cruz. He received a Ph.D. degree in 1975.

== Career ==
Brown was awarded a postdoctoral fellowship from the U.S. National Institutes of Health (NIH) to conduct research in Europe. He spent three years working with Joachim Seelig at the Biozentrum of the University of Basel in Switzerland, and with Ulrich Häberlen at the Max Planck Institute in Heidelberg, Germany. Brown then joined the laboratory of Wayne L. Hubbell in the Department of Chemistry of the University of California, Berkeley.

In 1980, Brown became an assistant professor at the University of Virginia. He received a Sloan Fellowship and a NIH Research Career Development Award, and was promoted to associate professor with tenure in 1985. In 1987, he joined the faculty of the University of Arizona as full professor in the Department of Chemistry (now Chemistry and Biochemistry). He is a member of the Committee on Neuroscience and the Applied Mathematics Program.

Brown has been a visiting professor at Lund University, Sweden, the University of Würzburg, Germany, the University of Florence, Italy, and Osaka University, Japan.

== Awards and honors ==
Brown is an Elected Fellow of the American Physical Society, the Biophysical Society, and the American Association for the Advancement of Science. He is also a winner of the Avanti Award in Lipids of the Biophysical Society, and currently serves on the editorial board for the Biophysical Journal.
