= Mick Brown (judge) =

New Zealand judge (1937–2015)

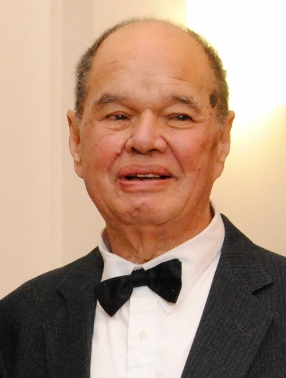
Brown in 2013

Michael John Albert Brown CNZM (19 August 1937 – 2 April 2015) was a New Zealand judge. In 1980, he became the first Māori to be appointed as a District Court judge, and he was later the first principal Youth Court judge.

== Early life and family ==
Born in the Far North in 1937, Brown affiliated to Ngāti Kahu, Te Aupōuri, Te Rarawa and Ngāpuhi. His father was elderly and his mother died in Auckland from tuberculosis when Brown was one year old. He was subsequently fostered by the Flood family in Mount Albert. Brown's knee was affected by tuberculosis, and he spent three years between 1948 and 1951 at the Wilson School for disabled children in Takapuna, where he was friends with Bruce McLaren.

He was educated at Mount Albert Grammar School from 1951 to 1956.

== Legal career ==
Brown initially pursued a career in teaching, but he was drawn to the law by a love of debating. He studied law at the University of Auckland, where he became friends with other law students including David Lange, Anand Satyanand, Sian Elias, Jim McLay and Doug Graham. After practising law in Auckland, Brown was appointed as a judge of the District Court in 1980, becoming the first Māori to hold that position. (Note: Ken Mason (Ngāi Tahu) was the first Maori to be appointed to the judiciary as a Stipendary Magistrate (later designated District Court Judge) in June 1970. He was, therefore, the first Maori judicial officer.)

Following the Queen Street riot in December 1984, Brown acquitted DD Smash lead singer Dave Dobbyn of charges of behaving in a manner likely to cause violence against person or property and using insulting language.

In 1989, Brown was appointed the first principal judge of the Youth Court, a specialist division of the District Court, and held that office until 1995.

== University governance ==
Brown served as a member of the University of Auckland Council for 15 years and was the university's chancellor from 1986 to 1991. He was also pro vice-chancellor (Māori) at the university until 2005.

== Honours and awards ==
In 1990, Brown received the New Zealand 1990 Commemoration Medal. He was awarded an honorary LLD by the University of Auckland in 1992. In the 1996 Queen's Birthday Honours, he was appointed a Companion of the New Zealand Order of Merit, for services to the Youth Court, education and the community. In 2002, he received a distinguished alumni award from the University of Auckland, and in 2013 he was awarded the Blake Medal for leadership by the Sir Peter Blake Trust.
