= Timothy's Law =

New York State mental health parity law enacted in 2007

Timothy's Law is the reference used for a New York state statute signed into law on December 22, 2006 by Governor George E. Pataki which took effect January 1, 2007. The law requires that health plans sold in the state provide comparable coverage for mental health ailments as they do for physical ailments. This is often referred to as mental health parity. The law was named after Timothy, a boy from Schenectady, NY who died by suicide at age 12 in 2001 after his family's health plan exhausted its mental health benefits.

== History ==
The law was named after Timothy, a boy from Schenectady, NY who died by suicide at age 12 on March 16, 2001. Timothy had been diagnosed with several behavioral disorders including severe depression but had exhausted the mental health benefits on his family's health plan. As a result, the O'Clairs were forced to relinquish full custody of their child in order to make him eligible for Medicaid which paid for all the services which Timothy needed. However, when Timothy returned home, he once again was bound by the limits of his parents' medical insurance benefits. In 2003, 2 years after Timothy's death, Timothy's parents joined other mental health advocates and lent Timothy's name to the parity movement in the state of New York and petitioned the state government to pass a law that would require health plans to provide coverage for mental health ailments and behavioral disorders that were comparable to coverage for physical ailments.

"Timothy's Law" was sponsored by Senators Thomas Morahan and Thomas Libous and passed the state senate on September 15, 2006. It was sponsored by Assembly Members Paul Tonko and Peter Rivera and passed the Assembly consecutively for 5 years. Timothy's Law was sent to the governor on December 13, 2006 who later signed it into law. A condition of Timothy's Law passing the NY state legislature was it have a 2-year sunset clause to provide for an actuarial study on the cost effectiveness (the shortest sunset of any law in NY state history). Timothy's Law became effective January 1, 2007. In May, 2009, the Superintendent of the New York State Insurance Department released the actuarial study on the cost effectiveness of Timothy's Law, and reported that the law had considerably increased mental health parity at a nominal cost to employers. It stated that neither consumers nor brokers viewed the mandates as a significant issue relative to cost or their overall purchasing decision.

After both houses of the NY legislature voted to make Timothy's Law permanent in the 2009 session, Governor Patterson signed the bill into law on July 11, 2009. "Timothy's Law" was originally set to expire on December 31, 2009.

== Major provisions ==
The legislation included several provisions that affect the way health insurers in the state cover mental health services.

- Coverage must be included in plans for at least 30 days of inpatient care and at least 20 days of outpatient treatment with a psychiatrist or psychologist in a state-certified facility, a facility operated by the state, or a group or academic practice.
- Plans must have premiums and patient cost-sharing for services that are consistent with the costs for physical treatments.
- Plans for employers with 50 or more eligible employees must provide unlimited coverage for biologically based mental illnesses, defined as schizophrenia/psychotic disorders, major depression, bipolar disorder, delusional disorders, panic disorder, Obsessive–compulsive disorder, bulimia, anorexia, and binge eating. Plans for employers with 49 or less employees must offer this coverage as an option.
- Children under age 18 must be covered for serious suicidal symptoms or other life-threatening self-destructive behaviors, significant psychotic symptoms, behavior caused by emotional disturbance that places the child at risk of causing personal injury or significant property damage, or behavior caused by emotional disturbances that place the child at substantial risk of removal from the household.
- The law requires the state to develop a method to help small employers pay for the additional biologically-based coverage if elected.

== General references ==
- NYS Bill and Veto Jackets: 2006, Chapter 748, New York State Archives, 22 December 2006
