= New York's 27th State Senate district =

American legislative district

Senator
Brian Kavanagh; D–Manhattan
- Registration: 65.5% Democratic; 10.1% Republican; 20.8% No party preference
- Demographics: 65% White; 5% Black; 13% Hispanic; 14% Asian
- Population (2017): 323,440
- Registered voters: 244,688

New York's 27th State Senate district is one of 63 districts in the New York State Senate. It has been represented by Democrat Brian Kavanagh since 2023.

== Geography ==
District 27 covers much of Lower Manhattan, including some or all of Greenwich Village, the East Village, Tribeca, Little Italy, Chinatown, Soho, and the Financial District.

The district overlaps with New York's 7th, 10th, and 12th congressional districts, and with the 65th, 66th, 67th, 73rd, 74th, and 75th districts of the New York State Assembly.

== Recent election results ==
=== 2026 ===
2026 New York State Senate election, District 27
Primary election
Party	Candidate	Votes	%
Democratic	Grace Lee	18,832	62.1
Democratic	Yuh-Line Niou	11,429	37.7
Write-in		88	0.2
Total votes		30,349	100.0
General election
Democratic	Grace Lee		
Working Families	Grace Lee		
Total	Grace Lee		
Republican	Jason Murillo		
Conservative	Jason Murillo		
Total	Jason Murillo		
Write-in			
Total votes			100.0

=== 2024 ===
2024 New York State Senate election, District 27
Party	Candidate	Votes	%
Democratic	Brian Kavanagh	79,048	
Working Families	Brian Kavanagh	9,169	
Total	Brian Kavanagh (incumbent)	88,217	99.1
Write-in		805	0.9
Total votes		89,022	100.0
Democratic hold			

=== 2022 ===
2022 New York State Senate election, District 27
Primary election
Party	Candidate	Votes	%
Democratic	Brian Kavanagh	14,117	58.0
Democratic	Vittoria Fariello	7,110	29.2
Democratic	Danyela Egorov	2,979	12.2
Write-in		147	0.6
Total votes		24,353	100.0
General election
Democratic	Brian Kavanagh	62,906	95.4
Medical Freedom	Eric Rassi	2,684	4.0
Write-in		378	0.6
Total votes		65,968	100.0
Democratic win (new boundaries)			

=== 2020 ===
2020 New York State Senate election, District 27
Primary election
Party	Candidate	Votes	%
Democratic	Brad Hoylman (incumbent)	31,926	74.2
Democratic	Elizabeth Glass	10,959	25.5
Write-in		147	0.3
Total votes		43,032	100.0
General election
Democratic	Brad Hoylman	110,256	
Working Families	Brad Hoylman	17,686	
Total	Brad Hoylman (incumbent)	127,942	99.1
Write-in		1,100	0.9
Total votes		129,042	100.0
Democratic hold			

=== 2018 ===
2018 New York State Senate election, District 27
Party	Candidate	Votes	%
Democratic	Brad Hoylman	99,229	
Working Families	Brad Hoylman	8,004	
Total	Brad Hoylman (incumbent)	107,233	99.2
Write-in		878	0.9
Total votes		108,111	100.0
Democratic hold			

=== 2016 ===
2016 New York State Senate election, District 27
Party	Candidate	Votes	%
Democratic	Brad Hoylman	110,400	
Working Families	Brad Hoylman	7,971	
Total	Brad Hoylman (incumbent)	118,371	95.4
Roberts Party	Stephen Roberts	5,317	4.3
Write-in		381	0.3
Total votes		124,069	100.0
Democratic hold			

=== 2014 ===
2014 New York State Senate election, District 27
Party	Candidate	Votes	%
Democratic	Brad Hoylman	36,822	
Working Families	Brad Hoylman	9,307	
Total	Brad Hoylman (incumbent)	46,129	85.4
Republican	Frank Scala	7,829	14.5
Write-in		69	0.1
Total votes		54,027	100.0
Democratic hold			

=== 2012 ===
2012 New York State Senate election, District 27
Primary election
Party	Candidate	Votes	%
Democratic	Brad Hoylman	8,807	67.3
Democratic	Thomas Greco	3,088	23.6
Democratic	Tanika Inlaw	1,156	8.8
Write-in		32	0.3
Total votes		13,083	100.0
General election
Democratic	Brad Hoylman	87,509	
Working Families	Brad Hoylman	6,061	
Total	Brad Hoylman	93,570	99.8
Write-in		206	0.2
Total votes		93,776	100.0
Democratic hold			

=== Federal results in District 27 ===
Year	Office	Results
2020	President	Biden 87.2 – 11.2%
2016	President	Clinton 86.7 – 10.0%
2012	President	Obama 82.5 – 15.9%
2012	Senate	Gillibrand 86.0 – 12.2%
