= New York City Council LGBTQIA+ Caucus =

Caucus within the New York City Council

- Ideology: LGBTQ+ rights
- Seats on the Council: 7 / 51
- Seats in the Council Democratic Caucus: 6 / 46
- Seats in the Council Republican Caucus: 1 / 5

The New York City Council LGBTQIA+ Caucus, formerly the LGBT Caucus, is a caucus of LGBTQ+ members of the New York City Council. The Caucus's stated purpose as of 2026 is to "establish legislative and budget priorities and the creation of community initiatives, rooted in the tradition of Black Queer feminism, to dismantle systems of oppression, and promote the culture, contribution, and interests of the LGBTQIA+ community in New York City." The Caucus has grown from membership of as low as two members in 2005 to seven as of 2017. Former speakers Corey Johnson and Christine Quinn were members of the caucus. David Carr became the first gay Republican elected to the council in 2021.

== Current members ==
Membership as of 2026 includes the following members:

District	Name	Borough	Party	Years in Council	Notes
3	Carl Wilson	Manhattan	Dem	2026–present	
17	Justin Sanchez	Bronx	Dem	2026–present	Co-chair
29	Lynn Schulman	Queens	Dem	2022–present	
35	Crystal Hudson	Brooklyn	Dem	2022–present	
36	Chi Ossé	Brooklyn	Dem	2022–present	Co-chair
22	Tiffany Cabán	Queens	Dem	2021–present	
50	David Carr	Staten Island	Rep	2021–present	Council Minority Leader (2025, 2026–present)

== Former members ==
District	Name	Borough	Party	Years in Council	Notes
3	Erik Bottcher	Manhattan	Dem	2022–2026	
9	Kristin Richardson Jordan	Manhattan	Dem	2022–2023	
3	Corey Johnson	Manhattan	Dem	2014–2021	Council Speaker (2018–2022)
38	Carlos Menchaca	Brooklyn	Dem	2014–2021	
15	Ritchie Torres	Bronx	Dem	2014–2020	
25	Daniel Dromm	Queens	Dem	2010–2021	
26	Jimmy Van Bramer	Queens	Dem	2010–2021	Council Majority Leader (2014–2017)
13	James Vacca	Bronx	Dem	2006–2017	
2	Rosie Méndez	Manhattan	Dem	2002–2017	
3	Christine Quinn	Manhattan	Dem	1999–2013	Council Speaker (2006–2013)
2	Margarita López	Manhattan	Dem	1998–2006	
8	Phil Reed	Manhattan	Dem	1998–2005	
2	Antonio Pagán	Manhattan	Dem	1992–1998	
3	Thomas Duane	Manhattan	Dem	1992–1998	

== Activities ==
In the 2010 legislative session, the LGBT Caucus was responsible for introducing a resolution seeking U.S. Congress to repeal its "Don't ask, don't tell" policy on gays in the military.

In 2016, Daniel Dromm, a former public school teacher and member of the Caucus, led the effort in funding the first LGBT liaison within the NYC Department of Education Office of Safety and Youth Development, with the goal of fighting LGBT intolerance and seeking ways to be inclusive to LGBT communities.

The Caucus rebuked Mayor Eric Adams appointment of several anti-LGBTQ individuals to the Mayor's Office.
