= New York's 47th State Senate district =

American legislative district

Senator
Erik Bottcher; D–Chelsea
- Registration: 71.5% Democratic; 7.1% Republican; 21.4% No party preference
- Demographics: 66.7% White; 5.3% Black; 14.3% Hispanic; 12.1% Asian; 0.2% Native American
- Population (2023) • Voting age: 304,322; 231,956
- Registered voters: 229,890

New York's 47th State Senate district is one of 63 districts in the New York State Senate. The seat has been represented by Erik Bottcher since 2026, succeeding fellow Democrat Brad Hoylman-Sigal.

== Geography ==
District 47 is located in Manhattan, covering part of the west side of the borough. It encompasses most of the Upper West Side, Chelsea, and Hell's Kitchen and portions of West Village.

The district overlaps with New York's 10th and 12th congressional districts, the 66th, 67th, 69th and 75th districts of the New York State Assembly, and the 3rd, 6th and 7th districts of the New York City Council.

=== 2010s ===
District 47 was located in north-central New York, covering all of Lewis County and parts of St. Lawrence and Oneida counties. The district included the cities of Rome and Utica.

The district overlapped with New York's 21st and 22nd congressional districts, and with the 101st, 115th, 116th, 117th, 118th, 119th, and 121st districts of the New York State Assembly.

== Recent election results ==
=== 2026 general ===
2026 New York State Senate election, District 47
Party	Candidate	Votes	%
Democratic	Erik Bottcher		
Working Families	Erik Bottcher		
Total	Erik Bottcher (incumbent)		
Republican	Charlotte Friedman		
Write-in			
Total votes			100.0

=== 2026 special ===
Incumbent Brad Hoylman-Sigal resigned his seat on December 31, 2025 to serve as borough president of Manhattan, triggering a special election. In special elections for state legislative offices, primaries are usually not held – county committee members for each party select nominees.

2026 New York State Senate special election, District 47
Party	Candidate	Votes	%
Democratic	Erik Bottcher	11,076	
Working Families	Erik Bottcher	2,249	
Total	Erik Bottcher	13,325	91.7
Republican	Charlotte Friedman	1,117	7.7
Write-in		96	0.6
Total votes		14,538	100.0
Democratic hold			

=== 2024 ===
2024 New York State Senate election, District 47
Party	Candidate	Votes	%
Democratic	Brad Hoylman-Sigal	103,859	
Working Families	Brad Hoylman-Sigal	8,852	
Total	Brad Hoylman-Sigal (incumbent)	112,711	83.8
Republican	Emily Yuexin Miller	21,537	16.0
Write-in		278	0.2
Total votes		134,526	100.0
Democratic hold			

=== 2022 (redistricting) ===
2022 New York State Senate election, District 47
Primary election
Party	Candidate	Votes	%
Democratic	Brad Hoylman-Sigal	30,158	72.8
Democratic	Maria Danzilo	11,089	26.8
Write-in		196	0.4
Total votes		41,443	100.0
General election
Democratic	Brad Hoylman-Sigal	81,710	
Working Families	Brad Hoylman-Sigal	9,001	
Total	Brad Hoylman-Sigal	90,711	93.0
Parent Party	Maria Danzilo	4,937	5.1
Medical Freedom	Robert Bobrick	1,536	1.6
Write-in		343	0.3
Total votes		97,527	100.0
Democratic win (new boundaries)			

=== 2020 ===
2020 New York State Senate election, District 47
Party	Candidate	Votes	%
Republican	Joseph Griffo	80,723	
Conservative	Joseph Griffo	10,126	
Independence	Joseph Griffo	9,891	
Total	Joseph Griffo (incumbent)	100,740	99.6
Write-in		439	0.4
Total votes		101,179	100.0
Republican hold			

=== 2018 ===
2018 New York State Senate election, District 47
Party	Candidate	Votes	%
Republican	Joseph Griffo	59,879	
Independence	Joseph Griffo	7,063	
Conservative	Joseph Griffo	6,736	
Reform	Joseph Griffo	874	
Total	Joseph Griffo (incumbent)	74,552	99.5
Write-in		407	0.5
Total votes		74,959	100.0
Republican hold			

=== 2016 ===
2016 New York State Senate election, District 47
Party	Candidate	Votes	%
Republican	Joseph Griffo	68,324	
Independence	Joseph Griffo	8,939	
Conservative	Joseph Griffo	8,601	
Reform	Joseph Griffo	1,390	
Total	Joseph Griffo (incumbent)	87,254	99.7
Write-in		299	0.3
Total votes		87,553	100.0
Republican hold			

=== 2014 ===
2014 New York State Senate election, District 47
Party	Candidate	Votes	%
Republican	Joseph Griffo	40,620	
Independence	Joseph Griffo	6,550	
Conservative	Joseph Griffo	5,294	
Total	Joseph Griffo (incumbent)	52,464	99.5
Write-in		270	0.5
Total votes		52,734	100.0
Republican hold			

=== 2012 ===
2012 New York State Senate election, District 47
Party	Candidate	Votes	%
Republican	Joseph Griffo	62,864	
Independence	Joseph Griffo	11,134	
Conservative	Joseph Griffo	7,431	
Total	Joseph Griffo (incumbent)	81,429	99.4
Write-in		456	0.6
Total votes		81,885	100.0
Republican hold			

=== Federal results in District 47 ===
Year	Office	Results
2020	President	Trump 57.5 – 40.3%
2016	President	Trump 57.1 – 37.3%
2012	President	Romney 49.8 – 48.6%
2012	Senate	Gillibrand 63.3 – 34.6%
