= Ellen Shine =

Survivor of the RMS Titanic (d. 1993)

Ellen "Nellie" Shine (30 December 1891 – 5 March 1993) was the last living survivor of the RMS Titanic who was an adult at the time of the sinking. She was also the last living survivor of Irish background.

== Early life ==
Ellen "Nellie" Shine had been living in rural Ireland, near Newmarket, County Cork with her elder sister after their parents died. After her sister took in an orphaned infant, Shine was sent to the United States to live with her brother.

== RMS Titanic ==
Shine boarded the RMS Titanic at Queenstown as a third-class passenger to cross to the United States in order to live with her brother. There is confusion about Shine's age when she boarded the Titanic; some sources say she was 20 years of age, but in a 1959 article, her husband John Callaghan said she had been 19. In the manifest of passengers boarding in Queenstown, she is listed as a third class passenger with the occupation of "spinster".

Before Shine boarded the ship, a local school teacher gave her a religious medal, following a local custom where the saint featured was prayed to for protection during the journey, and returned to the giver. During the sinking, the medal was lost, causing Shine to become upset, as she felt the prayers and the medal was what had saved her.

Her account, shown below, of the sinking was published in The Times (of London), The Denver Post, The Daily Times and other United States newspapers. The account slightly differs in some papers, with some continuing that the four men in the life boat were shot by officers, and their bodies thrown overboard.

"Those who were able to get out of bed, rushed to the upper deck where they were met by members of the crew who endeavored to keep them in the steerage quarters. The women, however, rushed past the men and finally reached the upper deck. When they were informed that the boat was sinking, most of them fell on their knees and began to pray. I saw one of the lifeboats and made for it. In it, there were already four men from the steerage who refused to obey an officer who ordered them out. They were however finally turned out."

— Ellen Shine, The Times, 20 April 1912

== Later life ==
Shine married John Callaghan and moved to northern Manhattan, New York City, where she lived until her death in 1993, aged 101. She was the maternal grandmother of Christine Quinn, former Speaker of the New York City Council. Quinn later recounted that while speaking to a priest about her grandmother's survival, she said, "I guess my grandmother knew there was a time for praying and a time for running". The priest responded, "No, Christine, your grandmother knew you could pray while running".
