= Christine Quinn =

American politician (born 1966)

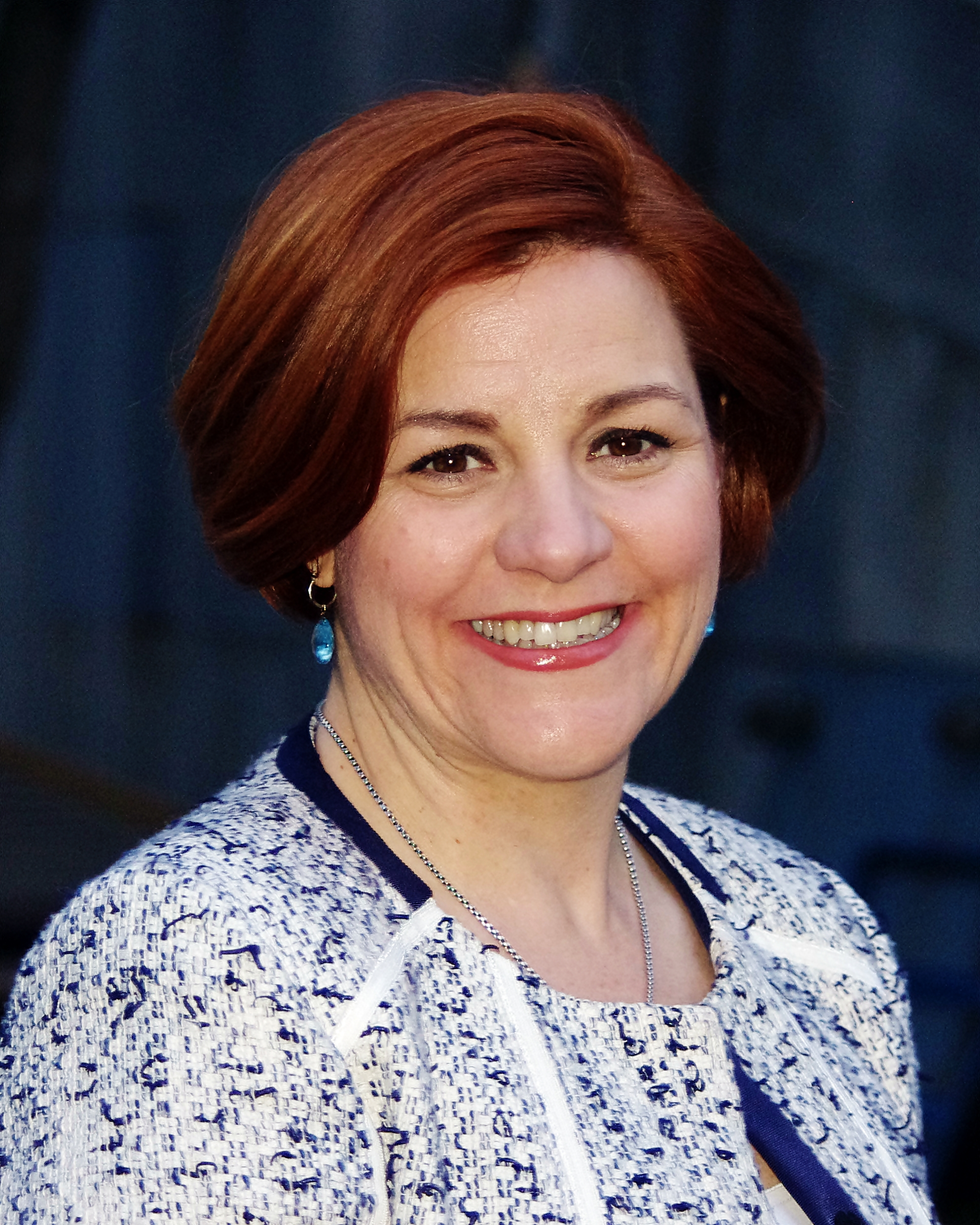
- Quinn in 2012

Speaker of the New York City Council
- In office January 1, 2006 – December 31, 2013
- Preceded by: Gifford Miller
- Succeeded by: Melissa Mark-Viverito

Member of the New York City Council from the 3rd district
- In office November 2, 1999 – December 31, 2013
- Preceded by: Thomas K. Duane
- Succeeded by: Corey Johnson

Personal details
- Born: Christine Callaghan Quinn; July 25, 1966 (age 60) Glen Cove, New York, U.S.
- Party: Democratic
- Other political affiliations: Women's Equality
- Spouse: Kim Catullo (m. 2012)
- Relations: Ellen Shine (grandmother)
- Education: Trinity College, Connecticut (BA)
- Website: Campaign website

Christine Callaghan Quinn (born July 25, 1966) is an American politician. A member of the Democratic Party, she is a former member and speaker of the New York City Council. Quinn is the third person and first woman to serve as speaker of the New York City Council. She ran to succeed Michael Bloomberg as the city's mayor in the 2013 mayoral election, but finished third in the Democratic primary. Quinn is a political contributor on CNN and MSNBC.

== Early life, education, and early political career ==
Quinn was born in Glen Cove, New York, one of two daughters of Mary (née Callaghan) and Lawrence Quinn. Her mother died of breast cancer in 1982. She attended School of the Holy Child in the village of Old Westbury on Long Island in New York, and graduated from Trinity College in Hartford, Connecticut in 1988. Her maternal grandmother, Ellen (née Shine) Callaghan, was a survivor of the sinking of the RMS Titanic.

She served as head of the Housing Justice Campaign for the Association of Neighborhood and Housing Development. Quinn entered politics to manage the City Council campaign of Thomas Duane in 1991, after which she served as Duane's chief of staff for five years. She later became the executive director of the New York City Anti-Violence Project, and was appointed a member of the NYC Police/Community Relations Task Force by then-Mayor Rudy Giuliani.

== New York City Council ==
In a 1999 special election, Quinn ran for New York City Council in the 3rd district. The 3rd district covers the Manhattan neighborhoods of Chelsea, Greenwich Village, and Hell's Kitchen, as well as parts of West Village, SoHo and Murray Hill. Quinn became the Democratic nominee and defeated Republican Joseph Mauriello, 89%-11%.

In 2001 Quinn won a full term on the City Council, defeating Republican Michelle Bouchard 75%-25%. Because the district lines were redrawn after the 2000 census, her term lasted only two years. She was reelected in 2003 after the districts were redrawn according to population shifts (all council districts must have an equal number of residents). In 2005 she was reelected to a four-year term unopposed. In 2009 she was reelected to a third term with 81% of the vote.

=== Pre-speakership ===
While on the City Council, Quinn served as Chair of the Health Committee. She sponsored the Equal Benefits Bill and the Health Care Security Act, which requires that city contractors provide parity in benefits between married spouses and registered domestic partners. This bill (along with the Health Care Security Act, which ensures health care for grocery workers) passed over Mayor Michael Bloomberg's veto. Quinn also "shepherded" a ban on indoor smoking at commercial establishments through the City Council; the bill passed 42–7.

=== Speaker of the New York City Council ===
Quinn was elected Speaker of the New York City Council in January 2006 and reelected in 2010. She was the first female, the first single person (later married) elected on the city council, and first openly gay person to hold this position.

==== Ahmadinejad visit ====
Preceding the controversial lecture by Iranian President Mahmoud Ahmadinejad at Columbia University in 2007, Quinn wrote to the school requesting that his invitation to speak be withdrawn due to his support of state-sponsored terrorism and hate speech, the latter particularly with regard to the Holocaust. Her request was denied.

==== Controversy regarding Council funds ====
Under New York City law, the City Council Speaker has authority over the yearly City Council funds, worth almost $400 million (in 2012), to distribute among 51 members. This discretionary funding system, sometimes called the "slush fund", has been criticized, with some councilmembers alleging Quinn to have cut funding to their districts as a form of political retaliation. She repeatedly denied these allegations.

In April 2008 the New York Post reported that Quinn's office had appropriated millions of dollars to organizations that did not exist, and that the money was then secretly routed to organizations favored by individual councilmembers. In a news conference that followed Quinn said, "I had no knowledge of it; I did not know this was the practice". She said she had found out about it only a few months earlier, alerted authorities, and ordered staffers to stop the practice, but that they did not listen. Quinn hired a criminal defense lawyer to represent her in the federal and city investigations. Records showed that nearly 25% of those "secret slush" funds went to organizations in Quinn's district and that two of the biggest recipients had contributed to Quinn's 2009 mayoral run. In September 2011 one of the city council's lawyers reported that the federal "investigation has been closed without taking up any action," but only after two councilmen were indicted at the cost of $100,000 to the city.

==== Food stamps ====
Under Quinn's leadership, the New York City Council led efforts to make Greenmarkets accept food stamps. She also opposed requiring applicants for food stamps to be electronically fingerprinted. New York State stopped fingerprinting food-stamp recipients in 2007, but the practice continued in New York City under the Bloomberg administration.

==== Humanitarian efforts ====
On December 26, 2012, Quinn wrote a letter to President Obama formally requesting that he commute Jonathan Pollard's lifetime sentence for providing classified information to Israel. She wrote, "I know I share similar views with many past and current American elected officials," and asked Obama to "use [his] constitutional power to treat Mr. Pollard the way others have been treated by our nation's justice system."

==== LGBT issues ====
Quinn was a vigorous LGBT advocate during her tenure on the City Council. In 2006 she boycotted the annual St. Patrick's Day Parade in New York due to the policy of the parade's sponsor, the Ancient Order of Hibernians, against gays marching openly. The same year she tried unsuccessfully to broker a deal with the organizers to allow her to wear a gay pride pin. Subsequently, she was named 2008 Irish-American of the Year by the New York-based Irish Echo and has boycotted the parade every year since, marching instead in St. Patrick's Day parades in other cities around the world.

In November 2009 Quinn urged the New York Senate to pass same-sex marriage legislation, saying that "she and her partner, lawyer Kim Catullo, [would] not get married until they [could do so] in New York. Near tears, she added: 'This is literally a moment when people can stand up and say that everybody's family matters, that everybody's home is a blessed place and that everybody has the same rights.'"

On July 28, 2012, Quinn sent a letter demanding that the president of NYU end its relationship with Chick-Fil-A, because of the stance of the company's CEO, Dan Cathy, against same-sex marriage.

==== Term limits ====
According to New York, "[for] years, Quinn opposed term limits, a position that helped her get elected speaker by fellow Council members in 2005. Once in the job, though, she commissioned a poll, and it showed that the public opposed tinkering with them. In December 2007, Quinn declared that repealing term limits would be 'anti-democratic,' a position she called 'firm and final.'" But in 2008 Quinn backed Mayor Michael Bloomberg's effort to overturn the two-term limit for New York City elected officials, saying she had changed her position due to concern about the impact a change in leadership could have on the city's economic recovery. In 2008 the Council voted to extend term limits to allow the mayor, City Council members, and borough presidents to run for third terms, reversing the results of the two previous public referendums. Bloomberg was subsequently elected to a third term as mayor, and Quinn to a third term on the City Council.

Public Advocate Betsy Gotbaum, among others, denounced this move. In June 2009 the City Council approved a 40% cut in the budget of the Public Advocate's Office. Gotbaum declared herself a victim of "political payback" because of her opposition to the changes in the term limits law, a notion Quinn claimed was "ridiculous". All five candidates for Public Advocate showed up at City Hall in June to protest the move, and in 2010 New Yorkers again voted overwhelmingly to limit politicians to two consecutive terms.

== 2013 mayoral election ==
On March 10, 2013, after much speculation, Quinn announced that she was running for mayor of New York City. Michael Bloomberg, the incumbent, was term-limited and could not run again.

Widely viewed as Bloomberg's heir apparent, Quinn was considered the early frontrunner in the nine-candidate race for the Democratic nomination. During her mayoral campaign, multiple media outlets reported on Quinn's temper; The New York Times reported that her staff had her City Council office soundproofed due to her outbursts. Quinn's rivals attacked her for reversing her position on mayoral term limits and supporting Bloomberg's bid for a third term in 2009. In August 2013 The Washington Post opined that Quinn's primary chances were damaged by Bloomberg's "tacit endorsement" of her campaign, and in September The New York Times asserted that her change in position on term limits had also harmed her chances.

Quinn's campaign faded as time went on, and she finished third in the primary. She received 15.5% of the vote, while winner Bill de Blasio received 40.3% and Bill Thompson 26.2%.

== Post-council activities ==
In 2013 Quinn's memoir, With Patience and Fortitude – A Memoir, was published by William Morrow. It sold poorly, with The New York Times reporting only 100 copies sold its first week.

In October 2014 Quinn stumped for the Women's Equality Party established by New York Governor Andrew Cuomo in July 2014. When asked about the Working Families Party's criticism of the creation of a competing progressive party, she said, "Change is hard." In January 2015 Cuomo hired Quinn as a special advisor.

In 2015, Quinn became president and CEO of Women in Need (WIN), a nonprofit organization that is one of New York City's largest providers of services to homeless women and children. Her annual salary is $350,000. Since Quinn's first job was as a housing organizer for poor and homeless people, she noted that she had come full circle with her new job. Quinn said she was hoping to continue the good work of WIN's previous longtime leader, Bonnie Stone, and use a holistic approach to help women facing domestic violence, eviction, and other issues. Before accepting the position at WIN, Quinn fought against a homeless shelter planned for her own neighborhood of Chelsea.

Quinn made headlines in 2018 for her comments about Cynthia Nixon's campaign for the Democratic gubernatorial nomination. Referring to her own 2013 mayoral candidacy, Quinn said, "Cynthia Nixon was opposed to having a qualified lesbian become mayor of New York City", and added, "Now she wants to be an unqualified lesbian to be the governor of New York. [Being] an actress and celebrity doesn’t make you qualified for public office".

In 2019, Quinn and WIN drew criticism from the press (including a masthead editorial in The New York Daily News) for two contracts to operate homeless shelters in South Park Slope, Brooklyn. The allegations, verified by multiple journalists, included that the contracts contained up to $89 million of unexplained and apparently inflated costs. WIN and Quinn repeatedly declined to comment when asked for an explanation of the cost. One of the shelters opened in 2020.

Though Quinn was designated an elector in the 2020 presidential election, Manhattan Borough President Gale Brewer served as her alternate.

On June 22, 2026, Quinn appeared at The Lesbian, Gay, Bisexual, and Transgender Community Center of New York to denounce the 2026 Republican nominee for Governor of New York Bruce Blakeman for his close ties with Andy Ogles, Randy Fine, and other members of the Make America Great Again movement and others with anti-LGBTQ+ stances. Deborah Glick, Ritchie Torres, The President of the Stonewall Democratic Club of New York John Wahlmeier, and Carl M. Wilson also spoke at this conference.

== Personal life ==
Quinn resides in Chelsea, Manhattan, with her wife, Kim Catullo, a lawyer. They married on May 19, 2012,(when Quinn was the New York City Council Speaker) and spend their summer weekends at a home they bought in 2004 in Bradley Beach, New Jersey. Her former partner, Laura Morrison, was chief of staff to former State Senator Thomas Duane.

Quinn joined the board of Athlete Ally, an organization fighting homophobia in sports, in February 2014. She is Catholic.

== See also ==
- LGBT culture in New York City
- List of LGBT people from New York City
- NYC Pride March

Political offices
Preceded by Thomas Duane	Member from 3rd district 1999–2013	Succeeded by Corey Johnson
Preceded by Gifford Miller	Speaker; 2006–2013	Succeeded by Melissa Mark-Viverito
