= Erik Bottcher =

American politician (born 1979)

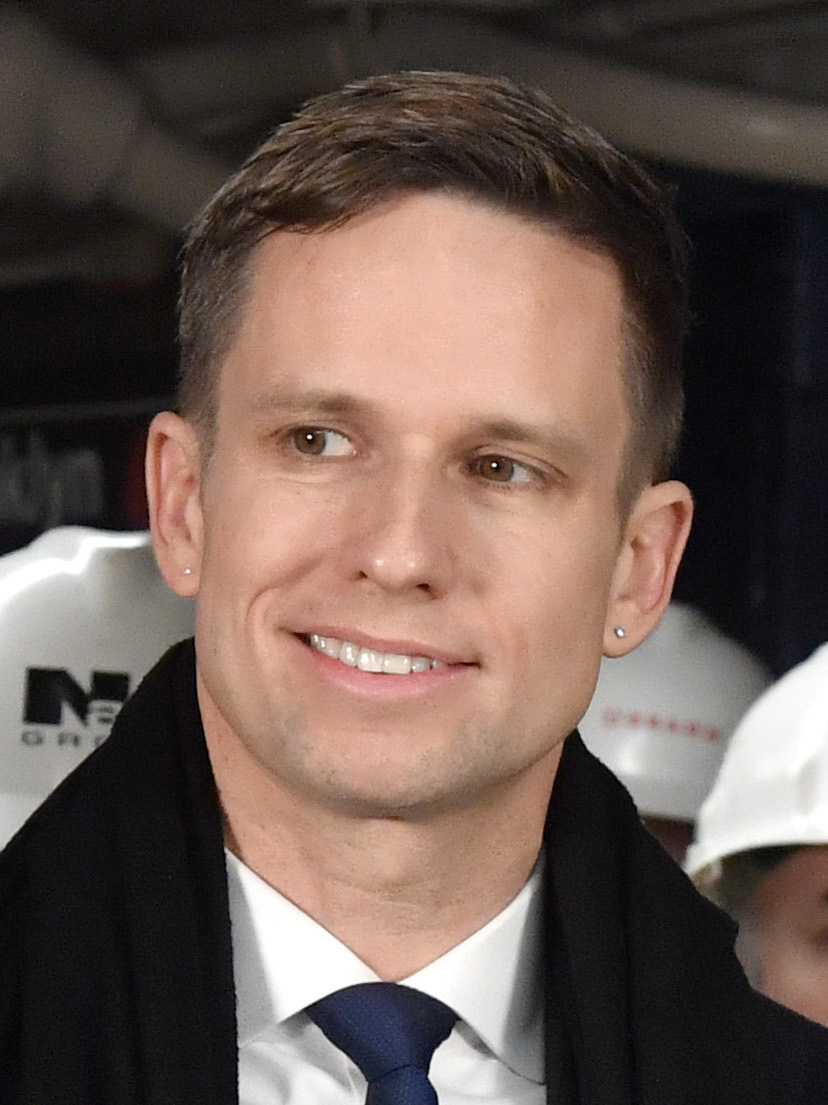
- Bottcher in 2024

Member of the New York Senate from the 47th district
- Incumbent
- Assumed office February 4, 2026
- Preceded by: Brad Hoylman-Sigal

Member of the New York City Council from the 3rd district
- In office January 1, 2022 – February 4, 2026
- Preceded by: Corey Johnson
- Succeeded by: Carl Wilson

Personal details
- Born: May 9, 1979 (age 47)
- Party: Democratic
- Education: George Washington University (BA)
- Website: City Council website Campaign website

Erik Bottcher (born May 9, 1979) is an American politician representing New York City. He has been a Democratic member of the New York State Senate since 2026, having previously served the 3rd district of the New York City Council from 2022-2026, which includes the neighborhoods of Greenwich Village, Chelsea, and Hell's Kitchen.

In late December 2025, he announced he was going to run for the state senate seat held by Brad Hoylman-Sigal who was elected to be the Manhattan Borough President. Bottcher abandoned his earlier plans to run to replace retiring Congressman Jerry Nadler in New York's 12th congressional district.

== Early life and education ==
Bottcher was raised in Wilmington, New York, a small town in the Adirondack Mountains located outside of Lake Placid. His parents, Jerry and Linda, owned and operated a fly fishing motel called "The Hungry Trout".

As an adolescent, Bottcher suffered from depression and struggled to come to terms with his sexual orientation. At the age of 15 and following several suicide attempts, he was admitted to Four Winds Hospital, a mental health facility in Saratoga Springs, New York.

After graduating from Lake Placid High School, Bottcher wrote an open letter to the school board sharing his experiences with bullying he endured at the school and why the district needed to do more to protect its students. Shortly thereafter, the school district added "sexual orientation" to its non-discrimination policy. Bottcher often credits these early experiences as the beginning of his political activism.

He received his Bachelor of Arts degree from George Washington University.

== Career ==
After college, Bottcher moved to Manhattan and held several jobs in various industries throughout his 20s, including a traffic coordinator at an advertising firm, a production assistant in the packaging design department of Colgate Palmolive, and as a realtor at the Corcoran Group.

Bottcher began his formal politics work in 2009, when he joined the staff of the New York City Council as the body's LGBT and HIV/AIDS community liaison. At the Council, he worked on issues including hate crimes, transgender rights, bullying in schools, and the fight for marriage equality in New York State.

Bottcher soon joined the governor's office as the LGBTQ liaison. In that role, he assisted the successful 2011 effort to pass marriage equality in New York. In 2015, Bottcher re-entered city politics as chief of staff to Council member (and soon-to-be City Council Speaker) Corey Johnson, where he remained until his own City Council campaign.

=== 2021 City Council campaign ===
In February 2020, Bottcher announced he would run to succeed the term-limited Johnson for the 3rd district of the City Council in 2021. Running with Johnson's support, Bottcher quickly became the district's frontrunner, raising more money than all but four other candidates across the city and accruing endorsements from nearly every major union and local elected official.

During the campaign, Bottcher released an extensive policy platform aimed at addressing the crisis of serious mental illness, New York City's sanitation concerns, and increasing employment opportunities for residents of public housing and those living in poverty.

On election night on June 22, Bottcher resoundingly led the field with 47 percent of first-choice votes, and declared victory that night; when absentee ballots and ranked-choice votes were counted two weeks later, Bottcher officially defeated runner-up Arthur Schwartz 71-29%. He faced no opposition in the November general election.

=== Residence protest ===
On December 17, 2023, Bottcher attended a Drag Story Hour event that was targeted by about 20 anti-LGBT protestors. On December 19, two protesters were arrested for entering Bottcher's building and refusing to leave, but eventually did so. The protestors also defaced the sidewalk outside of his apartment with graffiti calling him a pedophile and using slurs such as "OK Groomer" and "Child Predator". The group also entered and vandalized his nearby office building.

=== 2026 congressional and state senate elections ===
Bottcher announced his candidacy for Jerrold Nadler's open congressional seat in November 2025 and raised over a million dollars. The following month, he withdrew from the U.S. House race and announced his candidacy in the 47th NY Senate seat, which was having a special election in February. Bottcher won the special election and assumed office on February 4, 2026.

== Personal life ==
Bottcher lives in Chelsea. He is gay and has been open about his struggles with suicide when he was a closeted high schooler.

== Electoral history ==
=== 2026 ===
2026 New York State Senate special election, District 47
Party	Candidate	Votes	%
Democratic	Erik Bottcher	11,076	76.2
Working Families	Erik Bottcher	2,249	15.5
Total	Erik Bottcher	13,325	91.7
Republican	Charlotte Friedman	1,117	7.7
Write-in		96	0.7
Total votes		14,538	100.0
Democratic hold			

=== 2025 ===
2025 New York City Council Democratic primary, District 3
Party	Candidate	Votes	%
Democratic	Erik Bottcher (incumbent)	21,871	74.0
Democratic	Jacqueline Lara	7,486	25.3
Write-in		194	0.7
Total votes		29,551	100.0

2025 New York City Council election, District 3
Party	Candidate	Votes	%
Democratic	Erik Bottcher (incumbent)	47,354	89.8
A Blue Collar/Fight and Deliver	Dominick Romeo	4,955	9.4
Write-in		407	0.8
Total votes		52,716	100.0
Democratic hold			

=== 2023 ===
2023 New York City Council election, District 3
Party	Candidate	Votes	%
Democratic	Erik Bottcher (incumbent)	14,167	89.1
Republican	Robert P. Bobrick	1,469	9.2
Medical Freedom	Robert P. Bobrick	179	1.1
Total	Robert P. Bobrick	1,648	10.4
Write-in		88	0.6
Total votes		15,903	100.0
Democratic hold			

=== 2021 ===
2021 New York City Council Democratic primary, District 3
Party	Candidate	Maximum round	Maximum votes	Share in maximum round	Maximum votes First round votes Transfer votes
Democratic	Erik Bottcher	7	17,027	71.4%	
Democratic	Arthur Z. Schwartz	7	6,806	28.6%	
Democratic	Leslie Boghosian Murphy	6	5,669	21.6%	
Democratic	Aleta A. LaFargue	5	3,439	12.6%	
Democratic	Marni Halasa	3	2,442	8.7%	
Democratic	Phelan D. Fitzpatrick	2	1,597	5.6%	
Write-In		1	125	0.4%	

2021 New York City Council election, District 3
Party	Candidate	Votes	%
Democratic	Erik Bottcher	27,347	98.5
Write-in		418	1.5
Total votes		27,765	100.0
Democratic hold			

== See also ==
- LGBT culture in New York City
- List of LGBT people from New York City
