= Brad Hoylman-Sigal =

American politician (born 1965)

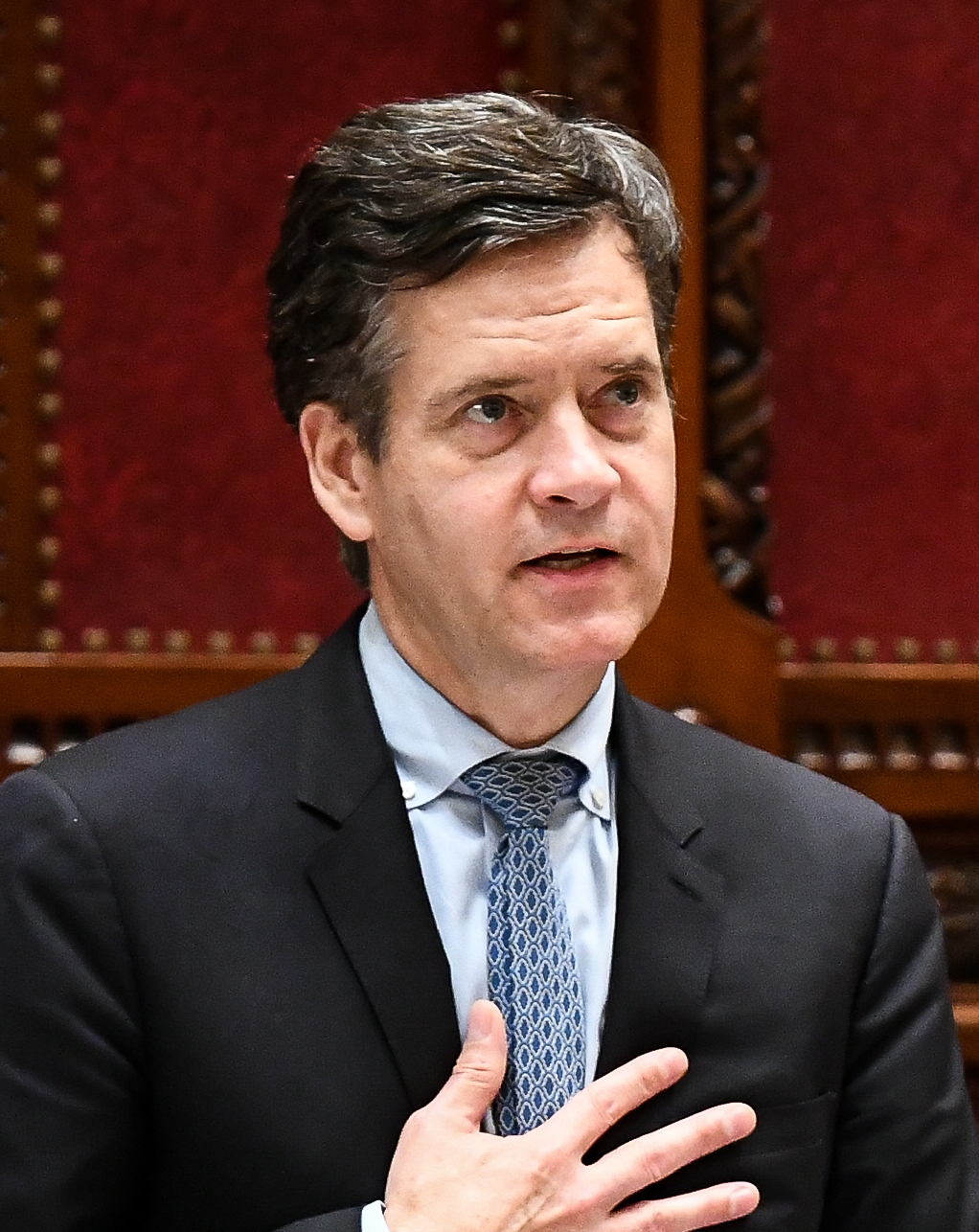
- Hoylman-Sigal in 2019

29th Borough President of Manhattan
- Incumbent
- Assumed office January 1, 2026
- Preceded by: Mark Levine

Member of the New York State Senate
- In office January 1, 2013 – December 31, 2025
- Preceded by: Thomas Duane
- Succeeded by: Erik Bottcher
- Constituency: 27th district (2013–2022); 47th district (2023–2025)

Personal details
- Born: Brad Madison Hoylman; October 27, 1965 (age 61) Phoenix, Arizona, U.S.
- Party: Democratic
- Spouse: David Sigal (m. 2013)
- Children: 2
- Education: West Virginia University (BA); Exeter College, Oxford (MPhil); Harvard University (JD)
- Website: State Senate website Campaign website

Brad Madison Hoylman-Sigal (born October 27, 1965) is an American politician who has served as Manhattan borough president since January 1, 2026. A member of the Democratic Party, Hoylman-Sigal was previously a member of the New York State Senate, representing the 27th district from 2013 to 2022 and the 47th district from 2023 to 2025. During his tenure in the state legislature, he was chairman of the Senate Judiciary Committee.

== Early life and education ==
Hoylman-Sigal was born in Phoenix, Arizona, on October 27, 1965. He grew up in rural Lewisburg, West Virginia, the youngest of six children to Audrey Kennedy Hoylman, a public elementary school teacher, and James M. Hoylman, a process systems analytics analyst. He is a former Eagle Scout in Troop 70, Lewisburg, West Virginia. He attended Greenbrier East High School in West Virginia.

He attended West Virginia University (WVU; BA in political science and English literature, 1989), where Hoylman-Sigal was elected president of student administration and graduated summa cum laude with honors. At WVU he was a member of Phi Beta Kappa, and received a Truman Scholarship and a Marshall Scholarship.

Hoylman-Sigal then attended Oxford University (Exeter College) on a Rhodes Scholarship. He received a master's degree in political science (M.Phil., 1992).

Afterward, he attended Harvard Law School. He graduated with a JD in 1996.

== Early career ==
Hoylman-Sigal was an associate at law firm Paul, Weiss, Rifkind, Wharton & Garrison from 1996 to 1998. He was an associate at Frankfurt, Garbus, Klein & Selz from 1998 to 2000.

From 2000 to 2012, Hoylman-Sigal served as executive vice president and general counsel of the Partnership for New York City, which represents New York City's business leadership and its largest private-sector employers. In 2001, when future New York State Assemblyman Micah Lasher was 19 years old, he managed Hoylman-Sigal's campaign for New York City Council.

Hoylman-Sigal was also the chairperson of Community Board 2 in Manhattan, and the Democratic District Leader of the New York 66th Assembly District, Part A. He is also Trustee of the Community Service Society of New York, a former president of the Gay and Lesbian Independent Democrats, and a former board member of the Empire State Pride Agenda, Tenants & Neighbors, Class Size Matters, and Citizen Action.

In 2001, Hoylman-Sigal ran for the New York City Council in the first district, which includes Governor's Island and a portion of Lower Manhattan. He placed second in a seven-candidate race, losing to Alan Gerson.

== New York Senate ==
=== 2013–2019 ===
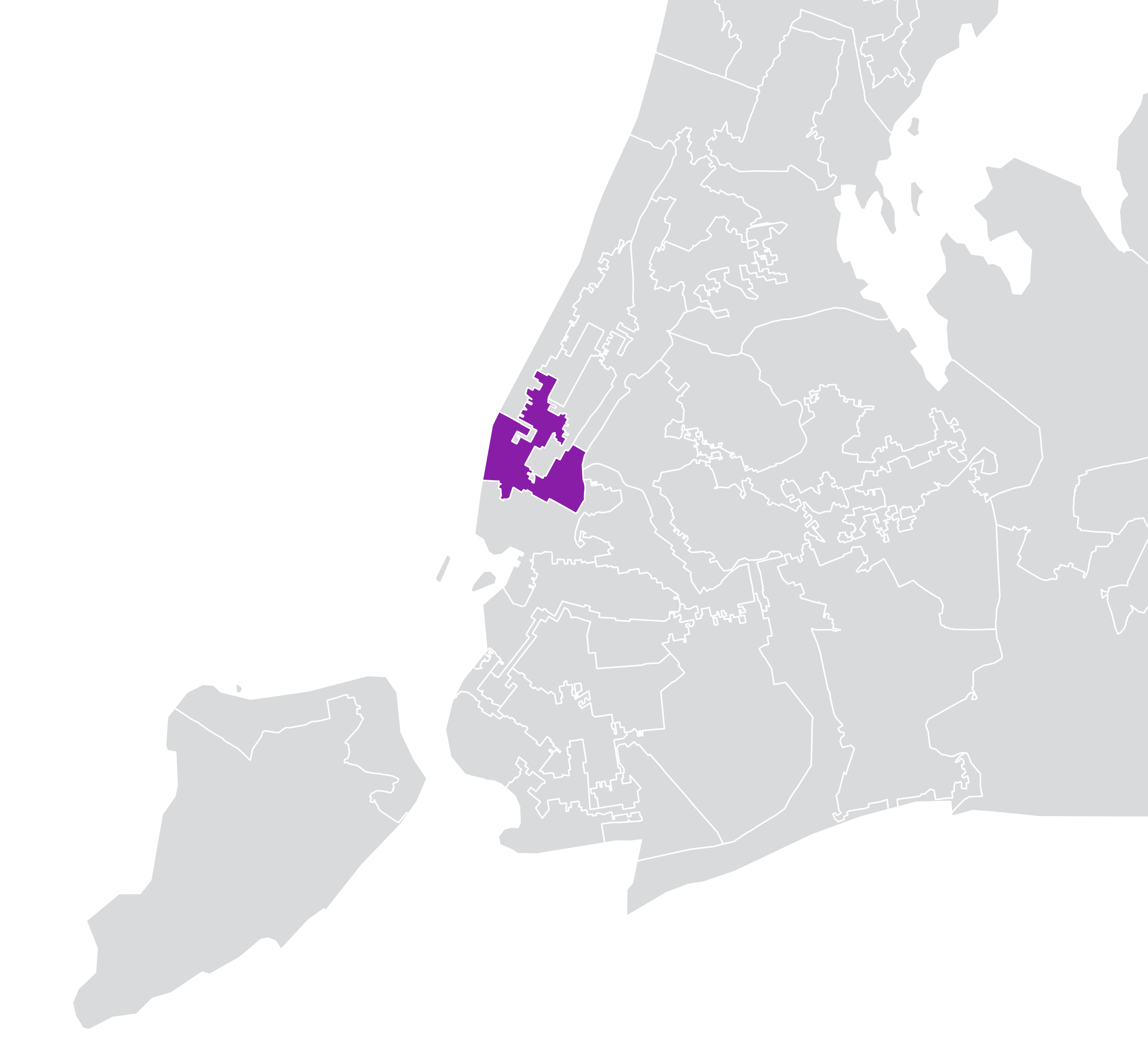
New York's 27th State Senate district before 2023

On June 11, 2012, Hoylman-Sigal declared his candidacy for the 27th District of the New York State Senate, running for the seat of retiring state senator Tom Duane. He won Duane's endorsement, as well as the support of numerous local politicians and unions. In the Democratic primary election held on September 13, 2012, he won 68% of the vote in a three-candidate field. Hell's Kitchen activist and bar owner Tom Greco was his closest competition, winning 24% of the vote. In the general election in November he was unopposed.

Hoylman-Sigal won the Democratic primary and general election (with 80% of the vote) in 2014, 2016 (with 96% of the vote), and 2018 (with 99% of the vote). In 2019, Hoylman-Sigal was the only openly gay member of the New York State Senate; he would later be joined by Jabari Brisport in 2021.

In December 2016, Hoylman-Sigal sponsored legislation known as the Tax Returns Uniformly Made Public (T.R.U.M.P.) Act, prohibiting New York State electors from voting for a presidential candidate who has not publicly released at least five years worth of tax returns no later than fifty days prior to a general election. Lawmakers in twenty-five other states followed suit in producing legislation to compel presidential candidates to release their tax returns. The idea was praised by the editorial board of The New York Times.

After the 2018 midterm elections, Hoylman-Sigal was appointed Chair of the Senate Judiciary Committee. In the majority, Hoylman-Sigal passed multiple pieces of legislation including the Child Victims Act, the Gender Expression Non-Discrimination Act (or GENDA), and a ban on so-called 'gay conversion therapy.' Hoylman-Sigal also sponsored the TRUST Act, which was passed by the state Senate. The bill would allow certain Congressional committees to perform oversight by reviewing the New York State tax returns of senior government officials; members of Congress suggested this could allow Congressional committees to review Donald Trump's tax returns. City & State, a New York-based political news organization, characterized Hoylman-Sigal as "the person behind state Senate’s progressive bills."

In 2019, the Child Victims Act that Hoylman-Sigal sponsored was adopted. It extended New York's statutes of limitations for child sexual abuse and created a one-year lookback window within which survivors would be able to initiate claims against their abusers in cases where the statute of limitations had expired, and allowed them to bring a civil lawsuit against their abuser or institutions that enabled or protected their abuser by the age of 55 (up from the age of 23). Over 9,000 lawsuits have been filed under that law, including against the Catholic Church, the Boy Scouts, and other groups that cared for children.

=== 2020–2025 ===
In March 2021, Governor Andrew Cuomo signed a bill, sponsored by Hoylman-Sigal, to repeal New York's ban on paid gestational surrogacy. Assemblywoman Amy Paulin introduced the bill in 2012. As of the bill's passage, only two other states (Louisiana and Michigan) retained laws explicitly banning paid surrogacy.

In June 2021, the New York Senate passed the Adult Survivors Act (ASA), which was sponsored by Hoylman-Sigal and Assemblymember Linda Rosenthal. The bill failed to pass the Assembly in 2021. However, Rosenthal and Hoylman-Sigal introduced the ASA again the following year. This time, the legislation was enacted: it unanimously passed the Senate in April 2022, passed the Assembly on a 140–3 vote in May 2022, and was signed into law by Governor Kathy Hochul. The bill established a one-year "lookback period" that allowed adult victims of sex abuse or sex crimes to bring civil lawsuits that were previously barred due to the statute of limitations. He is endorsed by the Working Families Party. The same month, Hoylman-Sigal was defeated in the Democratic primary election for Manhattan Borough President by Mark Levine. This was the first year that ranked-choice voting was implemented for most New York City election and primary contests.

In September, Hoylman-Sigal asked U.S. Senator Maria Cantwell, the chair of the Senate Commerce Committee, to engage in oversight of the United States Center for SafeSport, and to step in to ensure that SafeSport is adequately conducting investigations. He referred to what he called SafeSport's failure to carry out impartial and thorough investigations and ensure the safety of athletes it is charged with protecting. He highlighted serious outstanding allegations of sexual misconduct, sexual coercion, and other violent behaviors by former friends, peers, and current teammates, and an ongoing investigation, and criticized SafeSport's decision to allow fencer Alen Hadzic to Tokyo as an alternate for the 2021 U.S. Olympic fencing team.

That October, City & State ranked Hoylman-Sigal #11 on its annual list of the 100 most powerful people in Manhattan.

In December, Hoylman-Sigal proposed legislation to ban landlords convicted of criminal activity from doing business with state-chartered banks. Wells Fargo and Bank of America, Signature Bank and New York Community Bank are not state banks. Steven Croman, a landlord notorious for harassing his tenants in New York, was the inspiration for this bill. To address New York's housing crisis, Hoylman-Sigal proposed legislation to remove a number of zoning regulations in New York that he viewed as onerous. The legislation would eliminate parking requirements; prohibit localities from requiring large lot sizes for homes; and allow for the construction of up to four housing units on lots that were previously exclusively zoned for single-family housing.

In 2023, Hoylman-Sigal became the New York State Senator for the 47th district, which was redistricted from the 27th district. Hoylman-Sigal's old district included Chelsea, Midtown, and the East Village, up to north of Columbus Circle. The new and more compact 47th district excluded the East Side and covered the West Side, from Chelsea through the Upper West Side.

Hoylman-Sigal is a member of the Vote Blue Coalition, a progressive group and federal PAC created to support Democrats in New York, New Jersey, and Pennsylvania through voter outreach and mobilization efforts.

In the December 2024, Hoylman-Sigal announced he would be running for Manhattan Borough President in the Democratic primary the following June, where he prevailed with 55 percent of the vote after ranked-choice allocation.

== Personal life ==
Hoylman married David Ivan Sigal, a filmmaker, at Congregation Beit Simchat Torah in Manhattan, New York City, in February 2013. They live with their two daughters, Silvia and Lucy, in Greenwich Village. Hoylman-Sigal is Jewish, and is a member of Congregation Beit Simchat Torah.

== Electoral history ==
Election history
Office	Year	Election	Results
New York City Council	2001	Primary (Democratic)	Alan Gerson: 25.1% Brad Hoylman-Sigal: 20.0% Rocky Chin: 19.9% Margret Chin: 19.4% John Fratta: 15.6%
New York State Senate	2012	Primary (Democratic)	Brad Hoylman-Sigal: 63.5% Tommy Grecio: 23.7% Tamika Inlaw: 8.9%
New York State Senate	2014	General	Brad Hoylman-Sigal (D): 80.0% Frank Scala (R): 13.6%
New York State Senate	2016	Primary (Democratic)	Brad Hoylman-Sigal: 80% Steven Roberts: 20%
New York State Senate	2018	General	Brad Hoylman-Sigal (D) 99.2%
New York State Senate	2020	Primary (Democratic)	Brad Hoylman-Sigal 74.2% Elizabeth Glass 25.5%
New York State Senate	2020	General	Brad Hoylman-Sigal (D) 99.1%
Manhattan Borough President	2021	Primary (Democratic)	Mark Levine: 53.7% Brad Hoylman-Sigal: 46.3%
State Senate	2022	Primary (Democratic)	Brad Hoylman-Sigal: 72.7% Maria Danzilo: 26.9%
State Senate	2022	General	Brad Hoylman-Sigal (D): 93.0% Seson Adams (I): 5.1% Robert Bobrick (I): 1.6%
Manhattan Borough President	2025	Primary (Democratic)	Brad Hoylman-Sigal: 54.8% Keith Powers: 45.2%
Manhattan Borough President	2025	General	Brad Hoylman-Sigal (D): 80.7% Seson Adams (R): 17% Rolando Gomez (I): 2.1%

== See also ==
- LGBT culture in New York City
- LGBT rights in New York
- List of LGBT people from New York City
- NYC Pride March

Political offices
Preceded by Mark Levine	Borough President of Manhattan; 2026–present	Incumbent
