= Joseph Griffo =

American politician (born 1956)

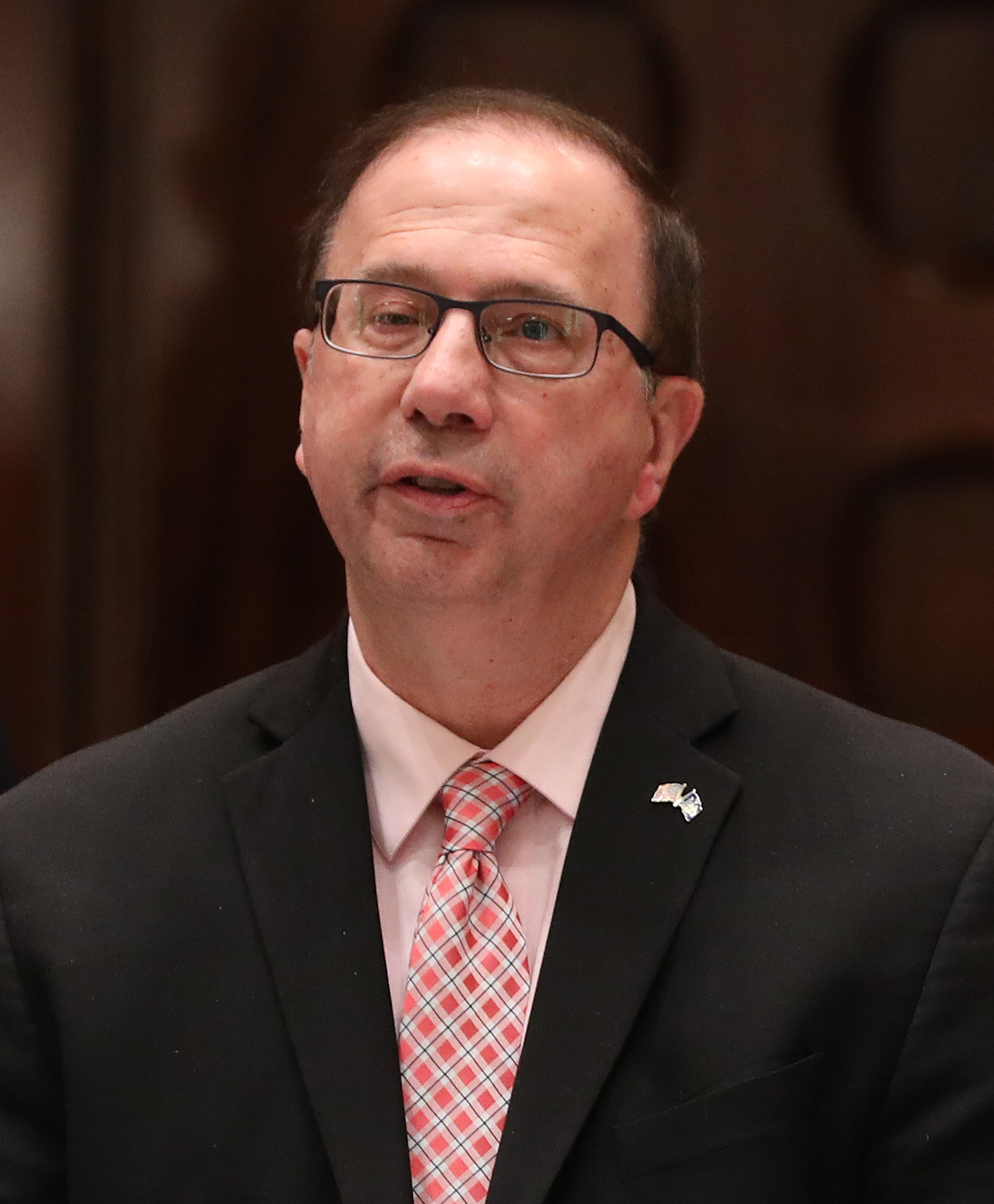

Member of the New York Senate from the 53rd district
- Incumbent
- Assumed office January 1, 2007
- Preceded by: Raymond A. Meier
- Constituency: 47th District (2007–2022); 53rd District (2023–Present)

8th Oneida County Executive
- In office 2003–2006
- Preceded by: Ralph J. Eannace, Jr.
- Succeeded by: Anthony J. Picente, Jr.

39th Mayor of Rome, New York
- In office 1992–2003
- Preceded by: Carl J. Eilenberg
- Succeeded by: John J. Mazzaferro

Personal details
- Born: January 16, 1956 (age 70) Rome, New York, U.S.
- Party: Republican
- Spouse: Lorraine Griffo
- Education: The College at Brockport, State University of New York (BA)

Joseph A. Griffo (born January 16, 1956) is an American politician serving as a member of the New York Senate from the 53rd district since 2023, and the 47th district from 2007 to 2022. The 53rd district includes all of Oneida and Madison Countiesand parts of Chenango, and Herkimer Counties. Prior to his election to the Senate, Griffo served as mayor of Rome, New York and as Oneida County executive. A Republican, Griffo serves as deputy minority leader of the State Senate.

== Early life and education ==
Joseph Griffo was born to Joseph and Betty Griffo in Rome, New York. Griffo was educated in the Rome City School District and graduated from Rome Free Academy High School in 1974. He then attended the College at Brockport, State University of New York, where he graduated with a Bachelor of Arts degree in political science in 1978.

== Career ==
=== Oneida County Legislature ===
Griffo served in the Oneida County Legislature from 1989 to 1991.

=== Mayor of Rome, New York ===
Griffo was elected mayor of his hometown of Rome, New York in 1991, and won two subsequent elections in 1995 and 1999.

As mayor, Griffo eliminated Rome's special one-quarter percent sales tax. Also, Griffo "was able to prevent a tax hike there in all but one of his years in office, despite the crippling loss of Griffiss Air Force Base in 1993 – perhaps the worst single economic blow the county has ever seen." Griffo merged the parks and recreation departments and handed over the city's weights and measures and emergency management departments to the county, resulting in savings. To prevent closures and service cuts, he privatized Rome Hospital, the Erie Canal Village, and city trash collection services.

Griffo brought Woodstock '99 to Rome. The concert was held at the decommissioned Griffiss Air Force Base. Woodstock '99 attracted over 200,000 people but was plagued by many problems, including inadequate staffing, widespread sexual assault, and profiteering by event organizers.

=== Oneida County executive ===
Griffo was appointed Oneida County executive in June 2003 to serve out the term of his predecessor. Griffo was then elected to the post in November 2003. After raising taxes 16% for 2003, his predecessor had announced that taxes for 2004 might need to be raised by as much as 26% due to skyrocketing Medicare costs and retirement benefits. However, after Griffo was appointed county executive, he was able to balance the 2004 budget while raising taxes by 2.9%. In 2005, he implemented a prescription drug plan that cut drug costs for Oneida county residents by up to 38%.

Griffo increased the county sales tax 1.5% in the 2005 budget to cover Medicaid costs. Normally, sales tax revenues are split amongst state, county and townships/cities. However, in order to cover mandated Medicaid costs, the 1.5% increase would all go to the county government. Utica Mayor Tim Julian began claiming a share of the revenues. Griffo remained adamant in refusing to split the revenues. Griffo tried to disarm the situation by offering the city of Utica $800,000 in debt forgiveness, which Julian refused. Griffo eventually won out and the county did not split the extra sales tax revenues with Utica.

Griffo helped stop the New York Regional Interconnect (NYRI) plan to run electricity from Canada through Oneida County. Concerned citizens feared the project would increase electricity costs in the area and pose health and safety risks to residents. A grassroots effort formed opposing the plan, and Griffo supported that effort with $50,000 of county money.

=== New York State Senate ===
In 2006, Griffo ran for the New York State Senate. Utica Mayor Tim Julian ran against Griffo in the Republican primary for State Senator. While Julian lost the primary, he secured a spot on the Independence Party ticket and continued his campaign. A week before the election, Julian dropped out of the race.

Griffo was elected in 2006 to represent the 47th district in the New York State Senate. He replaced Raymond A. Meier, who instead ran unsuccessfully for Congress that year. Among Griffo's significant legislation was a law that created the website ResultsNY.gov, which allowed residents to monitor how state funds were being used. Griffo voted against same-sex marriage legislation on December 2, 2009. In 2011, Griffo voted against allowing same-sex marriage in New York during a Senate roll-call vote on the Marriage Equality Act, which the Senate passed in a close 33–29 vote.

In December 2018, Griffo was appointed deputy minority leader of the State Senate. In January 2019, he was appointed acting minority leader after Minority Leader John J. Flanagan sought treatment for alcoholism.

== Personal life ==
Griffo is married to Lorraine Griffo, an elementary school teacher.

Political offices
Preceded by Carl J. Eilenberg	Mayor of Rome, New York; January 1, 1992 – June, 2003	Succeeded by John J. Mazzaferro (interim)
Preceded by Ralph J. Eannace, Jr.	Oneida County, New York Executive; June, 2003 – December 31, 2006	Succeeded by Anthony J. Picente, Jr.
New York State Senate
Preceded by Raymond A. Meier	New York State Senate, 47th District; January 1, 2007 – present	Incumbent
