= New York City's 3rd City Council district =

- Boundaries following the 2020 census

Government
  - Councilmember: Carl Wilson (D—Hell's Kitchen)

Population (2010)
  - Total: 173,254

Demographics
  - White: 67%
  - Hispanic: 13%
  - Asian: 12%
  - Black: 5%
  - Other: 3%

Registration
  - Democratic: 66.4%
  - Republican: 9.0%
  - No party preference: 21.4%
- Registered voters (2021) 148,339

New York City's 3rd City Council district is one of 51 districts in the New York City Council. It has been represented by Carl Wilson since 2026, succeeding Erik Bottcher. Notable former representatives include Council Speakers Corey Johnson and Christine Quinn.

== Geography ==
District 3 covers the Lower Manhattan neighborhoods of Chelsea, the West Village, Hell's Kitchen, Hudson Square, the Garment District, Flatiron, and parts of Greenwich Village, and Times Square.

Chelsea and West Village, two of the district's main population centers, are both known as preeminent hubs for gay culture. Accordingly, the district has been represented by four consecutive gay councilmembers since 1992. The Stonewall Inn, considered to be the birthplace of gay rights in the United States, is located within the district.

The district overlaps with Manhattan Community Boards 2, 4 and 5, and with New York's 10th and 12th congressional districts. It also overlaps with the 27th, 28th and 47th districts of the New York State Senate, and with the 66th, 67th, 74th and 75th districts of the New York State Assembly.

=== 2010s ===
District 3 covered the Lower Manhattan neighborhoods of Chelsea, the West Village, Hell's Kitchen, Hudson Square, the Garment District, Flatiron, and parts of Greenwich Village, Times Square, and the Upper West Side.

The district overlapped with Manhattan Community Boards 2, 4, 5, and 7, and with New York's 10th and 12th congressional districts. It also overlapped with the 26th, 27th, 28th and 31st districts of the New York State Senate, and with the 66th, 67th, and 75th districts of the New York State Assembly.

== Recent election results ==
=== 2026 general ===
The June primary and November election coincides with midterm elections, including gubernatorial, congressional, and other statewide elections. Following Ballot Question 1's approval in 2019, the primary election will also utilize ranked-choice voting.

2026 New York City Council election, District 3 Democratic primary
Party	Candidate	Maximum round	Maximum votes	Share in maximum round	Maximum votes First round votes Transfer votes
Democratic	Carl Wilson (incumbent)	3	9,249	53.6%	
Democratic	Lindsey Boylan (withdrawn)	3	8,005	46.4%	
Democratic	Layla Law-Gisiko	2	2,327	12.8%	
Democratic	Leslie Boghosian Murphy	2	1,681	9.2%	
Write-in		1	197	1.1%	

2026 New York City Council election, District 3 general election
Party	Candidate	Votes	%
Democratic	Carl Wilson (incumbent)		
Harin Bhatti	Harin Bhatti		
Write-in			
Total votes			

=== 2026 special ===
Then-incumbent Erik Bottcher resigned on February 3, 2026 to serve in the New York State Senate. Two special elections were called: one to fill the seat for the remainder of 2026, and a standard partisan primary and general election to serve the remainder of Bottcher's term. Like all municipal special elections in New York City, the race is officially nonpartisan, with all candidates running on ballot lines of their own creation. Following Ballot Question 1's approval in 2019, special elections will also utilize ranked-choice voting.

2026 New York City Council special election, District 3
Party	Candidate	Maximum round	Maximum votes	Share in maximum round	Maximum votes First round votes Transfer votes
For All of Us	Carl Wilson	4	7,885	59.4%	
People Power	Lindsey Boylan	4	5,391	40.6%	
Affordable NYC	Layla Law-Gisiko	3	3,450	24.1%	
CommunityStrong	Leslie Boghosian Murphy	2	1,572	10.8%	
Write-in		1	75	0.5%	

=== 2025 ===
2025 New York City Council election, District 3
Primary election
Party	Candidate	Votes	%
Democratic	Erik Bottcher (incumbent)	21,871	74.0
Democratic	Jacqueline Lara	7,486	25.3
Write-in		194	0.7
Total votes		29,551	100.0
General election
Democratic	Erik Bottcher (incumbent)	47,354	89.8
Fight and Deliver	Dominick Romeo	4,955	9.2
Write-in		406	0.8
Total votes		52,715	100.0
Democratic hold			

=== 2023 (redistricting) ===
Due to redistricting and the 2020 changes to the New York City Charter, councilmembers elected during the 2021 and 2023 City Council elections will serve two-year terms, with full four-year terms resuming after the 2025 New York City Council elections.

2023 New York City Council election, District 3
Party	Candidate	Votes	%
Democratic	Erik Bottcher (incumbent)	14,167	89.1
Republican	Robert Bobrick	1,469	
Medical Freedom	Robert Bobrick	179	
Total	Robert Bobrick	1,648	10.4
Write-in		88	0.5
Total votes		15,903	100.0
Democratic hold			

=== 2021 ===
In 2019, voters in New York City approved Ballot Question 1, which implemented ranked-choice voting in all local elections. Under the new system, voters have the option to rank up to five candidates for every local office. Voters whose first-choice candidates fare poorly will have their votes redistributed to other candidates in their ranking until one candidate surpasses the 50 percent threshold. If one candidate surpasses 50 percent in first-choice votes, then ranked-choice tabulations will not occur.

2021 New York City Council election, District 3 Democratic primary
Party	Candidate	Maximum round	Maximum votes	Share in maximum round	Maximum votes First round votes Transfer votes
Democratic	Erik Bottcher	4	17,027	71.4%	
Democratic	Arthur Schwartz	4	6,806	28.6%	
Democratic	Leslie Boghosian Murphy	4	5,669	21.6%	
Democratic	Aleta LaFargue	4	3,439	12.6%	
Democratic	Marni Halasa	3	2,442	8.7%	
Democratic	Phelan Dante Fitzpatrick	2	1,597	5.6%	
Write-in		1	125	0.4%	

An interactive map of District 3

2021 New York City Council election, District 3 general election
Party	Candidate	Votes	%
Democratic	Erik Bottcher	27,347	98.5
Write-in		418	1.5
Total votes		27,765	100
Democratic hold			

=== 2017 ===
2017 New York City Council election, District 3
Party	Candidate	Votes	%
Democratic	Corey Johnson	22,997	
Working Families	Corey Johnson	2,747	
Total	Corey Johnson (incumbent)	25,744	93.7
Eco Justice	Marni Halasa	1,556	5.7
Write-in		165	0.6
Total votes		27,465	100
Democratic hold			

=== 2013 ===
2013 New York City Council election, District 3
Primary election
Party	Candidate	Votes	%
Democratic	Corey Johnson	12,535	63.3
Democratic	Yetta Kurland	7,275	36.7
Write-in		6	0.0
Total votes		19,816	100
General election
Democratic	Corey Johnson	21,692	
Working Families	Corey Johnson	1,916	
Total	Corey Johnson	23,608	86.3
Republican	Richard Stewart	3,691	13.5
Write-in		72	0.3
Total votes		27,371	100
Democratic hold			

== Previous councilmembers ==
- Theodore S. Weiss (1966-1973)
- Miriam Friedlander (1974-1991)
- Carol Greitzer (1991)
- Thomas Duane (1992-1998)
- Christine Quinn (1999-2013)
- Corey Johnson (2014–2021)
- Erik Bottcher (2021-2026)
