= Andrew Cuomo sexual harassment allegations =

2020s U.S. scandal

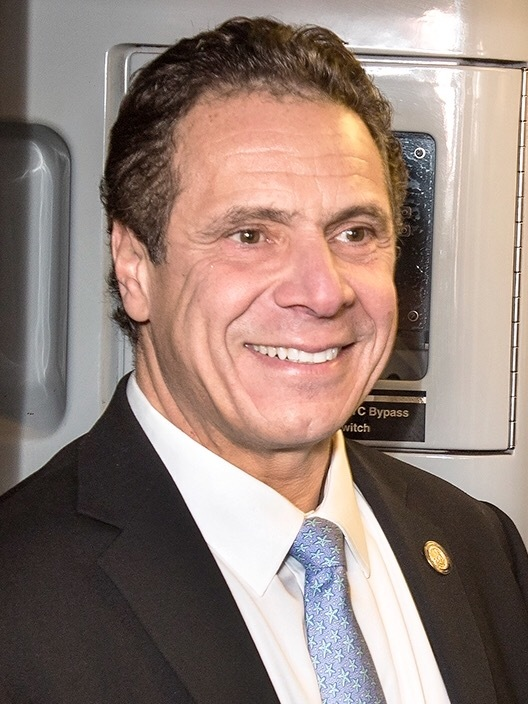
Cuomo in 2017

Andrew Cuomo, the 56th governor of New York, was accused of sexual harassment by multiple women starting in December 2020, with the accusations covering a range of alleged behavior. He denied all of the most serious accusations while acknowledging that he had been "insensitive or too personal" while attempting playful banter. On February 28, 2021, New York Attorney General Letitia James announced that she would hire and deputize a law firm to conduct an independent investigation into the allegations. On March 11, the New York State Assembly authorized an impeachment investigation into the allegations. In August 2021, James released an investigatory report that stated that Cuomo sexually harassed eleven women during his time in office, with actions such as unwanted groping, kissing and sexual comments. The controversy surrounding these allegations culminated in Governor Cuomo's resignation from office. Cuomo was replaced by his Lieutenant Governor, Kathy Hochul.

The entire New York congressional delegation, including New York's two United States Senators, Majority Leader Chuck Schumer and Kirsten Gillibrand, and over 120 New York State legislators called for Cuomo's resignation, as did House Speaker Nancy Pelosi, Bill de Blasio, the mayor of New York City, and Eric Adams, the Brooklyn Borough President and Democratic nominee for Mayor of New York City. President Joe Biden stated his support for Attorney General James's independent investigation; he later called on Cuomo to resign after the investigatory report was released. On August 10, Cuomo announced that he would step down from office in 14 days, making his resignation effective on August 24.

On January 4, 2022, Albany County District Attorney David Soares dropped a criminal complaint against Cuomo and also announced that Cuomo would not face any other charges related to other groping allegations, citing lack of evidence. Three days later, a judge dropped the criminal charge against Cuomo. On January 31, 2022, the last of five criminal cases that had been pursued against Cuomo were dismissed.

== Sexual harassment allegations ==
=== Lindsey Boylan ===
Lindsey Boylan
(@LindseyBoylan)
tweeted:

Do not trust @CarlHeastie. His impeachment investigation is not designed to be transparent or to move fast, and there's nothing @NYGovCuomo wants more than time.
Many of us have not put our whole lives on the line for this crap. I certainly have not and will not.

March 17, 2021

In December 2020, Lindsey Boylan, a former aide to New York Governor Andrew Cuomo, and then a candidate for Manhattan Borough President, accused him in a series of tweets of sexual harassment and creating a toxic environment. The New York Times published a link to Boylan's lengthy essay in Medium wherein she accused Cuomo of sexual harassment and "described several years of uncomfortable interactions." She said she resigned in 2018 after "he forcibly kissed her during a meeting." She also alleged that "he had compared her to a former girlfriend, and asked her to play strip poker." Cuomo has denied these allegations. In an interview, Boylan said Cuomo's questions and comments about sexual issues made her conclude, "The governor's trying to sleep with me."

On March 17, Boylan criticized Speaker of the New York State Assembly Carl Heastie and the New York State Assembly's impeachment investigation, tweeting "What would be the point of survivors talking to investigators of your sham investigation @CarlHeastie?" Boylan cooperated with the Attorney General of New York's independent investigation, and met with the investigators on March 16.

In an article written by Ronan Farrow in The New Yorker, Boylan also claimed Cuomo made an inappropriate comment concerning his new dog, Captain. After a February 2018 news conference, Cuomo's dog, a Shepherd-Malamute mix, jumped up and down near her. Boylan claims that Cuomo said, if he were a dog, he would try to "mount" her as well. Boylan said she remembered "being grossed out" and that it was "a dumb third-grade thing to say". She did not respond to Cuomo's remark, and said in the article: "I just shrugged it off." A Cuomo spokesperson declined to comment.

==== Allegations of smearing and silencing Boylan ====
On March 16, 2021, The New York Times reported that after Boylan accused Cuomo in December 2020, an open letter was circulated by people close to the governor that they attempted to get former staffers to sign, which suggested that her accusation was planned and for political reasons, among others attempting to associate her name with supporters of Donald Trump. One source claimed that Cuomo himself was involved in its creation. The letter was never released. Boylan's personnel records were ultimately released to media organizations.

The Wall Street Journal reported that after Boylan's accusations came out, Cuomo's office called at least six former aides with questions related to Boylan, including whether they had been in contact with her. Some of those who were contacted stated that they felt the calls were a form of intimidation.

==== Allegations of falsehoods by Boylan ====
In her book What's Left Unsaid: My Life at the Center of Power, Politics & Crisis, published in 2023, Cuomo's former aide Melissa DeRosa pushes back against many of Boylan's accusations, including that allegations of harassment did not come up either during her stint working for Cuomo's team or afterward, until suddenly she was tweeting about harassment.

=== Charlotte Bennett ===
In late February 2021, Charlotte Bennett, an executive assistant and health policy advisor to Cuomo, accused him of sexual harassment, which included questions about her sex life. In a March 5 video interview with CBS Evening News anchor Norah O'Donnell, Bennett said that during a one-on-one meeting in the governor's office on June 5, 2020, Cuomo implied "that I was old enough for him and he was lonely." Bennett went on to claim that Cuomo's office director took the state's mandatory sexual harassment training for him: "I was there. I heard [the office director] say, 'I can't believe I'm doing this for you' and making a joke about the fact that she was completing the training for him. And then I heard her at the end ask him to sign the certificate."

=== Anna Ruch ===
In early March 2021, a third accuser, Anna Ruch, a member of the Obama administration (who later served on Joe Biden's presidential campaign), said that when they were speaking at a wedding reception Cuomo put a hand on her back, that she removed it, and that he then placed his hands on her face cheeks and asked if he could kiss her. A friend photographed Cuomo touching her face.

=== Ana Liss ===
On March 6, 2021, Ana Liss, a policy and operations aide to Cuomo from 2013 to 2015, became the third former aide to accuse Cuomo of sexual harassment. Liss said Cuomo called her "sweetheart", touched her on her lower back while they were at a reception, and also once kissed her hand after she stood up from her desk.

=== Karen Hinton ===
Also on March 6, Karen Hinton, a former press aide for Cuomo when he served as the US Secretary of Housing and Urban Development, said that in 2000, Cuomo had, while meeting with her in a California hotel room, hugged her in an "inappropriate" and "unethical" embrace. Hinton has more recently worked for Cuomo rival New York Mayor Bill de Blasio.

=== Brittany Commisso ===
On March 9, 2021, the Times Union of Albany reported an anonymous member of the governor's Executive Chamber staff had accused Cuomo of inappropriate touching. On March 11, the same newspaper reported she said Cuomo called her to his mansion, reached under her blouse, and fondled her. Cuomo denied the allegation.

On April 7, 2021, an unnamed executive assistant to Cuomo alleged that she had been called to the governor's mansion in November 2020 to help Cuomo troubleshoot an issue with his phone. Cuomo allegedly groped her. After the aide told him his behavior would "get us in trouble", Cuomo then shut the door, said "I don't care", and groped one of her breasts. A month later she claimed that Cuomo told her to cover up what had occurred. Her identity was revealed on August 8, 2021, as Brittany Commisso.

=== Kaitlin ===
On March 12, Kaitlin (last name unreported), who formerly worked for the governor's office, alleged that Cuomo had made her feel uncomfortable in various situations, with his comments, questions, requests, and invasions of her personal space. She did not allege inappropriate touching or explicit sexual propositions.

=== Jessica Bakeman ===
Jessica Bakeman, a former member of the Capitol press corps who worked for Politico New York, wrote about the atmosphere for women in Albany, New York. On March 12, for the New York magazine website, she wrote that Cuomo had touched her on her arms, shoulders, the small of her back, and waist in 2012, and put his arm around her back and his hand on her waist posing for a picture at a holiday party in 2014 (she wrote that "For years, I would relive that moment at the holiday party"), and made multiple "humiliating" comments during her time covering him. She wrote of the incident in 2014: "Keeping his grip on me as I practically squirmed to get away from him, the governor turned my body to face a different direction for yet another picture. He never let go of my hand."

=== Valerie Bauman ===
On March 18, Valerie Bauman, a reporter for Bloomberg, said in a tweet that during Cuomo's tenure as New York Attorney General from 2007 to 2010, there was a period of "rampant sexism and sexual harassment". Cuomo allegedly also made her uncomfortable with unwanted flirting and eye contact.

=== Alyssa McGrath ===
On March 19, Alyssa McGrath, the first current employee to come forward publicly, spoke to The New York Times claiming Cuomo chronically ogled female aides like herself, commenting about their appearances in a way McGrath found inappropriate. McGrath also said that the aide who alleged Cuomo sexually assaulted her in the Executive Mansion "described the encounter in detail to her after it was made public in a report in the Times Union last week." McGrath claimed that Cuomo told her not to talk with the anonymous aide about the incident.

=== Sherry Vill ===
During a March 29, 2021, Zoom news conference with an attorney, Sherry Vill alleged that Cuomo kissed her cheek in front of family members while visiting areas of Rochester damaged by a flood in May 2017. Vill said the kiss was of a "highly sexual manner". Cuomo also kissed Vill on the cheek a second time in a "very aggressive manner".

=== Unnamed state trooper ===
According to the August 2021 report, Cuomo met the state trooper in November 2017 and lobbied to hire her as part of his security detail despite her not satisfying the requirements for the post; she was indeed hired, and Cuomo later inappropriately touched her stomach and back, and also made inappropriate comments.

=== First unnamed state entity employee ===
According to the August 2021 report, Cuomo met this unnamed state entity employee at an event in September 2019, where he tapped and grabbed her buttocks while they were posing for photographs.

=== Second unnamed state entity employee ===
According to the August 2021 report, Cuomo in March 2020 made inappropriate comments to this unnamed state entity employee, a doctor, who had administered a nasal swab test on Cuomo at a press conference.

=== Virginia Limmiatis ===
According to the August 2021 report, Cuomo met energy company employee Virginia Limmiatis at an event in May 2017, where he touched her chest with his fingers. Her case was dismissed by district attorney Greggory Oakes on January 31, 2022, the last one to be dropped, effectively clearing the former governor of all criminal charges.

=== Other witnesses ===
According to the August 2021 report, other witnesses, in addition to the named complainants who came with specific instances, noted that Cuomo made comments or jokes that seemed sexual or suggestive in meetings with staff from the Executive Chamber. One former staff member recalled hearing Cuomo repeatedly make a joke about how a young bull runs down the hill to have sex with one [cow] and the old bull walks down the hill to have sex with all of them, meaning that it is better to slow down and get a lot of things done. Cuomo denied recollection of this reported incident.

During the spring of 2016, Cuomo spotted a bottle on an executive assistant's desk labeled "Skinny Bunny", with an accompanying image of rabbit ears. After learning the executive assistant was drinking Skinny Bunny Organic Matcha Tea in an attempt to lose weight in advance of her wedding, Cuomo asked the Executive Assistant if she was trying to look like a "Playboy Bunny".

Two witnesses also recounted that during a meeting, the Governor looked at his Emmy statuette, which he was awarded in November 2020 and put in his Albany office, and said something to the effect of, "look at her figure. Isn't she buxom?"

In December 2020 or in January 2021, the Governor was meeting with members of his staff to discuss a meeting with the White House related to COVID-19, when the Governor "expressed disappointment that he did not have any 'catchy one-liners' in his speech, and said something to the effect of, 'You need to give me some catchy one-liners. Come up with a line like, "you’re having sex without the orgasm."'"

== Reactions ==
=== Andrew Cuomo ===
In a statement on February 28, Cuomo said:

I now understand that my interactions may have been insensitive or too personal and that some of my comments, given my position, made others feel in ways I never intended ... At work sometimes I think I am being playful and make jokes that I think are funny. I mean no offense and only attempt to add some levity and banter to what is a very serious business.

After the sixth accuser complaint, the governor's office declined to comment on the article or the alleged incident. Cuomo, speaking on a conference call with reporters on March 9, 2021 about an hour after the Times Union reported the latest accusation of inappropriate touching, said he was unaware of the new allegation, but reiterated previous declarations that he "never touched anybody inappropriately". On March 11, 2021, Cuomo attacked the lawmakers who have called for his resignation, calling them "reckless and dangerous" for telling him to resign without letting the investigations complete. Cuomo also attacked "cancel culture" and the lawmakers who bow to its pressure.

On August 10, 2021, despite denying all allegations of sexual harassment, Cuomo announced he would step down as Governor of New York, effective August 24. On August 21, Cuomo said that Hurricane Henri would not affect his resignation. Upon his resignation, he was succeeded by Lieutenant Governor Kathy Hochul, who became the first female governor in the history of New York.

=== Political figures ===
Politicians who called for Cuomo's resignation or impeachment

Federal government

- Joe Biden, 46th President of the United States
- Kamala Harris, 49th Vice President of the United States

U.S. senators

- Kirsten Gillibrand, junior U.S. Senator for New York
- Chuck Schumer, senior U.S. Senator for New York; United States Senate Majority Leader
- Cory Booker, junior U.S. Senator for New Jersey
- Bob Menendez, senior U.S. Senator for New Jersey
- Maggie Hassan, junior U.S. Senator for New Hampshire
- Jeanne Shaheen, senior U.S. Senator for New Hampshire
- Chuck Grassley, senior U.S. Senator for Iowa (Republican)

U.S. representatives

- Nancy Pelosi, California's 12th congressional district; Speaker of the United States House of Representatives
- Ann McLane Kuster – New Hampshire's 2nd congressional district
- Chris Pappas – New Hampshire's 1st congressional district
- Jamaal Bowman – New York's 16th congressional district
- Yvette Clarke – New York's 9th congressional district
- Antonio Delgado – New York's 19th congressional district
- Adriano Espaillat – New York's 13th congressional district
- Andrew Garbarino – New York's 2nd congressional district (Republican)
- Brian Higgins – New York's 26th congressional district
- Chris Jacobs – New York's 27th congressional district (Republican)
- Hakeem Jeffries - New York's 8th congressional district
- Mondaire Jones – New York's 17th congressional district
- John Katko – New York's 24th congressional district (Republican)
- Nicole Malliotakis – New York's 11th congressional district (Republican)
- Carolyn Maloney – New York's 12th congressional district
- Sean Patrick Maloney – New York's 18th congressional district
- Gregory Meeks – New York's 5th congressional district
- Grace Meng – New York's 6th congressional district
- Joseph Morelle – New York's 25th congressional district
- Jerry Nadler – New York's 10th congressional district
- Alexandria Ocasio-Cortez – New York's 14th congressional district
- Kathleen Rice – New York's 4th congressional district
- Tom Reed – New York's 23rd congressional district (Republican)
- Elise Stefanik – New York's 21st congressional district (Republican)
- Thomas Suozzi – New York's 3rd congressional district
- Claudia Tenney – New York's 22nd congressional district (Republican)
- Paul Tonko – New York's 20th congressional district
- Ritchie Torres – New York's 15th congressional district
- Nydia Velázquez – New York's 7th congressional district
- Lee Zeldin – New York's 1st congressional district (Republican)

State governors

- Roy Cooper, Governor of North Carolina
- Ned Lamont, Governor of Connecticut
- Dan McKee, Governor of Rhode Island
- Phil Murphy, Governor of New Jersey
- Gavin Newsom, Governor of California
- J. B. Pritzker, Governor of Illinois
- Tom Wolf, Governor of Pennsylvania
- Tony Evers, Governor of Wisconsin
- Charlie Baker, Governor of Massachusetts (Republican)
- Chris Sununu, Governor of New Hampshire (Republican)
- Gretchen Whitmer, Governor of Michigan

New York statewide officials

- Thomas DiNapoli, New York State Comptroller
- Letitia James, New York State Attorney General

New York City officials

- Bill de Blasio, New York City Mayor
- Jumaane D. Williams, New York City Public Advocate
- Eric Adams, borough president of Brooklyn, 2021 candidate for Mayor
- Donovan Richards, borough president of Queens

New York city councillors

- Diana Ayala – 8th district
- Joseph Borelli – 51st district
- Justin Brannan – 43rd district
- Fernando Cabrera – 14th district
- Costa Constantinides – 22nd district
- James Gennaro – 24th district
- Corey Johnson – 3rd district; Speaker of the New York City Council
- Ben Kallos – 5th district
- Brad Lander – 39th district
- Stephen Levin – 33rd district
- Keith Powers – 4th district
- Antonio Reynoso – 34th district
- Jimmy Van Bramer – 26th district

Local officials

- Pat Ryan, Ulster County Executive
- Laura Curran, Nassau County Executive
- Steve Bellone, Suffolk County Executive
- George Latimer, Westchester County Executive
- James Tedesco III, Bergen County Executive
- Joseph N. DiVincenzo Jr, Essex County Executive

Democratic Party officials

- Ian Phillips, Cayuga County Democratic Party chairperson

Political parties

- The Working Families Party of New York
- The New York State Democratic Committee
- The New York Republican State Committee

==== Other reactions ====
Speaker of the House Nancy Pelosi said in a statement to Fox News that "The women who have come forward with serious and credible charges against Gov. Cuomo deserve to be heard and to be treated with dignity."

Speaker of the New York State Assembly Carl Heastie urged Cuomo to "seriously consider whether he can effectively meet the needs of the people of New York."

Senate Majority Leader Chuck Schumer, speaking on SiriusXM satellite radio, called the allegations "nauseating". However, he initially stopped short of asking for Cuomo's resignation before doing so on March 12 with the other Senator from New York, Kirsten Gillibrand.

The New York Republican State Committee advocated for Cuomo's impeachment in a statement released March 12, writing "If I've said it once, I've said it a hundred times: we already have ample evidence that proves Andrew Cuomo is unfit to serve and anything short of a full impeachment is a complicit move to keep him as Governor."

==== New York State Legislature ====
Members listed are members of the Democratic party unless otherwise noted.

The assembly announced that it would start an impeachment investigation, prior the governor's resignation announcement. There has been no official announcement as to whether that investigation will continue after he leaves office. The New York State Constitution does not prevent a former governor from being impeached and prevented from running for office again (if convicted by the senate).

Members who called for Cuomo's resignation or impeachment, prior to his resignation announcement

New York State Assembly (150 members)

1. Tom Abinanti – 92nd district
2. Khaleel Anderson – 31st district
3. Jacob Ashby – 107th district (Republican)
4. William A. Barclay – 120th district (Republican)
  - Minority Leader of the New York State Assembly (Republican)
5. Brian Barnwell – 30th district
6. Ken Blankenbush – 117th district (Republican)
7. Harry Bronson – 138th district
8. Keith Brown – 12th district (Republican)
9. Kenny Burgos – 85th district
10. Pat Burke – 142nd district
11. Marianne Buttenschon – 119th district
12. Kevin Byrne – 94th district (Republican)
13. Marjorie Byrnes – 133rd district (Republican)
14. Robert Carroll – 44th district
15. Sarah Clark – 136nd district
16. William Conrad – 140th district
17. Carmen De La Rosa – 72nd district
18. Joe DeStefano – 3rd district (Republican)
19. David DiPietro – 147th district (Republican)
20. Michael Durso – 9th district (Republican)
21. Simcha Eichenstein – 48th district
22. Harvey Epstein – 74th district
23. Nathalia Fernandez – 80th district
24. Phara Souffrant Forrest – 57th district
25. Christopher S. Friend – 124th district (Republican)
26. Mathylde Frontus – 46th district
27. Emily Gallagher – 50th district
28. Jarett Gandolfo – 7th district (Republican)
29. Jodi Giglio – 2nd district (Republican)
30. Joseph Giglio – 148th district (Republican)
31. Jessica González-Rojas – 34th district
32. Richard N. Gottfried – 75th district
33. Aileen Gunther – 100th district
34. Stephen Hawley – 139th district (Republican)
35. Carl Heastie – 83rd district;
  - Speaker of the New York Assembly
36. Andrew Hevesi – 28th district
37. Jonathan Jacobson – 104th district
38. Josh Jensen – 134th district (Republican)
39. Billy Jones – 115th district
40. Anna Kelles – 125th district
41. Ron Kim – 40th district
42. Kieran Lalor – 105th district (Republican)
43. Mike Lawler – 97th district (Republican)
44. John Lemondes Jr. – 126th district (Republican)
45. Jennifer Lunsford – 135th district
46. Zohran Mamdani – 36th district
47. Brian Manktelow – 130th district (Republican)
48. David McDonough – 14th district (Republican)
49. Karen McMahon – 146th district
50. Demond Meeks – 137th district
51. Brian Miller – 101st district (Republican)
52. Melissa Miller – 20th district (Republican)
53. Marcela Mitaynes – 51st district
54. Michael Montesano – 15th district (Republican)
55. Yuh-Line Niou – 65th district
56. Mike Norris – 144th district (Republican)
57. Philip Palmesano – 132nd district (Republican)
58. Amy Paulin – 88th district
59. Victor M. Pichardo – 86th district
60. Dan Quart – 73rd district
61. Ed Ra – 19th district (Republican)
62. Michael Reilly – 62nd district (Republican)
63. Karines Reyes – 87th district
64. Diana Richardson – 43rd district
65. Jose Rivera – 78th district
66. Daniel Rosenthal – 27th district
67. Linda Rosenthal – 67th district
68. Nily Rozic – 25th district
69. John Salka – 121st district (Republican)
70. Colin Schmitt – 99th district (Republican)
71. Angelo Santabarbara – 111th district
72. Jo Anne Simon – 52nd district
73. Matt Simpson – 114th district (Republican)
74. Douglas M. Smith – 5th district (Republican)
75. Robert Smullen – 118th district (Republican)
76. Christopher Tague – 102nd district (Republican)
77. Michael Tannousis – 64th district (Republican)
78. Fred Thiele - 1st district (Independence)
79. Clyde Vanel – 33rd district
80. Mark Walczyk – 116th district (Republican)
81. Monica P. Wallace – 143rd district
82. Mary Beth Walsh – 112th district (Republican)
83. Carrie Woerner – 113th district

New York state senators (63 members)

1. Jamaal Bailey – 36th district
2. Brian Benjamin – 30th district
3. Alessandra Biaggi – 34th district
4. George Borrello – 57th district (Republican)
5. Jabari Brisport – 25th district
6. John Brooks – 8th district
7. Samra Brouk – 55th district
8. Jeremy Cooney – 56th district
9. Jim Gaughran – 5th district
10. Michael Gianaris – 12th district;
  - Deputy Majority Leader of the New York State Senate
11. Andrew Gounardes – 22nd district
12. Peter Harckham – 40th district
13. Michelle Hinchey – 46th district
14. Brad Hoylman – 27th district
15. Robert Jackson – 31st district
16. Daphne Jordan – 43rd district (Republican)
17. Todd Kaminsky – 9th district
18. Anna Kaplan – 7th district
19. Brian P. Kavanagh – 26th district
20. Timothy M. Kennedy – 63rd district
21. Liz Krueger – 28th district
22. John Liu – 11th district
23. John Mannion – 50th district
24. Mike Martucci – 42nd district (Republican)
25. Rachel May – 53rd district
26. Shelley Mayer – 37th district
27. Zellnor Myrie – 20th district
28. Tom O'Mara – 58th district (Republican)
29. Peter Oberacker – 51st district (Republican)
30. Rob Ortt – 62nd district (Republican)
  - Minority Leader of the New York State Senate
31. Jessica Ramos – 13th district
32. Elijah Reichlin-Melnick – 38th district
33. Gustavo Rivera – 33rd district
34. Sean Ryan – 60th district
35. Julia Salazar – 18th district
36. James Sanders Jr. – 10th district
37. José M. Serrano – 29th district
38. James Skoufis – 39th district
39. Toby Ann Stavisky – 16th district
40. Andrea Stewart-Cousins – 35th district
  - New York State Senate Majority Leader
41. Jim Tedisco – 49th district (Republican)
42. Kevin Thomas – 6th district
43. Alexis Weik – 3rd district (Republican)

New Jersey Senate

1. Loretta Weinberg – New Jersey's 37th legislative district and New Jersey Senate Majority Leader
2. Paul Sarlo – New Jersey's 36th legislative district and Mayor of Wood-Ridge, New Jersey
3. Kristin Corrado – New Jersey's 40th legislative district
4. Holly Schepisi - New Jersey's 39th legislative district

=== Public opinion ===
Andrew Cuomo should resign

Poll source	Date(s) administered	Sample size (Note: Key: A – all adults RV – registered voters LV – likely voters V – unclear)	Margin of error	Should resign	Should remain in office	Unsure
Quinnipiac University	August 4–5, 2021	615 (RV)	± 4.0%	70%	20%	5%
Emerson College	August 4–5, 2021	1,182 (RV)	± 2.8%	60%	26%	14%
Marist College	August 4, 2021	614 (A)	± 5.1%	59%	32%	9%
Marist College	August 4, 2021	542 (RV)	± 5.5%	63%	29%	8%

Andrew Cuomo should be impeached

Poll source	Date(s) administered	Sample size	Margin of error	Should be impeached	Should not be impeached	Unsure
Quinnipiac University	August 4–5, 2021	615 (RV)	± 4.0%	63%	29%	8%
Emerson College	August 4–5, 2021	1,182 (RV)	± 2.8%	58%	27%	15%
Marist College	August 4, 2021	614 (A)	± 5.1%	59%	28%	13%
Marist College	August 4, 2021	542 (RV)	± 5.5%	59%	28%	13%

=== Other ===
Some supporters of Cuomo have alleged a conspiracy theory that allegations against him were motivated on the basis of ousting him in order to bring a Republican to power who would proceed to "pardon" former President Donald Trump; this despite the fact that Cuomo's resignation would result in Democratic Lieutenant Governor Kathy Hochul ascending to the governorship (Hochul has run on four ballot lines: Democratic, Conservative, Independence, and Working Families Party).

Some Twitter users have compared the allegations against Cuomo to those against Al Franken, a Democratic Senator from Minnesota forced to resign over sexual harassment allegations in 2017. However, Inae Oh, writing for Mother Jones, argued that the allegations against Cuomo are much more serious, and that comparing the two minimizes the allegations and investigations against Cuomo.

== Investigations ==
=== Attorney General-commissioned investigation ===
In February 2021, Letitia James, the Attorney General of New York, announced that she would oversee an independent investigation into the accusations against Cuomo. In a statement, James said, "We will hire a law firm, deputize them as attorneys of our office, and oversee a rigorous and independent investigation." On June 24, 2021, The Wall Street Journal reported that James directed investigators to interview Rich Azzopardi, a senior adviser to Cuomo, about the reported sexual harassment allegations against Cuomo from over a decade ago to the present.

On August 3, 2021, Letitia James released an investigation report which accused Cuomo of sexually harassment against Lindsey Boylan, Charlotte Bennett, Anna Ruch, Ana Liss, Alyssa McGrath, Virginia Limmiatis, aide Kaitlin (last name withheld), an unnamed executive assistant (identified as Brittany Commisso by CBS News), an unnamed New York State trooper and two unnamed state entity employees. The investigation concluded that Cuomo's behavior included unwanted groping, kissing and sexual comments, and also found that Cuomo's office had engaged in illegal retaliation against Boylan for her allegation against him. Cuomo responded to the report with a denial: "I never touched anyone inappropriately."

=== Impeachment investigation ===
Later, State Assembly Speaker Carl Heastie approved the State Assembly's judiciary committee's request to initiate an impeachment investigation into the allegations. James said the impeachment investigation would have "no bearing" on her own investigation.

The first step in impeaching a sitting New York governor after the drafting of the articles of impeachment is a simple majority vote in the State Assembly to approve the articles. 76 out of the 150 members would need to vote to approve the articles. The trial in the State Senate would occur next. 62 out of the 63 members would act as jurors (Majority Leader Andrea Stewart-Cousins would have to recuse herself because she is in the line of succession as the Temporary President of the State Senate, which coincides with the position of Majority Leader). The 7 judges of the New York Court of Appeals, New York's highest court, would also be jurors in the trial. There would need to be a 2/3 majority of those 69 jurors to convict which would be 46.

Before Cuomo resigned, both the Assembly and State Senate had the votes to impeach and remove him from office.

=== Criminal investigation ===
On October 28, 2021, a spokesman for the state court system announced that Cuomo would be charged with misdemeanor "sex crime", for forcible touching, in the Albany City Court. Albany County Sheriff Craig Apple's office would file a criminal complaint against Cuomo in connection with Brittany Commisso's allegation. On January 4, 2022, however, Albany County District Attorney David Soares announced that he would not prosecute Cuomo and asked a judge to dismiss the criminal complaint due to lack of evidence. Soars stated that "While we found the complainant in this case cooperative and credible, after review of all the available evidence, we have concluded that we cannot meet our burden at trial." Soares also said his office considered other potential criminal charges, but none fit the allegations. On January 7, 2022, Judge Holly Drexler officially accepted the dismissal of the criminal complaint against Cuomo. On January 31, 2022, the last of the five criminal inquiries which had been pursued against Cuomo, this time involving accuser Virginia Limmiatis, was dismissed in Oswego County due to insufficient evidence.

In 2023, a federal magistrate judge denied Cuomo's request to compel the state attorney general's office and the state Assembly Judiciary Committee to turn over records from the former governor's extensive sexual harassment investigations, including unredacted transcripts of all witness statements. According to a recent investigation, Cuomo's sister played a significant part in attacks on women who accused her brother of sexual harassment. According to The New York Times, Madeline Cuomo spent two years working with grassroots organisers to discredit her brother's accusers.

Cuomo's attorneys subpoena five women who accused the former governor of sexual harassment in a civil action. This includes social media assaults on Charlotte Bennett after she filed a complaint against the former governor.

== Political effect ==
Many news organizations and political pundits proposed that the allegations, combined with Cuomo's simultaneous scandal of allegedly covering up COVID-19 nursing home deaths, could severely diminish Cuomo's chances of re-election in the 2022 gubernatorial election. A poll from the Quinnipiac University Polling Institute released on March 4, 2021, showed that 45% of New Yorkers approved of Cuomo's job performance, as opposed to 46% of New Yorkers who disapproved. Earlier, in May 2020, 72% of voters had approved of Cuomo's job performance, while 24% disapproved. The same poll found that 36% of New Yorkers wanted Cuomo to run for re-election, whereas 59% did not.

Republicans successfully persuaded Lee Zeldin, a U.S. Representative from New York's 1st congressional district, to run in the gubernatorial election due to the scandals.

The scandal also raised considerations that several Democrats could run against Cuomo in the primary; potential challengers included Lieutenant Governor Kathy Hochul (who replaced him once he left office), Attorney General Letitia James (who investigated him), Mayor of New York City Bill de Blasio, New York City Public Advocate Jumaane Williams, New York State Comptroller Tom DiNapoli, State Senator Alessandra Biaggi, and U.S. Representative Alexandria Ocasio-Cortez. Hochul ultimately defeated Zeldin to win a full four-year term in her own right.

== See also ==
- MeToo movement – Social movement against sexual abuse and harassment
