= Carl Wilson (New York politician) =

American politician (born 1991)

- Wilson speaking in September 2026

Member of the New York City Council from the 3rd district
- Incumbent
- Assumed office May 12, 2026
- Preceded by: Erik Bottcher

Personal details
- Born: Carl Michael Wilson; 1991 (age 34–35)
- Party: Democratic
- Domestic partner: James
- Education: New York University (BFA)
- Website: Campaign website

Carl Michael Wilson (born 1991) is an American activist and politician. He was elected in the 2026 special election to succeed Erik Bottcher as the member of the New York City Council from the city's 3rd council district, defeating Lindsey Boylan, who was endorsed by mayor Zohran Mamdani. Prior to his election, he served as Bottcher's chief of staff. A resident of the Hell's Kitchen neighborhood in Manhattan, Wilson grew up in Bowie, Maryland and moved to New York City in 2009 to attend New York University and pursue an acting career.

Wilson (far-right) attends a 2026 protest against NYU Langone's decision to bar minors from gender-affirming care.

== Electoral history ==
=== 2026 ===
2026 New York City's 3rd City Council district special election
Party	Candidate	Maximum round	Maximum votes	Share in maximum round	Maximum votes First round votes Transfer votes
For All of Us	Carl Wilson	4	7,885	59.4%	
People Power	Lindsey Boylan	4	5,391	40.6%	
Affordable NYC	Layla Law-Gisiko	3	3,450	24.1%	
CommunityStrong	Leslie Boghosian Murphy	2	1,575	10.8%	
Write-In		1	75	0.5%	

2026 New York City's 3rd City Council district Democratic primary election
Party	Candidate	Maximum round	Maximum votes	Share in maximum round	Maximum votes First round votes Transfer votes
Democratic	Carl Wilson (incumbent)	3	9,249	53.6%	
Democratic	Lindsey Boylan	3	8,005	46.4%	
Democratic	Layla Law-Gisiko	2	2,327	12.8%	
Democratic	Leslie Boghosian Murphy	2	1,681	9.2%	
Write-In		1	197	1.1%	

2026 New York City's 3rd City Council district election
Party	Candidate	Votes	%	±%
Democratic	Carl Wilson (incumbent)			
Haris Bhatti	Haris Bhatti			
Write-in				
Total votes				
