= Corey Johnson (politician) =

American politician (born 1982)

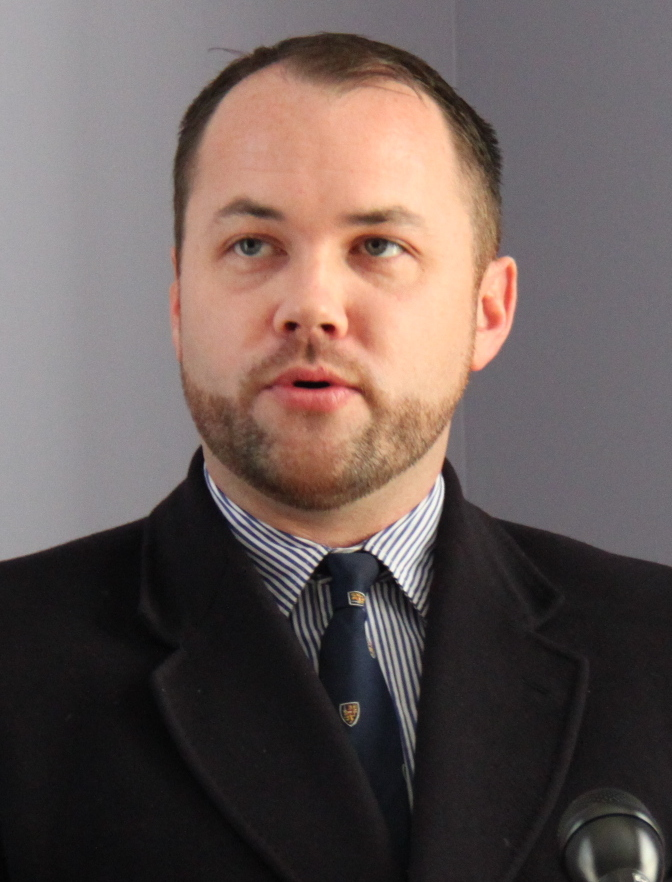

Speaker of the New York City Council
- In office January 3, 2018 – December 31, 2021
- Preceded by: Melissa Mark-Viverito
- Succeeded by: Adrienne Adams

Member of the New York City Council from the 3rd district
- In office January 1, 2014 – December 31, 2021
- Preceded by: Christine Quinn
- Succeeded by: Erik Bottcher

New York City Public Advocate
- Acting
- In office January 1, 2019 – March 19, 2019
- Preceded by: Letitia James
- Succeeded by: Jumaane Williams

Personal details
- Born: April 28, 1982 (age 44) Beverly, Massachusetts, U.S.
- Party: Democratic
- Education: George Washington University (attended)
- Website: Official website

Corey David Johnson (born April 28, 1982) is an American politician and lobbyist. A member of the Democratic Party, he was Speaker of the New York City Council from January 2018 to January 2022.

The third district includes Hell's Kitchen, Chelsea, the West Village, as well as parts of Flatiron, SoHo, and the Upper West Side of Manhattan. He also concurrently served as Acting New York City Public Advocate for a few weeks in early 2019.

Johnson was first elected to the council as the member for the 3rd district in 2013. At the time, Johnson was the first out gay man to serve as speaker, and the only openly HIV-positive politician in New York State.

In 2019, Johnson announced he was running for mayor of New York City, but he stopped fund-raising in March 2020, and in September 2020 withdrew from the race, saying he had had depression since May 2020 and did not think he could campaign and be effective as speaker while monitoring his mental health. He instead ran unsuccessfully for comptroller.

== Early life ==
Johnson was born in Beverly, Massachusetts, and raised in nearby wealthy Middleton, by his mother, Ann Queenan Richardson (who worked at a variety of jobs, including at a thrift shop that she founded and manages), and his stepfather, Rodney Richardson, owner of Middleton Tire Service and a truck driver. Johnson's father, David Johnson, the son of an American father and a Korean mother, left the family when his son was very young.

Johnson made national headlines in 2000 when, while co-captain of the Masconomet Regional High School football team, he publicly came out as gay. His story was reported by major national news outlets, including The New York Times and 20/20. He graduated from high school in 2000.

In 2004, Johnson was diagnosed as HIV-positive. In 2009, he acknowledged to himself that he had been addicted to alcohol and cocaine for six years and had to stop, deciding to become sober.

=== Early career ===
Johnson spent less than one month at George Washington University before dropping out. He then moved to New York City and engaged in LGBT rights activism. He was a contributor and eventually the political director of the LGBT blog Towleroad. In 2005, he joined Manhattan Community Board 4 (CB4). From 2008 to 2010, Johnson was the government relations director at GFI Development, a Manhattan-based real estate developer. He was elected chair of CB4 in 2011, becoming New York City's youngest community board chair at the time. The same year, City & State profiled him as a "rising star" in New York City politics.

== New York City Council ==
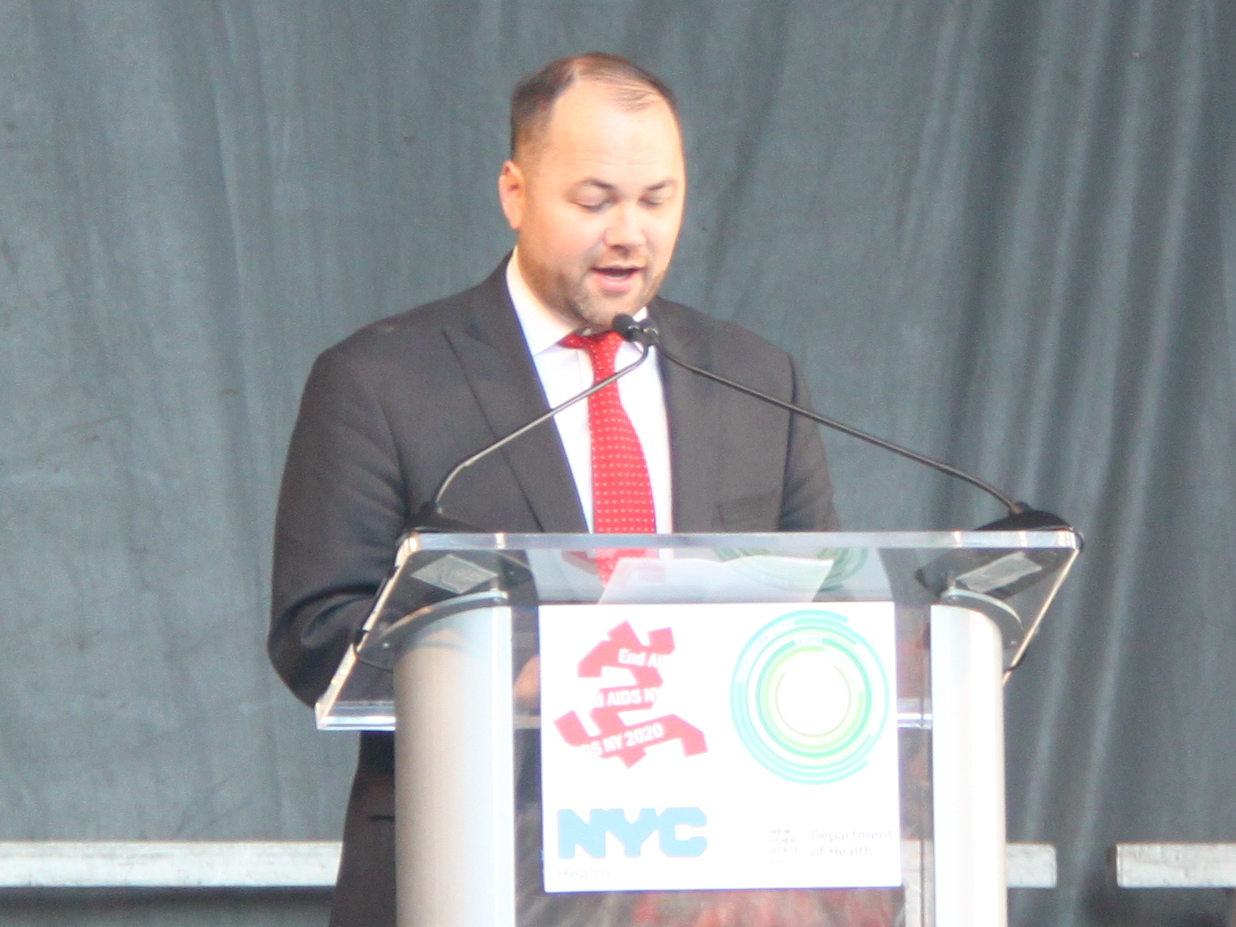
Johnson in 2016

In 2013, Christine Quinn ran for mayor of New York City, as her term in the city council was expiring. Johnson, then chair of Community Board 4, ran to succeed Quinn in the 3rd district, and was elected in November 2013 with 86% of the vote. He took office in January 2014. Johnson's district includes all or part of the West Side neighborhoods of Chelsea, Hell's Kitchen, Greenwich Village, west SoHo, Hudson Square, part of the Upper West Side, Times Square, FlatIron, Hudson Yards, the Theater District, and the Garment District.

The council elected him speaker in January 2018. He was the first openly gay man to serve as speaker. He was the first Speaker to be born in Massachusetts. At the time, Johnson was also the only openly HIV-positive politician in New York State.

=== Health ===
As chair of the council's Committee on Health, Johnson oversaw hearings on health issues such as the proliferation in the city of synthetic marijuana, also known as K2. Johnson's legislation to require transparency regarding health services administered at Rikers Island was signed into law in June 2015.

In April 2016, Mayor Bill de Blasio signed into law Johnson's bill prohibiting the use of smokeless tobacco products, such as chewing tobacco, at sports stadiums and arenas that host events that require a ticket for admission. The legislation effectively banned chewing tobacco from professional baseball in New York City. A similar ban had previously been enacted in San Francisco, Boston, Los Angeles, and Chicago. New York Yankees pitcher Andrew Miller noted: "It's a completely legal substance. It's available to purchase at any 7-Eleven", and his teammate third baseman Chase Headley wondered, "How is it legal around town, around wherever else, but just at the ballpark it's not?" New York Mets outfielder Curtis Granderson said, "The only question we have is, the guys who do it, how do they know what's going on? ... if a player accidentally chooses to do it, will he get a citation? Will we stop the game? And will the same thing happen to the fans in attendance? That hasn't been identified yet, so we're still waiting to hear that."

In 2017 Johnson along with others occupied the offices in the U.S. Capitol of Senate Republicans to protest efforts to repeal the Affordable Care Act, and was arrested and zip-tied. During the protest, Johnson screamed: "'ACT UP!' 'Fight back!'". He later tweeted, "By occupying offices of Senate Republicans, we demand they cease attempts to strip health care from millions!" He was charged with "misdemeanor incommoding, a District of Columbia statute that prohibits demonstrations inside the Capitol complex."

=== Criminal justice reform ===
In August 2016, the City Council passed legislation introduced by Johnson and Council Speaker Melissa Mark-Viverito to create a city office responsible for the coordination of social and healthcare services for ex-cons who have been released from the New York City Department of Correction system.

In 2018, Johnson sponsored a new law requiring that inmates in New York City jails be provided with free telephone calls. At the time, poor inmates were already given three free calls per week, and sentenced inmates were given two free calls a week, but under the new law all inmate calls are free of charge.

In May 2020, during the COVID-19 pandemic, Johnson called for the New York Police Department to stop making low-level arrests. He also called for the police to stop executing bench warrants for failure to appear in court.

Johnson supports making it legal for sex workers to provide sexual services, but not for their clients to be free from criminal prosecution. He supports the Defund the Police movement.

=== LGBT rights ===
In 2014 Johnson introduced legislation to remove surgical requirements for transgender New Yorkers to change the gender on their birth certificates. The legislation passed the City Council in December 2014 and was adopted in January 2015.

In June 2019, to mark the 50th anniversary of the Stonewall riots, sparking the start of the modern LGBTQ rights movement, Queerty named Johnson one of the Pride50 "trailblazing individuals who actively ensure society remains moving towards equality, acceptance and dignity for all queer people".

During the COVID-19 pandemic in New York City, in 2020 a 68-bed field hospital was run by Samaritan's Purse and Mount Sinai Hospital in Central Park. Johnson spoke out against it, due to the evangelical Christian aid group's requirement that their employees commit to a statement of faith, including a traditional view of marriage and sexuality. The charity's CEO Franklin Graham said, "we have never asked any of the millions of people we have served to subscribe to anything. In other words, as a religious charity, while we lawfully hire staff who share our Christian beliefs, we do not discriminate in who we serve." The field hospital was dismantled in May 2020. It had treated over 300 patients. Mount Sinai eventually severed ties with the organization due to the protests against its participation.

=== Animal welfare ===
In 2014, Johnson and Council member Elizabeth Crowley introduced legislation to regulate the sale of pets in New York City, including bills to ban the sale of rabbits, require that pet shops spay or neuter dogs in their care, and ensure that known animal abusers are unable to obtain animals. The legislation passed in December.

In 2015, Johnson introduced legislation mandating that either fire sprinklers or supervision be present in all establishments that house animals for more than 24 hours.

In 2016, Johnson co-sponsored legislation by Council member Rosie Mendez to ban the use of wild animals and exotic animals in circuses for public entertainment, with exceptions for dog shows and camels for Manhattan's Radio City Christmas Spectacular. The bill was approved by the council in June 2017 and signed by de Blasio a month later.

In 2019, Johnson authored a bill to ban the sale of garments and accessories made with real animal fur. The legislation was supported by animal rights and welfare activists who argue that the fur industry is inherently cruel. It was opposed by the fur industry and prominent members of the Black and Jewish communities concerned about its impact on their cultural traditions.

=== Women's issues ===
Johnson's first legislation to pass the City Council was a bill granting a presumption of eligibility for people transitioning from domestic violence shelters to Department of Homeless Services shelters. The bill allows these individuals to bypass extensive intake procedures they already underwent during their first shelter placement.

=== Education ===
Johnson introduced legislation with Council member Vanessa Gibson to require the NYC Department of Education to report on the use of disciplinary measures in public schools. The legislation passed in September 2015, and was signed into law the following month. Johnson later introduced legislation requiring the Department of Education to regularly report on student health services in public schools, to ensure that such services are adequately serving students. De Blasio signed the legislation into law in February 2016.

=== Rent regulation ===
Johnson was the prime sponsor of legislation declaring a housing shortage emergency in 2015, which allowed rent stabilization laws to be extended. On June 3, 2015, he and others occupied the offices of Republican senators in Albany in an act of civil disobedience while protesting for the extension of rent regulation and the reform of New York's rent laws, and he was arrested and handcuffed, charged with disorderly conduct, and given a desk warrant. Fifty-five protesters were arrested for blocking the entrance to Governor Andrew Cuomo's office, and Johnson said that a number of protesters occupied Senate office buildings, which he said "shows how much is on the line". It was Johnson's fourth arrest for civil disobedience.

=== Transportation ===
In May 2015, the City Council passed Johnson's legislation requiring all heavy-duty vehicles in New York City's fleet to be equipped with side-guards, devices meant to reduce casualties that large trucks at times cause to pedestrians and cyclists. In December 2018 Transportation Alternatives gave Johnson its first-ever Vision Zero Leader of the Year Award.

=== Labor ===
In response to a growing trend of hotel rooms being converted into luxury condominiums, Johnson introduced legislation to limit the number of condo conversions hotel owners can make. The legislation's goal was to protect jobs in the hotel industry. The City Council passed it in May 2015 and it was signed into law the next month.

=== Environment ===
In 2018 Johnson supported a ban on plastic straws. In 2019 he supported a five-cent fee on paper bags and banning styrofoam food containers.

=== Election history ===
New York City Council: District 3
| Election | Candidate | Party | Votes | Pct | Candidate | Party | Votes | Pct |
|---|---|---|---|---|---|---|---|---|
| 2013 primary election | Corey Johnson | Dem | 12,538 | 63.28% | Yetta Kurland | Dem | 7,275 | 32.72% |
| 2013 general election | Corey Johnson | Dem | 23,608 | 78.3% | Richard Stewart | Rep | 3,691 | 12.2% |
| 2017 general election | Corey Johnson | Dem | 25,744 | 84.3% | Marni Halasa | Independent | 1,556 | 5.1% |

== 2021 campaigns ==
In 2019, Johnson began accepting contributions for a potential run for mayor of New York City. He stopped fund-raising in March 2020 and announced that he would not run in September 2020. He said he had had depression since May 2020, and did not think he could campaign and be effective as speaker while monitoring his mental health. In March 2021, he launched his run for the 2021 New York City Comptroller election, but lost the Democratic primary, 51.9%–48.1%, to Councilmember Brad Lander.

== Lobbying ==
=== While holding public office ===
Johnson was a real-estate lobbyist or government relations director at GFI Development from 2008 to 2010. Anna Sanders reported Johnson received around a tenth of his mayoral campaign donations from "people who work for or serve hundreds of entities that have gotten millions in discretionary funds from the Council"; Johnson denied allegations of pay-to-play. Sanders and other sources mention other close ties to lobbyists, especially the Kasirer lobbying firm, as one of its vice presidents, Jason Goldman, served as Johnson's deputy chief of staff.

=== Cojo Strategies ===
Soon after ending his campaign for mayor, Johnson moved to start a government relations consulting firm, Cojo Strategies, which began advising to a subsidiary of the Brooklyn Nets and the Central Park Conservancy. An Israeli tech firm hired Johnson as its United States government relations advisor, with a focus on New York. He will advise and "liaise with municipal and state officials".

Johnson represented Saferwatch, a company developing a "panic button" app who sought to provide it to schools in the City of New York. Johnson met in 2022 on the company's behalf with New York City Schools chancellor David C. Banks. The following year, the city engaged the Saferwatch app in a pilot program at five schools. Saferwatch ceased being represented by Johnson in early 2024, and hired the government relations services of Terence Banks, the New York City Schools chancellor's brother.

== See also ==
- LGBT culture in New York City
- List of LGBT people from New York City
- NYC Pride March

Political offices
| Preceded by Christine Quinn | New York City Council, 3rd district 2014–2021 | Succeeded by Erik Bottcher |
| Preceded by Melissa Mark-Viverito | Speaker of the New York City Council; 2018–2021 | Succeeded by Adrienne Adams |
| Preceded by Letitia James | New York City Public Advocate; Acting; 2019 | Succeeded by Jumaane Williams |
