= New York City Council =

Lawmaking body of New York City

Type
- Type: Unicameral
- Term limits: Two terms. See § Term limits.

Leadership
- Speaker: Julie Menin (D) since January 7, 2026
- Deputy Speaker: Nantasha Williams (D) since January 15, 2026
- Majority Leader: Shaun Abreu (D) since January 15, 2026
- Minority Leader: David Carr (R) since January 7, 2026
- Majority Whip: Kamillah Hanks (D) since January 15, 2026
- Minority Whip: Inna Vernikov (R) since January 7, 2026

Structure
- Seats: 51
- Political groups: Majority (46) Democratic (46) Minority (5) Republican (5)
- Committees: See standing committees
- Length of term: Four years.
- Salary: $148,500 (2024)

Elections
- Voting system: First-past-the-post (general elections); Ranked-choice voting (primary and special elections)
- Last election: November 4, 2025
- Next election: November 6, 2029
- Redistricting: NYC districting commission

Meeting place
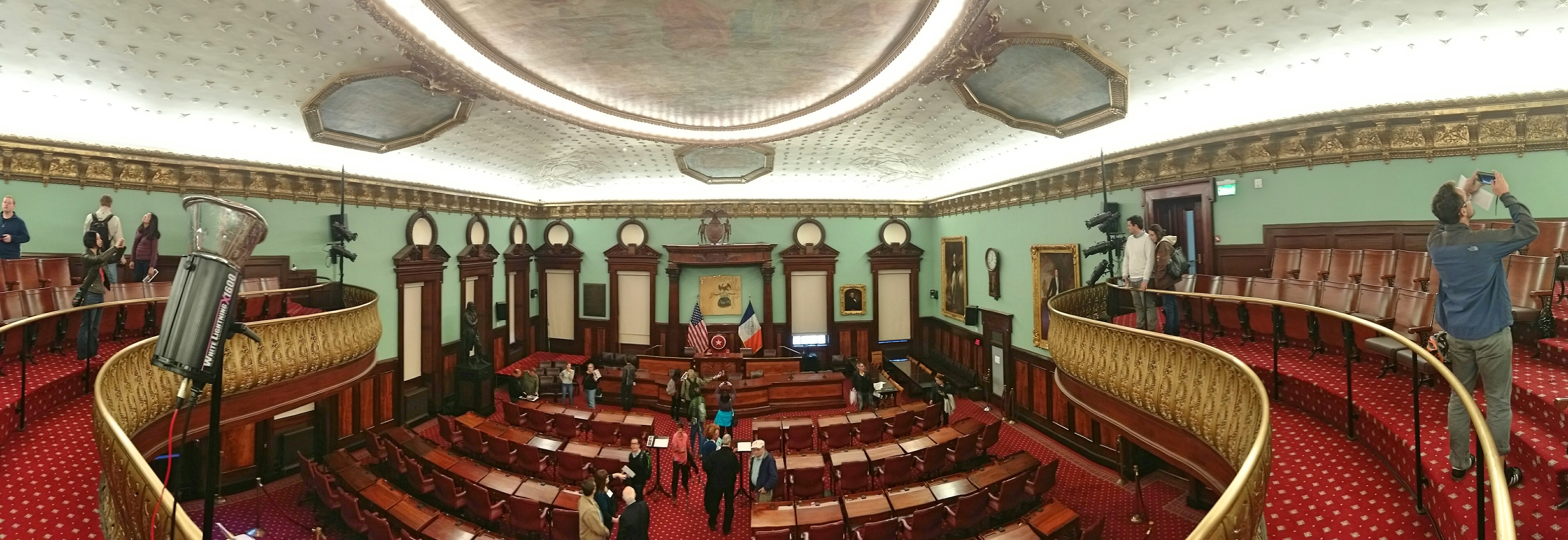
- New York City Hall

Website
- Official website

The New York City Council is the lawmaking body of New York City in the United States. It has 51 members from 51 council districts throughout the five boroughs.

The council serves as a check against the mayor in a mayor-council government model, oversees the performance of city agencies' land use decisions, and legislates on a variety of other issues. It also has sole responsibility for approving the city budget. Members elected are limited to two consecutive four-year terms in office but may run again after a four-year respite.

The head of the city council is called the speaker. The current speaker is Julie Menin, a Democrat from the 5th district. The speaker sets the agenda and presides at city council meetings, and all proposed legislation is submitted through the Speaker's Office. Majority Leader Kamillah Hanks leads the chamber's Democratic majority. Minority Leader David Carr was elected to lead the five Republican council members on January 28, 2025, however the vote was disputed due to a quorum not being present.

As of 2025, the council has 35 standing committees and 4 subcommittees, with oversight of various functions of the city government. Each council member sits on at least three standing, select or subcommittees (listed below). The standing committees meet at least once per month. The speaker of the council, the majority leader, and the minority leader are all ex officio members of every committee.

Council members are elected every four years. The exception is two consecutive two-year terms every twenty years to allow for redistricting after each national census (starting in 2001 and 2003 for the 2000 census and again in 2021 and 2023 for the 2020 census).

== Composition ==
An asterisk (*) next to the election year denotes a special election. A double asterisk (**) next to the election year means the member took office after certification to fill the remainder of an unexpired term.

District	Member	Party	Residence	Borough	Elected	Term limited	Map
1	Christopher Marte	Democratic	Lower East Side	Manhattan	2021	2029	Map
2	Harvey Epstein	Democratic	East Village	Manhattan	2025**	2033	Map
3	Carl Wilson	Democratic	Hell's Kitchen	Manhattan	2026*	2037	Map
4	Virginia Maloney	Democratic	Lenox Hill	Manhattan	2025	2033	Map
5	Julie Menin	Democratic	Upper East Side	Manhattan	2021	2029	Map
6	Gale Brewer	Democratic	Upper West Side	Manhattan	2021	2029	Map
7	Shaun Abreu	Democratic	Manhattan Valley	Manhattan	2021	2029	Map
8	Elsie Encarnacion	Democratic	East Harlem	The Bronx; Manhattan	2025	2033	Map
9	Yusef Salaam	Democratic	Central Harlem	Manhattan	2023	2033	Map
10	Carmen De La Rosa	Democratic	Inwood	Manhattan	2021	2029	Map
11	Eric Dinowitz	Democratic	Riverdale	The Bronx	2021*	2029	Map
12	Kevin Riley	Democratic	Co-Op City	The Bronx	2020*	2029	Map
13	Shirley Aldebol	Democratic	Throggs Neck	The Bronx	2025	2033	Map
14	Pierina Sanchez	Democratic	Fordham Heights	The Bronx	2021	2029	Map
15	Oswald Feliz	Democratic	Fordham	The Bronx	2021*	2029	Map
16	Althea Stevens	Democratic	Morrisania	The Bronx	2021	2029	Map
17	Justin Sanchez	Democratic	Melrose	The Bronx	2025	2033	Map
18	Amanda Farías	Democratic	Soundview	The Bronx	2021	2029	Map
19	Vickie Paladino	Republican	Whitestone	Queens	2021	2029	Map
20	Sandra Ung	Democratic	Flushing	Queens	2021	2029	Map
21	Shanel Thomas-Henry	Democratic	East Elmhurst	Queens	2025	2033	Map
22	Tiffany Cabán	Democratic	Woodside	Queens; The Bronx	2021**	2029	Map
23	Linda Lee	Democratic	Oakland Gardens	Queens	2021	2029	Map
24	James Gennaro	Democratic	Jamaica Estates	Queens	2021*	2029	Map
25	Shekar Krishnan	Democratic	Jackson Heights	Queens	2021	2029	Map
26	Julie Won	Democratic	Sunnyside	Queens	2021	2029	Map
27	Nantasha Williams	Democratic	Cambria Heights	Queens	2021	2029	Map
28	Tyrell Hankerson	Democratic	South Ozone Park	Queens	2025	2033	Map
29	Lynn Schulman	Democratic	Forest Hills	Queens	2021	2029	Map
30	Phil Wong	Democratic	Elmhurst	Queens	2025	2033	Map
31	Selvena Brooks-Powers	Democratic	Rockaway Beach	Queens	2021*	2029	Map
32	Joann Ariola	Republican	Howard Beach	Queens	2021	2029	Map
33	Lincoln Restler	Democratic	Greenpoint	Brooklyn	2021	2029	Map
34	Jennifer Gutiérrez	Democratic	Williamsburg	Brooklyn; Queens	2021	2029	Map
35	Crystal Hudson	Democratic	Prospect Heights	Brooklyn	2021	2029	Map
36	Chi Ossé	Democratic	Crown Heights	Brooklyn	2021	2029	Map
37	Sandy Nurse	Democratic	Cypress Hills	Brooklyn	2021	2029	Map
38	Alexa Avilés	Democratic	Sunset Park	Brooklyn	2021	2029	Map
39	Shahana Hanif	Democratic	Kensington	Brooklyn	2021	2029	Map
40	Rita Joseph	Democratic	Flatbush	Brooklyn	2021	2029	Map
41	Darlene Mealy	Democratic	Bedford Stuyvesant	Brooklyn	2021	2029	Map
42	Chris Banks	Democratic	East New York	Brooklyn	2023	2033	Map
43	Susan Zhuang	Democratic	Bensonhurst	Brooklyn	2023	2033	Map
44	Simcha Felder	Democratic	Borough Park	Brooklyn	2025*	2033	Map
45	Farah Louis	Democratic	Flatbush	Brooklyn	2019*	2029	Map
46	Mercedes Narcisse	Democratic	Canarsie	Brooklyn	2021	2029	Map
47	Kayla Santosuosso	Democratic	Bay Ridge	Brooklyn	2025	2033	Map
48	Inna Vernikov	Republican	Sheepshead Bay	Brooklyn	2021**	2029	Map
49	Kamillah Hanks	Democratic	Stapleton	Staten Island	2021	2029	Map
50	David Carr	Republican	Grasmere	Staten Island; Brooklyn	2021**	2029	Map
51	Frank Morano	Republican	Eltingville	Staten Island	2025*	2033	Map

Map of Council districts

Members
Borough	Population (2017 est)	Democratic	Republican	Total
Brooklyn	2,648,771	14	1	15
Queens	2,358,582	12	2	14
Manhattan	1,664,727	10	0	10
The Bronx	1,471,160	7	0	7
Staten Island	479,458	1	2	3
Total	8,008,278	46	5	51

Council leaders
Position	Name	Party	Borough
Speaker	Julie Menin	Democratic	Manhattan
Majority Leader	Shaun Abreu	Democratic	Manhattan
Deputy Speaker	Nantasha Williams	Democratic	Queens
Majority Whip	Kamillah Hanks	Democratic	Staten Island
Minority Leader	David Carr	Republican	Staten Island & Brooklyn
Minority Whip	Inna Vernikov	Republican	Brooklyn

== Salary ==
Council members currently receive $148,500 a year in base salary, which the council increased from $112,500 in early 2016. The salary raise came with new ethics guidelines and restrictions; most outside income is prohibited, and members no longer receive additional compensation for serving on committees.

== Law ==
The New York City Charter is the fundamental law of the government of New York City including the council. The New York City Administrative Code is the codification of the laws promulgated by the council and is composed of 29 titles. The regulations promulgated by city agencies pursuant to law are contained in the Rules of the City of New York in 71 titles.

A local law has a status equivalent with a law enacted by the legislature (subject to certain exceptions and restrictions), and is superior to the older forms of municipal legislation such as ordinances, resolutions, rules and regulations. Each local government must designate a newspaper of notice to publish or describe its laws. The secretary of state is responsible for publishing local laws as a supplement to the Laws of New York (the "session laws" of the state), but they have not done so in recent years. The New York City Charter, the New York City Administrative Code, and the Rules of the City of New York are published online by the New York Legal Publishing Corp. under contract with the New York City Law Department.

== History ==
The history of the New York City Council can be traced to Dutch colonial times when New York City was known as New Amsterdam. On February 2, 1653, the town of New Amsterdam, founded on the southern tip of Manhattan Island in 1625, was incorporated as a city under a charter issued by the Dutch West India Company. A Council of Legislators sat as the local lawmaking body and as a court of inferior jurisdiction. During the 18th and 19th centuries the local legislature was called the Common Council and then the Board of Aldermen. In 1898 the amalgamation charter of the City of Greater New York renamed and revamped the council and added a New York City Board of Estimate with certain administrative and financial powers. After a number of changes through the ensuing years, the present Council was born in 1938 under a new charter which instituted the council as the sole legislative body and the New York City Board of Estimate as the chief administrative body. Certain functions of the council, however, remained subject to the approval of the board.

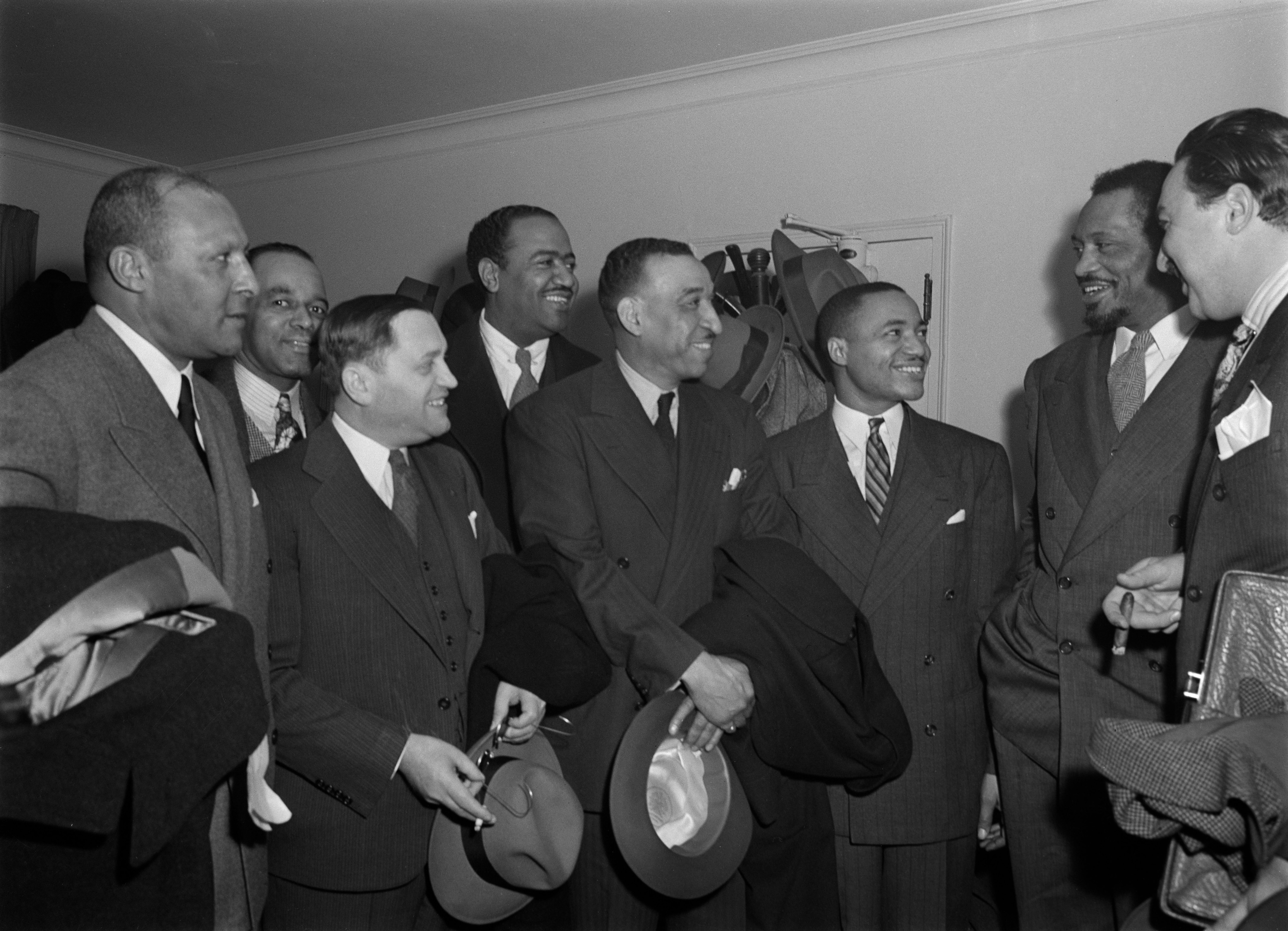
New York City Councilmen Peter V. Cacchione (third from left), Benjamin J. Davis Jr. (fourth from left) and Adam Clayton Powell Jr. (far right) among members of an anti-color line delegation to Major League Baseball, December 3, 1943

In 1938, a system of proportional representation known as single transferable vote was adopted; a fixed quota of 75,000 votes was set, so that the size of the council fluctuated with voter turnout. The term was extended to four years in 1945 to coincide with the term of the mayor. Proportional representation was abolished in 1947, largely from pressure from Democrats, who played on fears of Communist council members being elected (two, Peter V. Cacchione and Benjamin J. Davis Jr., already had). It was replaced by a system of electing one council member from each New York State Senate district within the city. The Charter also provided for the election of two council members-at-large from each of the five boroughs. In June 1983, however, a federal court ruled that the 10 at-large seats violated the United States Constitution's one-person, one-vote mandate.

In 1989, the U.S. Supreme Court held that the Board of Estimate's structure was inconsistent with the Equal Protection Clause of the Fourteenth Amendment because, although the boroughs had widely disparate populations, each had equal representation on the board. In response, the new Charter abolished the Board of Estimate and provided for the redrawing of the council district lines to increase minority representation on the council. It also increased the number of Council Members from 35 to 51. The council was then granted full power over the municipal budget, as well as authority over zoning, land use and franchises. In 1993 the New York City Council voted to rename the position of president of the city council to the public advocate. As the presiding officer, the public advocate was an ex officio member of all committees in the council, and in that capacity had the right to introduce and co-sponsor legislation. However the city charter revision of 2002 transferred the duties of presiding officer from the public advocate to the council speaker; the public advocate remains a non-voting member of the council.

The City Council's website includes a Legislative Resource Center, powered by Granicus's Legistar software, which allows the public to browse and search legislation, hearing calendars, and related documents. In 2017, after several years of requests from local activists and from Councilmember Ben Kallos, the City Council started allowing members of the public to access its Legistar instance's data via a web API.

In 2022, the composition of first female majority City Council included the first Muslim woman, the first South Asian members, and the first openly gay Black woman.

=== Term limits ===
A two-term limit was imposed on city council members and citywide elected officials in a 1993 referendum. The movement to introduce term limits was led by Ronald Lauder, the heir to the Estée Lauder fortune. In 1996, voters turned down a council proposal to extend term limits. Lauder spent $4 million on the two referendums.

However, in 2008, under pressure from Mayor Michael Bloomberg (who, like many Council members, was facing the end of his two-term limit at that time), the council voted 29–22 to extend the limit to three terms; the council also defeated (by a vote of 22–28, with one abstention) a proposal to submit the issue to public referendum.

Legal challenges to the extension of term limits failed in federal court. The original decision by Judge Charles Sifton of the United States District Court for the Eastern District of New York (Long Island, Brooklyn, Queens and Staten Island) was upheld by a three-judge panel of the United States Court of Appeals for the Second Circuit (Vermont, Connecticut and New York), and a proposal in the New York State Legislature to override the extension was not passed.

Voters voted to reinstate the two-term limit law in another referendum in 2010. However, according to The New York Times, incumbent members of the city council who were elected prior to the 2010 referendum "will still be allowed to run for a third term. People in office before 2010 were eligible for three terms."

== Presiding officers since 1898 ==
Through several changes in title and duties, this person has been, together with the mayor and city comptroller, one of the three municipal officers directly elected by all of the city's voters, and also the person who—when the elected mayor resigns, dies, or otherwise loses the ability to serve—becomes acting mayor until the next special or regular election.

Until 1989, these three officers, together with the five borough presidents, constituted the New York City Board of Estimate. Political campaigns have traditionally tried to balance their candidates for these three offices to appeal as wide a range of the city's political, geographical, social, ethnic and religious constituencies as possible (and, when possible, to both genders).

Name	Start and end dates as presiding officer	Party	Reason for end of term
As president of the city council
Randolph Guggenheimer	January 1, 1898 – December 31, 1901	Democratic	Did not seek re-election
As president of the board of aldermen
Charles V. Fornes	January 1, 1902 – December 31, 1903	Fusion (first term)	Elected to two two-year terms
Charles V. Fornes	January 1, 1904 – December 27, 1905	Democratic (second term)	Did not seek re-election
Patrick F. McGowan	December 27, 1905 – December 31, 1909	Democratic	Did not seek re-election, appointed to several Board of Education committees
John Purroy Mitchel ^{b, c}	January 1, 1910 – June 7, 1913	Fusion	Resigned to become Collector of the Port of New York
Ardolph L. Kline ^{a, d}	June 9, 1913 – December 31, 1913	Republican	Re-elected to aldermanic seat but did not seek re-election as aldermanic president
George McAneny	January 1, 1914 – February 1, 1916	Fusion, Democratic	Resigned to join the management of The New York Times
Frank L. Dowling	February 1, 1916 – December 31, 1917	Democratic	Became Manhattan Borough President
Alfred E. Smith	January 1, 1918 – December 31, 1918	Democratic	Became Governor of New York
Robert L. Moran	January 1, 1919 – December 31, 1919	Democratic	Lost re-election to La Guardia
Fiorello H. La Guardia ^{b, c}	January 1, 1920 – December 31, 1921	Republican	Unsuccessful run for mayor, lost in the primary
Murray Hulbert	January 2, 1922 – January 8, 1925	Democratic	Ousted by court decision after accepting honorary position on the Finger Lakes Park Commission
William T. Collins	January 8, 1925 – December 30, 1925	Democratic	Became acting mayor for one day, then became New York County Clerk
Joseph V. McKee ^{a, c}	January 1, 1926 – May 15, 1933	Democratic	Resigned to become president of the Title Guarantee and Trust Company
Dennis J. Mahon (acting)	May 16, 1933 – December 31, 1933	Democratic	Lost re-election to Republican-Fusion candidate Morton Baum
Bernard S. Deutsch	January 1, 1934 – November 21, 1935	Republican, Fusion, Law Preservation	Died while in office
Timothy J. Sullivan	November 22, 1935 – December 31, 1936	Democratic	Re-elected to aldermanic seat but did not seek re-election as aldermanic president
William F. Brunner	January 1, 1937 – December 31, 1937	Democratic	Unsuccessful run for Queens Borough President
As president of the city council
Newbold Morris ^{c}	December 31, 1937 – January 1, 1946	Republican	Unsuccessful run for mayor, lost in general election to William F. O'Dwyer
Vincent Impellitteri ^{a, b}	January 1, 1946 – August 31, 1950	Democratic	Became Mayor upon O'Dwyer's resignation
Joseph T. Sharkey (acting)	September 2, 1950 – November 14, 1951	Democratic	Acting president until Election Day results were certified
Rudolph Halley ^{c}	November 14, 1951 – December 31, 1953	Liberal, Fusion, Independent Citizens	Unsuccessful run for mayor, lost in general election to Robert F. Wagner Jr.
Abe Stark	January 1, 1954 – December 31, 1961	Democratic	Became Brooklyn Borough President
Paul R. Screvane	January 1, 1962 – December 31, 1965	Democratic, Liberal, Brotherhood	Unsuccessful run for mayor, lost in the primary to Abraham D. Beame
Frank D. O'Connor	January 1, 1966 – January 3, 1969	Democratic	Resigned to become a New York Supreme Court justice
Francis X. Smith	January 8, 1969 – December 31, 1969	Democratic	Ran for re-election, lost to Garelik
Sanford Garelik	January 1, 1970 – December 31, 1973	Republican, Liberal	Ran for re-election as a Democrat, lost in primary to O'Dwyer
Paul O'Dwyer	January 1, 1974 – December 31, 1977	Democratic	Ran for re-election, won Democratic primary, then lost the run-off to Bellamy
Carol Bellamy ^{c}	January 1, 1978 – December 31, 1985	Democratic	Unsuccessful run for mayor, lost to Edward I. Koch
Andrew Stein	January 1, 1986 – December 31, 1993	Democratic, Liberal	Ran for mayor and then Public Advocate, dropped out of both races
As Public Advocate
Mark Green ^{c}	January 2, 1994 – December 31, 2001	Democratic	Ran for mayor, lost general election to Michael Bloomberg
Betsy Gotbaum	January 1, 2002 – December 31, 2009	Democratic	Did not seek re-election
Bill de Blasio	January 1, 2010 – December 31, 2013	Democratic	Did not seek re-election, elected Mayor
Letitia James	January 1, 2014 – December 31, 2018	Democratic	Resigned to take office as Attorney General of New York
Corey Johnson (acting)	January 1, 2019 – March 18, 2019	Democratic	Did not contest special election
Jumaane Williams	March 19, 2019 – Present	Democratic	Incumbent
As Speaker of the city council
Peter Vallone Sr.	January 8, 1992 – December 31, 2001	Democratic	Term limits
Gifford Miller	January 9, 2002 – December 31, 2005	Democratic	Term limits, ran for mayor and lost in the primary
Christine Quinn	January 4, 2006 – December 31, 2013	Democratic	Term limits, ran for mayor and lost in the primary
Melissa Mark-Viverito	January 8, 2014 – December 31, 2017	Democratic	Term limits
Corey Johnson	January 3, 2018 – December 31, 2021	Democratic	Term limits, ran for Comptroller and lost in the primary
Adrienne Adams	January 5, 2022 – December 31, 2025	Democratic	Term limits, ran for mayor and lost in primary
Julie Menin	January 7, 2026 - Present	Democratic	Incumbent

=== Notes ===
a. Became acting mayor upon the death or resignation of the elected mayor.
b. Later won election as mayor.
c. Unsuccessful candidate for mayor in a subsequent general election.
d. Not elected by citywide popular vote (Ardolph Kline had been elected deputy president by his fellow aldermen, and then succeeded as president upon Mitchel's resignation).

== Standing committees ==
- Committee on Aging (Chair: Susan Zhuang)
  - Subcommittee on Senior Centers and Food Security (Chair: Darlene Mealy)
- Committee on Children and Youth (Chair: Althea Stevens)
- Committee on Civil and Human Rights (Chair: Sandy Nurse)
- Committee on Civil Service and Labor (Chair: Shirley Aldebol)
- Committee to Combat Hate (Chair: Yusef Salaam)
- Committee on Consumer and Worker Protection (Chair: Harvey Epstein)
- Committee on Contracts (Chair: Lincoln Restler)
- Committee on Criminal Justice (Chair: Selvena Brooks-Powers)
- Committee on Cultural Affairs, Libraries & International Intergroup Relations (Chair: Nantasha Williams)
- Committee on Disabilities (Chair: Shahana K. Hanif)
- Committee on Economic Development (Chair: Virginia Moloney)
- Committee on Education (Chair: Eric Dinowitz)
  - Subcommittee on Early Childhood Education (Chair: Jennifer Guitérrez)
- Committee on Environmental Protection, Resiliency & Waterfronts (Chair: James F. Gennaro)
- Committee on Finance (Chair: Linda Lee)
- Committee on Fire & Emergency Management (Chair: Joann Ariola)
- Committee on General Welfare (Chair: Crystal Hudson)
- Committee on Governmental Operations, State & Federal Legislation (Chair: Gale A. Brewer)
- Committee on Health (Chair: Lynn Schulman)
- Committee on Higher Education (Chair: Rita Joseph)
- Committee on Hospitals (Chair: Mercedes Narcisse)
- Committee on Housing and Buildings (Chair: Pierina A. Sanchez)
- Committee on Immigration (Chair: Elsie Encarnación)
- Committee on Land Use (Chair: Kevin C. Riley)
  - Subcommittee on Landmarks, Public Sitings, and Dispositions (Chair: Christopher Marte)
  - Subcommittee on Zoning and Franchises (Chair: Farah N. Louis)
- Committee on Mental Health and Substance Use (Chair: Tiffany L. Cabán)
- Committee on Oversight and Investigations (Chair: Shekar Krishnan)
- Committee on Parks and Recreation (Chair: Ty Hankerson)
- Committee on Public Housing (Chair: Chris Banks)
- Committee on Public Safety (Chair: Oswald J. Feliz)
- Committee on Rules, Privileges, Elections, Standards and Ethics (Chair: Sandra Ung)
- Committee on Sanitation and Solid Waste Management (Chair: Justin E. Sanchez)
- Committee on Small Business (Chair: Shanel Thomas-Henry)
- Committee on Technology (Chair: Carmen De La Rosa)
- Committee on Transportation and Infrastructure (Chair: Shaun Abreu)
- Committee on Veterans (Chair: Frank Morano)
- Committee on Women and Gender Equity (Chair: Amanda C. Farías)
- Committee on Workforce Development (Chair: Julie Won)

== Caucuses ==
According to the council's website, there are a number of caucuses in the council, wherein members who self-identify with the caucus purported community may be members:

- Animal Welfare Caucus
- Black, Latino and Asian (BLA) Caucus
- Common-Sense Caucus
- Irish Caucus
- Italian Caucus
- Jewish Caucus
- LGBQIA+ Caucus
- Progressive Caucus
- Women's Caucus

== See also ==
- Government of New York City
- Mayor of New York City
- New York City Civil Court
- New York City Criminal Court
- La Guardia and Wagner Archives
