= Declan Kelly (businessman) =

Irish-American executive (born 1968)

United States Special Envoy for Northern Ireland
- In office September 2009 – May 2011
- President: Barack Obama
- Preceded by: Paula Dobriansky
- Succeeded by: Gary Hart (2014)

Personal details
- Born: 1968 (age 57–58) Portroe, County Tipperary, Ireland
- Citizenship: Irish-American
- Relatives: Alan Kelly (brother)
- Education: National University of Ireland
- Occupation: Business executive, entrepreneur, journalist
- Years active: 1989–present
- Organization: The Consello Group, Teneo
- Website: www.consello.com/people/declan-kelly/

Declan Kelly (born 1968) is an Irish-American business executive, entrepreneur, and philanthropist. He is the founder, Chairman and CEO of The Consello Group, a specialized investing and financial services platform. Kelly is best known as the founder, former chairman and CEO of Teneo, an international consulting company based in New York City.

== Overview ==
Kelly started his career in the 1980s and 1990s reporting for The Nenagh Guardian, the Tipperary Star, and the Cork Examiner, and in 1994 he received the AT Cross Business Journalist of The Year Award. He afterwards worked in management for Irish communications companies such as FleishmanHillard, and in 1999 he founded his own business, Gallagher and Kelly Public Relations. Selling that firm to Financial Dynamics (FD) in 2000, he subsequently moved to the United States and began consulting for companies such as General Electric, Coca-Cola and Dell. When FD was sold to FTI Consulting for US$340 million, Kelly became FTI's executive vice-president and chief integration officer.

In 2007 and 2008 he was a leading adviser to Hillary Clinton during her presidential campaign, and in 2009 Clinton appointed him US Economic Envoy to Northern Ireland. During his two-year tenure he worked closely with Invest NI and on the US-Northern Ireland Investment Conference, and was praised for bringing jobs to Ireland by politicians such as Peter Robinson, Martin McGuinness, and Owen Paterson. In June 2011 Kelly co-founded Teneo Holdings in New York, and the following year Irish Central dubbed Kelly "this Irish generation's Tony O'Reilly" for his work in international business. Kelly has served as an adjunct business professor at the NUI Galway and is involved with a number of non-profit and civic organisations, including the Sesame Workshop, the American Ireland Fund, Cooperation Ireland, and GOAL (USA). Currently serving as chairman of the American Associates of the Royal Academy of Arts, he also founded the Northern Ireland Mentorship Program for business graduates, and has been recognised with accolades such as the Ellis Island Medal of Honor. The American Irish Historical Society selected Kelly as the youngest-ever recipient of their gold medal in 2008, which is given to a person "deemed to have made a unique contribution to Irish American society."

== Early life and education ==
Declan Kelly was born in 1968 in Portroe, Nenagh, a village on the banks of Lough Derg in the Irish county of Tipperary. He was born to Nan and Tom Kelly. He recollects that his father, a labourer from Portroe, had been a "small farmer" who left school at the age of twelve to work. Kelly's parents made financial sacrifices to ensure that he and his brother, Alan, a future Cabinet Minister in the Irish government, received full educations. At the age of 16 Kelly began working for free as a "cub reporter" for The Nenagh Guardian, while also attending Nenagh CBS at the same time. At Nenagh CBS he competed as a hurler in the All-Ireland 'B’ Colleges final. While continuing to report during the day and study at night, Kelly attended the National University of Ireland in Galway, Ireland from 1986 until 1989, graduating with a bachelor's degree in English and law.

== Career ==
=== Journalism and early advising ===
Working for The Nenagh Guardian during his student years, after 1989 Kelly was hired to report for the Tipperary Star. He became a sports columnist and business reporter for the Cork Examiner in the mid-1990s, and in 1994 he received the AT Cross Business Journalist of The Year Award for his coverage of "an industrial relations crisis in the Irish government." Kelly afterwards held a number of senior management positions with Irish communications companies. In 1995 he became a senior consultant for Murray Consultants in Dublin, which at the time was Ireland's largest public relations firm. He was appointed to the board in 1996, and according to The Independent proved to be the "young protege of the boss, Jim Milton." In 1997 he left Murray Consultants to join the communications company FleishmanHillard, where he was appointed to the board of its Irish subsidiary.

In the mid-1990s, Kelly was president of the Nenagh Chapter of the Junior Chamber, and was secretary of the North Tipperary constituency of the Irish Labour Party.

In 1999 he founded his own business, Gallagher and Kelly Public Relations. His partner in the venture, Jackie Gallagher, had previously advised politician Bertie Ahern and has also worked with Kelly at FleishmanHillard. Kelly sold the firm to the communications company Financial Dynamics (FD) for US$15 million in 2000. Around 2000, he bought a pub in North Tipperary, in a joint-venture with a school friend.

Joining FD as a member of their senior management, he moved to the United States in 2001 and was appointed chairman of Financial Dynamics in Ireland in late 2002. Kelly was also appointed global head of business development for FD International, and in September 2002 he became chairman and CEO of Financial Dynamics USA. Kelly was part of the senior management team that "negotiated management buyout of FD International" in July 2003, with management purchasing the company for US$43.5 million.

=== FTI Consulting ===
In 2004 he was still president and CEO of FD in the United States, also managing the company's business dealings in Europe. By that time he had helped corporations such as "General Electric, Coca-Cola and Dell to burnish a positive image through the media." In September 2006, Kelly helped oversee the sale of Financial Dynamics to FTI Consulting for US$340 million, which at the time was the largest sum ever paid for a communications firm. At the same time he joined FTI Consulting Group Limited as their executive vice-president and chief integration officer in New York. At FTI he also served as the chairman of the FD US and Ireland divisions. While holding the roles until late 2009, Kelly was "responsible for the operational integration of the company's various businesses in more than 20 countries." Working with the 3,500-person business, he also had "responsibility for corporate strategy, global business development, global client management and all of the company's marketing and communications functions."

In 2007 and 2008 he served as "one of the leading advisers" to Hillary Clinton during her presidential campaign, also organising fundraising events for Clinton in New York, San Francisco, and Limerick. Explained the Irish Central, "he was often at her side during her election battle against Obama and became known as a fundraising wizard, personally raising millions and became a person the Clintons increasingly relied on." In July 2009 The Independent reported that Kelly was stepping down from his roles at FTI, despite the fact that Kelly had "been touted as a likely potential chief executive... But given his political experience, it was also expected that he could be tapped for some kind of political role. Kelly remained with FTI in a consulting capacity while observing a 2-year non-compete clause with the company.

=== Economic Envoy to Northern Ireland ===
In September 2009 Kelly was appointed economic envoy to Northern Ireland by US Secretary of State Hillary Clinton, promptly travelling to Belfast. In a meeting with the Northern Irish Enterprise Minister, Arlene Foster, Kelly asserted that his role would be "confined to economic matters only, and he would have no political function," unlike his predecessors Richard Haass, Mitchell Reiss and George Mitchell. During his tenure he worked closely with Invest NI on projects and events such as the US-Northern Ireland Investment Conference held in October 2010, which he organised. According to the BBC, he was also credited with "having a big impact as a member of the winning Derry bid team for UK City of Culture," with Derry later selected as City of Culture in 2013.

He resigned as US Special Economic Envoy to Northern Ireland on 11 May 2011, with the BBC reporting that Kelly "said he had achieved the goals he had set for himself and the time was right for him to move on." According to the BBC, in his two-year tenure he "helped to create hundreds of jobs," specifically 1,500, with American companies such as Seagate, Dow Chemical, GE Energy, the New York Stock Exchange, Euronext, Citi and Kana Software establishing new jobs in Northern Ireland. Hillary Clinton accompanied his resignation with a public statement praising his tenure, writing that "during his time as envoy, Declan has helped our friends in the Northern Ireland Executive and Assembly, Invest NI, and the business community make Northern Ireland one of the best per capita attractors of investment in the world." His tenure was also praised by Peter Robinson, Martin McGuinness, and later UK Secretary of State Owen Paterson.

=== Founding Teneo ===
From October 2009 until June 2011 Kelly worked as an independent contractor for FTI Consulting. At the end of June Kelly co-founded Teneo Holdings in New York with his long-term colleagues Douglas Band and Paul Keary. Kelly was the largest shareholder, taking on the roles of chairman and co-CEO. Band, a legal advisor to Bill Clinton, became co-CEO and president, while Keary took on the role of COO. It was announced that Teneo would comprise "a merchant bank, a private equity vehicle and an international consulting business." Explained Irish Central in 2012, "at its heart Teneo is essentially a global consulting firm and merchant bank that advises many of the world's largest companies on a wide-range of issues." Teneo was headquartered in New York's 601 Lexington Avenue building, with announced plans to open offices in Washington D.C., London, Dublin, and Toronto. Tony Blair and Bill Clinton were both announced as members of Teneo's advisory board, with Clinton later becoming a client and unpaid advisor to Teneo and its founders.

As of December 2011, Kelly was serving as an adjunct professor at the NUI Galway in their College of Business, Public Policy and Law. In the spring of 2012 Teneo added the division Teneo Intelligence, which through algorithms "aims to identify trouble spots around the world and analyse their potential effect on global markets." Teneo had 100 employees by June 2012, a number which had risen to 130 employees by August. Teneo had already signed a number of high-profile clients at its founding, and by the summer of 2012 clients included Coca-Cola and Donald Keough, among others. On 22 June 2012, Irish Central dubbed Kelly "this Irish generation's Tony O'Reilly" for his work in international business.

=== Recent years ===
In December 2014, New York private equity firm, BC Partners made a minority investment in Teneo. Thereafter, Teneo grew from operating 6 divisions to 12 divisions, also increasing its headcount both in the United States and internationally. In 2015 Teneo received information requests from the office of Senator Charles Grassley as part of a review into potential ethics issues with a State Department waiver granted to Huma Abedin, a Clinton top aide, allowing her to earn income outside the government. Kelly responded that Teneo was "committed to the highest ethical and professional standards," while Abedin "said her work arrangement was approved by State Department lawyers and that she did no work for Teneo involving the department, nor was she asked to." Abedin had additionally signed a contract pledging she would avoid conflicts with her State Department role when she took the adviser position. Though the issue was seen as controversial by Republicans, The Journal noted that there "was no evidence of any fundraising, donations, or services provided by Teneo executives to the State Department or Hillary Clinton during her time as Secretary of State."

By the summer of 2015 Teneo had advisors on staff such as former US senator George Mitchell, and in July 2015 FIFA hired Teneo. Teneo expanded throughout 2015, purchasing the agencies Blue Rubicon and StockWell in July and Pendomer Communications in October, doubling Teneo's employee count to about 500. As of January 2016, there was speculation in the press that Teneo would purchase APCO, a public relations firm with 600 staff headquartered in the United States. That month Teneo Holdings also expanded into Canada, resulting in Teneo employing 570 people. Kelly remains chairman and CEO of Teneo Holdings, and oversees all 12 operating divisions of the company. He has also been an advisor for companies such as New Mountain Capital, among others.

On June 25, 2021, Kelly's future with Teneo became unclear when it emerged in several news outlets, including The Wall Street Journal and Financial Times that GM terminated its $250,000 a month retainer due to Kelly's inappropriate, drunken behavior at a charity event. According to reports Kelly was 'drunk and engaged in nonconsensual touching of women at an event hosted by the charity Global Citizen in early May. Global Citizen removed Mr. Kelly from its board on May 3.

Several outlets reported that Kelly has ceded most of his duties at Teneo. The Irish Times reported that Kelly Mr Kelly told senior colleagues at the firm that he is handing some of his duties to others on the global management committee.

According to the Financial Times, Teneo leadership scrambled to hold a call to brief its UK-based senior advisers — a list that includes former home secretary Amber Rudd and former leader of the UK’s Conservative party William Hague — who had not previously been informed about the alleged misconduct. One person who attended said: “There was a call but it was just asking questions and no one had any answers.”

According to the New York Times, Kelly stepped down from his role as CEO as of June 28, 2021.

On February 10, 2022, the Financial Times reported that Kelly has founded a new company called Consello, which "focuses on investing, merchant banking, corporate development and mergers and acquisitions."

In May 2025, Kelly became a part-owner of English football club Salford City, as part of a consortium including former players David Beckham and Gary Neville.

== Philanthropy ==
Involved with a number of non-profit and civic organisations as either a philanthropist or a boardmember, Kelly has been particularly focused on Irish and Irish-American issues. In 2004 he joined the advisory board of New York University's Glucksman Ireland House, and as of 2009 he was chairman of the US Foundation Board at the National University of Ireland, Galway. As of 2012 he had raised "considerable sums" for the Clinton Foundation, as well as the American Ireland Funds and Our Lady's Children's Hospital in Crumlin. He has been on the board of the non-profit educational organisation Sesame Workshop since 2013, and he has also served on the board of directors for the American Ireland Fund, Cooperation Ireland, and GOAL (USA). In June 2015 he was appointed chairman of the American Associates of the Royal Academy of Arts. Kelly founded and continues to oversee the Northern Ireland Mentorship Program in partnership with the American Ireland Fund, which "enables young university graduates from Northern Ireland to spend a year working within several leading corporations in the United States." The stated goal of the organisation is to increase skill and experience in the Northern Irish workforce. In April 2020, he was executive producer of Together at Home, an online fundraising concert to mitigate the COVID-19 pandemic with performers including Elton John and Billie Eilish. On May 3, 2021, Kelly was summarily removed from the board of Global Citizen after he became inebriated at an event for the charity on May 2 and inappropriately touched up to six women without their consent.

== Accolades ==
Kelly has been recognised with a number of awards and accolades for his work in journalism, business, and philanthropy. In 1994 he was named the AT Cross Business Journalist of The Year, and in 2005 he was included for the first time in the Business 100 Awards sponsored by Irish America, which lists the "top one hundred Irish American businessmen in the US." Also that year the National University of Ireland, Galway gave Kelly their annual Alumni Award for Business and Commerce. The American Irish Historical Society chose Kelly as their youngest-ever recipient for their gold medal in 2008, which is given annual to "one person deemed to have made a unique contribution to Irish American society." The Queen's University Belfast awarded Kelly an honorary doctorate in 2011 for "his service to the community and economy of Northern Ireland," and later that year Irish America again named him to their annual Business 100 list. The National Ethnic Coalition of Organizations awarded Kelly the Ellis Island Medal of Honor in July 2012, and the following August Business and Finance named him to their annual Global 100 list.

== Personal life ==
Kelly has both Irish and American citizenship, and he maintains residences in both Portroe, Ireland and New York City with his wife Julia and their family. On February 2, 2020, Kelly was the subject of a viral video in which he was spotted fully asleep in his seat during the 1st quarter of Super Bowl LIV at Hard Rock Stadium. The video was viewed over 7 million times with many outlets labeling it "the world's most expensive nap."

== See also ==
- List of entrepreneurs
- List of NUI Galway people
