= Both/And: A Life in Many Worlds =

2021 memoir by Huma Abedin

- Author: Huma Abedin
- Subject: Autobiography
- Publisher: Scribner
- Publication date: November 2, 2021
- Pages: 544
- ISBN: 9781501194801

Both/And: A Life in Many Worlds is a 2021 memoir by Huma Abedin, longtime advisor and aide to Hillary Clinton.

== Synopsis ==
The book covers Abedin's childhood in Saudi Arabia, her Muslim faith, her time as an aide to Clinton and her relationship with former Democratic Representative and former husband, Anthony Weiner. Abedin also explores the multiple identities that have shaped her, in particular being born in Michigan and then raised in Saudi Arabia by a Pakistani father and an Indian mother.

In the book, Abedin describes being sexually assaulted by a U.S. senator; she does not give any clues as to his identity.

== Reception ==
Caitlyn Kim of NPR wrote: "For someone who has had to say 'No' to some powerful people and who is at her core a private person, she has no trouble putting limits to how much she shares in this memoir. Sure, there are some things everyone may be dying to know … but just because we want to know, doesn't mean we need to know."

Gaby Hinsliff of The Guardian praised the book, writing of Abedin's account during her time at the White House: "It's at this point … that some readers may wonder whether the author is almost too pure for her chosen world. But then, in her telling, so is half the White House." She wrote that Abedin's description of her relationship with Anthony Weiner was "like watching a horror film and screaming at the heroine not to go into the haunted house, while knowing that, of course, she will."
