= Huma Abedin =

American political staffer (born 1975)

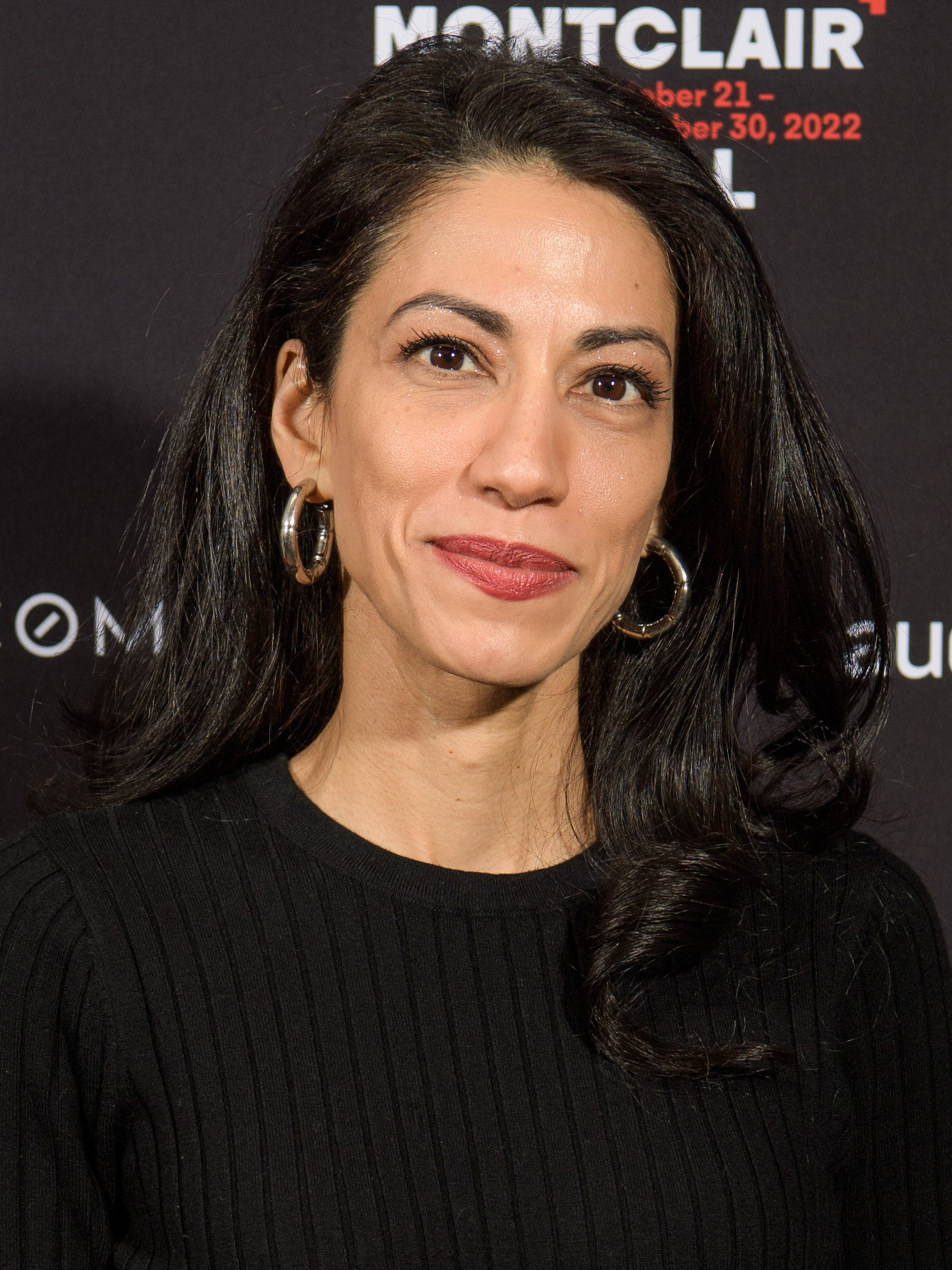
- Abedin in 2022
- Born: Huma Mahmood Abedin; July 28, 1975 (age 51); Kalamazoo, Michigan, U.S.
- Education: George Washington University (BA)
- Political party: Democratic
- Spouses: Anthony Weiner (m. 2010; div. 2025) Alexander Soros (m. 2025)
- Children: 1
- Relatives: S. M. Ahsan (great-uncle)

Huma Mahmood Abedin (born July 28, 1975) is an American political staffer who was chief of staff to former U.S. secretary of state Hillary Clinton. Abedin served as vice chair of Clinton's campaign for president of the United States in 2016. Before that, Abedin was deputy chief of staff to Clinton from 2009 to 2012 when Clinton served as U.S. secretary of state. She was also the travelling chief of staff to Clinton during her campaign for the Democratic nomination in the 2008 presidential election. Abedin is the author of the 2021 memoir Both/And: A Life in Many Worlds.

== Early life ==
Abedin was born on July 28, 1975, in Kalamazoo, Michigan, to Syed Zainul Abedin, a professor (Ph.D., American Literature), and his wife Saleha Mahmood Abedin, also a professor. Abedin is of Pakistani and Indian descent. She has two brothers and a sister.

When Abedin was two years old, her parents were offered jobs at the University of Jeddah in Saudi Arabia. Abedin moved with her family to Jeddah where she was raised and lived until returning to the United States for college. Abedin traveled frequently during her childhood and teenage years, and attended a British girls' school. Her father died from progressive renal failure when she was 17.

At George Washington University, she earned a Bachelor of Arts as a journalism major with a minor in political science.

== Career ==
=== Early career ===
While a student at George Washington University, Abedin began working as an intern in the White House in 1996, assigned to then-First Lady Hillary Clinton. From 1996 to 2008, she was an assistant editor of the Journal of Muslim Minority Affairs. For several years, she served as the back-up to Clinton's personal aide. She officially took over as Clinton's aide and personal advisor during Clinton's successful 2000 U.S. Senate campaign in New York and later worked as traveling chief of staff and "body woman" during Clinton's unsuccessful campaign for the 2008 Democratic presidential nomination. According to a number of Clinton associates, Abedin is a trusted advisor to Clinton on the Middle East, and has become known for that expertise.

=== 2009–2015: State Department, Clinton Foundation, Teneo ===
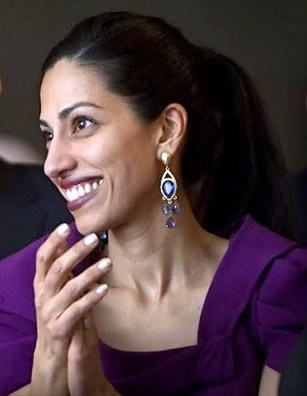
Abedin in October 2010

In 2009, Abedin was appointed deputy chief of staff to Clinton in the State Department. After returning from maternity leave in June 2012, she left her position as Clinton's deputy chief of staff and became a special government employee, a consultant role; this status allowed Abedin to work for private clients as a consultant while also serving as an adviser to the Secretary of State. Under this arrangement, she did consultant work for Teneo, a strategic consulting firm whose clients included Coca-Cola and MF Global, and served as a paid consultant to the Clinton Foundation, while continuing her role as body woman to Clinton. The New York Times reported that an associate of Abedin's said the arrangement also allowed her to work from her home in New York City rather than at the State Department's headquarters in Washington to be able to spend more time with her child and husband.

After leaving her post at the State Department in 2013, Abedin served as director of the transition team that helped Clinton return to private life, and continued her work for the Clinton Foundation. Eleven days before leaving the State Department, Abedin set up a private consulting firm, Zain Endeavors LLC.

=== 2016 presidential campaign ===
Starting in 2015, Abedin served as vice-chairperson for Hillary Clinton's 2016 campaign for president, while continuing to serve as personal assistant to Clinton. In her role as the campaign's vice-chairperson, she screened and interviewed applicants for key campaign roles, including campaign manager Robby Mook, and was the primary channel for communications with Clinton before the campaign officially began. After Republican presidential candidate Donald Trump proposed banning travel from Muslim countries into the United States, Abedin wrote an email to Clinton supporters calling herself "a proud Muslim" and criticized Trump's plan as "literally (writing) racism into our law books".

=== 2017–present ===
Abedin wrote a memoir titled Both/And: A Life in Many Worlds, published in November 2021. The book covers her childhood in Saudi Arabia, her Muslim faith, her time as an aide to Clinton and her relationship with her estranged husband, former Democratic Representative Anthony Weiner. She has said that writing the book was a therapeutic process, helping her work through a tumultuous time as a result of Weiner's multiple scandals. In the memoir, Abedin also explores the multiple identities that have shaped her, in particular being born in Michigan and then raised in Saudi Arabia by a Pakistani father and an Indian mother.

In the memoir, Abedin wrote that in the mid-2000s, an unnamed U.S. senator had "kissed me, pushing his tongue into my mouth, pressing me back on the sofa"; she wrote that she had "buried" the incident until accusations of sexual assault against Supreme Court justice Brett Kavanaugh in 2018 triggered her memory. In an interview with CBS News Sunday Morning to promote the book, she said she did not feel that the senator was sexually assaulting her in that moment.

As of May 2023, Abedin was Hillary Clinton's chief of staff.

== Inquiries, investigations, and allegations ==
=== Muslim Brotherhood allegations ===
Five Republican members of Congress (Michele Bachmann of Minnesota, Trent Franks of Arizona, Louie Gohmert of Texas, Thomas J. Rooney of Florida, and Lynn Westmoreland of Georgia) sent a letter dated June 13, 2012, to the State Department Inspector General. The letter claimed Abedin "has three family members—her late father, her mother and her brother—connected to Muslim Brotherhood operatives and/or organizations." The letter further alleged Abedin had "immediate family connections to foreign extremist organizations" which were "potentially disqualifying conditions for obtaining a security clearance" and questioned why Abedin had not been disqualified for a security clearance.

The Washington Post editorial board called the allegations "paranoid", a "baseless attack", and a "smear". The letter was also criticized by, among others, House Minority Leader Nancy Pelosi and Representative Keith Ellison, Democrat of Minnesota, the first Muslim member of Congress, who called the allegations "reprehensible". Senator John McCain, Republican of Arizona, also rejected the allegations. Bachmann's former campaign manager Ed Rollins said the allegations were "extreme and dishonest", and called for Bachmann to apologize to Abedin.

=== Outside employment while at State Department ===
Senate Judiciary Committee Chairman Chuck Grassley raised questions about Abedin's outside employment during her tenure as a State Department employee. While serving as a part-time aide to Clinton at the State Department, Abedin worked for the consulting firm Teneo Holdings (a consulting firm run by Douglas Band, a longtime aide to former president Bill Clinton), and for the Clinton Foundation; she was also employed as Hillary Clinton's personal assistant. The State Department and Abedin both responded, with the State Department indicating that it uses special government employees routinely "to provide services and expertise that executive agencies require", and Abedin stating that she did not provide any government information or inside information gained from her State Department job to her private employers. Grassley said he found the letters unresponsive. In July 2015, Grassley released information indicating that the State Department's inspector general had found that Abedin was overpaid by almost $10,000 for unused leave time when she left the government, resulting from violations of the rules governing vacation and sick leave during her tenure on the payroll as a Federal employee in the department. Abedin's attorneys said that she had learned in May that the Department's inspector general had found that she improperly collected $9,857 for periods when she was on vacation or leave, responded with a 12-page letter contesting the findings, and formally requested an administrative review of the investigation's conclusions. Her lawyer, Miguel Rodriguez, told The New York Times that the inspector general's report showed that Abedin worked during her maternity leave and had thus earned the pay.

In October 2015, a federal court in Washington, D.C., heard arguments on a Freedom of Information Act (FOIA) request by conservative watchdog organization Judicial Watch for records related to Abedin. Judicial Watch asked to make Abedin's emails and employment records public, requesting details of the arrangement under which she was designated a "special government employee", allowing her to also perform outside consulting work while on the federal payroll. On October 6, the State Department said it would be able to hand over 69 pages of emails in response to the FOIA request.

=== Hillary Clinton e-mail controversy ===
In 2015, emails by Abedin became part of the FBI investigation and controversy concerning Hillary Clinton's private email account while she was Secretary of State, resulting in various allegations by Republicans of violations of State Department regulations. Some officials within the intelligence community have stated that classified information was contained in e-mails from Abedin relating to the 2012 Benghazi attack and its aftermath, which had been sent through Clinton's private, non-government server. As of February 2016, 1,818 emails were found containing classified information on the private server; 22 of those were classified as Top Secret. They were not marked classified at the time they were sent, but they did contain classified information. Clinton's aides also sent and received classified information.

On October 28, 2016, shortly before the 2016 presidential election, the FBI announced that while investigating illicit text messages allegedly sent from Abedin's then-husband, Anthony Weiner, to a 15-year-old girl in North Carolina, they had discovered emails related to Clinton's private server on a laptop computer belonging to Weiner. FBI Director James Comey said the agency would review the e-mails to see if they contained classified material. Clinton called for the FBI to release its findings as soon as possible.

The FBI's New York field office was conducting the Weiner investigation and found Abedin's emails on the computer. They then stopped their work and contacted the team of investigators from FBI headquarters who had handled the probe of Clinton's private email server. The investigators saw enough of the emails to decide that they seemed pertinent to the Clinton server investigation and that they might be emails not seen before. Because they felt they needed a warrant specific to Abedin's emails, officials did not examine them further at that time. Abedin cooperated with the investigation, according to Justice Department and FBI officials. Abedin has stated that she does not know how her e-mails came to be on Weiner's laptop.

On October 30, 2016, the FBI obtained a search warrant for the Abedin-linked emails found on Weiner's laptop. Authorities indicated that Abedin used the same laptop to send thousands of emails to Clinton. On November 6, in a letter to Congress, the FBI said that, after reviewing all of Clinton's emails from her tenure as Secretary of State, it had not changed its conclusion reached in July exonerating Clinton.

Clinton went on to lose the election to Donald Trump on November 8, 2016. She later asserted that if the election had been held prior to the release of Comey's letter to Congress announcing the reopening of his investigation, she would have prevailed. Analyst Nate Silver opined that the Comey letter probably cost Clinton the election. Abedin addressed this issue in her 2021 memoir, Both/And: A Life in Many Worlds; after Comey's letter to Congress became public, she told Weiner that if Clinton were to lose the election, "'it will be because of you and me'".

=== House Benghazi Committee testimony ===
On October 16, 2015, Abedin testified in closed session before the House Select Committee on Benghazi, in a session that was expected to focus on the 2012 Benghazi attack during which Ambassador J. Christopher Stevens and three other Americans were killed. The committee had previously heard closed-door testimony from two other Clinton aides, Cheryl Mills and Jake Sullivan, in September 2015, and Clinton appeared before the panel in a public hearing on October 22.

The Republican-led committee's top Democratic representative, Elijah Cummings of Maryland, questioned the panel's decision to hear testimony from Abedin, arguing that her knowledge of details at the time of the attacks was minimal. Republican Representative Mike Pompeo of Kansas defended the decision to interview Abedin, saying: "Ms. Abedin was a senior official at the State Department at all of the relevant times. Every witness has a different set of knowledge." Before almost eight hours of testimony, Abedin said: "I came here today to be as helpful as I could be to the committee."

=== 2015 State Department subpoena ===
In February 2016, The Washington Post reported that the United States Department of State had issued a subpoena to the Clinton Foundation in the fall of 2015. According to the report, the subpoena focused on documents about the charity's projects that may have required approval from the federal government during Clinton's term as secretary of state; it also asked for records related to Abedin.

== Personal life ==
Abedin is a practicing Muslim. In addition to English and Urdu, Abedin also speaks fluent Arabic. Her great-uncle, Vice Admiral S. M. Ahsan, fought in World War II and was awarded the Distinguished Service Cross for his gallantry, later serving as the fourth Commander-in-Chief of the Pakistan Navy from 1966 to 1969.

Abedin started dating then-U.S. Representative Anthony Weiner in 2007, and they were engaged in 2009. They were married on July 10, 2010, with former U.S. President Bill Clinton officiating the wedding ceremony. In December 2011, Abedin gave birth to a boy. On August 29, 2016, Abedin announced her separation from Weiner after new sexting allegations were made against him. In early 2017, Abedin announced her intent to file for divorce with sole physical custody of their son. On May 19, 2017, after Weiner pled guilty, she filed for divorce. Abedin and Weiner withdrew their divorce case in January 2018, stating that they had decided to settle privately in order to spare their son further embarrassment. By November 2021, their divorce was reportedly in its final stages, although they raise their son jointly. Their divorce was finalized in early 2025.

Hillary Clinton has been described as a mentor and mother figure to Abedin. In 2010, at Abedin's wedding to Weiner, Clinton said: "I have one daughter. But if I had a second daughter, it would [be] Huma." During a trip that Clinton and Abedin made to Saudi Arabia, Abedin's mother said to Clinton, "Hillary, you have spent more time with my daughter than I have in the past 15 years. I'm jealous of you!"

In a May 2022 interview, Abedin said she struggles with anxiety and has been in therapy due to the shock and trauma of dealing with her husband's sexting scandal. She also said she had started dating again and felt excited about the process.

In the fall of 2023, Abedin met Alexander Soros, the second youngest son of George Soros, at a birthday party for a mutual friend. They began dating shortly afterwards and in July 2024, she announced her engagement to Soros. The pair wed on June 14, 2025. High-profile individuals in attendance included various Democratic political leaders, Hollywood celebrities and other individuals such as Anna Wintour.

== In popular culture ==
Abedin is featured in Weiner, a documentary about her former husband's unsuccessful 2013 campaign for Mayor of New York. In July 2022, Freida Pinto announced she would be developing and starring in a television series based upon Abedin's memoir. Abedin will be an executive producer of the program along with Emily Verellen.
