= Weiner (film) =

- Theatrical release poster
- Directed by: Josh Kriegman; Elyse Steinberg
- Produced by: Josh Kriegman; Elyse Steinberg; Julie Goldman; Christopher Clements; Carolyn Hepburn; Elizabeth Delaune Warren; Sean McGing
- Cinematography: Josh Kriegman
- Edited by: Eli B. Despres
- Production companies: Edgeline Films; Motto Pictures
- Distributed by: Sundance Selects Showtime
- Release dates: January 24, 2016 (Sundance Film Festival); May 20, 2016 (theatrical)
- Running time: 96 minutes
- Country: United States
- Language: English
- Box office: $1,702,489

Weiner is a 2016 American fly-on-the-wall political documentary film by Josh Kriegman and Elyse Steinberg about Anthony Weiner's campaign for Mayor of New York City during the 2013 mayoral election.

== Synopsis ==
The documentary follows congressman Anthony Weiner and his wife Huma Abedin, shortly after his 2011 resignation when scandalous photos of Weiner mysteriously appeared on his Twitter account. The photos led to a tumultuous spiral as more and more pictures of the congressman in various states of undress began to leak to the public. The documentary revolves around Weiner's attempted comeback from his initial resignation during his 2013 campaign in the Democratic Party primary for Mayor of New York City. His campaign goes well at first, with many New Yorkers willing to give him a second chance as evidenced in polls putting him at or near the top of a tight mayoral race.

During the filming of the documentary, however, additional leaked photos and evidence of online sexual activity surface, including explicit text conversations with women and a teenaged child that occurred well after his 2011 resignation from Congress. The mood of the campaign switches from exuberance to pain. Intimate views are captured of Weiner, his wife and his campaign staff struggling with the new revelations and the media firestorm that ensues. Weiner's wife, an adviser to Hillary Clinton, comes under fire during the scandal. The relationship between the couple becomes strained, and in a couple of instances, the camera is asked to leave the room. Weiner's campaign manager quits when a press conference is held in which Weiner comes clean about his sexting, and his campaign begins to take a downward spiral. Weiner comes in fifth place in the polls, garnering only 4.9% of the popular vote.

== People ==
People documented in the film include:

- Anthony Weiner
- Huma Abedin, his wife and a close aide to Hillary Clinton
- Sydney Leathers, one of Weiner's online sex partners, who attempts to confront him on election night
- Barbara Morgan, Weiner's communications director
- Camille Joseph, Weiner's campaign manager
- Amit Bagga, Weiner's senior advisor
- Maura Tracy, Weiner's senior staffer
- Andrew Noh, Weiner's campaign aide

The film also features archival footage from:

- Bill Clinton
- Stephen Colbert
- Hillary Clinton
- Bill de Blasio
- Jay Leno
- Jane Lynch
- Bill Maher
- Lawrence O'Donnell
- Barack Obama
- John Oliver
- Jon Stewart
- Donald Trump
- Howard Stern

== Release ==
The film premiered at the Sundance Film Festival in January 2016. It was released theatrically in the United States in May 2016 and broadcast on Showtime in October 2016. Starting in June 2014, the film began releasing internationally in the UK, Netherlands, Scandinavia, Australia, and Japan, and television broadcasts in Spain, Italy, France, Germany, Israel, Belgium, and Holland. The film received an R rating from the MPAA for language and some sexual material.

Upon release, Anthony Weiner declined to endorse the film and claimed he had no intention of ever seeing the final product, saying "I already know how it ends."

After the film was released, Weiner claimed that "Kriegman had assured him verbally and in emails that he would not use Abedin in the film without her consent", and that Abedin never granted permission for Kriegman to use the footage. When asked if he will sue the filmmakers, Weiner didn't give a definitive answer. The filmmakers disputed Weiner's claim, stating that they clearly "had consent from everyone who appears in the film, including Anthony and Huma."

== Reception ==
=== Critical reception ===
The film received near universal acclaim by critics. On the review aggregator website Rotten Tomatoes, 97% of 177 critics' reviews are positive, with an average rating of 8.2/10. The website's consensus reads: "Weiner uses sharp insight and untrammeled access to offer a portrait of a political and personal collapse that's as queasy as it is undeniably compelling." On Metacritic, the film has a weighted average score of 84 out of 100, based on 33 critics, indicating "universal acclaim".

Wendy Ide of The Observer gave it four out of five stars, writing: "Edited to perfection, this is like watching the slow-motion footage of a building collapsing. Weiner’s long-suffering wife, Huma Abedin … is a key sympathetic presence in the film. But it is Weiner himself, a likable narcissist with an Olympic capacity for vanity and self-delusion, who is every documentary-maker's dream subject."

Brian Lowry of CNN wrote: What Weiner makes painfully clear is the collateral damage of Weiner's actions, not merely on his wife but those who believed in and devoted their energy to his campaign. To that extent, it's possible to share his politics and still see him as a fatally flawed vessel for them.

=== Box office ===
The film performed decently, earning a worldwide box office total of $1,751,120 on an unknown budget. Of that $1,751,120, the film made $1,675,196 domestically and $75,924 internationally. On a per-theater average, the film made about $16,835 per screen.

=== Best of lists ===
- BuzzFeed 11 Best Movies of 2016
- Esquire Top 10 Documentaries of 2016
- The Hollywood Reporter - Critics' Picks: The 10 Best Documentaries of the year
- The Huffington Post 21 Best Movies of 2016
- IndieWire Best Movies of 2016
- GQ Best Movies of 2016
- Newsweek 21 Best Movies of 2016
- Thrillist Best Documentaries of 2016
- DC Outlook Top 10 Movies of 2016 (#1)

=== Accolades ===
Award	Category	Recipients and nominees	Outcome
Alliance of Women Film Journalists Awards	Best Documentary	Weiner	Nominated
American Cinema Editors Eddie Awards	Best Edited Documentary Feature	Eli B. Despres	Nominated
Austin Film Critics Association	Best Documentary	Weiner	Nominated
Australian Film Critics Association	Best Documentary Film (Local or International)	Weiner	Nominated
Awards Circuit Community Awards	Best Documentary Feature Film	Weiner	Nominated
British Academy Film Awards	Best Documentary	Weiner	Nominated
Central Ohio Film Critics Association	Best Documentary	Weiner	Nominated
Champs-Élysées Film Festival	Prix du jury	Weiner	Won
Chicago Film Critics Association Awards	Best Documentary	Weiner	Nominated
Chlotrudis Awards	Best Documentary	Weiner	Nominated
Cinema Eye Honors Awards	Outstanding Achievement in Nonfiction Feature Filmmaking	Weiner	Nominated
Cinema Eye Honors Awards	Outstanding Achievement in Editing	Eli B. Despres	Nominated
Cinema Eye Honors Awards	Cinema Eye Audience Choice Prize	Weiner	Nominated
Cinema Eye Honors Awards	The Unforgettables	Huma Abedin, Anthony Weiner	Won
Critics' Choice Documentary Awards	Best First Documentary (Theatrical Feature)	Josh Kriegman, Elyse Steinberg	Won
Critics' Choice Documentary Awards	Best Documentary Feature	Weiner	Nominated
Critics' Choice Documentary Awards	Best Political Documentary	Weiner	Nominated
Dallas-Fort Worth Film Critics Association Awards	Best Documentary	Weiner	Nominated
Denver Film Critics Society	Best Documentary Film	Weiner	Nominated
Detroit Film Critics Society	Best Documentary	Weiner	Nominated
Directors Guild of America	Outstanding Directorial Achievement in Documentary	Josh Kriegman & Elyse Steinberg	Nominated
Dublin Film Critics Circle Awards	Best Documentary	Weiner	Won
Florida Film Critics Circle Awards	Best Documentary	Weiner	Nominated
Gay and Lesbian Entertainment Critics Association	Documentary of the year	Weiner	Nominated
Georgia Film Critics Association	Best Documentary Film	Weiner	Nominated
Gotham Awards	Audience Award	Weiner	Nominated
Gotham Awards	Best Documentary	Weiner	Nominated
Grierson British Documentary Awards	Best Cinema Documentary	Weiner	Won
Hamburg Film Festival	Political Film Award	Weiner	Nominated
Houston Film Critics Society Awards	Best Documentary Feature	Weiner	Nominated
Indiana Film Journalists Association	Best Documentary	Weiner	2nd place
Indiewire Critics Poll	Best Documentary	Weiner	Nominated
Indiewire Critics Poll	Best First Feature	Josh Kriegman, Elyse Steinberg	Nominated
International Documentary Association	Best Feature	Weiner	Nominated
Iowa Film Critics Awards	Best Documentary	Weiner	3rd place
Jerusalem Film Festival	Best International Film	Weiner	Nominated
Las Vegas Film Critics Society Awards	Best Documentary	Weiner	Nominated
Montclair Film Festival	David Carr Award for Truth in Non-Fiction Filmmaking	Weiner	Won
Montclair Film Festival	Bruce Sinofsky Prize for Documentary Feature	Weiner	Nominated
New Hampshire Film Festival	Audience Choice – Documentary	Weiner	Won
North Carolina Film Critics Association	Best Documentary Film	Weiner	Nominated
North Texas Film Critics Association	Best Documentary	Weiner	Nominated
Oklahoma Film Critics Circle Awards	Best Documentary	Weiner	2nd Place
Online Film Critics Society Awards	Best Documentary	Weiner	Nominated
Phoenix Film Critics Society Awards	Best Documentary Film	Weiner	Nominated
San Diego Film Critics Society Awards	Best Documentary	Weiner	Won
Sarasota Film Festival	Special Jury Prize - Unprecedented Look at Politics in Crisis	Weiner	Won
Seattle Film Critics Awards	Best Documentary	Weiner	Nominated
St. Louis Film Critics Association	Best Documentary Feature	Weiner	Nominated
Sundance Film Festival	U.S. Grand Jury Prize – Documentary	Weiner	Won
Television Critics Association	Outstanding Achievement in News and Information	Weiner	Nominated
Utah Film Critics Association Awards	Best Documentary Feature Film	Weiner	2nd place
Village Voice Film Poll	Best Documentary	Weiner	Nominated
Washington D.C. Area Film Critics Association Awards	Best Documentary	Weiner	Nominated
Women Film Critics Circle Awards	Worst Male Images in a Movie	Weiner	Nominated
Zurich Film Festival	Best International Documentary Film	Weiner	Nominated

== Notes ==
1.Abedin and Weiner separated in 2017.

Awards
Preceded by The Wolfpack	Sundance Grand Jury Prize: U.S. Documentary; 2016	Succeeded by Dina
