= Anthony Weiner sexting scandals =

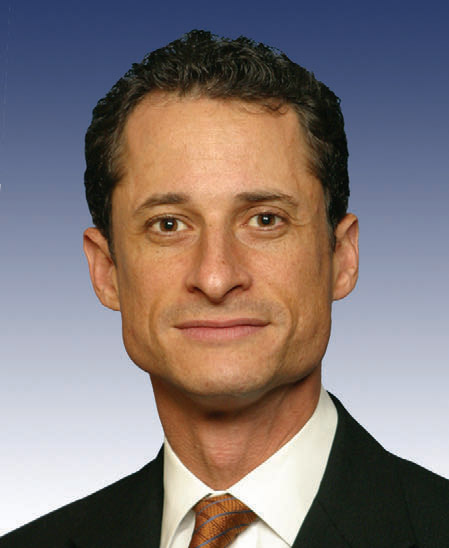
Anthony Weiner, Congressional portrait, c. 2007

Anthony Weiner is a former member of the United States House of Representatives from New York City who has been involved in multiple scandals related to sexting.

The first scandal began when Weiner was a Democratic U.S. Congressman. He used the social media website Twitter to send a link that contained a sexually suggestive picture of himself to a 21-year-old woman. After initially denying reports that he had posted the image, he admitted that he sent a link to the photo, which was described by Pittsburgh Post-Gazette on June 5, 2011, as an "erection barely covered by a man's underwear" and by iPolitics as a "man-bulge in boxer briefs". He also sent additional sexually explicit photos and messages to women before and during his marriage. He denied ever having met or having had a physical relationship with any of the women. On June 16, 2011, Weiner announced his intention to resign from Congress effective June 23.

Weiner returned to politics in April 2013 when he entered the New York City mayoral race. After additional pictures of Weiner were released, Weiner admitted sexting at least three women since his resignation from Congress. He remained in the race until the end, placing fifth in the Democratic primary.

Following a report from the Daily Mail in September 2016, the FBI investigated Weiner for sexting with a 15-year-old girl. His laptop was seized and emails related to the Hillary Clinton email controversy were found on it, causing a controversy late in the presidential election. On May 19, 2017, Weiner pled guilty to one count of transferring obscene material to a minor. His wife, Huma Abedin, filed for divorce prior to Weiner's guilty plea. In September, he was sentenced to 21 months in federal prison. He served his sentence at Federal Medical Center, Devens, in Ayer, Massachusetts.

== Initial media reports and Weiner's denial ==
On May 27, 2011, Weiner used his public Twitter account to send a link to a photo on yfrog. The picture of his erect penis concealed by boxer briefs was sent to a 21-year-old female college student from Seattle, Washington, who was following his posts on the social media website. Though the link was quickly removed from Weiner's Twitter account, screen shots of Weiner's original message and of the photo were captured by a user identified as "Dan Wolfe" on Twitter and subsequently sent to blogger Andrew Breitbart who published them on his BigGovernment website the following day. CNN described it as a "lewd photograph" of a "man bulge in ... underwear".

On June 1, 2011, Weiner gave a series of interviews in which he denied sending the photo and suggested that someone, perhaps a political opponent, had hacked into his accounts and published the photo. Weiner also said he could not say "with certitude" that the photo was not of him. He suggested that the image might be doctored, saying, "Maybe it did start being a photo of mine and now looks something different or maybe it is from another account." He did not ask the FBI or U.S. Capitol Police to investigate the incident but said he had retained a private security firm to look into this matter because he felt it was a prank, not a crime. Several bloggers accused Wolfe and Breitbart of planting the photo and message as part of a scheme to defame Weiner.

Evidence later revealed that a group of self-described conservatives had been monitoring Weiner's communications with women for at least three months. Two false identities of underage girls had been created by unknown parties to solicit communication with Weiner and the women he was contacting. Bloggers reported a tweet made in April by a 17-year-old Delaware girl in which she exclaimed, "Seriously talking to Representative Weiner from New York right now! Like is my life real?" In early June, Fox News Channel, whose reporter "happened to be there when the cops showed up", reported that police went to the girl's house to question her and her parents. The police, who had been "made aware of an alleged contact" between Weiner and the girl, also reviewed content on her computer. Weiner confirmed having communicated with the girl, but denied sending any inappropriate messages. The family of the girl stated the contact was "not salacious or in any manner inappropriate". The police did not find anything wrong in Weiner's communications with the girl. The entire incident was later dubbed "Weinergate".

=== Admission ===
On June 6, 2011, Breitbart posted a cropped, shirtless picture of Weiner that was obtained from a second woman on the Internet, and said that Weiner had sent more pictures of himself, including at least one that was sexually graphic. After this information had been made public, Weiner held a press conference in New York and apologized, saying, "I have not been honest with myself, my family, my constituents, my friends and supporters, and the media" and that, "to be clear, the picture was of me, and I sent it." After being prompted by reporters, he specifically apologized to Andrew Breitbart. He also said he had "engaged in several inappropriate conversations conducted over Twitter, Facebook, email and occasionally on the phone" and had exchanged "messages and photos of an explicit nature with about six women over the last three years". He added he had never met or had a physical relationship with any of them. He said he was "deeply ashamed" of his "terrible judgment and actions", which he called "very dumb".

When Weiner answered questions, he said that he had the continuing support of his wife Huma Abedin, who was a long-time aide to Hillary Clinton. He had married Abedin in July 2010 in a ceremony officiated by Bill Clinton, and he said that he did not intend to resign his congressional seat. Prior to his marriage, Weiner was known for his "bachelor exploits with some of New York's most eligible women," detailed in a 2011 Moment profile of the Congressman. Following the revelations of his inappropriate communications, his reportedly emotional apology to former president Clinton was referred to in the press as highly ironic. Asked about an allegation that he had engaged in phone sex with a woman in Nevada, Weiner neither confirmed nor denied the statement, saying that though he did not want to impinge the privacy of any of the women, neither would he contradict any of their statements. At his press conference, Weiner did admit that he had exchanged the reported sexting messages with his accuser.

=== Later events ===
During an appearance on SiriusXM radio on June 8, 2011, Breitbart showed hosts Opie and Anthony a photograph of what he claimed to be Weiner's nude genitalia. One of the cameras in the room caught the cell phone's display, and the hosts subsequently leaked the photo by publishing it on Twitter. Breitbart stated that the photo was published without his permission, and later told KFI radio, "These people have admitted that they did this surreptitiously and illicitly and they lied in the process saying that they didn't even have a camera in the place." Weiner's spokesperson issued the following statement: "As Representative Weiner said on Monday when he took responsibility for his actions, he has sent explicit photos."

News media also reported the identity of other Weiner's social media contacts, Lisa Weiss, a 40-year-old blackjack dealer in Las Vegas, and 28-year-old porn actress Ginger Lee who had exchanged sexually oriented messages with Weiner. On June 15, Ginger Lee held a press conference during which she said that when she requested advice from Weiner on how to respond to the media, he had advised her on June 2 that if they both stayed quiet the scandal would die down.

=== Political and constituent reaction ===
On the afternoon of June 6, 2011, House Minority Leader Nancy Pelosi called for an investigation by the House Ethics Committee to determine "whether any official resources were used or any other violation of House rules occurred". A number of Democratic and Republican congressmen called for Weiner's resignation. On June 7, Republican National Committee Chairman Reince Priebus called for him to resign, and challenged Pelosi to suggest the same. House Majority Leader Eric Cantor (R, VA) said he should resign, opining: "The last thing we need is to be immersed in discussion about Congressman Weiner and his Twitter activities." House Democrats who called for him to resign on June 8 included Representatives Allyson Schwartz (PA), Mike Ross (AR), Mike Michaud (ME), Niki Tsongas (MA), Larry Kissell (NC) and Joe Donnelly (IN).

On June 11, Nancy Pelosi, DCCC Chair Steve Israel, and DNC Chair Debbie Wasserman Schultz called for Weiner's resignation. Weiner requested and was granted a short leave of absence from the House to obtain professional treatment of an unspecified nature.

Two June 6 surveys of New York City adult residents provided conflicting results. A TV station NY1 and Marist College poll indicated that 51% believed Weiner should remain in Congress, 30% thought he should step down, and 18% were unsure. A WABC-TV/SurveyUSA automated survey found the city divided, with 46 percent who thought he should resign and 41 percent who thought he should stay in office. On June 9, a NY1-Marist Poll showed that 56% of registered voters in Weiner's Congressional District wanted him to stay in Congress, and 33% thought he should resign, with 12% uncertain. In the same poll, 73% said he acted unethically, but not illegally.

On June 13, White House spokesman Jay Carney said "The president feels... this is a distraction, as Congressman Weiner has said himself, his behavior was inappropriate; dishonesty was inappropriate." President Barack Obama said in an interview later that day that if he were Weiner, he would resign.

=== Resignation ===
On June 16, 2011, Weiner announced he would resign his seat in Congress. He made the announcement at a news conference in Brooklyn, at the same location where he announced his first campaign for New York City Council in 1992.

On June 20, Weiner formally submitted his letter of resignation from the U.S. House of Representatives, effective at midnight on June 21. His letter of resignation was read on the floor of the House of Representatives on June 23 and entered into the record.

In the special election held on September 13, 2011, to fill the vacant seat, the Republican candidate, businessman Bob Turner, defeated the Democratic candidate, State Assemblyman David Weprin.

== 2013 mayoral race and second scandal ==
In April 2013, the former congressman announced his return to politics as candidate for mayor of New York City. He soon became the front runner against Democratic primary-opponent City Council Speaker Christine Quinn.

On July 23, 2013, more pictures and sexting allegedly by Weiner were released by the website The Dirty. They were allegedly sent under the alias "Carlos Danger" to a 22-year-old unnamed woman with whom Weiner had contact in late 2012, and as late as April 2013, more than a year after Weiner left Congress. The woman's identity had yet to be confirmed. At a news conference that same day, with his wife Huma by his side, Weiner responded, "I said that other texts and photos were likely to come out, and today they have." He also said he would not drop out of the mayoral election for the City of New York.

The next day, Weiner's sexting partner's identity was confirmed as Sydney Leathers by CNN. Later The New York Times print edition called for Weiner to withdraw from the mayoral race in an editorial titled "Mr. Weiner and the Elusive Truth". In a joint NBC 4 New York/The Wall Street Journal/Marist Institute for Public Opinion poll taken that day, Weiner's favorability rating had dropped over 20 points, and he had lost the lead in the primary race to councilor Quinn, now leading him 25 to 16 percent.

On July 25, at a press conference in Brooklyn, Weiner admitted to sexting with three women in the months after his resignation from Congress, and that there had been six to ten women involved in total, not "dozens and dozens". Weiner's campaign manager Danny Kedem quit the weekend after the press conference.

Following the primary election on September 10, 2013, the press reported that Sydney Leathers, the young woman at the center of the second scandal, attempted to enter Weiner's campaign party that night, without an invitation. Weiner lost decisively in the election, finishing in fifth place with 4.9% of the vote.

== Criminal conviction and divorce ==
On August 28, 2016, the New York Post reported that Weiner had engaged in sexting with another woman, including sending a picture of himself in July 2015 with his toddler son sleeping next to him. The New York Times reported the next day that Weiner and his wife intended to separate. Weiner had served as a contributor to NY1, which put him on indefinite leave.

On September 21, 2016, the Daily Mail published an article claiming that Weiner had engaged in sexting with a 15-year-old girl. Devices owned by Weiner and Abedin were seized as part of an FBI investigation into the incident. Emails pertinent to the Hillary Clinton email controversy were discovered on Weiner's laptop, prompting FBI Director James Comey to reopen that investigation late into the 2016 US presidential election. On January 31, 2017, The Wall Street Journal reported that federal prosecutors were weighing whether to bring child pornography charges against Weiner over the incident. On May 19, 2017, The New York Times reported Weiner had surrendered to the FBI that morning, and under a plea bargain he intended to plead guilty to a single charge of transferring obscene material to a minor. Abedin reportedly filed for divorce prior to his guilty plea. On September 25, 2017, Judge Denise Cote of the Southern District of New York agreed to a plea agreement sentence totaling 21 months in federal prison, three years supervised release, and for Weiner to register as a sex offender. Weiner reported to Federal Medical Center, Devens on November 6. He was released from prison on February 17, 2019, and was ordered to register as a sex offender in April that year.

== In popular culture ==
The first scandal was used as the inspiration for part of the plot line of seasons 1–2 of the Showtime series Homeland, where Nicholas Brody (played by Damian Lewis) is invited to run for Congress (and subsequently gets elected) after the political career of "Congressman Dick Johnson" comes to a sudden end after his sexting pictures are publicized. An article in The Washington Post, noting that the Weiner story broke just in time for script purposes, quotes Alex Gansa, co-creator of Homeland: "We were looking for a way that our lead character could become a congressman in a very quick period of time. This presented itself on a platter." A Law & Order: Special Victims Unit episode titled "October Surprise", used the Weiner scandal as inspiration for a New York City mayoral candidate inappropriately texting with women online. Similarly to Weiner, the mayoral candidate refused to drop out of the race.

The 2016 documentary Weiner covers his resignation from Congress and his 2013 run for Mayor of New York City.

== See also ==
- List of federal political sex scandals in the United States
- List of scandals with "-gate" suffix
