= Institute of Muslim Minority Affairs =

Islamic organization based in London, England, United Kingdom

The Institute of Muslim Minority Affairs is a London-based scholarly institution whose stated purpose is to advance the study of Muslims in non-Muslim nations. It holds conferences and publishes books and journals. Pakistani-born Dr. Saleha Mahmood Abedin, the mother of Hillary Clinton aide Huma Abedin, is Director of the Institute. It was founded in 1978 by Dr. Syed Zainul Abedin, Dr. Saleha Mahmood Abedin's husband, who is from India, and who was educated at Aligarh Muslim University and University of Pennsylvania. Abdullah Omar Naseef, then president of the Muslim World League and president of King Abdulaziz University, provided backing to Abedin for the institute's formation.

== Journal of Muslim Minority Affairs ==
Journal of Muslim Minority Affairs
- Discipline: Muslim studies
- Language: English
- Edited by: Saleha S. Mahmood

Publication details
- Former name: Institute of Muslim Minority Affairs Journal
- History: 1979–present
- Publisher: Institute of Muslim Minority Affairs
- Frequency: Quarterly

Standard abbreviations
- ISO 4: J. Muslim Minor. Aff.

Indexing
- ISSN: 1360-2004 (print); 1469-9591 (web)
- LCCN: 96648234

In 1979, the Institute of Muslim Minority Affairs launched the Journal of Muslim Minority Affairs, a peer-reviewed journal published by Taylor & Francis. It was formerly known as the Institute of Muslim Minority Affairs Journal. It is the only scholarly journal dedicated to research on Muslims as minorities within non-Muslim societies.

CNN reported that those familiar with the journal described it as "scholarly, academic and nonpartisan" and that its content "does not raise red flags." However, the journal has published articles denying the Armenian genocide. Investigative journalist Paul E. Sperry called the journal a "radical Muslim publication".
