= Teneo =

Public affairs advisory firm

- Type: Private
- Founded: June 2011; 15 years ago
- Founders: Declan Kelly; Paul Keary; Doug Band
- Headquarters: 280 Park Avenue, New York City, United States
- Areas served: Worldwide
- Key people: Paul Keary (CEO); Ursula Burns (chairwoman)
- Website: teneo.com

Teneo is a public relations and advisory company providing strategic communications, financial advisory, restructuring, and management consulting services to corporations, financial institutions, and governments. The company was founded in 2011 by Declan Kelly, Paul Keary, and Doug Band.

As of 2025, Teneo operates in more than 40 offices worldwide with over 1,600 employees. The firm is majority-owned by CVC Capital Partners and has been valued at approximately $2.3 billion.

Today the company is led by Chairwoman Ursula Burns and CEO Paul Keary.

== History ==
CVC Capital Partners has described Teneo as providing "strategic communications, investor relations, restructuring, management consulting, physical & cyber risk, financial advisory, corporate governance advisory, ESG, political & policy risk, and talent advisory to help clients address the most complex business challenges and opportunities." Headquartered at 280 Park Avenue in Manhattan, as of 2019 the firm had offices in 18 other locations as well.

=== 2011–2014 ===
In June 2011, Teneo was founded in New York by three partners: Declan Kelly, Douglas Band, and Paul Keary. Kelly took on the roles of chairman and CEO, while Band became president, and Keary took on the role of chief operating officer.

Tony Blair and Bill Clinton were both announced as members of Teneo's advisory board, with Clinton later becoming a client and paid advisor to Teneo and its founders. Clinton was paid $2.5 million per year in the role. Clinton departed from the role in March 2012.

Teneo was first headquartered in New York's Citigroup Center building and later at 280 Park Avenue, with satellite offices in Washington, D.C., London, and Toronto.

By the summer of 2012, the firm's clients included Dow Chemical, Coca-Cola, UBS Americas, and Standard Chartered. By 2013, the firm's relationship with the Clinton family had become a point of controversy for the press as well as some Republican party politicians.

New York private equity firm BC Partners made a minority investment in Teneo in December 2014. Thereafter, Teneo grew from operating six divisions to 12 divisions, including an executive recruitment operation and a corporate governance arm, through business acquisitions and recruiting."

Founding partner Declan Kelly has been criticized for using his time at the State Department under Hillary Clinton to pursue ventures that evolved into the founding of Teneo, despite potential conflicts of interest. Among the Podesta emails were emails that mentioned the money Teneo had raised for the Clintons, including $8 million for the Clinton Foundation, and $3 million for Bill Clinton in speaking fees. Chelsea Clinton had been critical of Teneo's involvement in the Foundation, expressing concern in internal emails that they were using the Foundation for "hustling" their own business.

During the latter half of 2012, Huma Abedin was working as a paid consultant for Teneo while simultaneously working as a special government employee for U.S. Secretary of State Hillary Clinton. In 2015, Teneo received information requests from the office of U.S. Senator Chuck Grassley as part of a review into a State Department waiver granted to Abedin that had allowed her to earn income outside the government in 2012. The company refused to yield to the requests, responding that Teneo was "committed to the highest ethical and professional standards," with Abedin asserting that Teneo had never asked her to do any compromising work. Abedin was reported to have signed a contract with Teneo pledging to avoid conflict of interest problems, and a 2015 freedom of information request showed emails where she recused herself from several situations for that reason. Though the issue was seen as controversial by Republicans, The Journal noted that there "was no evidence of any fundraising, donations, or services provided by Teneo executives to the State Department or Hillary Clinton during her time as Secretary of State."

=== 2015–2017 ===
Charles Watson was named the chairman of Teneo International in January 2015, with oversight of Teneo's non-US operations. FIFA became a client in July 2015, and also around that time Teneo advised Willis Group Holdings on its merger with the consulting firm Towers Watson, a deal valued at $18 billion. In the first six months of 2015, Teneo advised clients on "communications and investor relations for 10 different M&A deals worth a total of over $60 billion." On July 9, 2015, Teneo acquired the London-based communications agencies Blue Rubicon and Stockwell, effectively doubling in size. Subsequently, on October 26, 2015, Teneo acquired Pendomer Communications in London. The acquisition doubled Teneo's employee count to about 500 and brought the headcount at Teneo's London office to 200.

Teneo has worked with the insurance firm Cigna, advising on a planned merger with Anthem in 2015, which fell through in 2017. In 2020, Cigna investors sued Cigna executives and Teneo for allegedly undermining the merger. The case was dismissed by a judge in 2022.

Teneo expanded its operations in Canada in 2016. That spring, Teneo announced that Twelve Rolling Capital would join the Teneo Capital investment banking platform. Teneo acquired the Irish PR firm PSG Communications in July 2016. PSG at the time had clients such as AIG. Teneo was also advising FIFA on its reorganization, and was "working on Los Angeles’s bid to host the 2024 Summer Olympics." That month, Teneo considered an initial public offering for 2017 with a projected valuation of up to $1 billion. Teneo had roughly 500 clients at the time. Teneo combined its two Irish businesses in March 2017. Teneo also assisted in crafting the Boston bid for the 2024 Summer Olympics.

In 2016, Teneo was hired by McDonald's to combat Fight for $15, a campaign to raise the minimum wage.

=== 2018–2020 ===
In November 2018, Teneo became the primary sponsor of Tipperary GAA. In March 2019 Teneo acquired Quay Advisers, a communications consultancy in Australia. In the summer of 2019, Teneo agreed to sell a majority stake to CVC Capital Partners in a deal that valued Teneo at around $700 million. In December 2019, Teneo announced its sponsorship of pro golfer, Shane Lowry.

From 2018 until 2020, Teneo advised key Navajo Nation figures on potentially acquiring Remington Arms, reportedly being paid $150,000 per month on the matter in 2020. Negotiations ended in 2020.

In 2019 Teneo was contracted to represent the planned Saudi Arabian city of NEOM, a project that has been criticized by human rights organizations. In May 2019, Teneo staff in London experienced disciplinary action from UK CEO Gordon Tempest-Hay for poor office behaviour in an email later shared with the UK press. Teneo was involved in private arbitration in June 2019 over its involvement in the bidding process for the oil company Anadarko, with Teneo refuting allegations that it had violated conflict of interest provisions when working for two of the bidding companies. In October 2019, Teneo was revealed to have provided services to Oxycotin manufacturer Purdue Pharma.

In January 2020, Teneo acquired Montreal-based communications company Hatley Strategy Advisors. It also acquired the London-based executive search firm Ridgeway Partners in the same month. In February 2020, it acquired communications company Bridge PR. In August 2020, Teneo acquired Goldin Associates, a financial advisory firm. The following month, it was announced that Teneo had acquired Kotinos Partners based in Dublin, Ireland. Kotinos was founded in 2010 and served a global client base of business executives and organizations.

In 2020, it was reported that ex-managing director and Trump campaign strategist Jason Miller, previously fired for a series of incendiary comments on Twitter, was still allegedly receiving payments from the company beyond the date of his termination. Teneo sought to use Miller's connections to Republicans close to President Trump.

In September 2020, it was disclosed that Teneo had provided strategic counsel and stakeholder outreach for LetterOne, an international investment firm whose founders included Mikhail Fridman and Petr Aven, both Russian oligarchs sanctioned by the EU in February 2022. With Teneo likely being paid at least $1 million, according to the U.S. Department of Justice, the contract ended in October 2021. According to CNBC, in 2022 the department's Foreign Agents Registration Act (FARA) Unit said it believed the contract "remains active."

=== 2021–2022 ===
In February 2021, Teneo acquired the UK restructuring business unit of Deloitte. At time of rating, Moody's ruled this partially debt-funded acquisition as 'moderate credit positive', decreasing debt-to-EBITDA from 6.5x to 6.1x. Teneo's overall rating remained at B2. In August 2021, Teneo acquired the executive search firm Anna Whitlam People. In December 2021, Teneo hired Gaby Sulzberger as the firm's chair of global ESG practice. Sulzberger previously served as CFO of several companies and CEO of a private company.

In March 2021, The Times reported on an understanding that Craig Oliver, then a Teneo employee and former cabinet member of David Cameron, had promoted Greensill Capital, a former Teneo client. At the time, Cameron was accused of performing lobbying activities on behalf of Greensill and Teneo had three of Cameron's former colleagues on staff as advisors. In response, Teneo refuted that Oliver had lobbied for Greensill to "anyone in government". Oliver left Teneo in October 2021.

On June 24, 2021, it was reported by the Financial Times that chairman and CEO Declan Kelly had inappropriately touched six women at a Global Citizen charity fundraising event in May of that year. An investigation was launched, and Kelly was removed from his role on Global Citizen's board the following day, chaired by Christopher Stadler, an investor responsible for managing CVC Capital Partners’s stake in Teneo. On June 25, Teneo was reported to have held a call with its UK-based senior advisors, General Motors had dropped Teneo as its public relations advisor and a senior managing director had resigned from the company. On June 29, it was announced that Declan Kelly had resigned from Teneo and the role of chairman and CEO had been taken up by co-founder Paul Keary. In July 2021, Ursula Burns was appointed as chairwomen of Teneo.

In 2021, Teneo was ranked 19th on the Global Top 250 PR Agency Ranking.

In March 2022, Teneo acquired KPMG's restructuring business in Bermuda to bring Teneo's Financial Advisory business to a headcount of over 350. In June, Teneo acquired a majority stake in Washington, D.C.–based strategy and communications company WestExec Advisors, which follows a minority stake taken by Teneo in 2021. WestExec Advisors will continue to operate as an independent brand.

In September 2022, Teneo extended its contract with golfer Shane Lowry.

=== 2023-present ===
In early January 2023, Teneo announced the appointment of Geoff Morrell to the role of the President of Global Strategy & Communications. He formally served in executive positions of communications at Disney, BP, and the Deputy Assistant Secretary of Defense for Public Affairs and the Press Secretary for the US Department of Defense. Teneo purchased the PR firm Tulchan in the United Kingdom in January. Also early in 2023, Teneo opened an office in Amsterdam, Netherlands. In 2024, Teneo received $4.7 million by the authoritarian regime in Azerbaijan to manage publicity for Azerbaijan hosting COP29.

In July 2025, Bloomberg reported that Teneo was on track to have annual revenues of $750 million, doubled from 2021. Teneo invested in the sports advisory firm Altius8 in July 2025, also acquiring the Australia business restructuring services unit of the auditing firm PwC. At the time, Teneo's financial advisory division had 600 employees. After an investment round in August 2025, Teneo's value was estimated at about $2.3 billion, up from $750 million in 2019. CVC Capital Partners remained the majority shareholder, while co-founder Paul Keary remained CEO.

In January 2026, Teneo announced it had struck deals to acquire two international firms: Clarity Partners, and PricewaterhouseCoopers' business restructuring unit in New Zealand. The summer prior, Teneo had acquired PwC's Australian unit as well. Teneo said it would open offices in New Zealand and Copenhagen due to the acquisitions. Pro golfer Justin Rose signed a three-year deal with Teneo in April 2026 to serve as Teneo's brand ambassador. In March 2026, Teneo launched a joint venture with Thoughtworks, which operates an agentic development platform, on AI services.

== Senior advisors ==
Teneo is known for hiring top-level former politicians as senior advisors, including Huma Abedin at the time she was the top advisor to Secretary of State Hillary Clinton; former Speaker of the House Paul Ryan; former Senate Majority Leader George J. Mitchell; and former Senator Chris Dodd, a top advisor to President Joe Biden.

== See also ==
- List of companies based in New York City
