= U.S. – Northern Ireland Investment Conference =

US-Northern Ireland Investment Conference (US-NI Investment Conference) was an investment conference in May 2008 in Northern Ireland.

The conference was run by Invest Northern Ireland (Invest NI), Office of the First Minister and deputy First Minister, Department of Enterprise, Trade and Investment and supported by Northern Bank and BT Group.

== About ==
The event was fully endorsed “by UK Prime Minister, Gordon Brown, the US administration, the Government of the Republic of Ireland and the European Union."

The investment conference was expected to provide a unique opportunity for invited delegates to see the dramatic transformation that has taken place in Northern Ireland. The conference was a tightly focused business event and "120 executives from 80 companies" were expected to attend. Delegates were invited from industry sectors in which Northern Ireland had particular strengths and which offered the delegates a good match for their businesses.

== Programme ==
The programme began with a welcome reception at the Ulster Folk and Transport Museum on May 7, 2008. The main conference was on the morning of May 8, 2008, followed by afternoon forums for delegates. A gala dinner was held that evening at Hillsborough Castle. On May 9, 2008, delegates were invited to take part in a tailored business programme specific to their sector.

== Paisley legacy ==
Ian Paisley announced that he would step down as First Minister after the US-NI Investment Conference. On March 4, 2008, he said "I came to this decision a few weeks ago when I was thinking very much about the forthcoming investment conference and what was going to come after the conference, I thought that it is a marker, a very big marker and it would be a very appropriate time for me to bow out."

== See also ==
- Invest Northern Ireland
- Office of the First Minister and deputy First Minister
- Department of Enterprise, Trade and Investment
- Ian Paisley
- First Minister and deputy First Minister
