= Invest Northern Ireland =

Economic development agency for Northern Ireland

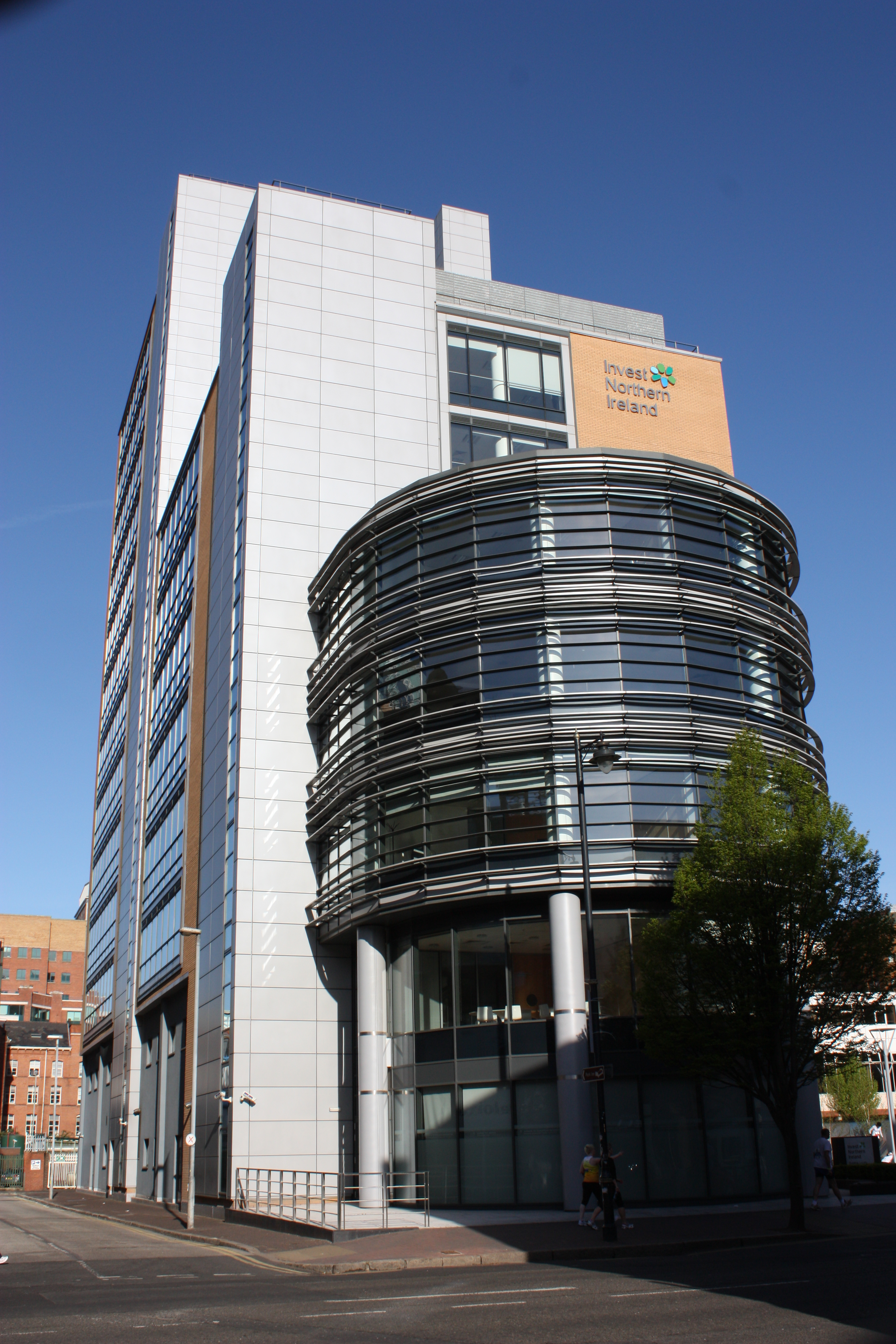
- Invest NI headquarters, Bedford Street, Belfast in May 2010

Agency overview
- Formed: April 2002
- Jurisdiction: Northern Ireland
- Headquarters: Bedford Square, 1 Bedford Street, Belfast, BT2 7ES
- Employees: 549
- Annual budget: £107.7m GBP (2024)
- Agency executive: Kieran Donoghue, Chief Executive Officer
- Parent agency: Department for the Economy

Invest Northern Ireland (Invest NI) is Northern Ireland's regional economic development agency. It is a non-departmental public body (NDPB) of the Department for the Economy (DfE). According to DETI's website, it "supports business growth and inward investment, promotes innovation, research and development and in-company training, encourages exports and supports local economic development and company start up."

== About ==
According to Invest NI's website: "Our role is to grow the economy by helping new and existing businesses to compete internationally, and by attracting new investment to Northern Ireland. We are part of the Department of Enterprise, Trade and Investment and provide strong government support for business by effectively delivering the Government's economic development strategies, making the most efficient use of available resources. Invest NI offers the Northern Ireland business community a single organisation providing high-quality services, programs, support and expert advice. We principally support businesses in the manufacturing and tradeable services sectors."

According to disclosures under the American Foreign Agents Registration Act, Invest Northern Ireland is engaged in lobbying U.S. legislators or government bodies.

== Structure ==
Invest NI is headed up by a Chief Executive Officer (CEO) who has overall responsibility for the agency's performance. Kieran Donoghue was appointed as CEO in October 2023 after a review by Sir Michael Lyons found 'profound divisions' at the top of the organisation. He replaced Mel Chittock, who served on an interim basis.

Executive Directors lead a number of different functions within the organisation:

- Finance
- Regional Business
- Strategy and Partnerships
- Business Growth
- International and Skills
- People and Culture
- Marketing and Communications

Each Director is in charge of various departments under their portfolio.

== See also ==
- Department for the Economy
- Economy of Northern Ireland
- US-Northern Ireland Investment Conference
