= Anthony Weiner =

American politician and sex offender (born 1964)

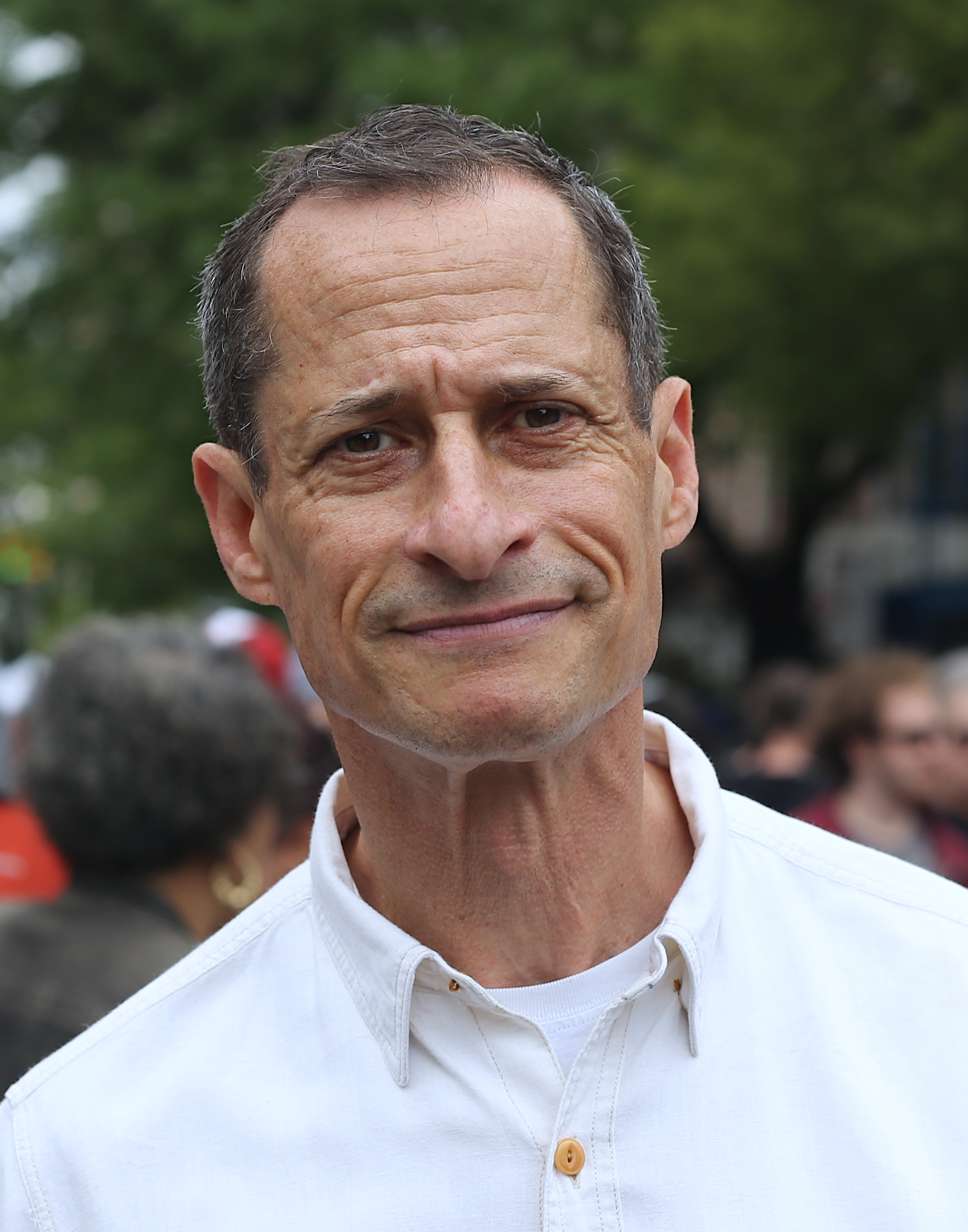
- Weiner in 2025

Member of the U.S. House of Representatives from New York's 9th district
- In office January 3, 1999 – June 21, 2011
- Preceded by: Chuck Schumer
- Succeeded by: Bob Turner

Member of the New York City Council from the 48th district
- In office January 1, 1992 – December 31, 1998
- Preceded by: Constituency established
- Succeeded by: Michael Chaim Nelson

Personal details
- Born: Anthony David Weiner; September 4, 1964 (age 62) New York City, U.S.
- Party: Democratic
- Spouse: Huma Abedin (m. 2010; div. 2025)
- Children: 1
- Education: State University of New York, Plattsburgh (BA)
- Criminal details
- Criminal information
- Status: Paroled
- Criminal charge: Transferring obscene material to a minor
- Penalty: 21 months in federal prison Pay a $10,000 fine Required to permanently register as a sex offender

Details
- Victims: 1
- Date apprehended: May 19, 2017

Anthony David Weiner (/ˈwiːnər/ born September 4, 1964) is an American politician and child sex offender. A Democrat, Weiner has served on the New York City Council and in the U.S. House of Representatives. He is known for his involvement in multiple sex scandals, one of which led to his resignation from the House and another of which became an issue in the 2016 United States presidential election and led to Weiner's eventual incarceration.

After graduating from the State University of New York at Plattsburgh in 1985, Weiner joined the staff of then-U.S. Representative Chuck Schumer. In 1991, he was elected to represent the 48th district on the New York City Council. At age 27, Weiner became the youngest New York City councilmember in history. He served on the City Council from 1992 to 1998. Weiner was elected to the U.S. House of Representatives from New York's 9th congressional district in 1998 and served in the House from 1999 until his resignation in 2011. Weiner also ran for mayor of New York City in 2005 and 2013, losing in the Democratic primary both times.

Weiner resigned from the House in June 2011 after it was revealed that he had sent sexually suggestive photos of himself to various women. A second sexting scandal engulfed his 2013 campaign for New York City mayor. In September 2016, claims were published that Weiner had engaged in sexting with a 15-year-old girl from North Carolina; devices owned by Weiner were seized as part of an investigation into this incident. Information pertinent to the Hillary Clinton email controversy was discovered on Weiner's laptop, leading FBI Director James Comey to reopen his investigation into Clinton days before Clinton lost the 2016 presidential election to Donald Trump. Weiner later pleaded guilty to transferring obscene material to a minor and served more than a year in federal prison.

Weiner ran for New York City Council in the 2nd district in 2025, finishing in fourth place in the Democratic primary and losing to Harvey Epstein.

== Early life, education, and early career ==
Weiner was born in Brooklyn, New York. He is the middle son of Mort Weiner, a lawyer, and his wife, Frances (née Finkelstein), a public high school math teacher. Weiner is Jewish. He and his family lived for a time in the Park Slope neighborhood of Brooklyn. Weiner attended elementary school at P.S. 39 The Henry Bristow School.

Weiner took the Specialized High Schools Admissions Test, an examination used to determine admission to all but one of New York City's specialized high schools, and was admitted to Brooklyn Technical High School, from which he graduated in 1981. He attended the State University of New York at Plattsburgh and spent his junior year as an exchange student at the College of William & Mary, where he was friends with future comic and political commentator Jon Stewart. Weiner's interests turned towards politics; he became active in student government and was named most effective student senator.

After he received his Bachelor of Arts degree in political science in 1985, Weiner joined the staff of then–United States Representative and current Senator Charles Schumer. He worked in Schumer's Washington, D.C., office for three years, then transferred to the district office in Brooklyn in 1988, when Schumer encouraged him to become involved in local politics.

== New York City Council (1992–1998) ==
After working for Schumer for six years, Weiner got his first chance at political office in 1991 when the New York City Council was expanded from 35 to 51 seats. Weiner was considered a long-shot because he faced strong competition in the Democratic primary elections from two well-connected candidates. Weiner narrowly won the primary, besting Michael Garson by slightly more than 200 votes. Controversy ensued in the last weeks of the campaign after Weiner's campaign anonymously spread leaflets around the district that had alleged ties between Cohen and the so-called "Jackson-Dinkins agenda"; the leaflets referred to the Crown Heights riots earlier in the year, after which white residents had seen Jesse Jackson, who became notorious for his earlier remarks about New York City as "Hymietown", and then-mayor David Dinkins as having been beholden to the predominantly African-American rioters and therefore endangering whites. Weiner prevailed in the general election.

Weiner began serving on the City Council when he was 27 years of age, making him the youngest city councilmember in history. Weiner served on the City Council from 1992 to 1998. During his City Council tenure, Weiner initiated programs to address quality of life concerns. He also started a program to put at-risk and troubled teens to work cleaning up graffiti, and he backed development plans that helped revive the historic Sheepshead Bay area.

== U.S. House of Representatives (1999–2011) ==
In 1998, Weiner ran for Congress from New York's 9th congressional district. The heavily Democratic 9th district was represented by Weiner's mentor, Chuck Schumer, who opted to run for the U.S. Senate that year and prevailed. Weiner narrowly won the Democratic primary election and won by a wide margin in the general election. He went on to serve in the House of Representatives until 2011, when he resigned in the midst of a sexting scandal. A special election was held on September 13, 2011, to replace him; Republican businessman Bob Turner defeated Democrat David Weprin in that election.

=== Domestic issues ===
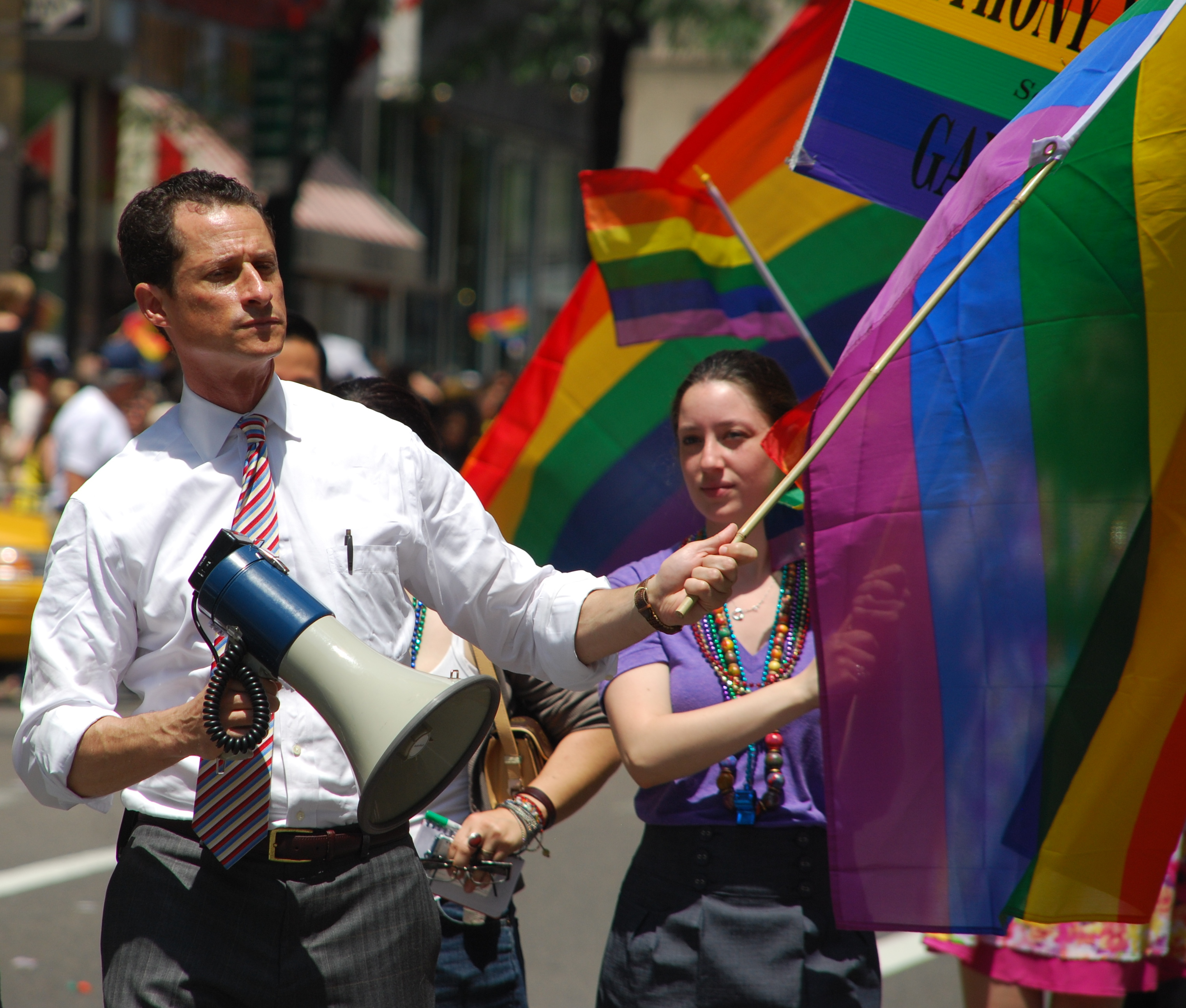
Weiner shows his support for the LGBT community during the New York City Gay Pride Parade, 2009.

Weiner was critical of the 2009 Stupak-Pitts Amendment to the Affordable Care Act, which prohibited the use of taxpayer funds for abortion. Weiner called the amendment "unnecessary and divisive" and stated that it would prevent health insurers from offering abortion coverage regardless of whether an individual used federal funds to purchase an insurance plan.

In April 2008, Weiner created the bi-partisan Congressional Middle Class Caucus. In June 2008, Weiner sponsored a bill to increase the number of O-visas available to foreign fashion models, arguing that it would help boost the fashion industry in New York City. He criticized UN diplomats for failing to pay parking tickets in New York City, claiming foreign nations owed $18,000,000 to the city.

During the health care reform debates of 2009, Weiner advocated for a bill called the United States National Health Care Act, which would have expanded Medicare to all Americans, regardless of age. He remarked that while 4% of Medicare funds go to overhead, private insurers put 30% of their customer's money into profits and overhead instead of into health care. In late July 2009, he secured a full House floor vote for single payer health care in exchange for not amending America's Affordable Health Choices Act of 2009 in committee mark-up with a single-payer plan.

When a public health insurance option was being considered as part of America's Affordable Health Choices Act of 2009, Weiner said that it would help reduce costs, and he set up a website to push for the option. He attracted widespread attention when described the Republican Party as "a wholly owned subsidiary of the insurance industry, teaming up with a small group of Democrats to try to protect that industry". In February 2010, he proclaimed to Congress that "every single Republican I have ever met in my entire life is a wholly owned subsidiary of the insurance industry."

Weiner was the chief sponsor of the Prevent All Cigarette Trafficking Act of 2009, which made the selling of tobacco in violation of any state tax law a federal crime, and effectively ended Internet tobacco smuggling by stopping shipments of cigarettes through the United States Postal Service. He claimed, "This new law will give states and localities a major revenue boost by cracking down on the illegal sale of tobacco", and added that "Every day we delay is another day that New York loses significant amounts of tax revenue and kids have easy access to tobacco products sold over the Internet."

On July 29, 2010, Weiner criticized Republicans for opposing the 9/11 Health and Compensation Act, which would provide for funds for sick first responders to the 9/11 attacks on the World Trade Center. In a speech on the floor of the House, he accused Republicans of hiding behind procedural questions as an excuse to vote against the bill.

In response to pressure from Weiner, YouTube removed some of Anwar al-Awlaki's inflammatory videos from its website in November 2010. Weiner voted against the Tax Relief, Unemployment Insurance Reauthorization, and Job Creation Act of 2010. As a prominent Democratic opponent of the tax cut package passed by Congress, Weiner said Republicans had gotten the better of President Barack Obama in the negotiations to reach an agreement on the $858 billion deal and said the Republicans turned out to be "better poker players" than Obama.

In 2002, Weiner voiced strong criticism of the removal of the World Trade Center debris without investigating it to determine the causes of the collapses of Tower 1, 2 and 7.

=== Foreign policy ===
In 2002, Weiner voted to give President George W. Bush the authority to use military force against Iraq. In May 2006, Weiner attempted to bar the Palestinian delegation from entering the United Nations. He added that the delegation "should start packing their little Palestinian terrorist bags", and went on to claim that Human Rights Watch, The New York Times, and Amnesty International are all biased against Israel.

On July 29, 2007, Weiner and Rep. Jerrold Nadler (D-N.Y.) objected to a $20-billion arms deal that the Bush administration negotiated with Saudi Arabia because they didn't want to provide "sophisticated weapons to a country that they believe has not done enough to stop terrorism", noting that 15 of the 19 hijackers in the September 11 attacks were Saudis. Weiner made the announcement outside of the Saudi Arabian consulate in Washington, D.C., stating, "We need to send a crystal clear message to the Saudi Arabian government that their tacit approval of terrorism can't go unpunished." The two intended to use a provision of the Arms Export Control Act to review the deal and pass a Joint Resolution of Disapproval.

Weiner and several other members of Congress later criticized the Obama administration's proposal to sell over $60 billion in arms to Saudi Arabia. He said: "Saudi Arabia is not deserving of our aid, and by arming them with advanced American weaponry we are sending the wrong message", and described Saudi Arabia as having a "history of financing terrorism" and teaching "hatred of Christians and Jews" to its schoolchildren.

=== Management style ===
In July 2008, The New York Times characterized Weiner as an intense and demanding boss who required constant contact from his staff, frequently yelled, and occasionally threw office furniture in anger. As a result of Weiner's actions, the Times reported that he had one of the highest staff turnover rates of any member of Congress. Specifically, the Times stated that Weiner had lost three chiefs of staff within an 18-month period. Weiner admitted he pushed his aides hard, but said that his speaking at a high decibel level was part of his background and style. Though some former employees were critical of his supervisory practices, others praised him for his intense involvement in constituent concerns and readiness to fight for New York City.

=== Traffic tickets ===
A 2010 license plate check by the Capitol Hill newspaper Roll Call showed that Weiner's vehicles were among several owned by members of Congress that had unpaid tickets. Weiner's past due fines, which spanned three years and totaled more than $2,000, were among the highest uncovered by Roll Call and were paid in full shortly after publication of the article. On June 13, 2011, the New York Daily News reported that one of Weiner's vehicles, though it had been issued valid plates, was displaying expired plates that had been issued to another one of his vehicles.

== Other political campaigns ==
=== 2005 New York City mayoral election ===
Weiner sought the Democratic nomination to run for New York City mayor in 2005, vying against three other candidates. He had a three-part pitch to voters that included criticizing sitting Mayor Michael Bloomberg for his top-down style of management and promising a more democratic approach; against "passivity in City Hall" and for getting more federal money for the city; and a series of ideas on how to get the city to work better. He presented a book of 50 "Real Solutions" and among his policy proposals were fixes for the health care and educational systems. One idea already in play was a neighborhood scrubbing-up program he dubbed "Weiner's Cleaners".

Weiner started out last in many polls, but gained ground in the final weeks of the campaign, coming in second. Initial election returns had Fernando Ferrer with 39.95% of the vote, just shy of the 40% required to avoid a runoff against Weiner, who had 28.82%, but Weiner conceded, citing the need for party unity and denying rumors that various high-ranking New York Democrats, such as Senator Chuck Schumer and New York Attorney General Eliot Spitzer, had urged him to concede. Absentee ballots put Ferrer over the 40% mark in the official primary election returns.

=== 2009 New York City mayoral election ===
Weiner appeared to be a candidate for mayor again in 2009. However, in May 2009, after the New York City Council voted to extend term limits for Mayor Bloomberg, Weiner announced his decision not to run against the popular incumbent. By July 2010, Weiner had raised $3.9 million for a potential campaign in the 2013 mayoral election, and was considered a leading contender in early polls. According to the New York City Campaign Finance Board website, as of the March 2013 filing deadline Weiner had raised over $5.1 million, the second most among registered mayoral candidates, behind only Christine Quinn.

=== 2013 New York City mayoral election ===
In an interview with The New York Times Magazine published online on April 10, 2013, Weiner said he would like to "ask people to give me a second chance" and was considering a run for mayor. He added that, "it's now or maybe never for me."

In an interview on April 11, Rep. Keith Ellison endorsed Weiner, saying that he would love to see him become mayor of New York. Weiner announced his intent to run for mayor on a YouTube video on May 21, 2013. Weiner's platform for candidacy was summarized in "Keys to the City: 64 Ideas to Keep New York City the Capital of the Middle Class".

During his mayoral campaign, Weiner became the subject of new sexting allegations. He acknowledged on July 23, 2013, that he had sent sexual messages to at least three women in 2012. Once this information became public, there were calls for Weiner to drop out of the mayoral race; however, Weiner opted to continue his campaign. On July 27, 2013, Danny Kedem, Weiner's campaign chief, announced his resignation. Following the new sexting scandal, Weiner lost his lead in a Democratic primary poll.

On September 10, 2013, Weiner lost the Democratic mayoral primary, winning only 4.9% of the vote.

=== 2025 New York City Council election ===
In 2025, Weiner announced his candidacy in the 2025 New York City Council election for District 2. He ran against New York State Assemblyman Harvey Epstein and three other Democrats (Allie Ryan, Andrea Gordillo, and Sarah Batchu). The district was represented by Democrat Carlina Rivera, who was term-limited. On July 1, 2025, he lost the Democratic primary after being eliminated in the third round of ranked choice voting. Unofficial data indicate that he finished in fourth place with 10.3% of the vote.

== Sexting scandals, prosecution, and guilty plea ==
On May 27, 2011, Weiner used his public Twitter account to send a link to a woman who was following him on the social media platform. The link contained a sexually explicit photograph of himself. After several days of denying that he had posted the image, Weiner held a press conference at which he admitted he had "exchanged messages and photos of an explicit nature with about six women over the last three years" and apologized for his earlier denials. After an explicit photo was leaked through the Twitter account of a listener of The Opie & Anthony Show, Weiner announced on June 16, 2011, that he would resign from Congress, and he did so on June 21.

A second sexting scandal began in July 2013, several months after Weiner had returned to politics in the New York City mayoral race. An entertainment website posted a lewd photo it obtained from a woman who stated that Weiner had sent her the photo in 2012, after he had left Congress. Weiner acknowledged that he was the man in the photo. Weiner further acknowledged that he had sent sexual messages to at least three women in 2012. After his resignation from Congress, Weiner had used the alias "Carlos Danger" to continue sending explicit photographs. One recipient stated that Weiner described himself to her as “an argumentative, perpetually horny middle-aged man”. On July 23, 2013, Weiner held a press conference with his wife, Huma Abedin, in which he announced that he would continue his campaign. At the press conference, Weiner said, "I said that other texts and photos were likely to come out and today they have... I want to again say that I am very sorry to anyone who was on the receiving end of these messages and the disruption this has caused.” Weiner went on to lose the 2013 Democratic mayoral primary.

On August 28, 2016, the New York Post reported that Weiner had sexted a woman a picture of himself wearing briefs while he was lying in bed with his young son. The New York Times reported the next day that Weiner and his wife Huma Abedin intended to separate. Abedin announced her intention by stating, "After long and painful consideration and work on my marriage, I have made the decision to separate from my husband. Anthony and I remain devoted to doing what is best for our son, who is the light of our life. During this difficult time, I ask for respect for our privacy."

In September 2016, claims were published that Weiner had engaged in sexting with a 15-year-old girl from North Carolina, and devices owned by Weiner were seized as part of an investigation into this incident. Emails that were pertinent to the Hillary Clinton email controversy were discovered on Weiner's laptop; this discovery prompted FBI Director James Comey to reopen that investigation several days before the 2016 US presidential election. Comey announced his decision in a letter to Congress. An article by The New York Times about the Comey letter was entitled, "Emails in Anthony Weiner Inquiry Jolt Hillary Clinton's Campaign". Clinton, who went on to lose the 2016 election, later asserted that if the election had been held prior to the release of Comey's letter, she would have prevailed. Analyst Nate Silver opined that the Comey letter probably cost Clinton the election. In 2017, Z. Byron Wolf of CNN wrote:

Anthony Weiner sexted a 15-year-old and Donald Trump won the White House. One didn’t cause the other, but several long-running narratives exploded together in a way that ultimately and in hindsight sent Hillary Clinton’s campaign floundering and gave Donald Trump’s new hope in the waning days of the election. There is an undeniable through-line between the investigation into Weiner’s proclivity to sending lewd message via text, on this occasion victimizing a teenage student, and Trump’s 2016 victory.

On January 31, 2017, The Wall Street Journal reported that federal prosecutors were weighing whether or not to bring child pornography charges against Weiner over the incident. On May 19, 2017, The New York Times reported in its online edition that Weiner had surrendered to the FBI that morning. He pled guilty to a single charge of transferring obscene material to a minor. Under the agreement, Weiner faced a sentence of 21 to 27 months in federal prison and would be required to register as a sex offender. At his sentencing hearing on September 25, 2017, presiding judge Denise Cote sentenced Weiner to 21 months in prison, beginning on November 6, 2017, with an additional three years of supervision following his prison term.

On November 6, 2017, Weiner reported to Federal Medical Center, Devens in Ayer, Massachusetts to begin his 21-month sentence. After getting about three months deducted from his sentence for good behavior, Weiner was released from prison on February 17, 2019, and sent to a halfway house. He was released from a halfway house on May 14, 2019. Weiner is registered as a sex offender.

== Post-congressional private sector work ==
In July 2011 (less than a month after he left Congress), Weiner created the consulting firm Woolf-Weiner Associates. He advised over a dozen companies that included electronic medical records providers and biofuel firms. He worked with Covington & Burling, an international law firm. According to 2012 public disclosures, his work helped increase his combined family income to $496,000. Weiner argued that despite contacting members of Congress on behalf of his clients, his work did not meet the legal definition of lobbying. This was based on the so-called "Daschle Loophole" in the Lobbying Disclosure Act, which requires only those who spend more than 20% of their time lobbying to register as lobbyists.

The Sunlight Foundation criticized Weiner for stealth lobbying and falling under the aforementioned "Daschle Loophole". The public never learned of his lobbying work until two years later, when his nondisclosure agreements expired.

From July to September 2015, Weiner worked for MWW Group, a PR firm in New York City as a part-time consultant to serve on the company's board of advisors.

On August 29, 2016, the New York Daily News said it would no longer carry Weiner's columns, which included his writings on New York City politics. On the same day, television channel NY1 said Weiner would not be reprising his contributor role on any of its shows.

Weiner served as CEO of IceStone, a Brooklyn-based kitchen-countertop company. He left his role as CEO in August 2021, as the company transitioned to a worker-owned cooperative.

After leaving IceStone, he began working for WABC radio, where he co-hosts a weekly live show with Curtis Sliwa and records a weekly podcast.

== Personal life ==
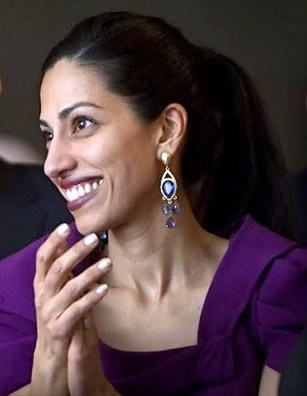
Weiner's then-wife, Huma Abedin, in 2010

In 2009, Weiner became engaged to Huma Abedin, a long-time personal aide to Hillary Clinton, and they married in July 2010, with former president Bill Clinton officiating. Abedin is a practicing Muslim of Indian and Pakistani descent. In December 2011, Abedin gave birth to a son.

In August 2016, Abedin announced that she was separating from Weiner. In early 2017, Abedin announced her intent to file for divorce with sole physical custody of their son. On May 19, 2017, after he pleaded guilty to an obscenity charge, she filed for divorce. Abedin and Weiner withdrew their divorce case from court in January 2018, saying they decided to settle the divorce privately in order to spare their six-year-old son further embarrassment. Abedin and Weiner finalized their divorce in early 2025.

Weiner's older brother, Seth, was 39 years old when he was killed by a hit-and-run driver in 2000. His younger brother, Jason, is a chef and co-owner of several New York restaurants.

Weiner is a lifelong fan of the New York Mets and New York Islanders.

== Media appearances ==
In 2013, Weiner and Abedin allowed filmmakers full access to his mayoral campaign. In 2016, the resulting documentary, Weiner, premiered at the Sundance Film Festival. In 2013, a production called The Weiner Monologues premiered at the Access Theater. Directed by Jonathan Harper Schlieman, the show was based on media coverage of Weiner's sexting scandal.

In 2014, he had a cameo appearance in an Alpha House episode. He also appeared in the 2015 film Sharknado 3: Oh Hell No!, in which he portrays a NASA executive.

== Electoral history ==
US House election, 1998: New York District 9
Party	Candidate	Votes	%	±%
Democratic	Anthony D. Weiner	69,439	66.4	−8.4
Republican	Louis Telano	24,486	23.4	+2.1
Liberal	Melinda Katz	5,698	5.5	+5.5
Conservative	Arthur J. Smith	4,899	4.7	+0.8
Majority		44,953	43.0	−10.5
Turnout		104,522	100	−27.0

US House election, 2000: New York District 9
Party	Candidate	Votes	%	±%
Democratic	Anthony D. Weiner (incumbent)	98,983	68.4	+2.0
Republican	Noach Dear	45,649	31.6	+8.2
Majority		53,334	36.9	−6.1
Turnout		144,632	100	+38.4

US House election, 2002: New York District 9
Party	Candidate	Votes	%	±%
Democratic	Anthony D. Weiner (incumbent)	60,737	65.7	−2.7
Republican	Alfred F. Donohue	31,698	34.3	+2.7
Majority		29,039	31.4	−5.5
Turnout		92,435	100	−36.1

US House election, 2004: New York District 9
Party	Candidate	Votes	%	±%
Democratic	Anthony D. Weiner (incumbent)	113,025	71.3	+5.6
Republican	Gerard J. Cronin	45,451	28.7	−5.6
Majority		67,574	42.6	+11.2
Turnout		158,476	100	+71.4

US House election, 2006: New York District 9
Party	Candidate	Votes	%	±%
Democratic	Anthony D. Weiner (incumbent)	71,762	100	+28.7
Majority		71,762	100	+57.4
Turnout		71,762	100	−54.7

US House election, 2008: New York District 9
Party	Candidate	Votes	%	±%
Democratic	Anthony D. Weiner (incumbent)	112,205	93.1	−6.9
Conservative	Alfred F. Donohue	8,378	6.9	+6.9
Majority		103,827	86.2	−13.8
Turnout		120,583	100	+68.0

US House election, 2010: New York District 9
Party	Candidate	Votes	%	±%
Democratic	Anthony D. Weiner (incumbent)	67,011	60.8	−32.3
Republican	Bob Turner	43,129	39.2	+39.2
Majority		23,882	21.6	−64.6
Turnout		110,140	100	−8.7
Democratic hold				

=== 2013 New York City mayoral primary ===
2013 Democratic primary	Manhattan	The Bronx	Brooklyn	Queens	Staten Island	Total	%
Bill de Blasio	81,197	36,896	104,703	52,190	7,358	282,344	40.81%
Bill de Blasio	40.91%	38.12%	46.36%	34.96%	34.33%	282,344	40.81%
Bill Thompson	42,720	31,617	61,471	38,162	6,871	180,841	26.14%
Bill Thompson	21.53%	32.67%	27.22%	25.56%	32.06%	180,841	26.14%
Christine Quinn	52,102	10,392	23,007	19,847	3,545	108,893	15.74%
Christine Quinn	26.25%	10.74%	10.19%	13.29%	16.54%	108,893	15.74%
John Liu	10,191	4,753	13,927	16,977	1,438	47,286	6.84%
John Liu	5.14%	4.91%	6.17%	11.37%	6.71%	47,286	6.84%
Anthony Weiner	6,858	5,726	10,950	9,438	1,220	34,192	4.94%
Anthony Weiner	3.46%	5.92%	4.85%	6.32%	5.69%	34,192	4.94%
Erick Salgado	2,296	3,855	5,793	3,735	235	15,914	2.30%
Erick Salgado	1.16%	3.98%	2.57%	2.50%	1.10%	15,914	2.30%
Randy Credico	1,588	2,301	2,351	5,129	161	11,530	1.67%
Randy Credico	0.80%	2.38%	1.04%	3.44%	0.75%	11,530	1.67%
Sal Albanese	821	581	2,346	1,648	447	5,843	0.84%
Sal Albanese	0.41%	0.60%	1.04%	1.10%	2.09%	5,843	0.84%
Neil Grimaldi	634	640	1,108	2,157	138	4,677	0.68%
Neil Grimaldi	0.32%	0.66%	0.49%	1.44%	0.64%	4,677	0.68%
all Write-In votes	50	18	172	21	20	281	0.04%
all Write-In votes	0.03%	0.02%	0.08%	0.01%	0.09%	281	0.04%
TOTAL	198,457	96,779	225,828	149,304	21,443	691,801	
TURNOUT	29.83%	19.30%	23.96%	21.58%	17.71%	23.67%	

=== 2025 New York City Council election, District 2 Democratic Primary ===
District 2 Democratic primary
Party	Candidate	Maximum round	Maximum votes	Share in maximum round	Maximum votes First round votes Transfer votes
Democratic	Harvey Epstein	4	14,703	56.8%	
Democratic	Sarah Batchu	4	11,182	43.2%	
Democratic	Andrea Gordillo	3	6,898	24.8%	
Democratic	Anthony Weiner	2	3,079	10.2%	
Democratic	Allie Ryan	2	2,398	7.9%	
Write-in		1	133	0.4%	

== See also ==
- List of American federal politicians convicted of crimes
- List of federal political scandals in the United States
- List of federal political sex scandals in the United States
- List of Jewish members of the United States Congress

U.S. House of Representatives
Preceded by Chuck Schumer	Member of the U.S. House of Representatives from New York's 9th congressional district 1999–2011	Succeeded by Bob Turner
U.S. order of precedence (ceremonial)
Preceded by Vito Fossella as Former U.S. Representative	Order of precedence of the United States as Former U.S. Representative	Succeeded by Tim Bishop as Former U.S. Representative
