= Doug Band =

American presidential advisor (born 1972)

- Born: Douglas Jay Band; October 28, 1972 (age 53)
- Education: University of Florida (BA); Georgetown University (MA, JD)
- Spouse: Lily Rafii

Douglas Jay Band (born October 28, 1972) is an American businessman and lawyer who is a founding partner and former president of Teneo, a multinational C-suite advisory firm and investment bank. Previously he was Deputy Assistant to President Bill Clinton in the White House and later counselor to President Bill Clinton. Band was the "key architect" of the Clinton post-presidency and he created the Clinton Global Initiative (CGI). Band later worked for the William J. Clinton Foundation, and also traveled to North Korea to orchestrate the release of the two Americans and to Cuba to help secure the release of another American, Alan P. Gross.

He was a member of Coca-Cola's international advisory committee, and has been an associate adjunct professor at New York University since 2010, teaching a class on public service.

== Early life and education ==
Band is the youngest of four children of David and Myrna Band. A native of Sarasota, Florida, Band earned a bachelor's degree from the University of Florida with a major in English and a minor in Ethics. He was a member of the Sigma Phi Epsilon fraternity. While working in the White House for six years, he earned a master's degree in liberal arts from Georgetown University's graduate school and a Juris Doctor degree from Georgetown University Law Center, attending both programs in the evening while working full time in the White House.

== Career ==
=== Service in the Clinton presidency ===
Band began working in the White House in 1995 during the Clinton presidency as an unpaid intern in the White House Counsel's Office. Band then served on the White House Counsel's office staff for four years, eventually becoming a special assistant to the president, and then one of the youngest deputy assistants ever to serve a president. Band then served as the President's aide, traveling to nearly 125 countries and over 2,000 cities.

=== Post-presidential career ===
Band served as counselor and chief advisor to former President Clinton until 2012 and became "the key architect of Clinton's post-presidency." During Clinton's post-presidency, Band helped set up and advised President Clinton's personal office and the Clinton Global Initiative and advised the William J. Clinton Foundation in its formative years. He created and built the Clinton Global Initiative. According to figures released by the Clinton Foundation, CGI raised $69 billion for 2,100 philanthropic projects around the world. Clinton has credited Band with CGI: "Doug had the idea to do this," also stating that he was "very grateful for the role that [Band] played when we started out."

In 2002, Band met Jeffrey Epstein as Clinton and Epstein went on a trip together. Band said he disliked Epstein and urged Clinton to cease his relationship with him, which Clinton refused to do. Band has been proven to have lied. He referred to convicted sex trafficker Maxwell as his "boo-boo." However, an article in the October 28, 2002 issue of New York Magazine noted that Band was in fact the one who suggested to Epstein that Clinton use his plane for the September 2002 Africa trip, which in turn strengthened Clinton's relationship with Epstein and also got Epstein, who was at the time greatly unreported in even gossip columns, greater publicity.

Band claimed in a 2020 interview that he was unaware of Epstein's criminal activities, and he also said Clinton had visited Epstein's island, Little Saint James, in January 2003. The flight logs of Epstein's private jets indicate Band has traveled on the airplane 26 times, including two flights on 14 June 2003, together with Epstein and Ghislaine Maxwell, but without Clinton.

Band negotiated with the Obama administration to appoint then-Senator Hillary Clinton to become Secretary of State. Band also traveled with former President Clinton to North Korea to orchestrate the release of American journalists Laura Ling and Euna Lee from captivity on August 4, 2009.

According to emails from 2009 and 2011 published by Wikileaks Band wrote a memo accusing Bill Clinton, Chelsea Clinton, and her husband Marc Mezvinsky of conflicts of interest, with the latter raising money for his hedge fund from Clinton foundation donors and friends. In 2011, Chelsea Clinton accused Band of having conflicts of interest between his work at the Clinton Foundation and Teneo Consulting. According to Politico, the dispute eventually "degenerated" into a "dust-up" between Doug Band and Chelsea Clinton. Band resigned from working for the Clintons in 2012, with his relationship with them also becoming estranged.

Band was on the Coca-Cola Company International Advisory Board and on the Vote Vets advisory board. He is on the Georgetown University Board of Regents and the board of Boys and Girls Club, and is a trustee at the Oklahoma City National Memorial & Museum, and on the boards of New York City Football Club, Students First, and the University of Florida Foundation. Band was a member of the board of directors for the USA Bid Committee in its failed effort to bring the FIFA World Cup to the United States in 2018 or 2022, through US Soccer. Since 2010 Band has taught a class on The Intersection of Politics and Public Service at New York University Wagner as an adjunct associate professor. Band retired from Teneo in December 2020.

== Personal life ==
Band and his wife Lily Rafii live in New York City and have three children. Bill Clinton gave a toast at Band's wedding.
