= New York City Council Jewish Caucus =

Caucus within the New York City Council

The New York City Council Jewish Caucus comprises the Jewish members of the New York City Council. The caucus is dedicated to advocating for social services, fighting Jewish poverty in New York City, supporting Israel, and advancing inter-faith relations.

== History ==
In 1991 Councilmember Herbert Berman (D-Brooklyn) formed the “Jewish Study Group” to advocate for Jewish institutional concerns to the administration of Mayor David Dinkins. In 2001 the group changed its name to the “Jewish Caucus”, and was chaired by Councilmember Michael Chaim Nelson (D-Brooklyn) from 2001-2013. Councilmember Mark D. Levine (D-Manhattan) served as chair of the caucus from 2014-2017.

== Current members ==
- Eric Dinowitz (D-Bronx) - Chair
- Julie Menin (D-Manhattan)
- Lincoln Restler (D-Brooklyn)
- Lynn Schulman (D-Queens)
- Inna Vernikov (R-Brooklyn)
- Harvey Epstein (D-Manhattan)
- Simcha Felder (D-Brooklyn)

== Former members ==
- Andy Cohen (D-Bronx)
- Chaim Deutsch (D-Brooklyn)
- Daniel Garodnick (D-Manhattan)
- David G. Greenfield (D-Brooklyn)
- Barry Grodenchik (D-Queens)
- Ari Kagan (R-Brooklyn)
- Ben Kallos (D-Manhattan)
- Karen Koslowitz (D-Queens)
- Rory Lancman (D-Queens)
- Brad Lander (D-Brooklyn)
- Stephen Levin (D-Brooklyn)
- Mark D. Levine (D-Manhattan)
- Alan Maisel (D-Brooklyn)
- Michael Chaim Nelson (D-Brooklyn)
- Helen Rosenthal (D-Manhattan)
- Mark Treyger (D-Brooklyn)

== See also ==
- Congressional Jewish Caucus, similar caucus in the U.S. Congress
