= New York City's 48th City Council district =

- Boundaries following the 2020 census

Government
  - Councilmember: . Inna Vernikov. R–Sheepshead Bay

Population (2010)
  - Total: 158,086

Demographics
  - White: 71%
  - Asian: 14%
  - Hispanic: 9%
  - Black: 4%
  - Other: 2%

Registration
  - Democratic: 45.1%
  - Republican: 24.0%
  - No party preference: 28.0%
- Registered voters (2021) 102,320

New York City's 48th City Council district is one of 51 districts in the New York City Council. It has been represented by Republican Inna Vernikov since December 2021.

== Geography ==
District 48 covers a series of neighborhoods – many of them with large Orthodox Jewish populations – in southern Brooklyn, including Brighton Beach, Homecrest, Manhattan Beach, parts of Midwood and Sheepshead Bay, and a small section of Coney Island.

The district overlaps with Brooklyn Community Boards 13, 14, and 15, and with New York's 8th, 9th, and 11th congressional districts. It also overlaps with the 17th, 19th, 22nd, and 23rd districts of the New York State Senate, and with the 41st, 42nd, 45th, 46th, and 48th districts of the New York State Assembly.

== Members representing the district ==
Members	Party	Years served	Electoral history
District established January 1, 1992
Anthony Weiner (Park Slope)	Democratic	January 1, 1992 – December 31, 1998	Elected in 1991. Re-elected in 1993. Re-elected in 1997. Resigned when elected to the U.S. House of Representatives.
Vacant		December 31, 1998 – February 17, 1999	
Michael C. Nelson (Sheepshead Bay)	Democratic	February 17, 1999 – December 31, 2013	Elected to finish Weiner's term. Re-elected in 1999. Re-elected in 2001. Re-elected in 2003. Re-elected in 2005. Re-elected in 2009. Termed out.
Chaim Deutsch (Brighton Beach)	Democratic	January 1, 2014 – April 27, 2021	Elected in 2013. Re-elected in 2017. Expelled due to tax fraud guilty plea.
Vacant		April 27, 2021 – December 1, 2021	
Inna Vernikov (Sheepshead Bay)	Republican	December 1, 2021 –	Elected to finish Deutsch's term. Re-elected in 2021. Re-elected in 2023. Re-elected in 2025.

== Recent election results ==
=== 2025 ===
2025 New York City Council election, District 48
Primary election
Party	Candidate	Votes	%
Republican	Inna Vernikov (incumbent)	2,637	65.4
Republican	Ari Kagan	1,371	34.0
Write-in		23	0.6
Total votes		4,031	100.0
General election
Republican	Inna Vernikov	26,161	
Conservative	Inna Vernikov	4,137	
Total	Inna Vernikov (incumbent)	30,298	97.6
Write-in		739	2.4
Total votes		31,037	100.0
Republican hold			

=== 2023 (redistricting) ===
Due to redistricting and the 2020 changes to the New York City Charter, councilmembers elected during the 2021 and 2023 City Council elections will serve two-year terms, with full four-year terms resuming after the 2025 New York City Council elections.

2023 New York City Council election, District 48
Primary election
Party	Candidate	Votes	%
Republican	Inna Vernikov (incumbent)	1,730	70.6
Republican	Igor Kazatsker	707	24.8
Write-in		15	0.6
Total votes		2,452	100
General election
Republican	Inna Vernikov	7,416	
Conservative	Inna Vernikov	820	
Total	Inna Vernikov (incumbent)	8,236	66.8
Democratic	Amber Adler	2,906	
We the People	Amber Adler	123	
Total	Amber Adler	3,029	24.6
Team Trump	Igor Kazatsker	1,002	8.1
Write-in		67	0.5
Total votes		12,334	100.0
Republican hold			

=== 2021 ===
In 2019, voters in New York City approved Ballot Question 1, which implemented ranked-choice voting in all local elections. Under the new system, voters have the option to rank up to five candidates for every local office. Voters whose first-choice candidates fare poorly will have their votes redistributed to other candidates in their ranking until one candidate surpasses the 50 percent threshold. If one candidate surpasses 50 percent in first-choice votes, then ranked-choice tabulations will not occur.

2021 New York City Council election, District 48 Democratic primary
Party	Candidate	Maximum round	Maximum votes	Share in maximum round	Maximum votes First round votes Transfer votes
Democratic	Steven Saperstein	5	4,542	57.1%	
Democratic	Mariya Markh	5	3,416	42.9%	
Democratic	Amber Adler	4	2,004	23.2%	
Democratic	Binyomin Bendet	3	1,589	17.6%	
Democratic	Heshy Tischler	2	463	5.0%	
Write-in		1	68	0.7%	

An interactive map of District 48

2021 New York City Council election, District 48 general election
Party	Candidate	Votes	%
Republican	Inna Vernikov	12,190	
Conservative	Inna Vernikov	773	
Total	Inna Vernikov	12,963	61.5
Democratic	Steven Saperstein	8,038	38.1
Write-in		51	0.4
Total votes		21,052	100
Republican gain from Democratic			

=== 2017 ===
2017 New York City Council election, District 48
Primary election
Party	Candidate	Votes	%
Democratic	Chaim Deutsch (incumbent)	3,759	80.8
Democratic	Marat Filler	870	18.7
Write-in		21	0.5
Total votes		4,650	100
General election
Democratic	Chaim Deutsch (incumbent)	10,461	61.5
Republican	Steve Saperstein	5,519	
Conservative	Steve Saperstein	751	
Reform	Steve Saperstein	239	
Total	Steve Saperstein	6,509	38.3
Write-in		46	0.3
Total votes		17,016	100
Democratic hold			

=== 2013 ===
2013 New York City Council election, District 48
Primary election
Party	Candidate	Votes	%
Democratic	Chaim Deutsch	3,317	34.8
Democratic	Ari Kagan	2,912	30.5
Democratic	Theresa Scavo	1,735	18.2
Democratic	Igor Oberman	1,338	14.0
Democratic	Natraj Bhushan	240	2.5
Write-in		0	0.0
Total votes		9,542	100
General election
Democratic	Chaim Deutsch	10,169	49.6
Republican	David Storobin	6,388	
Conservative	David Storobin	976	
Independence	David Storobin	294	
Total	David Storobin	7,608	37.1
Write-in	Gregory Davidzon	1,424	6.9
Working Families	Igor Oberman	913	4.5
Write-in		247	1.2
ForwardBrooklyn	Andrew Lotovsky	147	0.7
Total votes		20,508	100
Democratic hold			
