= Carl Kruger =

American politician

Member of the New York State Senate
- In office February 16, 1994 – December 20, 2011
- Preceded by: Donald Halperin
- Succeeded by: David Storobin
- Constituency: 21st district (1994-2002); 27th district (2003-2011)

Personal details
- Born: December 3, 1949 (age 76) Brooklyn, New York, U.S.
- Party: Democratic

Carl Kruger (born December 3, 1949) is an American politician from New York. A Democrat from Brooklyn, he represented District 27 in the New York State Senate. Kruger was first elected to the State Senate in 1994 and later became Chair of the Senate Social Service Committee and the Senate Finance Committee. In December 2011, he resigned from the State Senate and pleaded guilty to federal corruption charges. In 2012, Kruger was sentenced to seven years in prison.

== New York State Senate ==
First elected to the New York State Senate in a 1994 special election, Kruger represented Senate District 27 in Brooklyn. In February 2007, then-Senate Majority Leader Joseph Bruno—a Republican—appointed Kruger Chair of the Senate Social Services Committee, making him the first minority party senator to chair a committee in New York history. Kruger later chaired the powerful Senate Finance Committee.

In February 2007, Kruger presented legislation attempting to ban the use of electronic devices, such as mp3 players and mobile phones, in New York City crosswalks.

Kruger, along with Sens. Rubén Díaz Sr. (Bronx), Pedro Espada Jr. (Bronx), and Hiram Monserrate (Queens), threatened to abandon the Democratic majority that was elected to the New York State Senate on November 4, 2008. The self-named "Gang of Four" refused to back Malcolm Smith of Queens as the chamber's majority leader and sought concessions. Monserrate soon rejoined the caucus after reaching an agreement with Smith that reportedly included the chairmanship of the Consumer Affairs Committee. The remaining "Gang of Three" reached an initial compromise in early December that collapsed within a week, but was ultimately resolved with Smith becoming majority leader.

On December 2, 2009, Kruger was one of eight Democrats to vote against a same-sex marriage bill that failed to pass the Senate. On June 13, 2011, it was announced that he, Joseph Addabbo Jr. and Shirley Huntley had switched their intentions from "against" to "for" a pending same-sex marriage bill. Kruger voted in favor of the Marriage Equality Act in 2011; the bill passed the Senate and was signed into law by Gov. Andrew Cuomo.

In 2011, Kruger introduced a bill "that would ban the use of mobile phones, iPods or other electronic devices while crossing streets — runners and other exercisers included."

== Federal prosecution and guilty plea ==
On June 25, 2010, The New York Times revealed that the FBI and the U.S. Attorney's Office in Brooklyn were investigating Kruger for allegedly seeking campaign contributions in exchange for political favors. On March 9, 2011, Kruger was indicted on charges of bribery and profiting from a hospital merger he supported. On March 10, 2011, Kruger was among eight individuals (including William Boyland Jr., another New York State Assemblyman) who "surrendered to face charges in a federal corruption case accusing the lawmakers of taking bribes over the course of a decade in schemes large and small." According to The New York Times:

Kruger is accused of “receiving a stream of bribes totaling at least $1 million in exchange for taking official actions.” Among the charges in the complaint is that he shared fees paid to the lobbyist, Richard Lipsky, and then took “the very official acts in favor of which Lipsky had been paid to lobby." . . . [T]he detailed 53-page complaint portrays Senator Kruger as a lawmaker who offered a full range of corrupt services in exchange for bribe payments, performing official acts that included sponsoring and supporting legislation, lobbying other elected officials and directing state monies for the benefit of Mr. Lipsky and the lobbyist’s clients.

Kruger allegedly used the money to "bankroll a lavish lifestyle, financing a four-door Bentley Arnage and a $2 million waterfront home originally built for Anthony Casso, a boss of the Lucchese crime family."

On December 20, 2011, Kruger pleaded guilty to two counts of conspiracy to commit mail and wire fraud and two counts of bribery conspiracy. He faced up to 50 years in prison. Michael Turano, a co-conspirator described as Kruger's "secret longtime companion," pleaded guilty to one count of conspiracy to commit bribery and was sentenced to two years in prison.

On April 26, 2012, Judge Jed S. Rakoff sentenced Kruger to seven years in federal prison.

=== After release ===
The Federal Bureau of Prisons' Inmate Locator lists Kruger as released since August 3, 2018.

In January 2019, a blog covering Brooklyn politics spotted Kruger at a meeting of Community Board 18. The District Manager of the Community Board at the time was Dorothy Turano, who is mother of Kruger's co-conspirator and partner Michael Turano.

In April 2019, a small business owner applying for a liquor license complained to the Brooklyn Paper that Kruger threatened her at the Board meeting. Kruger assailed a New York City Department of City Planning representative at a June 2019 Community Board meeting, in a manner one observer called "stumping."

== Personal life ==
Kruger has stated that he was raised by his mother, a single parent, in a low-income environment. He has further indicated that his mother attempted to give him up for adoption as an infant, but that his potential adoptive parents changed their minds and sent him back to his mother. Kruger is Jewish.

Kruger is a close friend of the Turano family, which includes longtime Democratic activist Dorothy Turano and her sons, Michael and Gerard Turano. The gay marriage issue affected Kruger's personal life; Dorothy Turano has a gay nephew who cut off contact with both her and Kruger after Kruger voted against a same-sex marriage bill in 2009. Kruger voted in favor of same-sex marriage in 2011.

According to Salon.com, as they investigated Kruger for bribery, the FBI "learned that he lived with his longtime male partner [Michael Turano] while pretending (or at least allowing people to believe) that his partner's mother [Dorothy Turano] was his girlfriend." Kruger has publicly denied being gay; however, the federal government produced wiretap evidence of "nearly daily" contact between the two men, including "baby talk" and a reminiscence by Turano of Kruger's declaration of love for him. Kruger and Michael Turano asked to serve their sentences at the same detention facility, but their request was denied.

New York State Senate
Preceded by Donald Halperin	New York State Senate, 21st District; 1994–2002	Succeeded by Kevin Parker
Preceded by Thomas Duane	New York State Senate, 27th District; 2003–2011	Succeeded by David Storobin
Political offices
Preceded by Owen H. Johnson	Chairman of the Senate Finance Committee; 2009–2010	Succeeded by John DeFrancisco
