= Jerry Nadler =

American politician and lawyer (born 1947)

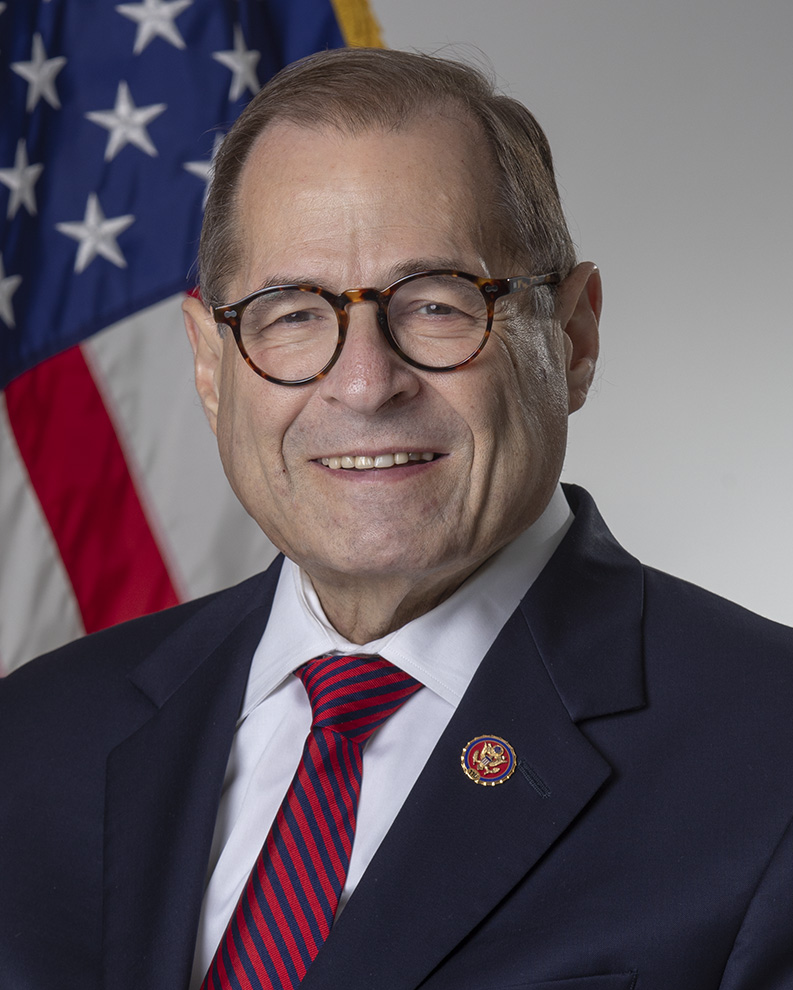
- Official portrait, 2019

Ranking Member of the House Judiciary Committee
- In office January 3, 2023 – January 3, 2025
- Preceded by: Jim Jordan
- Succeeded by: Jamie Raskin
- In office December 20, 2017 – January 3, 2019
- Preceded by: John Conyers
- Succeeded by: Doug Collins

Chair of the House Judiciary Committee
- In office January 3, 2019 – January 3, 2023
- Preceded by: Bob Goodlatte
- Succeeded by: Jim Jordan

Member of the U.S. House of Representatives from New York
- Incumbent
- Assumed office November 3, 1992 (Note: Nadler's official service begins on the date of the special election, while the House was adjourned sine die until the start of the next Congress on January 3, 1993.)
- Preceded by: Ted Weiss
- Constituency: 17th district (1992–1993); 8th district (1993–2013); 10th district (2013–2023); 12th district (2023–present)

Member of the New York State Assembly
- In office January 1, 1977 – November 3, 1992
- Preceded by: Albert H. Blumenthal
- Succeeded by: Scott Stringer
- Constituency: 69th district (1977–1982); 67th district (1983–1992)

Personal details
- Born: Jerrold Lewis Nadler; June 13, 1947 (age 79) New York City, U.S.
- Party: Democratic
- Other political affiliations: Democratic Socialists of America (before 1999)
- Spouse: Joyce Langsdorr Miller (m. 1976)
- Children: 1
- Education: Columbia University (BA); Fordham University (JD)
- Website: House website Campaign website
- Nadler's voice Nadler on Mario Cuomo, former Governor of New York. Recorded January 12, 2015

Jerrold Lewis Nadler (/ˈnædlər/; born June 13, 1947) is an American lawyer and politician from the state of New York. A resident of Manhattan's Upper West Side and a member of the Democratic Party, he has served as a U.S. representative since 1992. From 1992 until 2022, Nadler's district covered the west side of Manhattan and parts of Brooklyn, being numbered the 17th district, then the 8th district, and then the 10th district starting in 2013. Since 2023, he has represented the 12th district, which covers both the west and east sides of Manhattan from 14th Street to 100th Street. Before his election to Congress, he served eight terms as a New York state assemblyman. Nadler is the dean of New York's U.S. House delegation and is known for his liberal record and close local ties.

In September 2025, Nadler announced that he would not seek reelection in 2026. State Assemblyman Micah Lasher, whom Nadler endorsed to be his successor, went on to win the Democratic primary, considered tantamount to victory in the district.

== Early life, education, and early political career ==
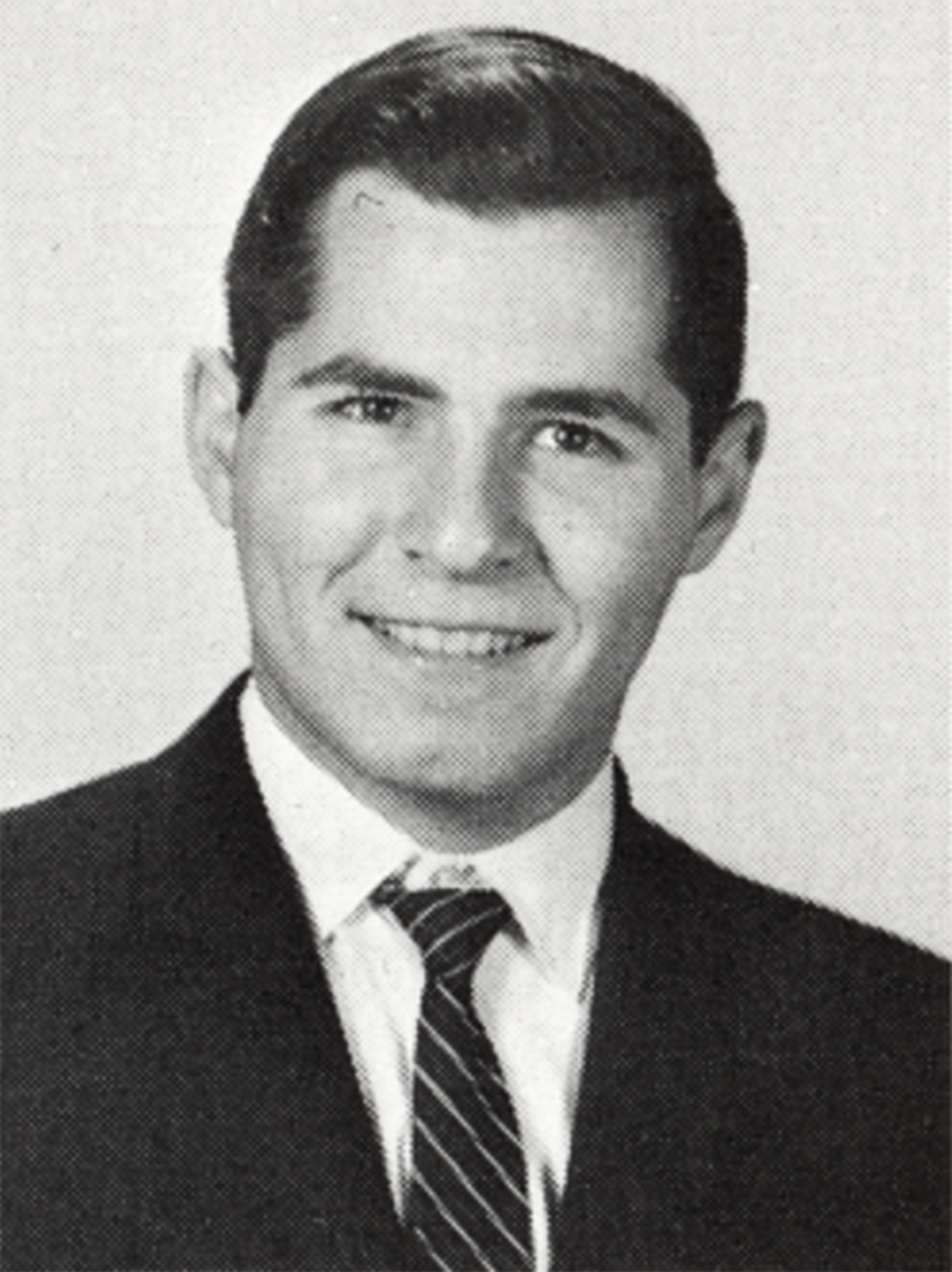
Nadler in the Stuyvesant High School yearbook, 1965

Jerrold Lewis Nadler was born into a Jewish family in Brooklyn on June 13, 1947, the son of Miriam (née Schreiber) and Emanuel "Max" Nadler. Nadler described his father as a "dyed-in-the-wool Democrat" who lost his poultry farm in New Jersey when the younger Nadler was seven. In his youth, he attended Crown Heights Yeshiva; as of 2018, he was the only member of Congress with a yeshiva education. He graduated from Stuyvesant High School in 1965. In high school, his debate team partner was future philosopher of science Alexander Rosenberg, and Dick Morris managed his successful campaign for student government president.

Nadler received his B.A. in 1969 from Columbia University, where he became a brother of Alpha Epsilon Pi. After graduating from Columbia, Nadler worked as a legal assistant and clerk, first with Corporation Trust Company in 1970, then the Morris, Levin and Shein law firm in 1971. In 1972, Nadler was a legislative assistant in the New York State Assembly before becoming shift manager at the New York City Off-Track Betting Corporation, a position he held until becoming a law clerk with Morgan, Finnegan, Pine, Foley and Lee in 1976.

While attending evening courses at the Fordham University School of Law, Nadler was elected to the New York State Assembly in 1976. He completed his J.D. at Fordham in 1978.

== New York State Assembly ==
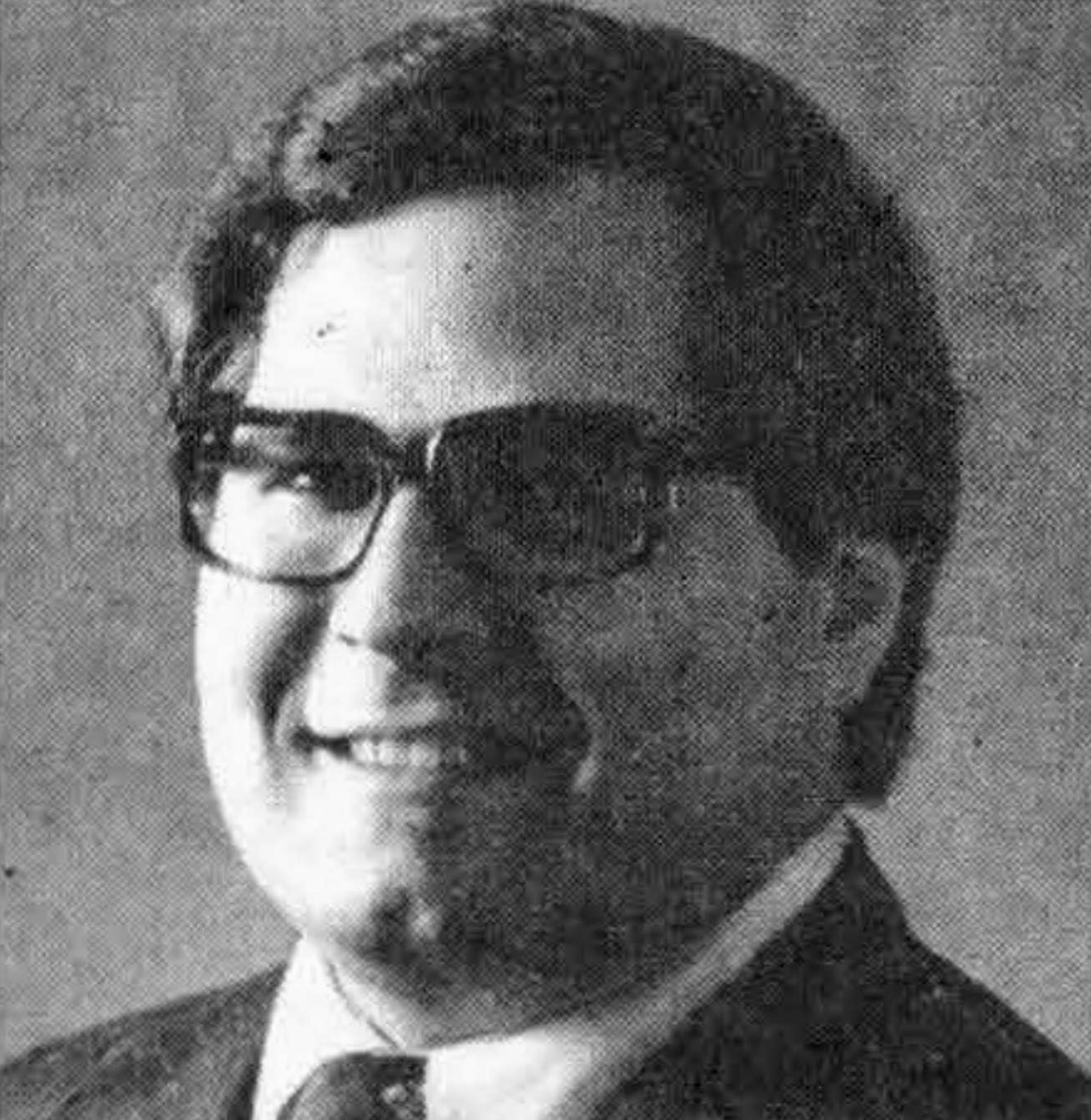
Nadler c. 1980

Nadler was a member of the New York State Assembly from 1977 to 1992, sitting in the 182nd, 183rd, 184th, 185th, 186th, 187th, 188th and 189th New York State Legislatures. He was a member of the Democratic Socialist Organizing Committee and its successor, the Democratic Socialists of America. He was active in the organization as late as 1999.

In 1985, Nadler ran for Manhattan Borough President. He lost the Democratic primary to David Dinkins. In the general election, he ran as the New York Liberal Party nominee, and again lost to Dinkins.

In 1989, he ran for New York City Comptroller, but lost to Kings County D.A. and former U.S. representative Elizabeth Holtzman in the Democratic primary.

Nadler founded and chaired the Assembly Subcommittee on Mass Transit and Rail Freight.

== U.S. House of Representatives ==
=== Elections ===
In 1992, Democratic representative Ted Weiss was expected to run for reelection in the 8th district, which had been renumbered from the 17th after the 1990 U.S. census. However, Weiss died a day before the primary election, and Nadler was nominated to replace Weiss. He ran in and won two elections on Election Day. He was unopposed in a special election to serve the rest of Weiss's eighth term in the old 17th district, and easily won a regular election for a full two-year term in the new 8th district.

Nadler's district was renumbered as the 10th district in 2013. From 2013 to 2023, the 10th district included Manhattan's west side from the Upper West Side down to Battery Park, including the World Trade Center; the Manhattan neighborhoods of Chelsea, Hell's Kitchen and Greenwich Village; and parts of Brooklyn, such as Coney Island, Bensonhurst, Borough Park, and Bay Ridge. It includes many of New York City's most popular tourist attractions, including the Statue of Liberty, New York Stock Exchange, Brooklyn Bridge and Central Park. He has never dropped below 75 percent of the vote in a general election; the district and its predecessors have been in Democratic hands for more than 120 years.

In 2020, Nadler faced a primary challenge from activist Lindsey Boylan; the election was the first time in his tenure that Nadler received less than 75% of the vote.

In 2022, Nadler defeated his longtime House colleague Carolyn Maloney in a three-way Democratic primary with 56% of the vote after he and Maloney were both drawn into the newly-drawn 12th district during redistricting. Nadler won the 2022 general election in the 12th district as well.

=== Tenure ===
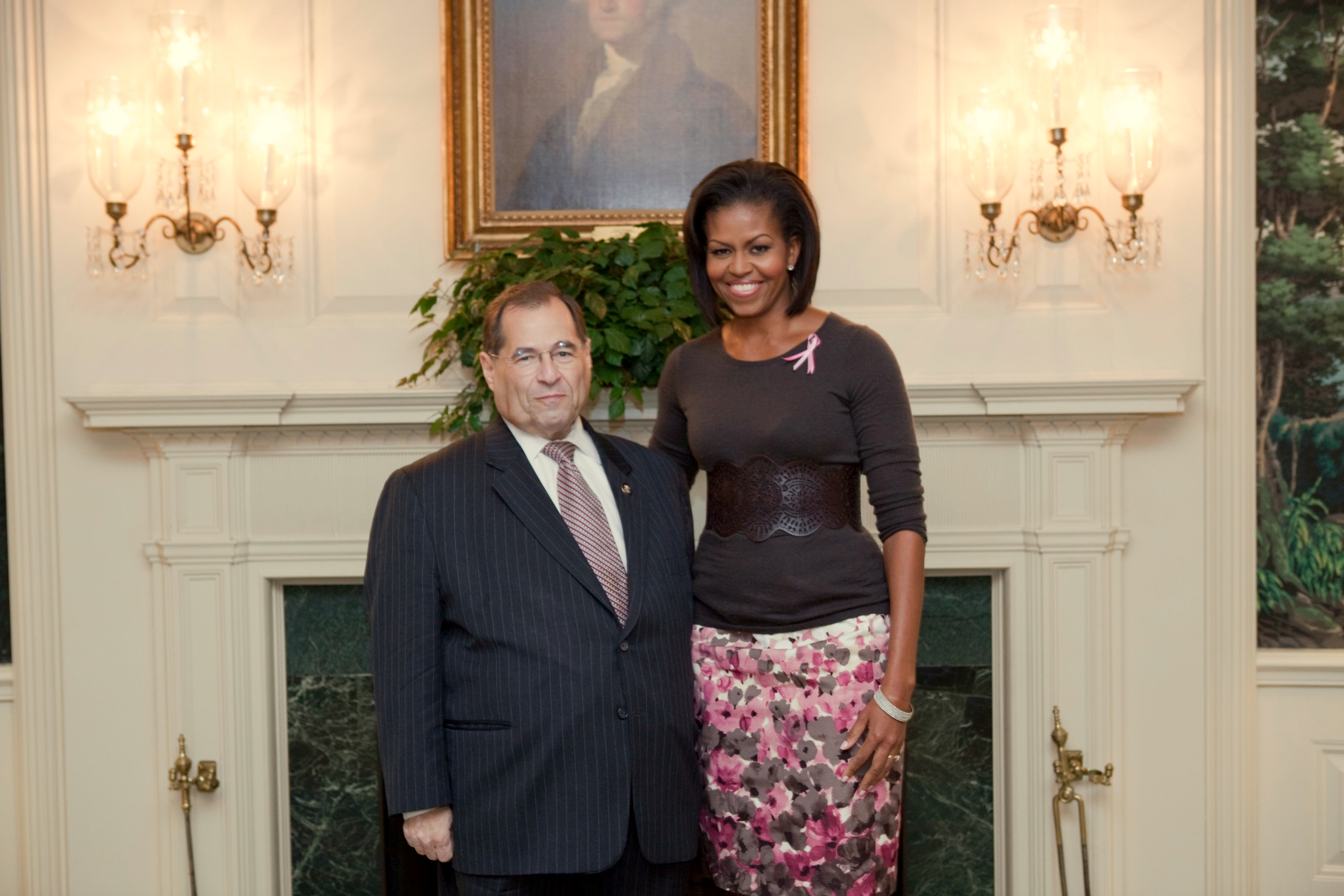
Nadler with First Lady Michelle Obama in 2009

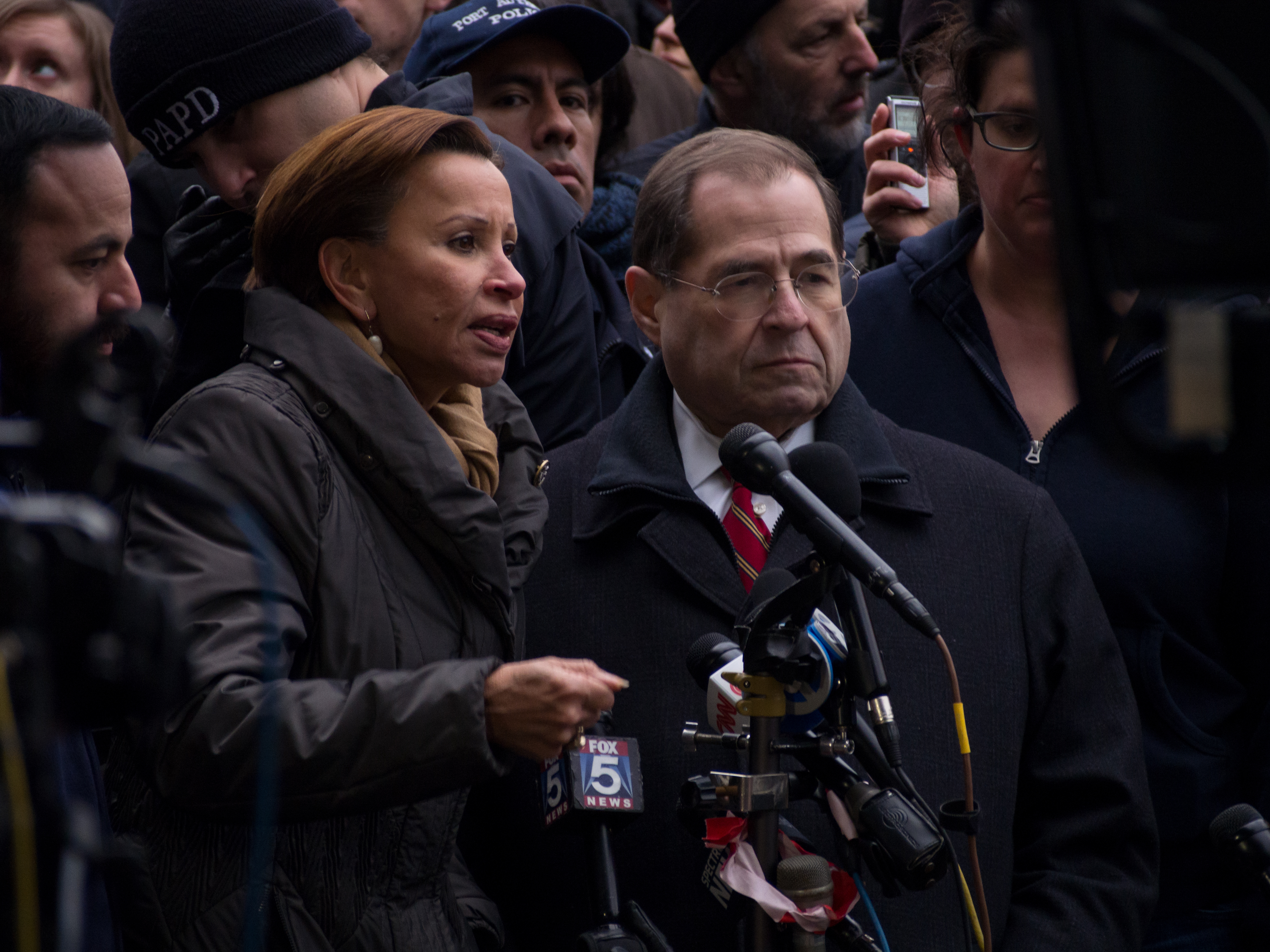
Nadler giving a press conference with Nydia Velázquez at the 2017 John F. Kennedy International Airport protest

Nadler is a member of the House Transportation and Infrastructure Committee.

Despite earlier efforts to impeach George W. Bush and more recent requests from fellow representatives, he did not schedule hearings on impeachments for Bush or Dick Cheney, saying in 2007 that doing so would be pointless and would distract from the presidential election. In an interview in Washington Journal on July 15, 2008, Nadler reiterated the timing argument and endorsed Barack Obama in the 2008 presidential election, saying that electing an honest candidate would create a greater chance of prosecuting those in the Bush administration who had committed war crimes.

Nadler chaired the House Judiciary Committee from 2019 to 2023, and was its ranking member from 2023 to 2025. At the end of 2024, he intended to run for another two-year term in the role, but pulled out of the race after Jamie Raskin challenged him for the seat.

On a similar note, referring to hypothetical impeachment proceedings against President Donald Trump that would begin in the newly elected Democrat-controlled House, he suggested a "three-pronged test" that "would make for a legitimate impeachment proceeding". Such a test would include "the offenses in question must be so grave", and "the evidence so clear", that "even some supporters of the president concede that impeachment is necessary". If it was determined that the president committed an impeachable offense, lawmakers must consider if such an offense would "rise to the gravity where it's worth putting the country through the trauma of an impeachment proceeding," Nadler said.

On September 24, 2019, Representative Lance Gooden proposed a resolution to remove Nadler from his position as chair of the House Judiciary committee, accusing him of unlawfully beginning impeachment proceedings before the House had given the committee authorization.

Nadler served as an impeachment manager (prosecutor) during the first impeachment trial of President Trump.

For his tenure as chair of the House Judiciary Committee in the 116th Congress, Nadler earned an "A" grade from the non-partisan Lugar Center's Congressional Oversight Hearing Index.

PolitiFact criticized Nadler for incorrectly claiming following the Kenosha unrest shooting that Kyle Rittenhouse had taken a gun across state lines and might thus be subject to a federal Department of Justice review, when in fact he had not.

Nadler is the dean of New York's congressional delegation.

On May 28, 2025 an aide at Nadler's district office in New York City was detained and handcuffed by Department of Homeland Security officers. The officers accused Nadler's staffers of "harboring rioters" and demanded access to his office, claiming that they didn't need a warrant, which Nadler says is incorrect. After the officers conducted a security check of the office, the aide was later released with no charges filed and Nadler is demanding that there be a congressional investigation into the incident and that Secretary of Homeland Security Kristi Noem testify.

=== Committee assignments ===
==== Current ====
- Committee on the Judiciary
  - Subcommittee on Immigration Integrity, Security, and Enforcement
  - Subcommittee on The Administrative State, Regulatory Reform, and Antitrust
- United States House Committee on Transportation and Infrastructure
  - Subcommittee on Highways and Transit
  - Subcommittee on Railroads, Pipelines, and Hazardous Materials

==== Former ====
- Committee on Transportation and Infrastructure
  - Subcommittee on Highways and Transit
  - Subcommittee on Railroads, Pipelines, and Hazardous Materials

=== Caucus memberships ===
- Congressional Arts Caucus
- Black Maternal Health Caucus
- Congressional Jewish Caucus (co-chair)
- Congressional Progressive Caucus
- Congressional Asian Pacific American Caucus
- Medicare for All Caucus
- House Pro-Choice Caucus
- Congressional Coalition on Adoption
- Congressional Caucus for the Equal Rights Amendment
- Congressional Equality Caucus
- Rare Disease Caucus
- Congressional Freethought Caucus

== Political positions ==
=== Surveillance ===
Nadler was unhappy with the passage of the surveillance-reform compromise bill, the FISA of 1978 Amendments Act of 2008, saying it "abandons the Constitution's protections and insulates lawless behavior from legal scrutiny".

=== Income taxes ===
Nadler compared Obama's acceptance of Republican demands to extend the Bush tax cuts at the highest income levels to someone's being roughed up by the Mob, asserting that the Republicans would allow the middle class tax cut only if millionaires and billionaires receive a long-term tax cut as well.

Nadler has proposed changing the income tax brackets to reflect different regions and their costs of living, which would have lowered the tax rate for New Yorkers. He has opposed tax breaks for high-income earners, saying that the country cannot afford it.

=== Abortion ===
Nadler sponsored the Freedom of Choice Act in 2004 and 2007.

=== LGBT rights ===
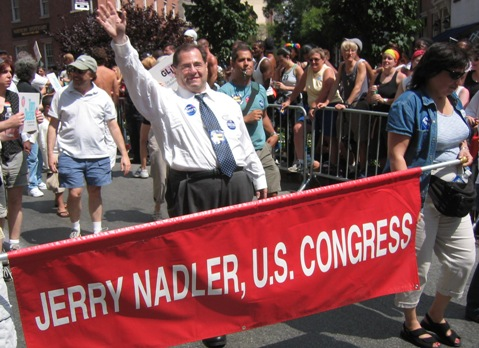
Nadler at New York City's Gay Pride parade in 2004

Nadler supports same-sex marriage, and anti-discrimination protections on the basis of sexual orientation and gender identity.

On September 15, 2009, Nadler and two other representatives introduced the Respect for Marriage Act, a proposed bill that would have repealed the Defense of Marriage Act and required the federal government to recognize the validity of same-sex marriages.

In 2019, Nadler supported the Equality Act, a bill that would expand the federal Civil Rights Act of 1964 to ban discrimination based on sexual orientation and gender identity.

=== Immigration ===
In March 2019, as the House debated President Trump's veto of a measure unwinding his declaration of a national emergency at the southern border, Nadler said: "I'm convinced that the president's actions are unlawful and deeply irresponsible. A core foundation of our system of government and of democracies across the world, going back hundreds of years, is that the executive cannot unilaterally spend taxpayer money without the legislature's consent."

=== Iran ===
In 2015, Nadler voted to support an agreement to lift economic sanctions against Iran in exchange for Iran's compliance with the terms of the agreement which called for substantial dismantling and scaling back of their nuclear program.

=== Israel ===
Nadler describes himself as a “committed Zionist” and a strong supporter of Israel as a homeland for Jewish people.

Of Trump's decision to recognize Jerusalem as the capital of Israel in December 2017, Nadler said, "I have long recognized Jerusalem as the historic capital of Israel, and have called for the eventual relocation of the United States Embassy to Jerusalem, the seat of the Israeli government. While President Trump's announcement earlier today rightly acknowledged the unique attachment of the Jewish people to Jerusalem, the timing and circumstances surrounding this decision are deeply worrying."

In 2025, he spoke out against aggressive policing of pro-Palestinian protests.

=== Housing ===
In 2020, Nadler praised a judge for a ruling that could lead to the removal of 20 or more stories in an already-constructed 52-story luxury high-rise building on the Upper West Side of Manhattan. The developer had received a permit to construct the building, but the judge said the permit should not have been given. In March 2021, the N.Y.S. Appellate Division unanimously reversed and ruled in favor of the developers, finding that the building permit was lawful and that the trial court should have deferred to the N.Y.C. Board of Appeals. Opponents sought leave to appeal to the N.Y. Court of Appeals. On September 9, 2021, the N.Y. Court of Appeals denied the opposition group’s motion for leave to appeal.

=== Climate change ===
In April 2023, Nadler was one of the 95 co-sponsors of H.Res.319, which calls for the creation of a Green New Deal.

=== Cannabis ===
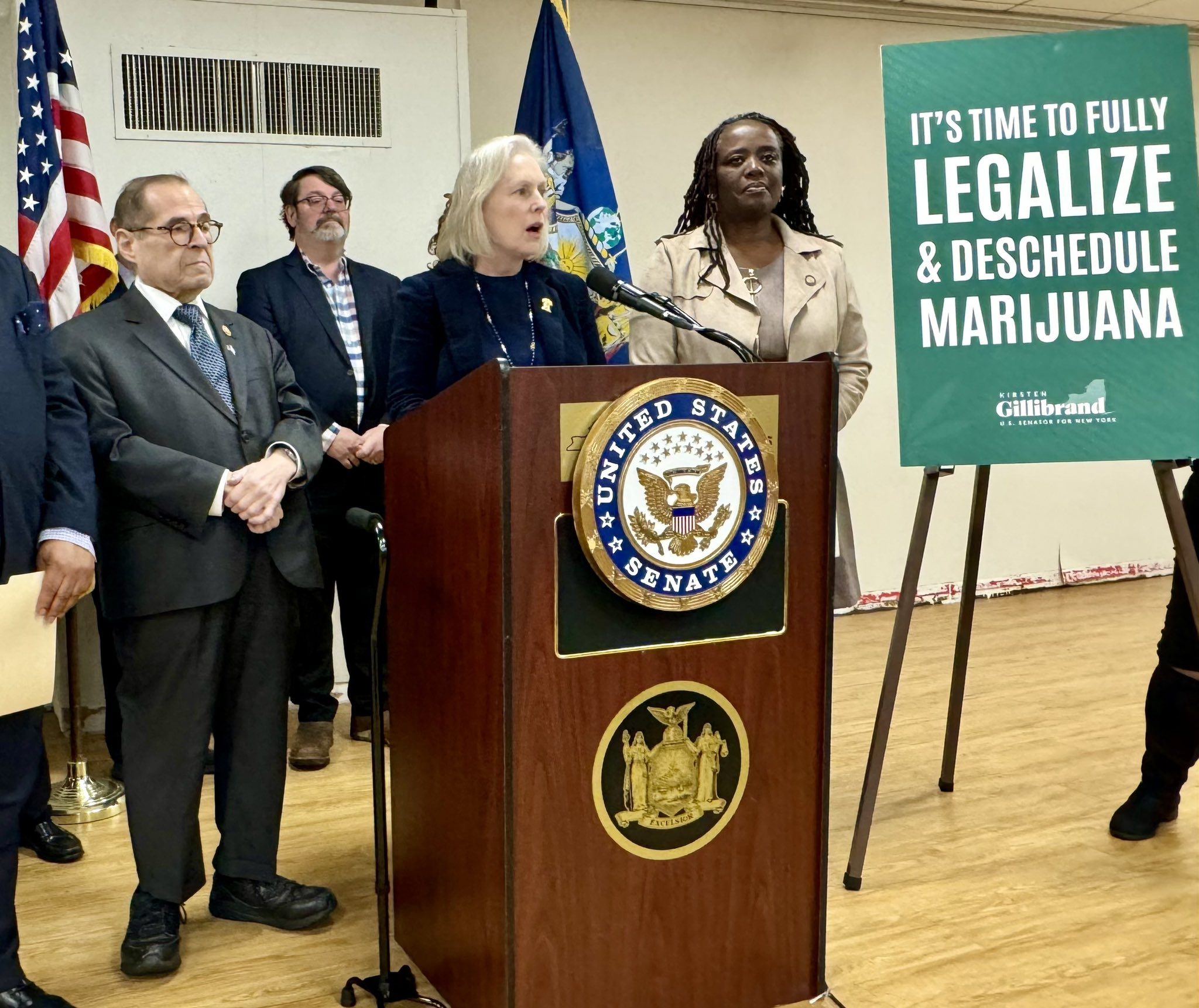
Nadler calls for the Biden administration to deschedule cannabis at a press conference with Senator Kirsten Gillibrand in 2024.

Nadler introduced the Marijuana Opportunity Reinvestment and Expungement (MORE) Act in July 2019 to legalize cannabis at the federal level by removing it from the Controlled Substances Act. He said: "It's past time to right this wrong nationwide and work to view marijuana use as an issue of personal choice and public health, not criminal behavior." In November 2019, the bill passed the House Judiciary Committee by a 24–10 vote, marking the first time that a bill to end cannabis prohibition had ever passed a congressional committee. In April 2022, it passed the full House of Representatives by a 228–164 vote.

=== Fiscal Responsibility Act of 2023 ===
Nadler was among 46 Democrats who voted against final passage of the Fiscal Responsibility Act of 2023 in the House.

=== Voting record ===
Nadler has had a liberal voting record in the House. He gained national prominence during the impeachment of Bill Clinton, when he described the process as a "partisan railroad job".

His Medicare proposal includes a section that provides for a consortium of organization to study Ground Zero illness.

== Personal life ==
Nadler and Josephine Langsdorr "Joyce" Miller wed in 1976. As of 2013, they lived in Lincoln Square on the Upper West Side of Manhattan.

In 2002 and 2003, Nadler had laparoscopic duodenal switch surgery, helping him lose more than 100 pounds (45 kg).

== See also ==
- List of Jewish members of the United States Congress

U.S. House of Representatives
Preceded by Ted Weiss	Member of the U.S. House of Representatives from New York's 17th congressional district 1992–1993	Succeeded by Eliot Engel
Preceded by James H. Scheuer	Member of the U.S. House of Representatives from New York's 8th congressional district 1993–2013	Succeeded by Hakeem Jeffries
Preceded by Edolphus Towns	Member of the U.S. House of Representatives from New York's 10th congressional district 2013–2023	Succeeded by Dan Goldman
Preceded by John Conyers	Ranking Member of the House Judiciary Committee; 2017–2019	Succeeded by Doug Collins
Preceded by Carolyn Maloney	Member of the U.S. House of Representatives from New York's 12th congressional district 2023–present	Incumbent
Preceded by Bob Goodlatte	Chair of the House Judiciary Committee; 2019–2023	Succeeded by Jim Jordan
Preceded by Jim Jordan	Ranking Member of the House Judiciary Committee; 2023–2025	Succeeded by Jamie Raskin
U.S. order of precedence (ceremonial)
Preceded by Maxine Waters	United States representatives by seniority 10th	Succeeded by Sanford Bishop
Preceded by Maxine Waters	Order of precedence of the United States	Succeeded by Sanford Bishop
