= Congressional Jewish Caucus =

Caucus in the U.S. Congress of Jewish members

- Co-chairs: Jerry Nadler (NY-12); Brad Schneider (IL-10)
- Founded: February 6, 2025; 20 months ago
- Ideology: Opposition to antisemitism
- Seats in the House: 21 / 435
- Seats in the House Democratic Caucus: 21 / 213
- Seats in the House Republican Caucus: 0 / 220

The Congressional Jewish Caucus is an organization of members of the United States Congress who are American Jews. The caucus focused on issues affecting Jews and Israel, such as antisemitism and U.S.-Israel relations. The caucus first met and received official recognition in 2023 during the 118th United States Congress, spurred by increased antisemitism in the United States during the Gaza war. However, the caucus did not officially form until the 119th Congress in 2025.

== Background ==
There were 36 Jewish members of the 116th United States Congress, which sat from 2019 to 2021, an increase from 30 during the 115th United States Congress. In the 117th United States Congress, there were 26 Jewish lawmakers in the U.S House of Representatives, all but two of them members of the Democratic Party. Jews were first elected to both the Senate and the House in 1845, and have continually sat in the Senate since 1949 and in the House since 1857.

== History ==
In 2019, Jack Rosen, president of the American Jewish Congress, called for a bi-partisan Congressional Jewish Caucus as a congressional caucus, in response to increasing antisemitism, political factionalism in the Jewish community, and anti-Israel advocacy in Congress. An informal group of Jewish members of the U.S. House, almost all of them members of the Democratic Party, led by Eliot Engel and Nita Lowey, had met since at least to discuss issues such as antisemitism. However, there was no formal body similar to the New York City Council Jewish Caucus and the California Legislative Jewish Caucus. Following controversial comments by Ilhan Omar, in which she referred to Americans who supported Israel as "pushing for allegiance to a foreign country", conversations to formalize the group increased.

Citing a rising in antisemitic hate crimes and to coordinate a unified policy on U.S.–Israel relations, Jewish members of the 117th United States Congress had formed an informal Jewish caucus by May 2023. The group was led by Jerry Nadler, the longest-serving Jewish member of Congress and the dean of the Jewish delegation. The caucus met as a group with Israeli ambassador Michael Herzog during the crisis over the 2023 Israeli judicial reform.

During the 118th United States Congress, Congresswoman Debbie Wasserman Schultz filed to create a Jewish Caucus in November 2023, in the context of the Gaza war. The caucus was formally approved by the House Administration Committee. According to Wasserman Schultz, the caucus would be secular and have the purpose of seeking Jewish unity in the U.S. House. The caucus held its first meeting on December 1, 2023, convened by Wasserman Schultz. Nadler announced he would not join the caucus, citing the existence of the informal group and the "chaos" of the Gaza war. Nadler was also upset that Wasserman Schultz had apparently not consulted with all Congressional Jews before creating the caucus. David Kustoff, one of two Jewish Republicans, also did not plan to join, because he does not join caucuses in Congress.

=== 119th Congress ===
On February 6, 2025, during the 119th United States Congress, Jewish members of the House of Representatives votes to create a formal Jewish caucus for the first time. The caucus was initially chaired by Jerry Nadler and Brad Schneider, of the progressive and moderate wings of the Jewish members. The group was open to all Jewish members of the House, but only Democrats joined. On April 1, 2025, Aaron Weinberg of Rep. Jerry Nadler's office and Gil Thompson of Rep. Brad Schneider's office were named executive directors of the caucus.

== Membership ==
The caucus currently has 21 members:

- Jake Auchincloss (D–Massachusetts)
- Becca Balint (D–Vermont)
- Suzanne Bonamici (D–Oregon)
- Steve Cohen (D–Tennessee)
- Lois Frankel (D–Florida)
- Laura Friedman (D–California)
- Dan Goldman (D–New York)
- Josh Gottheimer (D–New Jersey)
- Sara Jacobs (D–California)
- Greg Landsman (D–Ohio)
- Mike Levin (D–California)
- Seth Magaziner (D–Rhode Island)
- Jared Moskowitz (D–Florida)
- Jerry Nadler (D–New York)
- Jamie Raskin (D–Maryland)
- Jan Schakowsky (D–Illinois)
- Brad Schneider (D–Illinois)
- Kim Schrier (D–Washington)
- Brad Sherman (D–California)
- Eugene Vindman (D–Virginia)
- Debbie Wasserman Schultz (D–Florida)

== See also ==
- Jewish Democratic Council of America
- List of Jewish American politicians
- List of Jewish members of the United States Congress
- List of Jewish United States Cabinet members
- New York City Council Jewish Caucus
- Republican Jewish Coalition
