= David Storobin =

American politician

Member of the New York State Senate from the 27th district
- In office June 4, 2012 – December 31, 2012
- Preceded by: Carl Kruger
- Succeeded by: Simcha Felder

Personal details
- Born: 1979 (age 46–47) Soviet Union
- Party: Republican

David Storobin (born 1979) is a New York attorney and a former New York State Senator. A Republican, Storobin represented District 27 in the New York State Senate for several months in 2012.

== Early life ==
Storobin was born in the Soviet Union in 1979 and came to the United States in 1991. He was raised by his mother after his parents divorced when he was three years old. Storobin graduated from Rutgers University School of Law.

== Career ==
Storobin is a practicing attorney specializing in criminal defense and family law. He has run The Storobin Law Firm PLLC since 2004. In 2004, he founded Global Politician, an e-zine. Material posted there later caused a bitter row between Storobin and his future political opponent, Lewis Fidler.

A Republican, Storobin ran for New York State Senate in District 27 in a March 20, 2012 special election. The Brooklyn seat was left vacant by Democrat Carl Kruger, who had resigned and pleaded guilty to corruption charges. Storobin's opponent was New York City Councilmember Lew Fidler. The campaign was described as "a vicious campaign that included charges of pedophilia, Nazism and election day allegations 'a Storobin thug' ran over a Fidler volunteer with a van". (The van allegation turned out to be false.) During his campaign, Storobin promoted education reform and legislation to help small businesses. He defeated Fidler in a close race which came down to absentee ballots. Storobin's margin of victory was 13 votes. He was sworn in as a state senator on June 4, 2012.

In November 2012, after his district was eliminated in the redistricting process, Storobin ran for State Senate in a newly created nearby district (Senate District 17, known as a "Super Jewish" district). Storobin's opponent was Democratic former New York City Councilmember Simcha Felder. Storobin faced a 4:1 party registration disadvantage, leaving him an underdog. Felder defeated Storobin by a wide margin.

On November 5, 2013, Storobin ran for the New York City Council's 48th District, losing to Democrat Chaim Deutsch.

In 2021, Storobin was the Campaign Manager for Inna Vernikov in her successful race for New York City Council.

New York State Senate
Preceded by Carl Kruger	New York State Senate; 27th District; 2012	Succeeded by Simcha Felder
