= Michael Chaim Nelson =

American politician

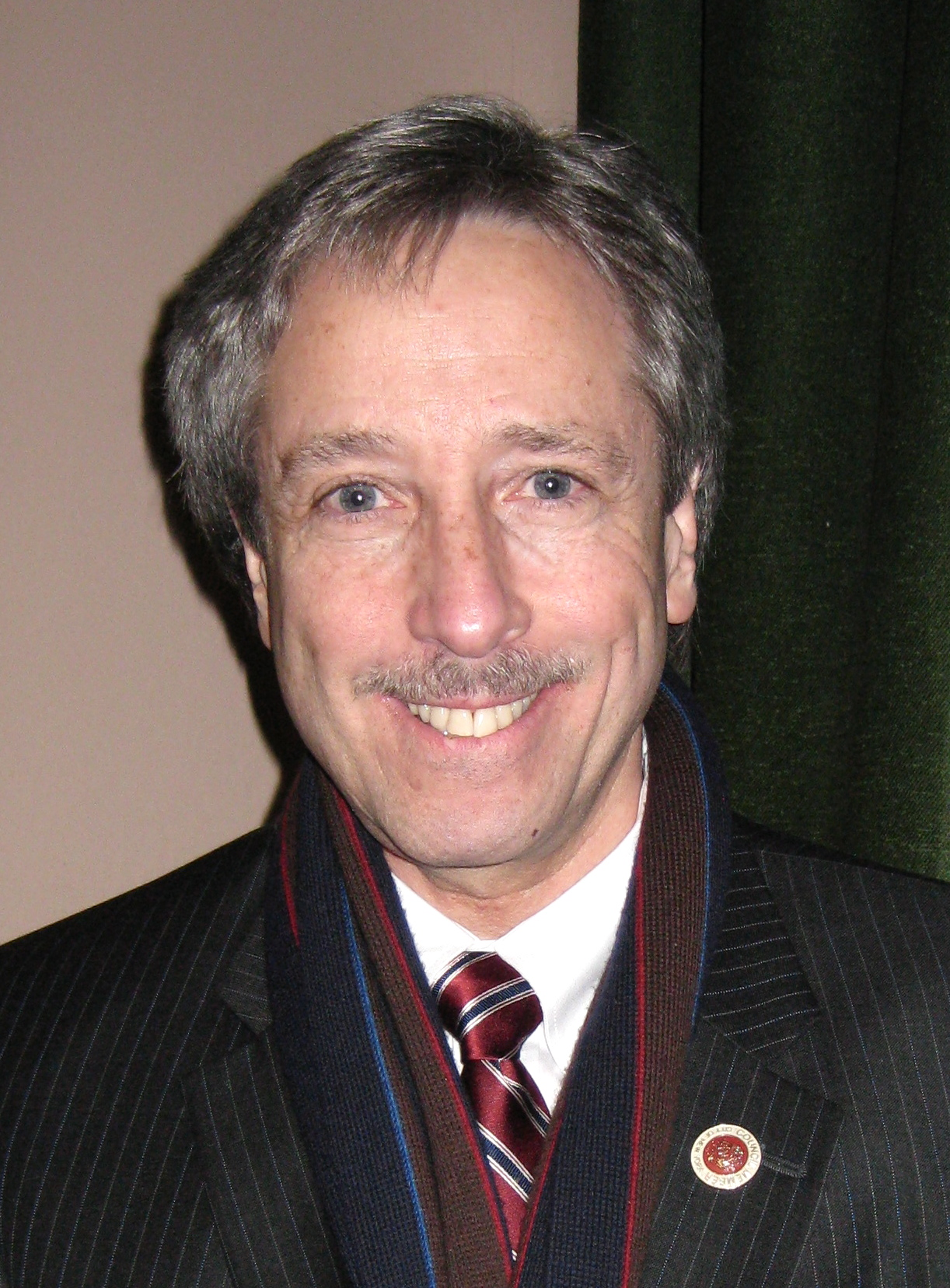

Member of the New York City Council from the 48th district
- In office February 1999 – December 31, 2013
- Preceded by: Anthony Weiner
- Succeeded by: Chaim Deutsch
- Constituency: Midwood, Sheepshead Bay, Homecrest, and Brighton Beach

Personal details
- Party: Democratic
- Website: NYC Council: District 48

Michael Chaim Nelson is a former Councilman from the New York City Council's 48th district, covering the Midwood, Sheepshead Bay, Homecrest, and Brighton Beach sections of Brooklyn.

He won the seat in 1999 after Anthony Weiner moved up to Congress to replace Chuck Schumer in the House of Representatives. Due to term limits, he left office in December 2013 and was replaced by fellow Democrat Chaim Deutsch on January 1, 2014.

Political offices
Preceded by Anthony Weiner	New York City Council, 48th district 1999–2013	Succeeded by Chaim Deutsch
