= Chaim Deutsch =

American politician (born 1969)

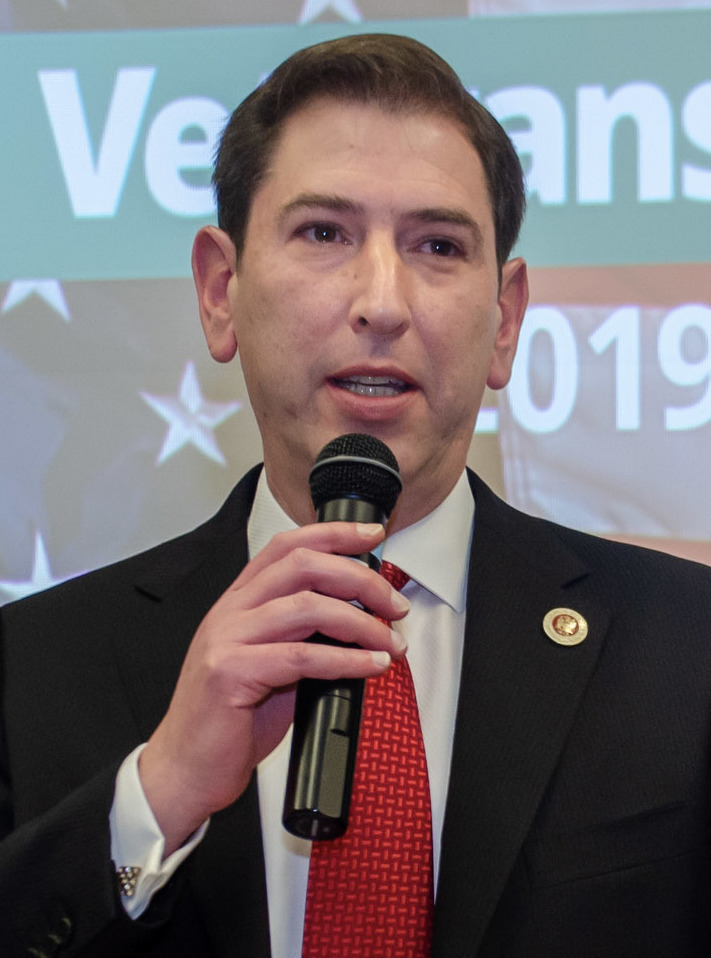

Member of the New York City Council from the 48th district
- In office January 1, 2014 – April 27, 2021
- Preceded by: Michael Chaim Nelson
- Succeeded by: Inna Vernikov

Personal details
- Born: April 15, 1969 (age 57) Long Beach, New York, U.S.
- Party: Democratic
- Spouse: Sara Deutsch
- Children: 5

Chaim M. Deutsch (born April 15, 1969) is an American politician who served as a New York City Council Member for the 48th district from 2014 to 2021. He is a Democrat. The district includes Brighton Beach, Gerritsen Beach, Gravesend, Manhattan Beach, Marine Park, Midwood, Plum Beach, and Sheepshead Bay in Brooklyn. He was expelled from City Council after his guilty plea to charges of tax fraud in April 2021.

== Personal life ==
Deutsch is the son of Romanian immigrants who were Holocaust survivors. As a teenager, his father survived three concentration camps and was liberated at Gunskirchen before coming to the United States in 1965, but never spoke about the experience. Deutsch discovered his father's Holocaust history in a book after his death.

Growing up, Deutsch lived in a small two-bedroom apartment as one of four boys. In between studying at yeshiva, Deutsch took up a number of jobs to support his family, such as making pizza in a kosher pizza shop.

He married his wife Sara at age 19 and has five children, as well as two grandchildren. He speaks English, Yiddish, and Spanish. Deutsch is an Orthodox Jew and a Kohen.

== Career ==
In 1991 at age 23, Deutsch was inspired by volunteer patrols in neighboring communities and founded the Flatbush Shomrim Safety Patrol, in which he later served as President and ran until 2010.

In 1996, he began working as a constituent liaison for Councilman Lloyd Henry and later became Chief of Operations for Councilman Michael Nelson. Deutsch also worked in real estate management and eventually founded his own firm, Chasa Management, which he had to give up after new City Council rules banned outside income for members.

Deutsch is a graduate of the New York Police Department Citizens Police Academy. Following the aftermath of Hurricane Sandy in 2012, he mobilized volunteers to evacuate residents and assist in the distribution of goods to people affected by the storm. Deutsch was elected Councilman in 2013 after defeating Theresa Scavo, lawyers Nátraj Bhushan and Igor Oberman and District Leader Ari Kagan in the Democratic primary, and then defeating David Storobin in the general election. Deutsch also served as vice president and police liaison for the Council of Jewish Organizations of Flatbush.

=== New York City Council ===
In 2014 a new Council Subcommittee on non-public Schools was created, and he was appointed its chair and only member. In January 2018 he was appointed Chair of the City Council’s Veterans Committee. In February 2018 he was unanimously elected Chair of the City Council's 14-member Jewish Caucus. In January 2019, his Holocaust Remembrance Bill passed the City Council, recognizing International Holocaust Remembrance Day in New York City on January 27, and declaring the entire week following as a citywide Holocaust Education Week.

He views himself as a "conservative Democrat." Deutsch's position has a term limit of two consecutive four-year terms.

In 2019, Deutsch decided to solely use public transportation to travel to his office following the local killing of 10-year old boy Enzo Farachio in which a car which crashed into a bus stop. At a vigil with Farachio's family, he said: “I took a big step, I gave up my own personal car, just yesterday. And I’m going to be taking mass transit as much as I can. At times I’m going to be using a family member’s car, but I’m going to make an example to others, that if you can take mass transit, leave your car at home and take mass transit. If we can cut driving by 50 percent or 75 percent or 25 percent then we accomplish something.”

After Deutsch pleaded guilty to tax fraud charges, City Council Speaker Corey Johnson announced that Deutsch had been expelled, saying, "Based on our review of the charging document and Mr. Chaim Deutsch’s plea agreement, the Council has concluded that the office of the 48th Council District has been vacated under the operation of law ... He is no longer a member of the City Council."

=== Congressional campaign 2020 ===
On January 21, 2020, Deutsch announced his intent to run against incumbent Yvette Clarke in the Democratic primary for New York's 9th congressional district. On election night, Deutsch received only 9.4% of the in-person vote in the Democratic primary on June 23, 2020. He conceded over Twitter, congratulating Clarke while also expressing concerns about voter suppression.

=== Tax fraud ===
On April 22, 2021, Deutsch pleaded guilty to tax fraud in Manhattan federal court. The charges arose from personal income tax filings for the year 2015 that included fraudulent information about business expenses related to Chasa Management, a firm that he solely owned. Deutsch failed to pay $82,076 in federal taxes from 2013 to 2015. The City Council expelled him the following week.

== Election history ==
Deutsch was elected to the New York City Council on November 5, 2013 after defeating Republican David Storobin and multiple primary opponents. He succeeded Democrat Mike Nelson, who was term-limited.

In 2017, Deutsch won re-election, after defeating both an opponent in the Democratic primary and Steve Saperstein (Republican, Conservative, and Reform Parties) in the general election.

Per official election night results, Deutsch came in fourth in the 2020 Democratic primary for New York's 9th congressional district, behind incumbent Yvette Clarke and Adem Bunkedekko.

Election history
Office	Year	Election	Results
NYC Council District 48	2013	Democratic primary	√ Chaim M. Deutsch 34.76% Ari Kagan 30.52% Theresa R. Scavo 18.18% Igor Oberman 14.02% Natraj S. Bhushan 2.52%
NYC Council District 48	2013	General	√ Chaim M. Deutsch (D) 49.59% David Storobin (R) 37.10% Igor Oberman (Working Families) 4.45% Alexander Lotovsky (Forward) .72%

Election history
Office	Year	Election	Results
NYC Council District 48	2017	Democratic primary	√ Chaim M. Deutsch 81.1% Marat Filler 18.9%
NYC Council District 48	2017	General	√ Chaim M. Deutsch (D) 61.6% Steve Saperstein (R) 38.4%

(Unofficial in-person vote results only)
Election history
Office	Year	Election	Results
New York's 9th congressional district	2020	Democratic primary	√ Yvette Clarke 62.3% Adem Bunkeddeko 17.9% Chaim Deutsch 9.4% Isiah James 9.4% Lutchi Gayot 1.0%

Political offices
Preceded by Mike Nelson	New York City Council, 48th district 2014–2021	Succeeded by Inna Vernikov
