= Inna Vernikov =

New York politician (born 1984)

- Інна Вернікова
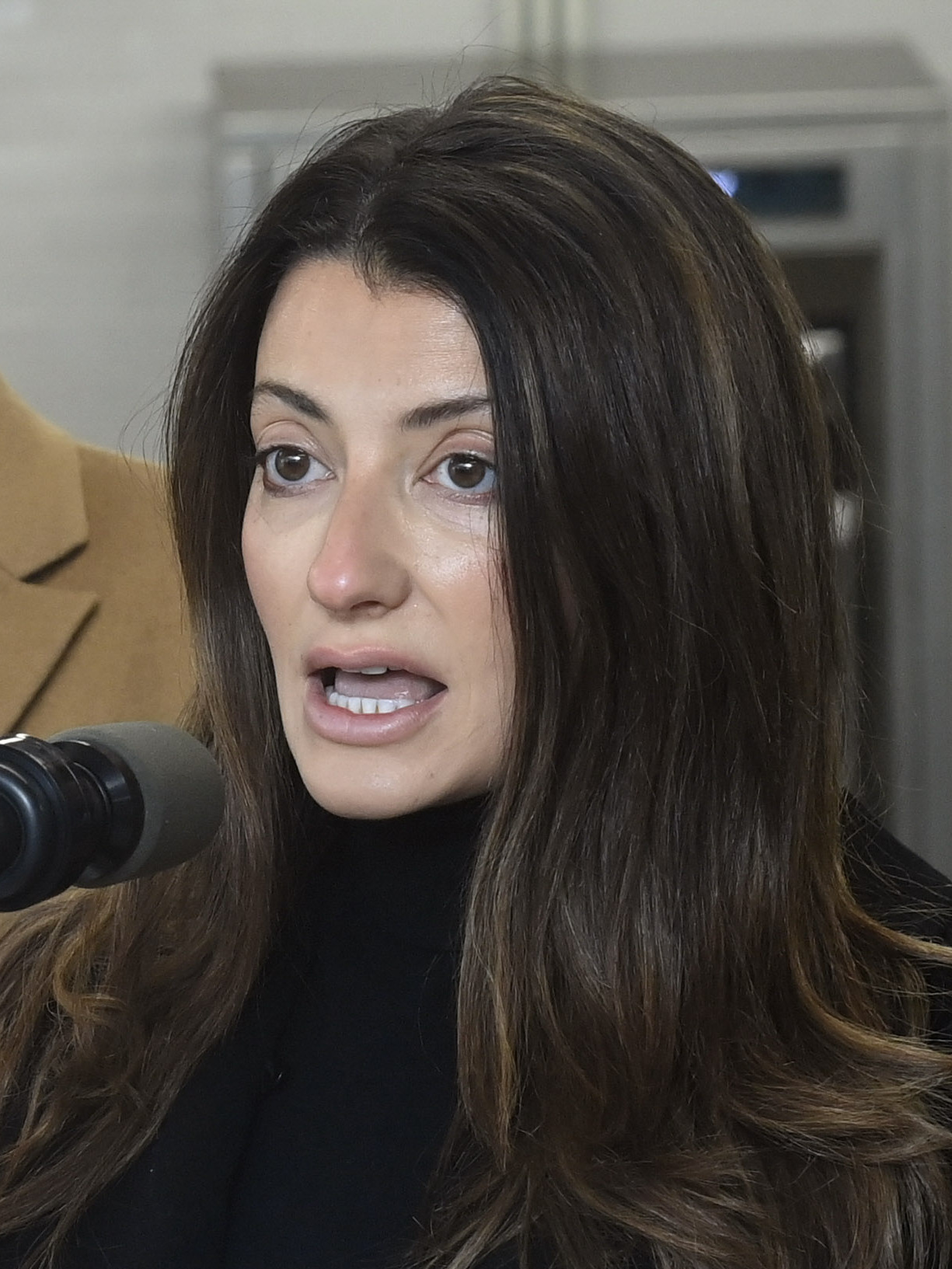
- Vernikov speaking in 2026

Member of the New York City Council from the 48th district
- Incumbent
- Assumed office December 1, 2021
- Preceded by: Chaim Deutsch

Minority Whip of the New York City Council
- Incumbent
- Assumed office January 7, 2026
- Preceded by: Vickie Paladino
- In office January 5, 2022 – February 7, 2025
- Succeeded by: Vickie Paladino

Personal details
- Born: August 30, 1984 (age 42) Chernivtsi, Ukrainian SSR, Soviet Union
- Party: Democratic (before 2020); Republican (2021–present)
- Education: Baruch College (BA); Florida Coastal School of Law (JD)
- Website: Official website

Inna Vernikov (Note: Ukrainian: Інна Вернікова, romanized: Inna Vernikova) (born August 30, 1984) is a Ukrainian-born American politician and attorney who is a member of the New York City Council for the 48th District. Formerly a Democrat, Vernikov is a member of the Republican Party and is the minority whip of the City Council.

== Early life and education ==
Vernikov was born in Chernivtsi in Ukrainian SSR, Soviet Union (now southwestern Ukraine), to Jewish parents. She attended ORT Specialized School #41, a Ukrainian Jewish day school. At age 12, she immigrated with her family to the United States. She received a BA from Baruch College and a JD from Florida Coastal School of Law.

Prior to running for City Council, Vernikov was an immigration and divorce lawyer.

== Political career ==
Before being elected, Vernikov was an aide to state assemblymember Dov Hikind.

=== New York City Council ===
Previously a registered Democrat, Vernikov switched parties and became a Republican to run for office after seeing a rise in antisemitism and what she sees as socialism in New York City. She is a supporter of Donald Trump. While campaigning, she said "Jews coming from the former Soviet Union are very familiar with communism and socialism, and many of us feel strongly that what today's Democratic Party is promoting is exactly what we ran from—a place where speech was censored, where we were not allowed to practice religion, where we didn't have freedom or economic opportunity."

Vernikov received the support of the district's former councilman Democrat Chaim Deutsch (who had been expelled from the council after pleading guilty to tax fraud), and was endorsed by Donald Trump Jr. (who made a robocall on her behalf). She was elected to the City Council after defeating the Democratic nominee, Steve Saperstein. Upon taking office in December 2021, she became one of five Republicans in the 51-member council, and the first Republican to represent a portion of Brooklyn in the New York City Council since Marty Golden in 2002.

As a councilwoman, Vernikov organized a rally against COVID-19 vaccine mandates in New York City outside Gracie Mansion in Manhattan. She had also organized a march against antisemitism after two Jewish teenagers were allegedly assaulted for wearing a hoodie with the logo of the Israel Defense Forces. After the faculty at City University of New York Law School passed a resolution supporting Boycott, Divestment and Sanctions against Israel, Vernikov announced she would pull $50,000 in funding for the law school and redirect it towards Legal Services NYC.

She voted against expanding the New York City speed camera program, which issues speeding tickets when a driver exceeds the posted speed limit by 11 or more miles per hour in a school zone. In September 2022, it was reported that Vernikov had been caught on camera for repeatedly and recklessly speeding through school zones. She had received 23 camera-issued tickets since mid-2020. She had also received 31 other non-moving violations.

In August 2022, Vernikov withdrew her $5,000 donation to the Museum of Jewish Heritage for allegedly banning Florida governor Ron DeSantis from their events, though the museum denied banning anyone. In December 2022, Vernikov called for the national Republican Party leadership to condemn Trump for hosting Kanye West and White supremacist Nick Fuentes at his residence, where West allegedly repeated his antisemitic views.

In March 2023, The New York Daily News published a report revealing that Vernikov sent an email blast, using her official government email account, to constituents soliciting business for $300 martial arts classes offered by Legion Self Defense; her email also included a link for her constituents to sign up. Vernikov was the Chair of the executive board of Legion Self Defense, and her biography on the City Council website lists her as "Chair at Legion Self Defense". The New York City Charter prohibits the use of public resources for financial gain. Vernikov said that her role is not paid, but New York City ethics rules also prohibit officials from using city resources for non-city purposes. Professor Richard Briffault, a former Chairperson of the New York City Conflicts of Interest Board, said Vernikov likely violated the government's ethics law, stating: "That's a clear violation of conflict rules."

On October 13, 2023, Vernikov was arrested on charges of criminal possession of a firearm after bringing a gun to a pro-Palestinian rally on Brooklyn College's campus. Vernikov had accused the protestors of supporting Hamas following the start of the Gaza war, and said the rallies would make CUNY campuses unsafe for Jewish students. The charges were later dropped by the Brooklyn District Attorney over a lack of proof that the gun was operable, citing a lab report that the gun was unloaded and missing its recoil spring assembly.

In 2025, amid the New York City housing shortage, Vernikov pressured a developer who was applying for a rezoning on Coney Island Avenue for an apartment building to cut down on the number of affordable housing units by half and increase parking spots so that there would be more parking spots for the building than housing units. Initially intended to have 60 housing units and 24 parking spots, Vernikov pressured the developer to downsize to 27 housing units and 35 parking spots. Vernikov argued that the area in question, which is near transit options (including the Neck Road Q train station, the Avenue U station on the F train, and the B68 bus), needed parking spots more than housing.

== Electoral history ==
=== 2025 ===
2025 New York City Council Republican primary, District 48
Party	Candidate	Votes	%
Republican	Inna Vernikov (incumbent)	2,637	65.4
Republican	Ari Kagan	1,371	34.0
Write-in		23	0.6
Total votes		4,031	100.0

2025 New York City Council election, District 48
Party	Candidate	Votes	%
Republican	Inna Vernikov	26,161	84.3
Conservative	Inna Vernikov	4,137	13.3
Total	Inna Vernikov (incumbent)	30,298	97.6
Write-in		739	2.4
Total votes		31,037	100.0
Republican hold			

=== 2023 ===
2023 New York City Council Republican primary, District 48
Party	Candidate	Votes	%
Republican	Inna Vernikov (incumbent)	1,730	70.6
Republican	Igor Kazatsker	707	28.8
Write-in		15	0.6
Total votes		2,452	100.0

2023 New York City Council election, District 48
Party	Candidate	Votes	%
Republican	Inna Vernikov	7,416	60.1
Conservative	Inna Vernikov	820	6.6
Total	Inna Vernikov (incumbent)	8,236	66.7
Democratic	Amber Adler	2,906	23.5
We The People	Amber Adler	123	1.0
Total	Amber Adler	3,029	24.5
Team Trump	Igor Kazatsker	1,002	8.1
Write-in		67	0.5
Total votes		12,344	100.0
Republican hold			

=== 2021 ===
2021 New York City Council election, District 48
Party	Candidate	Votes	%
Republican	Inna Vernikov	12,190	57.9
Conservative	Inna Vernikov (Note: Shared with "Centrist" ballot line.)	773	3.7
Total	Inna Vernikov	12,963	61.6
Democratic	Steven Saperstein	8,038	38.2
Write-in		51	0.2
Total votes		21,052	100.0
Republican gain from Democratic			
