= Douglas Prescott =

American politician

Member of the New York State Assembly from the 26th district
- In office January 6, 1993 – December 31, 1996
- Preceded by: Morton C. Hillman
- Succeeded by: Ann-Margaret Carrozza

Member of the New York State Assembly from the 25th district
- In office January 9, 1985 – December 31, 1992
- Preceded by: John F. Duane
- Succeeded by: Brian M. McLaughlin
- In office January 7, 1981 – December 31, 1982
- Preceded by: Vincent F. Nicolosi
- Succeeded by: John F. Duane

Personal details
- Party: Republican

Douglas W. Prescott is a former American politician.

== Career ==
At the time of his first campaign for the New York State Assembly, Prescott chaired the Queens chapter of the Young Republicans. He defeated incumbent Vincent F. Nicolosi in the 25th district. Prescott lost to John F. Duane in 1982, and regained his seat in a 1984 rematch. With the endorsement of the New York State Right to Life Party and endorsement from The New York Times in 1986, Prescott retained his office against Democratic candidate Douglas S. MacKay. He won reelection in 1988 against Corey B. Bearak. In the 1990 general election, Prescott defeated James J. Wrynn. Prescott faced another incumbent, Morton C. Hillman of the 26th district in 1992, and won. He won another term as assemblyman from the 26th district against William A. Viscovich in 1994, then successively lost two subsequent elections, to Ann-Margaret Carrozza in 1996 and 1998.
