= John Duane =

John Duane may refer to:

- John F. Duane, American politician from New York
- William John Duane (1780–1865), American politician from Pennsylvania
- John Duane Park (1819–1896), American judge from Connecticut
