= Morton Povman =

American politician (1931–2024)

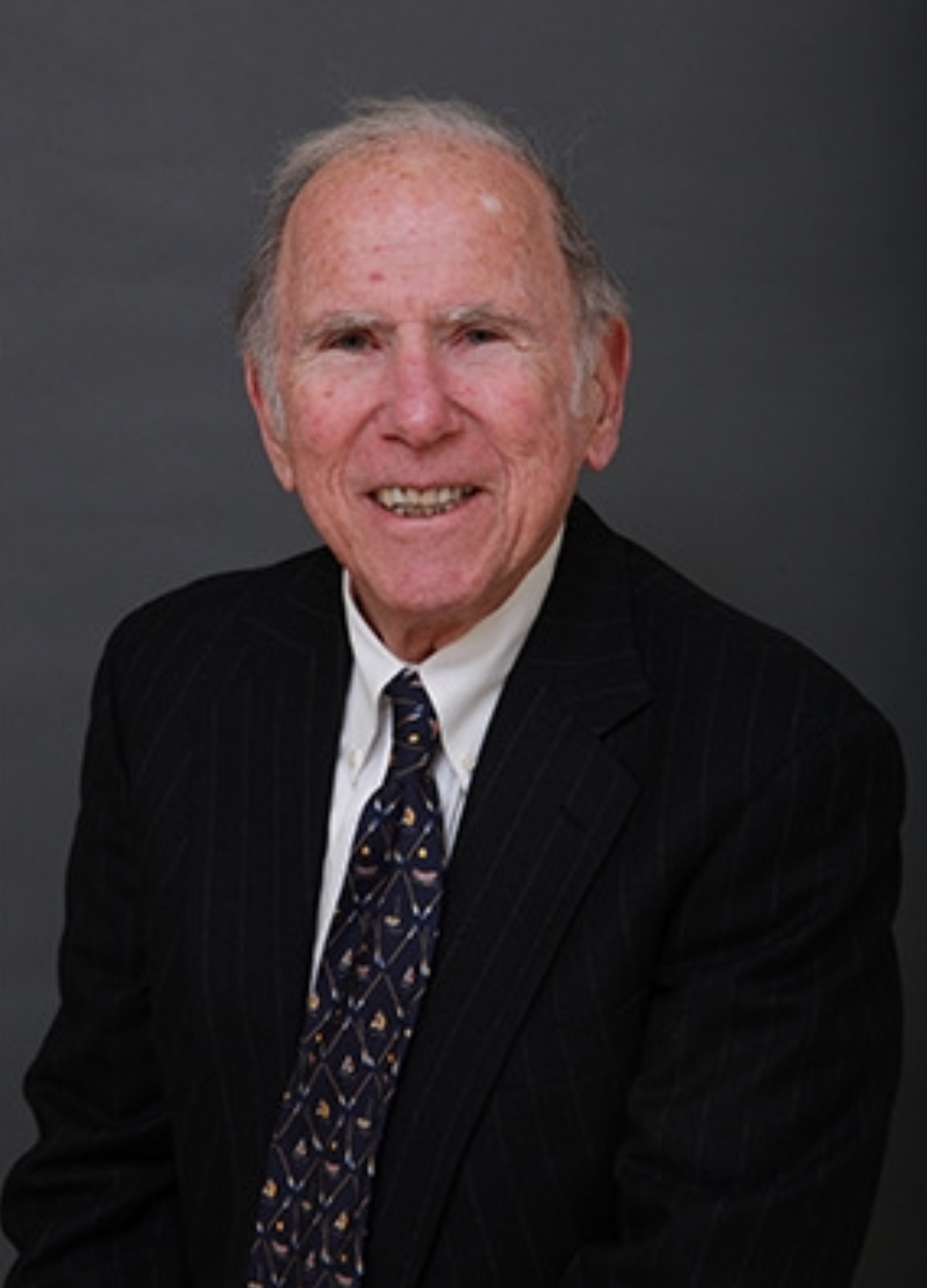
- Povman in 2013
- Born: January 13, 1931; Brooklyn, New York, U.S.
- Died: March 5, 2024 (aged 93); Kew Gardens Hills, New York, U.S.
- Known for: Longest serving member of the New York City Council
- Spouse: Sandra Arkow (m. 1958)
- Children: Two

Morton Povman (January 13, 1931 – March 5, 2024) was a Democratic member of the New York City Council, representing the 15th district and later the 24th district of Queens, which included Forest Hills, Rego Park, Kew Gardens, Briarwood, Kew Gardens Hills and Fresh Meadows. He served in this position from 1971 until his retirement due to term limits in 2001, making him the longest-serving councilman in the history of the City Council.

== Biography ==
Born in Brooklyn to Russian Jewish immigrants, he graduated first in his class from Brooklyn Law School in 1955 and was editor-in-chief of the Law Review. He then founded a law office in Forest Hills. Prior to public office, Povman served as legal counsel to State Assembly Majority Leader Moses M. Weinstein.

When Donald Manes was elected Queens Borough President, the Queens Democratic Party Organization chose Povman to fill the Council seat, as well the position of District Leader. He did not face a primary opponent in his time in the council.

Povman served as Chairman of the Rules Committee and the Health Committee. He was instrumental in keeping Metropolitan Hospital Center and the 107th Police Precinct operational when they were threatened with closure by the Mayor’s office. A defender of Flushing Meadows-Corona Park, Povman fought plans to build high-rise apartments near Willow Lake and a racetrack around Meadow Lake. He championed the relocation of the National Tennis Center into the park and played a crucial role in bringing the US Open (tennis) to its present-day location. All 15 parks in his district underwent major rehabilitation during his tenure.

As District Leader, Povman served as Executive Director of the John F. Kennedy Regular Democratic Club in Queens County. Throughout his career, Povman performed pro-bono legal work for numerous tenant and civic associations throughout Queens.

Povman married Sandra Arkow in 1958. He had two sons, both of whom went on to practice law in New York State, and five grandchildren. He died on March 5, 2024, due to pancreatic cancer.

Preceded by Donald Manes	New York City Council, 24th district 1971–2001	Succeeded by James F. Gennaro
