= Morton C. Hillman =

American politician

Member of the New York State Assembly from the 26th district
- In office January 1, 1987 – December 31, 1992
- Preceded by: David M. Kramer
- Succeeded by: Douglas W. Prescott

Personal details
- Died: February 3, 2014 (aged 87) Delray Beach, Florida
- Party: Democratic

Morton C. Hillman (died February 3, 2014) was an American politician who served in the New York State Assembly from the 26th district from 1987 to 1992.

He died on February 3, 2014, in Delray Beach, Florida, at age 87. He was Jewish.
