= New York's 25th State Assembly district =

American legislative district

Assemblymember
Nily Rozic; D–Fresh Meadows
- Registration: 55.5% Democratic; 13.4% Republican; 28.2% No party preference
- Demographics: 22% White; 4% Black; 14% Hispanic; 58% Asian; 0% Native American; 0% Hawaiian/Pacific Islander; 0% Other; 3% Multiracial
- Population (2020): 126,399
- Registered voters: 66,405

New York's 25th State Assembly district is one of 150 districts of the New York State Assembly. It is currently represented by Assembly member Nily Rozic. (D, WF).

== Geography ==
=== 2020s ===
District 25 is in Queens and spans the northeast portions of the borough, including the neighborhoods of East Flushing, Queensboro Hill, Hillcrest, Fresh Meadows, Oakland Gardens, Bayside, and Auburndale. Kissena Park and portions of Cunningham Park are within the district.

The district overlaps (partially) with New York's 5th and 6th congressional districts, the 11th, 14th and 16th districts of the New York State Senate, and the 19th, 20th, 23rd and 24th districts of the New York City Council.

=== 2010s ===
The 25th State Assembly district spans the northeast portions of Queens, including the neighborhoods of Flushing, Queensboro Hill, Hillcrest, Fresh Meadows, Oakland Gardens, Bayside, and Douglaston. Portions of Kissena Park, Cunningham Park and Alley Pond Park are within the district.

== Recent election results ==
=== 2026 ===
2026 New York State Assembly election, District 25
Party	Candidate	Votes	%
Democratic	Nily Rozic (incumbent)		
Write-in			
Total votes			100.0

=== 2024 ===
2024 New York State Assembly election, District 25
Primary election
Party	Candidate	Votes	%
Republican	Kenneth Paek	697	68.3
Republican	Kenneth Chiu	320	31.3
Write-in		4	0.4
Total votes		1,021	100
General election
Democratic	Nily Rozic	15,394	
Working Families	Nily Rozic	1,318	
Total	Nily Rozic (incumbent)	16,712	52.9
Republican	Kenneth Paek	13,601	
Conservative	Kenneth Paek	1,140	
Total	Kenneth Paek	14,741	46.7
Write-in		135	0.4
Total votes		31,588	100.0
Democratic hold			

=== 2022 ===
2022 New York State Assembly election, District 25
Party	Candidate	Votes	%
Democratic	Nily Rozic	10,777	
Working Families	Nily Rozic	975	
Total	Nily Rozic (incumbent)	11,752	57.0
Republican	Seth Breland	8,839	42.9
Write-in		34	0.1
Total votes		20,625	100.0
Democratic hold			

=== 2020 ===
2020 New York State Assembly election, District 25
Party	Candidate	Votes	%
Democratic	Nily Rozic	24,197	
Working Families	Nily Rozic	3,958	
Total	Nily Rozic (incumbent)	28,155	98.9
Write-in		300	1.1
Total votes		28,445	100.0
Democratic hold			

=== 2018 ===
2018 New York State Assembly election, District 25
Party	Candidate	Votes	%
Democratic	Nily Rozic	16,368	
Working Families	Nily Rozic	1,396	
Women's Equality	Nily Rozic	547	
Total	Nily Rozic (incumbent)	18,311	99.2
Write-in		143	0.8
Total votes		18,454	100.0
Democratic hold			

=== 2016 ===
2016 New York State Assembly election, District 25
Party	Candidate	Votes	%
Democratic	Nily Rozic	20,695	
Working Families	Nily Rozic	1,448	
Total	Nily Rozic (incumbent)	22,143	76.2
Republican	Usman Ali Chohan	6,856	23.6
Write-in		42	0.2
Total votes		29,041	100.0
Democratic hold			

=== 2014 ===
2014 New York State Assembly election, District 25
Party	Candidate	Votes	%
Democratic	Nily Rozic	7,875	
Working Families	Nily Rozic	679	
Independence	Nily Rozic	557	
Total	Nily Rozic (incumbent)	9,111	99.2
Write-in		71	0.8
Total votes		9,182	100.0
Democratic hold			

=== 2012 ===
2012 New York State Assembly election, District 25
Primary election
Party	Candidate	Votes	%
Democratic	Nily Rozic	2,322	55.2
Democratic	Jerry Iannece	1,854	44.1
Write-in		32	0.7
Total votes		4,208	100.0
General election
Democratic	Nily Rozic	15,889	
Working Families	Nily Rozic	590	
Total	Nily Rozic	16,479	66.7
Republican	Abraham Fuchs	6,098	24.7
Independence	Jerry Iannece	1,431	5.8
Conservative	William Garifal Jr.	655	2.7
Write-in		46	0.1
Total votes		24,709	100.0
Democratic hold			

=== 2010 ===
2010 New York State Assembly election, District 25
Party	Candidate	Votes	%
Democratic	Rory Lancman	10,729	
Working Families	Rory Lancman	959	
Total	Rory Lancman (incumbent)	11,688	99.7
Write-in		33	1.1
Total votes		11,721	100.0
Democratic hold			

=== 2008 ===
2008 New York State Assembly election, District 25
Party	Candidate	Votes	%
Democratic	Rory Lancman	16,598	
Working Families	Rory Lancman	675	
Total	Rory Lancman (incumbent)	17,273	100.0
Write-in		0	0.0
Total votes		17,273	100.0
Democratic hold			

=== 2006 ===
2006 New York State Assembly election, District 25
Primary election
Party	Candidate	Votes	%
Democratic	Rory Lancman	2,458	76.1
Democratic	Morshed Alam	771	23.9
Write-in		0	0.0
Total votes		3,229	100.0
General election
Democratic	Rory Lancman	9,849	
Working Families	Rory Lancman	546	
Total	Rory Lancman	10,395	79.6
Republican	Morshed Alam	2,656	20.3
Write-in		4	0.0
Total votes		13,055	100.0
Democratic hold			

=== 2004 ===
2004 New York State Assembly election, District 25
Party	Candidate	Votes	%
Democratic	Brian McLaughlin	18,926	
Working Families	Brian McLaughlin	960	
Total	Brian McLaughlin (incumbent)	19,886	100.0
Write-in		0	0.0
Total votes		19,886	100.0
Democratic hold			

=== 2002 ===
2002 New York State Assembly election, District 25
Party	Candidate	Votes	%
Democratic	Brian McLaughlin	9,414	
Working Families	Brian McLaughlin	433	
Liberal	Brian McLaughlin	330	
Total	Brian McLaughlin (incumbent)	10,177	100.0
Write-in		0	0.0
Total votes		10,177	100.0
Democratic hold			

=== 2000 ===
2000 New York State Assembly election, District 25
Party	Candidate	Votes	%
Democratic	Brian McLaughlin	14,781	
Working Families	Brian McLaughlin	502	
Liberal	Brian McLaughlin	428	
Total	Brian McLaughlin	15,711	100.0
Write-in		1	0.0
Total votes		15,712	100.0
Democratic hold			

=== Federal results in Assembly District 25 ===
Year	Office	Results
2024	President	Harris 49.7 - 48.3%
2024	Senate	Gillibrand 55.0 - 44.0%
2022	Senate	Schumer 55.6 - 43.7%
2020	President	Biden 61.6 - 37.3%
2018	Senate	Gillibrand 70.2 - 29.8%
2016	President	Clinton 64.3 – 32.4%
2016	Senate	Schumer 74.0 – 23.6%
2012	President	Obama 67.9 - 31.0%
2012	Senate	Gillibrand 75.9 - 22.8%

== Past Assemblymembers ==
- Rory I. Lancman (2006–2012)
- Brian McLaughlin (1992 - 2006)
