= Ann-Margaret Carrozza =

American lawyer, politician, and author

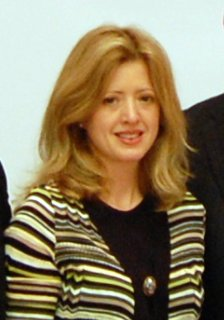
- Carrozza in 2011

Member of the New York State Assembly from the 26th district
- In office January 1, 1997 – December 31, 2010
- Preceded by: Douglas Prescott
- Succeeded by: Edward C. Braunstein

Personal details
- Born: December 17, 1966 (age 59) Queens, New York, U.S.
- Party: Democratic
- Spouse: William Duke
- Children: 2
- Education: Hofstra Law School (J.D.)
- Profession: Lawyer, politician, television legal analyst
- Website: myelderlawattorney.com

Ann-Margaret E. Carrozza (born December 17, 1966) is an American lawyer and politician from New York, who was a member of the New York State Assembly from 1997 to 2010.

She has appeared in numerous episodes of the Dr. Phil Show as well as on CNN, Fox News, Good Morning America, Today, Entertainment Tonight, Extra, Tamron Hall, and Fox Business. In 2024 Carrozza began hosting a New York area radio show called "The Laws of Your Money" on WCBS 880. The show continued to air with above average ratings for the time slot until the station's decision to abandon its "all news format" took effect on August 26, 2024. In November of that year Carrozza began hosting a show of the same name on WOR 710 which airs Sundays at 10:30am ET and can be streamed on IHeartRadio.

== Biography ==
Carrozza completed undergraduate studies at SUNY Albany and Empire State College. She received her Juris Doctor degree from the Hofstra University School of Law. Prior to her election to the State Assembly, Carrozza served as a court attorney for Civil Court Judge Peter O'Donoghue and as a clinical intern in the Queens County District Attorney's Office.

She was a member of the New York State Assembly (26th D.) from 1997 to 2010, sitting in the 192nd, 193rd, 194th, 195th, 196th, 197th and 198th New York State Legislatures. Her district comprised East Flushing, Douglaston, Whitestone, Little Neck, Floral Park, Bay Terrace, and Bayside among other neighborhoods located in Northeast Queens. Carrozza was Chair of the Standing Committee on State and Federal Relations, as well as a member of several other standing committees, including Aging, Banks, Governmental Employees and Insurance.

On March 26, 2010, Carrozza announced that she would not be seeking re-election. She currently heads an elder law practice, with offices in Bayside, Queens, Port Jefferson, Glen Head, and Manhattan, and lives in Glen Head with her husband William Duke and her two sons.

New York State Assembly
Preceded by Douglas Prescott	New York State Assembly, 26th District; 1997–2010	Succeeded by Edward Braunstein
