= James F. Gennaro =

American politician (born 1957)

Jim Gennaro
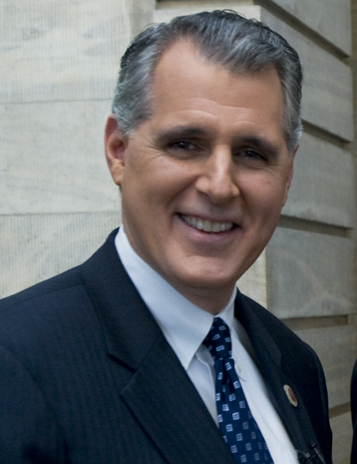

Member of the New York City Council from the 24th district
- Incumbent
- Assumed office February 18, 2021
- Preceded by: Rory Lancman
- In office January 1, 2002 – December 31, 2013
- Preceded by: Morton Povman
- Succeeded by: Rory Lancman

Personal details
- Born: May 3, 1957 (age 69)
- Party: Democratic
- Spouse: Wendy Phaff
- Education: State University of New York, Stony Brook (BA, MPA)
- Website: Official website

James F. Gennaro (born May 3, 1957) is an American politician serving as a Democratic member of the New York City Council, representing the 24th district since 2021. He previously represented the same seat from 2002 until 2013, and was the chair of the Council's Environmental Protection Committee. He was first elected to the Council in 2001. In November 2005, he was re-elected to the seat, based in central Queens.

In the 2008 New York state elections, Gennaro was the Democratic candidate for the New York State Senate; his opponent was the Republican incumbent, Frank Padavan. After 3 months of recounting ballots, the incumbent, Senator Padavan, was declared the winner and Gennaro conceded defeat.

In November 2009, Gennaro was re-elected for a third term on the City Council. Due to term limits, Gennaro did not run again in 2013; his seat was won by Democrat Rory Lancman. Gennaro left office on December 31, 2013.

Formerly the senior policy adviser to then Council Speaker Peter Vallone, Sr., Gennaro was an adjunct professor of political science and environmental public policy at Queens College. He also served as President of the Jamaica Estates Association and as a member of Queens Community Board 8.

Gennaro lost his first wife Joanne to multiple system atrophy in 2016. He married his second wife, Wendy B. Phaff in 2020, and they live in Jamaica Estates, Queens.

In 2020, he declared his intention to run for his former Council seat. On February 2, 2021, Gennaro declared his victory in the nonpartisan special election for this seat, after the city's Board of Election released its in-person voting results for that day. The election was the first in New York City to use ranked choice voting. Gennaro was sworn into office on February 18, 2021, 16 days after the special election date.

Gennaro introduced an amendment to code of the city of New York, that became law that restricted the compensation awarded by the environmental control board for citizen noise complaints. Protection would be capped at $5, and compensation for proceedings brought by a complainant would be capped at $10, thus discouraging noise complaints.

== Electoral history ==
=== 2025 ===
2025 New York City Council election, District 24
Party	Candidate	Votes	%
Democratic	James F. Gennaro (incumbent)	30,221	98.4
Write-in		498	1.6
Total votes		30,719	100.0
Democratic hold			

=== 2023 ===
2023 New York City Council election, District 24
Party	Candidate	Votes	%
Democratic	James F. Gennaro (incumbent)	7,383	74.3
Republican	Jonathan D. Rinaldi (Note: Shared with "Medical Freedom" ballot line.)	2,045	20.6
Conservative	Jonathan D. Rinaldi (Note: Shared with "Parent Party" ballot line.)	277	2.8
Total	Jonathan D. Rinaldi	2,322	23.4
Write-in		226	2.3
Total votes		9,931	100.0
Democratic hold			

=== 2021 ===
2021 New York City's 24th City Council district special election
Party	Candidate	Votes	%
Queens Strong	James F. Gennaro	4,078	60.1
Mo for the People	Moumita Ahmed	1,041	15.3
Soma for Queens	Soma S. Syed	537	7.9
A Better Queens	Deepti Sharma	322	4.7
Your Voice Matters	Dilip Nath	283	4.2
Community First	Neeta Jain	227	3.3
Unity	Mujib U. Rahman	192	2.8
United Citizens	Michael Earl Brown	96	1.4
Write-in		7	0.1
Total votes		6,783	100.0
Democratic hold			

2021 New York City Council Democratic primary, District 24
Party	Candidate	Votes	%
Democratic	James F. Gennaro (incumbent)	8,062	60.1
Democratic	Moumita Ahmed	3,020	22.5
Democratic	Saifur R. Khan	1,147	8.6
Democratic	Mohammed Uddin	1,123	8.4
Write-in		56	0.4
Total votes		13,408	100.0

2021 New York City Council election, District 24
Party	Candidate	Votes	%
Democratic	James F. Gennaro (incumbent)	12,740	72.8
Republican	Timothy Rosen	3,870	22.1
Conservative	Mujib U. Rahman	821	4.7
Write-in		70	0.4
Total votes		17,501	100.0
Democratic hold			

=== 2009 ===
2009 New York City Council election, District 24
Party	Candidate	Votes	%
Democratic	James F. Gennaro	13,855	94.3
Working Families	James F. Gennaro	832	5.7
Total	James F. Gennaro (incumbent)	14,687	100.0
Write-in		4	0.0
Total votes		14,691	100.0
Democratic hold			

=== 2008 ===
2008 New York State Senate election, District 11
Party	Candidate	Votes	%
Republican	Frank Padavan	39,101	43.4
Independence	Frank Padavan	3,320	3.7
Conservative	Frank Padavan	2,873	3.2
Total	Frank Padavan (incumbent)	45,294	50.3
Democratic	James F. Gennaro	43,330	48.1
Working Families	James F. Gennaro	1,481	1.6
Total	James F. Gennaro	44,811	49.7
Write-in		8	0.0
Total votes		90,113	100.0
Republican hold			

=== 2005 ===
2005 New York City Council election, District 24
Party	Candidate	Votes	%
Democratic	James F. Gennaro	15,513	74.9
Working Families	James F. Gennaro	798	3.9
Total	James F. Gennaro (incumbent)	16,311	78.7
Republican	Stephen Lynch	2,836	13.7
Independence	Renee Lobo	1,570	7.6
Total votes		20,717	100.0
Democratic hold			

=== 2003 ===
2003 New York City Council Democratic primary, District 24
Party	Candidate	Votes	%
Democratic	James F. Gennaro (incumbent)	5,184	69.6
Democratic	David Reich	1,380	18.5
Democratic	Florence Fisher	879	11.8
Write-in		1	0.0
Total votes		7,444	100.0

2003 New York City Council election, District 24
Party	Candidate	Votes	%
Democratic	James F. Gennaro	8,517	86.3
Working Families	James F. Gennaro	824	8.4
Total	James F. Gennaro (incumbent)	9,341	94.7
Conservative	Walter A. Lamp	522	5.3
Write-in		2	0.0
Total votes		9,865	100.0
Democratic hold			

=== 2001 ===
2001 New York City Council Democratic primary, District 24
Party	Candidate	Votes	%
Democratic	James F. Gennaro	5,080	40.7
Democratic	Barry S. Grodenchik	4,487	35.9
Democratic	David Reich	2,905	23.3
Write-in		10	0.1
Total votes		12,482	100.0

2001 New York City Council election, District 24
Party	Candidate	Votes	%
Democratic	James F. Gennaro	15,675	88.0
Working Families	Barry S. Grodenchik	1,785	10.0
Green	Lori M. Zett	348	2.0
Write-in		4	0.0
Total votes		17,812	100.0
Democratic hold			

== Notes ==
Political offices
Preceded by Morton Povman	Member of the New York City Council from the 24th district 2001–2013	Succeeded by Rory Lancman
Preceded by Rory Lancman	Member of the New York City Council from the 24th district 2021–present	Incumbent
