= Vincent F. Nicolosi =

American politician

Member of the New York State Assembly from the 25th district
- In office January 1, 1973 – December 31, 1980
- Preceded by: Alan Hevesi
- Succeeded by: Douglas W. Prescott

Personal details
- Born: July 30, 1939 Queens, New York City, New York
- Died: July 11, 2014 (aged 74) Manhasset, New York
- Party: Democratic

Vincent F. Nicolosi (July 30, 1939 – July 11, 2014) was an American politician who served in the New York State Assembly from the 25th district from 1973 to 1980.

He died of breast cancer on July 11, 2014, in Manhasset, New York at age 74.
