= New York's 26th State Assembly district =

American legislative district

Assemblymember
Edward Braunstein; D–Bayside
- Registration: 53.5% Democratic; 17.9% Republican; 25.1% No party preference
- Demographics: 48% White; 1% Black; 14% Hispanic; 35% Asian; 0% Native American; 0% Hawaiian/Pacific Islander; 0% Other; 2% Multiracial
- Population (2020): 123,176
- Registered voters: 73,414

New York's 26th State Assembly district is one of the 150 districts in the New York State Assembly in the United States. It has been represented by Democrat Edward Braunstein since 2011.

== Geography ==
=== 2020s ===
District 26 is located in Queens, comprising the neighborhoods of Douglaston, Little Neck, and Douglas Manor and portions of Beechhurst, Glen Oaks, Bayside and Auburndale. Most of Alley Pond Park and Fort Totten lie within the district.

The district overlaps (partially) with New York's 3rd and 6th congressional districts, the 11th and 16th districts of the New York State Senate, and the 19th and 23rd districts of the New York City Council.

=== 2010s ===
District 26 is located in Queens, comprising the neighborhoods of Bayside, Douglaston, Little Neck, Beechhurst, and parts of Whitestone, Glen Oaks, and Auburndale.

== Recent election results ==
=== 2026 ===
2026 New York State Assembly election, District 26
Primary election
Party	Candidate	Votes	%
Republican	Robert Speranza	809	61.8
Republican	Philip Grillo	491	37.5
Write-in		9	0.7
Total votes		1,309	100.0
General election
Democratic	Edward Braunstein (incumbent)		
Republican	Robert Speranza		
Write-in			
Total votes			100.0

=== 2024 ===
2024 New York State Assembly election, District 26
Party	Candidate	Votes	%
Democratic	Edward Braunstein (incumbent)	27,022	67.7
Conservative	Robert Speranza	11,944	
Common Sense	Robert Speranza	794	
Total	Robert Speranza	12,738	31.9
Write-in		142	0.4
Total votes		39,902	100.0
Democratic hold			

=== 2022 ===
2022 New York State Assembly election, District 26
Party	Candidate	Votes	%
Democratic	Edward Braunstein (incumbent)	18,590	54.4
Republican	Robert Speranza	14,274	
Conservative	Robert Speranza	1,277	
Total	Robert Speranza	15,551	45.5
Write-in		26	0.1
Total votes		34,167	100.0
Democratic hold			

=== 2020 ===
2020 New York State Assembly election, District 26
Party	Candidate	Votes	%
Democratic	Edward Braunstein (incumbent)	28,683	54.8
Republican	John-Alexander Sakelos	20,846	
Conservative	John-Alexander Sakelos	1,911	
Save Our City	John-Alexander Sakelos	846	
Total	John-Alexander Sakelos	23,603	45.1
Write-in		41	0.1
Total votes		52,327	100.0
Democratic hold			

=== 2018 ===
2018 New York State Assembly election, District 26
Party	Candidate	Votes	%
Democratic	Edward Braunstein	20,325	
Independence	Edward Braunstein	727	
Working Families	Edward Braunstein	656	
Women's Equality	Edward Braunstein	152	
Total	Edward Braunstein (incumbent)	21,860	65.2
Republican	David Bressler	10,495	
Conservative	David Bressler	1,055	
Reform	David Bressler	81	
Total	David Bressler	11,631	34.7
Write-in		18	0.1
Total votes		33,509	100.0
Democratic hold			

=== 2016 ===
2016 New York State Assembly election, District 26
Party	Candidate	Votes	%
Democratic	Edward Braunstein	28,733	
Independence	Edward Braunstein	1,866	
Working Families	Edward Braunstein	1,507	
Women's Equality	Edward Braunstein	1,149	
Total	Edward Braunstein (incumbent)	33,255	99.4
Write-in		209	0.6
Total votes		33,464	100.0
Democratic hold			

=== 2014 ===
2014 New York State Assembly election, District 26
Party	Candidate	Votes	%
Democratic	Edward Braunstein	12,252	
Independence	Edward Braunstein	1,500	
Working Families	Edward Braunstein	1,100	
Total	Edward Braunstein (incumbent)	14,852	99.4
Write-in		90	0.6
Total votes		14,942	100.0
Democratic hold			

=== 2012 ===
2012 New York State Assembly election, District 26
Party	Candidate	Votes	%
Democratic	Edward Braunstein	25,094	
Independence	Edward Braunstein	1,445	
Working Families	Edward Braunstein	1,380	
Total	Edward Braunstein (incumbent)	27,919	99.8
Write-in		63	0.2
Total votes		27,982	100.0
Democratic hold			

=== 2010 ===
2010 New York State Assembly election, District 26
Primary election
Party	Candidate	Votes	%
Democratic	Edward Braunstein	2,407	37.5
Democratic	John F. Duane	1,768	27.5
Democratic	Steven Behar	1,121	17.5
Democratic	Elio Forcina	1,115	17.4
Write-in		9	0.1
Total votes		6,420	100.0
General election
Democratic	Edward Braunstein	14,473	
Independence	Edward Braunstein	791	
Total	Edward Braunstein	15,264	58.0
Republican	Vincent Tabone	9,609	
Conservative	Vincent Tabone	1,434	
Total	Vincent Tabone	11,043	41.9
Write-in		19	0.1
Total votes		26,326	100.0
Democratic hold			

=== 2008 ===
2008 New York State Assembly election, District 26
Party	Candidate	Votes	%
Democratic	Ann-Margaret Carrozza	24,256	
Working Families	Ann-Margaret Carrozza	868	
Total	Ann-Margaret Carrozza (incumbent)	25,124	67.2
Republican	Robert Speranza	10,769	
Conservative	Robert Speranza	880	
Independence	Robert Speranza	609	
Total	Robert Speranza	12,258	32.8
Write-in		5	0.0
Total votes		37,387	100.0
Democratic hold			

=== 2006 ===
2006 New York State Assembly election, District 26
Party	Candidate	Votes	%
Democratic	Ann-Margaret Carrozza	17,332	
Working Families	Ann-Margaret Carrozza	1,171	
Total	Ann-Margaret Carrozza (incumbent)	18,503	100.0
Write-in		4	0.0
Total votes		18,507	100.0
Democratic hold			

=== 2004 ===
2004 New York State Assembly election, District 26
Party	Candidate	Votes	%
Democratic	Ann-Margaret Carrozza	24,633	
Independence	Ann-Margaret Carrozza	841	
Working Families	Ann-Margaret Carrozza	723	
Total	Ann-Margaret Carrozza (incumbent)	26,197	64.3
Republican	Peter Boudouvas	13,101	
Conservative	Peter Boudouvas	1,471	
Total	Peter Boudouvas	14,572	35.7
Write-in		1	0.0
Total votes		40,770	100.0
Democratic hold			

=== 2002 ===
2002 New York State Assembly election, District 26
Party	Candidate	Votes	%
Democratic	Ann-Margaret Carrozza	16,850	
Working Families	Ann-Margaret Carrozza	702	
Total	Ann-Margaret Carrozza (incumbent)	17,552	67.4
Republican	John Ottulich	7,146	
Conservative	John Ottulich	867	
Independence	John Ottulich	480	
Total	John Ottulich	8,493	32.6
Write-in		0	0.0
Total votes		26,045	100.0
Democratic hold			

=== 2000 ===
2000 New York State Assembly election, District 26
Party	Candidate	Votes	%
Democratic	Ann-Margaret Carrozza (incumbent)	25,486	100.0
Write-in		4	0.0
Total votes		25,490	100.0
Democratic hold			

=== Federal results in Assembly District 26 ===
Year	Office	Results
2024	President	Harris 51.8 - 46.6%
2024	Senate	Gillibrand 55.4 - 43.9%
2022	Senate	Schumer 55.1 - 44.3%
2020	President	Biden 56.7 - 42.2%
2018	Senate	Gillibrand 64.7 – 35.3%
2016	President	Clinton 56.7 – 40.0%
2016	Senate	Schumer 71.4 – 26.9%
2012	President	Obama 60.4 – 38.3%
2012	Senate	Gillibrand 71.3 – 27.3%
