= Rory Lancman =

American politician

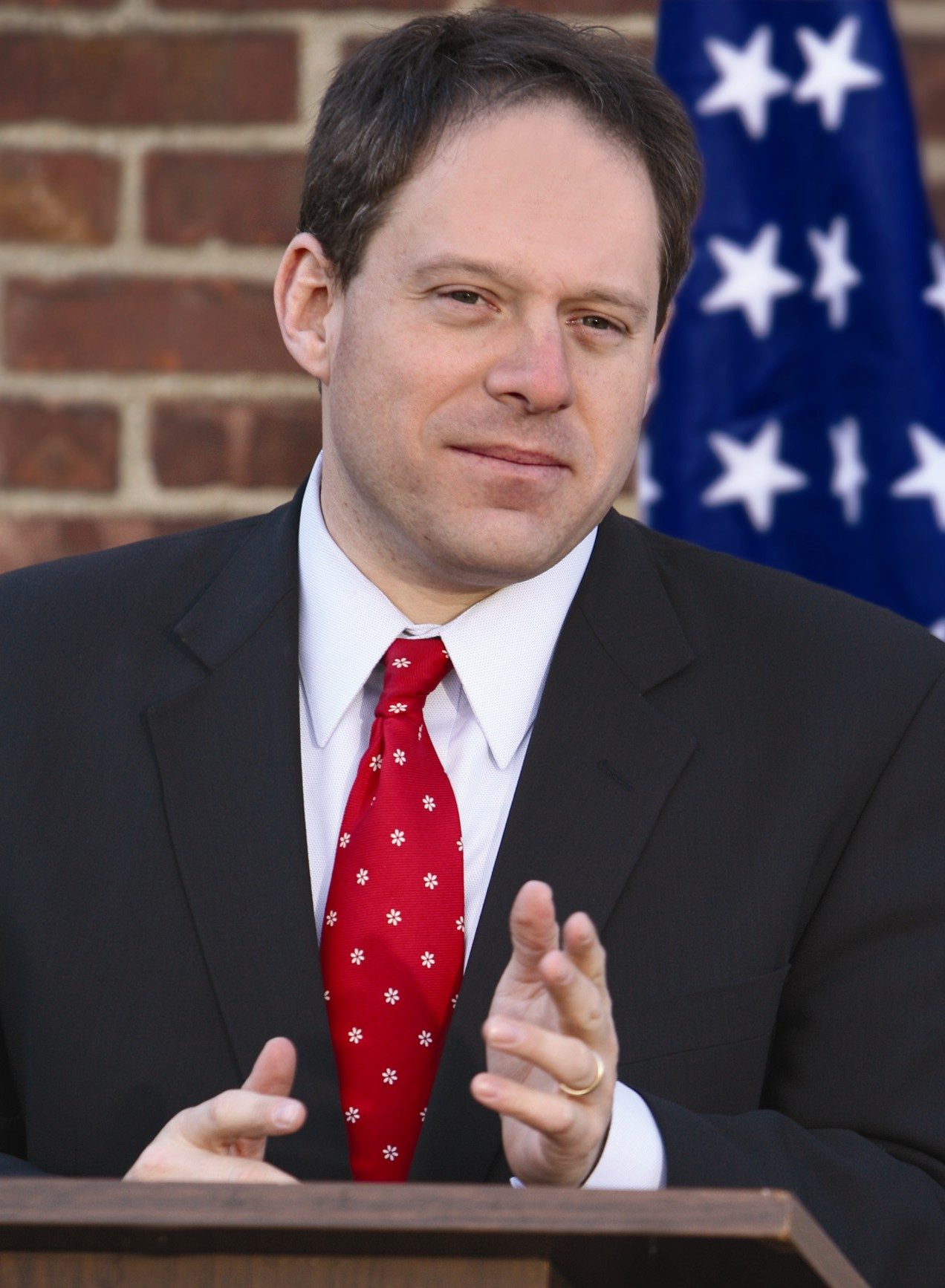
- Lancman in 2009

Member of the New York City Council from the 24th district
- In office January 1, 2014 – November 2, 2020
- Preceded by: James F. Gennaro
- Succeeded by: James F. Gennaro

Member of the New York State Assembly from the 25th district
- In office January 1, 2007 – December 31, 2012
- Preceded by: Brian McLaughlin
- Succeeded by: Nily Rozic

Personal details
- Born: March 4, 1969 (age 57) Queens, New York, U.S.
- Party: Democratic
- Spouse: Morgan Lancman
- Children: 3
- Education: Queens College (BA); Columbia Law School (JD)
- Website: Official website

Rory I. Lancman (born March 1, 1969) is an American politician and former member of the New York City Council, representing the 24th district from 2014 until 2020. He is a Democrat.

The district includes Briarwood, Cunningham Park, Flushing, Flushing Meadows Corona Park, Fresh Meadows, Hollis, Holliswood, Jamaica, Jamaica Estates, Jamaica Hills, Kew Gardens, Kew Gardens Hills and Richmond Hill in Queens. Formerly, Lancman served as a New York State Assembly member, representing the 25th Assembly District in Queens from 2007 to 2013.

== Early life and education ==
Lancman was born and raised in Queens and is a graduate of New York City Public School 164, Parsons Junior High School, and Hillcrest High School. He received a Bachelor of Arts degree from Queens College (City University of New York) in 1991 and a Juris Doctor degree from Columbia Law School in 1995, to which he had transferred after a year at the Benjamin N. Cardozo School of Law.

== Earlier career ==
Lancman served in the New York's 42nd Infantry Division as a lieutenant of Infantry from 1988 to 1992.

Lancman served on Community Board 8 for over sixteen years, chairing first the Aging Committee and then the Youth & Education Committee. He ran unsuccessfully for the New York Senate in 2000, losing to Frank Padavan.

In September 2007, he was named one of City Hall's "40 under 40" for being a young influential member of New York City politics. He was first elected to the State Assembly in 2006, and ran uncontested in the 2008 and 2010 general elections.

In 2012, Lancman sought the Democratic nomination for New York's 6th congressional district. He faced New York City Council member Elizabeth Crowley and fellow Assembly member Grace Meng, and eventually lost to Meng. A large campaign war chest gave Lancman's campaign cause to believe they would emerge the victor, but Meng went on to take it with over 50% of the vote.

== New York City Council ==
On November 19, 2012, Lancman declared his run for the 24th district of the New York City Council district, seeking to succeed James F. Gennaro in the 2013 election. Lancman won a score of endorsements, including the Queens County Democratic Party, the Working Families Party, the United Federation of Teachers, AFL-CIO, the International Brotherhood of Electrical Workers, SEIU 32BJ, and 1199 SEIU. Lancman defeated two other candidates in the primary and went on to win the general election in November 2013.

Council Member Lancman became the chair of a newly created committee on the New York City Council called the Committee on Courts and Legal Services. Although both are liberal, Lancman has been critical of Mayor Bill de Blasio at times.

He resigned from the City Council on November 4, 2020 for a position under Governor Andrew Cuomo as his Special Counsel for Ratepayer Protection.

Election history
Location	Year	Election	Results
NY Senate District 11	2000	General	√ Frank Padavan (R) 61.54% Rory Lancman (D) 37.76% Paula Stadtmauer (Liberal) .71%
NY Assembly District 25	2006	Democratic primary	√ Rory Lancman 76.34% Morshed Alam 23.66%
NY Assembly District 25	2006	General	√ Rory Lancman (D) 79.65% Morshed Alam (R) 20.35%
NY Assembly District 25	2008	General	√ Rory Lancman (D) Unopposed
NY Assembly District 25	2010	General	√ Rory Lancman (D) 99.72%
New York 6	2012	Democratic primary	√ Grace Meng 52.98% Rory Lancman 25.33% Elizabeth Crowley 16.46% Robert Mittman 5.23%
NY Supreme Court 09	2013	General	√ Maria Rosa (D) 22.88% √ Gerald Loehr (D) 19.56% √ Sandra Sciortino (D) 18.03% John LaCava (R) 14.53% Noreen Calderin (R) 13.60% Carl Chu (R) 10.43% Rory Lancman (Working Families) .95%
NYC Council 24th District	2013	Democratic primary	√ Rory Lancman 61.74% Andrea Veras 21.24% Mujib U. Rahman 17.02%
NYC Council 24th District	2013	General	√ Rory Lancman (D) 73.68% Alexander Blishteyn (R) 20.02% Majib Rahman (I) 6.20%

In 2019, Lancman was a candidate in the Democratic primary for Queens County District Attorney in the State of New York. He dropped out and supported Melinda Katz, who won.

Nily Rozic is the Democratic incumbent who succeeded Lancman as the Assemblymember for the 25th District.

Political offices
Preceded by James F. Gennaro	New York City Council, 24th district 2014–present	Incumbent
Preceded by Brian McLaughlin	New York Assembly, 25th district 2007–2012	Succeeded by Nily Rozic
