= Brian M. McLaughlin =

American politician

Brian M. McLaughlin is a former American Democratic politician and labor leader from Flushing, Queens.

McLaughlin was a New York Assemblyman elected in 1992 to represent the 25th district in New York City. He was also elected, in June 1995, as the President of the New York City Central Labor Council (NYCCLC).

McLaughlin was arrested October 17, 2006, on charges of stealing more than $2 million from the State of New York and labor unions. After his arrest, he announced that he would not run for re-election, and left office at the end of 2006.

In March 2008, he pleaded guilty to charges of racketeering and embezzlement. On May 20, 2009, he was found guilty of these charges and sentenced to ten years' imprisonment.

== Early life and family ==
McLaughlin was born in Inwood, Manhattan, New York, and grew up in Queens. His family moved to Brentwood, Suffolk County, New York on Long Island, when he was 10. His paternal grandfather, Miles McLaughlin, an electrician, was an immigrant from County Cavan, Ireland. McLaughlin's father was also an electrician, who worked for years as chief electrician at The New York Times. His mother held jobs at General Motors and Gertz department stores. None of his family went to college. Both McLaughlin's father and his paternal grandfather were union activists; Miles McLaughlin sat on labor leader Harry Van Arsdale's "Committee of 100".

In his high school yearbook, McLaughlin's stated career ambition was practical: electrician. He later dropped out of Bridgeport University and did become an electrician.

== Career ==
=== Electrician work and higher education ===
McLaughlin started his career as a journeyman electrician. He belonged to Local 3 of the International Brotherhood of Electrical Workers and was one of the union's business representatives. At a union meeting, he met labor leader Harry Van Arsdale, Jr., head of the CLC, who would become his mentor. Van Arsdale also came out of Local 3 of the IBEW, which was "long the most politically active building trades union in New York".

Van Arsdale convinced McLaughlin that a job as a unionized electrician and a college degree were not incompatible, and persuaded him to attend night school.

While McLaughlin was working as an electrician, he attended the Empire State College of the State University of New York and eventually graduated with a B.S. He also attended the New York Institute of Technology, where he earned a master's degree in Industrial Labor Relations. He later said that at this time he also worked on honing his leadership qualities.

According to The New York Times, Van Arsdale "tutored Mr. McLaughlin on the ins and outs of labor politics and electoral politics." In 1981, Van Arsdale "gave the ambitious young electrician a huge responsibility – to organize the first Labor Day Parade in the city in decades."

Eventually McLaughlin left his electrician job and went to serve as President for the New York City Central Labor Council.

=== Politics ===
In 2003, McLaughlin was quoted about his happenstance of being a politician, saying he entered "politics quite by accident... I don't particularly like politics, and I have no ego for it, quite frankly... I guess all of us would say it's disproportionately influenced by money. But in the end, it's a process where you have a limited opportunity to champion and better the situation of the people who elected you. And if you don't have determination, it's an unfriendly process."

==== Democratic district leader ====
McLaughlin, according to the New York Times, "was drafted into running for Democratic district leader in 1986 with the Queens Democratic Party in disrepair after the suicide of Donald R. Manes; he won by 86 votes."

==== New York State Assembly ====
In 1992, McLaughlin was elected to the New York State Assembly from the 25th Assembly District, which covers a portion of eastern Queens. He served as Chairman of the Democratic Conference and also sat on the influential Ways and Means Committee. While in the Assembly, he was author of the Sharps Bill, designed to prevent workplace injuries in the health-care industry. He was remembered as "not a particularly high-profile legislator; most of his influence was exerted as a union chief."

A February 2002 report noted that St. Ann's Athletic Association in Flushing had received $4,000 from McLaughlin for uniforms, equipment, and facilities, an appropriation he had introduced into the 1999 state budget. He stated, "Studies have shown that when kids play sports they are less likely to use drugs and get in trouble, and they are more likely to stay in school."

==== Mayoral ambitions ====
In 1997 and 2003, there was speculation of a possible McLaughlin run for the New York mayor's office. By October 2003, he had raised over $1 million of campaign funds for a possible 2005 run.

=== Labor Council ===
During McLaughlin's tenure at the Council on New York City Labor, he served as the assistant to the son of the first president of the organization, Thomas Van Arsdale. In 1986, Van Arsdale's father, Harry Van Arsdale, Jr., died, and he assumed his father's position in the organization as president.

The Labor Council today reigns as the largest municipal labor council in the country, a federation with 400 union locals and over 1 million members.

In June 1995, McLaughlin succeeded Van Arsdale as the president of the CLC in a landslide election; Thomas Van Arsdale floundered in the position and McLaughlin was charged with re-energizing the council.

The Labor Council represents laborers from a wide range of industries and enterprises. The union locals that belong to the organization "represent workers ranging from public school teachers to crane operators to employees at the Bronx Zoo, The council's main responsibilities are coordinating the various unions' political activities and placing labor's overall weight behind individual unions during organizing drives and strikes."

McLaughlin is also recognized for a number of achievements during his tenure at the CLC. He "was among the most influential labor leaders in New York City and in the state, providing pivotal early support for Mayor Michael R. Bloomberg's re-election and supporting the failed effort to build a football stadium on the Far West Side of Manhattan. He led the fight to keep Wal-Mart out of the city and lent strong support to transit workers" during a 2005 strike.

McLaughlin had also been courted by not just the mayor, but also bishops, corporate CEOs and real estate magnates, thus emerging "as a major player in some of the biggest municipal battles" of 2006, "including the transit strike and the West Side stadium fight."

As head of the Labor Council, McLaughlin led the annual Labor Day Parade. In 2001, he praised the selection of United Federation of Teachers President Randi Weingarten as grand marshal of that year's parade. "Throughout the years, labor has focused on certain issues - the eight-hour workday, a livable minimum wage, the protection of Social Security. This year our attention will be on the need for quality public schools... Randi Weingarten has not only been an outstanding labor leader in this city. In a time where teacher bashing and finger-pointing, she has been a beacon in fighting for teachers and students."

On October 4, 2003, as New York chairman of the Immigrant Workers Freedom Ride, McLaughlin presided over a rally of 100,000 immigrants and their supporters at Flushing Meadows-Corona Park and spoke up for illegal-immigrant workers: "The labor movement is well placed to redefine itself around the needs of those who most need a labor union."

In 2004, McLaughlin protested Mayor Bloomberg's fiscal austerity, saying, "Now is the time to invest in our public employees who have not let us down... Years of privatization and productivity schemes from City Hall have gotten us nowhere."

In 2006, after McLaughlin's indictment, he was defended for his accomplishments; labor leaders "credited him with reinvigorating the Central Labor Council in a city where unions were once far more powerful." One of the many local labor leaders to praise McLaughlin during his indictment, was most notably Randi Weingarten, President of the United Federation of Teachers: "Brian took over the Central Labor Council when it was at its lowest point in terms of power, prestige and stature and made it into an important institution again... One of his big strengths is that even if you're in a fight that's unpopular, he'll stand with you."

== Moskowitz hearings on UFT contracts ==
In December 2003, it was understood that New York City Councilwoman Eva Moskowitz had "garnered the undisguised ire of Randi Weingarten, the powerful head of the UFT and Brian McLaughlin" by "publicly airing the work rules that many education reformers have criticized for years."

When Moskowitz held hearings in November 2003 "on how union contracts imposed inane work rules on public schools and made it nearly impossible for principals to fire bad teachers," she "went toe to toe" with Weingarten, who arranged to have McLaughlin, a longtime friend and ally, at her side during the confrontation. McLaughlin, who had opposed the hearings, said that he was there "to remind the city council members that the entire labor movement in the city is watching them." Influenced by McLaughlin's presence, then City Councilman Bill de Blasio, a strong labor supporter who would later become mayor, "did what he could to distance himself from Moskowitz during the hearing."

The New York Daily News stated in an issue of November 2003, "McLaughlin did not testify. But with 1.5 million members in his labor council - many of them active, Democratic voters - he didn't have to. McLaughlin's show of political muscle demonstrated how unnerved the unions are by the hearings."

In November, 2003, McLaughlin gave a speech at Queens College criticizing Moskowitz's hearings. He accused Gifford Miller, the City Council Speaker, of making "--referencing to Eve Moskowitz--at the expense of the careers of "over 100,000 workers"—referencing New York public school teachers—who "were ridiculed in the process." McLaughlin, stating that labor had "built our city," simply saying that it was time "to get tough and play offense."

A local newspaper, attempting to make sense of the speech, stated: "Clearly, here was the labor candidate denouncing the anti-labor candidate in no uncertain terms in what will be recalled as the day the race for the 2005 Democratic mayoral primary got off the mark."

== Other activism ==
McLaughlin was part of a coalition urging the Lower Manhattan Development Corporation to commit $1 billion in post-9/11 federal funding to the Liberty Jobs plan. He led the 2003 Labor for Democracy campaign in reaction to Mayor Michael R. Bloomberg's effort to increase voter participation by replacing the 2003 party primaries with a charter referendum proposal. "If not the labor movement," he said, "then who is going to stand up and speak out for the working people? Sure, I'm looking cynically at the mayor's proposal; this smells of politics. What's broken? What's he trying to fix? The medicine we're trying to give the patient is not what the doctor prescribed. It imperils democracy."

McLaughlin, in collaboration with Randi Weingarten, Rev. Al Sharpton and others, was part of a coalition that organized a march against police brutality. In 2003, he started, as the New York chairman of the Immigrant Workers Freedom Ride, a campaign which called for "a road to citizenship, the reunification of families, a voice and dignity in the workplace, and the civil rights of all people."

At the 2004 Republican National Convention, he worked with convention organizers to negotiate no-strike labor agreements, in order to secure the convention's venue in New York. However, during the convention, he organized a rally of unionists from a wide variety of trades to protest certain Bush Administration labor policies.

== Indictment, trial and imprisonment ==
=== Indictment ===
In March 2006, the FBI raided McLaughlin's offices, making public the fact that he was being investigated.

In October 2006, McLaughlin was indicted on 44 federal counts, including racketeering, money laundering, bank and mail fraud, labor bribery, and embezzlement. He was placed under arrest. "He was accused of stealing from virtually every organization with which he was involved," said the New York Post.

At the news conference announcing the 186-page indictment, Michael J. Garcia, the United States Attorney for Manhattan, described the extent of McLaughlin's alleged financial misdeeds as "stunning in its breadth and scope," and said, "This case lends a new meaning to the term 'hand in the till'... "What we have here is really a story of greed."

The New York Times reported that McLaughlin had legally made "$263,600 in combined salaries and expenses as an assemblyman and labor council president." The Times further described the charges as "ranging from the Dickensian (stealing $95,000 from Little League baseball teams to pay his rent) to the brazen (creating two no-show jobs on his legislative payroll and keeping part of one salary)."

Labor experts expressed shock when hearing of the charges brought to McLaughlin. Labor historian Joshua Freeman, of the City University of New York, said, "If these charges prove true, it's certainly a blot on the union movement."

According to the charges, McLaughlin had stolen "more than $2.2 million from the state, his union, his political club, his campaign and a Little League." The Little League team in question, from which McLaughlin had allegedly skimmed $95,000, was run by the Electchester Athletic Association. He had reportedly "solicited donations for the team, which he founded, then took the money after it was deposited in one of the organization's bank accounts." According to the indictment, McLaughlin became furious "when he learned a team official tried to use $2,800 to pay for legitimate softball expenses," saying: "All that f-----g money he's f-----g spending on other stuff, that ain't his money... That's mine."

The indictment also alleged that McLaughlin got the United Way charity to fund a Commission on the Dignity of Immigrants program. It was reported that McLaughlin "put a relative in charge who funneled his $94,000 salary back to him."

The indictment charged that McLaughlin "took more than $140,000 from the street lights division of Local 3 of the International Brotherhood of Electrical Workers, for which he served as business representative," plus "$185,000 from the Central Labor Council, more than $35,000 from the State Assembly, and more than $330,000 from his own re-election committee." Moreover, it charged that "he illegally received more than $1.4 million from street-lighting contractors and other companies and that the lighting contractors gave him three cars — one of which he gave to his son and another to a second woman with whom he had a close personal relationship."

The indictment also charged that McLaughlin had "used subordinates as 'personal servants,' to take his dog to the veterinarian, hang Christmas lights, trap rodents in his basement and clean out his barn." He was "also charged with making an aide use his E-ZPass at tollbooths to make it appear that he had returned home from Albany later than he really had, allowing him to bill for daily allowances given to legislators." Moreover, he was "accused of using more than $330,000 from his re-election campaign funds to pay for personal expenses like a rehearsal dinner for his son's wedding, renovation of his $760,000 house in Suffolk County near Long Island Sound, payment of his country club membership fees and the purchase and installation of a plasma television for a female friend." In addition, McLaughlin was "charged with using stolen money for an $80,000 Mercedes-Benz for his wife, marina fees, school tuition for one of his children, rent payments on his Albany residence and rent payments on his Queens residence."

McLaughlin was also charged with accepting $450,000 in payments from Argent Electric, owned by former New York City Mayor Abe Beame's son, Bernard "Buddy" Beame, as part of a secret partnership dating back to 1999, when the city decided to switch from regular traffic lights to light-emitting diodes (LEDs). Argent sought the contract to provide the LEDs; McLaughlin, who as head of the CLC represented electrical workers, "could have failed to provide the number of electrical workers needed, or send people who weren't skilled," thereby sabotaging the contract. Beame "paid him to prevent that." In return for efforts by McLaughlin and an associate at the CLC on Argent's behalf, including pressuring contractors to buy LED units from a firm represented by Argent and encouraging contractors and CLC members to buy Argent products, Beame gave McLaughlin and his associate half of Argent's profits.

The indictment also accused McLaughlin of using the Street Lighting Association fund "as his personal piggy bank, routinely diverting money earmarked for union members to himself, relatives and close friends."

==== Post-indictment ====
According to federal authorities, most of the money McLaughlin stole reportedly "went to turn McLaughlin's home in tony Nissequogue, Long Island, into a mansion, complete with wine cellar and gazebo." Some of his ill-gotten gains "funded... 'personal relationships' with a number of women." One of these women, Eleanore Levitas, was allegedly paid sizable sums in 2000 "for 'consulting services' to McLaughlin's re-election campaign committee," was put on the CLC payroll, and was given "a no-show job with a street-light contractor."

Levitas "angrily denied" the charges involving her, describing herself as a victim of McLaughlin, but her step-uncle, Demetrius Pabers, told a reporter that McLaughlin had picked her up in a strip club in Queens, where she was stripping at the time, had showered her with money, and had given her a no-show job. She insisted that it had been a real job. "What upsets me is I look like his partner in crime. I'm nothing close to that."

Another one of the women whom McLaughlin had allegedly showered with gifts and cash was reported to be Sonia Menezes, "an attractive beauty-spa operator with whom he carried on a long-term relationship."

McLaughlin, represented by Jonathan Bach, pleaded not guilty at his arraignment in Federal District Court in Manhattan before Magistrate Judge James C. Francis IV. It was noted that McLaughlin could face up to 500 years in prison if convicted of all charges.

After learning of the indictment, UFT president Randi Weingarten, a longtime friend and ally of McLaughlin, told the New York Times, "I've been walking around all day stunned." ... It's like when you hear someone you're close to has suddenly died. But nobody wants to jump to any conclusions." Weingarten suggested that perhaps the FBI had conducted the raid on McLaughlin's office as a means of pressuring him to provide evidence against others. She said she had just lunched with McLaughlin on the previous Wednesday and "was shocked to learn of the allegations... I don't think any of us know enough to judge anything today, other than that our hearts go out to Brian and his family."

Following the news of the indictment, the CLC's 32-member executive board voted unanimously to suspend salary payments to McLaughlin, who at the time was on a paid leave of absence. Weingarten, a member of the board, only said that the vote "speaks for itself."

Shortly after McLaughlin's arrest, he was reportedly described by his staffers as "the cheapest boss on two feet," who had "refused to pay Christmas bonuses and argued over paying a staffer's health insurance." In addition, he had compelled union workers to serve as his personal drivers. One McLaughlin staffer said, "McLaughlin never should have been allowed by a state ethics panel to simultaneously run a union and serve as state Assemblyman... In some twisted way, he thought it was OK."

In November 2006, McLaughlin was removed from his post as CLC president. He had already announced in January 2006 that he would not be running for re-election to the New York State Assembly.

In August 2007, it was reported that McLaughlin, who was out on bail pending trial, had been "last spotted a few months ago working as an electrician again for the first time in a quarter-century - this time making $46 an hour at an apartment house under construction on Manhattan's West Side." He was quoted as saying, "I'm back at work because I need to work."

=== Trial ===
In March 2008, McLaughlin entered a plea of guilty in exchange for a reduced potential sentence. Asked her opinion of this development, Weingarten said, "Brian McLaughlin was a colleague and a close friend... this is a sad day for him, his family, and the labor movement."

At his trial in Federal District Court in Manhattan, prosecutors "charged that Mr. McLaughlin had misappropriated more than $330,000 from his own re-election committee; $185,000 from the New York City Central Labor Council, which he led; and more than $35,000 from the State Assembly. They said he had created fictitious jobs within the labor council and on his own legislative staff, and took kickbacks from the jobholders."

After McLaughlin was found guilty in May 2009, federal prosecutor Daniel A. Braun asked for leniency, saying he had provided substantial assistance to the government. McLaughlin's lawyer, Michael F. Armstrong, said, "This is someone who at core is a good person who went terribly wrong, and who realizes that, and realizes it fully." McLaughlin apologized to the judge for his "improper conduct and criminal activity," saying that he made no excuses for it, but adding, "over the last three, three and a half years, I've had the opportunity to live the way I'd like to live my life." The New York Times described this as "an apparent reference to steps he has taken toward rehabilitation like attending Alcoholics Anonymous meetings, as well as cooperating with the government."

Judge Richard J. Sullivan, however, rejected requests for leniency, and sentenced McLaughlin to ten years in prison and a $25,000 fine. "You had every opportunity," said Sullivan, "and you used those opportunities and squandered them for your own benefit on a monumental scale." The prosecution's request for leniency was reportedly based on the fact that McLaughlin had aided in the investigation of other public officials who had committed crimes, such as fellow Assemblyman Anthony Seminerio, but Sullivan said McLaughlin's betrayal of public trust "outweighed any assistance he had given." Noting his receipt of dozens of letters supporting McLaughlin, including one from AFL-CIO president John Sweeney citing McLaughlin's "long record of service to the working men and women of New York City," Sullivan said that the portrait of McLaughlin painted by Sweeney and others did not jibe with the picture that emerged from courtroom evidence of "a man who so abused the trust of institutions and people who depended on him that it sort of staggers the mind." Sullivan added that McLaughlin's actions confirmed "the harshest critics of organized labor who accuse the leadership of corruption, and point to you as an example of that corruption." Sullivan ordered McLaughlin, who remained free on bond, to surrender on July 21.

==== Post-trial ====
In July 2009, electrical contractor Santo Petrocelli, Sr., of the Petrocelli Electric Company, pleaded guilty to making thousands of dollars in illegal payments to McLaughlin at the latter's request. Petrocelli said he had made the payments to avoid a worker slowdown. McLaughlin "controlled all the labor," Petrocelli said. "We certainly didn't want any problems with the local." The relationship between McLaughlin and Petrocelli, according to the U.S. Attorney's Office in Manhattan, had lasted from the mid-1990s through 2006, and had involved hundreds of thousands of dollars in cash payments, in return for which McLaughlin had used his position to benefit Petrocelli's business.

As of August 2011, it was reported that McLaughlin "promised to pay back everybody he stole from... Yet none of his victims - who are owed more than $845,000 - have been repaid." The sum included $90,085 owed to the Electchester Athletic Association's Little League team. He also owed $276,383 to the electrical workers' union, $268,821 to the NY Central Labor Council, $32,274 to the state Assembly, $19,475 to a Queens political club and $153,939 to Welsbach Electric of College Point. He had sold his Nissequogue, L.I. home for $652,000 and sold his $80,000 Mercedes, and in March 2010 had delivered a "$457,253 check to prosecutors with the expenditure marked 'preliminary order of forfeiture'"; yet as of August 2011 still had "more than $285,000 in the campaign war chest - sitting in a tax-free bond account earning interest."

== Alleged paramours ==
There were multiple implications and testimonies of McLaughlin's extra-marital engagements with multiple women. The most notable were New York City Councilwoman Elizabeth Crowley, Eleanore Levitas (an alleged stripper who took a "no-show" job for a paycheck),

== Awards ==
McLaughlin won the Labor Achievement Award, presented by New Democratic Dimensions.

== Personal life ==
At the time of his indictment, he had an apartment in Queens; a house in Nissequogue, New York, purchased in 2003 for $760,000; a home in Melbourne Beach, Florida, bought for $81,000 in 1999, and a residence in Albany, New York.

New York State Assembly
Preceded by Douglas Prescott	New York State Assembly; 25th District; 1993–2006	Succeeded by Rory Lancman
