= Edward Braunstein =

American politician

Member of the New York State Assembly from the 26th district
- Incumbent
- Assumed office January 1, 2011
- Preceded by: Ann-Margaret Carrozza

Personal details
- Born: Edward Charles Braunstein; April 21, 1981 (age 45) Manhasset, New York, U.S.
- Party: Democratic
- Education: State University of New York, Albany (BS); New York Law School (JD)
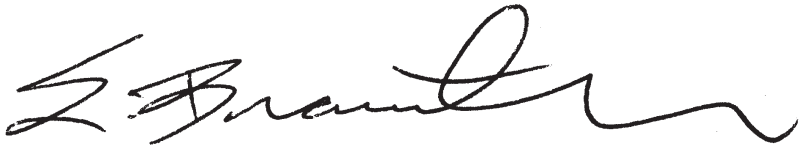
- Signature
- Website: State Assembly website

Edward Charles Braunstein (born April 21, 1981) is an American politician. He is a Democratic member of the New York State Assembly representing the 26th Assembly District in Queens, New York.

Braunstein received a Bachelor of Science degree in finance from the State University of New York at Albany. After college he worked as a legislative assistant in the New York City office of Assembly Speaker Sheldon Silver, while also attending evening classes at New York Law School. He graduated magna cum laude in February 2009 and subsequently passed the New York State bar exam that same month.

He has served on Queens Community Board 11 and was a member of its Parks Committee and Education Committee.

Braunstein won a September 2010 Democratic primary election to replace retiring Assembly member Ann-Margaret Carrozza. In the November 2010 general election he defeated the Conservative-Republican candidate by a vote of 15,264 to 11,043.
