= Nily Rozic =

American politician (b. 1986)

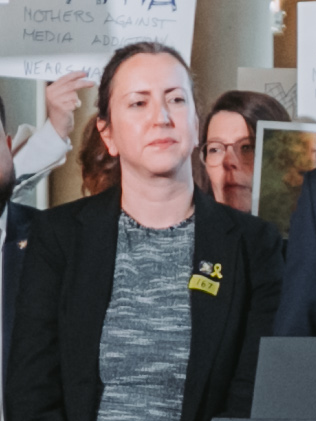

Member of the New York State Assembly from the 25th district
- Incumbent
- Assumed office January 1, 2013
- Preceded by: Rory Lancman

Personal details
- Born: March 15, 1986 (age 40) Jerusalem, Israel
- Party: Democratic
- Education: New York University (BS); Syracuse University (MPA)
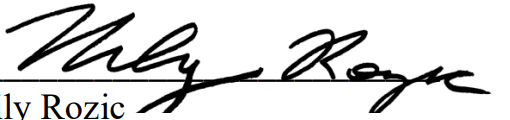
- Signature
- Website: State Assembly website

Nily Rozic (born March 15, 1986) is an American politician serving as a member of the New York State Assembly from the 25th district since 2013. A Democrat, her district spans the northeast portions of Queens, including the communities of Flushing, Fresh Meadows, Bayside, and Douglaston.

== Early life and education ==
Rozic was born in Jerusalem, Israel, to Argentine Jewish parents who immigrated there from Argentina. She graduated from Townsend Harris High School, before going on to earn degrees from New York University, and Syracuse University’s Maxwell School of Citizenship and Public Affairs.

== Career ==
Prior to her election, Rozic had been chief of staff to Assemblyman Brian Kavanagh.

=== 2012 election ===
In 2012, Rory Lancman, the former Democratic representative of the 25th District, decided to vacate his assembly seat. Rozic defeated Jerry Iannece from Bayside in the Democratic Party primary. Rozic received 55.6 percent of the vote to Iannece's 44.4. In the 2012 general election, Rozic went on to defeat Conservative Party nominee William N. Garifal Jr., and Republican candidate Abe Fuchs in the November general.

=== 2014 election ===
In the 2014 Assembly race, Rozic was unopposed in the Democratic primary. Rozic ran as the candidate of the Working Families Party and Independence Party. She was uncontested in the 2014 general election of the 25th Assembly District.

=== 2016 election ===
Rozic, running for a third term in 2016, was unopposed in the Democratic primary. Rozic was challenged by Republican candidate Usman Ali Chohan in 2016. In the general election, Rozic won her third term with 76.36 percent of the vote (about 22,000 voters).

=== Committee appointments ===
She is the Chair of the Assembly's Consumer Protection Committee. She is also a member of the Black, Puerto Rican, Hispanic & Asian Legislative Caucus and the Puerto Rican/Hispanic Task Force.

She serves on the Assembly's Rules, Ways & Means, Labor, and Corporations, Authorities and Commissions Committees. Previously, she chaired the State-Federal Relations Task Force. In 2017, Nily was named as chair of the Task Force on Women's Issues.

=== Tenure ===
In 2021, Rozic and New York State Senator John Liu first co-sponsored a bill to address and ease dangerous car driving within parking lots in New York State. They also co-sponsored a bill to expand foreign language interpretation and translation services within the hospitals and other medical facilities in New York in 2025.

== Awards and honors ==
In 2013, Rozic was named as a Rising Star on City & State's annual list of the Next Generation of Political Leaders for becoming an influential force in New York State politics as a young elected official.

== Personal life ==
Rozic lives in Fresh Meadows, Queens.
