= Thomas Van Arsdale =

Thomas Van Arsdale (February 16, 1924 – May 20, 2018) was the former head of the New York City Central Labor Council. He succeeded his father, Harry Van Arsdale, Jr., in the post by defeating Victor Gotbaum, who was then the executive director of American Federation of State, County and Municipal Employees.

Van Arsdale also served as business manager of the International Brotherhood of Electrical Workers Local #3, a position that he held for 12 terms. His most recent re-election coming in 2005. Van Arsdales's resignation as business manager in 2007 was followed by the unanimous election of Christopher Erikson to complete the unfinished term. He also served as the International Treasurer Emeritus of the same labor organization.

At the communion breakfast for the Catholic Council of Electrical Workers on May 2, 2010, the 43rd Rev. Patrick Morris, OFM Scholarship was in honor of Thomas, and was given to four people.

Van Arsdale died May 20, 2018
