= John F. Duane =

American politician

John Duane

Member of the New York State Assembly from the 25th district
- In office January 1, 1983 – December 31, 1984
- Preceded by: Douglas Prescott
- Succeeded by: Douglas Prescott

Personal details
- Born: 1952 or 1953 (age 72–73) New York City, New York, United States
- Party: Democratic
- Education: Colgate University (BA); Columbia Law School (JD)
- Occupation: Lawyer

John F. Duane (born 1952 or 1953) is a former American politician.

Duane contested the Democratic primary for New York's 25th State Assembly district in 1982, and defeated Douglas S. MacKay, before winning the general election against incumbent Douglas Prescott. Prescott defeated Duane in the 1984 general elections. He contested the 2010 Democratic primary for the 26th district, but was unable to secure the party's nomination. In April 2012, Duane unsuccessfully sought to represent New York City's 19th City Council district. In March 2018, Duane began another campaign for the 25th Assembly district's Democratic primary.
