= New York City's 24th City Council district =

- Boundaries following the 2020 census

Government
  - Councilmember: James F. Gennaro (D—Jamaica)

Population (2010)
  - Total: 167,448

Demographics
  - White: 33%
  - Asian: 29%
  - Hispanic: 22%
  - Black: 12%
  - Other: 5%

Registration
  - Democratic: 61.9%
  - Republican: 11.9%
  - No party preference: 23.4%
- Registered voters (2021) 94,791

New York City's 24th City Council district is one of 51 districts in the New York City Council. It has been represented by Democrat James F. Gennaro since a 2021 special election to replace fellow Democrat Rory Lancman; Gennaro previously held the seat from 2002 until 2013.

== Geography ==
District 24 covers a series of neighborhoods in central Queens, including some or all of Jamaica, Briarwood, Kew Gardens Hills, Fresh Meadows, Pomonok, Hillcrest, Jamaica Estates, Jamaica Hills, and Parkway Village. The lower half of Flushing Meadows–Corona Park is located within the district.

The district overlaps with Queens Community Boards 7, 8, and 12, and with New York's 5th and 6th congressional districts. It also overlaps with the 10th, 11th, 14th, 15th, and 16th districts of the New York State Senate, and with the 24th, 25th, 27th, 29th, and 32nd districts of the New York State Assembly.

== Recent election results ==
=== 2025 ===
2025 New York City Council election, District 24
Party	Candidate	Votes	%
Democratic	James Gennaro (incumbent)	30,221	98.4
Write-in		498	1.6
Total votes		30,719	100.0
Democratic hold			

=== 2023 (redistricting) ===
Due to redistricting and the 2020 changes to the New York City Charter, councilmembers elected during the 2021 and 2023 City Council elections will serve two-year terms, with full four-year terms resuming after the 2025 New York City Council elections.

2023 New York City Council election, District 24
Party	Candidate	Votes	%
Democratic	James Gennaro (incumbent)	7,383	74.3
Republican	Jonathan Rinaldi	2,045	
Conservative	Jonathan Rinaldi	277	
Total	Jonathan Rinaldi	2,322	23.4
Write-in		226	2.3
Total votes		9,931	100
Democratic hold			

=== 2021 ===
In 2019, voters in New York City approved Ballot Question 1, which implemented ranked-choice voting in all local elections. Under the new system, voters have the option to rank up to five candidates for every local office. Voters whose first-choice candidates fare poorly will have their votes redistributed to other candidates in their ranking until one candidate surpasses the 50 percent threshold. If one candidate surpasses 50 percent in first-choice votes, then ranked-choice tabulations will not occur.

An interactive map of District 24

2021 New York City Council election, District 24
Primary election
Party	Candidate	Votes	%
Democratic	James Gennaro (incumbent)	8,062	60.1
Democratic	Moumita Ahmed	3,020	22.5
Democratic	Mohammed Shabul Uddin	1,147	8.6
Democratic	Saifur Khan	1,123	8.4
Write-in		56	0.4
Total votes		13,408	100
Republican	Timothy Rosen	478	59.2
Republican	Angelo King	292	36.2
Write-in		37	4.6
Total votes		807	100
General election
Democratic	James Gennaro (incumbent)	12,740	72.8
Republican	Timothy Rosen	3,870	22.1
Conservative	Mujib Rahman	821	4.7
Write-in		69	0.4
Total votes		17,500	100
Democratic hold			

=== 2021 special ===
In November 2020, Councilman Rory Lancman took a position in the administration of Governor Andrew Cuomo, triggering a special election for his seat in February 2021. Like most municipal special elections in New York City, the race was officially nonpartisan, with all candidates running on ballot lines of their own creation. Following Ballot Question 1's approval in 2019, special elections will also utilize ranked-choice voting. The election was technically the first in the city's history to utilize ranked-choice voting, but because Gennaro won with a majority in the first round, ranked votes were not counted.

2021 New York City Council special election, District 24
Party	Candidate	Votes	%
Queens Strong	James Gennaro	4,078	60.1
Mo for the People	Moumita Ahmed	1,041	15.3
Soma for Queens	Soma Syed	537	7.9
A Better Queens	Deepti Sharma	322	4.7
Your Voice Matters	Dilip Nath	283	4.2
Community First	Neeta Jain	227	3.3
Unity	Mujib Rahman	192	2.8
United Citizens	Michael Earl Brown	96	1.4
Write-in		5	0.1
Total votes		6,782	100

=== 2017 ===
2017 New York City Council election, District 24
Primary election
Party	Candidate	Votes	%
Democratic	Rory Lancman (incumbent)	3,906	62.6
Democratic	Mohammad Rahman	2,299	36.8
Write-in		33	0.6
Total votes		6,238	100
General election
Democratic	Rory Lancman	12,455	
Working Families	Rory Lancman	1,165	
Total	Rory Lancman (incumbent)	13,620	88.4
Reform	Mohammad Rahman	1,701	11.0
Write-in		87	0.6
Total votes		15,408	100
Democratic hold			

=== 2013 ===
2013 New York City Council election, District 24
Primary election
Party	Candidate	Votes	%
Democratic	Rory Lancman	5,090	61.7
Democratic	Andrea Veras	1,751	21.2
Democratic	Mujib Rahman	1,403	17.0
Write-in		2	0.0
Total votes		8,246	100
General election
Democratic	Rory Lancman	11,744	
Working Families	Rory Lancman	655	
Total	Rory Lancman	12,399	73.7
Republican	Alexander Blishteyn	2,907	
Conservative	Alexander Blishteyn	462	
Total	Alexander Blishteyn	3,369	20.0
Faith and Values	Mujib Rahman	1,043	6.2
Write-in		18	0.1
Total votes		16,829	100
Democratic hold			
