= 2021 New York City Council election =

- November 2, 2021

All 51 seats on the New York City Council 26 seats needed for a majority
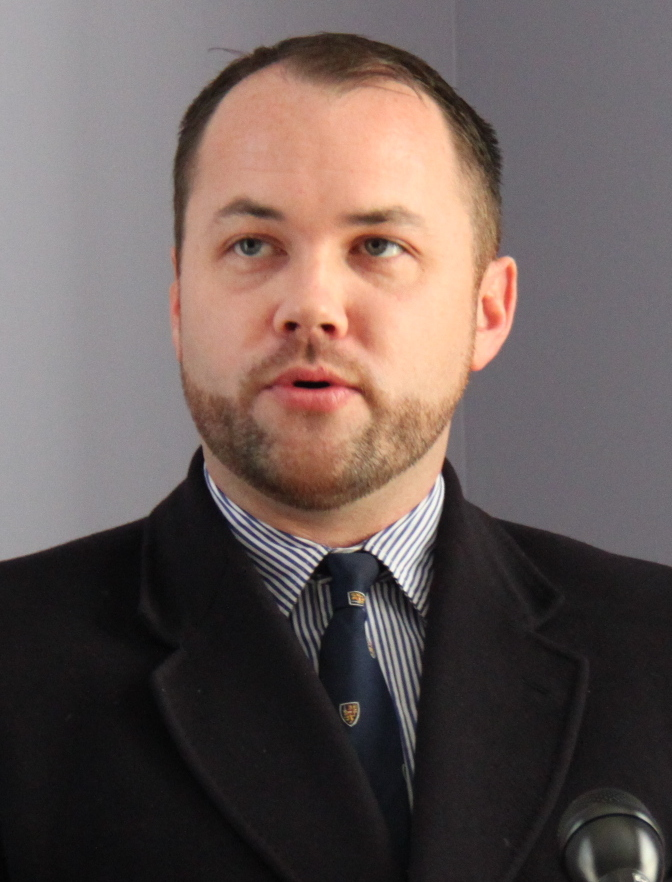

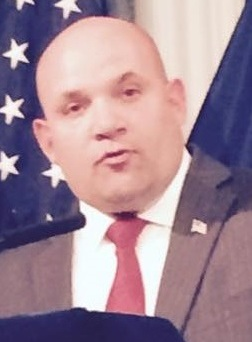
	Majority party	Minority party
Leader	Corey Johnson (term-limited)	Steven Matteo (term-limited)
Party	Democratic	Republican
Leader's seat	3rd-Manhattan	50th-Staten Island
Last election	48 seats (Note: While Robert Holden ran on the Republican Party line, he caucused with the Democrats.)	3 seats
Seats won	46	5
Seat change	▼2	▲2
Popular vote	770,683 (Note: Totals may be combined with that of other parties who cross-endorsed Democratic Party candidates via electoral fusion.)	247,238 (Note: Totals may be combined with that of other parties who cross-endorsed Republican Party candidates via electoral fusion.)
Percentage	72.83%	23.36%
- Results by district: Democratic: 50–60% 60–70% 70–80% 80–90% >90% Unopposed Republican: 40–50% 60–70% 70–80%
Speaker before election
Corey Johnson
Democratic
Elected Speaker
Adrienne Adams
Democratic

The 2021 New York City Council elections were held on November 2, 2021. The primary elections were held on June 22, 2021. There were several special elections for seats vacated in 2020 and early 2021; these special elections were the first to use ranked-choice voting in city council elections after it was approved by a ballot question in 2019 and the second to use ranked-choice voting since New York City repealed PR-STV in 1945. Due to redistricting after the 2020 Census, candidates also ran for two-year terms instead of four-year terms for the first time, stemming from the New York City Charter overhaul in 1989. Four-year terms will resume in the 2025 election after another two-year election in 2023.

== Incumbents not seeking re-election ==
=== Term-limited incumbents ===
28 council members (26 Democrats and 2 Republicans) are prevented from seeking a third (fourth for pre-2010 council members) consecutive term due to term limits that were renewed by voters in a ballot referendum in 2010.

District	Incumbent	Party
1	Margaret Chin	D
3	Corey Johnson	D
5	Ben Kallos	D
6	Helen Rosenthal	D
7	Mark Levine	D
10	Ydanis Rodríguez	D
14	Fernando Cabrera	D
16	Vanessa Gibson	D
19	Paul Vallone	D
20	Peter Koo	D
25	Danny Dromm	D
26	Jimmy Van Bramer	D
27	Daneek Miller	D
29	Karen Koslowitz	D
32	Eric Ulrich	R
33	Stephen Levin	D
34	Antonio Reynoso	D
35	Laurie Cumbo	D
36	Robert Cornegy	D
38	Carlos Menchaca	D
39	Brad Lander	D
40	Mathieu Eugene	D
42	Inez Barron	D
46	Alan Maisel	D
47	Mark Treyger	D
49	Debi Rose	D
50	Steven Matteo	R

=== Retiring incumbents ===
District	Incumbent	Party
13	Mark Gjonaj	D
18	Rubén Díaz Sr.	D
23	Barry Grodenchik	D

=== Incumbents defeated in primary ===
District	Incumbent	Party
9	Bill Perkins	D
37	Darma Diaz	D
41	Alicka Ampry-Samuel	D

=== Resigned before election ===
During the 2017–2021 council session, 8 incumbents have resigned before the election for various reasons.

District	Incumbent	Party	Reason
11	Andrew Cohen	D	Elected judge of the New York Supreme Court 12th Judicial District in 2020
12	Andy King	D	Expelled from the Council
15	Ritchie Torres	D	Elected to New York's 15th congressional district in 2020
22	Costa Constantinides	D	Resigned to take a position as CEO of Variety Boys and Girls Club of Queens
24	Rory Lancman	D	Appointed by Governor Andrew Cuomo as his Special Counsel for Ratepayer Protection
31	Donovan Richards	D	Elected Queens Borough President in 2020
37	Rafael Espinal	D	Resigned to take job with the Freelancers Union
45	Jumaane Williams	D	Elected New York City Public Advocate in 2019
48	Chaim Deutsch	D	Resigned after pleading guilty to tax fraud in federal court

== Manhattan ==
=== District 1 ===
The 1st district covers the very bottom of Manhattan, including the Financial District, Tribeca, and Soho. Incumbent Democrat Margaret Chin was term-limited and could not run for a fourth consecutive term. Christopher Marte was seen as the most progressive candidate in the race, while Jenny Low was noted for the major endorsements she had received and Gigi Li had outgoing councilwoman Chin's support. Marte's campaign was bolstered by anger within the district at Chin's ties to real-estate developers, as well as by name recognition Marte had gained while attempting to primary Chin in the previous council election.

==== Democratic primary ====
Candidates

- Susan Damplo, attorney
- Sean Hayes, attorney and law professor
- Tiffany Johnson-Winbush, former member of Manhattan Community Board 1
- Susan Lee, author and non-profit executive
- Gigi Li, Chief of Staff to Margaret Chin
- Jenny Low, political staffer
- Maud Maron, attorney
- Christopher Marte, activist
- Denny Salas, activist

Withdrawn

- Lester Chang
- Yubao Dai
- Dennis Mikhalsky

Endorsements

Gigi Li

State legislators

- Catalina Cruz, New York State Assemblymember for the 39th district

Local officials

- Diana Ayala, New York City Councilwoman from the 8th district
- Margaret Chin, New York City Councilwoman from the 1st district
- Debi Rose, New York City Councilwoman from the 49th district
- Helen Rosenthal, New York City Councilwoman from the 6th district

Individuals

- Melissa Mark-Viverito, former Speaker of the New York City Council
- Andrew Yang, entrepreneur, former Presidential Ambassador for Global Entrepreneurship, former candidate for the 2020 United States presidential election, candidate for 2021 New York City mayoral election
Jenny Low

Federal legislators

- Carolyn Maloney, U.S. Representative from New York's 12th congressional district
- Grace Meng, U.S. Representative from New York's 4th congressional district
- Jerry Nadler, U.S. Representative from New York's 10th congressional district
- Nydia Velázquez, U.S. Representative from New York's 7th congressional district

State legislators

- John Liu, New York State Senator for the 11th district
- Yuh-Line Niou, NY State Assemblymember

Local officials

- Carlina Rivera, New York City Councilmember for the 2nd District

Labor unions

- Communications Workers of America, District 1
- District Council 37
- SEIU 32BJ
- United Federation of Teachers

Organizations

- District Council 37
- Jim Owles Liberal Democratic Club
- New York League of Conservation Voters
- Stonewall Democratic Club of New York City

Newspapers and publications

- The Indypendent (second choice)
Maud Maron

Organizations

- Police Benevolent Association of the City of New York
Christopher Marte

Local officials

- Kathryn E. Freed, former New York City councilmember

Labor unions

- Professional Staff Congress, CUNY
- Sheet Metal Workers' International Association Local 28

Organizations

- Freelancers Union
- Run for Something
- Stonewall Democratic Club of New York City (second choice)

Newspapers and publications

- The Indypendent (first choice)

===== Results =====
2021 New York City Council District 1 Democratic primary results
Party	Candidate	Maximum round	Maximum votes	Share in maximum round	Maximum votes First round votes Transfer votes
Democratic	Christopher Marte	8	10,785	60.5%	
Democratic	Jenny Low	8	7,054	39.5%	
Democratic	Gigi Li	7	4,662	23.9%	
Democratic	Maud Maron	5	2,495	12.1%	
Democratic	Susan Lee	4	2,020	9.6%	
Democratic	Sean C. Hayes	3	928	4.0%	
Democratic	Tiffany Johnson-Winbush	3	809	3.5%	
Democratic	Susan Damplo	2	344	1.6%	
Democratic	Denny R. Salas	2	292	1.3%	
Write-in		1	43	0.2%	

==== Republican primary ====
- Jacqueline Toboroff

Endorsements

Jacqueline Toboroff

Organizations

- New York Young Republican Club

==== General election ====
General election
Party	Candidate	Votes	%
Democratic	Christopher Marte	16,733	72.1%
Independent	Maud Maron	3,265	14.1%
Republican	Jacqueline Toboroff	3,166	13.6%
Write-in		48	0.2%
Total votes		23,212	100%

=== District 2 ===
The 2nd district covers parts of the Lower East Side in Manhattan. Incumbent Democrat Carlina Rivera was running for reelection.

==== Democratic primary ====
===== Candidates =====
- Erin Hussein, labor unionist
- Carlina Rivera, incumbent Councillor

Withdrawn

- Juan Pagan

===== Endorsements =====
Carlina Rivera

Labor unions

- Professional Staff Congress, CUNY
- United Federation of Teachers

Organizations

- EMILY's List
- New York League of Conservation Voters
- Our Revolution
- Stonewall Democratic Club of New York City
- Working Families Party
Erin Hussein

Newspapers and publications

- The Indypendent

===== Democratic primary =====
Democratic primary
Party	Candidate	Votes	%
Democratic	Carlina Rivera (incumbent)	15,464	72.5%
Democratic	Erin Hussein	5,709	26.8%
Democratic	Write-ins	169	0.8%
Total votes		21,342	100%

==== General election ====
General election
Party	Candidate	Votes	%
Democratic	Carlina Rivera (incumbent)	18,716	79.8%
Neighborhood Party	Allie Ryan	2,684	11.5%
Independent	Juan Pagan	1,925	8.2%
Write-in		116	0.5%
Total votes		23,441	100%

=== District 3 ===
The 3rd district covers parts of the West Side of Manhattan, including Chelsea, West Midtown, and Greenwich Village. Incumbent Democrat and current Council Speaker Corey Johnson was term-limited and could not run for a third consecutive term.

==== Democratic primary ====
2021 New York City Council District 3 Democratic primary results
Party	Candidate	Maximum round	Maximum votes	Share in maximum round	Maximum votes First round votes Transfer votes
Democratic	Erik Bottcher	8	17,027	71.4%	
Democratic	Arthur Schwartz	8	7,054	28.6%	
Democratic	Leslie Boghosian Murphy	7	5,669	21.6%	
Democratic	Aleta LaFargue	5	3,459	12.6%	
Democratic	Marni Halasa	4	2,442	8.7%	
Democratic	Phelan D. Fitzpatrick	3	1,597	5.6%	
Write-in		1	125	0.4%	

==== Endorsements ====
Leslie Boghosian Murphy

Organizations

- Democracy for America
Erik Bottcher

Federal legislators

- Ritchie Torres, House of Representatives Member from Bronx County (2021–present)

State legislators

- Deborah Glick, New York State Assemblymember for the 66th district (1994–present)

Labor unions

- New York City Central Labor Council
- Professional Staff Congress, CUNY
- Stonewall Democratic Club of New York City
- United Federation of Teachers

Organizations

- Citizens Union
- New York League of Conservation Voters
Arthur Schwartz

Organizations

- Our Revolution

==== General election ====
General election
Party	Candidate	Votes	%
Democratic	Erik Bottcher	23,347	99.0%
Write-in		286	1.0%
Total votes		23,810	100%

=== District 4 ===
The 4th district covers parts of the Lower East Side, East Midtown, and parts of the Upper East Side in Manhattan. The incumbent was Democrat Keith Powers, who won re-election defeating Republican David Casavis.

==== Democratic primary ====
Incumbent Councilman Keith Powers won the Democratic nomination unopposed.

Withdrawn

- Jordana Lusk

==== General election ====
General election
Party	Candidate	Votes	%
Democratic	Keith Powers	18,285	74.0%
Republican	David Casavis	6,018	24.3%
Independent/Libertarian	David Casavis	403	1.6%
Total	David Casavis	6,421	26.0
Write-in		37	0.6%
Total votes		24,743	100

==== Endorsements ====
Keith Powers

Labor unions

- United Federation of Teachers

Organizations

- Stonewall Democratic Club of New York City

=== District 5 ===
The 5th district covers parts of the Upper East Side in Manhattan. Incumbent Democrat Ben Kallos was term-limited and could not run for a third consecutive term. He ran for Manhattan Borough President.

==== Democratic primary ====
2021 New York City Council District 5 Democratic primary results
Party	Candidate	Maximum round	Maximum votes	Share in maximum round	Maximum votes First round votes Transfer votes
Democratic	Julie Menin	6	12,083	56.0%	
Democratic	Tricia Shimamura	6	9,485	44.0%	
Democratic	Rebecca Lamorte	5	4,699	20.3%	
Democratic	Kim Moscaritolo	4	3,534	14.8%	
Democratic	Billy Freeland	3	2,853	11.6%	
Democratic	Christopher Sosa	2	1,491	5.9%	
Democratic	Marco Tamayo	2	671	2.6%	
Write-in		1	78	0.3%	

Withdrawn

- Joshua Kravitz

==== Endorsements ====
Billy Freeland

Organizations

- Our Revolution (co-endorsed with Lamorte)
- Stonewall Democratic Club of New York City (first choice)
Rebecca Lamorte

Organizations

- Our Revolution (co-endorsed with Freeland)
Julie Menin

Local officials

- Diana Ayala, New York City Councilmember for the 8th district
- Mark Green, former New York City Public Advocate
- Melissa Mark-Viverito, former Speaker of the New York City Council
- Keith Powers, New York City Councilmember for the 4th district
- Carlina Rivera, New York City Councilmember for the 2nd District

Labor unions

- Communications Workers of America District 1
- District Council 37
- Professional Staff Congress, CUNY
- SEIU 32BJ
- United Federation of Teachers

Organizations

- Citizens Union
- New York League of Conservation Voters
- Stonewall Democratic Club of New York City (second choice)

Individuals

- Robert De Niro, actor and director
Kim Moscaritolo

State legislators

- Liz Krueger, New York State Senator for New York's 28th State Senate district (co-endorsed along with Tricia Shimamura)
- Jessica Ramos, New York State Senator for New York's 13th State Senate district

Organizations

- Stonewall Democratic Club of New York City (third choice)
Tricia Shimamura

Federal legislators

- Carolyn Maloney, U.S. Representative for New York's 12th congressional district

State legislators

- Liz Krueger, New York State Senator for New York's 28th State Senate district (co-endorsed along with Kim Moscaritolo)

Organizations

- Run for Something
Chris Sosa

Organizations

- Stonewall Democratic Club of New York City (fourth choice)

==== General election ====
General election
Party	Candidate	Votes	%
Democratic	Julie Menin	20,216	74.4
Republican	Mark Foley	6,579	24.1%
Liberal	Mark Foley	364	1.3%
Total	Mark Foley	6,943	25.6
Write-in		95	0.3%
Total votes		27,254	100

=== District 6 ===
The 6th district covers most of the Upper West Side in Manhattan. Incumbent Democrat Helen Rosenthal was term-limited and could not run for a third consecutive term. She filed to run for New York City Comptroller but dropped out of the race. Sara Lind and Jeffrey Omura had an alliance during the campaign, with Lind's campaign asking voters to rank Omura second and Omura's campaign asking voters to rank Lind second. Gale Brewer, who was the Manhattan Borough President at the time and held this seat from 2002 to 2013, won the Democratic nomination.

==== Democratic primary ====
===== Candidates =====
- Gale Brewer, Manhattan Borough President
- Maria Danzilo, attorney
- David Gold, non-profit executive
- Sara Lind, attorney
- Jeffrey Omura, actor and labor unionist
- Zack Weiner, screenwriter and film producer

Withdrawn

- Seth Rosen (endorsed Sara Lind)
- David Zelman

===== Endorsements =====
Gale Brewer

Federal officials

- Adriano Espaillat, U.S. Representative from NY-13
- Jerry Nadler, U.S. Representative from NY-10

State officials

- Richard N. Gottfried, State Assemblymember from the 75th district
- Linda Rosenthal, State Assemblymember from the 67th district
- José M. Serrano, State Senator from the 29th district

Labor unions

- Communications Workers of America District 1
- District Council 37
- New York City Central Labor Council
- Professional Staff Congress, CUNY
- SEIU 32BJ
- United Federation of Teachers

Organizations

- Citizens Union (first choice)
- New York League of Conservation Voters
- Our Revolution
- Stonewall Democratic Club of New York City

Newspapers and publications

- New York Amsterdam News
Sara Lind

Individuals

- Melissa Mark-Viverito, former speaker of the New York City Council
- Jeffrey Omura, actor and labor unionist (second choice)

Organizations

- Jim Owles Liberal Democratic Club
- Run for Something
Jeffrey Omura

Organizations

- Citizens Union (second choice)

===== Results =====
Democratic primary
Party	Candidate	Votes	%
Democratic	Gale Brewer	21,594	54.8%
Democratic	Maria Danzilo	5,834	14.8%
Democratic	Sara Lind	5,166	13.1%
Democratic	Jeffrey Omura	3,922	9.9%
Democratic	David Gold	1,867	4.7%
Democratic	Zack Weiner	959	2.4%
Democratic	Write-ins	57	0.1%
Total votes		39,399	100.0%

==== General election ====
General election
Party	Candidate	Votes	%
Democratic	Gale Brewer	30,076	86.2%
Republican	Nancy Sliwa	4,634	13.2%
Write-in		176	0.5%
Total votes			100

=== District 7 ===
The 7th district covers West Harlem and Hamilton Heights in Manhattan. Incumbent Democrat Mark Levine was term-limited and could not run for a third consecutive term. Levine was running for Manhattan Borough President. Shaun Abreu was considered the frontrunner in the race, while five of his opponents – Maria Ordoñez, Stacy Lynch, Marti Allen-Cummings, Dan Cohen, and Corey Ortega – formed a ranked-choice coalition to oppose him.

==== Democratic primary ====
2021 New York City Council District 7 Democratic primary results
Party	Candidate	Maximum round	Maximum votes	Share in maximum round	Maximum votes First round votes Transfer votes
Democratic	Shaun Abreu	13	10,491	63.0%	
Democratic	Maria Ordoñez	13	6,165	37.0%	
Democratic	Stacy Lynch	12	4,180	22.7%	
Democratic	Daniel Cohen	10	3,393	17.4%	
Democratic	Marti Allen-Cummings	9	2,973	14.7%	
Democratic	Luis Tejada	8	2,605	12.0%	
Democratic	Keith Harris	7	1,375	6.2%	
Democratic	Corey Ortega	6	1,283	4.1%	
Democratic	Miguel Estrella	5	860	3.4%	
Democratic	Carmen Quinones	4	818	3.2%	
Democratic	Raymond Sanchez	3	502	2.1%	
Democratic	Lena Melendez	2	392	1.7%	
Write-in		1	73	0.3%	

Withdrawn

- Alberto Aguilar III
- Jeanette Toomer

==== Endorsements ====
Shaun Abreu

Federal legislators

- Ritchie Torres, United States Representative for New York's 15th congressional district

Local officials

- Mark Levine, New York City Councilmember for the 7th district

Labor unions

- Communications Workers of America, District 1
- Council of School Supervisors & Administrators
- District Council 37
- New York City Central Labor Council
- SEIU 32BJ

Organizations

- Citizens Union
- Jim Owles Liberal Democratic Club
- New York League of Conservation Voters
- Stonewall Democratic Club of New York City (second choice)
Marti Allen-Cummings

State legislators

- Yuh-Line Niou, NY State Assemblymember
- Julia Salazar, New York State Senator for New York's 18th State Senate district

Organizations

- LGBTQ Victory Fund
- Run for Something
- Stonewall Democratic Club of New York City (first choice)

Newspapers and publications

- The Indypendent (second choice)
Dan Cohen

Newspapers and publications

- The Indypendent (third choice)
Stacy Lynch

Executive officials

- Hillary Clinton, former United States Secretary of State; former U.S. Senator from New York; former First Lady of the United States

Labor unions

- United Federation of Teachers

Newspapers and publications

- New York Amsterdam News
Maria Ordoñez

Labor unions

- Professional Staff Congress, CUNY

Organizations

- Our Revolution

Newspapers and publications

- The Indypendent (first choice)

==== General election ====
General election
Party	Candidate	Votes	%
Democratic	Shaun Abreu	18,250	88.7%
Black Women Lead	Carmen R. Quinones	1,507	7.3%
Black Lives Matter Party	Jomo Williams	684	3.3%
Write-in		123	0.6%
Total votes		20,564	100%

=== District 9 ===
The 9th district covers most of the central part of Harlem in Manhattan. Incumbent Democrat Bill Perkins ran for reelection. He is currently behind challenger Kristin Richardson Jordan, a member of the Democratic Socialists of America, by 104 votes in the final RCV round. Due to the close margin, the race underwent a manual recount. On August 9, 2021, Perkins conceded the race to Jordan. The recount was completed on August 18, with Jordan winning by 114 votes.

==== Democratic primary ====
===== Candidates =====
- William Allen, professor and founder of the Uptown Democratic Club
- Cordell Cleare, Democratic District Leader in the 70th State Assembly district
- Joshua Clennon, treasurer of Manhattan Community Board 10
- William Council, coach
- Pierre Gooding, deacon and attorney
- Kristin Richardson Jordan, poet and activist
- Ruth McDaniels, former NYPD supervisor
- Bernadette McNear, program director
- Athena Moore, activist
- Bill Perkins, incumbent Councillor
- Mario Rosser, partnership manager
- Sheba Simpson, educator
- Keith Taylor, member of Manhattan Community Board 10

Withdrawn

- Malik Wright, political operative

===== Endorsements =====
William Allen

State officials

- Brad Hoylman, State Senator

Individuals

- Andrew Yang, entrepreneur; candidate for President of the United States in 2020 and Mayor of New York in 2021
Cordell Cleare

Local officials

- Jumaane Williams, New York City Public Advocate

Labor unions

- 1199SEIU United Healthcare Workers East

Organizations

- Make the Road Action

Newspapers and publications

- New York Amsterdam News (second choice)
Pierre Gooding

Individuals

- Black Rob, rapper (deceased)
Kristin R. Jordan

Federal officials

- Alexandria Ocasio-Cortez, U.S. Representative from NY-14

Local officials

- Brad Lander, NYC Councillor

Organizations

- Jim Owles Liberal Democratic Club
- LGBTQ Victory Fund
- New York Young Communist League
- Stonewall Democratic Club of New York City (first choice)
- Sunrise Movement NYC

Newspapers and publications

- The Indypendent
Athena Moore

Federal officials

- Yvette Clarke, U.S. Representative from NY-09

Individuals

- Hazel Nell Dukes, former President of the NAACP

Organizations

- Stonewall Democratic Club of New York City (third choice)

Newspapers and publications

- New York Amsterdam News (first choice)
Bill Perkins

Labor unions

- United Federation of Teachers

Organizations

- Stonewall Democratic Club of New York City (second choice)
Mario Rosser

Organizations

- Black Lives Matter PAC
Keith Taylor

Labor unions

- Correction Officers' Benevolent Association

===== Results =====
2021 New York City Council District 9 Democratic primary results
Party	Candidate	Maximum round	Maximum votes	Share in maximum round	Maximum votes First round votes Transfer votes
Democratic	Kristin Richardson Jordan	13	9,034	50.3%	
Democratic	Bill Perkins (incumbent)	13	8,920	49.7%	
Democratic	Athena Moore	12	5,796	27.7%	
Democratic	Cordell Cleare	11	3,815	17.1%	
Democratic	Mario Rosser	10	3,002	12.8%	
Democratic	William Allen	9	2,125	8.8%	
Democratic	Keith Taylor	8	1,808	7.4%	
Democratic	Joshua Clennon	7	1,559	6.3%	
Democratic	Ruth McDaniels	6	1,142	4.6%	
Democratic	Pierre Gooding	5	802	3.2%	
Democratic	Billy Council	4	758	3.0%	
Democratic	Sheba Simpson-Amsterdam	3	604	2.4%	
Democratic	Bernadette McNear	2	335	1.3%	
Write-in		1	47	0.2%	

==== General election ====
General election
Party	Candidate	Votes	%
Democratic	Kristin Richardson Jordan	22,419	94.2
Republican	Alphesus Marcus	1,369	5.8
Write-in		94	0.3%
Total votes		23,882	100

=== District 10 ===
The 10th district covers the northernmost part of Manhattan, including Washington Heights, Inwood, and Marble Hill. Incumbent Democrat Ydanis Rodríguez was term-limited and could not run for a fourth consecutive term.

==== Democratic primary ====
===== Candidates =====
- James Behr, attorney and author
- Francesca Castellanos, activist
- Carmen De La Rosa, State Assemblymember
- Angela Fernandez, former director of the New York State Division of Human Rights
- Johanna Garcia, Chief of Staff to Robert Jackson
- Thomas Leon, candidate for New York State Senate in 2018
- Josue Perez, educator
- Tirso Pina, candidate for New York City Council in 2001

Withdrawn

- Manny De Los Santos
- Everett Reed

==== Candidate ====
- Edwin de la Cruz

===== Endorsements =====
Angela Fernandez

Organizations

- American Institute of Architects
Johanna Garcia

State legislators

- Alessandra Biaggi, New York State Senator for New York's 34th State Senate district
- Brad Hoylman, New York State Senator for the 27th district
- Robert Jackson, New York State Senator for New York's 31st State Senate district
- John Liu, New York State Senator for New York's 11th State Senate district

Organizations

- Citizen Action of New York (first choice)
- Democracy for America
- Stonewall Democratic Club of New York City (second choice)
- Working Families Party

Individuals

- Cynthia Nixon, activist, actress, and former candidate for Governor of New York
- Zephyr Teachout, attorney, professor, former candidate for Governor of New York and Attorney General of New York
Josue Perez

Labor unions

- Correction Officers' Benevolent Association
Carmen De La Rosa

State legislators

- Jessica Ramos, New York State Senator for New York's 13th State Senate district
- Karines Reyes, New York State Assemblymember for the 87th district

Local officials

- Carlina Rivera, New York City Councilmember for the 2nd District
- Scott Stringer, New York City Comptroller

Labor unions

- Communications Workers of America District 1
- District Council 37
- Retail, Wholesale and Department Store Union
- SEIU 32BJ
- United Federation of Teachers

Organizations

- Citizen Action of New York (second choice)
- New York League of Conservation Voters
- Stonewall Democratic Club of New York City (first choice)

===== Results =====
2021 New York City Council District 10 Democratic primary results
Party	Candidate	Maximum round	Maximum votes	Share in maximum round	Maximum votes First round votes Transfer votes
Democratic	Carmen De La Rosa	4	10,318	59.8%	
Democratic	Johanna Garcia	4	6,949	40.2%	
Democratic	Angela Fernandez	3	3,997	21.7%	
Democratic	James Behr	2	729	3.7%	
Democratic	Francesca Castellanos	2	663	3.4%	
Democratic	Thomas Leon	2	600	3.1%	
Democratic	Josue Perez	2	590	3.0%	
Democratic	Tirso Pina	2	331	1.7%	
Write-in		1	60	0.3%	

==== General election ====
General election
Party	Candidate	Votes	%
Democratic	Carmen De La Rosa	16,404	85.7%
Republican	Edwin de La Cruz	2,543	13.2%
Total votes		19,137	100

== Manhattan/Bronx crossover ==
=== District 8 ===
The 8th district covers East Harlem in Manhattan, Mott Haven and parts of High Bridge in The Bronx, and Randalls Island. Incumbent Democrat Diana Ayala was running for reelection.

==== Democratic primary ====
===== Candidates =====
- Diana Ayala, incumbent Councillor
- Antoinette Glover, pastor
- Tamika Mapp, businesswoman and veteran
- Manuel Onativia, consultant

===== Endorsements =====
Diana Ayala

Labor unions

- United Federation of Teachers

Organizations

- Our Revolution
- Stonewall Democratic Club of New York City

===== Results =====
Democratic primary
Party	Candidate	Votes	%
Democratic	Diana Ayala (incumbent)	6,621	56.5%
Democratic	Tamika Mapp	3,391	28.9%
Democratic	Antoinette D. Glover	1,077	9.2%
Democratic	Manuel Onativia	512	4.4%
Democratic	Write-ins	121	1.0%
Total votes		11,722	100.0%

==== General election ====
General election
Party	Candidate	Votes	%
Democratic	Diana Ayala (incumbent)	11,288	98.8%
Write-in		135	1.1%
Total votes		11,423	100

== Bronx ==
=== District 11 ===
The 11th district covers the most northwestern part of the Bronx, including Riverdale, Fieldston, Spuyten Devil, Kingsbridge, parts of Bedford Park, Norwood, Woodlawn, and parts of Wakefield. This seat is currently filled by Eric Dinowitz. The incumbent was Democrat Andrew Cohen, who was elected judge of the New York Supreme Court 12th Judicial District in 2020. A non-partisan special election was held on March 23, 2021, with the winner being eligible to run for a full term.

The election used ranked choice voting, with Eric Dinowitz remaining in the lead for all six rounds.

==== Special election ====
The special election was nonpartisan.

A bar graph visualizing each round of the ranked choice voting election 2021 NYC special election in the 11th District

New York City 11th (special election) Council District
Candidate	Round 1		Round 2		Round 3		Round 4		Round 5		Round 6	
Candidate	Votes	%	Votes	%	Votes	%	Votes	%	Votes	%	Votes	%
Eric Dinowitz	4401	46.8%	4407	46.9%	4458	47.5%	4500	48.4%	4920	54.6%	5579	63.6%
Mino Lora	2129	22.6%	2133	22.7%	2175	23.2%	2183	23.5%	2401	26.7%	3188	36.4%
Jessica Haller	1383	14.7%	1385	14.7%	1407	15.0%	1416	15.2%	1682	18.7%	Eliminated	
Daniel Padernacht	1110	11.8%	1113	11.8%	1137	12.1%	1204	12.9%	Eliminated			
Kevin Pazmino	194	2.1%	195	2.1%	200	2.1%	Eliminated					
Carlton Berkley	172	1.8%	172	1.8%	Eliminated							
Undeclared Write-ins	24	0.3%	Eliminated									
Inactive ballots	0 ballots		8 ballots		36 ballots		110 ballots		410 ballots		646 ballots	

Withdrawn

- Abigail Martin (withdrew from the special election but would be in the June primary)
- Marcos Sierra (withdrew from the special election but would be in the June primary)

==== Democratic primary ====
2021 New York City Council District 11 Democratic primary results
Party	Candidate	Maximum round	Maximum votes	Share in maximum round	Maximum votes First round votes Transfer votes
Democratic	Eric Dinowitz	6	9,491	61.3%	
Democratic	Mino Lora	6	5,994	38.7%	
Democratic	Abigail Martin	5	3,005	18.4%	
Democratic	Daniel Padernacht	3	1,102	6.6%	
Democratic	Jessica Haller	3	1,059	6.4%	
Democratic	Marcos Sierra	2	356	2.1%	
Democratic	Carlton Berkley	2	314	1.8%	
Write-in		1	36	0.2%	

Withdrawn

- Jessica Haller
- Nayma Silver
- Dionel Then

==== Endorsements ====
Eric Dinowitz

Federal legislators

- Adriano Espaillat, U.S. Representative from the 13th district
- Ritchie Torres, U.S. Representative from 15th district

State legislators

- Jamaal Bailey, New York State Senator from 36th district

Local officials

- Daniel Dromm, New York City Councilmember from the 25th district
- Mark Treyger, New York City Councilmember from the 47th district

Labor unions

- District Council 37
- Retail, Wholesale and Department Store Union
- United Federation of Teachers

Organizations

- Stonewall Democratic Club of New York City (first choice)
Jessica Haller (withdrawn)

State legislators

- Alessandra Biaggi, New York State Senator from 34th district—co-endorsement with Mino Lora
- Gustavo Rivera, New York State Senator from 33rd district (ranked second)

Local officials

- Brad Lander, New York City Councilmember for the 39th district—co-endorsement with Mino Lora

Organizations

- Democracy for America
- New York League of Conservation Voters
Mino Lora

State legislators

- Alessandra Biaggi, New York State Senator from 34th district—co-endorsement with Jessica Haller
- Yuh-Line Niou, NY State Assemblymember
- Gustavo Rivera, New York State Senator from 33rd district (ranked first)

Local officials

- Brad Lander, New York City Councilmember for the 39th district—co-endorsement with Jessica Haller
- Jimmy Van Bramer, New York City Councilmember for the 26th district

Labor unions

- Communications Workers of America District 1
- UNITE HERE Local 100

Organizations

- Citizen Action of New York
- Run for Something
- Stonewall Democratic Club of New York City (second choice)
- Working Families Party

=== District 12 ===
The 12th district covers the most northeastern part of the Bronx, including Williamsbridge, Co-Op City, parts of Allerton, Eastchester, and parts of Wakefield. Incumbent Democrat Andy King, who was already term-limited, was expelled on October 5, 2020. A special election to determine his replacement took place on December 22, 2020, with Kevin Riley elected the winner. He was running for a full term.

==== Democratic primary ====
===== Candidates =====
- Pamela Hamilton-Johnson, non-profit executive
- Shanequa Martin, social worker
- Kevin Riley, incumbent Councillor

===== Endorsements =====
Kevin Riley

Labor unions

- United Federation of Teachers

===== Results =====
2021 New York City Council District 12 Democratic primary results
Party	Candidate	Maximum round	Maximum votes	Share in maximum round	Maximum votes First round votes Transfer votes
Democratic	Kevin Riley	3	9,595	59.1%	
Democratic	Pamela Hamilton-Johnson	3	6,643	40.9%	
Democratic	Shanequa Martin	2	3,660	21.1%	
Write-in		1	209	1.2%	

=== District 13 ===
The 13th district includes the most southeastern part of the Bronx, including Baychester, parts of Allerton, Pelham Parkway, Morris Park, Pelham Bay, Middletown, Country Club, Throggs Neck, and City Island. Incumbent Democrat Mark Gjonaj was eligible to run for a second term, but chose to retire instead.

==== Democratic primary ====
===== Candidates =====
- Irene Estrada, former member of Bronx Community Board 11
- Monique Johnson, leader of the Throgs Neck Residents Association
- John Perez, former United States Army Ambassador
- Marilyn Soto, former educator
- Marjorie Velázquez, member of Bronx Community Board 10

===== Endorsements =====
Marjorie Velazquez

Federal legislators

- Alexandria Ocasio-Cortez, U.S. Representative for New York's 14th congressional district (2019–present)
- Ritchie Torres, U.S. Representative for New York's 15th congressional district

State officials

- Alessandra Biaggi, state senator

Local officials

- Rubén Díaz Jr., Bronx Borough President
- Carlina Rivera, New York City Councilmember for the 2nd District

Labor unions

- 1199 SEIU
- Communications Workers of America District 1
- United Federation of Teachers

Organizations

- Our Revolution
- Run for Something
- Stonewall Democratic Club of New York City
- Working Families Party

Newspapers and publications

- New York Amsterdam News

===== Results =====
Democratic primary
Party	Candidate	Votes	%
Democratic	Marjorie Velázquez	5,608	56.3%
Democratic	Monique Johnson	2,575	25.9%
Democratic	Irene Estrada	600	6.0%
Democratic	Marilyn Soto	585	5.9%
Democratic	John Perez	545	5.5%
Democratic	Write-ins	47	0.5%
Total votes		9,960	100.0%

==== General election ====
General election
Party	Candidate	Votes	%
Democratic	Marjorie Velázquez	9,427	55.2%
Republican	Aleksander Mici	7,603	44.5%
Write-in		36	0.2%
Total votes		17,066	100

=== District 14 ===
The 14th district includes a section of the West Bronx, including Kingsbridge Heights, parts of Bedford Park, parts of Fordham, University Heights, parts of Tremont, and parts of Morris Heights. Incumbent Democrat Fernando Cabrera was term-limited and could not run for a fourth consecutive term. He filed to run for Bronx Borough President.

==== Democratic primary ====
2021 New York City Council District 14 Democratic primary results
Party	Candidate	Maximum round	Maximum votes	Share in maximum round	Maximum votes First round votes Transfer votes
Democratic	Pierina Sanchez	6	4,887	62.3%	
Democratic	Yudelka Tapia	6	2,957	37.7%	
Democratic	Adolfo Abreu	5	2,105	24.5%	
Democratic	Haile Rivera	4	1,102	12.3%	
Democratic	Fernando Aquino	3	939	10.1%	
Democratic	Socrates Solano	2	175	1.9%	
Write-in		1	30	0.3%	

==== Endorsements ====
Adolfo Abreu

Federal legislators

- Alexandria Ocasio-Cortez, United States Representative for New York's 14th congressional district (2019–present) (first choice)
- Bernie Sanders, US Senator from Vermont (2007–present)

State legislators

- Jabari Brisport, New York State Senator for the 25th district
- Phara Souffrant Forrest, New York State Assemblymember for the 57th district
- Marcela Mitaynes, New York State Assemblymember for the 51st district

Individuals

- Cynthia Nixon, activist, actress, and former candidate for Governor of New York

Labor unions

- Professional Staff Congress, CUNY

Organizations

- Democratic Socialists of America
- New York City Democratic Socialists of America
- Our Revolution
- Run for Something
- Stonewall Democratic Club of New York City (second choice)
- Working Families Party

Newspapers and publications

- The Indypendent (first choice)
Pierina Sanchez

Federal legislators

- Adriano Espaillat, Member of the United States House of Representatives for the New York's 13th congressional district
- Ritchie Torres, Member of the United States House of Representatives for the New York's 15th congressional district

State legislators

- Catalina Cruz, New York State Assemblymember for the 39th district

Local officials

- Carlina Rivera, New York City Councilmember for the 2nd District

Labor unions

- New York City Central Labor Council
- Retail, Wholesale and Department Store Union
- United Federation of Teachers

Organizations

- Jim Owles Liberal Democratic Club
- New York League of Conservation Voters
- Run for Something

Newspapers and publications

- The Indypendent (second choice)
Yudelka Tapia

Individuals

- Michelle Caruso-Cabrera, former journalist; candidate for New York City Comptroller

=== District 15 ===
The 15th district covers parts of the North Central Bronx, including Belmont, West Farms, parts of Bedford Park, parts of Fordham, parts of Tremont, and Little Yemen. This seat is currently filled by Oswald Feliz. The incumbent was Democrat Ritchie Torres, was elected to New York's 15th congressional district in 2020. A special election was held on March 23, 2021, with the winner being eligible to run for a full term.

The election used ranked choice voting, with Oswald Feliz remaining in the lead for all six rounds.

==== Special election ====
The special election was nonpartisan.

A bar graph visualizing each round of the ranked choice voting election 2021 NYC special election in the 15th District

New York City 15th (special election) Council District
Candidate	Round 1		Round 2		Round 3		Round 4		Round 5		Round 6		Round 7		Round 8		Round 9		Round 10	
Candidate	Votes	%	Votes	%	Votes	%	Votes	%	Votes	%	Votes	%	Votes	%	Votes	%	Votes	%	Votes	%
Oswald Feliz	1070	27.9%	1071	28.0%	1074	28.2%	1082	28.6%	1091	29.0%	1110	29.8%	1132	30.7%	1160	31.7%	1310	37.5%	1766	56.5%
Ischia J. Bravo	815	21.3%	815	21.3%	818	21.4%	824	21.7%	834	22.2%	846	22.7%	860	23.3%	897	24.5%	1118	32.0%	1362	43.5%
John E. Sanchez	786	20.5%	787	20.6%	795	20.8%	814	21.5%	823	21.9%	835	22.4%	849	23.0%	885	24.2%	1062	30.4%	Eliminated	
Elisa Crespo	592	15.4%	592	15.5%	597	15.6%	609	16.1%	626	16.6%	649	17.4%	665	18.0%	712	19.5%	Eliminated			
Latchmi Devi Gopal	165	4.3%	166	4.3%	166	4.4%	166	4.4%	170	4.5%	175	4.7%	184	5.0%	Eliminated					
Kenny G. Agosto	97	2.5%	98	2.6%	99	2.6%	101	2.7%	109	2.9%	113	3.0%	Eliminated							
Altagracia Soldevilla	99	2.6%	100	2.6%	104	2.7%	104	2.7%	107	2.8%	Eliminated									
Bernadette Ferrara	80	2.1%	81	2.1%	84	2.2%	89	2.3%	Eliminated											
Jose A. Padilla Jr.	71	1.9%	71	1.9%	78	2.0%	Eliminated													
Ariel Rivera-Diaz	45	1.2%	45	1.2%	Eliminated															
Undeclared Write-ins	12	0.3%	Eliminated																	
Inactive ballots	0 ballots		6 ballots		17 ballots		43 ballots		72 ballots		104 ballots		142 ballots		178 ballots		342 ballots		704 ballots	

==== Democratic primary ====
2021 New York City Council District 15 Democratic primary results
Party	Candidate	Maximum round	Maximum votes	Share in maximum round	Maximum votes First round votes Transfer votes
Democratic	Oswald Feliz	7	4,348	65.2%	
Democratic	Ischia Bravo	7	2,325	34.8%	
Democratic	Bernadette Ferrera	6	1,421	19.6%	
Democratic	John Sanchez	4	1,195	15.6%	
Democratic	Troy Blackwell	3	902	11.3%	
Democratic	Kenny Agosto	2	194	2.4%	
Democratic	Latchmi Gopal	2	194	2.4%	
Democratic	Lillithe Lozano	2	165	2.0%	
Write-in		1	31	0.2%	

==== Republican primary ====
2021 New York City Council District 15 Republican primary results
Party	Candidate	Maximum round	Maximum votes	Share in maximum round	Maximum votes First round votes Transfer votes
Republican	Ariel Rivera-Diaz	2	80	53.7%	
Republican	Aramis Ocasio	2	69	46.3%	
Write-in		1	15	9.4%	

Withdrawn

- Elisa Crespo
- Julian Sepulveda (endorsed Elisa Crespo)

==== Endorsements ====
Kenny Agosto

Organizations

- Stonewall Democratic Club of New York City
Ischia Bravo

State legislators

- Alessandra Biaggi, New York State Senator for the 34th district
- Catalina Cruz, New York State Assemblymember for the 39th district
- Nathalia Fernandez, New York State Assemblymember for the 80th district
- Jessica Ramos, New York State Senator for the 15th district

Local officials

- Diana Ayala, New York City Councilmember for the 8th district
- Rubén Díaz Jr., Borough President of the Bronx

Labor unions

- District Council 37
- New York City Central Labor Council
- New York State Nurses Association
- Retail, Wholesale and Department Store Union
- SEIU 32BJ
- United Federation of Teachers
Elisa Crespo (withdrew)

State legislators

- Harvey Epstein, New York State Assemblymember for the 74th district
- Jessica González-Rojas, New York Assemblymember for the 34th district
- Brad Hoylman, New York State Senator for the 27th district
- Julia Salazar, New York State Senator for the 18th district

Local officials

- Ben Kallos, New York City Councilmember for the 5th district
- Antonio Reynoso, New York City Councilmember for the 34th district

Individuals

- Melissa Mark-Viverito, former Speaker of the New York City Council

Labor unions

- 1199SEIU United Healthcare Workers East))(co-endorsed with Ischia Bravo)
- Communications Workers of America District 1

Organizations

- Jim Owles Liberal Democratic Club
- LGBTQ Victory Fund
- Make the Road Action
- New York Communities for Change
- Run for Something
- Stonewall Democratic Club of New York City (special election)
- Sunrise Movement – Bronx and Southern Westchester chapter
John Sanchez

Local officials

- Rafael Salamanca, New York City Councilmember for the 17th district

Organizations

- New York League of Conservation Voters

=== District 16 ===
The 16th district includes parts of the South Bronx, including parts of Melrose, parts of High Bridge, parts of Morris Heights, and Morrisania. Incumbent Democrat Vanessa Gibson was term-limited and could not run for a third consecutive term. She filed to run for Bronx Borough President.

==== Democratic primary ====
===== Candidates =====
- Abdourahamane Diallo, businessman
- Ahmadou Diallo, businessman
- Yves Filius, Democratic District Leader in the 77th assembly district
- Althea Stevens, activist

Withdrawn

- Leonardo Coello
- Uniqua Smith

===== Endorsements =====
Yves Filius

Local officials

- Fernando Cabrera, New York City Councilmember for the 14th district

Newspapers and publications

- New York Amsterdam News
Althea Stevens

Local officials

- Carlina Rivera, New York City Councilmember for the 2nd District

Labor unions

- United Federation of Teachers

Organizations

- EMILY's List
- New York League of Conservation Voters
- Our Revolution
- Run for Something
- Stonewall Democratic Club of New York City
- Working Families Party

===== Results =====
Democratic primary
Party	Candidate	Votes	%
Democratic	Althea Stevens	5,125	50.7
Democratic	Abdourahamane Diallo	2,075	20.5
Democratic	Ahmadou Diallo	2,046	20.2
Democratic	Yves Filius	795	7.9
Democratic	Write-ins	71	0.7
Total votes		10,112	100

=== District 17 ===
The 17th district includes parts of the South Bronx, including Port Morris, parts of Melrose, Hunts Point, Longwood, and parts of Soundview. Incumbent Democrat Rafael Salamanca was running for reelection.

==== Democratic primary ====
===== Candidates =====
- Helen Hines, former Chief of Staff to Andy King
- Rafael Salamanca, incumbent Councillor

Withdrawn

- Rafael Acevedo
- George Alvarez
- Lattina Brown
- Melody Jimenez
- Glennis Sanchez Severino

===== Results =====
Democratic primary
Party	Candidate	Votes	%
Democratic	Rafael Salamanca (incumbent)	5,428	60.0
Democratic	Helen Hines	3,539	39.1
Democratic	Write-ins	82	0.9
Total votes		9,042	100

===== Endorsements =====
Lattina Brown

Organizations

- Democracy for America
Rafael Salamanca

Federal legislators

- Ritchie Torres, U.S. Representative from New York's 15th congressional district

Labor unions

- Communications Workers of America District 1
- New York City Central Labor Council
- United Federation of Teachers

Organizations

- New York League of Conservation Voters
- Stonewall Democratic Club of New York City

=== District 18 ===
The 18th district covers parts of the Southeast Bronx, including Parkchester, Unionport, Castle Hill, Clason Point, and parts of Soundview. Incumbent Democrat Rubén Díaz Sr. was eligible to run for a second term, but chose to retire instead.

==== Democratic primary ====
2021 New York City Council District 18 Democratic primary results
Party	Candidate	Maximum round	Maximum votes	Share in maximum round	Maximum votes First round votes Transfer votes
Democratic	Amanda Farias	6	6,004	52.3%	
Democratic	William Rivera	6	5,467	47.7%	
Democratic	Michael Beltzer	5	2,079	16.2%	
Democratic	Darlene Jackson	5	1,964	15.3%	
Democratic	Mohammed Mujemder	4	1,768	13.1%	
Democratic	Mirza M. Rashid	3	732	5.3%	
Democratic	William Russell Moore	2	577	4.1%	
Democratic	Eliu A. Lara	2	136	1.0%	
Write-in		1	70	0.5%	

==== Green primary ====
Green primary
Party	Candidate	Votes	%
Green	Carl Lundgren		

==== Endorsements ====
Amanda Farías

Federal officials

- Alexandria Ocasio-Cortez, U.S. Representative for NY-14

Local officials

- Carlina Rivera, New York City Councilmember for the 2nd District

Labor unions

- 1199SEIU
- Communications Workers of America, District 1
- District Council 37
- New York City Central Labor Council
- Retail, Wholesale and Department Store Union
- SEIU 32BJ
- United Federation of Teachers

Organizations

- Jim Owles Liberal Democratic Club
- Make the Road Action
- New York League of Conservation Voters
- Our Revolution
- Run for Something
- Stonewall Democratic Club of New York City
- Sunrise Movement NYC
- Working Families Party
William Rivera

Local politicians

- Rubén Díaz Jr., Bronx Borough President
- Rubén Díaz Sr., New York City councillor

== Bronx/Queens crossover ==
=== District 22 ===
The 22nd district is currently vacant. The incumbent was Democrat Costa Constantinides, who was term-limited and could not run for a third consecutive term. He resigned to take a position as CEO of Variety Boys and Girls Club of Queens.

==== Democratic primary ====
===== Candidates =====
- Leonardo Bullaro, program director
- Tiffany Cabán, attorney and candidate for Queens District Attorney in 2019
- John Ciafone, landlord
- Catherine Gioino, journalist
- Evie Hantzopoulos, non-profit executive
- Nick Velkov, yoga instructor

Withdrawn

- Jamie-Faye Bean, non-profit executive
- Jesse Cerrotti, activist (endorsed Cabán)
- Nicholas Roloson, Chief of Staff to Costa Constantinides (endorsed Cabán)
- Rod Townsend, former president of the Stonewall Democratic Club of New York City (endorsed Cabán)

===== Endorsements =====
Tiffany Cabán

Federal legislators

- Alexandria Ocasio-Cortez, U.S. Representative for New York's 14th congressional district
- Bernie Sanders. U.S. Senator from Vermont

State legislators

- Jabari Brisport, New York State Senator for the 25th district
- Phara Souffrant Forrest, New York State Assemblymember for the 57th district
- Michael Gianaris, New York State Senator for the 12th district
- Jessica González-Rojas, New York State Assemblymember for the New York's 34th district
- Zohran Mamdani, New York State Assemblymember for the New York's 36th district
- Marcela Mitaynes, New York State Assemblymember for the 51st district
- Yuh-Line Niou, New York State Assemblymember
- Jessica Ramos, New York State Senator for the 13th district

Local officials

- Costa Constantinides, New York City Councilmember for the 22nd District
- Jimmy Van Bramer, New York City Councilmember for the 26th District

Individuals

- Cynthia Nixon, activist, actress, and former candidate for Governor of New York

Labor unions

- 1199SEIU United Healthcare Workers East
- Communications Workers of America, District 1
- District Council 37
- New York City Central Labor Council
- Professional Staff Congress, CUNY (first choice)
- Retail, Wholesale and Department Store Union
- SEIU 32BJ
- United Federation of Teachers

Organizations

- Democratic Socialists of America
- Jim Owles Liberal Democratic Club
- Make the Road Action
- New York League of Conservation Voters
- Our Revolution
- Run for Something
- Stonewall Democratic Club of New York City (first choice)
- Sunrise Movement NYC
- Working Families Party

Newspapers and publications

- The Indypendent (first choice)
John Ciafone

Labor unions

- Correction Officers' Benevolent Association
- Sergeants Benevolent Association
Evie Hantzopoulos

Organizations

- Professional Staff Congress, CUNY (second choice)
- Stonewall Democratic Club of New York City (second choice)

Newspapers and publications

- The Indypendent (second choice)

===== Results =====
2021 New York City Council District 22 Democratic primary results
Party	Candidate	Maximum round	Maximum votes	Share in maximum round	Maximum votes First round votes Transfer votes
Democratic	Tiffany Cabán	3	9,088	62.6%	
Democratic	Evie Hantzopoulos	3	5,424	37.4%	
Democratic	John Ciafone	2	1,622	10.0%	
Democratic	Leonardo Bullaro	2	1,221	7.5%	
Democratic	Catherine Gioino	2	804	5.0%	
Democratic	Nick Velkov	2	463	2.9%	
Write-in		1	30	0.2%	

==== Republican primary ====
- Felicia Kalan
Felicia Kalan

Organizations

- New York Young Republican Club

==== Green primary ====
- Edwin DeJesus

==== General election ====
General election
Party	Candidate	Votes	%
Democratic	Tiffany Cabán	11,650	63.0
Republican	Felicia Kalan	5,770	31.2
Green	Edwin DeJesus	1,172	5.9
Write-in		49	0.2
Total votes		18,553	100

== Queens ==
=== District 19 ===
In the 19th district, Democrat Paul Vallone was term-limited. Republican Vickie Paladino won a close race over Democrat Tony Avella.

==== Democratic primary ====
2021 New York City Council District 19 Democratic primary results
Party	Candidate	Maximum round	Maximum votes	Share in maximum round	Maximum votes First round votes Transfer votes
Democratic	Tony Avella	4	6,429	54.7%	
Democratic	Richard Lee	4	5,317	45.3%	
Democratic	Austin Shafran	3	2,939	23.2%	
Democratic	Adriana Aviles	2	1,058	8.1%	
Democratic	Francis Spangenberg	2	378	2.9%	
Democratic	Nabaraj Kc	2	186	1.4%	
Write-in		1	69	0.5%	

==== Republican primary ====
Republican primary
Party	Candidate	Votes	%
Republican	Vickie Paladino	1,765	52.6
Republican	John-Alexander Sakelos	1,608	47.0
Republican	Write-ins	47	1.4
Total votes		3,420	100

Conservative primary

Conservative primary
Party	Candidate	Votes	%
Conservative	John-Alexander Sakelos	107	88.4%
Conservative	Dawn Anatra	10	8.3%
Conservative	Write-ins	4	3.3%
Total votes		121	100

==== Endorsements ====
Richard Lee

Federal legislators

- Thomas Suozzi, U.S. Representative for New York's 3rd congressional district

Local officials

- Peter Koo, New York City Councilman for the 20th district

Organizations

- Stonewall Democratic Club of New York City (second choice)
Nabaraj KC

Local officials

- Fernando Cabrera, New York City Councilman for the 14th district
Austin Shafran

State legislators

- Daniel Rosenthal, New York State Assemblymember for the 27th district

Local officials

- Eric Adams, Brooklyn Borough President

Labor unions

- Communications Workers of America, District 1
- District Council 37
- New York City Central Labor Council
- SEIU 32BJ
- United Federation of Teachers

Organizations

- New York League of Conservation Voters
- Stonewall Democratic Club of New York City (first choice)
- Working Families Party

==== General election ====
General election
Party	Candidate	Votes	%
Republican	Vickie Paladino	12,325	45.4
Independent	Vickie Paladino	465	1.7
Total	Vickie Paladino	12,790	47.2
Democratic	Tony Avella	12,400	45.7
Conservative	John-Alexander Sakelos	1,641	6.1
Save Our City	John-Alexander Sakelos	216	0.7
Total	John-Alexander Sakelos	1,857	6.8
Write-in		71	0.3
Total votes		27,118	100

=== District 20 ===
In the 20th district, Democrat Peter Koo was term-limited and could not run for a fourth consecutive term.

==== Democratic primary ====
2021 New York City Council District 20 Democratic primary results
Party	Candidate	Maximum round	Maximum votes	Share in maximum round	Maximum votes First round votes Transfer votes
Democratic	Sandra Ung	8	4,205	55.2%	
Democratic	Ellen Young	8	3,406	44.8%	
Democratic	Neng Wang	7	2,146	25.2%	
Democratic	John Choe	6	1,845	20.2%	
Democratic	Anthony Miranda	5	1,550	15.9%	
Democratic	Hailing Chen	4	1,337	12.8%	
Democratic	Dao Yin	3	968	9.1%	
Democratic	Ming-Kang Low	2	50	0.5%	
Write-in		1	13	0.1%	

Withdrawn

- Isak Khaimov
- Sam Wong

==== Endorsements ====
John Choe

Local officials

- Jimmy Van Bramer, New York City Councilmember for the 26th District

Organizations

- 1199SEIU United Healthcare Workers East
- Make the Road Action
- Our Revolution
- Working Families Party
Anthony Miranda

Labor unions

- Correction Officers' Benevolent Association
Sandra Ung

Federal legislators

- Grace Meng, U.S. House of Representatives, member from New York's 6th congressional district

State legislators

- Catalina Cruz, New York State Assemblymember from the 39th district

Local officials

- Justin Brannan, New York City Councilmember for the 43rd District
- Costa Constantinides, New York City Councilmember for the 22nd District
- Peter Koo, New York City Councilmember for the 20th District
- Carlina Rivera, New York City Councilmember for the 2nd District

Labor unions

- Communications Workers of America, District 1
- District Council 37
- SEIU 32BJ
- International Brotherhood of Teamsters Local 831
- United Federation of Teachers

Organizations

- Lesbian and Gay Democratic Club of Queens
- New York League of Conservation Voters
- Stonewall Democratic Club of New York City

=== District 21 ===
In the 21st district, incumbent Francisco Moya was running for re-election.

==== Democratic primary ====
Democratic primary
Party	Candidate	Votes	%
Democratic	Francisco Moya (incumbent)	3,533	51.6
Democratic	Ingrid Gomez	1,248	18.2
Democratic	David Aiken	1,115	16.3
Democratic	George Onuorah	481	7.0
Democratic	Talea Wufka	438	6.4
Democratic	Write-ins	34	0.5
Total votes		6,849	100

Withdrawn

- Hiram Monserrate

==== Endorsements ====
Francisco Moya

Labor unions

- Communications Workers of America, District 1
- District Council 37
- SEIU 32BJ
- United Federation of Teachers

Organizations

- New York League of Conservation Voters
- Stonewall Democratic Club of New York City
George Onuorah

Newspapers and publications

- New York Amsterdam News

=== District 23 ===
In the 23rd district, incumbent Democrat Barry Grodenchik was eligible to run for a second term, but chose to retire instead.

==== Democratic primary ====
2021 New York City Council District 23 Democratic primary results
Party	Candidate	Maximum round	Maximum votes	Share in maximum round	Maximum votes First round votes Transfer votes
Democratic	Linda Lee	5	7,173	54.5%	
Democratic	Jaslin Kaur	5	5,992	45.5%	
Democratic	Steve Behar	4	2,427	15.9%	
Democratic	Debra Markell	4	2,300	15.1%	
Democratic	Sanjeev Jindal	3	2,009	12.5%	
Democratic	Koshy Thomas	2	788	4.8%	
Democratic	Harpreet Toor	2	688	4.2%	
Write-in		1	57	0.3%	

==== Republican primary ====
Republican primary
Party	Candidate	Votes	%
Republican	James Reilly	1,040	66.5
Republican	Alex Amoroso	461	29.5
Republican	Write-ins	63	4.0
Total votes		1,564	100

Withdrawn

- Seth Breland (endorsed Linda Lee)
- Janet Dennis
- Christopher Fuentes-Padilla
- Mandeep Sahi

==== Endorsements ====
Steve Behar

Local officials

- Barry Grodenchik, New York City Councilmember for the 23rd District
James Reilly

Organizations

- New York Young Republican Club
Linda Lee

State legislators

- Catalina Cruz, New York State Assemblymember for the 39th district
- Nily Rozic, New York State Assemblymember for the 25th district

Labor unions

- United Federation of Teachers

Organizations

- New York League of Conservation Voters
- Stonewall Democratic Club of New York City
Jaslin Kaur

Federal legislators

- Alexandria Ocasio-Cortez, United States Representative for New York's 14th congressional district (2019–present)
- Bernie Sanders. US Senator from Vermont (2007–present)

State legislators

- Jabari Brisport, New York State Senator for the 25th district
- Phara Souffrant Forrest, New York State Assemblymember for the 57th district
- Michael Gianaris, New York State Senator for the 12th district
- Jessica González-Rojas, New York State Assemblymember for the 34th district
- Zohran Mamdani, New York State Assemblymember for the 36th district
- Marcela Mitaynes, New York State Assemblymember for the 51st district

Individuals

- Cynthia Nixon, activist, actress, and former candidate for Governor of New York

Labor unions

- 1199SEIU United Healthcare Workers East
- Communications Workers of America District 1
- Professional Staff Congress, CUNY

Organizations

- Citizen Action of New York
- Democratic Socialists of America
- New York City Democratic Socialists of America
- New York Communities for Change
- Our Revolution
- Run for Something
- Sunrise Movement New York City
- Working Families Party
Debra Markell

Federal legislators

- Thomas Suozzi, U.S. Representative for New York's 3rd congressional district

State legislators

- Chuck Lavine, New York State Assemblymember for the 13th district
- Catherine Nolan, New York State Assemblymember for the 37th district

Local officials

- Robert Holden, New York City Councilmember for the 30th District
- Josh Lafazan, Nassau County Legislator for the 18th District

=== District 24 ===
In the 24th district. incumbent was Democrat Rory Lancman, who resigned his seat on November 2, 2020. A special election was held on February 2, 2021, with James F. Gennaro winning and being eligible to run for a full term.

==== Special election ====
Special election
Party	Candidate	Votes	%
Queens Strong	James F. Gennaro	4,078	60.12%
Mo for the People	Moumita Ahmed	1,041	15.35%
Soma for Queens	Soma Syed	537	7.92%
A Better Queens	Deepti Sharma	322	4.89%
Your Voice Matters	Dilip Nath	283	4.17%
Community First	Neeta Jain	227	3.35%
Unity	Mujib Rahman	192	2.83%
United Citizens	Michael Earl Brown	96	1.42%
	Write-ins	7	0.1%
Total votes		6,783	100

Percentages may be slightly different from 100% due to rounding.

==== Democratic primary ====
Democratic primary
Party	Candidate	Votes	%
Democratic	James F. Gennaro (incumbent)	8,062	60.1
Democratic	Moumita Ahmed	3,020	22.5
Democratic	Saifur Khan	1,147	8.6
Democratic	Mohammed Uddin	1,123	8.4
Democratic	Write-ins	56	0.4
Total votes		13,048	100

==== Republican primary ====
Republican primary
Party	Candidate	Votes	%
Republican	Tim Rosen	478	59.2
Republican	Angelo King	292	36.2
Republican	Write-ins	37	4.6
Total votes		807	100

Withdrawn

- Stanley Arden
- Joshua Maynard

==== Endorsements ====
Moumita Ahmed

Federal legislators

- Bernie Sanders, Senator for Vermont

Individuals

- Cynthia Nixon, actress, former candidate for Governor of New York in 2018

Organizations

- New York Communities for Change
- Our Revolution
- Run for Something
- Stonewall Democratic Club of New York City (second choice)
- Working Families Party

Newspapers and publications

- The Indypendent
James Gennaro

State legislators

- Joseph Addabbo Jr., New York State Senator for the 15th district

Labor unions

- International Brotherhood of Electrical Workers, Local No. 3
- United Federation of Teachers

Individuals

- Gary Ackerman, former U.S. Representative for New York's 5th congressional district

Organizations

- New York League of Conservation Voters
- Stonewall Democratic Club of New York City (first choice)

=== District 25 ===
In the 25th district, incumbent Democrat Danny Dromm was term-limited and could not run for a fourth consecutive term.

==== Democratic primary ====
===== Candidates =====
- Fatima Baryab, non-profit executive
- Yi Chen, activist and NYPD auxiliary
- Shekar Krishnan, civil rights lawyer
- Liliana Melo, District Leader for the 34th State Assembly district
- Manuel Perez, interpreter and life coach
- Alfonso Quiroz, vice-president of the JFK Democratic Club
- William Salgado, attorney and District Leader for the 39th State Assembly district
- Carolyn Tran, former chief of staff to Danny Dromm

Withdrawn

- Lucy Cerezo Scully

===== Endorsements =====
Shekar Krishnan

Federal legislators

- Nydia Velázquez, U.S. Representative from New York's 7th congressional district

State legislators

- Catalina Cruz, New York State Assemblymember for the 39th district
- Emily Gallagher, New York State Assemblymember for the 50th district
- John Liu, New York State Senator for the 11th district
- Julia Salazar, New York State Senator for the 18th district

Local officials

- Justin Brannan, New York City Councilmember for the 43rd district
- Costa Constantinides, former New York City Councilman from the 22nd Council District
- Daniel Dromm, New York City Councilman from the 25th Council District
- Carlina Rivera, New York City Councilmember for the 2nd district

Labor unions

- 1199SEIU United Healthcare Workers East (ranked first)
- Communications Workers of America, District 1
- District Council 37
- New York City Central Labor Council
- Professional Staff Congress (first choice)
- SEIU 32BJ
- United Federation of Teachers

Organizations

- Jim Owles Liberal Democratic Club
- Make the Road Action
- New York League of Conservation Voters
- Run for Something
- Stonewall Democratic Club of New York City (third choice)
Alfonso Quiroz

Organizations

- Stonewall Democratic Club of New York City (first choice)
Carolyn Tran

State legislators

- Jessica Ramos, New York State Senator for the 13th district

Labor unions

- Professional Staff Congress (second choice)

Organizations

- Stonewall Democratic Club of New York City (second choice)

===== Results =====
2021 New York City Council District 25 Democratic primary results
Party	Candidate	Maximum round	Maximum votes	Share in maximum round	Maximum votes First round votes Transfer votes
Democratic	Shekar Krishnan	7	6,352	53.4%	
Democratic	Yi Chen	7	5,549	46.6%	
Democratic	Carolyn Tran	6	3,045	23.6%	
Democratic	Alfonso Quiroz	5	1,986	14.5%	
Democratic	Fatima Baryab	4	1,687	11.8%	
Democratic	Liliana Melo	3	1,041	7.1%	
Democratic	Manuel Perez	2	513	3.4%	
Democratic	William Salgado	2	282	1.9%	
Write-in		1	35	0.2%	

==== Libertarian primary ====
- Suraj Jaswal, director of operations

==== General election ====
General election
Party	Candidate	Votes	%
Democratic	Shekar Krishnan	9,466	61.1
Republican	Shah Shahidul Haque	2,987	19.3
Independent	Fatima Baryab	2,555	16.5
Libertarian	Suraj Jaswal	415	2.7
Write-in		62	0.4
Total votes		15,485	100

=== District 26 ===
In the 26th district, incumbent Democrat Jimmy Van Bramer was term-limited and could not run for a fourth consecutive term. He filed to run for Queens Borough President.

==== Democratic primary ====
===== Candidates =====
- Amit Bagga, former deputy director of the New York City Census
- Jonathan Bailey, former chairman of the Queens Democratic Socialists of America
- Lorenzo Brea, activist
- Julia Forman, former prosecutor
- Glennis Gomez, political staffer
- Denise Keehan-Smith, former chairperson of Queens Community Board 2
- Badrun Khan, financial manager; candidate for NY-14 in 2020
- Hailie Kim, adjunct professor at Hunter College
- Jesse Laymon, political strategist
- Sultan al Maruf, IT director
- Brent O'Leary, legal consultant
- Steven Raga, former Chief of Staff to Brian Barnwell
- Emily Sharpe, attorney
- Julie Won, member of Queens Community Board 2
- Ebony Young, non-profit executive

Withdrawn

- Tavo Bortoli
- Giselle Burgess
- Benjamin Guttmann
- Bianca Ozeri
- Micah Peterson
- Alexander Rias

===== Endorsements =====
Amit Bagga

State legislators

- Jessica Ramos, New York State Senator for the 13th district

Local officials

- Jimmy Van Bramer, NYC Councillor

Individuals

- Cynthia Nixon, actress, former candidate for Governor of New York

Labor unions

- 1199SEIU United Healthcare Workers East (ranked first)
- Professional Staff Congress (first choice)

Organizations

- Citizens Union (second choice)
- Make the Road Action (first choice)
- New York Communities for Change
- New York League of Conservation Voters
- Run for Something
- Stonewall Democratic Club of New York City (first choice)
- Working Families Party (first choice)
Julia Forman

Labor unions

- United Federation of Teachers

Organizations

- Run for Something
Hailie Kim

State legislators

- James Sanders Jr., New York State Senator for the 10th district

Local officials

- Carlos Menchaca, New York City Councilman for the 38th district
Jesse Laymon

Organizations

- Working Families Party (second choice)
Brent O'Leary

Organizations

- Citizens Union (third choice)
- Stonewall Democratic Club of New York City (second choice)
Julie Won

State legislators

- Ron Kim, New York State Assemblyman for the 40th district
- John Liu, New York State Senator for the 13th district

Labor unions

- Professional Staff Congress (second choice)

Organizations

- Citizens Union (first choice)
- Jim Owles Liberal Democratic Club

===== Results =====
2021 New York City Council District 26 Democratic primary results
Party	Candidate	Maximum round	Maximum votes	Share in maximum round	Maximum votes First round votes Transfer votes
Democratic	Julie Won	15	6,822	56.7%	
Democratic	Amit Bagga	15	5,211	43.3%	
Democratic	Brent O'Leary	14	3,150	22.7%	
Democratic	Julia Forman	13	2,705	17.9%	
Democratic	Ebony Young	12	1,807	11.4%	
Democratic	Denise Keehan-Smith	11	1,533	9.4%	
Democratic	Badrun Khan	10	1,340	8.0%	
Democratic	Hailie Kim	9	1,166	6.9%	
Democratic	Jonathan Bailey	8	1,002	5.8%	
Democratic	Glennis Gomez	7	733	4.2%	
Democratic	Emily Sharpe	6	679	3.9%	
Democratic	Jesse Laymon	5	609	3.5%	
Democratic	Steven Raga	4	570	3.2%	
Democratic	Lorenzo Brea	3	368	2.0%	
Democratic	Sultan Al Maruf	2	295	1.6%	
Write-in		1	46	0.3%	

==== General election ====
General election
Party	Candidate	Votes	%
Democratic	Julie Won	14,123	77.2
Republican	Marvin Jeffcoat	4,161	22.8
Write-in			
Total votes			100

==== Republican primary ====
- Marvin Jeffcoat, veteran

=== District 27 ===
In the 27th district, incumbent Democrat Daneek Miller was term-limited and could not run for a third consecutive term.

==== Democratic primary ====
2021 New York City Council District 27 Democratic primary results
Party	Candidate	Maximum round	Maximum votes	Share in maximum round	Maximum votes First round votes Transfer votes
Democratic	Nantasha Williams	13	11,810	72.9%	
Democratic	James Johnson	13	4,387	27.1%	
Democratic	Rene Hill	12	3,391	19.3%	
Democratic	Jason Myles Clark	11	2,257	12.4%	
Democratic	Al-Hassan Kanu	9	2,008	10.6%	
Democratic	Marie Adam-Ovide	8	1,851	9.5%	
Democratic	Kerryane Burke	7	1,318	6.7%	
Democratic	Harold Miller	6	1,205	6.0%	
Democratic	Anthony Rivers	5	715	3.6%	
Democratic	Leroy Gadsden	4	451	2.2%	
Democratic	Jermaine Smith	3	423	2.1%	
Democratic	Linda Guillebeaux	2	200	1.0%	
Write-in		1	42	0.2%	

Withdrawn

- Timothy Turane

==== Endorsements ====
Nantasha Williams

Labor unions

- Professional Staff Congress
- United Federation of Teachers

Organizations

- New York League of Conservation Voters
- Run for Something
- Stonewall Democratic Club of New York City (second choice)
Harold Miller

Organizations

- New York Communities for Change
- Our Revolution
- Stonewall Democratic Club of New York City (first choice)
- Working Families Party

Newspapers and publications

- New York Amsterdam News

=== District 28 ===
In the 28th district, incumbent Democrat Adrienne Adams was running for re-election.

==== Democratic primary ====
Democratic primary
Party	Candidate	Votes	%
Democratic	Adrienne Adams (incumbent)	7,490	53.4
Democratic	Japneet Singh	3,379	24.1
Democratic	Ruben Wills	3,105	22.1
Democratic	Write-ins	61	0.4
Total votes		14,035	100

Withdrawn

- Martin Hightower

==== Endorsements ====
Adrienne Adams

Labor unions

- Correction Officers' Benevolent Association
- United Federation of Teachers

Organizations

- EMILY's List
- Stonewall Democratic Club of New York City

=== District 29 ===
In the 29th district, incumbent Democrat Karen Koslowitz was term-limited and could not run for a fourth consecutive term. She had already served five terms on the NYC Council, but non-consecutively.

==== Democratic primary ====
2021 New York City Council District 29 Democratic primary results
Party	Candidate	Maximum round	Maximum votes	Share in maximum round	Maximum votes First round votes Transfer votes
Democratic	Lynn Schulman	8	7,232	60.0%	
Democratic	Aleda Gagarin	8	4,825	40.0%	
Democratic	David Aronov	7	4,135	28.8%	
Democratic	Donghui Zang	6	3,012	19.2%	
Democratic	Avi Cyperstein	5	2,183	13.4%	
Democratic	Edwin Wong	4	1,541	9.3%	
Democratic	Douglas Shapiro	3	1,366	8.1%	
Democratic	Eliseo Dorion Labayen	2	692	4.0%	
Democratic	Sheryl Ann Fetik	2	487	2.8%	
Write-in		1	41	0.2%	

==== Endorsements ====
David Aronov

Organizations

- American Institute of Architects
Avi Cyperstein

Labor unions

- Correction Officers' Benevolent Association

Newspapers and publications

- The Jewish Press
Aleda Gagarin

State legislators

- Ron Kim, New York State Assemblymember for the 40th district

Organizations

- New York Communities for Change
- Our Revolution
- Run for Something
- Sunrise Movement NYC
- Working Families Party
Lynn Schulman

Federal legislators

- Grace Meng, U.S. House of Representatives, New York's 6th congressional district,

Local officials

- Karen Koslowitz, New York City Councilmember for the 29th District
- Carlina Rivera, New York City Councilmember for the 2nd District

Labor unions

- Communications Workers of America, District 1
- District Council 37
- New York City Central Labor Council
- SEIU 32BJ
- Uniformed Firefighters Association
- United Federation of Teachers

Organizations

- Jim Owles Liberal Democratic Club
- LGBTQ Victory Fund
- New York League of Conservation Voters
- Stonewall Democratic Club of New York City

=== District 30 ===
In the 30th district, incumbent Democrat Robert Holden was running for re-election.

==== Democratic primary ====
===== Endorsements =====
Juan Ardila

State legislators

- Michael Gianaris, New York State Senate member for the 12th district
- Jessica Ramos, New York State Senate member for the 13th district

Local officials

- Brad Lander, New York City Councilman from the 39th district, candidate for New York City Comptroller

Labor unions

- 1199 SEIU

Organizations

- Make the Road Action
- Our Revolution
- Run for Something
- Stonewall Democratic Club of New York City
- Working Families Party
Robert Holden

Labor unions

- Correction Officers' Benevolent Association
- New York City Central Labor Council
- United Federation of Teachers

Democratic primary
Party	Candidate	Votes	%
Democratic	Robert Holden (incumbent)	5,250	54.6
Democratic	Juan Ardila	4,324	45.0
Democratic	Write-ins	38	0.4
Total votes		9,612	100

==== General election ====
General election
Party	Candidate	Votes	%
Democratic	Robert Holden		
Republican	Robert Holden		
Conservative	Robert Holden		
Save Our City	Robert Holden		
Total	Robert Holden		
Write-in			
Total votes			100

=== District 31 ===
The 31st district is currently filled by Selvena Brooks-Powers, who will hold it for the remainder of the current term. The previous incumbent was Democrat Donovan Richards and was term-limited, preventing him from seeking a third consecutive term. He was elected Queens Borough President in 2020 and resigned his seat to assume that office on December 2, 2020. A special election was held on February 23, 2021, with the winner serving out Richard's term, which runs until the end of 2021 and being eligible to run for a full term in 2021.

The election was New York City's first ranked choice voting election with multiple rounds, and Selvena N. Brooks-Powers remained in the lead throughout all nine rounds.

==== Special election ====
2021 NYC special election, 31st District

NYC special election 31st Council District
Candidate	Round 1		Round 2		Round 3		Round 4		Round 5		Round 6		Round 7		Round 8		Round 9	
Candidate	Votes	%	Votes	%	Votes	%	Votes	%	Votes	%	Votes	%	Votes	%	Votes	%	Votes	%
Selvena Brooks-Powers	2834	38.5%	2837	38.6%	2847	38.8%	2880	39.3%	2915	40.1%	2970	41.2%	3107	43.6%	3360	48.2%	3841	59.0%
Pesach Osina	2488	33.8%	2489	33.8%	2491	34.0%	2494	34.1%	2509	34.5%	2519	35.0%	2526	35.5%	2556	36.6%	2674	41.0%
Manny Silva	739	10.0%	739	10.0%	743	10.1%	764	10.4%	800	11.0%	844	11.7%	916	12.9%	1059	15.2%	Eliminated	
Latoya R. Benjamin	385	5.2%	386	5.2%	394	5.4%	427	5.8%	451	6.2%	484	6.7%	570	8.0%	Eliminated			
Sherwyn James	334	4.5%	335	4.6%	346	4.7%	353	4.8%	366	5.0%	386	5.4%	Eliminated					
Shawn M. Rux	214	2.9%	214	2.9%	218	3.0%	224	3.1%	234	3.2%	Eliminated							
Nancy J. Martinez	168	2.3%	168	2.3%	175	2.4%	181	2.5%	Eliminated									
Latanya Collins	108	1.5%	109	1.5%	120	1.6%	Eliminated											
Nicole S. Lee	69	0.9%	77	1.0%	Eliminated													
Undeclared Write-ins	24	0.3%	Eliminated															
Inactive ballots	0 ballots		9 ballots		29 ballots		40 ballots		88 ballots		160 ballots		244 ballots		388 ballots		848 ballots	

==== Democratic primary ====
Democratic primary
Party	Candidate	Votes	%
Democratic	Selvena Brooks-Powers (incumbent)	10,807	67.4%
Democratic	Nancy Martinez	3,049	19.0%
Democratic	Nicole Lee	2,039	12.7%
Democratic	Write-ins	136	0.86%
Total votes		16,031	100

Withdrawn

- Monique Charlton
- Franck Joseph

==== Endorsements ====
Selvena N. Brooks-Powers

Federal legislators

- Gregory Meeks, U.S. Representative from New York's 5th congressional district

State legislators

- Alicia Hyndman, New York State Assemblymember for the 29th district
- James Sanders Jr., New York State Senator for the 31st district

Local officials

- Donovan Richards, Queens Borough President

Labor unions

- Communications Workers of America, District 1
- District Council 37, Hotel Trades Council, New York State Nurses Association
- New York City Central Labor Council
- SEIU 32BJ
- United Federation of Teachers

Organizations

- EMILY's List
- New York League of Conservation Voters
- Run for Something
- Stonewall Democratic Club of New York City

Newspapers and publications

- New York Amsterdam News

=== District 32 ===
In the 32nd district, incumbent Republican Eric Ulrich was term-limited and could not run for a fourth consecutive term.

==== Republican primary ====
===== Candidates =====
- Joann Ariola, chair of the Queens Republican Party
- Stephen Sirgiovanni, businessman

===== Results =====
Republican primary
Party	Candidate	Votes	%
Republican	Joann Ariola	2,378	82.0
Republican	Stephen Sirgiovanni	494	17.0
Republican	Write-ins	28	1.0
Total votes		2,900	100

==== Democratic primary ====
===== Candidates =====
- Kaled Alamarie, city planner
- Bella Matias, non-profit executive
- Michael Scala, attorney
- Shaeleigh Severino, paralegal
- Helal Sheikh, former educator
- Felicia Singh, educator

Withdrawn

- Joel Gokool, consultant
- Raimondo Graziano, activist

===== Endorsements =====
Michael Scala

State legislators

- James Sanders Jr., New York State Senator for the 10th district

Individuals

- Michael Miller, former New York State Assemblymember for the 38th district

Labor unions

- Laborers' International Union of North America
- Uniformed Fire Officers Association
- United Federation of Teachers

Organizations

- American Council of Engineering Companies of New York
- New York League of Conservation Voters
Shaeleigh Severino

Organizations

- Run for Something
Felicia Singh

State officials

- Jessica Ramos, state senator

Labor unions

- Communications Workers of America, District 1
- District Council 37
- SEIU 32BJ

Organizations

- Citizen Action of New York
- New York Communities for Change
- Our Revolution
- Run for Something
- Stonewall Democratic Club of New York City
- Sunrise Movement NYC
- Working Families Party

===== Results =====
2021 New York City Council District 32 Democratic primary results
Party	Candidate	Maximum round	Maximum votes	Share in maximum round	Maximum votes First round votes Transfer votes
Democratic	Felicia Singh	3	4,686	52.5%	
Democratic	Michael Scala	3	4,248	47.5%	
Democratic	Helal Shiekh	2	1,100	10.8%	
Democratic	Bella Matias	2	817	8.0%	
Democratic	Kaled Alamarie	2	702	6.9%	
Democratic	Shaeleigh Severino	2	261	2.6%	
Write-in		1	163	1.6%	

==== General election ====
===== Candidates =====
- Joann Ariola (Republican), chair of the Queens Republican Party
- Felicia Singh (Democratic), educator
- Kenichi Wilson (Community First), chair of Queens Community Board 9

===== Post-primary endorsements =====
Joann Ariola

U.S. Representatives

- Nicole Malliotakis, US Representative from New York's 11th congressional district (2021–present), former NY State Assemblymember for the 64th district (2013–2020) and the 60th district (2011–2012), and nominee for mayor in 2017

State legislators

- Phil Goldfeder, former Member of the New York State Assembly from the 23rd district (Democratic)

Local officials

- Augustus Agate, former New York Supreme Court 11th Judicial District (Democratic)
- Joe Fox, former Chief of Transit for the NYPD
- Romeo Hitlall, President of the Richmond Hill-South Ozone Park Lions Club (Democratic)
- Robert Holden, Member of the New York City Council from the 30th district (Democratic)
- Danny Ruscillo, NYPD Community Partner for the 100th Precinct
- Eric Ulrich, Member of the New York City Council from the 32nd district

Labor unions

- Correction Officers' Benevolent Association
- Detectives' Endowment Association
- International Union of Operating Engineers
- LIUNA NY
- Lieutenants Benevolent Association
- New York State Court Officers' Association
- New York State Supreme Court Officers' Association
- N.Y.C. District Council of Carpenters

- Plumbers - Local 1
- Police Benevolent Association
- Sergeants Benevolent Association
- Steamfitters - Local 638
- Teamsters Local 814
- Uniformed Firefighters Association
- Uniformed Sanitationmen's Association - Local 831

Individuals

- Patrick Lynch, President of the Police Benevolent Association

Organizations

- Sant Baba Prem Singh Sikh Cultural Society of New York

Newspapers

- Leader–Observer
- New York Daily News
- New York Post
- Queens Chronicle
- The Wave
Felicia Singh

U.S. Senators

- Kirsten Gillibrand, U.S. Senator from New York
- Chuck Schumer, Senate Majority Leader and U.S. Senator from New York

U.S. Representatives

- Alexandria Ocasio-Cortez, Member of the U.S. House of Representatives from New York's 14th district

State officials

- Kathy Hochul, 57th Governor of New York
- Letitia James, Attorney General of New York

State legislators

- Khaleel Anderson, Member of the New York State Assembly from the 31st district
- Catalina Cruz, Member of the New York State Assembly from the 39th district
- Andrew Hevesi, Member of the New York State Assembly from the 28th district

Local officials

- Ravinder Bhalla, mayor of Hoboken, New Jersey, and New Jersey's first Sikh mayor
- Selvena Brooks-Powers, New York City Councilmember from the 31st district
- Costa Constantinides, former NYC councilman from the 22nd district
- Donovan Richards, Queens Borough President
- Jumaane Williams, New York City Public Advocate

Organizations

- Courage to Change
- The Jewish Vote

Individuals

- Zephyr Teachout, attorney and political candidate

Newspapers

- Queens Ledger

===== Results =====
General election
Party	Candidate	Votes	%
Republican	Joann Ariola	15,216	59.5
Conservative	Joann Ariola	1,694	6.6
Total	Joann Ariola	16,910	66.2
Democratic	Felicia Singh	8,322	36.5
Community First	Kenichi Wilson	283	1.1
Write-in		40	0.2
Total votes		25,555	100

== Queens/Brooklyn crossover ==
=== District 34 ===
In the 34th district, incumbent Democrat Antonio Reynoso was term-limited and could not run for a third consecutive term. He filed to run for Brooklyn Borough President.

==== Democratic primary ====
===== Candidates =====
- Lutchi Gayot, businesswoman
- Jennifer Gutiérrez, Chief of Staff to Antonio Reynoso
- Andy Marte, former campaign manager for Vito J. Lopez
- Scott Murphy, former advertiser

Withdrawn

- Terrell Finner
- Danny Marin

===== Results =====
Democratic primary
Party	Candidate	Votes	%
Democratic	Jennifer Gutiérrez	13,065	79.5
Democratic	Scott Murphy	1,406	8.6
Democratic	Andy Marte	1,263	7.6
Democratic	Lutchi Gayot	630	3.8
Democratic	Write-ins	74	0.5
Total votes		14,652	100

==== General election ====
General election
Party	Candidate	Votes	%
Democratic	Jennifer Gutiérrez	12,799	90.2%
BLK Lives matter	Lutchi Gayot	655	4.6%
Power 2 the People	Terrell Lynn Finner	642	4.5%
Write-in		79	0.5%
Total votes		14,175	100%

==== Endorsements ====
Jennifer Gutiérrez

Federal legislators

- Alexandria Ocasio-Cortez, U.S. Representative for New York's 14th congressional district (2019–present)
- Nydia Velázquez, U.S. Representative for New York's 7th congressional district

Local officials

- Carlina Rivera, New York City Councilmember for the 2nd District

Labor unions

- Communications Workers of America, District 1
- District Council 37
- New York City Central Labor Council
- SEIU 32BJ
- United Federation of Teachers

Organizations

- EMILY's List
- New York League of Conservation Voters
- Our Revolution
- Run for Something
- Stonewall Democratic Club of New York City
- Working Families Party

== Staten Island ==
=== District 49 ===
In the 49th district, incumbent Democrat Debi Rose was term-limited and could not run for a fourth consecutive term.

==== Democratic primary ====
2021 New York City Council District 49 Democratic primary results
Party	Candidate	Maximum round	Maximum votes	Share in maximum round	Maximum votes First round votes Transfer votes
Democratic	Kamillah Hanks	9	5,996	56.9%	
Democratic	Amoy Barnes	9	4,536	43.1%	
Democratic	Morounranti Ogunleye	8	2,329	20.4%	
Democratic	Kelvin Richards	7	1,929	15.8%	
Democratic	Selina Grey	6	1,657	13.1%	
Democratic	David Hernandez	5	1,190	9.1%	
Democratic	Michael Schnall	4	1,014	7.6%	
Democratic	Troy McGhie	3	869	6.4%	
Democratic	John McBeth Sr.	2	394	2.9%	
Write-in		1	53	0.4%	

Withdrawn

- Philippe-Edner Apostol-Marius
- Vincent Johnson
- Aidan Rivera

==== Endorsements ====
Amoy Barnes

Labor unions

- United Federation of Teachers

Organizations

- Stonewall Democratic Club of New York City (first choice)
- Run for Something
- Working Families Party
Selina Grey

Organizations

- New York League of Conservation Voters
Kelvin Richards

Newspapers and publications

- New York Amsterdam News
Michael Schnall

Organizations

- Stonewall Democratic Club of New York City (second choice)

==== Republican primary ====
Republican primary
Party	Candidate	Votes	%
Republican	Write-ins		
Total votes			100

Withdrawn

- Nicholas Robbins

=== District 50 ===
2021 New York City's 50th City Council district election
- November 2, 2021
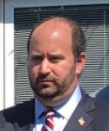

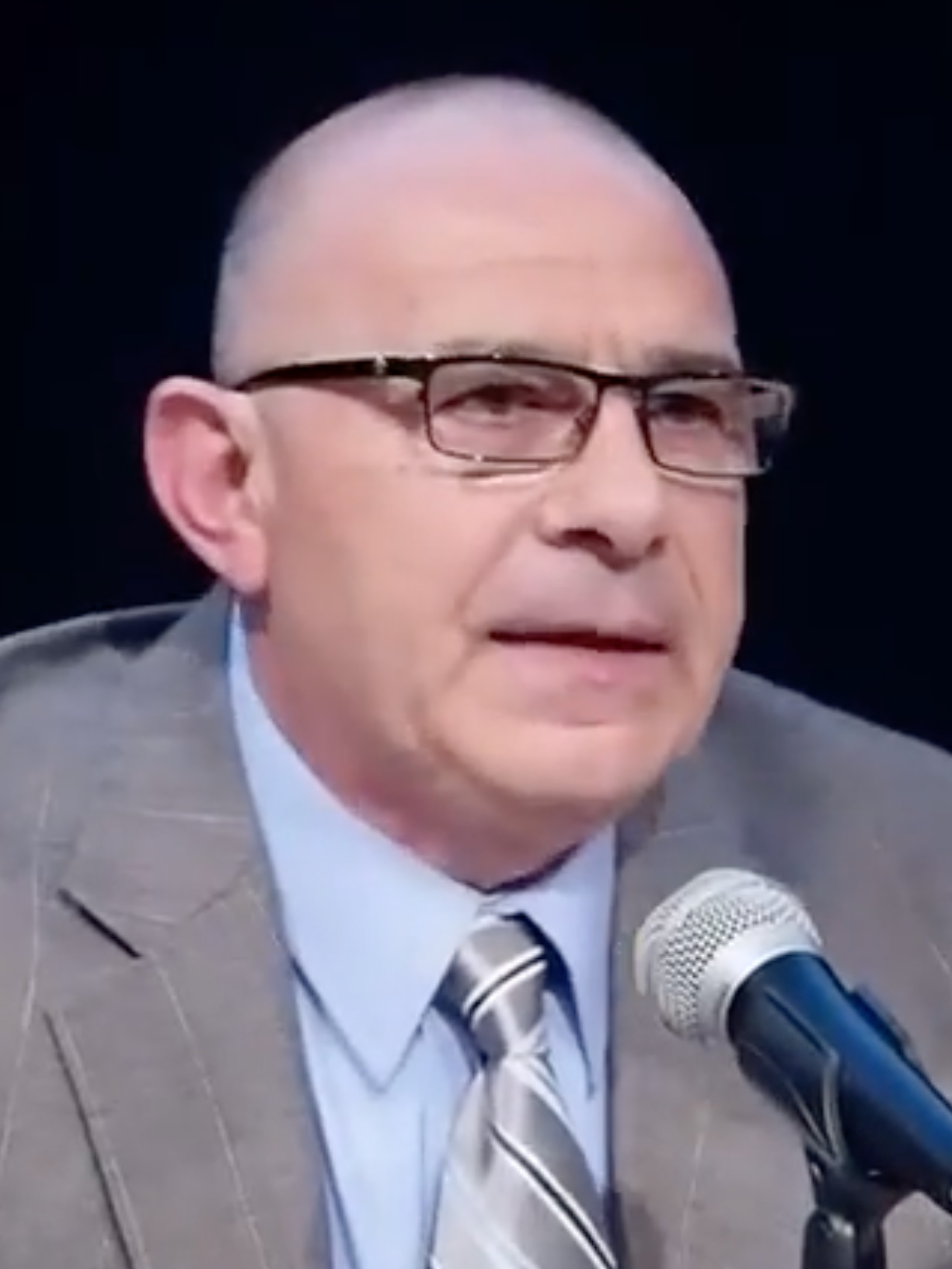

	Majority party	Minority party	Third party
Candidate	David Carr	Sal Albanese	George S. Wonica
Party	Republican	Democratic	Conservative
Popular vote	20,485	10,620	2,370
Percentage	61.1%	31.6%	6.67%
Councilmember before election
Steven Matteo
Republican
Elected Councilmember
David Carr
Republican

In the 50th district, incumbent Republican Steven Matteo was term-limited and could not run for a third consecutive term. He filed to run for Staten Island Borough President, but lost the Republican primary to Vito Fossella. The district was won by David Carr, Matteo's chief of staff.

==== Republican primary ====
===== Candidates =====
- David Carr, Chief of Staff to Steven Matteo
- Jordan Hafizi, former journalist
- Marko Kepi, Marine reservist and activist
- Sam Pirozollo, optician
- Kathleen Sforza, businesswoman

===== Campaign =====
The two frontrunners for the open council seat were David Carr, chief of staff to outgoing councilman Matteo, and Marko Kepi, a Marine reservist who had previously lost in a campaign for the New York State Assembly. The race became contentious as results were tabulated, with Carr accusing Kepi of engaging in an illegal ballot harvesting operation and forging signatures on absentee ballots. In response, Kepi accused Carr of using his influence to get the New York City Board of Elections to systematically reject ballots cast by the Albanian-American community.

===== Endorsements =====
David Carr

Federal officials

- Nicole Malliotakis, U.S. Representative from NY-11
Marko Kepi

State officials

- Marty Golden, former State Senator

Newspapers and publications

- The Jewish Press (primary only)

===== Results =====
2021 New York City Council District 50 Republican primary results
Party	Candidate	Maximum round	Maximum votes	Share in maximum round	Maximum votes First round votes Transfer votes
Republican	David Carr	5	3,625	50.3%	
Republican	Marko Kepi	5	3,581	49.7%	
Republican	Sam Pirozzolo	4	2,172	26.5%	
Republican	Kathleen Sforza	3	618	7.3%	
Republican	Jordan Hafizi	2	414	4.8%	
Write-in		1	43	0.5%	

==== Democratic primary ====
===== Candidates =====
- Sal Albanese, former councilman and perennial candidate

==== General election ====
General election
Party	Candidate	Votes	%
Republican	David Carr	20,485	61.1%
Democratic	Sal Albanese	9,575	28.5%
Staten Island 1st	Sal Albanese	1,045	3.1%
Total	Sal Albanese	10,620	31.6%
Conservative	George S. Wonica	2,370	6.67%
Write-in		44	0.1%
Total votes		35,519	100

=== District 51 ===
2021 New York City's 51st City Council district election
- November 2, 2021
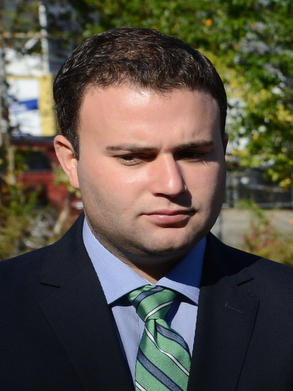

	Majority party	Minority party
Candidate	Joe Borelli	Olivia Drabczyk
Party	Republican	Democratic
Alliance	Conservative
Popular vote	33,166	5,852
Percentage	84.95%	14.99
Councilmember before election
Joe Borelli
Republican
Elected Councilmember
Joe Borelli
Republican

In the 51st district, incumbent Republican Joe Borelli ran for re-election and was re-elected over Olivia Drabczyk.

==== Republican primary ====
===== Candidates =====
- Joe Borelli, incumbent Councilman

==== Democratic primary ====
===== Candidates =====
- Olivia Drabczyk, teacher

==== General election ====
General election
Party	Candidate	Votes	%
Republican	Joe Borelli (incumbent)	30,653	78.55%
Conservative	Joe Borelli (incumbent)	2,513	6.4%
Total	Joe Borelli (incumbent)	33,166	84.95%
Democratic	Olivia Drabczyk	5,852	14.99%
Write-in		24%	0.06%
Total votes		39,042	100.00%

==== Endorsements ====
Olivia Drabczyk

Labor unions

- Professional Staff Congress, CUNY

Organizations

- New York League of Conservation Voters
- Run for Something
- Stonewall Democratic Club of New York City

== 2022 Speaker election ==
Corey Johnson could not run for re-election as Speaker because of term limits. The following individuals expressed their interest in running:

- Adrienne Adams - District 28, Queens
- Diana Ayala - District 8, The Bronx/Manhattan
- Justin Brannan - District 43, Brooklyn
- Gale Brewer - District 6, Manhattan
- Francisco Moya - District 21, Queens
- Keith Powers - District 4, Manhattan
- Carlina Rivera - District 2, Manhattan

Joe Borelli (District 51, Staten Island) was expected to lead the Republican minority.

== See also ==
- 2021 New York City mayoral election
- 2021 New York City Comptroller election
- 2021 New York City Public Advocate election
- 2021 New York City Borough President elections
