= CB10 =

CB10 might refer to:

- CB postcode area, in the United Kingdom
- Bronx Community Board 10, in New York City
- Brooklyn Community Board 10, in New York City
- Manhattan Community Board 10, in New York City
- Queens Community Board 10, in New York City
