= New York City's 15th City Council district =

District in the New York City Council

- Boundaries following the 2020 census

Government
  - Councilmember: Oswald Feliz (D—Fordham)

Population (2010)
  - Total: 167,995

Demographics
  - Hispanic: 66%
  - Black: 25%
  - White: 5%
  - Asian: 2%
  - Other: 2%

Registration
  - Democratic: 75.2%
  - Republican: 4.8%
  - No party preference: 17.2%
- Registered voters (2021) 93,211

New York City's 15th City Council district is one of 51 districts in the New York City Council. It has been represented by Democrat Oswald Feliz since a 2021 special election to succeed fellow Democrat Ritchie Torres.

== Geography ==
District 15 covers neighborhoods in the geographical center of the Bronx, including some or all of Belmont, Tremont, Fordham, Bedford Park, Williamsbridge, East Tremont, Van Nest, Allerton, and West Farms. Bronx Park, which contains both the Bronx Zoo and the New York Botanical Garden, is located within the district.

The district overlaps with Bronx Community Boards 3, 4, 5, 6, 7, 9, 11, and 12, and with New York's 13th, 14th, 15th, and 16th congressional districts. It also overlaps with the 32nd, 33rd, 34th, and 36th districts of the New York State Senate, and with the 77th, 78th, 79th, 80th, 86th, and 87th districts of the New York State Assembly.

== Recent election results ==
=== 2025 ===
2025 New York City Council election, District 15
Party	Candidate	Votes	%
Democratic	Oswald Feliz (incumbent)	14,537	85.7
Republican	Aramis Ocasio	1,964	11.6
Conservative	Gary Lutz	430	2.5
Write-in		41	0.2
Total votes		16,972	100.0
Democratic hold			

=== 2023 (redistricting) ===
Due to redistricting and the 2020 changes to the New York City Charter, councilmembers elected during the 2021 and 2023 City Council elections will serve two-year terms, with full four-year terms resuming after the 2025 New York City Council elections.

2023 New York City Council election, District 15
Party	Candidate	Votes	%
Democratic	Oswald Feliz (incumbent)	3,215	79.9
Republican	Erica Elias	504	12.5
Conservative	Jose Padilla Jr.	275	6.8
Write-in		32	0.8
Total votes		4,026	100.0
Democratic hold			

=== 2021 ===
In 2019, voters in New York City approved Ballot Question 1, which implemented ranked-choice voting in all local elections. Under the new system, voters have the option to rank up to five candidates for every local office. Voters whose first-choice candidates fare poorly will have their votes redistributed to other candidates in their ranking until one candidate surpasses the 50 percent threshold. If one candidate surpasses 50 percent in first-choice votes, then ranked-choice tabulations will not occur.

2021 New York City Council election, District 15 Democratic primary
Party	Candidate	Maximum round	Maximum votes	Share in maximum round	Maximum votes First round votes Transfer votes
Democratic	Oswald Feliz (incumbent)	7	4,348	65.2%	
Democratic	Ischia Bravo	7	2,325	34.8%	
Democratic	Bernadette Ferrara	6	1,421	19.6%	
Democratic	John Sanchez	4	1,195	15.6%	
Democratic	Troy Blackwell	3	902	11.3%	
Democratic	Kenny Agosto	2	194	2.4%	
Democratic	Latchmi Devi Gopal	2	194	2.4%	
Democratic	Lilithe Lozano	2	166	2.0%	
Write-in		1	31	0.4%	

2021 New York City Council election, District 15 Republican primary
Party	Candidate	Maximum round	Maximum votes	Share in maximum round	Maximum votes First round votes Transfer votes
Republican	Ariel Rivera-Diaz	2	80	53.7%	
Republican	Aramis Ocasio	2	69	46.3%	
Write-in		1	15	9.4%	

An interactive map of District 15

2021 New York City Council election, District 15 general election
Party	Candidate	Votes	%
Democratic	Oswald Feliz (incumbent)	7,224	84.1
Republican	Ariel Rivera-Diaz	1,097	
Conservative	Ariel Rivera-Diaz	243	
Total	Ariel Rivera-Diaz	1,340	15.7
Write-in		21	0.2
Total votes		8,585	100
Democratic hold			

=== 2021 special ===
In November 2020, Councilmember Ritchie Torres was elected to represent New York's 15th congressional district, triggering a special election for his Council seat. Like all municipal special elections in New York City, the race was officially nonpartisan, with all candidates running on ballot lines of their own creation. Following Ballot Question 1's approval in 2019, special elections will also utilize ranked-choice voting.

2021 New York City Council special election, District 15
Party	Candidate	Maximum round	Maximum votes	Share in maximum round	Maximum votes First round votes Transfer votes
Nonpartisan	Oswald Feliz	10	1,766	56.5%	
Nonpartisan	Ischia Bravo	10	1,362	43.5%	
Nonpartisan	John Sanchez	9	1,062	30.4%	
Nonpartisan	Elisa Crespo	8	712	19.5%	
Nonpartisan	Latchmi Devi Gopal	7	184	5.0%	
Nonpartisan	Kenny Agosto	6	113	3.0%	
Nonpartisan	Altagracia Soldevilla	5	107	2.8%	
Nonpartisan	Bernadette Ferrara	4	89	2.3%	
Nonpartisan	José Padilla	3	78	2.0%	
Nonpartisan	Ariel Rivera-Diaz	2	45	1.2%	
Write-in		1	12	0.3%	

=== 2017 ===
2017 New York City Council election, District 15
Party	Candidate	Votes	%
Democratic	Ritchie Torres	9,355	
Working Families	Ritchie Torres	477	
Total	Ritchie Torres (incumbent)	9,832	93.6
Republican	Jayson Cancel	521	
Conservative	Jayson Cancel	138	
Total	Jayson Cancel	659	6.3
Write-in		18	0.1
Total votes		10,509	100
Democratic hold			

=== 2013 ===
2013 New York City Council election, District 15
Primary election
Party	Candidate	Votes	%
Democratic	Ritchie Torres	2,771	36.1
Democratic	Joel Rivera	1,641	21.4
Democratic	Cynthia Tompkins	1,609	21.0
Democratic	Albert Alvarez	690	9.0
Democratic	Raquel Batista	569	7.4
Democratic	Joel Bauza	392	5.1
Write-in		3	0.0
Total votes		7,675	100
General election
Democratic	Ritchie Torres	9,341	
Working Families	Ritchie Torres	262	
Total	Ritchie Torres	9,603	91.1
Republican	Joel Rivera	758	7.2
Conservative	Joel Bauza	154	1.5
Write-in		21	0.2
Total votes		10,536	100
Democratic hold			
