= Courage to Change =

Courage to Change may refer to:

- Courage to Change (political action committee), American political organization
- "Courage to Change" (song), 2020 Sia song
