= Oswald Feliz =

American politician, attorney (born 1990)

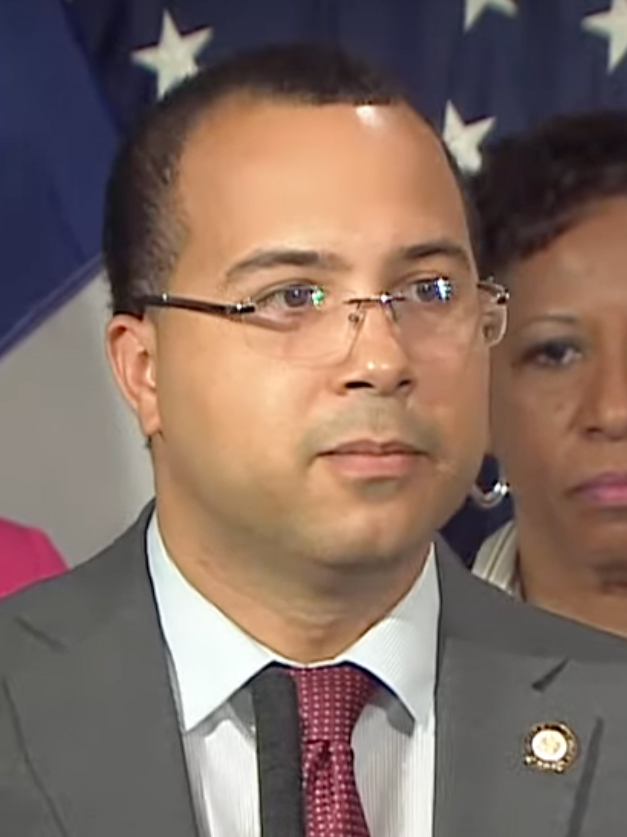

Member of the New York City Council from the 15th district
- Incumbent
- Assumed office April 15, 2021
- Preceded by: Ritchie Torres

Personal details
- Born: October 29, 1990 (age 36)
- Party: Democratic
- Education: Lehman College (BA); City University of New York (JD)

Oswald Feliz (born October 29, 1990) is an American politician and attorney serving as a member of the New York City Council from the 15th district. He assumed office on April 15, 2021.

== Early life and education ==
Feliz is a native of The Bronx. After graduating from Walton High School, he earned a Bachelor of Arts degree in political science and philosophy from Lehman College and a Juris Doctor from the CUNY School of Law.

== Career ==
Feliz worked on the staff of State Senator Gustavo Rivera. Since graduating from law school, Feliz has worked as a tenant lawyer, defending vulnerable tenants at risk of eviction. He is also an adjunct professor at Hostos Community College. In 2016, Feliz worked on Adriano Espaillat's historic congressional campaign.

Feliz was elected to the New York City Council in a March 2021 special election to succeed Ritchie Torres, who was elected to the United States House of Representatives; In that election, Espaillat supported Feliz, who was one of the "Squadriano". During Feliz's 2025 re-election bid, Airbnb's Affordable New York SuperPAC paid for ads and mailers supporting his campaign.

Feliz is viewed as a moderate Democrat.

=== While on City Council ===
In his first term on the Council, Feliz chaired the Small Business Committee. He endorsed Francisco Moya for Speaker of the City Council, as part of a group saying they aimed to "rectify" the fact that there were no citywide or statewide elected officials who are Latino. Moya lost to Adrienne Adams.

Feliz opposed a Fordham Road offset bus lane that would have increased bus speeds by approximately 20%.

After being re-elected in 2025, Feliz, allied with newly chosen Speaker Julie Menin, was appointed to chair the Public Safety committee. In that role, he has held hearings on school crossing guards and sought answers on the reasons for a city 911 outage. In March 2026, he questioned Police Commissioner Jessica Tisch on the rising rate of shootings in the Bronx, in response to which Tisch said that she would not have NYPD officers' work "mischaracterized".

== Electoral history ==
=== 2025 ===
2025 New York City Council election, District 15
Party	Candidate	Votes	%
Democratic	Oswald Feliz (incumbent)	14,537	85.7
Republican	Aramis Ocasio	1,964	11.6
Conservative	Gary Lutz	430	2.5
Write-in		41	0.2
Total votes		16,972	100.0
Democratic hold			

=== 2023 ===
2023 New York City Council election, District 15
Party	Candidate	Votes	%
Democratic	Oswald Feliz (incumbent)	3,213	79.8
Republican	Erica Elias	504	12.5
Conservative	Jose A. Padilla Jr.	275	6.8
Write-in		34	0.8
Total votes		4,026	100.0
Democratic hold			

=== 2021 ===
2021 New York City's 15th City Council district special election
Party	Candidate	Maximum round	Maximum votes	Share in maximum round	Maximum votes First round votes Transfer votes
People United	Oswald Feliz	10	1,766	56.5%	
We Matter	Ischia J. Bravo	10	1,362	43.5%	
Community First	John E. Sanchez	9	1,062	30.4%	
Jobs & Justice	Elisa Crespo	8	712	19.5%	
Go For The Bronx	Latchmi Devi Gopal	7	184	5.0%	
Empower People	Kenny G. Agosto	6	113	3.0%	
People First	Altagracia Soldevilla	5	107	2.8%	
Fifteen Forward	Bernadette Ferrara	4	89	2.3%	
Safe & Stable	Jose A. Padilla Jr.	3	78	2.0%	
Second Choice	Ariel Rivera-Diaz	2	45	1.2%	
Write-In		1	12	0.3%	
Democratic hold					

2021 New York City Council Democratic primary, District 15
Party	Candidate	Maximum round	Maximum votes	Share in maximum round	Maximum votes First round votes Transfer votes
Democratic	Oswald Feliz (incumbent)	7	4,348	65.2%	
Democratic	Ischia J. Bravo	7	2,325	34.8%	
Democratic	Bernadette Ferrara	6	1,421	19.6%	
Democratic	John E. Sanchez	4	1,195	15.6%	
Democratic	Troy Blackwell	3	902	11.3%	
Democratic	Kenny G. Agosto	2	194	2.4%	
Democratic	Latchmi Devi Gopal	2	194	2.4%	
Democratic	Lillithe Lozano	2	166	2.0%	
Write-In		1	31	0.4%	

2021 New York City Council election, District 15
Party	Candidate	Votes	%
Democratic	Oswald Feliz (incumbent)	7,224	84.1
Republican	Ariel Rivera-Diaz	1,097	12.8
Conservative	Ariel Rivera-Diaz	243	2.8
Total	Ariel Rivera-Diaz	1,340	15.6
Write-in		21	0.2
Total votes		8,585	100.0
Democratic hold			
