= Norman Seabrook =

Prison guard union leader

- Born: February 23, 1960 (age 66); Bronx, New York, U.S.
- Education: Empire State College
- Occupation: Corrections officer
- Employer: New York City Department of Correction (former)
- Organization: Correction Officers Benevolent Association
- Known for: Leadership; Corruption
- Title: President
- Term: 1995–2016
- Predecessor: Stanley Israel
- Successor: Elias Husamudeen
- Status: Convicted
- Criminal charges: 1.) honest services fraud; 2.) conspiracy
- Penalty: 58 months incarceration
- Capture status: Incarcerated

Details
- Imprisoned at: FCI Beckley

Notes
- Federal Inmate # 77754-054

Norman Seabrook is an American former law enforcement officer and union leader who was the president of the Correction Officers' Benevolent Association from 1995 to 2016.

== Career ==
Seabrook became a corrections officer in 1985. He received his Bachelor of Arts degree from Empire State College. As leader of COBA, which represents more than 9,000 officers within the New York City Department of Correction, Seabrook was known for his strong defense for union members.

Seabrook lobbied for legislation to protect and benefit corrections officers, including the Variable Supplement Fund Bill, the Heart Bill, the ¾ Disability Bill, and the Feces Bill. Seabrook fought for deals, sometimes in unison with other city unions, including the Police Benevolent Association of the City of New York and the Uniformed Firefighters Association. Seabrook lobbied for corrections officers to gain parity with the NYPD and the FDNY in pay and benefits. In 2001, Seabrook was appointed by New York Governor George Pataki to the three-person, bipartisan "Task Force to Reform New York State and New York City Elections".

Seabrook hosted his own radio show called, Real Talk, Real Time on WWRL 1600 AM in New York City market. This show aired weekly on Fridays.

=== Criminal issues ===
Seabrook was charged with taking a $60,000 bribe in connection with a $20 million investment of union members' money. Seabrook was said to have been "presented with a Ferragamo bag by Jona Rechnitz." $19 million of that investment was lost, but through lengthy deals $4.5 million has been restituted. Seabrook was indicted by a federal grand jury on July 7, 2016, along with co-defendant Murray Huberfeld. Huberfield was the founder of Platinum Partners, a hedge fund to which COBA funds would be directed by Seabrook. In return for the COBA investments, Seabrook received kickbacks of between $100,000 and $150,000, depending on the amount invested by COBA. The first trial ended in a hung jury. In the second trial, Seabrook was convicted of corruption and was sentenced to 58 months in prison.

As a result of the legal issues, his bank attempted to foreclose on his home.
