= Emil Lucev =

American historian

Emil Robert Lucev (September 27, 1933 – June 7, 2018) was an American journalist and historian of Far Rockaway. His work includes study of the early amusement parks created by LaMarcus Adna Thompson and George C. Tilyou, the restoration and history of the Cornell Cemetery, and other features of The Rockaways, and his newspaper articles in The Wave of Long Island. He is the author of The Rockaways, a 2007 postcard history of the peninsula.

== Early life ==
He was born September 27, 1933, at Rockaway Beach Hospital (Far Rockaway, Queens), Beach 85th Street and Java Place, to Emil Gerald Lucev of Prvika’Lucka, Croatia and Anna Mary Lewis of Hoboken, New Jersey. Emil Gerald emigrated to the United States in 1927 and became a hotel chef. Anna's family moved to the Rockaways when she was very young. They married in 1931 at St. Rose Roman Catholic Church in Rockaway Beach. Emil Robert is the oldest of three children that also include Anthony and Almeda.

At the age of ten, Lucev was sent to work at Arverne Hygeia Ice Company, for his grandfather, Mike Louis. At Paramount Carton, at Rockaway Beach Boulevard and Beach 79 Street, he worked as a finishing machine adjuster. He attended Jacob Haaren High School where he studied refrigeration. The Army drafted him and sent him to Fort Belvoir, Virginia, sending him to refrigeration school.

After the Army, Lucev returned to the Rockaways where he met Aldine Caroline Gartland and married her on June 29, 1959. Eventually they had four children, Michael, Emil Robert, Jr., Aldine and Katherine.

He returned to working for the finishing department Paramount Carton until 1961, when he was hired as a security guard for The New York Daily News until the security force was laid off in 1991.

== Historian ==
In the 1970s, Emil and his sons began collecting bottles from Rockaway businesses that they retrieved from Jamaica Bay. They began researching the companies whose names were on the bottles. He became friends with Leon Locke, publisher of the Rockaways' local newspaper, The Wave, eventually being dubbed the Historical Editor, writing the weekly column, “Historical Views of the Rockaways.” In this column, he covered both his personal interests and topics sent to him by residents of the area for further research. On a boat trip in Jamaica Bay with dignitaries, authors, and politicians, Locke appointed Lucev as tour guide. When he revealed to the impressed crowd his low level of education, he was shunned by them for the remainder of the trip, although his greater familiarity with the channels of Jamaica Bay also forced him to act as navigator on the trip. This convinced him of a serious need for a greater stock of knowledge of the area, driving him to document the entire peninsula. The result was a 2007 postcard history book, The Rockaways.

In 1985, Lucev was involved with the Rockaways’ Tercentennial celebration, and in 1986, the time capsule buried at the Doughboy Monument at Beach 95 Street and Rockaway Beach Boulevard.

In 1986, Lucev was involved with the re-enactment of the NC-4 Transatlantic flight of Alcock and Brown, and wrote a booklet of the event. He edited the centennial and 110th anniversary editions of The Wave in 1993 and 2003, supplied “Irishtown, Rockaway” for The Irish Echo, and has helped schools, hospitals, churches, fire departments, and organizations document their history. He has also researched the peninsula's beaches and boardwalks.

In 1991, he worked with Stanley Cogan, President of the Queens Historical Society and Cornell Cemetery Corporation President to restore the cemetery and to designate it a New York City Landmark.
