= The Wave of Long Island =

Newspaper in Rockaway, New York City

The Wave Newspaper
- Type: Weekly newspaper
- Owner(s): Wave of Queens, Inc. (The Queens Ledger)
- Founded: 1893; 133 years ago
- Language: English
- City: Rockaway Beach, New York
- Country: United States
- Website: www.rockawave.com

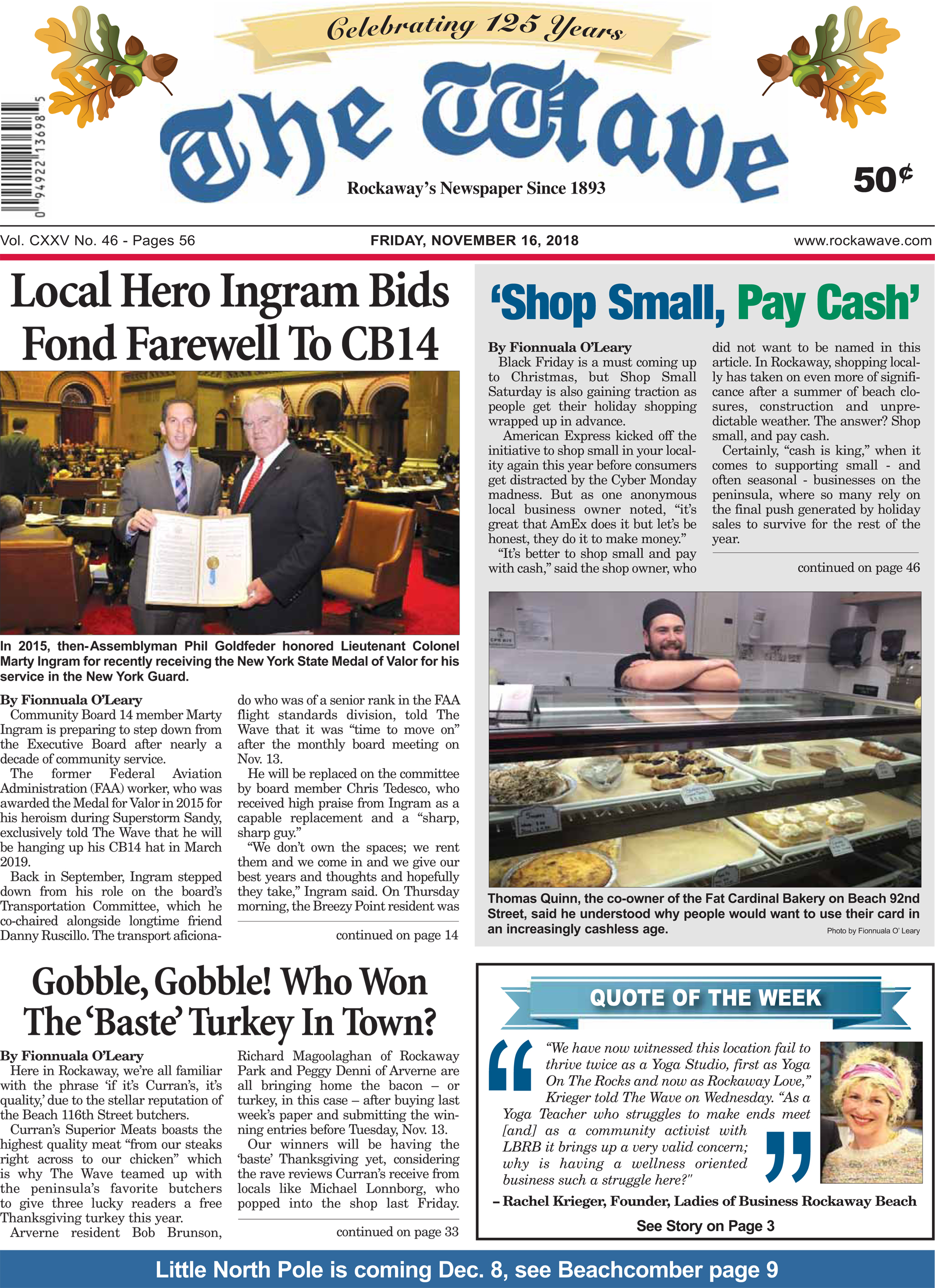
A recent front page from The Wave. distributed on 103 newsstands in Rockaway, Broad Channel and Howard Beach Queens

The Wave is the longest-lived and most widely circulated newspaper in the Rockaway Peninsula, New York City Borough of Queens. The weekly newspaper, currently under Editor In Chief Mark C. Healey, is well known to Rockaway residents for coverage of community events and local politics. The paper contains considerable historical information about Rockaway, largely provided by historian Emil Lucev. The Wave's US Postal Statement of Management and Circulation for 2018 indicates the paper was sold to the owners of The Queens Ledger group ending 125 years of independent local control and ownership. Since 2018, the new publisher, lifelong Queens resident, Walter H. Sanchez and his son, John Sanchez, have continued the local charm of the paper with a number of glossy editions including the yearly Rockaway Almanac, Summer Guide, Anniversary Issue and a yearly glossy Rockaway Health and Wellness Guide. On October 1, 2022, The Wave operated a 'Rockaway Family Fun Day Festival' on Beach 116th Street - featuring live bands, rides, health agencies like St. Johns Episcopal Hospital and The Joseph P. Addabbo Family Health Center. The event was also the debut of the yearly 'Meat-Up-Grill' Burger Eating Contest.

Weekly columns add to the local coverage readers of The Wave are accustomed to. Fishing Report by Captain Vinnie Calabro, Who's Playing and Gotham Baseball by Mark Healey, All In with John Jastremski, Glorified Tomato by Paula DiGioia, The Financial Wave by Robert Intelisano, SIT with John Roberts, Wavemaker by Kerry Murtha and Sullivan's Stories by Kay Sullivan. Weekly Issue is here.

Its Beachcomber weekly column is also a daily newsletter sent to almost 10K email subscribers on a daily basis. The paper now conducts local reader polls on local political races

The paper has won numerous New York Press Awards, most notable for its local editorial illustration/cartoons, drawn by Thomas Kerr.

The paper originated in the aftermath of the great Rockaway Beach Seaside fire of 1892. A local publisher, in the desire to keep the community informed of the event, published a broadsheet with the headline, "WAVE OF FIRE SWEEPS ROCKAWAY". The favorable response to the broadsheet led him to establish a weekly newspaper which he dubbed The Wave of Long Island after the initial headline.
