= Leo C. Zeferetti =

American politician

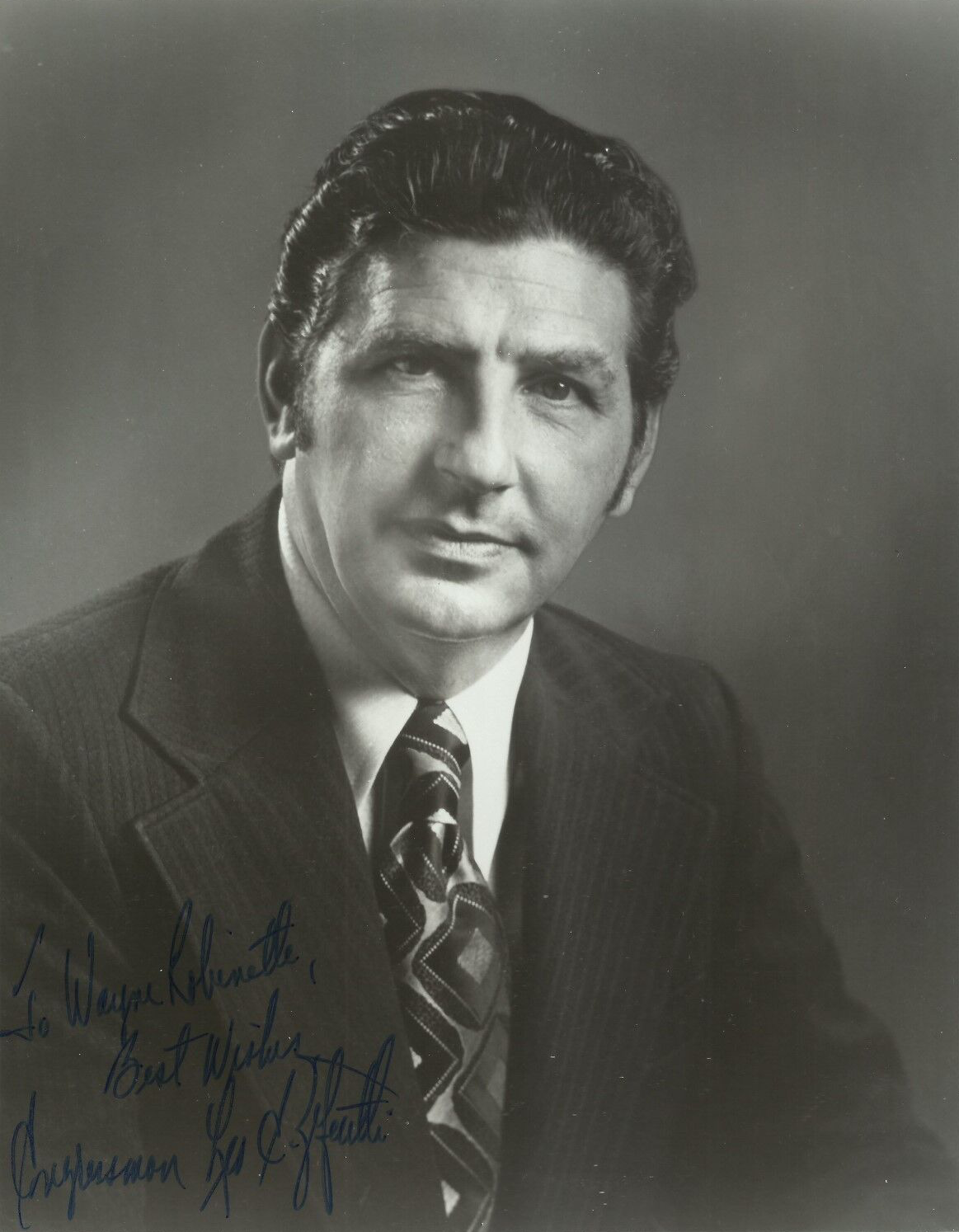

Member of the U.S. House of Representatives from New York's 15th district
- In office January 3, 1975 – January 3, 1983
- Preceded by: Hugh L. Carey
- Succeeded by: S. William Green

Personal details
- Born: July 15, 1927 Brooklyn, New York, U.S.
- Died: March 21, 2018 (aged 90) Davie, Florida, U.S.
- Party: Democratic
- Education: New York University; Baruch College

Military service
- Allegiance: United States
- Branch/service: United States Navy

Leo C. Zeferetti (July 15, 1927 – March 21, 2018) was a Democratic member of the United States House of Representatives from New York. Born in Brooklyn, New York, he attended public schools in the borough. He served in the United States Navy from 1944 to 1946 (attaining the rank of petty officer second class as a yeoman) and was an officer of the New York City Department of Correction from 1957 to 1974. During this period, he enrolled at New York University (1963) and Baruch College (1964-1966) but did not take a degree from either institution.

Zeferetti was a member of the New York State Crime Control Planning Board from 1972 to 1974 and a representative to President's Conference on Correction in 1971. He served as the president of the Correction Officers' Benevolent Association from 1968 to 1974.

In 1974, he was elected from a district that included the Park Slope, Sunset Park, Bay Ridge, Dyker Heights, Bensonhurst and Bath Beach sections of Brooklyn, succeeding longtime incumbent Hugh Carey following his ascendancy to the governorship of New York. His district was eliminated in redistricting in 1982, and the bulk of its territory was merged with the Staten Island-based district of freshman Republican Guy Molinari, who defeated him in the general election that year.

== Sources ==
- United States Congress. "Leo C. Zeferetti (id: Z000002)". Biographical Directory of the United States Congress.

U.S. House of Representatives
Preceded by Hugh L. Carey	Member of the U.S. House of Representatives from New York's 15th congressional district 1975–1983	Succeeded by S. William Green
