= Mule (newspaper) =

MULE is a non-profit, independent media project based in Manchester, England. It is openly political and critical of local councils and politicians, big business, and property developers, privatisation of public space, public bodies and Greater Manchester Police.

== History ==
The first pilot print issue came out in 2006. The idea for the project was born out of the now closed Basement social centre in Manchester. The founders wrote "A spectre now haunts the world: a global commercial media system dominated by a small number of huge corporations. It is a system that works to advance the cause of the global market and promote commercial values, while denigrating journalism and culture not conducive to the immediate bottom line or long-run corporate interests. Ten years ago in the UK, the media was spread across 50 companies. Now, when its down to four conglomerates. The few major media multinationals have unprecedented power, owning press and television, book publishing, film production, and databases. The British government has recently announced a relaxation of the media rules allowing conglomerates to swallow even more of the industry."

The original paper was designed as a national paper with local sections for different cities. It was relaunched in 2008 as a local Manchester-focused project.

The newspaper had a quarterly print run of 10,000, distributed free around the city of Manchester until August 2010. In 2010 the group became incorporated as Mule Media Ltd and is part of the Co-ops UK network.

== Mission and description ==
MULE's mission is to reach out to a wide-ranging cross-section of society, producing an accessible and tabloid style paper, which aims to address issues the mainstream local media neglect via investigative journalism. It focuses on a number of areas its members consider important, particularly local democracy, corporate power and big business in Manchester, local public bodies and quangos, property developers and regeneration, right-wing extremism and racism (particularly the British National Party and English Defence League), deportation and detention of migrants, community campaigns, and local cultural events. It has been critical of the Conservative-Liberal Democrat Coalition and has actively reported on local groups fighting the government's austerity drive and cuts to public services.

MULE is openly political and critical of local councils and politicians, big business, and property developers, privatisation of public space, public bodies and Greater Manchester Police. It is committed to social, economic, and environmental justice and social change.

The website also provides an online diary (which includes all of Manchester City Council's public meetings) for local groups to post events on. On the website the collective encourage new writers to get involved and for local people to send in their stories.

== Editors and contributors ==
MULE is unusual in that it practices a collective editing process. This means that instead of having one editor who makes major decisions alone, the approval of sub-editors and management collective members is required. This is a similar method of organizing to the New York-based Indypendent Newspaper.

The writers and researchers for MULE have varying levels of journalistic experience, from first-time writers to professional journalists. At present MULE is entirely volunteer-run with no paid staff in the core group of six individuals. The MULE collective however has expressed its desire to pay its core members. MULE provides occasional workshops and media training for new writers and contributors.

== Funding ==
MULE is funded by various foundations and funding bodies, and is trying to diversify its income through individual donations, subscriptions, merchandise and advertising.
