= The Indypendent =

New York City newspaper

- A Free Paper for Free People
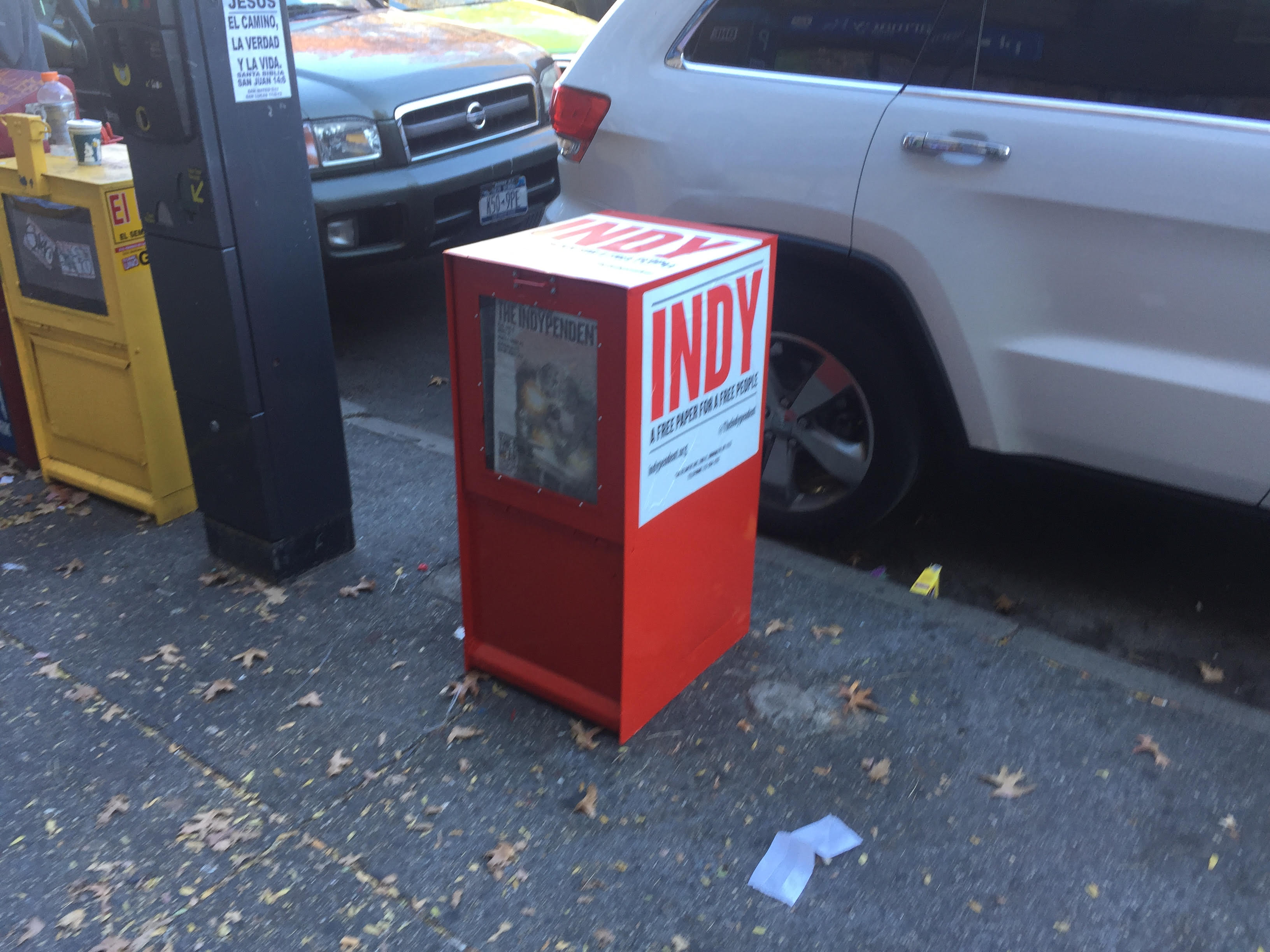
- One of many Indypendent newsboxes located throughout New York City
- Type: Monthly newspaper
- Owner(s): The Indypendent, Inc.
- Founded: 2000; 26 years ago
- Language: English
- City: Brooklyn, New York
- Country: United States
- Website: indypendent.org

The Indypendent is a progressive newspaper based in Brooklyn, New York, United States. It is published monthly, distributed worldwide and is available for free throughout New York City and online. It currently prints 30,000 copies per issue, covering local, national and international news, food, cinema and culture. Reader donations comprise the bulk of The Indypendent's funding.

== History ==
Building on the Indymedia network and anti-globalization movement following the WTO Ministerial Conference of 1999, New York City activists Heather Haddon and Ana Nogueira launched a four-page newspaper (The Unst8ed) in advance of the Sept. 8, 2000 U.N. Millennium Summit. Coinciding with the founding of a local Indymedia chapter in New York, the paper focused on rising global opposition to unchecked corporate power. By its second issue the paper was renamed The Indypendent, and sought to bring the journalism of Indymedia "offline" to those without internet access, to bridge the gap between local and global issues, and to inform members of both the activist and non-activist community.

Prior to the September 11, 2001 attacks The Indypendent focused largely, though not entirely, on local issues, examining the corporatization of New York public schools, the decimation of public space, and the placing of power plants in overwhelmingly poor areas of New York City. Following 9/11, the paper increasingly covered international and national affairs, in addition to local issues. The paper increasingly grew in the physical sense, as well, reaching 24 pages in the days leading up to the 2002 World Economic Forum meetings in New York. In first days of the Iraq War, the paper increased its publishing frequency and decreased its size in order to better deal with the surge of content. In the month before the 2004 Republican National Convention, the paper went color.

== Organization and structure ==
The Indypendent is a volunteer-driven newspaper. It has two full-time staff members and relies on a core group of volunteers as well as a rotating cast of contributing writers. John Tarleton is the current editor, Peter Rugh the associate editor, Frank Reynoso the illustration director, Mikael Tarkela the director of design, and Elia Gran the social media editor. Ellen Davidson, Alina Mogilyanskaya, Nicholas Powers, and Steven Wishnia are contributing editors to the paper.

== Awards and alumni activities ==
The Indypendent has won numerous awards from the New York City Independent Press Association ("Ippies"), including 11 in 2005. Writer Sarah Stuteville won a 2004 James Aronson Award for Social Justice Journalism for her work with the Indypendent and has since founded the Common Language Project. Most of the paper's volunteers are active within various elements of the New York City social justice community.

== Reception ==
The Indypendent′s June 2002 decision to expel one of its members for disruptive behavior caused great consternation in the network, though similar personality clashes have since become rather common within Indymedia. The paper was one of the first Indymedia projects to accept paid advertising, and it was also one of the first projects to formally pay its volunteers for their labor. The paper's wide-ranging acceptance of left-wing ideologies (including more traditionally leftist and Maoist viewpoints) has also been criticized by many anarchists.

The Indypendent has been heralded as the paper that those who miss the political reporting of The Village Voice should read for local news. The newspaper is considered one of the most reliable independent sources for off-the-beaten-path journalism in New York City, as reported by The Village Voice in 2017. The Indypendent was also celebrated by Democracy Now! with Amy Goodman — the most widely known Indymedia outlet — in 2019 as a newspaper that grew out of New York City Indymedia. Other left-leaning publications across the city, country and world have re-published Indypendent articles, as the publication's reporters often cover topics that are not covered elsewhere.

In recent years, The Indypendent has taken on a more prominent role in reporting on election politics on the local, state and presidential level. In 2018, the publication was the first to have Congresswoman Alexandria Ocasio-Cortez on its cover. Later that year, New York Senator Julia Salazar would also make the cover, as noticed by Tablet magazine. During New York City's 2021 mayoral election, Indypendent reporter Theodore Hamm was mentioned by New York Magazine as having "followed the Brooklyn Democratic Party closely" based on his reporting for the Indy.

== See also ==
- Mule Newspaper, Manchester-based independent media project
