= Uniformed Firefighters Association =

Non Profit Organization for Firefighters in New York

The Uniformed Firefighters Association of Greater NY is Local 94 of the International Association of Fire Fighters, the union representing New York City Firefighters. Founded in 1917, the UFA is a non-profit advocacy organization representing the health, safety and interests of New York City Firefighters.

== See also ==
- Fire Department of New York
- Health effects of the September 11, 2001 attacks
