= Correction Officers' Benevolent Association =

Trade union in New York

COBA
- Correction Officers' Benevolent Association
- Founded: 1901
- Headquarters: 77-10 21st Avenue East Elmhurst, New York
- Location: United States
- Members: 18000
- Key people: Benny Boscio
- Affiliations: DCNY
- Website: www.cobanyc.org

The Correction Officers' Benevolent Association (COBA) is the second largest trade union for law enforcement in New York. COBA is also the largest municipal jail union in the United States. It represents corrections staff within the New York City Department of Correction run by the New York City Department of Correction. It has a membership of 9,000.

== History and activities ==
COBA was able to get personal protection equipment for their officers during the COVID-19 pandemic. COBA criticized the NYC government for their response to COVID 19 COBA fought to bar fisitors to Rikers Island during the COVID 19 pandemic.

COBA president Benny Boscio fought to maintain solitary confinement and keep Rikers Island open as a jail.

COBA endorsed Barack Obama for president in 2008.

COBA pushed through the "Feces Bill" which made it a felony to throw feces at a corrections officer.

COBA was involved in supporting compensation parity for corrections officers, the NYPD, and the FDNY.

== Presidents ==
- Benny Boscio Jr. (2020 to present)
- Elias Husamudeen (acting president)(2016 to 2020)
- Norman Seabrook (1995-2016)
- Stanley Israel (?-1995)
- Phil Seelig (1979-?)
- Donald J. Cranston (1976-1977)
- Harold Brown (1974-?)
- Congressman Leo Zeferetti (1968-1974)
- John A. Martine (1966)
- Stephen Hartigan

== See also ==
- Anthony S. Seminerio
