= Uniformed Fire Officers Association =

Uniformed Fire Officers Association (UFOA) is a union for lieutenants, captains, battalion chiefs, deputy chiefs, medical officers and supervising fire marshals in the Fire Department of New York. The organization is Local 854 of the International Association of Fire Fighters. Lieutenant James G McCarthy is the current president of the UFOA. Chief Lemonda preceded Lieutenant McCarthy. Capt. Hagan preceded Chief LeMonda. Battalion Chief Jack McDonnell preceded Capt. Hagan. Peter Gorman was president from 1999-2007.

== Relations with former mayor Rudy Giuliani ==
Officials with the union campaigned against Rudy Giuliani in his bid for the presidency in 2008. One official, John J. McDonnell, a battalion chief, says, "I don’t think the person in Nebraska has any idea yet how we feel.” "He probably assumes that we think he’s great.”

UFOA spokesman Martin Steadman criticized Giuliani for not adequately addressing the problem of faulty radios, first evidenced in the 1993 terrorist bombing of the World Trade Center. Over 200 firefighters in the Twin Towers were using the faulty analog radios that were used during the 1993 bombing. Steadman added, "We're saying he had eight years to solve that problem."
