= Courage to Change (political action committee) =

Political action committee

- Founded: 2020
- Founders: Alexandria Ocasio-Cortez
- Website: couragetochangepac.org

Courage to Change is an American political action committee launched by U.S. Representative Alexandria Ocasio-Cortez to elect progressive challenger candidates. The PAC was first announced in January 2020 and the next month, endorsed seven women running for congressional seats. Courage to Change made $160,000 in contributions in the first quarter of 2021. The PAC did not give to endangered Democrats in the second quarter of 2021, following an issue in the first quarter in which those campaigns sought to return unsolicited donations from Ocasio-Cortez to avoid blowback from affiliation with her.

== Candidates ==
Candidate	Office
Jessica Cisneros	Texas's 28th congressional district
Kara Eastman	Nebraska's 2nd congressional district
Teresa Leger Fernandez	New Mexico's 3rd congressional district
Georgette Gómez	California's 53rd congressional district
Samelys López	New York's 15th congressional district
Marie Newman	Illinois's 3rd congressional district
Cristina Tzintzún Ramirez	Texas U.S. Senator
