= Manhattan Community Board 10 =

Community District in New York, United States

Manhattan Community District 10
- Community District
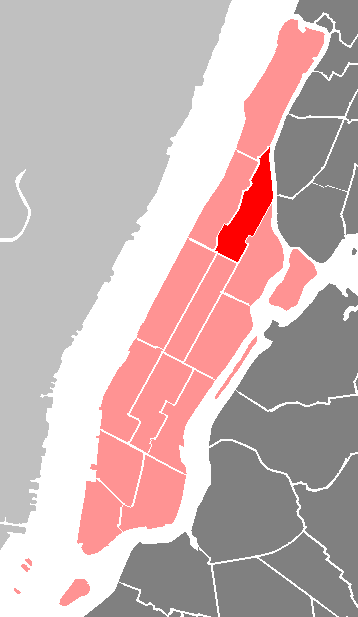
- Country: United States
- State: New York
- City: New York City
- Borough: Manhattan
- Neighborhoods: Central Harlem

Government
  - Chairperson: Marquis Harrison
  - District Manager: Minah Whyte

Area
  - Land: 1.4 sq mi (3.6 km^{2})

Population (2010)
  - Total: 115,723
  - Density: 83,000/sq mi (32,000/km^{2})

Ethnicity
  - Hispanic and Latino Americans: 23.8%
  - African-American: 55.3%
  - White: 14.2%
  - Asian: 3.4%
  - Others: 3.3%
- Time zone: UTC−5 (Eastern)
  - Summer (DST): UTC−4 (EDT)
- Area code: 212, 646, and 332, and 917
- Police Precincts: 28th (website); 32nd (website)
- Website: www1.nyc.gov/html/mancb10/html/home/home.shtml

The Manhattan Community Board 10 is a New York City community board encompassing the neighborhoods of Harlem and Polo Grounds in the borough of Manhattan. It is delimited by Fifth Avenue and Mount Morris Park on the east, Central Park on the south, Harlem River drive, Edgecombe Avenue, Saint Nicholas Avenue, the 123rd street and Morningside Avenue on the west, as well as by the Harlem River on the north.

== Demographics ==
As of 2010, the Community Board has a population of 115,723 up from 107,109 in 2000 and 99,519 in 1990. Of them, 72,858 (63.0%) are African-American, 11,050 (9.5%) are White non Hispanic, 2,833 (2.4%) Asian or Pacific Islander, 356 (0.3%) American Indian or Native Alaskan, 362 (0.3%) of some other race, 2,572 (2.2%) of two or more races, 25,692 (22.2%) of Hispanic origins. 42.7% of the population benefit from public assistance as of 2012, down from 45.3% in 2005.

The land area is 897 acres, or 1.4 square miles (3.6 km^{2}).
