= Elisa Crespo =

American politician and transgender activist

- Born: New York City, New York, U.S.
- Education: John Jay College of Criminal Justice
- Political party: Democratic Party
- Website: www.elisacrespo.com

Elisa Crespo is an American activist, nonprofit executive, and politician from New York City. She is the former executive director of the New Pride Agenda and current executive director of the Stonewall Community Foundation. Crespo ran in the 2021 New York City Council election.

== Early life and education ==
Crespo was born in New York City, and raised in several boroughs of the city by her Puerto Rican mother. During her childhood, her family relied on public benefits such as food stamps, Section 8, and Medicaid. After she met other trans women and understood her own identity, she transitioned when she was 15. She began sex work by age 16, and at 19 was diagnosed with HIV. In November 2012, she was arrested for sex work. She attended college for a year before dropping out, and later married and became convinced by her mother-in-law to return to school.

After returning to college, she participated in student government, lobbied legislators in Albany, New York on issues related to higher education, and was an organizer against City University of New York tuition increases. During college, she was inspired to become politically active by her coursework and politicians including Bernie Sanders and Alexandria Ocasio-Cortez. She graduated from the John Jay College of Criminal Justice in 2019 with a Bachelor's degree in political science.

== Career ==
From January through May 2019, Crespo interned with the Assembly Speaker, Carl Heastie (D-Bronx) and then interned for the New York City Council as a legislative intern until August 2019. After her graduation, Crespo worked as the education liaison to the Bronx Borough President, Ruben Diaz Jr., with a focus on advocacy for special education students.

In February 2020, Crespo decided to run for the 15th district in the 2021 New York City Council election. During her campaign, she described her overall priority as moving people and the community from "generational poverty to generational wealth." Specific campaign goals included the creation of more affordable housing, a "public option for employment," and more funding for public schools. Crespo advocated for the creation of a government-funded apprenticeship program for unemployed New Yorkers to help develop skills and obtain full-time employment, inspired by the New Deal enacted by United States President Franklin D. Roosevelt. She also advocated for racial justice, criminal justice reforms, improvements in public health, and action to address climate change.

In November 2020, the New York Post published an article about her with a headline calling her an "ex-prostitute." In response, Crespo tweeted it was "shameful for anyone to weaponize transphobic victimization", and that she previously "publicly talked about all of this". Public officials, LGBTQ activists, and allies on social media also expressed support for her and the transgender community. In March 2021, parts of the article were included on a flyer that questioned "sex work experience versus public service," and Crespo responded by promoting awareness of violence against trans people.

Crespo was endorsed by the LGBTQ Victory Fund, the New York Black Lives Caucus, the Bronx chapter of the Sunrise Movement, former New York City Council Speaker Melissa Mark-Viverito, New York City Councilmembers Helen Rosenthal, Antonio Reynoso, Ben Kallos, Jimmy Van Bramer, and Brad Lander, as well as New York State Senators Brad Hoylman, Julia Salazar, and Gustavo Rivera. The special election was held on March 23, 2021, with Crespo eliminated in the eighth round of ranked-choice voting. On April 6, 2021, Crespo announced she would not run in the Democratic primary in June.

In July 2021, Crespo became the Executive Director of the New Pride Agenda, a statewide LGBTQ advocacy organization, with a focus that includes LGBTQ youth, including advocacy for the Dignity for All Students Act to address anti-LGBTQ bullying; sex workers' rights, including advocacy for the Stop Violence in the Sex Trades Act to decriminalize sex work; and advocacy for PrEP access expansion.
