= The Queens Ledger =

Weekly newspaper in New York City

- Type: Weekly Newspaper
- Owner(s): BQE Media
- Founded: 1873
- Language: English
- Headquarters: Maspeth, Queens, New York City, U.S.
- Website: queensledger.com

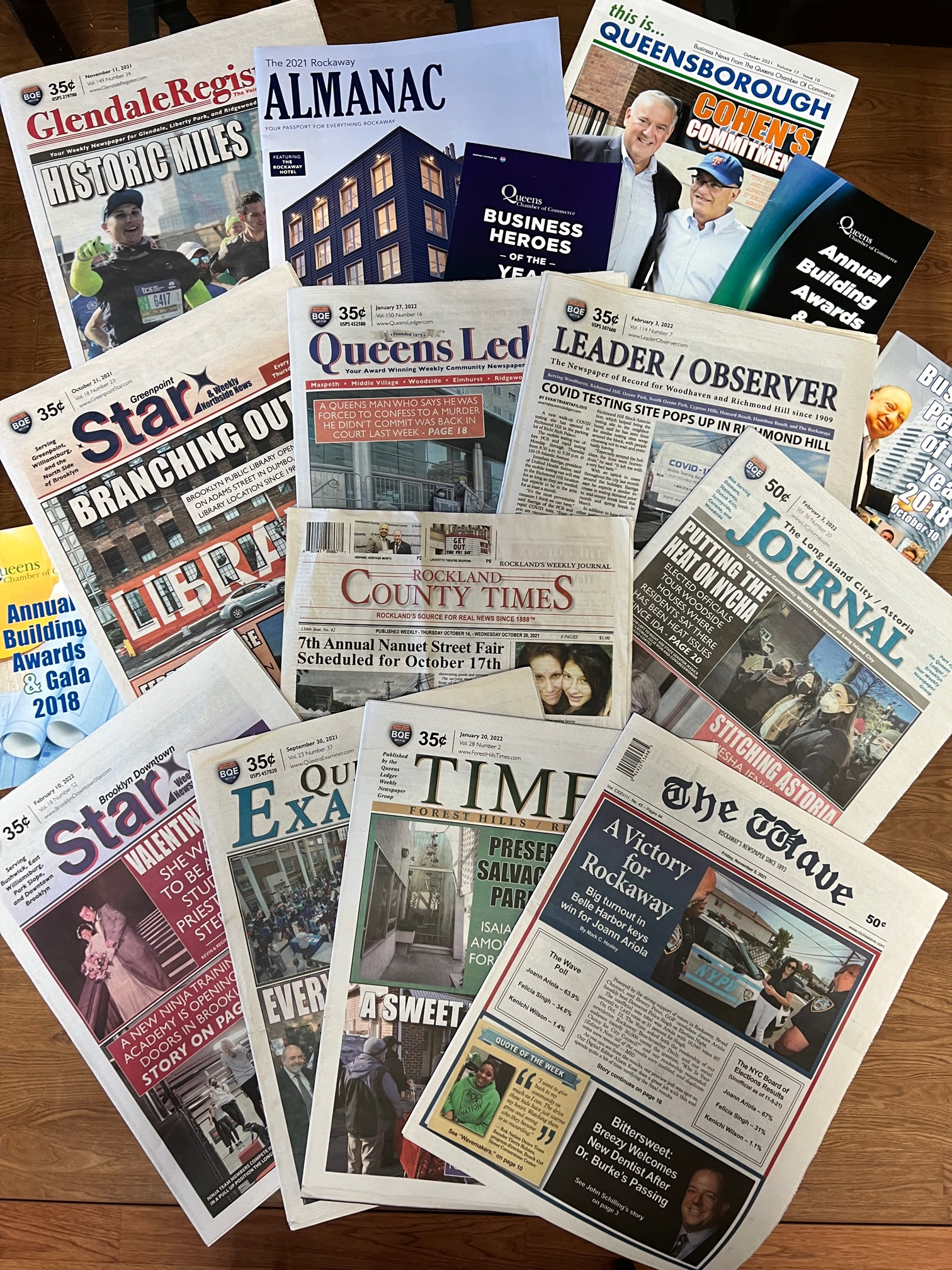
The Queens Ledger and its sister publications in 2022

The Queens Ledger is a weekly newspaper headquartered in the Woodside section of Queens, New York City, for 140-years. The news group publishes eight weekly newspapers, including The Greenpoint Star, Brooklyn Downtown Star, The Leader Observer of Woodhaven, Glendale Register, Astoria/LIC Journal, Forest Hills Times, and Queens Examiner.

The Queens Ledger is published every Thursday on 42 newsstands and serves many areas in Queens, including Maspeth, Middle Village, Woodside, Elmhurst, and Ridgewood. The Queens Ledger printed newspapers have a circulation of 150,000, and is published weekly. Its publisher, since 1986, is Walter H. Sanchez of BQE Media.

== History ==
=== 19th century ===
The Queens Ledger was founded in 1873.

=== 20th century ===
In 1941, The Queen Legister entered into a partnership with the Long Island Register.

=== 21st century ===
In July 2000, Queens Ledger columnist Frank Borzellieri wrote a column comparing Queens representative of the New York Board of Education Terri Thomson to Adolf Hitler.

Borzellieri was originally suspended. Later that year, publisher Walter Sanchez rehired him even though Borzellieri refused to apologize. Sanchez cited his reasoning to many readers expressing their interest in Borzellieri's columns and opinions. Sanchez and the Queens Ledger received a lot of scrutiny, including from the Anti-Defamation League.
