= Joann Ariola =

American politician (born 1958)

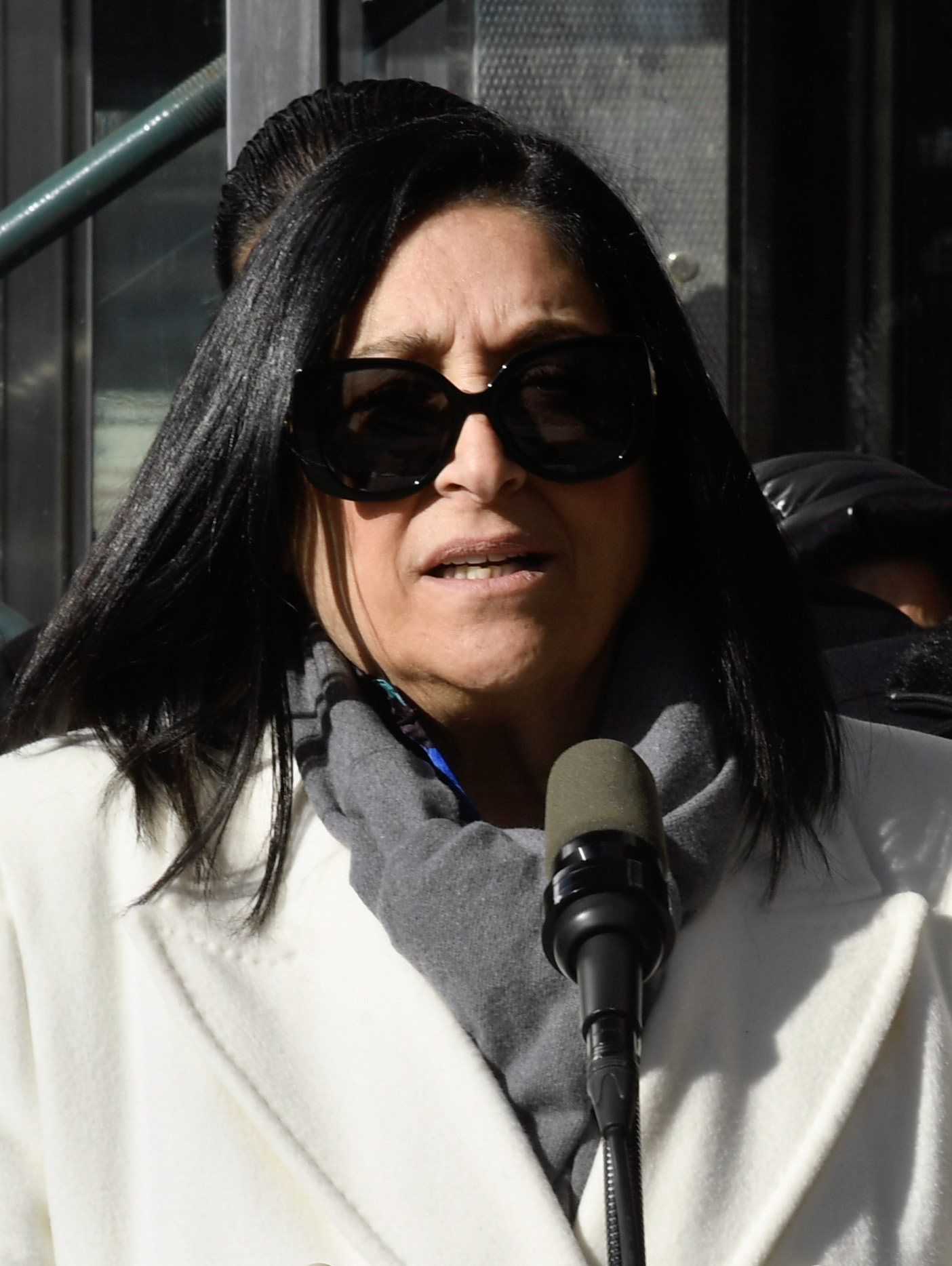
- Ariola in 2025

Minority Leader of the New York City Council
- In office February 7, 2025 – January 7, 2026
- Preceded by: David Carr
- Succeeded by: David Carr

Member of the New York City Council from the 32nd district
- Incumbent
- Assumed office January 1, 2022
- Preceded by: Eric Ulrich

Personal details
- Born: June 14, 1958 (age 68) New York City, New York, U.S.
- Party: Republican
- Education: Adelphi University

Joann Ariola-Shanks (born June 14, 1958) is a councilwoman of the New York City Council, representing District 32 which includes Glendale, Woodhaven, Ozone Park, Howard Beach, Broad Channel, and the western half of the Rockaway Peninsula. She previously served as the chairwoman of the Queens Republican Party.

== Early life ==
Ariola is a lifelong resident of the 32nd Council District. Born on June 14, 1958, Ariola is the eldest child of a prominent Ozone Park, Queens family. During her childhood, the family - including her younger sister and brother - relocated to a new home in Howard Beach. She attended P.S. 63 (Old South), P.S. 207 (Rockwood Park), Our Lady of Grace Catholic School, Stella Maris High School on the Rockaway Peninsula and Adelphi Business School.

== Political career ==
Ariola entered into the political arena in 1993 as chief of staff for New York City Councilmember Alfonso C. Stabile. In 1996, Ariola unsuccessfully ran against Audrey Pheffer for a seat in the New York State Assembly.

Later, Ariola served as communications director for Councilmember Noach Dear, before unsuccessfully running against Joseph Addabbo Jr. in 2001 for the City Council seat left vacant by Stabile.

Following the unsuccessful 2001 race, Ariola worked under the Bloomberg administration as an Assistant Commissioner with the Community Assistance Unit until 2006, when she entered into the private sector as Director of Intergovernmental Relations for Medisys.

=== 2020 Borough President race ===
In 2020, Ariola ran for Queens Borough President against Donovan Richards, losing in the special election with 27.72% of the vote.

=== 2021 City Council race ===
Ariola was elected to the NYC City Council in 2021 over Democrat Felicia Singh. Despite many predicting a close race, she handily defeated Singh 67%-32%.

Ariola was elected minority leader of the New York City Council in February 2025. Joe Borelli resigned from the City Council to work in the private sector. During the private election, Joe Borelli and Inna Vernikov voted for David Carr. Vicky Paladino, Kristy Marmorato, and Ariola did not show up to vote. Speaker Adrienne Adams intervened in the disputed election. After reviewing the rules of the City Council's internal election process, the speaker determined that a re-election had to take place. The last three New York City Council members were present during the meeting and voted for Ariola as their new leader. The first three members did not show up. Ariola was declared the new leader of the Republican caucus.

== Electoral history ==
=== 2025 ===
2025 New York City Council election, District 32
Party	Candidate	Votes	%
Republican	Joann Ariola	24,909	81.8
Conservative	Joann Ariola	4,758	15.6
Total	Joann Ariola (incumbent)	29,667	97.4
Write-in		787	2.6
Total votes		30,454	100.0
Republican hold			

=== 2023 ===
2023 New York City Council election, District 32
Party	Candidate	Votes	%
Republican	Joann Ariola	7,568	80.2
Conservative	Joann Ariola	1,414	15.0
Total	Joann Ariola (incumbent)	8,982	95.1
Write-in		458	4.9
Total votes		9,440	100.0
Republican hold			

=== 2021 ===
2021 New York City Council Republican primary, District 32
Party	Candidate	Votes	%
Republican	Joann Ariola	2,378	82.0
Republican	Stephen A. Sirgiovanni	494	17.0
Write-in		28	1.0
Total votes		2,900	100.0

2021 New York City Council election, District 32
Party	Candidate	Votes	%
Republican	Joann Ariola (Note: Shared with "Save Our City" ballot line.)	15,216	59.5
Conservative	Joann Ariola	1,694	6.6
Total	Joann Ariola	16,910	66.2
Democratic	Felicia Singh	8,322	32.6
Community First	Kenichi Wilson	283	1.1
Write-in		40	0.2
Total votes		25,555	100.0
Republican hold			

=== 2020 ===
2020 Queens borough president special election
Party	Candidate	Votes	%
Democratic	Donovan J. Richards Jr.	518,840	69.8
Republican	Joann Ariola	182,121	24.5
Conservative	Joann Ariola	16,565	2.2
Save Our City	Joann Ariola	7,207	1.0
Total	Joann Ariola	205,893	27.7
Red Dragon	Dao Yin	17,227	2.3
Write-in		870	0.1
Total votes		742,830	100.0
Democratic hold			

=== 2001 ===
2001 New York City Council election, District 32
Party	Candidate	Votes	%
Democratic	Joseph P. Addabbo	15,126	55.1
Republican	Joann Ariola	10,184	37.1
Conservative	Joann Ariola	982	3.6
Working Families	Joann Ariola	326	1.2
Total	Joann Ariola	11,492	41.9
Independence	John J. Baxter	425	1.5
Green	Robert Curran	405	1.5
Write-in		3	0.0
Total votes		27,451	100.0
Democratic gain from Republican			

=== 1996 ===
1996 New York State Assembly election, District 23
Party	Candidate	Votes	%
Democratic	Audrey I. Pheffer	19,121	56.9
Independence	Audrey I. Pheffer	896	2.7
Liberal	Audrey I. Pheffer	810	2.4
Total	Audrey I. Pheffer (incumbent)	20,827	62.0
Republican	Joann Ariola	10,655	31.7
Conservative	Joann Ariola	2,108	6.3
Total	Joann Ariola	12,763	38.0
Total votes		33,590	100.0
Democratic hold			

== Notes ==
Political offices
Preceded by David Carr	Minority Leader of the New York City Council; 2025–2026	Succeeded by David Carr
