= New York's 23rd State Assembly district =

American legislative district

Assemblymember
Stacey Pheffer Amato; D–Rockaway
- Registration: 55.1% Democratic; 20.8% Republican; 20.0% No party preference
- Demographics: 46% White; 16% Black; 24% Hispanic; 10% Asian; 0% Native American; 0% Hawaiian/Pacific Islander; 1% Other; 3% Multiracial
- Population (2020): 139,203
- Registered voters: 79,050

New York's 23rd State Assembly district is one of the 150 districts in the New York State Assembly in the United States. It has been represented by Democrat Stacey Pheffer Amato since 2017. In 2025, she announced that she would not seek re-election in 2026.

== Geography ==
=== 2010s-present ===
District 23 is located in Queens, comprising the neighborhoods of Broad Channel, Howard Beach, and parts of the Rockaways and Ozone Park. Aqueduct Racetrack is also located within the district.

The district overlaps with New York's 5th and 7th congressional districts, the 10th, 15th and 19th districts of the New York State Senate, and the 28th, 31st and 32nd districts of the New York City Council.

== Recent election results ==
=== 2026 ===
2026 New York State Assembly election, District 23
Primary election
Party	Candidate	Votes	%
Democratic	Pesach Osina	3,445	60.6
Democratic	Mike Scala	2,201	38.8
Write-in		34	0.6
Total votes		5,680	100.0
General election
Democratic	Pesach Osina		
Community First	Pesach Osina		
Total	Pesach Osina		
Republican	Thomas Sullivan		
Conservative	Thomas Sullivan		
We the People	Thomas Sullivan		
Total	Thomas Sullivan		
Write-in			
Total votes			100.0

=== 2024 ===
2024 New York State Assembly election, District 23
Party	Candidate	Votes	%
Democratic	Stacey Pheffer Amato	23,133	
We the People	Stacey Pheffer Amato	1,102	
Total	Stacey Pheffer Amato (incumbent)	24,235	51.6
Republican	Thomas Sullivan	20,658	
Conservative	Thomas Sullivan	1,733	
Common Sense	Thomas Sullivan	276	
Total	Thomas Sullivan	22,667	48.2
Write-in		92	0.2
Total votes		46,994	100.0
Democratic hold			

=== 2022 ===
2022 New York State Assembly election, District 23
Party	Candidate	Votes	%
Democratic	Stacey Pheffer Amato	15,412	
We the People	Stacey Pheffer Amato	773	
Total	Stacey Pheffer Amato (incumbent)	16,185	50.0
Republican	Thomas Sullivan	14,800	
Conservative	Thomas Sullivan	1,370	
Total	Thomas Sullivan	16,170	49.9
Write-in		19	0.1
Total votes		32,374	100.0
Democratic hold			

=== 2020 ===
2020 New York State Assembly election, District 23
Party	Candidate	Votes	%
Democratic	Stacey Pheffer Amato (incumbent)	29,065	61.5
Republican	Peter Hatzipetros	16,153	
Conservative	Peter Hatzipetros	1,574	
Save Our City	Peter Hatzipetros	406	
Total	Peter Hatzipetros	18,133	38.4
Write-in		42	0.1
Total votes		47,240	100.0
Democratic hold			

=== 2018 ===
2018 New York State Assembly election, District 23
Party	Candidate	Votes	%
Democratic	Stacey Pheffer Amato	18,916	
Working Families	Stacey Pheffer Amato	729	
Independence	Stacey Pheffer Amato	512	
Total	Stacey Pheffer Amato (incumbent)	20,157	68.1
Republican	Matthew Pecorino	9,431	31.9
Write-in		17	0.6
Total votes		29,605	100.0
Democratic hold			

=== 2016 ===
2016 New York State Assembly election, District 23
Party	Candidate	Votes	%
Democratic	Stacey Pheffer Amato	25,313	
Working Families	Stacey Pheffer Amato	1,340	
Women's Equality	Stacey Pheffer Amato	389	
Total	Stacey Pheffer Amato	27,042	67.8
Republican	Alan Zwirn	16,153	
Conservative	Alan Zwirn	1,574	
Reform	Alan Zwirn	120	
Total	Alan Zwirn	12,836	32.2
Write-in		34	0.9
Total votes		39,912	100.0
Democratic hold			

=== 2014 ===
2014 New York State Assembly election, District 23
Party	Candidate	Votes	%
Democratic	Phil Goldfeder	10,137	
Conservative	Phil Goldfeder	3,742	
Total	Phil Goldfeder (incumbent)	13,879	99.6
Write-in		56	0.4
Total votes		13,935	100.0
Democratic hold			

=== 2012 ===
2012 New York State Assembly election, District 23
Party	Candidate	Votes	%
Democratic	Phil Goldfeder	14,279	
Conservative	Phil Goldfeder	2,472	
Independence	Phil Goldfeder	615	
Total	Phil Goldfeder (incumbent)	17,366	99.8
Write-in		43	0.2
Total votes		17,409	100.0
Democratic hold			

=== 2011 special ===
Incumbent Audrey Pheffer resigned her seat on March 23, 2011 after being appointed to the position of County Clerk of Queens County, triggering a special election. In special elections for state legislative offices, primaries are usually not held – county committee members and district leaders for each party select nominees. Election was held on September 13, 2011.

2011 New York State Assembly special election, District 23
Party	Candidate	Votes	%
Democratic	Phil Goldfeder	8,196	
Independence	Phil Goldfeder	363	
Working Families	Phil Goldfeder	326	
Total	Phil Goldfeder	8,885	55.7
Republican	Jane Deacy	5,708	
Conservative	Jane Deacy	1,311	
Total	Jane Deacy	7,019	44.0
Write-in		52	0.3
Total votes		15,956	100.0
Democratic hold			

=== 2010 ===
2010 New York State Assembly election, District 23
Party	Candidate	Votes	%
Democratic	Audrey Pheffer	14,008	
Independence	Audrey Pheffer	947	
Working Families	Audrey Pheffer	602	
Total	Audrey Pheffer (incumbent)	15,557	67.3
Republican	Harold Paez	6,344	
Conservative	Harold Paez	1,206	
Total	Harold Paez	7,550	32.6
Write-in		21	0.1
Total votes		23,128	100.0
Democratic hold			

=== 2008 ===
2008 New York State Assembly election, District 23
Party	Candidate	Votes	%
Democratic	Audrey Pheffer	21,276	
Working Families	Audrey Pheffer	1,279	
Total	Audrey Pheffer (incumbent)	22,555	67.7
Republican	Gerald Sullivan	9,071	
Conservative	Gerald Sullivan	1,090	
Independence	Gerald Sullivan	582	
Total	Gerald Sullivan	10,743	32.3
Write-in		1	0.0
Total votes		33,299	100.0
Democratic hold			

=== 2006 ===
2006 New York State Assembly election, District 23
Party	Candidate	Votes	%
Democratic	Audrey Pheffer	13,580	
Working Families	Audrey Pheffer	893	
Total	Audrey Pheffer (incumbent)	14,473	76.9
Republican	Stuart Mirsky	3,504	
Conservative	Stuart Mirsky	646	
Independence	Stuart Mirsky	199	
Total	Stuart Mirsky	4,349	23.1
Write-in		2	0.0
Total votes		18,824	100.0
Democratic hold			

=== 2004 ===
2004 New York State Assembly election, District 23
Party	Candidate	Votes	%
Democratic	Audrey Pheffer	21,287	
Working Families	Audrey Pheffer	1,531	
Total	Audrey Pheffer (incumbent)	22,818	100.0
Write-in		2	0.0
Total votes		22,820	100.0
Democratic hold			

=== 2002 ===
2002 New York State Assembly election, District 23
Party	Candidate	Votes	%
Democratic	Audrey Pheffer	12,165	
Working Families	Audrey Pheffer	503	
Liberal	Audrey Pheffer	468	
Total	Audrey Pheffer (incumbent)	13,136	94.9
Independence	Kenneth Huhn	713	5.1
Write-in		0	0.0
Total votes		13,849	100.0
Democratic hold			

=== 2000 ===
2000 New York State Assembly election, District 23
Party	Candidate	Votes	%
Democratic	Audrey Pheffer	22,492	
Working Families	Audrey Pheffer	722	
Liberal	Audrey Pheffer	610	
Total	Audrey Pheffer (incumbent)	23,824	72.5
Republican	Anthony Stasi	7,904	
Conservative	Anthony Stasi	1,143	
Total	Anthony Stasi	9,047	27.5
Write-in		2	0.0
Total votes		32,873	100.0
Democratic hold			

=== Federal results in Assembly District 23 ===
Year	Office	Results
2024	President	Trump 56.0 - 42.7%
2024	Senate	Sapraicone 52.9 - 46.5%
2022	Senate	Pinion 56.7 - 43.0%
2020	President	Biden 51.6 - 47.3%
2018	Senate	Gillibrand 60.9 - 39.1%
2016	President	Clinton 53.0 – 44.1%
2016	Senate	Schumer 72.5 – 26.1%
2012	President	Obama 61.8 - 37.4%
2012	Senate	Gillibrand 72.0 - 27.1%
