= New York's 15th State Senate district =

American legislative district

Senator
Joseph Addabbo Jr. D–Ozone Park
- Registration: 53.5% Democratic; 19.8% Republican; 22.4% No party preference
- Demographics: 53% White; 3% Black; 27% Hispanic; 14% Asian
- Population (2017): 339,492
- Registered voters: 186,014

New York's 15th State Senate district is one of 63 districts in the New York State Senate. It has been represented by Democrat Joseph Addabbo Jr. since 2009, following his defeat of longtime Republican incumbent Serphin Maltese.

== Geography ==
=== 2020s ===
District 15 covers central and southern Queens, including most of the neighborhoods of Glendale, Middle Village, Richmond Hill and Woodhaven as well as portions of Ozone Park, South Ozone Park, Ridgewood, Lindenwood, and Rego Park.

The district overlaps with New York's 5th, 6th and 7th congressional districts, the 23rd, 24th, 28th, 30th, 31st, 35th, 38th, and 39th districts of the New York State Assembly, and the 24th, 28th, 29th, 30th and 32nd districts of the New York City Council.

=== 2010s ===
District 15 covers a large swath of central and southeastern Queens, including the neighborhoods of Howard Beach, Ozone Park, Woodhaven, Glendale, Middle Village, and Maspeth, as well as parts of South Ozone Park, Ridgewood, Woodside and The Rockaways.

The district overlaps with New York's 5th, 6th, 7th, 8th, 12th, and 14th congressional districts, and with the 23rd, 25th, 27th, 28th, 30th, 31st, 34th, 37th, 38th, and 39th districts of the New York State Assembly.

== Recent election results ==
=== 2026 ===
2026 New York State Senate election, District 15
Primary election
Party	Candidate	Votes	%
Democratic	Joseph Addabbo Jr. (incumbent)	7,822	73.6
Democratic	Albert Baldeo	2,752	25.9
Write-in		60	0.6
Total votes		10,634	100.0
General election
Democratic	Joseph Addabbo Jr. (incumbent)		
Conservative	Danniel Maio		
Write-in			
Total votes			100.0

=== 2024 ===
2024 New York State Senate election, District 15
Party	Candidate	Votes	%
Democratic	Joseph Addabbo Jr. (incumbent)	53,113	76.5
Conservative	Danniel Maio	15,972	23.0
Write-in		348	0.5
Total votes		69,433	100.0
Democratic hold			

=== 2022 ===
2022 New York State Senate election, District 15
Primary election
Party	Candidate	Votes	%
Democratic	Joseph Addabbo Jr. (incumbent)	4,072	53.7
Democratic	Japneet Singh	2,450	32.3
Democratic	Albert Baldeo	1,021	13.5
Write-in		37	0.5
Total votes		7,580	100.0
General election
Democratic	Joseph Addabbo Jr.	29,646	
We the People	Joseph Addabbo Jr.	748	
Total	Joseph Addabbo Jr. (incumbent)	30,394	57.3
Republican	Danniel Maio	20,769	
Conservative	Danniel Maio	1,472	
Independence	Danniel Maio	342	
Medical Freedom	Danniel Maio	60	
Total	Danniel Maio	22,643	42.6
Write-in		72	0.1
Total votes		53,109	100.0
Democratic hold			

=== 2020 ===
2020 New York State Senate election, District 15
Party	Candidate	Votes	%
Democratic	Joseph Addabbo Jr. (incumbent)	68,829	58.2
Republican	Thomas Sullivan	44,108	
Conservative	Thomas Sullivan	3,980	
Save Our City	Thomas Sullivan	1,218	
Total	Thomas Sullivan	49,306	41.7
Write-in		109	0.1
Total votes		118,244	100.0
Democratic hold			

=== 2018 ===
2018 New York State Senate election, District 15
Primary election
Party	Candidate	Votes	%
Republican	Thomas Sullivan	3,377	67.3
Republican	Slawomir Platta	1,602	31.9
Write-in		38	0.8
Total votes		5,017	100.0
Reform	Thomas Sullivan	73	25.6
Reform	Slawomir Platta	36	12.6
Write-in		176	61.8
Total votes		285	100.0
General election
Democratic	Joseph Addabbo Jr.	44,706	
Working Families	Joseph Addabbo Jr.	2,262	
Total	Joseph Addabbo Jr. (incumbent)	46,968	64.1
Republican	Thomas Sullivan	22,729	
Conservative	Thomas Sullivan	2,762	
Independence	Thomas Sullivan	611	
Reform	Thomas Sullivan	179	
Total	Thomas Sullivan	26,281	36.8
Write-in		109	0.1
Total votes		73,302	100.0
Democratic hold			

=== 2016 ===
2016 New York State Senate election, District 15
Party	Candidate	Votes	%
Democratic	Joseph Addabbo Jr.	60,102	
Women's Equality	Joseph Addabbo Jr.	2,358	
Total	Joseph Addabbo Jr. (incumbent)	62,460	63.6
Republican	Michael Conigliaro	30,829	
Conservative	Michael Conigliaro	4,113	
Reform	Michael Conigliaro	749	
Total	Michael Conigliaro	35,691	36.3
Write-in		61	0.1
Total votes		98,212	100.0
Democratic hold			

=== 2014 ===
2014 New York State Senate election, District 15
Party	Candidate	Votes	%
Democratic	Joseph Addabbo Jr. (incumbent)	20,924	55.3
Republican	Michael Conigliaro	13,600	
Conservative	Michael Conigliaro	3,277	
Total	Michael Conigliaro	16,877	44.6
Write-in		61	0.1
Total votes		37,836	100.0
Democratic hold			

=== 2012 ===
2012 New York State Senate election, District 15
Primary election
Party	Candidate	Votes	%
Republican	Eric Ulrich	2,984	69.6
Republican	Juan Reyes	1,298	30.3
Write-in		8	0.1
Total votes		4,290	100.0
Independence	Eric Ulrich	98	82.4
Independence	Joseph Tiraco	21	17.6
Write-in		0	0.0
Total votes		119	100.0
General election
Democratic	Joseph Addabbo Jr.	40,456	
Working Families	Joseph Addabbo Jr.	1,734	
Total	Joseph Addabbo Jr. (incumbent)	42,190	57.6
Republican	Eric Ulrich	26,954	
Conservative	Eric Ulrich	2,917	
Independence	Eric Ulrich	1,165	
Total	Eric Ulrich	31,036	42.4
Write-in		52	0.0
Total votes		73,278	100.0
Democratic hold			

=== Federal results in District 15 ===
Year	Office	Results
2020	President	Biden 53.2 – 45.6%
2016	President	Clinton 55.3 – 41.9%
2012	President	Obama 59.8 – 39.1%
2012	Senate	Gillibrand 70.5 – 28.2%
