= New York City's 32nd City Council district =

- Boundaries following the 2020 census

Government
  - Councilmember: . Joann Ariola. R–Howard Beach

Population (2010)
  - Total: 163,306

Demographics
  - White: 38%
  - Hispanic: 30%
  - Asian: 15%
  - Black: 8%
  - Other: 8%

Registration
  - Democratic: 56.0%
  - Republican: 18.2%
  - No party preference: 21.7%
- Registered voters (2021) 97,851

New York City's 32nd City Council district is one of 51 districts in the New York City Council. It has been represented by Republican Joann Ariola since 2022. She replaced Eric Ulrich, who was term limited in 2021 and could not seek re-election. Until 2021, it was the only district in the city outside of Staten Island to be represented by a Republican.

== Geography ==
District 32 is based in a geographically splintered set of neighborhoods centered around Jamaica Bay, covering parts of southeastern Queens, the western half of the Rockaways, and the islands in between the two. Communities within the district include Howard Beach, Ozone Park, Belle Harbor, Breezy Point, Broad Channel, Rockaway Park, Neponsit, Roxbury, and parts of South Ozone Park, Richmond Hill, and Woodhaven. Jacob Riis Park, Fort Tilden, Breezy Point Tip, Spring Creek Park, and most of Jamaica Bay Wildlife Refuge are also located within the district.

The district overlaps with Queens Community Boards 9, 10, and 14, and with New York's 5th, 6th, 7th, and 8th congressional districts. It also overlaps with the 10th, 12th, and 15th districts of the New York State Senate, and with the 23rd, 28th, 31st, and 38th districts of the New York State Assembly.

== List of members representing the district ==
Members	Party	Years served	Electoral history
District established January 1, 1974
Howard Golden (Bensonhurst)	Democratic	January 1, 1974 – December 4, 1976	Redistricted from the 25th district and re-elected in 1973. Re-elected in 1974. Resigned to become Brooklyn Borough President.
Vacant		December 4, 1976 – December 7, 1976	
Edward M. Rappaport (Kensington)	Democratic	December 7, 1976 – December 31, 1977	Appointed to finish Golden's term. Lost renomination.
Susan Alter (East Flatbush)	Democratic	January 1, 1978 – December 31, 1982	Elected in 1977. Redistricted to the 25th district.
Noach Dear (Borough Park)	Democratic	January 1, 1983 – December 31, 1991	Elected in 1982. Re-elected in 1985. Re-elected in 1989. Redistricted to the 44th district.
Walter Ward (Howard Beach)	Democratic	January 1, 1992 – December 31, 1993	Redistricted from the 17th district and re-elected in 1991. Lost re-election.
Alfonso C. Stabile (Howard Beach)	Republican	January 1, 1994 – December 31, 2001	Elected in 1993. Re-elected in 1997. Termed out and ran for Queens Borough President.
Joseph Addabbo Jr. (Ozone Park)	Democratic	January 1, 2002 – December 31, 2008	Elected in 2001. Re-elected in 2003. Re-elected in 2005. Resigned when elected to the New York State Senate.
Vacant		December 31, 2008 – February 24, 2009	
Eric Ulrich (Ozone Park)	Republican	February 24, 2009 – December 31, 2020	Elected to finish Addabbo's term. Re-elected in 2009. Re-elected in 2013. Re-elected in 2017. Termed out.
Joann Ariola (Howard Beach)	Republican	January 1, 2021 –	Elected in 2021. Re-elected in 2023. Re-elected in 2025.

== Recent election results ==
=== 2025 ===
2025 New York City Council election, District 32
Party	Candidate	Votes	%
Republican	Joann Ariola	24,909	
Conservative	Joann Ariola	4,758	
Total	Joann Ariola (incumbent)	29,667	97.4
Write-in		787	2.6
Total votes		30,454	100.0
Republican hold			

=== 2023 (redistricting) ===
Due to redistricting and the 2020 changes to the New York City Charter, councilmembers elected during the 2021 and 2023 City Council elections will serve two-year terms, with full four-year terms resuming after the 2025 New York City Council elections.

2023 New York City Council election, District 32
Party	Candidate	Votes	%
Republican	Joann Ariola	7,568	
Conservative	Joann Ariola	1,414	
Total	Joann Ariola (incumbent)	8,982	95.1
Write-in		458	4.9
Total votes		9,440	100.0
Republican hold			

=== 2021 ===
In 2019, voters in New York City approved Ballot Question 1, which implemented ranked-choice voting in all local elections. Under the new system, voters have the option to rank up to five candidates for every local office. Voters whose first-choice candidates fare poorly will have their votes redistributed to other candidates in their ranking until one candidate surpasses the 50 percent threshold. If one candidate surpasses 50 percent in first-choice votes, then ranked-choice tabulations will not occur.

2021 New York City Council election, District 32 Democratic primary
Party	Candidate	Maximum round	Maximum votes	Share in maximum round	Maximum votes First round votes Transfer votes
Democratic	Felicia Singh	3	4,686	52.5%	
Democratic	Mike Scala	3	4,248	47.5%	
Democratic	Helal Sheikh	2	1,100	10.8%	
Democratic	Bella Matias	2	817	8.0%	
Democratic	Kaled Alamarie	2	702	6.9%	
Democratic	Shaeleigh Severino	2	261	2.6%	
Write-in		1	163	1.6%	

An interactive map of District 32

2021 New York City Council election, District 32 Republican primary & general election
Primary election
Party	Candidate	Votes	%
Republican	Joann Ariola	2,378	82.0
Republican	Steve Sirgiovanni	494	17.0
Write-in		28	1.0
Total votes		2,900	100
General election
Republican	Joann Ariola	15,216	
Conservative	Joann Ariola	1,694	
Total	Joann Ariola	16,910	66.2
Democratic	Felicia Singh	8,322	32.6
Community First	Kenichi Wilson	283	1.1
Write-in		40	0.1
Total votes		25,555	100
Republican hold			

==== Endorsements ====
Joann Ariola (R)

U.S. Representatives

- Nicole Malliotakis, US Representative from New York's 11th congressional district (2021–present), former NY State Assemblymember for the 64th district (2013–2020) and the 60th district (2011–2012), and nominee for mayor in 2017

State Legislators

- Phil Goldfeder, Former Member of the New York State Assembly from the 23rd district (Democratic)

Local Officials

- Eric Ulrich, Member of the New York City Council from the 32nd district
- Robert Holden, Member of the New York City Council from the 30th district (Democratic)
- Danny Ruscillo, NYPD Community Parter for the 100th Precinct
- Joe Fox, Former Chief of Transit for the NYPD
- Augustus Agate, Former New York Supreme Court 11th Judicial District (Democratic)
- Romeo Hitlall, President of the Richmond Hill-South Ozone Park Lions Club (Democratic)

Labor Unions

- Police Benevolent Association
- NYC District Council of Carpenters
- Sergeants Benevolent Association
- Lieutenants Benevolent Association
- Correction Officers' Benevolent Association
- New York State Supreme Court Officers’ Association
- New York State Court Officers’ Association
- LIUNA NY
- Uniformed Firefighters Association
- Teamsters Local 814
- N.Y.C. District Council of Carpenters
- Uniformed Sanitationmen's Association - Local 831
- Steamfitters - Local 638
- Plumbers - Local 1
- Detectives' Endowment Association
- International Union of Operating Engineers

Individuals

- Patrick Lynch, President of the Police Benevolent Association

Organizations

- Sant Baba Prem Singh Sikh Cultural Society of New York

Newspapers

- Queens Chronicle
- New York Daily News
- New York Post
- Leader–Observer
- The Wave
Felicia Singh (D)

U.S. Senators

- Chuck Schumer, Senate Majority Leader and U.S. Senator from New York
- Kirsten Gillibrand, U.S. Senator from New York

U.S. Representatives

- Alexandria Ocasio-Cortez, Member of the U.S. House of Representatives from New York's 14th district

State Officials

- Kathy Hochul, 57th Governor of New York
- Letitia James, Attorney General of New York

State Legislators

- Catalina Cruz, Member of the New York State Assembly from the 39th district
- Jessica Ramos, Member of the New York State Senate from the 13th district
- Andrew Hevesi, Member of the New York State Assembly from the 28th district
- Khaleel Anderson, Member of the New York State Assembly from the 31st district

Local Officials

- Donovan Richards, Queens Borough President
- Jumaane Williams, New York City Public Advocate
- Selvena Brooks-Powers, New York City Councilmember from the 31st district
- Ravinder Bhalla, mayor of Hoboken, New Jersey, and New Jersey's first Sikh mayor
- Costa Constantinides, former NYC councilman from the 22nd district

Organizations

- Working Families Party
- Sunrise Movement
- Our Revolution
- Courage to Change
- Run for Something
- Citizen Action of New York
- New York Communities for Change
- Stonewall Democratic Club of New York City
- Working Families Party
- The Jewish Vote

Labor unions

- Communications Workers of America, District 1
- District Council 37
- SEIU 32BJ

Individuals

- Zephyr Teachout, attorney and political candidate

Newspapers

- Queens Ledger

=== 2017 ===
2017 New York City Council election, District 32
Primary election
Party	Candidate	Votes	%
Democratic	Mike Scala	2,319	43.6
Democratic	Helal Sheikh	1,587	29.9
Democratic	William Ruiz	1,329	25.0
Write-in		78	1.5
Total votes		5,313	100
General election
Republican	Eric Ulrich	12,607	
Conservative	Eric Ulrich	2,037	
Independence	Eric Ulrich	624	
Reform	Eric Ulrich	162	
Total	Eric Ulrich (incumbent)	15,430	65.6
Democratic	Mike Scala	8,037	34.2
Write-in		40	0.2
Total votes		23,507	100
Republican hold			

=== 2013 ===
2013 New York City Council election, District 32
Primary election
Party	Candidate	Votes	%
Democratic	Lew Simon	4,135	65.7
Democratic	William Ruiz	2,158	34.3
Write-in		3	0.0
Total votes		6,296	100
General election
Republican	Eric Ulrich	8,512	
Conservative	Eric Ulrich	1,478	
Independence	Eric Ulrich	498	
Total	Eric Ulrich (incumbent)	10,488	53.6
Democratic	Lew Simon	9,080	46.4
Write-in		13	0.1
Total votes		19,581	100
Republican hold			

=== 2009 general ===
2009 New York City Council election, District 32
Party	Candidate	Votes	%
Republican	Eric Ulrich	9,829	
Independence	Eric Ulrich	1,280	
Conservative	Eric Ulrich	1,260	
Total	Eric Ulrich (incumbent)	12,369	58.7
Democratic	Frank Gulluscio	8,246	
Working Families	Frank Gulluscio	441	
Total	Frank Gulluscio	8,687	41.3
Write-in		0	0.0
Total votes		21,056	100
Republican gain from Democratic			

=== 2009 special ===
2009 New York City Council special election, District 32
Party	Candidate	Votes	%
People First	Eric Ulrich	3,549	44.5
Good Government	Lew Simon	2,555	32.1
Community First	Geraldine Chapey	920	11.5
Voice of the People	Mike Riccato	729	9.2
Write-in	Glenn Diresto	183	2.3
Write-in		31	0.4
Total votes		7,967	100
