= Bluevine =

American financial services company

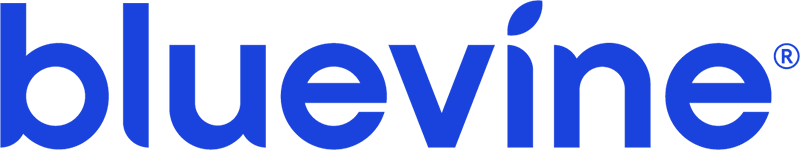
- Type: Private
- Industry: Fintech; Financial Services
- Founded: 2013; 13 years ago
- Founders: Eyal Lifshitz (CEO); Nir Klar (CTO)
- Headquarters: Jersey City, New Jersey, United States
- Area served: United States
- Products: Business loans, banking services
- Number of employees: 500+ (2024)
- Website: bluevine.com

Bluevine is an American financial technology company that offers financial services to small and medium businesses in the United States. The company was founded in 2013 and is headquartered in Jersey City, New Jersey.

Originally an invoice factoring company, Bluevine has since shifted its offerings to include business lending and checking.

== History ==
Eyal Lifshitz and Nir Klar founded Bluevine as an online-only business financing company headquartered in Palo Alto, California, in 2013. Their business model was designed to disrupt small business lending by using machine learning algorithms to speed up risk assessment and invoice factoring to deliver loans faster than competitors. In April 2016, Bluevine expanded its product line to include a business line of credit through Celtic Bank.

By 2019, Bluevine had moved its headquarters to Redwood City, California. That year, Bluevine announced an FDIC-insured business checking account and Mastercard debit card. They subsequently raised another $102.5 million in funding, for a total of over $240 million.

In 2020, Bluevine offered expedited applications for Paycheck Protection Program (PPP) loans, which were established by the CARES Act. Bluevine was one of the top lenders by application volume, up until the PPP program expired in June 2021.

In December 2022, the United States House Select Subcommittee on the Coronavirus Pandemic released a report on several fintech companies over their roles in approving potentially fraudulent PPP loan applications. The report claimed that fintech companies “faced challenges in properly administering the program,” and that Bluevine reduced PPP fraud by implementing new software, manual reviews, and continuous review by Celtic Bank and Cross River Bank.

Bluevine moved its headquarters again to Jersey City, New Jersey in 2023. An opening ceremony was held on January 10, attended by Jersey City Mayor Steven Fulop and New Jersey Secretary of State Tahesha Way.

Valley National Bancorp announced on September 28, 2026, that it would be acquiring Bluevine for $340 million, and that Lifshitz would join Valley National as head of Small Business Banking when the transaction closes in 2027.

== Business and products ==
Lifshitz has stated that he founded Bluevine to offer financial products to small businesses, which he saw as a gap in the financial services market. While Bluevine was founded as an invoice factoring platform, the company later expanded its scope to provide multiple financial services on one platform, which came to include business lines of credit and checking accounts.

Starting September 2023, Bluevine expanded its FDIC insurance to cover up to $3 million for its checking accounts. In November 2023, Bluevine announced a high-interest checking account. In May 2025, Bluevine added invoicing and payment links via a partnership with Stripe.
