= Walter Ward (politician) =

American politician

Member of the New York City Council
- In office April 10, 1968 – December 31, 1993
- Preceded by: John J. Santucci
- Succeeded by: Alfonso C. Stabile
- Constituency: 17th district (1968–1969); 32nd district (1969–1991); 32nd district (1991–1993)

Personal details
- Born: January 1, 1911
- Died: November 8, 1994 (aged 83) Queens, New York, U.S.
- Party: Democratic Party
- Children: 1

Walter Ward (January 1, 1911 – November 8, 1994) was a member of the New York City Council for a quarter of a century, serving 13 terms from 1968 until 1993. Ward, who took courses at the Dale Carnegie Institute, was the owner of the Ward Advertising Company, which specialized in outdoor signs. Ward sold the business in 1971 to devote himself solely to representing the 32nd district of the City Council, which incorporated Broad Channel, Howard Beach, Ozone Park, South Ozone Park, and the Rockaways. Towards the end of his tenure, Ward was the oldest member of the legislative body, and had earned the unofficial title "Dean of the Council."

Throughout his 25 years in office, Ward worked ardently for clean beaches and against airplane noise, issues at the heart of his constituency near the coast and around John F. Kennedy International Airport. Ward became chairman of the City Council Committee of Parks, Recreation and Cultural Affairs, and a member of the council's General Welfare Committee. Ward also cast one of the deciding electoral votes for President John F. Kennedy (1917–1963) after being named a Democratic elector for New York State in the 1960 presidential election. Ward continued to be involved in Democratic politics until his death, serving as Democratic District Leader in Queens after being defeated in the 1993 City Council election.

In addition to his political activities, Ward served on various community boards and organizations, such as the 101st Precinct Community and Youth Council, the Ozone Howard Little League, and the Wyckoff Heights Hospital Advisory Board. Ward died of cancer on November 8, 1994, at the age of 83.

PS 232 in Lindenwood and the playground for PS 207 in Rockwood Park have been named in his honor.

Political offices
Preceded by John J. Santucci	New York City Council, 17th district 1968–1973	Succeeded by Archie Spigner
Preceded by Donald Manes	New York City Council, 15th district 1974–1991	Succeeded by Jose Rivera
Preceded by Noach Dear	New York City Council, 32nd district 1992–1993	Succeeded by Al C. Stabile
