= Eric Ulrich =

American politician (born 1985)

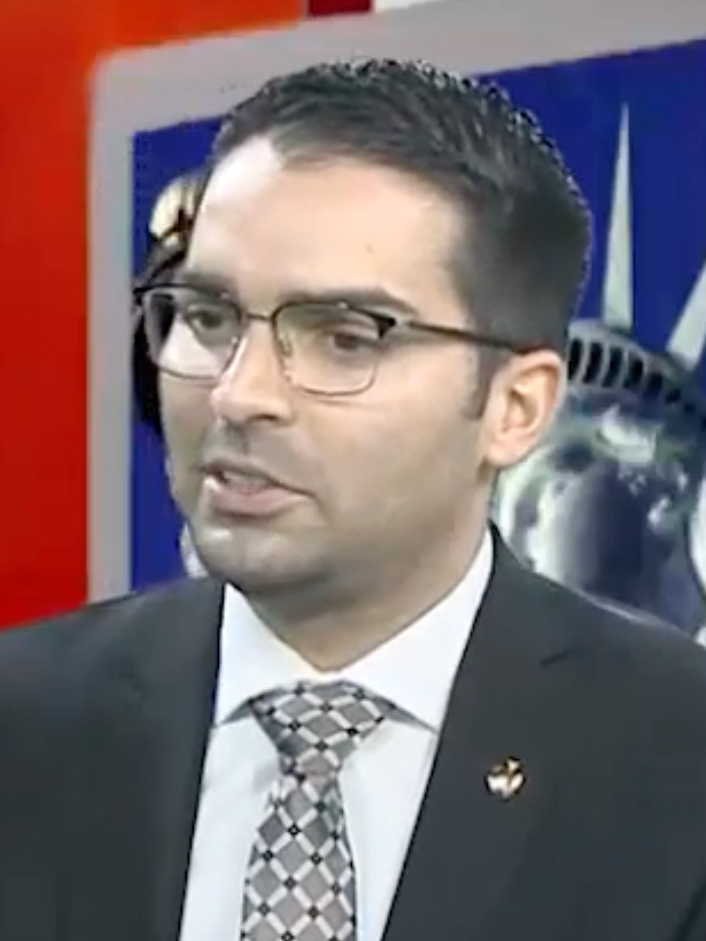
- Ulrich in 2019

Commissioner of the New York City Department of Buildings
- In office May 3, 2022 – November 3, 2022
- Mayor: Eric Adams
- Preceded by: Melanie La Rocca
- Succeeded by: James Oddo

Senior Advisor to the Mayor
- In office January 5, 2022 – May 3, 2022
- Mayor: Eric Adams
- Preceded by: Gabrielle Fialkoff
- Succeeded by: Diane Savino

Member of the New York City Council from the 32nd district
- In office February 24, 2009 – December 31, 2021
- Preceded by: Joseph Addabbo Jr.
- Succeeded by: Joann Ariola

Personal details
- Born: February 13, 1985 (age 41) Ozone Park, New York, U.S.
- Party: Republican
- Education: St. Francis College (BA); Baruch College (MPA)

Eric Ulrich (born February 13, 1985) is an American politician from the state of New York. A Republican, Ulrich represented the 32nd district on the New York City Council from 2009 to 2021. In 2022, he served as New York City Buildings Commissioner and as senior advisor to Democratic New York City Mayor Eric Adams. He resigned in the midst of the investigations into the Eric Adams administration. On September 13, 2023, Ulrich was arrested on 16 felony corruption charges; he pleaded not guilty.

== Early life and education ==
Eric Ulrich was born at Jamaica Hospital on February 13, 1985. He grew up in Ozone Park in Queens, graduating from Cathedral Prep. Seminary High School. Ulrich holds a BA from St. Francis College and received his MPA in 2016 from Baruch College, City University of New York.

== Career ==
=== New York City Council ===
In February 2009, during a special election, Ulrich, who had just turned 24 years of age, was elected to a seat on the New York City Council, defeating three more senior candidates in the 32nd district in southwest Queens. Ulrich was re-elected in November 2009, in 2013, and in 2017. He was barred by term limits from seeking re-election in 2021.

Ulrich is a moderate Republican. He broke with the New York State Republican Party platform on several issues, and stated that he was proud of his independence. He voted in favor of a minimum wage raise and voted twice to boost rent stabilization.

Ulrich supported Melissa Mark-Viverito during her run for Council Speaker in 2013, an unpopular position for Republicans. Queens Republican Chair Bob Turner said that supporting Viverito "wouldn't help" Ulrich's standing in Republican circles. Previously, Ulrich had chided Mark-Viverito for refusing to recite the Pledge of Allegiance with other councilmembers during government functions; Mark-Viverito changed her position on the pledge in 2013 prior to her run for Speaker.

Ulrich started a committee with Mark Treyger to monitor the recovery effort following Hurricane Sandy. He criticized the speed and efficiency of Hurricane Sandy relief efforts. Ulrich's constituents resided in parts of the Rockaway Peninsula and Howard Beach which were disproportionately affected by the storm. In public statements, Ulrich called the relief efforts a "bureaucratic nightmare", said the city's chosen contractors were incapable of handling the residents' needs, and recommended the head of the city's Build-it-Back program be fired by the Mayor.

For fiscal year 2015, Ulrich secured a $400,000 allocation to support local veterans' direct services. He supports the consolidation of the city's three library systems.

==== Chair of New York Council Veterans Committee ====
Ulrich served as Chair of the New York City Council's Veterans Committee. Following her election to Council Speaker (in which she had received support from Ulrich), Melissa Mark-Viverito appointed Ulrich to the Veterans Affairs post. Ulrich refuted speculation that his support for Viverito was a quid pro quo for obtaining his Committee Chairmanship, and instead said that supporting her was his best option for bringing her attention to the needs of his constituents.

Following remarks by presidential candidate Donald Trump that John McCain was not a war hero, Ulrich rejected his comments, calling them "a slap in the face to New York City’s veterans and their families, especially those who had been 'captured' as former POWs." Ulrich wrote a letter July 20, 2015, to Jamaica Hospital, urging the Board of Directors to remove Trump's name from the nursing home. The Trump Pavilion for Nursing and Rehabilitation was named after Mary Anne Trump, and was built in 1975 with donations from Donald Trump's parents. The Trump name remains on the Pavilion. Ulrich endorsed John Kasich over Trump during his presidential run in 2016. When Trump became the presumptive nominee, Ulrich said he disliked Trump's offensive comments and speeches, but said he might end up voting for him should he "come around by [Election Day]".

==== Coronavirus; Oxiris Barbot ====
In early April 2020, he and Democratic New York City Councilman Robert Holden wrote to Mayor de Blasio asking him to relieve Commissioner of Health of the City of New York Oxiris Barbot of her position "before it’s too late," saying her guidance on the coronavirus had been disastrous.

=== Other political campaigns ===
==== 2012 State Senate election ====
In 2012, Ulrich ran for New York State Senate against incumbent Democratic Senator Joseph Addabbo Jr. in Senate district 15. Although the Queens Republican Party endorsed Juan D. Reyes in the primary, Ulrich prevailed nonetheless. During the campaign, Ulrich criticized Senator Addabbo, who publicly said there was "an understanding" that Resorts World Casino in Queens would hire 70–80% locally from Queens. The Daily News found that 61% of the "top tier" positions were held by employees residing in Queens County. On Election Day, Ulrich was defeated by Addabbo.

==== Potential run for Mayor of New York City, 2017 ====
Media speculated that Ulrich was a potential challenger to Bill De Blasio in the 2017 mayoral race after his 2013 press conference on an unplowed street in Queens, criticizing the newly elected mayor for his handling of the heavy snowfall. Ulrich launched an exploratory committee on May 12, 2016, but ultimately chose not to run.

==== 2019 New York City Public Advocate special election ====
Ulrich ran in the 2019 New York City Public Advocate special election. As the election was nonpartisan, Ulrich ran on the line titled Common Sense. Some of his endorsements included the Bronx GOP, Brooklyn GOP, Manhattan GOP, Queens GOP, and Staten Island GOP, as well as the New York Daily News, which, on February 20, 2019, wrote "Ulrich stands apart on a key issue of the day: He welcomed Amazon coming to Long Island City as the rest of the field was tripping over itself to denounce the deal."

In February 2019, New York Post contributor John Podhoretz wrote a column entitled "A Republican with a real chance to win an NYC-wide office," which was featured in the New York Post. Podhoretz's column cited private polling that showed Ulrich leading the field with 22 percent of the vote, giving him “a real shot at winning” the special election. However, Ulrich finished second in the special election with 19% of the vote; Jumaane Williams won the race with 33%.

=== New York City Buildings Commissioner/senior advisor to Eric Adams ===
On January 5, 2022, Ulrich was named as Senior Advisor to the Mayor by New York City Mayor Eric Adams. On May 3, 2022, Ulrich was appointed as commissioner of the New York City Department of Buildings.

== Indictment and trial in New York County ==
On November 1, 2022, investigators working for the Manhattan district attorney seized Ulrich's phone pursuant to a search warrant. On November 3, 2022, Ulrich resigned from his position as commissioner of the Buildings Department.

On August 3, 2023, the New York Daily News reported that Ulrich had been charged, in a sealed indictment, on corruption charges. On September 13, 2023, Ulrich was arrested on 16 felony corruption charges; he pleaded not guilty. Also charged were the brothers Anthony and Joseph Livreri, owners of a pizzeria, as well as Michael Mazzio, a tow-truck business owner. The indictment accuses the business owners of buying favors from Ulrich both before and after his appointment to the Adams administration. Ulrich allegedly used bribe money to make wagers in legal and illegal gaming establishments.

Anthony and Joseph Liveri pled guilty to charges in 2026, admitting to handing Ulrich $4,000 in an envelope to get rid of a city Building Department vacate order on a Brooklyn bakery.

The trial of Eric Ulrich began October 19 in New York Supreme Court. Ulrich waived his right to a jury and his case proceeded as a bench trial. Prosecutors argued Ulrich monetized his office for the simple reason that “he needed the cash” stemming from gambling debts. Though arguing that he is not guilty of the crimes of the indictment and is "man of integrity", Ulrich's defense admitted that he was an "addicted gambler" who attended illegal poker games hosted by the Liveri brothers.

Entered into evidence were text message threads that detailed patronage and favors. They included Ulrich demanding a gift for his daughter from a New York City Department of Sanitation worker; Ulrich acceding to a request to get a promotion for Michael Mazzio's daughter at New York City Department of Correction; and his griping over Joseph Liveri's request for a no-show job followed by his attempt to get one at New York City Economic Development Corporation. Ulrich ultimately obtained a job for Joseph Liveri with New York City Council Member Joann Ariola.

Wiretapped phone calls entered into evidence included the voice of Ulrich calling Fred Kreizman (head of the Mayor's Community Affairs Unit) and Ingrid Lewis-Martin (an advisor to Mayor Eric Adams). Ulrich specifically requested intervention to stop the New York City Department of Health and Mental Hygiene from shutting down the Liveri brothers' restaurant for code violations. Ulrich was recorded complaining that "One of the mayor's favorite restaurants in Queens got shut down tonight by the Board of Health." On a call from Joseph Livreri thanking him, Ulrich requested $300. Records indicated he received the money, which he said would be forwarded to a woman named "Marietta".

== Personal life ==
Ulrich married Yadira Moran on November 20, 2009. Eric and Yadira Ulrich had a daughter in 2012.

As of September 2023, Ulrich was reportedly dating Rhonda Binda, another employee in Mayor Eric Adams's administration.

== Electoral history ==
Election history
Location	Year	Election	Results
NYC Council District 32	2009	Special	✓ Eric Ulrich (R) 44.72% Lew Simon (D) 32.20% Geraldine Chapey (D) 11.59% Mike Ricatto (R) 9.19%
NYC Council District 32	2009	General	✓ Eric Ulrich (R) 58.74% Frank Gulluscio (D) 41.26%
NY Senate District 15	2012	General	✓ Joseph Addabbo Jr. (D) 57.57% Eric Ulrich (R) 42.36%
NYC Council District 32	2013	General	✓ Eric Ulrich (R) 53.56% Lew Simon (D) 46.37%
NYC Council District 32	2017	General	✓ Eric Ulrich (R) 65.8% Mike Scala 34.2% (D)
NYC Public Advocate	2019	Special	✓ Jumaane Williams (D) 33.2% Eric Ulrich (R) 19.1% Melissa Mark-Viverito (D) 11.0%

Political offices
Preceded by Joseph Addabbo Jr.	Member of the New York City Council from the 32nd district 2009–2021	Succeeded by Joann Ariola
