= Pesach Osina =

American politician

Member-elect of the New York State Assembly from the 23rd district
- Assuming office January 2027
- Succeeding: Stacey Pheffer Amato

Personal details
- Party: Democratic
- Spouse: Fraidy
- Children: 6 Children
- Website: www.pesachosina.com

Pesach Osina is an American politician. He is the Democratic member-elect of the New York State Assembly from the 23rd district. He has served as the Queens Borough Director in the office of the New York City Comptroller and as the Senior Community Liaison to a Speaker of the New York City Council.

In 2026, Pesach Osina ran for the New York State Assembly in the 23rd District following the retirement of incumbent Assemblywoman Stacey Pheffer Amato. Facing attorney Mike Scala in the June 23 Democratic primary, Osina received significant support from Pheffer Amato, who endorsed him as her preferred successor, as well as Democratic District Leaders Jonathan Lazo, Jeanette Garramone, and Frank Gulluscio. Their endorsements provided Osina, who entered the race with a comparatively limited public profile across the district, with the backing of established local Democratic leaders. Osina went on to defeat Scala with approximately 60.6% of the primary vote, securing the Democratic nomination. In the November 3 general election, he faced Republican Thomas P. Sullivan in a competitive race for the open seat. Osina defeated Sullivan with approximately 52% of the vote, becoming the district's next assemblymember.
