= Serphin R. Maltese =

American politician

Member of the New York State Senate from the 15th district
- In office January 1, 1989 – December 31, 2008
- Preceded by: Martin J. Knorr
- Succeeded by: Joseph Addabbo Jr.

Chair of the New York Conservative Party
- In office 1986–1988
- Preceded by: J. Daniel Mahoney
- Succeeded by: Michael R. Long

Personal details
- Born: December 7, 1932 (age 93) Corona, New York, U.S.
- Party: Conservative Party; Republican Party
- Education: Manhattan College (BA); Fordham University (LLB, JD)

Military service
- Allegiance: United States
- Branch/service: United States Army
- Rank: Corporal
- Unit: 45th Infantry Division
- Battles/wars: Korean War

Serphin R. Maltese (born December 7, 1932) is an American attorney and retired politician from the state of New York. A onetime chairman of the Conservative Party of New York, Maltese served as a state senator from district 15 from 1989 through 2008.

== Early life ==
Maltese, an Italian-American, was born in the neighborhood of Corona in the borough of Queens. In 1951, he graduated from Stuyvesant High School. He received a Bachelor of Arts from Manhattan College in 1958 and an LL.B. and a J.D. from the Fordham University School of Law. He is a Korean War veteran.

== Career ==
Maltese has served as a Queens Assistant District Attorney and Deputy Chief of the Queens Homicide Bureau.

In 1984, Maltese ran for a seat in the United States House of Representatives from central Queens. The seat was being vacated by Geraldine Ferraro, who was chosen to run for Vice President on the Democratic ticket with Walter Mondale. Maltese was defeated by Democrat Thomas J. Manton.

Maltese served as chairman of the Conservative Party of New York from 1986 to 1988.

Maltese represented New York's 15th State Senate District, located in Queens, from 1989 to 2008. He was elected as a Conservative for his first two terms, at most times with endorsement by the Republican and Right to Life parties. He became a Republican in 1990, and continued to win re-election in a district that normally favored Democrats. In 2006, Maltese was nearly defeated, narrowly beating Democrat Albert Baldeo by 894 votes. In 2008, Maltese was soundly defeated by New York City Councilman Joseph Addabbo Jr. as the Democrats took control of the State Senate.

During his Senate career, Maltese sponsored 239 bills that became law.

== Community involvement ==
As of February 2019, Maltese served as Chairman of the Board of Trustees of Christ The King Regional High School, an independent Catholic high school in Middle Village, Queens.

== Personal life ==
Maltese is married to portrait painter Constance Del Vecchio; they have two children and several grandchildren.

Party political offices
Preceded by J. Daniel Mahoney	Chairman of the Conservative Party of New York; 1986–1988	Succeeded by Michael R. Long
New York State Senate
Preceded by Martin J. Knorr	Member of the New York State Senate from the 15th district 1988–2008	Succeeded by Joseph Addabbo Jr.
