= Phil Goldfeder =

American politician

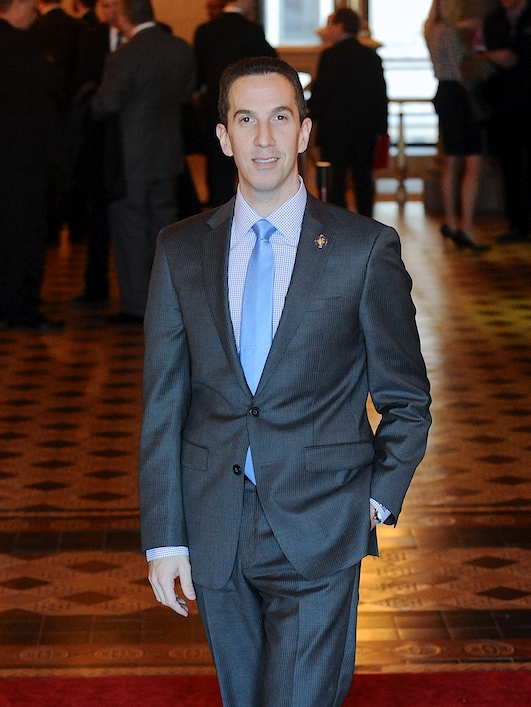

Member of the New York State Assembly from the 23rd district
- In office September 14, 2011 – November 8, 2016
- Preceded by: Audrey Pheffer
- Succeeded by: Stacey Pheffer Amato

Personal details
- Born: April 15, 1981 (age 45) Far Rockaway, New York
- Party: Democratic, Conservative
- Spouse: Esther Goldfeder
- Education: Brooklyn College
- Website: New York State Assembly 23rd District

Phil Goldfeder (born April 15, 1981) is an American politician and former Democratic New York State Assembly member from the 23rd district in Queens representing the communities of Ozone Park, Howard Beach, Lindenwood, Hamilton Beach, Broad Channel and Rockaway.

Prior to elected office, Goldfeder served as a senior advisor to Senate Majority Leader Chuck Schumer and New York City Mayor Michael Bloomberg. Goldfeder has most recently served as Senior Vice President of Global Public Affairs at the financial institution Cross River. In February 2023, it was announced that Goldfeder would leave Cross River to become C.E.O. of the American Fintech Council.

== Early life and career ==
Goldfeder was born and raised in the Far Rockaway neighborhood of Queens. His dedication to public service is often attributed to the influence of his father, a local volunteer EMT, as well as a visit by then-Assemblywoman Audrey Pheffer to Goldfeder's class when he was in middle school. In 2004, he received a Bachelor of Arts in political science from Brooklyn College. During his undergraduate studies, Goldfeder served as President of the college Law Society and was active in the political science club. In his senior year, he was awarded the CUNY Edward T. Rogowsky Internship in Government and Public Affairs.

After college, Goldfeder was hired as a constituent liaison in the New York City Council. In 2005, he worked on Mayor Michael Bloomberg's re-election campaign, later joining the Bloomberg administration as the Queens liaison for the Mayor's Community Affairs Unit. Following his time in City Hall, Goldfeder was hired by Senator Schumer in 2009 as his Director of Intergovernmental Affairs.

== New York State Assembly ==
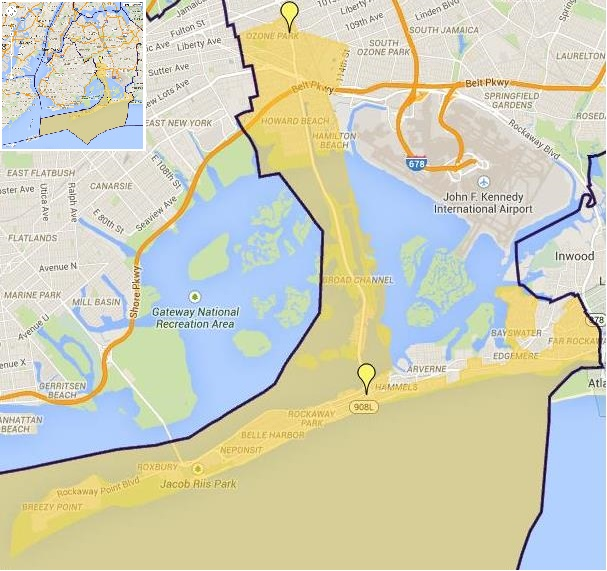
New York State Assembly District 23

=== Election ===
In May 2011, Audrey Pheffer announced that she would be stepping down after more than two decades as Assemblywoman to become Queens County Clerk. Goldfeder, a favorite to replace Pheffer, announced his candidacy, receiving the support of the Queens Democratic establishment to run in a special election against Republican candidate Jane Deacy, a former NYPD officer from Breezy Point. During the campaign, Goldfeder ran on a platform focusing on improving transportation in the district, ending the toll on the Cross Bay Bridge, and bringing full casino gaming to Aqueduct Racetrack. He also touted his years of public service working in city government and for Sen. Schumer. On September 13, 2011, Goldfeder was elected with 53% of the votes cast.

=== Superstorm Sandy ===
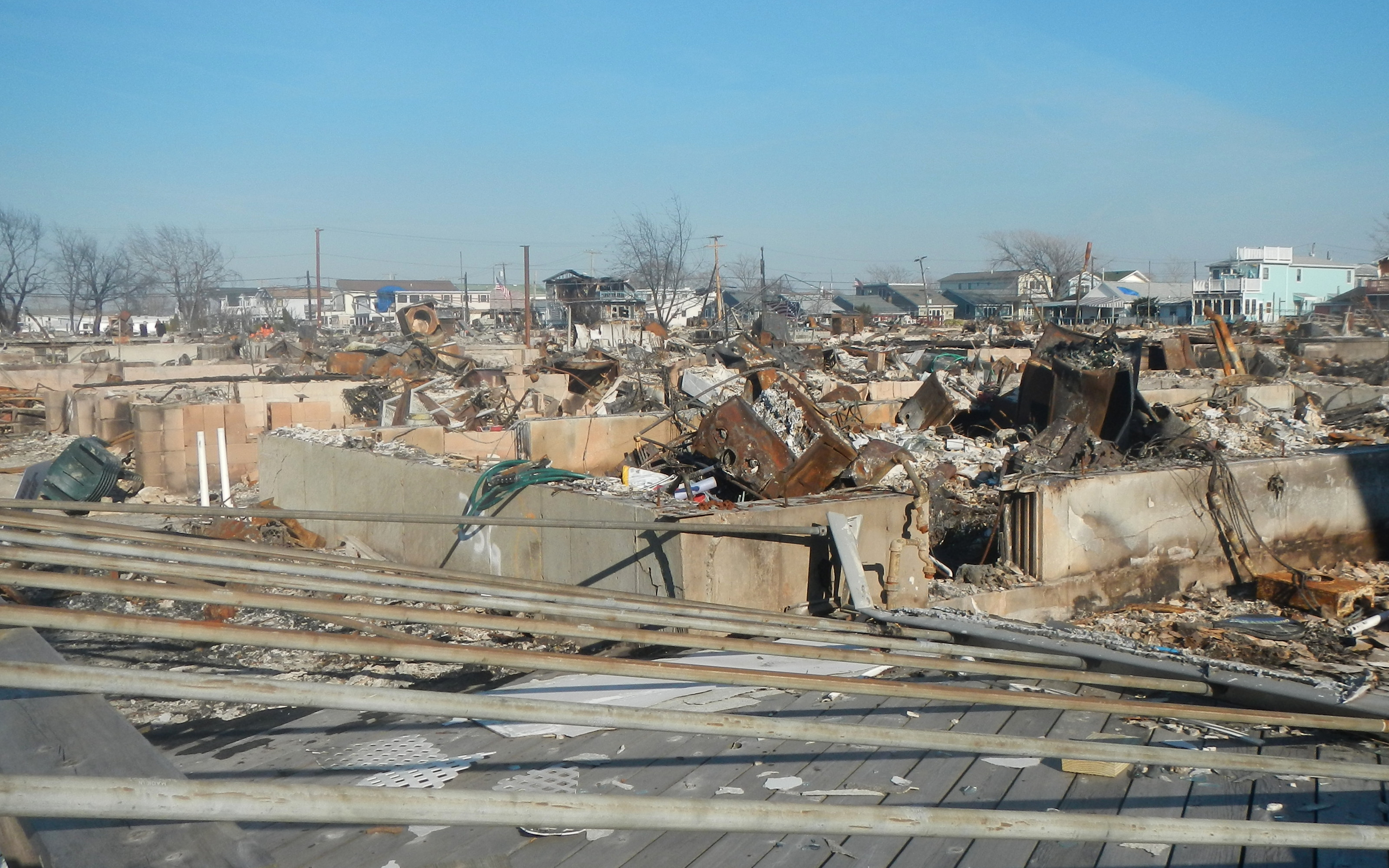
Superstorm Sandy aftermath in Breezy Point, Queens

On October 29, 2012, Superstorm Sandy struck New York City, causing damage to 85% of households in Goldfeder's district, including his own family home. In the days following the storm, Goldfeder lived out of the NYPD 101st Precinct in Far Rockaway while helping to coordinate recovery efforts and assist in delivering aid supplies to affected neighborhoods. As the initial emergency response transitioned into long-term recovery efforts, area residents began to express frustrations over the pace of rebuilding. In response, Goldfeder held multiple town hall meetings to provide residents and business owners with the opportunity to discuss their concerns with a broad range of agencies helping with relief efforts following Sandy.

=== Transportation ===
==== Cross Bay Bridge Toll ====
Goldfeder fulfilled one of his main campaign promises when, in 2012, he succeeded in having the Cross Bay Bridge rebate for Broad Channel and Rockaway re-inserted into Governor Andrew Cuomo's executive budget. The residency rebate, which was instituted in 1997 by then-Mayor Rudy Giuliani, credited residents' E-ZPass statements for round-trip tolls. However, the MTA partially rescinded the program in 2010 due to budget constraints. Under the plan secured by Goldfeder, residents of Rockaway and Broad Channel are reimbursed for all trips taken over the bridge from funds allocated in the state budget. Each year since assuming office, Goldfeder has reintroduced this legislation to maintain the residency rebate in the Executive Budget. Through 2014, he successfully kept the rebate in the state budget.

==== Rockaway Beach Rail Line ====
As a member of the Assembly Committee on Corporations, Authorities and Commissions, which oversees the MTA, transportation has been principle policy issue for Goldfeder. One of his major initiatives is the reactivation of the Rockaway Beach Rail Line. The Rockaway Beach Rail Line was operated by the Long Island Rail Road until a track fire, route truncation, and decreasing ridership lead to its shuttering in 1962. To show his support for this initiative, Goldfeder gathered more than 2,500 signatures in favor of reactivation and submitted them to the MTA, and Governor Andrew Cuomo. When the MTA convened a Transportation Reinvention Commission in 2014, Goldfeder testified before the MTA commission advocating for the reactivation of the Rockaway Beach Rail Line during a public hearing. When the commission's report was released, it highlighted the need to use existing rights of way, including the Rockaway Beach Rail Line, to expand subway and light rail service across the New York City metropolitan area. Most recently, at Goldfeder's request, Queens College's Department of Urban Studies initiated a study in November 2013 to poll the opinions of local residents on the best use of the abandoned rail line. When the survey was completed, it showed residents' preference for expanded transportation over a proposed plan to convert the elevated train trestle into a park similar to the High Line. It also showed that the proposed transportation link would serve up to 500,000 trips per day.

One of Goldfeder's principal reasons for supporting the project is its economic impact. According to Goldfeder, reactivation of the Rockaway Beach Rail Line would create jobs, decrease commute times to typically higher paying jobs in Manhattan, and bring new discretionary spending from other boroughs into Queens' businesses. The route would also fill a gap in the city's transportation system, providing the only direct rail link between northern and southern Queens. Goldfeder has frequently referenced a NYU Wagner Rudin Center study on the relationship between mass transit and economic opportunity which revealed that neighborhoods with limited public transit options such as Belle Harbor, Howard Beach, and South Ozone Park, also limit their residents' access to jobs with social mobility. The proposal garnered strong union support; Transport Workers Union of America 100 Local President John Samuelson said, "Reactivating the Rockaway Beach Line is the ideal place to start. It is the most sensible and practical solution to transportation inequality in southern Queens. It will not only improve inter-modal connectivity throughout the borough, but it will also multiply benefits for the city in quality union jobs, regional economic development, and fare revenues."

==== Rockaway Ferry ====
The extensive damage to A train tracks during Superstorm Sandy left residents of Broad Channel and Rockaway without subway service to Manhattan. As a temporary substitute, Mayor Michael Bloomberg put in place a ferry service from Rockaway to Manhattan. In July 2013, Bloomberg extended service of the Rockaway ferry through Labor Day. While Goldfeder commended the extension, he maintained the position that his work is not done until the ferry service is made permanent. As A train service resumed and city officials prepared to end the Rockaway ferry, the Assemblyman started a petition to make ferry service to Manhattan a permanent fixture within the Rockaway community. The petition gained support from thousands who signed online and was delivered to City Hall by Goldfeder himself. As a result, ferry service was extended to January 2014. In 2014, Mayor Bill de Blasio granted two extensions in January and June, with service slated to end by October. On August 21, 2014, Assemblyman Goldfeder, Queens Borough President Melinda Katz, community leaders, and dozens of Rockaway residents gathered outside city hall to call for another extension to the ferry line. Goldfeder said, "removing the ferry would be just another blow to so many people who are still struggling to recover; it would be detrimental not just to one community, but to every Queens neighborhood who relies on the ferry for transportation." Despite 11th hour appeals made by Assemblyman Goldfeder and other elected Rockaway officials during an emergency meeting with Mayor de Blasio, ferry service ended on October 31, 2014. Goldfeder said, "We will continue to do everything we can with City Hall to get the ferry back." In his 2015 State of the City address, Mayor de Blasio announced a plan for a 5 borough ferry service in 2017, that would include a Rockaway ferry, priced the same as the normal metro fare. While he was pleased with the announcement of impending ferry service, Goldfeder said, "It should not take two years to bring it back. Our struggling families deserve equal access to transit just like every other resident in this city and I will not stop fighting until this is a reality."

=== Flood insurance ===
In the wake of Superstorm Sandy, many of Goldfeder's constituents experienced issues in dealing with their flood insurance providers. In an effort to assist families, Goldfeder sponsored Sandy insurance legislation in the Assembly to reform the process of providing insurance coverage, strengthen homeowners' rights and hold insurance companies to a higher standard of accountability. In response to concerns from families still waiting on their Sandy Insurance payments, Goldfeder called on the five major banks handling insurance payouts to speed up the disbursement of insurance checks to residents in areas afflicted by Sandy. During this time, Goldfeder worked with colleagues in Washington to secure passage of a bill in Congress to delay dramatic increases in flood insurance planned under the 2012 Biggert-Waters Act.

==== Assembly Insurance Committee ====
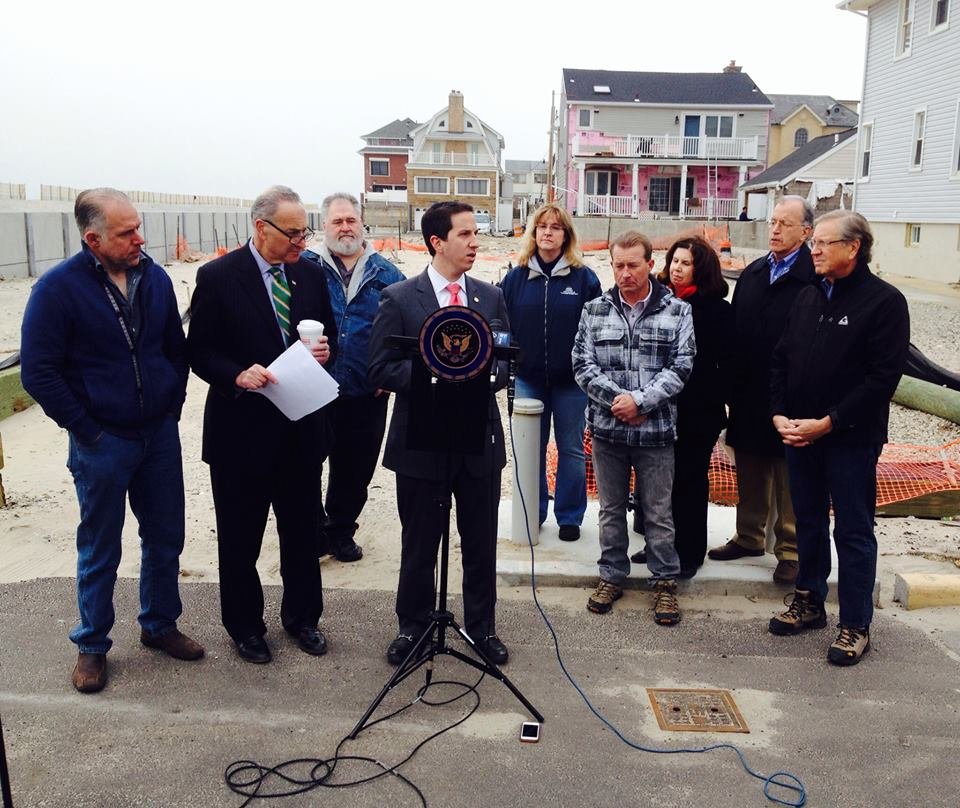
Goldfeder with Sen. Schumer at a March 2014 Press Conference to urge passage of the Homeowner Flood Insurance Affordability Act

In 2015, Goldfeder was appointed to the New York State Assembly's Insurance Committee where he promised to use his new role, "to hold insurance companies accountable and make sure our families are treated fairly and with compassion in their time of greatest need." Following his appointment, Goldfeder introduced a bill to establish the New York Flood Insurance Association (NYFIA). The association would be composed of state-approved insurers required to share in premium profits and losses, and operating costs. It would be overseen by the Superintendent of the state Department of Financial Services and a board of thirteen directors. In a 2014 op-ed, Goldfeder explained that his plan was inspired by the New York Property Insurance Underwriting Association, which was created in the late 1960s as a way to provide fire insurance to inner-city property owners unable to purchase coverage because of risks stemming from civil unrest and urban decay. The Assemblyman's legislation was motivated by issues homeowners in his district faced after Sandy, which included protracted fights with policy providers over coverage and recent reports of alleged fraudulent practices by flood insurance companies and the National Flood Insurance Program administered by FEMA According to Goldfeder, the proposal would help protect homeowners from being overcharged for premiums or dropped from their policies after major storms like Sandy.

== Post-public office ==
On June 2, 2016, Goldfeder announced that he would not be seeking a fourth term in the November 2016 elections. Goldfeder subsequently announced his resignation effective Election Day 2016 to take a position at Yeshiva University. In 2017, Goldfeder joined New Jersey–based Cross River Bank, where he served as SVP for Global Public Affairs until 2023.

== Personal life ==
Goldfeder lives in Far Rockaway with his wife, Esther, and their three children.

Goldfeder is an avid runner. He regularly competes in local charity races in his district and in 2014 ran the 15K Utica Boilermaker.

Political offices
| Preceded by Audrey Pheffer | New York State Assembly; 23rd District; 2011–2016 | Succeeded by Stacey Pheffer Amato |
