= Alfonso C. Stabile =

American politician (1947–2015)

Member of the New York City Council from the 32nd district
- In office January 1, 1994 – December 31, 2001
- Preceded by: Walter Ward
- Succeeded by: Joseph Addabbo Jr.

Personal details
- Born: June 11, 1947 East New York, Brooklyn, U.S.
- Died: August 29, 2015 (aged 68) Howard Beach, New York, U.S.
- Party: Republican
- Spouse: Sara Jane Friia (m. 1969)
- Children: 2

Alfonso C. "Al" Stabile (June 11, 1947 – August 29, 2015) is an American politician who was a New York City Council member from 1994 to 2001, representing the 32nd district of Woodhaven, Richmond Hill, Ozone Park, South Ozone Park, Howard Beach, Hamilton Beach, Lindenwood, Broad Channel and the Rockaways. He was also the Republican and Conservative candidate for Queens Borough President in 2001.

== Early life and education ==
Stabile was born in the East New York section of Brooklyn, one of two boys born to Carmine and Concetta Stabile. He began his education at P.S. 64 and soon after his family moved to Ozone Park, Queens. He graduated John Adams High School in Ozone Park and completed his education at York College in Jamaica, Queens and the University of Maryland, College Park.

== Career ==
In 1967, Stabile enlisted in the United States Army and served in the 6th Infantry Division. He attained the rank of Sergeant and served in the Vietnam War. After leaving the military, Stabile began working for the New York City Department of Sanitation as a driver. He married the former Sara Jane Friia in 1969 and had two children, Frank and Connie. Around this time he bought his first piece of real estate, which led to a career as a realtor. In November 1993, Stabile entered the political arena for the first time and defeated 24-year incumbent City Councilman Walter Ward. He was known affectionately to his constituents as "Big Al".

Political offices
Preceded by Walter Ward	New York City Council, 32nd district 1994–2001	Succeeded by Joseph Addabbo Jr.
Party political offices
Preceded by No candidate¹	Republican Party borough presidential candidate 2001	Succeeded by Philip T. Sica
Preceded by No candidate¹	Conservative Party borough presidential candidate 2001	Succeeded by Philip T. Sica
Notes and references
1. Lombardi, Frank (1997-09-08). "Races Go Down To The Wire Heated Primary-Election Fights". New York Daily News.
