= Stacey Pheffer Amato =

American politician

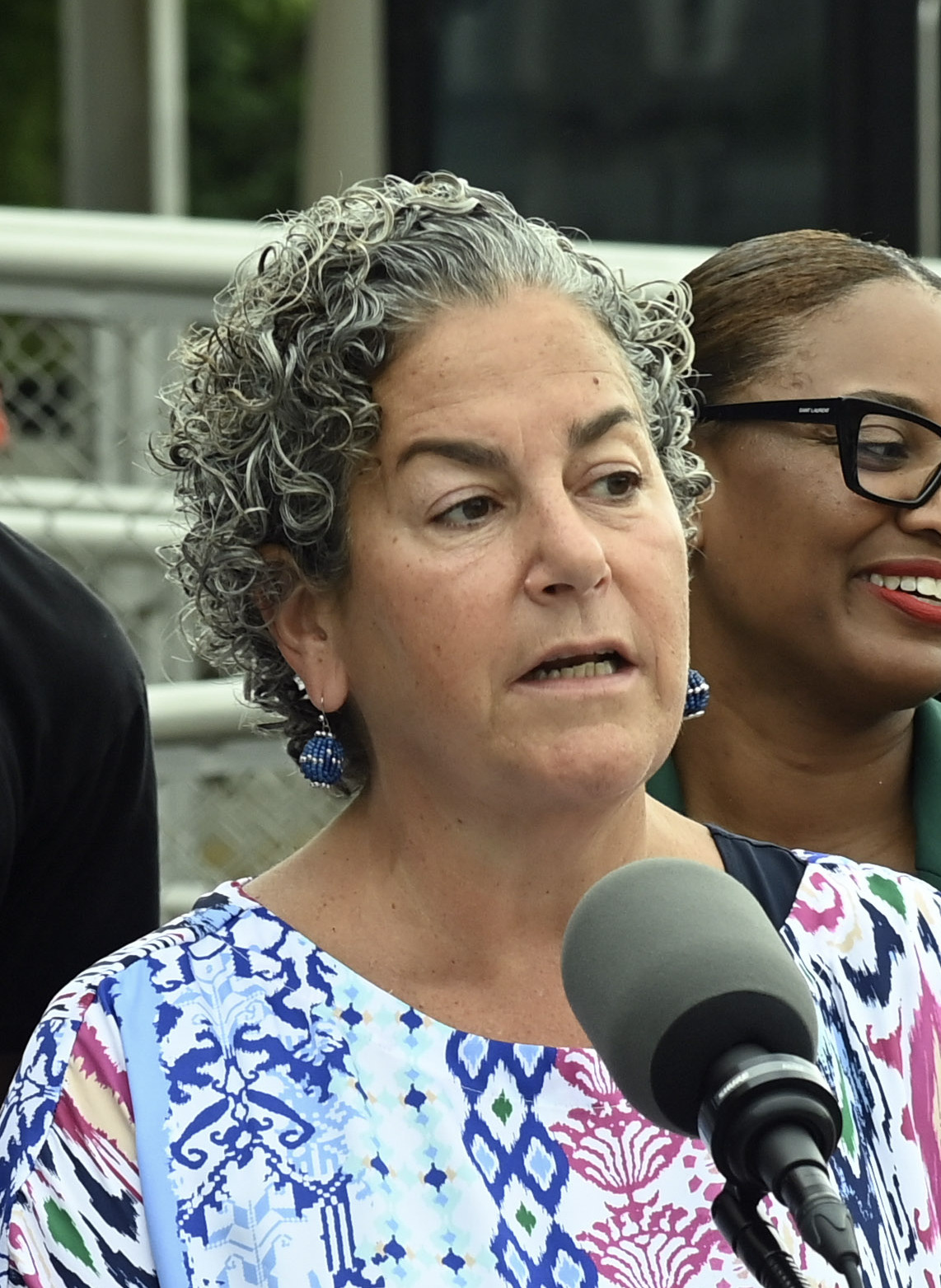
- Pheffer Amato in 2023

Member of the New York State Assembly from the 23rd district
- Incumbent
- Assumed office January 1, 2017
- Preceded by: Phillip Goldfeder
- Succeeded by: Pesach Osina (elect)

Personal details
- Born: March 19, 1966 (age 60) Queens, New York, U.S.
- Party: Democratic
- Relatives: Audrey Pheffer (mother)
- Education: State University of New York, Oneonta (BS)
- Website: State Assembly website

Stacey Pheffer Amato (born March 19, 1966) is a member of the New York State Assembly, representing the 23rd district, which includes portions of Queens. A member of the Democratic Party, Pheffer Amato was first elected in 2016.

== Early life and career ==
Pheffer Amato was born in Rockaway, Queens. Prior to holding office, she worked as an education paraprofessional for the New York City Department of Education and as a procurement analyst for the FDNY and the New York City Department of Sanitation. She holds a bachelor's degree in business economics from the State University of New York at Oneonta. She has been an active member of the Rockaway Beach Civic Association for years and is a committee member of the NY Rising Community Reconstruction Program, which is tasked with overseeing the state's recovery efforts from Hurricane Sandy.

== Elections ==
In 2016, Assemblymember Phillip Goldfeder announced abruptly that he would retire. Pheffer Amato soon after announced that she would seek the Democratic nomination. With support from the Queens County Democratic Party, she was unopposed in the primary. She defeated Republican Alan N. Zwirn in the 2016 general election, 68% to 32%, to take the seat. She was easily re-elected in 2018.

In 2022, Pheffer Amato defeated her Republican opponents by just 15 votes. She was not declared the winner until January 2023, two months after the election.

In 2024, Pheffer Amato defeated her Republican opponent, Tom Sullivan, by 1,568 votes. During her campaign she was endorsed by every New York City police union.

== State Assembly ==
In the Assembly, she is the Chair on the Subcommittee on Child Product Safety. Her mother, Queens County Clerk Audrey Pheffer, previously held this Assembly seat. Upon Pheffer Amato's election, they became the first mother-daughter team to hold the same seat in the New York State Legislature.

In 2023, Pheffer Amato was appointed the chair of the New York State Assembly Governmental Employees Committee. During her tenure in the Assembly she has the most pieces of legislation among the New York City delegation with 69 bills signed into law.

== Personal life ==
Pheffer Amato and her husband, Frank, live in Rockaway Beach with their two children. She is Jewish.
