= Noach Dear =

American politician and judge (1953–2020)

Justice of New York Supreme Court
- In office November 5, 2015 – April 19, 2020
- Preceded by: David Schmidt
- Succeeded by: Vacant

Member of the New York City Council
- In office January 1, 1983 – December 31, 2001
- Preceded by: Susan Alter
- Succeeded by: Simcha Felder
- Constituency: 32nd district (1983–1991); 44th district (1991–2001)

Personal details
- Born: November 20, 1953 Brooklyn, New York, U.S.
- Died: April 19, 2020 (aged 66) Brooklyn, New York, U.S.
- Party: Democratic
- Children: 4
- Education: Brooklyn College (BS); Yeshiva University (MSW); Brooklyn Law School (JD)

Noach Dear (November 20, 1953 – April 19, 2020) was an American attorney, politician, and jurist who served as a New York Supreme Court judge. Dear was elected in 2008 as a civil court judge, in 2010 as an Acting Supreme Court Justice, and in 2015 for a 15-year term as a Permanent Justice on the New York Supreme Court. Prior to his appointment, he served as a member of the New York City Council from 1983 to 2001. He died during the COVID-19 pandemic due to complications of COVID-19.

== Early life and education ==
Dear was born in Brooklyn, New York, the son of Joan (Lipins) and Sidney Dear. As a child, Dear was in Eli Lipsker's Pirchei Agudath Israel Choir, and sang on the second New York Pirchei album, Pirchei Sings אליך ה' אקרא. He attended Yeshiva Torah Vodaas. He maintained a connection to the Jewish music business into his early adulthood, being a founding member of the Clei Zemer Orchestra.

Dear received a B.S. from Brooklyn College (1975), a master's degree in social work from Wurzweiler School of Social Work at Yeshiva University (1975), and a JD from Brooklyn Law School (1991).

== Career ==
His public service career began as a district leader and as district manager of Brooklyn's Community Board 12.

Dear served as a member of the New York City Council from 1983 to 2001. He headed the Transportation Committee and opposed commuter vans, otherwise known as "dollar vans," as a transportation alternative while in office. Council member Dear also served on "the Finance and Land Use Committees as well."

He advocated support for the State of Israel and concern for the issues impacting the primarily Jewish-and heavily Orthodox Jewish-residents in his community, which included Midwood, as well as large swaths of Borough Park and Bensonhurst, all in Brooklyn. In 1986, Dear voted against a civil rights bill prohibiting discrimination on the basis of sexual orientation in employment, housing, and public accommodation. In 1987 he introduced a bill, supported by "about 30 members of the City Council," to push permission for "more Jews .. to leave the Soviet Union."

Dear was appointed Commissioner of the New York City Taxi and Limousine Commission in 2002 for a seven-year term.

Dear was widely seen as a political rival of Assemblyman Dov Hikind, who represented many of the same constituents that Dear once represented while in office, and comes from an Orthodox Jewish background.

Term-limited out of office, Dear launched an uphill campaign for the New York State Senate seat now held by Kevin Parker in 2002. In a five-candidate field, Dear narrowly lost to Parker by a margin of 909 votes. Dear also ran in a Democratic congressional primary that chose the successor to Charles Schumer in 1998, which saw him face three other candidates, including the eventual winner, Anthony Weiner.

Dear was a New York Supreme Court judge, elected in 2008 as a civil court judge, in 2010 as an Acting Supreme Court Justice, and in 2015 for a 15-year term as a Permanent Justice on the Supreme Court.

== Death ==
Dear contracted COVID-19 during the COVID-19 pandemic in New York, was sick for weeks, and was placed on a ventilator. He died on April 19, 2020, aged 66. Dear was the second Brooklyn judge to die as a result of COVID-19.

Political offices
Preceded by Susan Alter	New York City Council, 32nd district 1983–1991	Succeeded by Walter Ward
Preceded by New district	New York City Council, 44th district 1992–2001	Succeeded by Simcha Felder
