= Audrey Pheffer =

American politician

Audrey I. Pheffer

Member of the New York State Assembly from the 23rd district
- In office April 28, 1987 – March 23, 2011
- Preceded by: Gerdi E. Lipschutz
- Succeeded by: Phillip Goldfeder

Personal details
- Born: August 13, 1941 (age 85) Brooklyn, New York
- Party: Democratic
- Domestic partner: Glenn Riddell
- Children: Two including Stacey
- Education: Queens College CUNY
- Profession: Politician
- Website: Official website

Audrey I. Pheffer (born August 13, 1941) is an American Democratic Party politician from New York. She is currently serving as Queens County Clerk. Previously, she represented District 23 in the New York State Assembly from 1987 to 2011, which comprised Rockaway Beach, Howard Beach and Ozone Park, among other neighborhoods found within the New York City borough of Queens.

== Early life ==
Pheffer worked from 1973 to 1977 at the Rockaway Occupational Training Center and agency of the Queens Association of ARC, where she worked with the developmentally disabled. In 1977, she was a member of the New York City Commission of Human Rights.

Despite her long separation from education and having only a high school diploma, she successfully combined being a working mom and a full-time student at Queens College, City University of New York, where she received a B.A. degree, cum laude, in 1982.

She was a Special Assistant to former New York City Council President Andrew Stein and Executive Assistant to State Senator Jeremy S. Weinstein.

Pheffer resides in Far Rockaway and has two children, Mitchell and Stacey. She and her partner Glenn Riddell have six grandchildren.

== Political career ==
On April 28, 1987, she elected to the New York State Assembly, to fill the vacancy caused by the resignation of Gerdi E. Lipschutz. Pheffer was re-elected many times, and remained in the Assembly until 2011, sitting in the 187th, 188th, 189th, 190th, 191st, 192nd, 193rd, 194th, 195th, 196th, 197th, 198th and 199th New York State Legislatures. She was Chairwoman of the Committee on Consumer Affairs and Protection from 1995 to 2011. In the past she has chaired the Assembly's Election Law Committee and the Subcommittee on Outreach and Oversight of Senior Citizen Programs, and served as President of the National Order of Women Legislators from 1995 to 1996.

In 2001 Pheffer launched a run for Queens Borough President before ultimately withdrawing from the race.

In 2011, she resigned from the State Assembly after being appointed to the position of County Clerk of Queens County. She is ex officio a clerk of the New York Supreme Court and Commissioner of Jurors of Queens. In 2016, her daughter Stacey Pheffer Amato was elected to her mother's old Assembly seat, becoming the first such same-seat mother-daughter combination in the Assembly's history.

New York State Assembly
| Preceded by Gerdi E. Lipschutz | New York State Assembly; 23rd District; 1987–2011 | Succeeded by Phillip Goldfeder |
