= Cross River Bank =

American financial services corporation

- Type: Private
- Industry: Banking; Financial services Financial technology
- Founded: 2008
- Headquarters: Fort Lee, New Jersey, U.S.
- Key people: Gilles Gade: CEO; Hillel Olivestone: EVP, Chief Strategy Officer; Karan Mehta: EVP, CFO; Arlen Gelbard: EVP, General Counsel; Phillip Riese: Board Director; Scott Tobin: Board Director
- Products: Consumer banking Commercial banking Community banking Digital banking BaaS; Peer-to-peer lending
- Total assets: ▲$8.53 billion (June 30, 2026)
- Number of employees: 500 (2021)
- Website: www.crossriver.com

Cross River is an American financial services organization that provides technology infrastructure to fintech and technology companies. Based in Fort Lee, New Jersey, Cross River services its clients with embedded payments, cards, lending, and cryptocurrency, and is an FDIC member. Cross River is noted for its embrace of the trend in the financial services sector towards API-based payment platform services.

== History ==
Cross River Bank was founded in 2008 by French-born entrepreneur Gilles Gade as a community bank. In 2010, Cross River entered into its first tech partnership. In October 2015, Cross River Bank announced a $100 million securitization with Marlette funding. As of 2020, Cross River counts more than a dozen lending partners including Affirm, Rocketloans and Upstart.

In 2019, Cross River received a Grow NJ grant from the New Jersey Economic Development Authority (NJEDA) to expand its operations, leading to the purchase of new office space in Fort Lee and a commitment to hire 250 new employees.

The same year, Cross River announced the acquisition of Seed, a Portland, Oregon-based firm specializing in small business banking.

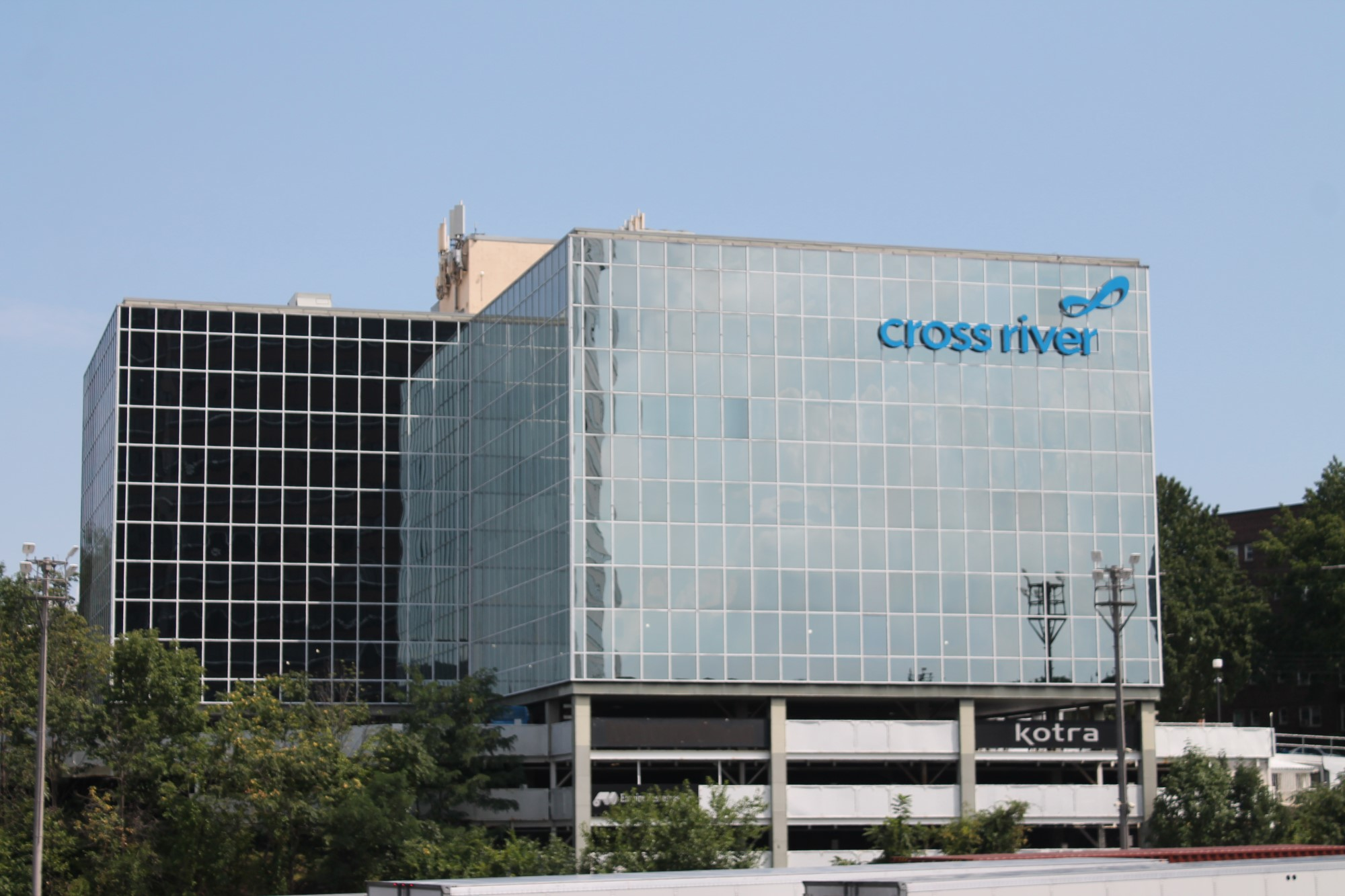
Cross River headquarters

The deal included the retention of Seed employees and senior leadership and a plan for Cross River to maintain office space in Portland and San Francisco, expanding the firm's small business banking and technology services and providing its first presence on the West Coast.

Cross River officially opened its new corporate headquarters in April 2021. The 70,000 square-foot building in Fort Lee, acquired with the assistance of the 2019 Grow NJ grant, was anticipated to accommodate the firm’s expanding workforce, which by this point had increased to some 500 employees. At the grand opening ceremony, New Jersey Governor Phil Murphy credited Cross River’s continued presence in the state with helping “bring [New Jersey] once again to the forefront of the innovation economy.”

In April 2023, the Wall Street Journal and Bloomberg reported that the FDIC sent the bank a cease-and-desist order due to what the regulator characterized as "unsafe or unsound banking practices".

== Operations ==
The bank focuses on traditional community banking activities, including taking deposits and making loans, and technology services. The bank originates loans for marketplace lenders and processes payments, and is known for its roster of clients in emerging fintech sectors. As of 2020, the bank has assets of approximately $9.9 billion and maintains 300 employees at its branch office and corporate headquarters in New Jersey. During the COVID-19 pandemic, the bank was one of the nation's top lenders under the CARES Act's Paycheck Protection Program, originating $6.5 billion in loans to more than 198,000 American small businesses, the third largest number of total loans by a financial institution.

Cross River has received investments from a number of notable private equity and venture capital firms. On November 1, 2016 Cross River Bank announced it had completed a $28 million growth-equity investment led by investment firm Battery Ventures, with participation from Andreessen Horowitz and Ribbit Capital. Private equity firm KKR & Co. Inc. led a $100 million investment in the bank, including $75 million of its own capital, in 2018. In 2020, the bank, through its parent company, issued $106 million in private placement subordinated bonds.

In 2021, Cross River established a venture capital arm, Cross River Digital Ventures, to invest in start-ups operating in sectors including lending, payments, investing and fintech, and has also partnered with companies such as Ibanera.

== Services ==
Cross River offers a number of banking-as-a-service products. In 2019, the bank announced that it was joining The Clearing House's real-time payments system, as well as partnering with Stripe. Cross River also offers marketplace lending services such as compliance, payments, credit and underwriting, and balance sheet capacity. Cross River partners with Coinbase to provide cryptocurrency, and has developed APIs to facilitate cryptocurrency transactions.

In addition to its headquarters, Cross River has a branch in Teaneck, New Jersey.

== Public relations ==
Cross River maintains partnerships with local elected officials and community-based organizations to provide charity and financial literacy services. In 2019, the bank started its Cross River Financial Literacy Initiative, working in collaboration with New Jersey-area public schools and members of the New Jersey Legislature. In March 2020, the bank announced that this initiative would partner with Operation HOPE, Inc. to provide virtual financial literacy programming in response to the COVID-19 pandemic.
