= Juan D. Reyes =

American lawyer (born 1968)

Juan de Dios Reyes, III (born March 12, 1968, in Bronx, New York) is an American politician for the Republican party and attorney in New York City.

== Early life ==
Reyes was born to Dr. Juan de Dios Reyes Alvarado, II, and Catherine Reyes (née Darmanin) on March 12, 1968, at Bronx Lebanon Hospital. He grew up in the family home in Forest Hills Gardens with his parents, his brother Alexander, and his sister Katherine.

== Education ==
Reyes attended Our Lady Queen of Martyrs elementary school in Forest Hills. He transferred to the St. David's School in Manhattan for middle school and attended The Browning School for high school. He graduated from Emory University with a bachelor's degree in political science. He later attended Quinnipiac University Law School in Connecticut, where he earned his JD.

== Career ==
After law school Reyes joined the Giuliani Administration in New York City. He worked at the Department of Youth Services as deputy general counsel. Later, he served as a counsel in the Office of the Mayor and then as general counsel at the Board of Standards and Appeals (BSA).

He is currently a partner at the international law firm Reed Smith in the New York office.

== Political career ==
Reyes was a candidate for the Republican nomination for the 15th New York State Senate District in 2012. He was endorsed by the Queens Republican Party.

== Family ==
Reyes married Meaghan O'Brien in 2002. The couple has three daughters.
