= Joseph Addabbo Jr. =

American politician (born 1964)

Joseph Addabbo
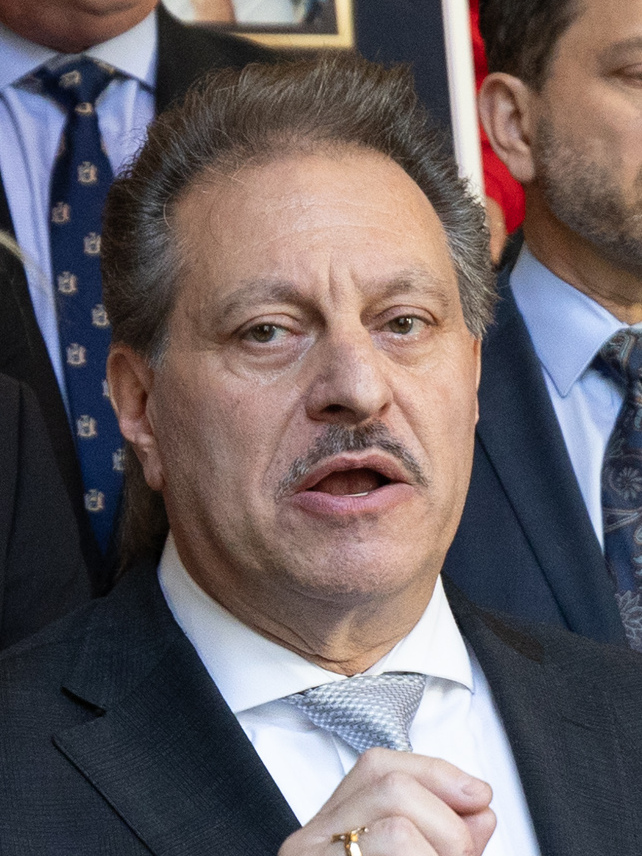
- Addabbo Jr. in 2025

Member of the New York State Senate from the 15th district
- Incumbent
- Assumed office January 1, 2009
- Preceded by: Serphin R. Maltese

Member of the New York City Council from the 32nd district
- In office January 1, 2002 – December 31, 2008
- Preceded by: Alfonso C. Stabile
- Succeeded by: Eric Ulrich

Personal details
- Born: Joseph Patrick Addabbo Jr. May 13, 1964 (age 62)
- Party: Democratic
- Education: St. John's University (BA); Touro University (JD)
- Website: State Senate website

Joseph Patrick Addabbo Jr. (born May 13, 1964) is an American politician from the state of New York. A Democrat, Addabbo represents New York's 15th State Senate district in Queens. The district includes all or portions of the following neighborhoods: Forest Hills, Glendale, Kew Gardens, Lindenwood, Ozone Park, Maspeth, Middle Village, Rego Park, Richmond Hill, South Richmond Hill, South Ozone Park, and Woodhaven. Addabbo was first elected to the State Senate in 2008.

== Early life, family, and education ==
Addabbo was born in 1964, the youngest child of Congressman Joseph Patrick Addabbo, Sr., and Grace Addabbo. He attended Nativity BVM School in Ozone Park and Archbishop Molloy High School, graduating in 1982. He later received degrees from St. John's University (1986) and Touro Law School (1992). His father served 13 terms in the United States House of Representatives. Addabbo practiced law for 10 years before being elected to the New York City Council.

== New York City Council ==
Addabbo was elected to the New York City Council in 2001. He was re-elected three times and served as a councilmember for eight years.

== New York State Senate ==
By 2008, Republican state Senator Serphin R. Maltese had served the southern Queens district for ten terms, despite the district leaning Democratic. Facing term limits in the Council in 2009, Addabbo decided to challenge Maltese. In a good year for Democrats, Addabbo defeated Maltese 57% to 43%. In 2010, Addabbo was re-elected, defeating Republican New York City Councilmember Anthony Como in 2010.

In 2011, Addabbo voted for same-sex marriage legislation that passed the Senate and became law. This vote was a change in position, as Addabbo had been one of a handful of Democratic votes against the bill when it was defeated in the Senate in 2009.

In the Senate, Addabbo serves as the Chair of the Senate Racing, Gaming and Wagering Committee.

In 2024, Governor Kathy Hochul vetoed Addabbo's bill that would have expedited the licensing of new casinos in the New York City metropolitan area.

In 2025, he authored legislation mandating that MTA subway trains have a two-person crew. Critics described two-person crews as costly and unnecessary, as most of the world’s major train lines have either one-person crews or have moved to full automation.

Addabbo has been a perennial sponsor of iGaming or online gambling legislation that would allow existing sportsbooks operators to offer casino games like slot machines, Texas Hold'em poker or live dealer table games. Additionally, the seven state licensed casinos would have the opportunity to apply for licenses as well. As of June 2026, the bill has yet reach the Senate floor for a vote.

== Personal life ==
Addabbo and his wife, Dawn, have two daughters.

== See also ==
- 2009 New York State Senate leadership crisis
