= Ozone Park =

Neighborhood in New York City

Coordinates: 40.68°N 73.85°W

- Neighborhood of Queens
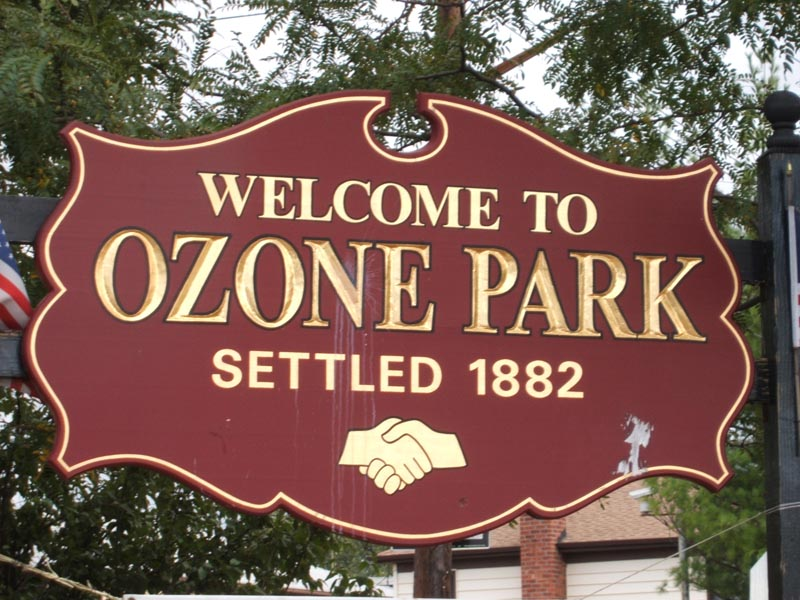
- Welcome sign
- Location within New York City
- Country: United States
- State: New York
- City: New York City
- County/Borough: Queens
- Community District: Queens 9, Queens 10

Population (2010 United States census)
  - Total: 21,376 (main section only)

Ethnicity (Census 2010)
  - Hispanic: 37.9%
  - White: 30.5%
  - Asian: 19.4%
  - Black: 5.6%
  - Other: 6.6%

Economics
  - Median income: $41,291
- Time zone: UTC−05:00 (EST)
  - Summer (DST): UTC−04:00 (EDT)
- ZIP Codes: 11416, 11417
- Area codes: 718, 347, 929, and 917

Ozone Park is a neighborhood in the southwestern section of the New York City borough of Queens, New York, United States. It is next to the Aqueduct Racetrack in South Ozone Park, a popular spot for Thoroughbred racing and home to the Resorts World Casino & Hotel. Home to a large Italian-American population, Ozone Park has also grown in recent decades to have many residents of Caribbean, Hispanic, and Asian backgrounds.

While New York City neighborhoods do not have formal boundaries, Ozone Park is considered to have a northern border at Atlantic Avenue; the southern border is North Conduit Avenue, the western border is the Brooklyn/Queens border line; (Note: The border with Brooklyn runs on a zigzag. Going south from Atlantic Avenue, it travels south on Eldert Lane, east on 95th Avenue, south on Drew Street, east on Liberty Avenue, south om 75th Street, and east on North Conduit Avenue.) and the eastern border is up to 108th Street and Aqueduct Racetrack.

Ozone Park is in two community districts, divided by Liberty and 103rd Avenues. (Note: The border of Community Districts 9 and 10 is Liberty Avenue west of 84th Street and 103rd Avenue east of 84th Street) The southern half of the neighborhood is in Queens Community District 10, which is covered by New York City Police Department's 106th Precinct, while the northern half is in Queens Community District 9 and covered by the NYPD's 102nd Precinct. Its ZIP Codes are 11416 and 11417.

== Etymology ==
The name "Ozone Park" was chosen for the development to "lure buyers with the idea of refreshing breezes blowing in from the Atlantic Ocean to a park-like community". At the time, ozone, now known to be a harmful pollutant at ground level, was popularly thought to be a healthful component of fresh air such as mountain or sea breezes.

== History ==
=== Early history ===
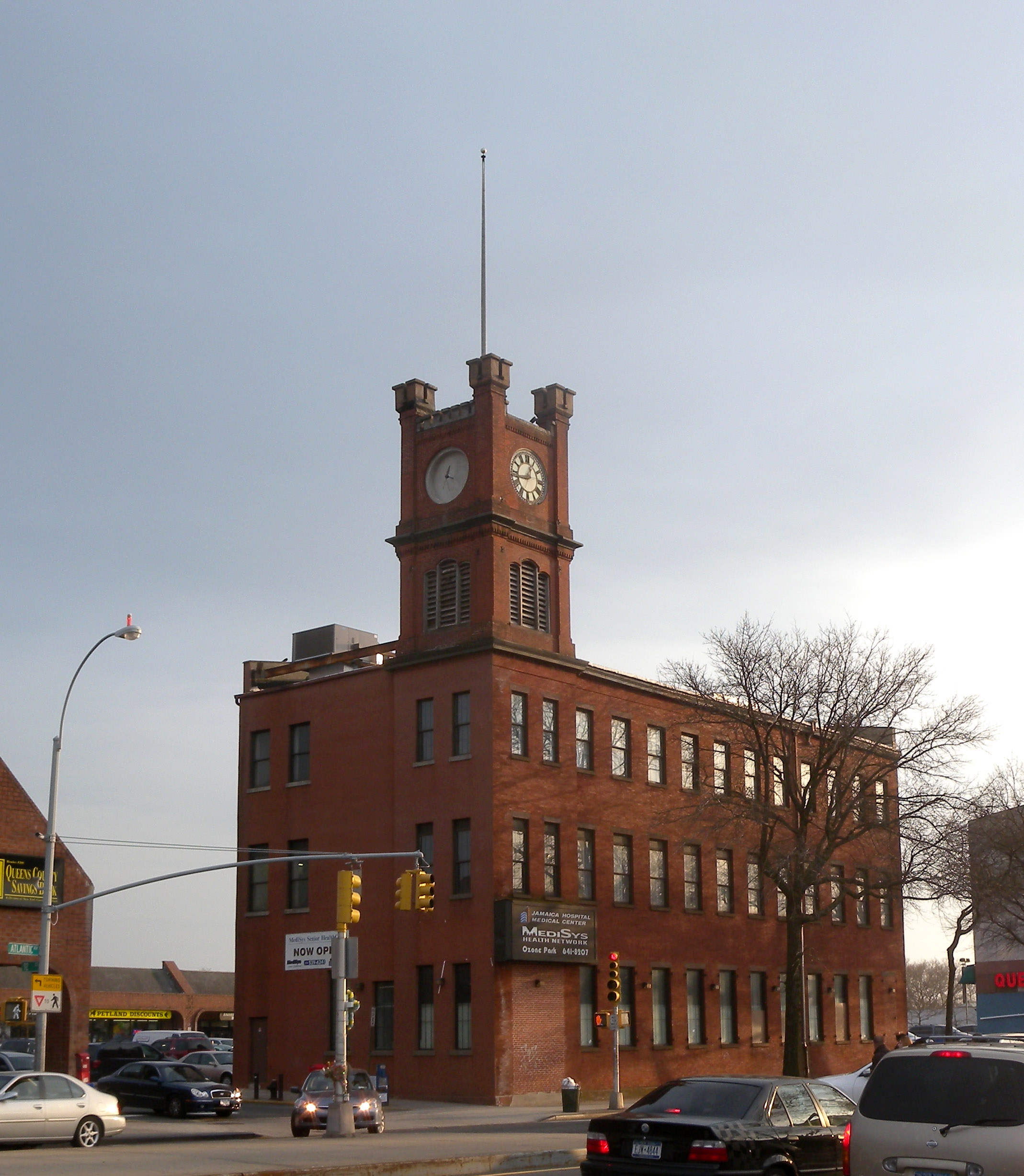
Historic clock tower built during the 1860s as part of the Lalance & Grosjean factory complex

An area now part of Ozone Park that pre-dated that community was called "Centreville". It was founded in the 1840s and was centered around Centreville Street and the Centreville Community Church. Part of Ozone Park is still called "Centreville".

In the 1870s, two immigrants from France named Charles Lalance and Florian Grosjean established a factory in Woodhaven where they manufactured cooking materials and porcelain enamelware. It burned down in 1876. Lalance and Grosjean built a second factory, as well as a hundred houses for workers, at Atlantic Avenue and 92nd Street in modern-day Ozone Park.

During the 1870s, an economic depression caused residents of New York City to look for better housing opportunities in the suburbs of Manhattan and Brooklyn, where housing would be cheaper. In 1880, the New York, Woodhaven & Rockaway Railroad began service on the Montauk Branch and Rockaway Beach Branch from Long Island City to Howard Beach, Queens. Two years later, two wealthy partners named Benjamin W. Hitchcock and Charles C. Denton bought plots of land around what would later become the Woodhaven Junction station. The Rockaway Beach Branch's Ozone Park station opened in 1883.

Advertisements for Ozone Park proclaimed that the development had "pure air" and "no malaria". Ozone Park was called "the Harlem of Brooklyn" because at the time, as Harlem was a thriving Jewish and Italian neighborhood. Hitchcock and Denton chose the "Ozone Park" name because in the 1880s, ozone was associated with breezes from the sea, and the Atlantic Ocean was located nearby.

=== Development ===
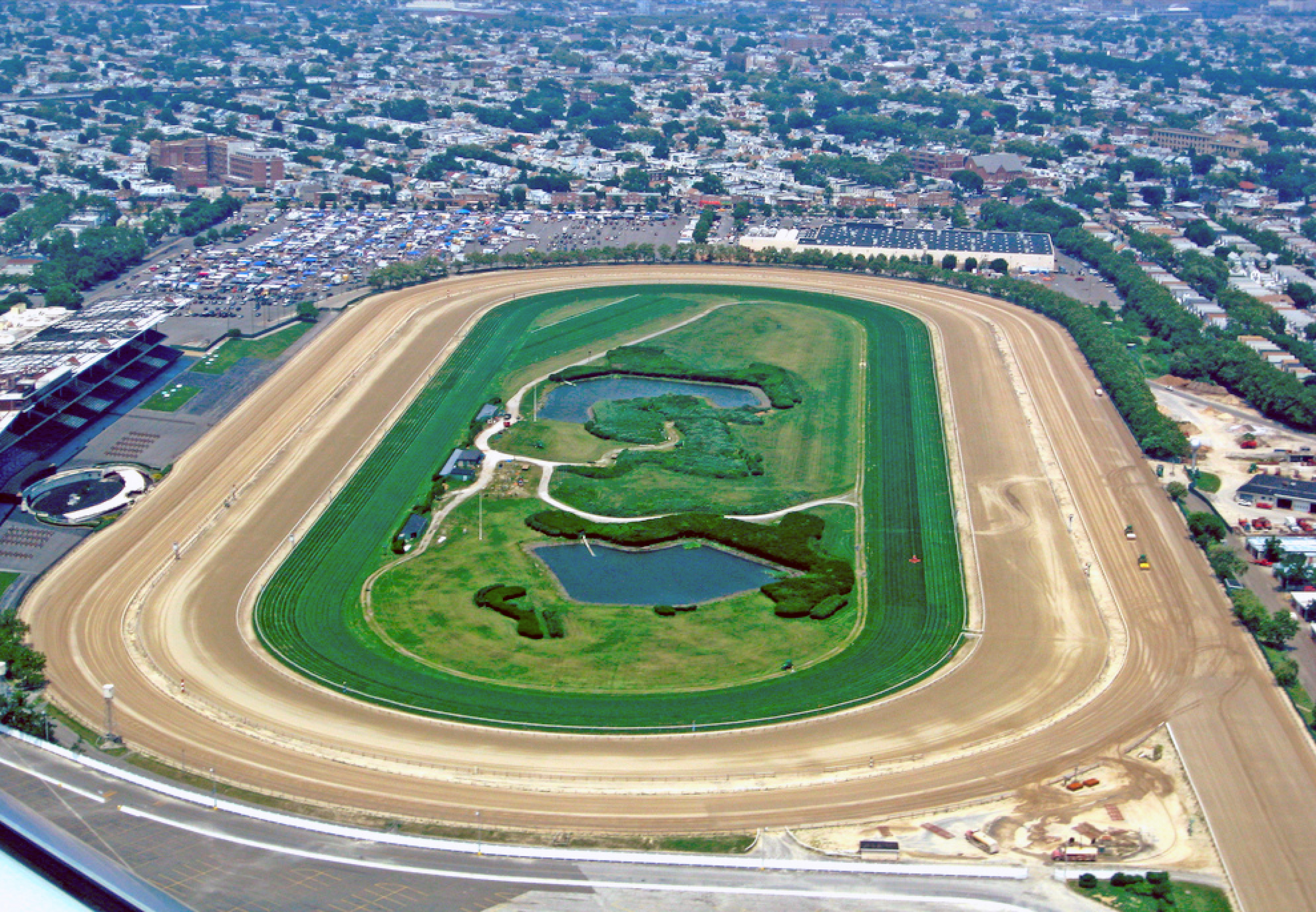
Aqueduct Racetrack, in Ozone Park

The Brooklyn Rapid Transit Company's Fulton Street elevated railroad line above Liberty Avenue opened in 1915, with a station at Lefferts Avenue (now Lefferts Boulevard). The elevated train system only charged a 5-cent fare. The nickel fare has been cited as a contributing factor in the development of Ozone Park, as residents could travel across the entire elevated and subway system for 5 cents. After the opening of the elevated line, real estate developers began buying up all the lots on either side of Liberty Avenue in hopes the new station would attract more people to want to live in Ozone Park.

Extensive housing construction occurred in the 1920s. The houses featured enclosed front porches, open back porches and stained-glass windows in the living rooms. Most of the houses were single family detached or semi-detached (sharing a common wall, often called a twin or a semi) built to roughly the same plan, with the living room, dining room and kitchen all in line and three bedrooms and a bath upstairs. The stairs were usually in the dining room.

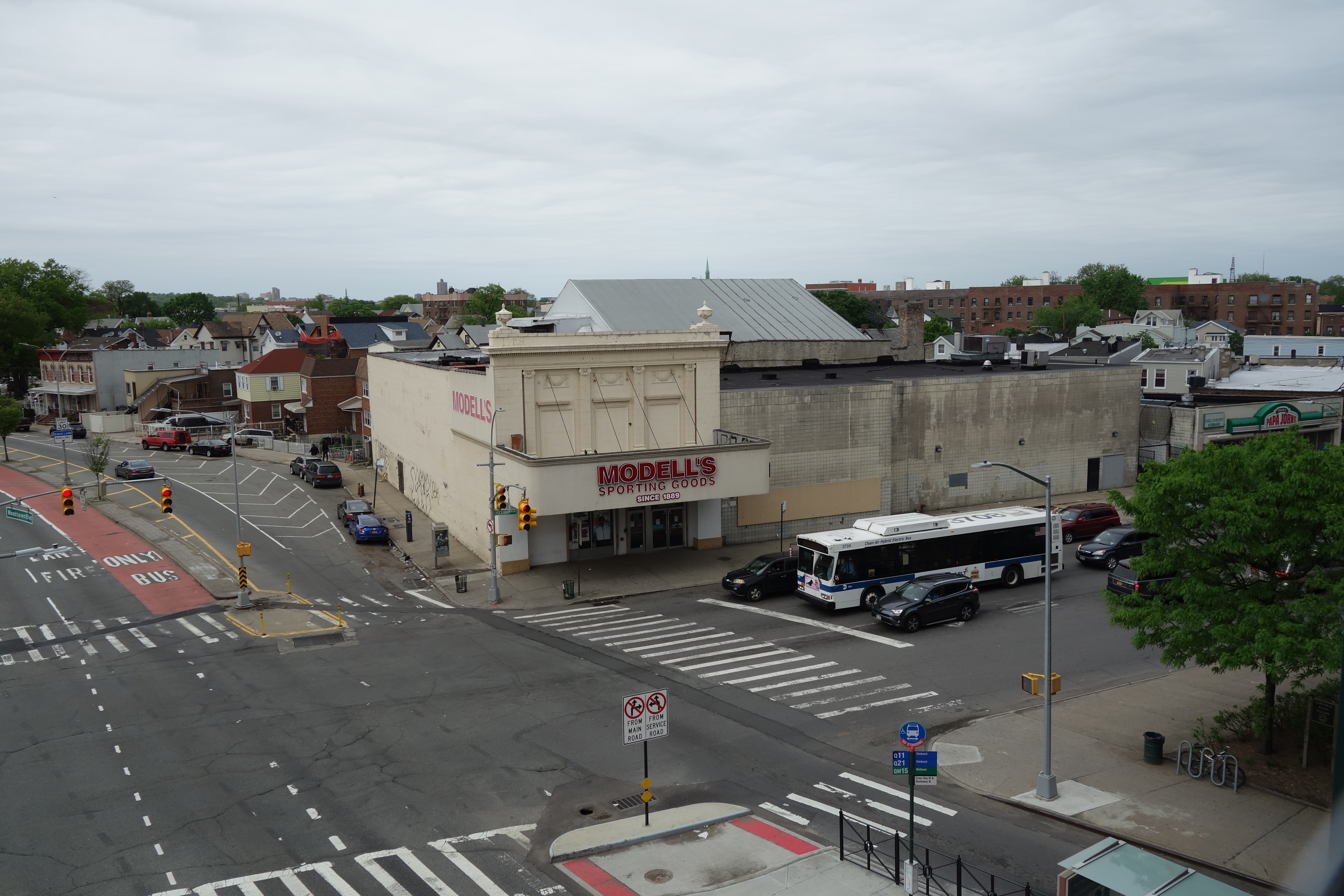
The former Cross Bay Movie Theater at Rockaway Boulevard in 2018, then adapted as a Modell's Sporting Goods store, now an outlet store for Raymour & Flanigan.

During the 1920s, Woodhaven Avenue was the main north–south artery in the area, though its southern terminus was at Liberty Avenue. In conjunction with the extension of Woodhaven Avenue to the Rockaway Peninsula, the avenue was widened to 150 feet (46 m) and renamed Woodhaven Boulevard. The extension itself, named Cross Bay Boulevard, opened to traffic in 1925.

Because Ozone Park was now more accessible by car, the land became much more valuable, leading to a construction boom . Between 1921 and 1930, Ozone Park saw a population increase of over 180% from 40,000 to 112,950 people.

With this increase in population came the need for schools and sources of entertainment. In response to this demand came the construction of John Adams High School in 1930. This school was built just as the construction boom slowed down and right before the Great Depression. The 1,800-seat Cross-Bay Movie Theatre opened in December 1924, and a 2,000-seat theater at 102nd Street and Liberty Avenue was also built during this time.

One area of Ozone Park is known as "The Hole", and includes the area bounded by 75th (Ruby) Street, South Conduit Avenue, 78th Street and Linden Boulevard. It is named as such because the houses in this area were built below grade, with a ground level that is 30 feet (9.1 m) lower than the surrounding area. The area is economically distressed, and suffers from frequent flooding. In the 1930s, the city of New York decided to install sewers and sewer lines in Ozone Park to stop the flooding that had become a major problem. In order to install the sewers, the houses had to be raised almost an entire floor. Owners were given a stipend to raise their homes but some chose not to do so. The first floor in some of the non-raised homes subsequently became basements. In 2004, the New York City Department of Environmental Protection made plans to connect the neighborhood to the city's sewer system to combat the flooding by raising the land.

=== Later years ===
The Centreville Community Church merged with the United Methodist Church of Ozone Park in 1957 and a new church, the Community Methodist Church of Ozone Park, was built at the Southeast corner of Sutter Avenue and Cross Bay Boulevard. It was completed for Christmas 1958. The old church and the property that surrounded it were sold to Aqueduct Racetrack and the old, historic church was torn down in mid-1959.

The Lalance and Grosjean factory closed in the 1960s and was left to deteriorate over two decades. In 1981, the factory complex was designated as a New York City Landmark. What remains is now "adaptively reused" as a medical clinic. Only the factory's old clock tower remains.

In 1996, a scandal broke surrounding two Ozone Park Jewish cemeteries, Mokom Sholom Cemetery and Bayside Cemetery, which share a coterminous tract bounded by 80th and 84th Streets and Liberty and Pitkin Avenues (the adjoining Acacia Cemetery was not involved). Allegations of the re-using of graves of long-dead mostly infants and small children from the mid-to-late 19th century, for re-sale to recent Russian Jewish immigrants, were made against the owners of Mokom Sholom. In addition, Mokom Sholom and Bayside had also been damaged by a combination of vandals, grave-robbers, and self-styled necromancers, though the former was affected to a greater extent. WABC-TV reported on damage to Mokom Sholom, while damage to Bayside was repaired through philanthropic efforts, headed by the late city councilman Al C. Stabile.

== Demographics ==
Based on data from the 2010 United States census, the population of Ozone Park was 21,376, an increase of 324 (1.5%) from the 21,052 counted in 2000. Covering an area of 576.32 acres (233.23 ha), the neighborhood had a population density of 37.1 inhabitants per acre (23,700/sq mi; 9,200/km^{2}).

The racial makeup of the neighborhood was 30.5% (6,511) White, 5.6% (1,188) African American, 0.4% (82) Native American, 19.4% (4,143) Asian, 0.0% (2) Pacific Islander, 2.6% (559) from other races, and 3.6% (779) from two or more races. Hispanic or Latino of any race were 37.9% (8,112) of the population.

The entirety of Community Board 10, which comprises Howard Beach, southern Ozone Park (south of 103rd Avenue), and South Ozone Park, had 125,603 inhabitants as of NYC Health's 2018 Community Health Profile, with an average life expectancy of 81.7 years. This is higher than the median life expectancy of 81.2 for all New York City neighborhoods. Most inhabitants are youth and middle-aged adults: 22% are between the ages of between 0–17, 28% between 25 and 44, and 28% between 45 and 64. The ratio of college-aged and elderly residents was lower, at 9% and 13% respectively.

As of 2017, the median household income in Community Board 10 was $73,891. In 2018, an estimated 19% of Ozone Park and Howard Beach residents lived in poverty, compared to 19% in all of Queens and 20% in all of New York City. One in ten residents (10%) were unemployed, compared to 8% in Queens and 9% in New York City. Rent burden, or the percentage of residents who have difficulty paying their rent, is 56% in Howard Beach and South Ozone Park, higher than the boroughwide and citywide rates of 53% and 51% respectively. Based on this calculation, as of 2018, Ozone Park and Howard Beach are considered to be high-income relative to the rest of the city and not gentrifying.

=== Demographic changes ===
Since its beginnings, Ozone Park has been largely populated by various groups of immigrants. The first wave were French immigrants associated with a pot factory on Atlantic Avenue. Germans and the Irish made up a large part of Ozone Park in the late 19th century and early 20th century. Eventually Italians started to migrate into Ozone Park from East New York, Brooklyn. Most of the current Italians in the neighborhood are originally from Brooklyn. A significant Polish population also developed based around Saint Stanislaus Bishop and Martyr Roman Catholic Church and its associated elementary school.

At the turn of the 21st century immigrants from Latin America, South Asia (Bangladesh), the West Indies, and South America (Indo-Guyanese & Indo-Surinamese) moved in, adding a diverse atmosphere to the neighborhood, which is especially apparent along 101st Avenue and Liberty Avenue near the neighborhood's border with Richmond Hill. The neighborhood was largely Italian-American; however, these new arrivals have made Ozone Park become one of the fastest-growing and most ethnically diverse neighborhoods in New York City. There is a large Hispanic population in Ozone Park, mainly concentrated in the northern portion of the neighborhood near the Woodhaven border, and an African-American minority, spread throughout the neighborhood.

Residents vary from working class to middle class families, who own or rent private homes on the neighborhood's tree-lined residential streets.

== Subsections ==
Census data from the late 18th century shows how Ozone Park was a sparsely populated neighborhood because of the lack of transportation. By 1915, the Fulton Street Line opened, connecting Ozone Park with the rest of New York City, thus starting the enormous influx by the Italians. Ozone Park then formed many smaller sub-neighborhoods with specific identities.

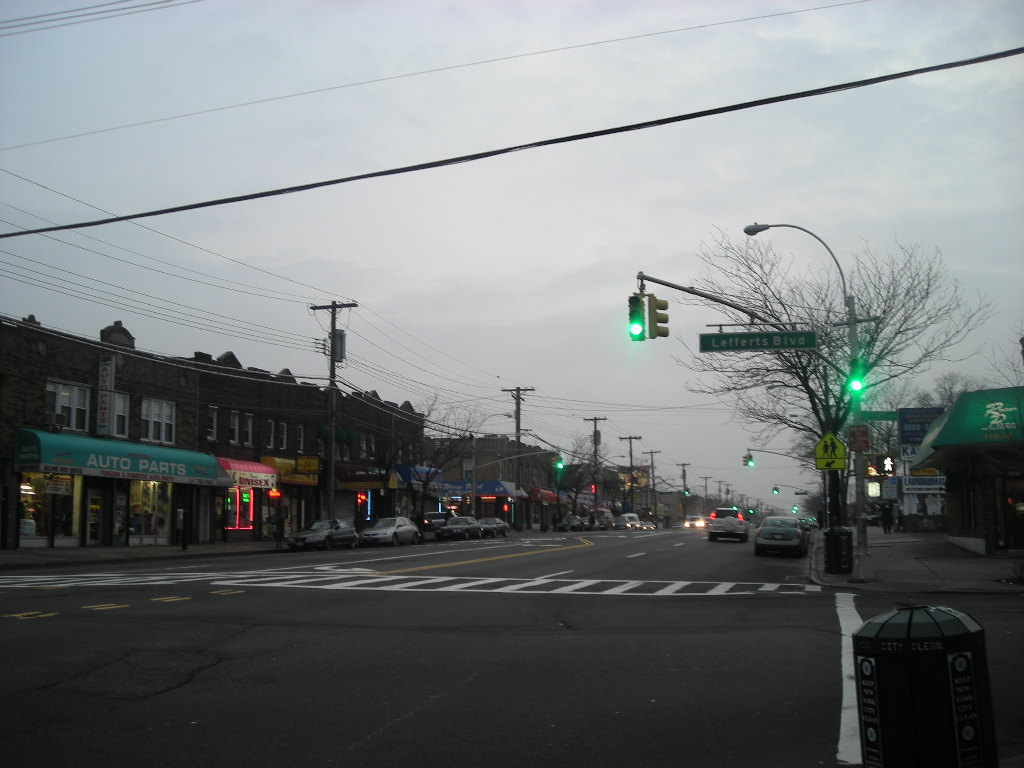
Rockaway Boulevard in South Ozone Park

=== Other sections ===
Centreville, which still uses this name, is bordered by Aqueduct on the east, Cross Bay Boulevard on the west, North Conduit Avenue on the south, and Rockaway Boulevard on the north. Liberty Heights is a triangular area bordered by Liberty Avenue on the south, diagonal-running 101st Avenue (Jerome Avenue) from the southwest to the northeast, and Woodhaven Boulevard to the east. Balsam Village was named after Balsam Farms, which sold off parcels of land for development, and is bordered by Liberty Avenue and North Conduit Avenue on the north, 84th Street on the west, and Cross Bay Boulevard on the east.

Tudor Village, in southwestern Ozone Park, is extremely small, consisting of approximately two hundred and fifty homes; it spans only five residential streets and two avenues. Its population consists mostly of Italian Americans. Its residents consist of approximately six hundred people. The village was incorporated in the late 1800s and has since flourished. Tudor Village hosts suburban tree-lined streets with what is referred to as the "Tudor Malls" in its center, boasting floral arrangements throughout.

The village is also home to Tudor Park, a 20-acre (81,000 m^{2}) recreational park which features a baseball field, racquetball courts, picnic area, and a fountain as well as a playground. Located on the southeast end of the village are another baseball field and benches and shaded areas for resting. Tudor Village is on the border of Howard Beach.

Also inside of Ozone Park are areas named Magnolia Court (95th Street and 150th Road), Park Village (Tahoe Street and North Conduit Avenue), Kaybern Court (97-52 75th Street), Ozone Plaza (84-23 103rd Avenue), Dumont Village (Dumont Avenue and 85th Street), Greentree Condos (Albert Road and 95 Street), Albert Gardens (94-20 Albert Road), Newlyn Estates (85-22 Dumont Avenue), and Sterling Manor (105-25 88th Street).

== Police and crime ==
Howard Beach, southern Ozone Park (south of 103rd Avenue), and South Ozone Park are patrolled by the 106th Precinct of the NYPD, located at 103-53 101 Street. The 106th Precinct ranked 26th safest out of 69 patrol areas for per-capita crime in 2010. The rate of car thefts is high because of the area's proximity to the Belt Parkway, a major travel corridor. As of 2018, with a non-fatal assault rate of 32 per 100,000 people, Howard Beach and South Ozone Park's rate of violent crimes per capita is less than that of the city as a whole. The incarceration rate of 381 per 100,000 people is lower than that of the city as a whole.

The 106th Precinct has a lower crime rate than in the 1990s, with crimes across all categories having decreased by 81.3% between 1990 and 2018. The precinct reported 6 murders, 16 rapes, 183 robberies, 246 felony assaults, 133 burglaries, 502 grand larcenies, and 97 grand larcenies auto in 2018.

In the 1980s, the 106th Precinct became the source and scene of several police brutality incidents, including the stun gunning of high schooler Mark Davidson on April 17, 1985, who was arrested on marijuana possession charges. One of the officers, Michael Aranda, accused of stun-gunning Davidson was later acquitted in 1991.

== Fire safety ==
New York City Fire Department (FDNY) fire station, Engine Co. 285/Ladder Co. 142, is located at 103-17 98th Street.

== Health ==
As of 2018, preterm births are more common in Ozone Park and Howard Beach than in other places citywide, though births to teenage mothers are less common. In Howard Beach and South Ozone Park, there were 97 preterm births per 1,000 live births (compared to 87 per 1,000 citywide), and 14.2 births to teenage mothers per 1,000 live births (compared to 19.3 per 1,000 citywide). Ozone Park and Howard Beach have a low population of residents who are uninsured. In 2018, this population of uninsured residents was estimated to be 8%, lower than the citywide rate of 12%.

The concentration of fine particulate matter, the deadliest type of air pollutant, in Ozone Park and Howard Beach is 0.0068 milligrams per cubic metre (6.8×10^{−9} oz/ft^{3}), less than the city average. Twelve percent of Ozone Park and Howard Beach residents are smokers, which is lower than the city average of 14% of residents being smokers. In Howard Beach and South Ozone Park, 27% of residents are obese, 19% are diabetic, and 34% have high blood pressure—compared to the citywide averages of 22%, 8%, and 23% respectively. In addition, 21% of children are obese, compared to the citywide average of 20%.

Eighty-three percent of residents eat some fruits and vegetables every day, which is less than the city's average of 87%. In 2018, 77% of residents described their health as "good", "very good", or "excellent", about equal to the city's average of 78%. For every supermarket in Howard Beach and South Ozone Park, there are 8 bodegas.

The nearest major hospitals are Brookdale University Hospital and Medical Center in Brooklyn and Jamaica Hospital in Jamaica.

== Post office and ZIP Codes ==
Ozone Park is covered by the ZIP Code 11416 north of 103rd Avenue and 11417 south of 103rd Avenue. The United States Post Office operates both zip codes out of the Ozone Park Station at 91-11 Liberty Avenue.

== Transportation ==
Numerous New York City Bus routes stop in the area, such as the Q7, Q8, Q11, Q24, Q41, Q51, Q52 SBS, Q53 SBS, Q112, QM15 and BM5. The B15, QM16 and QM17 run through the neighborhood without stopping. The New York City Subway's IND Fulton Street Line (A train) and IND Rockaway Line (A train) also run through the neighborhood.

== Politics and government ==
In the 2016 Presidential election, most precincts in Ozone Park voted for the Democratic Party candidate, Hillary Clinton, over her Republican Party opponent Donald Trump by a margin of over 50%.

Ozone Park is split between 5th, and 7th. These districts are represented by Gregory Meeks and Nydia Velázquez, respectively, as of 2018.

Ozone Park is part of the 10th, and 15th State Senate districts, represented by James Sanders Jr., and Joseph Addabbo Jr. respectively, and the 23rd, 31st, and 38th State Assembly districts, represented by Stacey Pheffer Amato, Khaleel Anderson, and Jenifer Rajkumar respectively. It is part of Districts 28, 29 and 32 in the New York City Council, respectively represented by Adrienne Adams Lynn Schulman and Joann Ariola.

== Education ==
Ozone Park and Howard Beach generally have a lower rate of college-educated residents than the rest of the city as of 2018. While 28% of residents age 25 and older have a college education or higher, 23% have less than a high school education and 49% are high school graduates or have some college education. By contrast, 39% of Queens residents and 43% of city residents have a college education or higher. The percentage of Ozone Park and Howard Beach students excelling in math rose from 33% in 2000 to 61% in 2011, and reading achievement rose from 37% to 48% during the same time period.

Ozone Park and Howard Beach's rate of elementary school student absenteeism is less than the rest of New York City. In Howard Beach and South Ozone Park, 18% of elementary school students missed twenty or more days per school year, lower than the citywide average of 20%. Additionally, 82% of high school students in Ozone Park and Howard Beach graduate on time, more than the citywide average of 75%.

=== Schools ===
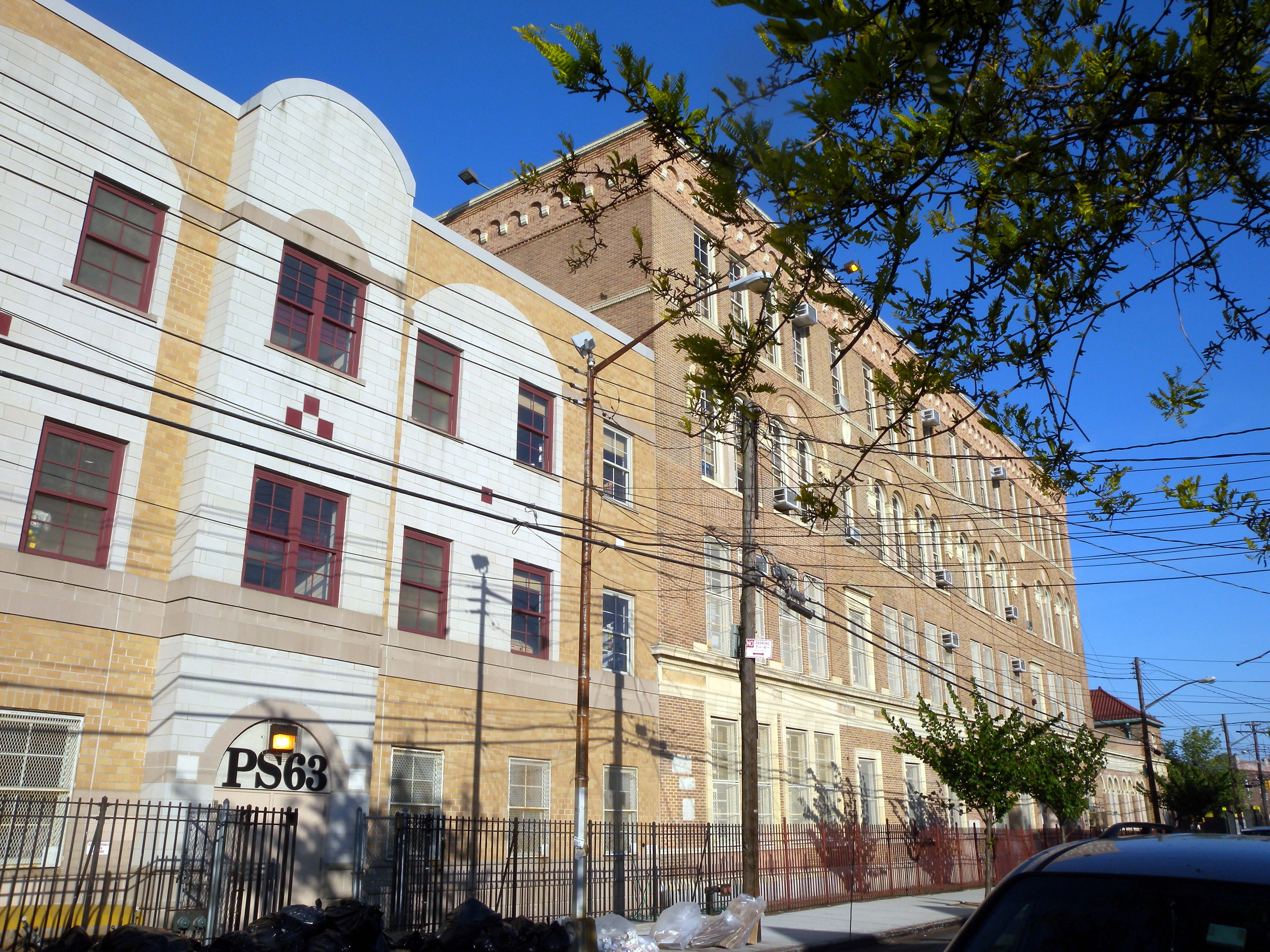
PS 63

==== Public schools ====
- PS 63 Old South School (grades Pre-K to 5, and special education)
- PS 64 Joseph P. Addabbo School (grades K-5, special education)
- PS 65 The Raymond York Elementary School (grades K-5)
- MS 137 America's School-Heroes (grades 6–8)
- MS 202 Robert H. Goddard (grades 6–8)
- JHS 210 Elizabeth Blackwell (grades 6–8)
- PS 316 Queens Explorers Elementary School (grades Pre-K to 5, and special education)
- Robert H. Goddard High School of Technology and Communications (grades 9–12)
- John Adams High School (grades 9–12)
- High School for Construction Trades, Engineering and Architecture (grades 9–12)
- PS 377 (grades 3K, Pre-K to 1)
- PS 335 (grades Pre-K to 5)

==== Private schools ====
- St Elizabeth's RC Elementary
- Divine Mercy Catholic Academy (originally Nativity B.V.M. and St. Stanislaus Schools, which were combined renamed in 2007)
- Little Dolphin Pre-School
- Our Lady of Perpetual Help Academy RC Elementary

==== Closed schools ====
- Nativity of the Blessed Virgin Mary Parish School
- Our Lady of Wisdom RC Secondary
- St. Mary Gate of Heaven RC Elementary
- St. Stanislaus Parish School

=== Library ===
Ozone Park library

The Queens Public Library operates the Ozone Park branch at 92-24 Rockaway Boulevard.

== In popular culture ==
Ozone Park has served as the setting and subject of numerous media works.

=== Film ===
- A Bronx Tale (1993) features a scene set at Aqueduct Racetrack.
- A Shock to the System (1990) contains a scene filmed in the old Aqueduct Racetrack station.
- Boss of Bosses (2001, starring Chazz Palminteri) features a scene with John Gotti in Ozone Park at the Bergin Hunt and Fish Club.
- Goodfellas (1990) is an Academy Award-winning gangster film that takes place in and around Ozone Park.
- Holy Rollers (2010) features external shots of the Gold and Zimmerman houses.
- Lucky Number Slevin (2006) contains a scene at the beginning, wherein the father and son are at Aqueduct Racetrack.
- This Is My Life (1992) starring Julie Kavner as Dottie Ingels living in Ozone Park

=== Television ===
- Getting Gotti (1994 TV film starring Lorraine Bracco) is based on a real-life woman, Diane Giacalone, who grew up in Ozone Park and through the years watched Gotti rise to power on the streets of Ozone Park; she eventually became an Assistant US Attorney and built up a case against him.
- The Perfect Crimes History Channel documentary features the Lufthansa heist and discusses the Lucchese crime family crews living, killing and running businesses in Ozone Park.

=== Notable events ===
- Pope John Paul II celebrated mass for 75,000 people at Ozone Park's Aqueduct Racetrack in October 1995.

== Notable people ==
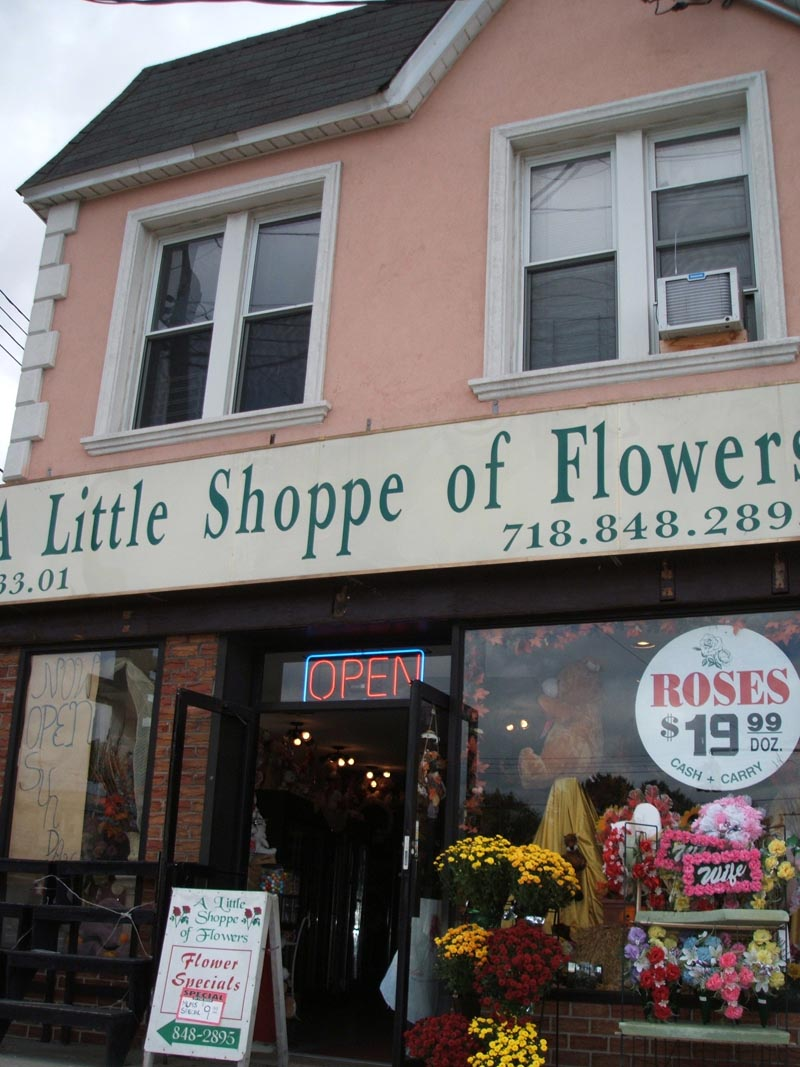
Jack Kerouac lived above this flower shop in Ozone Park. It was a drug store at the time.

Notable current and former residents of Ozone Park include:

- Joseph Patrick Addabbo (1925–1986), Congressman; P.S. 64 was named after him.
- Joseph Addabbo Jr. (born 1964), member of the New York State Senate from the 15th District and of the New York City Council from the 32nd Council District. He is the son of Joseph Patrick Addabbo.
- Pedro Beato (born 1986), relief pitcher of the Baltimore Orioles
- Charles Camarda (born 1952), astronaut, Mission Specialist on STS-114.
- The Capris, 1950s Doo Wop group, best known for "There's a Moon Out Tonight".
- Justin Credible (born 1973 as Peter Polaco), professional wrestler
- Gerald Edelman (1929–2014), 1972 winner of the Nobel Prize in Physiology or Medicine.
- Elizabeth Eden (1946–1987), real life character of Leon from the 1975 film Dog Day Afternoon.
- Peter Facinelli (born 1973), actor
- Mary Flaherty (1926–2000), player for two seasons in the All-American Girls Professional Baseball League.
- John Frascatore (born 1970), baseball player
- John Gotti (1940–2002), Mafia boss (headed the Gambino crime family)
- Neal Heaton (born 1960), former MLB baseball pitcher
- Carol Heiss (born 1940), Olympics figure skater
- Father Rob Keighron (born 1980), Roman Catholic priest, co-host/co-producer of The Catholic Guy
- Jack Kerouac (1922–1969) - writer, lived in Ozone Park with his parents at 133-01 Cross Bay Boulevard for 11 years after discharge from the U.S. Navy in 1943. He wrote his first novel, The Town and the City (1950), as well as the quintessential On the Road (1957), while living in Ozone Park. His friends jokingly called him "The Wizard of Ozone Park".
- Cyndi Lauper (born 1953), singer/actress.
- Jack Lord (1920–1998), actor, star of the 1960s Hawaii Five-0 TV series, attended John Adams High School located on Rockaway Boulevard in Ozone Park
- Joe Lo Truglio (born 1970), actor best known for his appearance on Brooklyn Nine-Nine.
- Bernadette Peters (born 1948), actress/singer.
- Joseph Pintauro (1930–2018), playwright, novelist and poet.
- Tom Postilio, real estate broker and star of HGTV's Selling New York.
- Matt Rand (born 1991), marathon runner
- John J. Santucci (1932–2016), lawyer and politician
- Nick Scotti (born 1966), actor, singer and model.
- Ronald Spadafora (1954–2018), FDNY Chief
- Anthony Trentacosta (1940–2005), Gambino crime family member
- Eric Ulrich (born 1985), member of the New York City Council from the 32nd Council District.
- Thomas Von Essen (born 1945), Senior Vice President at Giuliani Partners and 30th New York City Fire Commissioner.
- Debra Wilson (born 1962), actress, comedian, voice actress and TV presenter
