= Lynn Schulman =

American politician (born 1957)

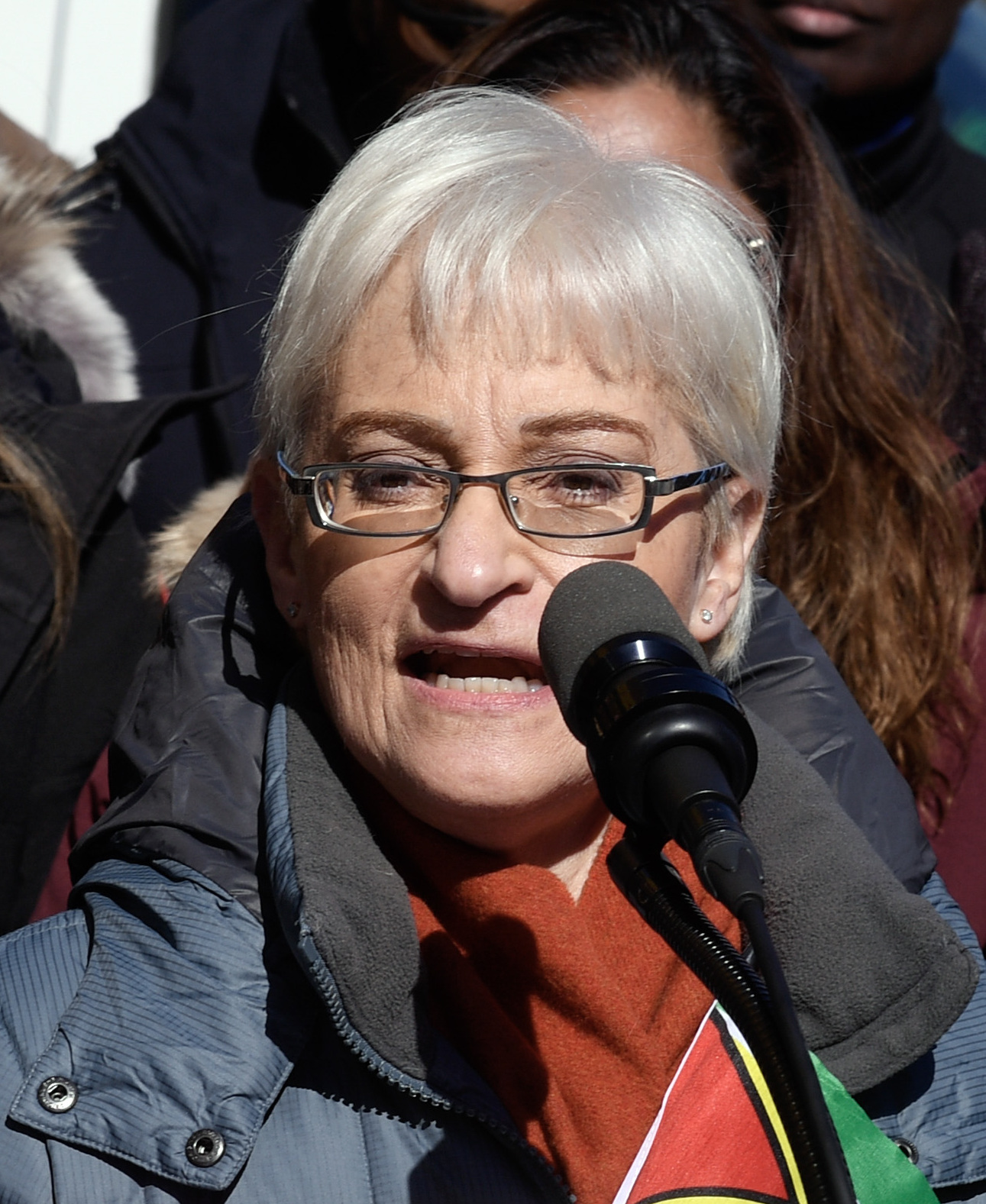

Member of the New York City Council from the 29th district
- Incumbent
- Assumed office January 1, 2022
- Preceded by: Karen Koslowitz

Personal details
- Born: November 4, 1957 (age 69) New York City, New York, U.S.
- Party: Democratic
- Domestic partner(s): Adelaide Connaughton (c. 1989; died 2018)
- Education: New York University (BA); Brooklyn Law School (JD)
- Website: Official website

Lynn Schulman (born November 4, 1957) is an American politician who is a member of the New York City Council. She was elected in November 2021 to represent the 29th district, which includes all or parts of the Queens neighborhoods of Forest Hills, Rego Park, Kew Gardens, and Richmond Hill. Her term began on January 1, 2022.

== Early life and education ==
Schulman was born in Queens, New York, and raised in the neighborhood of Forest Hills. She was educated in the New York City public school system, and her mother worked as a substitute teacher. She went on to graduate from New York University with a Bachelor of Arts degree in journalism and political science, and later from Brooklyn Law School with a Juris Doctor degree.

Schulman first became involved in politics when she campaigned for Bella Abzug, a member of the U.S. House of Representatives from New York seeking election to the Senate.

== Career ==
Schulman, an attorney, worked in various government and healthcare nonprofit roles prior to her election to the City Council. In New York City government, she served in the mayoral administration of Ed Koch and the offices of New York City Councilwomen Carol Greitzer and Sara M. Gonzalez. Schulman also worked in New York State government as an aide to New York State Assemblyman William F. Passannante. Schulman was then employed at the HIV/AIDS services nonprofit GMHC, before she managed business affairs at the Woodhull Medical Center for over a decade. Afterward, Schulman returned to New York City government, where she worked in the Office of the New York City Council Speaker until her inauguration.

Schulman also held multiple volunteer public service roles in Forest Hills. She served as vice chair of Queens Community Board 6 and as a member of the 112th Precinct Council, District 28 Community Education Council, and the Board of Directors of the Forest Hills Chamber of Commerce. Schulman gained local notoriety for her healthcare advocacy, which she said "was born out of the HIV/AIDS movement" and later influenced by her breast cancer diagnosis during her 2021 City Council campaign.

Schulman ran unsuccessfully for the City Council in 2001 and 2009 in the same district that she now represents. The New York Times editorial board endorsed Schulman during her 2009 campaign, writing, "Ms. Schulman argues more powerfully for better access to schools and more affordable housing and health care."

=== 2021 City Council campaign ===
During Schulman's 2021 primary campaign for the vacant 29th City Council district seat, she received influential endorsements from the Working Families Party, LGBTQ Victory Fund, U.S. Representative Grace Meng, and labor unions including 1199 SEIU United Health Care Workers East, the Communications Workers of America, the Freelancers Union, and the Retail Wholesale and Department Store Union.

Schulman defeated eight other candidates in a June 2021 Democratic primary, the first cycle in which ranked choice voting was implemented in New York City. She received 60.0 percent of the vote in the final round, and the results were certified the following month by the New York City Board of Elections. Schulman then advanced to the November 2021 general election, in which she defeated one candidate running on the Republican and Conservative party lines to win the position.

=== New York City Council (2022–present) ===
Schulman took office as a member of the New York City Council on January 1, 2022. She was named chair of the committee on health by Speaker Adrienne Adams soon after. Schulman also sits on the committees on aging, criminal justice, education, fire and emergency management, and governmental operations, as well as the subcommittee on zoning and franchises.

Schulman's primary legislative focuses have included increasing hospital capacity, protecting maternal rights, investing in green space, and improving government responses to public health crises, including the COVID-19 pandemic and the 2022-2023 monkeypox outbreak.

Schulman, who is Jewish and gay, is a member of the Jewish Caucus, LGBTQIA+ Caucus, and Women's Caucus.

In December 2024, amid a housing shortage in New York City, Schulman voted against Mayor Eric Adams’s zoning proposal to permit construction of 80,000 new housing units across the city. Lynn was one of 20 out of 51 members of the City Council to vote against the legislation. Parking minimums were also at issue in the debate.

In June 2025, Schulman endorsed Andrew Cuomo in the mayoral primary. Cuomo lost to Assemblyman Zohran Mamdani.

The Philippine American Democratic Club of New York endorsed Schulman for reelection prior to the June primary in 2025.

== Personal life ==
Schulman is a lesbian. Her partner of 29 years, Adelaide Connaughton, died in 2018.

== Electoral history ==
=== 2025 ===
2025 New York City Council election, District 29
Party	Candidate	Votes	%
Democratic	Lynn Schulman (incumbent)	28,866	72.3
Republican	Jonathan Rinaldi	10,906	27.3
Write-in		151	0.4
Total votes		39,923	100.0
Democratic hold			

=== 2023 ===
2023 New York City Council election, District 29
Party	Candidate	Votes	%
Democratic	Lynn Schulman (incumbent)	3,480	54.2
Democratic	Ethan Felder	2,204	34.3
Democratic	Sukhi Singh	683	10.6
Write-in		50	0.8
Total votes		6,417	100.0

2023 New York City Council election, District 29
Party	Candidate	Votes	%
Democratic	Lynn Schulman (incumbent)	8,195	68.1
Republican	Danniel S. Maio	2,917	24.2
Conservative	Danniel S. Maio	335	2.8
Total	Danniel S. Maio	3,252	27.0
Common Sense	Sukhi Singh	512	4.3
Write-in		76	0.6
Total votes		12,035	100.0
Democratic hold			

=== 2021 ===
2021 New York City Council Democratic primary, District 29
Party	Candidate	Maximum round	Maximum votes	Share in maximum round	Maximum votes First round votes Transfer votes
Democratic	Lynn Schulman	8	7,232	60.0%	
Democratic	Aleda F. Gagarin	8	4,825	40.0%	
Democratic	David Aronov	7	4,135	28.8%	
Democratic	Donghui Zang	6	3,012	19.2%	
Democratic	Avi Cyperstein	5	2,183	13.4%	
Democratic	Edwin K. Wong	4	1,541	9.3%	
Democratic	Douglas J. Shapiro	3	1,366	8.1%	
Democratic	Eliseo Dorion Labayen	2	692	4.0%	
Democratic	Sheryl Ann Fetik	2	487	2.8%	
Write-In		1	41	0.2%	

2021 New York City Council election, District 29
Party	Candidate	Votes	%
Democratic	Lynn Schulman	13,939	60.8
Republican	Michael Conigliaro (Note: Shared with "Save Our City" ballot line.)	8,058	35.1
Conservative	Michael Conigliaro	869	3.8
Total	Michael Conigliaro	8,927	38.9
Write-in		59	0.3
Total votes		22,925	100.0
Democratic hold			

=== 2009 ===
2009 New York City Council Democratic primary, District 29
Party	Candidate	Votes	%
Democratic	Karen Koslowitz	1,937	26.1
Democratic	Lynn Schulman	1,647	22.2
Democratic	Heidi Harrison Chain	1,442	19.4
Democratic	Michael Cohen	983	13.2
Democratic	Albert Cohen	950	12.8
Democratic	Melquiades Gagarin	464	6.2
Write-in		9	0.1
Total votes		7,432	100.0

2009 New York City Council election, District 29
Party	Candidate	Votes	%
Democratic	Karen Koslowitz	10,974	57.8
Independence	Karen Koslowitz	1,287	6.8
Total	Karen Koslowitz	12,261	64.6
Republican	Bartholomew F. Bruno	3,878	20.4
Working Families	Lynn Schulman	2,827	14.9
Write-in		5	0.0
Total votes		18,971	100.0
Democratic hold			

=== 2001 ===
2001 New York City Council Democratic primary, District 29
Party	Candidate	Votes	%
Democratic	Melinda R. Katz	7,958	72.2
Democratic	Lynn Schulman	3,055	27.7
Write-in		9	0.1
Total votes		11,022	100.0
