= Costa Constantinides =

American politician and attorney (born 1975)

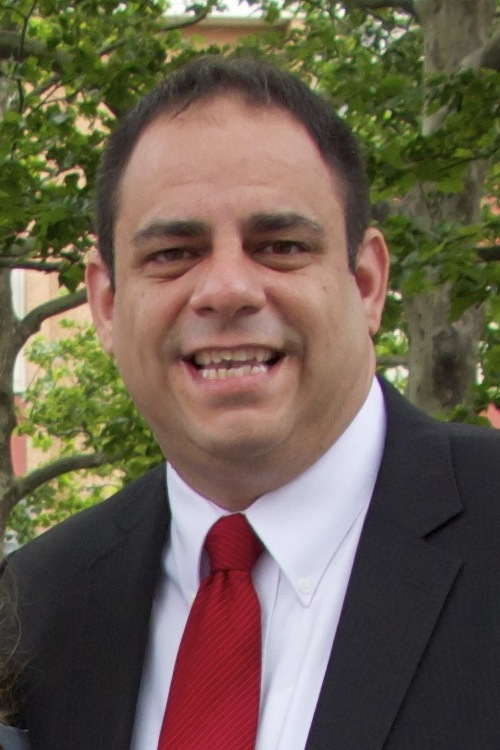
- Constantinides in 2013

Member of the New York City Council from the 22nd district
- In office January 1, 2014 – April 9, 2021
- Preceded by: Peter Vallone, Jr.
- Succeeded by: Tiffany Cabán

Personal details
- Born: January 7, 1975 (age 51) Queens, New York, U.S.
- Party: Democratic
- Spouse: Lori Constantinides
- Children: 1
- Education: Queens College (BA); Yeshiva University (JD)
- Website: Official

Costa Constantinides (born January 7, 1975) is an American politician and attorney who served as a member of the New York City Council from the 22nd district. The district includes Astoria, East Elmhurst, part of Long Island City, Rikers Island and part of Woodside in Queens.

In April 2021, Constantinides resigned before his term in office officially ended to become the chief executive officer of the Variety Boys and Girls Club of Queens.

== Early life and education ==
Constantinides was born and raised in Astoria, Queens. He attended local public schools P.S. 84 and P.S. 122, Constantinides graduated cum laude from Queens College with a bachelor's degree in political science and history. He then earned a Juris Doctor from the Benjamin Cardozo School of Law.

== Career ==
He was admitted to the New York State Bar Association in 2014.

Previously, Constantinides served as Deputy Chief of Staff to New York City Council Member James F. Gennaro of District 24. Constantinides is the first Greek-Cypriot American to hold elected office. Constantinides serves as the chair of the Committee on Environmental Protection in the New York City Council.

In 2013, Councilman Peter Vallone, Jr. was barred from seeking re-election due to term limits. Constantinides won the Democratic primary to succeed him and easily won the general election later that year to take the seat. He served as chair of the Environmental Protection Committee.

Constantinides was not able to seek re-election to the city council in 2020 due to term limits. After Melinda Katz was elected to serve as Queens County District Attorney, she was succeeded as Queens Borough President by Sharon Lee. Constantinides announced his candidacy for the special election to succeed Katz. Along with fellow council member Jimmy Van Bramer, Constantinides was defeated in the Democratic primary by Donovan Richards.

Costa resigned from the New York City Council on April 9, 2021, to head Variety Boys Girls Club.

Political offices
Preceded by Peter Vallone, Jr.	New York City Council, 22nd district 2014–2021	Succeeded by Tiffany Cabán
