= Vallone =

Vallone is a surname. Notable people with the surname include:

- Charles J. Vallone (1901–1967), Italian American judge
- Eleonora Vallone (born 1955), Italian actress and model
- John Vallone (1953–2004), American production designer and art director
- Paul Vallone (1967–2024), American politician
- Peppino Vallone (born 1949), Italian politician
- Peter Vallone Jr. (born 1961), American lawyer and politician
- Peter Vallone Sr. (born 1934), American politician
- Raf Vallone (1916–2002), Italian footballer and actor
- Roberto Vallone (1915–2001), Italian racing driver
