= Team New York Aquatics =

Team New York Aquatics (also referred to as TNYA) is a Masters level swim, water polo and diving team based in New York City to foster aquatic sports amongst gay, lesbian, bisexual, and transgender athletes and their heterosexual allies. TNYA has a membership of over 500 swimmers, divers, and water polo players. TNYA is recognized as the largest Masters level swim team in New York City and the largest LGBT swim team in the world.

TNYA was organized in 1988 as a New York membership not-for-profit in preparation for the Gay Games III held in Vancouver, British Columbia in 1990. Section 1.2 of the Bylaws of TNYA state that the mission of TNYA is (a) to support and develop lesbian, gay, bisexual, transgender and non-gay amateur athletes for national or international competition, (b) to promote participation in aquatic sports such as swimming, diving, water polo and synchronized swimming, among lesbian, gay, bisexual, transgender and non-gay individuals, (c) to provide an atmosphere where lesbian, gay, bisexual, transgender and non-gay athletes can practice together in mutual understanding and support, and (d) to provide an opportunity for athletes of all abilities to participate in organized practices and competitions in a team atmosphere and so to achieve their own goals in their aquatic sports.

TNYA is affiliated with U.S. Masters Swimming (USMS), USA Diving, and USA Water Polo (USAWP). TNYA competes in the International Gay and Lesbian Aquatics annual meet, the Gay Games held every four years, and a variety of regional and local competitions.

TNYA has 18 swim workouts per week at pools at Columbia University, John Jay College, Baruch College, and Long Island University, 2 polo practices at Chelsea Recreation Center and Flushing Meadows-Corona Park Aquatics Center, and 2 springboard diving practices at Columbia University and Flushing Meadows-Corona Park Aquatics Center. Members range in age from 20 to 85 years old. The minimum age to participate in Masters swimming and diving is 18.
