= 2019 Queens County District Attorney election =

Queens County District Attorney election, 2019
- November 5, 2019
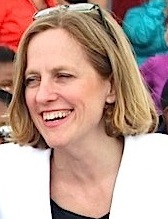

Candidate	Melinda Katz	Joe Murray
Party	Democratic	Republican
Popular vote	146,597	47,112
Percentage	74.9	24.1
- Katz: 40–50% 50–60% 60–70% 70–80% 80–90% >90% Murray: 50–60% 60–70% 70–80% 80–90% Tie: 40–50% No votes
District Attorney before election
Richard Brown
Democratic
Elected District Attorney
Melinda Katz
Democratic

The 2019 Queens County District Attorney election was held on November 5, 2019, to elect the Queens County District Attorney. The incumbent, Richard Brown, had announced in January 2019 that he would not seek an eighth term; Brown then died in office that May at the age of 86.

The Democratic primary election was held on June 25, 2019. Tiffany Cabán, a public defender and first-time candidate, led Queens borough president Melinda Katz and four other candidates after in-person votes were counted. However, on July 5, 2019, election officials said Katz pulled ahead in the final count, triggering a recount. Following the recount, Katz was declared the winner on July 29 by 60 votes.

== Democratic primary ==
=== Candidates ===
- Tiffany Cabán, public defender
- Melinda Katz, borough president of Queens since 2014
- Rory Lancman, member of the New York City Council since 2014, former member of the New York State Assembly (withdrew on June 21, endorsed Katz; remained on the ballot)
- Greg Lasak, former judge and former senior borough prosecutor
- Betty Lugo, former Nassau County prosecutor
- Mina Malik, former prosecutor and former deputy attorney general for the District of Columbia
- Jose Nieves, former deputy chief of the special investigations and prosecutions unit of the New York department of law

=== Endorsements ===
Tiffany Cabán

Federal politicians

- Bernie Sanders, U.S. Senator from Vermont since 2007
- Elizabeth Warren, U.S. Senator from Massachusetts since 2013
- Alexandria Ocasio-Cortez, member of the U.S. House from New York's 14th district since 2019

District attorneys

- Larry Krasner, district attorney of Philadelphia since 2018
- Rachael Rollins, district attorney of Suffolk County, Massachusetts since 2019

City-wide officials

- Scott Stringer, comptroller of New York City since 2014

City representatives

- Brad Lander, member of the New York City Council from the 39th district since 2010
- Carlos Menchaca, member of the New York City Council from the 38th district since 2014
- Jimmy Van Bramer, member of the New York City Council from the 26th district since 2010

State senators

- Jessica Ramos, member of the New York State Senate from the 13th district since 2019
- Gustavo Rivera, member of the New York State Senate from the 33rd district since 2011
- Julia Salazar, member of the New York State Senate from the 18th district since 2019
- James Sanders, Jr., member of the New York State Senate from the 10th district since 2013
- Luis Sepúlveda, member of the New York State Senate from the 32nd district since 2018

State assembly members

- Harvey Epstein, member of the New York State Assembly from the 74th district since 2018
- Ron Kim, member of the New York State Assembly from the 40th district since 2013
- Yuh-Line Niou, member of the New York State Assembly from the 65th district since 2017
- Dan Quart, member of the New York State Assembly from the 73rd district since 2011

Individuals

- Cynthia Nixon, actress and activist, candidate for governor of New York in 2018
- Linda Sarsour, civil rights activist
- Zephyr Teachout, attorney and law professor, candidate for governor of New York in 2014 and attorney general of New York in 2018

Organizations

- Democratic Socialists of America
- The New York Times
- Our Revolution
- Progressive Change Campaign Committee
- Working Families Party
- Citizen Action of New York
- Real Justice
- Make the Road

=== Results ===
As of 11:30 pm, June 25, 2019, Tiffany Cabán held a 1.3% lead over Melinda Katz, with 99.5% of the precincts reporting. Katz promised a recount. After absentee and provisional ballots were counted, the lead had switched to Katz 34,898 votes to Cabán's 34,878, pending another recount and challenge of provisional votes promised by Cabán's campaign. Following the recount, Katz was declared the winner by 60 votes on July 29.

Results by state assembly district Katz—50–60% Katz—40–50% Cabán—40–50% Cabán—50–60% Cabán—60–70% Cabán—70–80%

Queens County district attorney, Democratic primary, 2019
Party	Candidate	Votes	%
Democratic	Melinda Katz	34,920	38.57%
Democratic	Tiffany Cabán	34,860	38.50%
Democratic	Greg Lasak	13,048	14.41%
Democratic	Mina Malik	3,526	3.89%
Democratic	Rory Lancman	1,415	1.56%
Democratic	Jose Nieves	1,210	1.34%
Democratic	Betty Lugo	1,095	1.21%
Total votes		90,074	100.00%

== Republican primary ==
Daniel Kogan won the Republican primary unopposed.

Kogan accepted a nomination to become a judge, and stepped aside. The Republican party replaced him as their candidate for district attorney with Joe Murray in August 2019.

== General election ==
=== Results ===
Queens County district attorney, 2019
Party	Candidate	Votes	%
Democratic	Melinda Katz	146,597	74.9
Republican	Joe Murray	47,112	24.1
Total votes		195,749	100.0
Democratic hold			
