= Arthur Katzman =

American politician (1903–1993)

Member of the New York City Council from the 29th district
- In office 1962–1991
- Preceded by: George J. Schneider
- Succeeded by: Karen Koslowitz

Personal details
- Born: September 21, 1903 Davyd-Haradok, Russian Empire
- Died: August 29, 1993 (aged 89) Mountain View, California, U.S.
- Party: Democratic
- Education: Brooklyn Law School (LLB)

Arthur J. Katzman (1903 – 1993) was an American politician and attorney who served as a member of the New York City Council representing the 29th district, which includes Forest Hills, Rego Park, Kew Gardens and parts of Maspeth, Richmond Hill and Elmhurst.

== Early life and education ==
Katzman was born on September 21, 1903, in Davyd-Haradok, Russian Empire and emigrated to the United States with his family when he was five. Their first home in New York City was in Brownsville, Brooklyn. Katzman graduated from Brooklyn Law School.

== Career ==
After graduating from law school, Katzman established a law practice in Forest Hills, Queens. Katzman served as a member of the New York City Council from 1962 until his retirement in 1991. Katzman ran as an insurgent Reform Democrat against incumbent George J. Schneider.

Among his first achievements in office was legislation that provided funding for Yellowstone Municipal Park, and its playground that was later named after Katzman. At the time of his retirement, he was the oldest serving member of the City Council.

== Death ==
He died on August 29, 1993, at his daughter's home in Mountain View, California.
