= 2023 Queens County District Attorney election =

Queens County District Attorney election, 2023
- November 7, 2023

Candidate	Melinda Katz	Michael Mossa	George Grasso
Party	Democratic	Republican	Public Safety Party (Note: Grasso lost to Katz in the Democratic primary, but contested the general election as an independent under the third-party ballot line 'Public Safety Party')
Alliance		Conservative
Popular vote	101,181	40,563	7,529
Percentage	67.1%	26.9%	5.0%
- Katz: 40–50% 50–60% 60–70% 70–80% 80–90%
District Attorney before election
Melinda Katz
Democratic
Elected District Attorney
Melinda Katz
Democratic

The 2023 Queens County District Attorney election was held on November 7, 2023, to elect the Queens County District Attorney. The incumbent, Melinda Katz, ran for a second term.

The Democratic primary election was held on June 27, 2023, with Katz securing the nomination in a landslide victory. She went on to beat Republican Michael Mossa and Independent George Grasso by a comfortable majority in the general election.

== Democratic primary ==
=== Candidates ===
==== Nominee ====
- Melinda Katz, incumbent District Attorney

==== Eliminated in primary ====
- George Grasso, former judge (ran as an independent)
- Devian Shondel Daniels, attorney

=== Endorsements ===
Melinda Katz

U.S. representatives

- Gregory Meeks, NY-5 (1998–present)
- Grace Meng, NY-6 (2013–present)

Statewide officials

- Kathy Hochul, governor of New York (2021–present)

Local officials

- Eric Adams, mayor of New York City (2022–present)
- Donovan Richards, Queens Borough President (2020–present)

Labor unions

- 1199SEIU United Healthcare Workers East
- District Council 37
- International Brotherhood of Electrical Workers Local 3
- Enterprise Association of Steamfitters Local 638
- International Union of Operating Engineers Locals 14, 15, 30, 94, 211, 891
- Hotel Trades Council
- Mason Tenders’ District Council
- Uniformed Firefighters Union
- New York State Court Officers Association
George Grasso

Executive branch officials

- William Bratton, Chair of the Homeland Security Advisory Council (2020–present) and former NYPD Commissioner (1994–1996, 2014–2016)

Labor unions

- Retired Police Association of NY
- Retired Lieutenants Association

Organizations

- New York City Residents Alliance
- Asian Wave Alliance

=== Results ===
Queens County district attorney, Democratic primary, 2023
Party	Candidate	Votes	%
Democratic	Melinda Katz	44,601	71.0%
Democratic	George Grasso	8,969	14.3%
Democratic	Devian Shondel Daniels	8,799	14.0%
Write-in		448	0.7%
Total votes		62,817	100.0%

== Republican Party ==
The Republican primary election was canceled, as Michael Mossa was the only candidate contesting the nomination.

=== Candidates ===
==== Nominee ====
- Michael Mossa, attorney

== Third parties and independents ==
=== Conservative Party ===
==== Nominee ====
- Michael Mossa, attorney

=== Independents ===
==== Declared ====
- George Grasso, former judge

== General election ==
=== Results ===
Queens County district attorney, 2019
Party	Candidate	Votes	%
Democratic	Melinda Katz	101,181	67.1%
Republican	Michael Mossa	36,280	24.10%
Conservative	Michael Mossa	4,283	2.84%
Total	Michael Mossa	40,563	26.94%
Public Safety	George Grasso	7,529	5.0%
Write-in		1,145	1.0%
Total votes		150,718	100.0%
Democratic hold			
