= New York City Council Women's Caucus =

Caucus within the New York City Council

The Women's Caucus is a caucus of female-identified members of the New York City Council. According to the Caucus, it seeks "to advance women's rights and promotes the goal of equality in New York CIty through influences in public policy through education, legislation, and advocacy." The Caucus submits an annual list of funding priority recommendations to the New York City Council Speaker's office so that the budget will address the needs of organizations serving the Caucus' constituencies.

== Current members ==
Name	Party	Leadership Position
Julie Menin	Democratic	Co-Chair
Carmen De La Rosa	Democratic	Co-Chair
Carlina Rivera	Democratic	
Gale Brewer	Democratic	
Diana Ayala	Democratic	
Kristy Marmorato	Republican	
Sandra Ung	Democratic	
Pierina Sanchez	Democratic	
Althea Stevens	Democratic	
Amanda Farías	Democratic	
Vickie Paladino	Republican	
Tiffany Cabán	Democratic	
Linda Lee	Democratic	
Julie Won	Democratic	
Nantasha Williams	Democratic	
Lynn Schulman	Democratic	
Selvena Brooks-Powers	Democratic	
Joann Ariola	Republican	
Jennifer Gutiérrez	Democratic	
Crystal Hudson	Democratic	
Sandy Nurse	Democratic	
Shahana Hanif	Democratic	
Rita Joseph	Democratic	
Darlene Mealy	Democratic	
Susan Zhuang	Democratic	
Farah Louis	Democratic	
Mercedes Narcisse	Democratic	
Kamillah Hanks	Democratic	
Inna Vernikov	Republican	

== Activity ==
In May 2013, the Caucus introduced a resolution at a New York City Council meeting calling for Harriet Tubman to replace Andrew Jackson on the twenty-dollar bill, which was part of a larger nationwide initiative organized by a nonprofit called "Women on 20s".

In November 2016, the Caucus presented a legislative package of 11 bills and resolutions to the New York City Council addressing equal rights and opportunities for women. Issues addressed in the package included the needs of unpaid caregivers, access to feminine hygiene products, services for victims of domestic violence and sexual assault and the gender pay gap.
