= Yellowstone Park (Queens) =

Public park in New York City

- Interactive map of Yellowstone Park
- Location: Forest Hills, Queens, New York City
- Coordinates: 40.7263°N 73.8476°W
- Area: 1.75 acres (0.71 ha)
- Opened: May 27, 1968
- Operator: New York City Department of Parks and Recreation

Yellowstone Park is a small (1.75-acre (0.71 ha)) municipal park in Forest Hills, a neighborhood in the New York City borough of Queens.

== Description ==
The park is bounded by Yellowstone Boulevard, 68th Avenue, and 68th Road. Land for the park was acquired by the city in 1964 with the park opening to the public on May 27, 1968. The park contains Basketball courts, restrooms, playgrounds, and a dog-friendly area. The park's playground is named after City Council member Arthur Katzman, who advocated for construction of a park on the site.

The park was designed by the architecture firm of Coffey, Levine, and Blumberg. A $800,000 renovation of the park was completed in 1996, which was initiated by City Council member Karen Koslowitz.
