= New York's 28th State Assembly district =

American legislative district

Assemblymember
Andrew Hevesi; D–Forest Hills
- Registration: 54.5% Democratic; 17.1% Republican; 24.9% No party preference
- Demographics: 49% White; 3% Black; 22% Hispanic; 23% Asian; 0% Native American; 0% Hawaiian/Pacific Islander; 1% Other; 2% Multiracial
- Population (2020): 131,197
- Registered voters: 84,243

New York's 28th State Assembly district is one of the 150 districts in the New York State Assembly. It has been represented by Democrat Andrew Hevesi since 2005.

== Geography ==
=== 2020s ===
District 28 is located in Queens, and surrounds most of the neighborhoods of Forest Hills, Rego Park, Middle Village, and parts of Briarwood, Glendale and Ridgewood.

The district overlaps with New York's 5th, 6th and 7th congressional districts, the 12th, 14th and 15th districts of the New York State Senate, and the 29th, 30th, and 32nd districts of the New York City Council.

=== 2010s ===
The district is composed of Forest Hills, Rego Park, Middle Village, and parts of Glendale and Ridgewood.

== Recent election results ==
=== 2026 ===
2026 New York State Assembly election, District 28
Primary election
Party	Candidate	Votes	%
Democratic	Andrew Hevesi (incumbent)	7,096	87.8
Democratic	Jonathan Rinaldi	944	11.7
Write-in		41	0.5
Total votes		8,081	100.0
General election
Democratic	Andrew Hevesi (incumbent)		
4 Our Immigrants	David Kemp		
No Kings	Jonathan Rinaldi		
Write-in			
Total votes			100.0

=== 2024 ===
2024 New York State Assembly election, District 28
Party	Candidate	Votes	%
Democratic	Andrew Hevesi (incumbent)	28,276	58.4
Republican	Jonathan Rinaldi	19,158	
Common Sense	Jonathan Rinaldi	547	
Truth	Jonathan Rinaldi	195	
Total	Jonathan Rinaldi	19,900	41.1
Write-in		217	0.5
Total votes		48,393	100.0
Democratic hold			

=== 2022 ===
2022 New York State Assembly election, District 28
Primary election
Party	Candidate	Votes	%
Democratic	Andrew Hevesi (incumbent)	5,305	69.0
Democratic	Ethan Felder	2,368	30.8
Write-in		14	0.2
Total votes		7,687	100.0
General election
Democratic	Andrew Hevesi	18,236	
Working Families	Andrew Hevesi	2,314	
Total	Andrew Hevesi (incumbent)	20,550	58.2
Republican	Michael Congliaro	13,611	
Conservative	Michael Congliaro	1,093	
Total	Michael Congliaro	14,704	41.7
Write-in		30	01
Total votes		35,284	100.0
Democratic hold			

=== 2020 ===
2020 New York State Assembly election, District 28
Party	Candidate	Votes	%
Democratic	Andrew Hevesi (incumbent)	34,634	86.0
COVID-19 Stories	Danniel Maio	5,384	13.4
Write-in		245	0.6
Total votes		40,263	100.0
Democratic hold			

=== 2018 ===
2018 New York State Assembly election, District 28
Primary election
Party	Candidate	Votes	%
Working Families	Andrew Hevesi (incumbent)	6	85.7
Working Families	Danniel Maio	1	14.3
Write-in		0	0.0
Total votes		7	100.0
General election
Democratic	Andrew Hevesi	22,374	
Working Families	Andrew Hevesi	1,328	
Total	Andrew Hevesi (incumbent)	23,702	73.1
Republican	Danniel Maio	8,441	
Reform	Danniel Maio	141	
In Maio We Trust	Danniel Maio	106	
Total	Danniel Maio	8,688	26.8
Write-in		51	0.1
Total votes		32,441	100.0
Democratic hold			

=== 2016 ===
2016 New York State Assembly election, District 28
Party	Candidate	Votes	%
Democratic	Andrew Hevesi	29,515	
Working Families	Andrew Hevesi	3,395	
Total	Andrew Hevesi (incumbent)	32,910	99.21
Write-in		261	0.78
Total votes		33,171	100.0
Democratic hold			

=== 2014 ===
2014 New York State Assembly election, District 28
Party	Candidate	Votes	%
Democratic	Andrew Hevesi	10,488	
Working Families	Andrew Hevesi	1,721	
Total	Andrew Hevesi (incumbent)	12,209	98.7
Write-in		156	1.3
Total votes		12,365	100.0
Democratic hold			

=== 2012 ===
2012 New York State Assembly election, District 28
Party	Candidate	Votes	%
Democratic	Andrew Hevesi	24,705	
Working Families	Andrew Hevesi	2,103	
Total	Andrew Hevesi (incumbent)	26,808	99.6
Write-in		98	0.4
Total votes		26,906	100.0
Democratic hold			

=== 2010 ===
2010 New York State Assembly election, District 28
Primary election
Party	Candidate	Votes	%
Democratic	Andrew Hevesi (incumbent)	3,350	60.30
Democratic	Joseph Fox	2,197	39.55
Write-in		8	0.14
Total votes		5,555	100.0
General election
Democratic	Andrew Hevesi	13,249	
Working Families	Andrew Hevesi	988	
Total	Andrew Hevesi (incumbent)	14,237	62.25
Republican	Aleksander Powietrzynski	6,716	
Conservative	Aleksander Powietrzynski	862	
Total	Aleksander Powietrzynski	7,578	33.14
Independence	Joseph Triaco	1,017	4.45
Write-in		38	0.17
Total votes		22,870	100.0
Democratic hold			

=== Federal results in Assembly District 28 ===
Year	Office	Results
2024	President	Harris 55.0 - 43.3%
2024	Senate	Gillibrand 58.7 - 40.6%
2022	Senate	Schumer 59.6 - 39.7%
2020	President	Biden 62.6 - 36.2%
2018	Senate	Gillibrand 72.7 - 27.2%
2016	President	Clinton 63.9 – 32.3%
2016	Senate	Schumer 74.4 - 23.1%
2012	President	Obama 64.4 - 34.0%
2012	Senate	Gillibrand 73.5 - 24.8%
