= The Judge Charles J. Vallone School =

Judge Charles J. Vallone School

Location
- 23-70 31st St; Long Island City, Queens County, New York 11105; United States; 40.7731°N 73.9149°W

Information
- Former name: Humphry Davy School
- Type: Theater arts and technology magnet elementary school
- Motto: Where the genius in each child is developed toward academic excellence
- Established: 1907
- Status: Open
- School district: New York City Geographic District #30
- NCES District ID: 3600102
- Educational authority: New York City Department of Education
- School number: 85
- School code: NY-343000010000-343000010085
- NCES School ID: 360010202330
- Principal: Ann Gordon-Chang
- Faculty: 34 (on an FTE basis)
- Grades: PK-5
- Gender: Mixed
- Age range: 4-11
- Enrollment: 566 (2022-2023)
  - Pre-kindergarten: 29
  - Kindergarten: 83
  - Grade 1: 87
  - Grade 2: 97
  - Grade 3: 93
  - Grade 4: 92
  - Grade 5: 85
- Average class size: 30
- Student to teacher ratio: 16.65:1
- Hours in school day: 7
- Campus type: Urban
- Website: www.ps85q.org
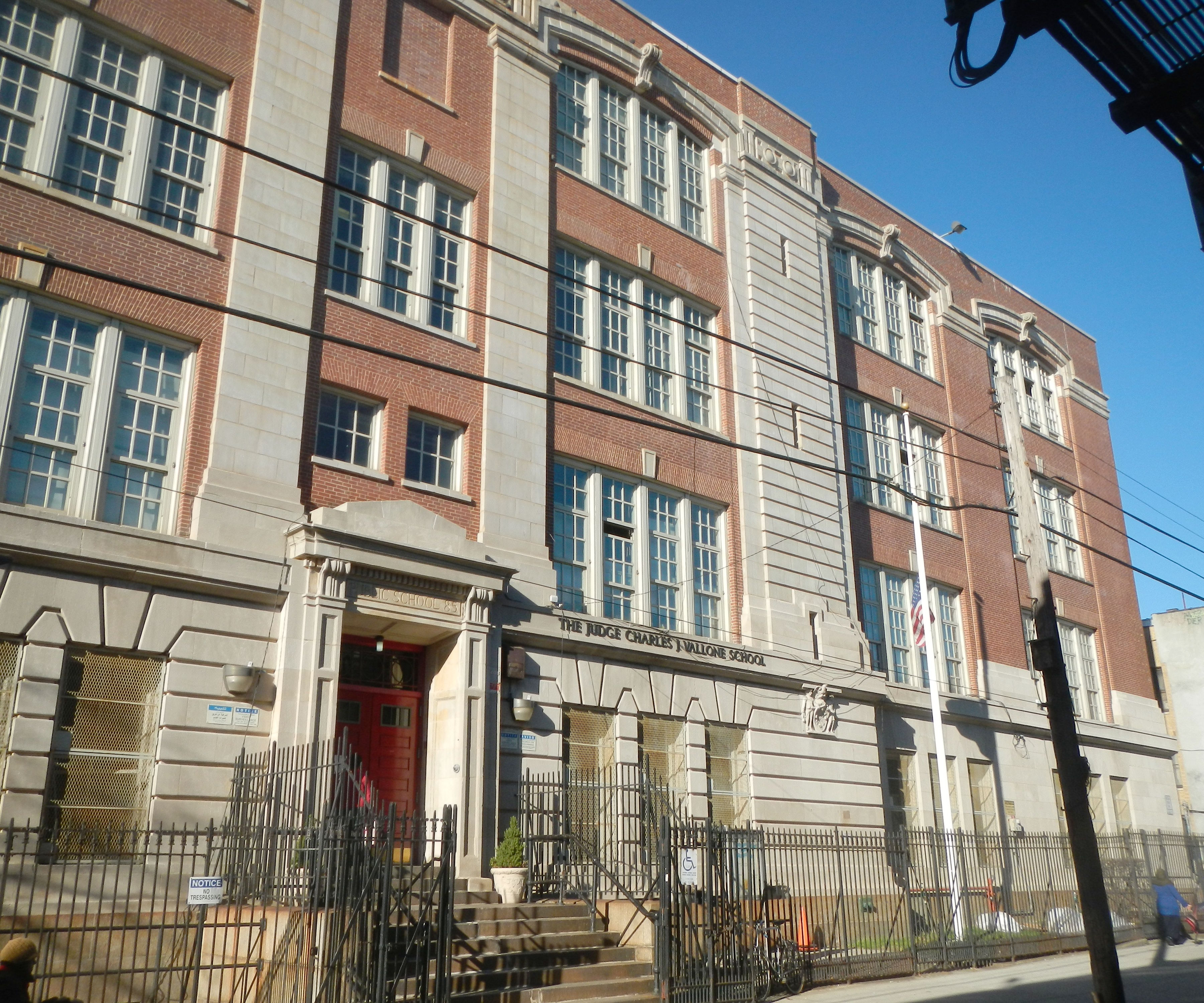

The Judge Charles J. Vallone School, formerly the Humphry Davy School, is Public School 85 in Long Island City, Queens, New York, United States.

== History ==
Located in Astoria, Queens, the school was built in 1907. The school was dedicated to Judge Charles J. Vallone on February 18, 1988. Before 1988, it was named after Humphry Davy, a British scientist.

== Admissions ==
The school serves approximately 566 students from pre-kindergarten to fifth grade, coming from over 40 different countries and speaking at least 14 different languages. 13.5% of newly admitted students are recent immigrants. 117 students are English Language Learners, 16 of whom are special education students.
