= Chelsea Recreation Center =

Recreation center in Manhattan, New York

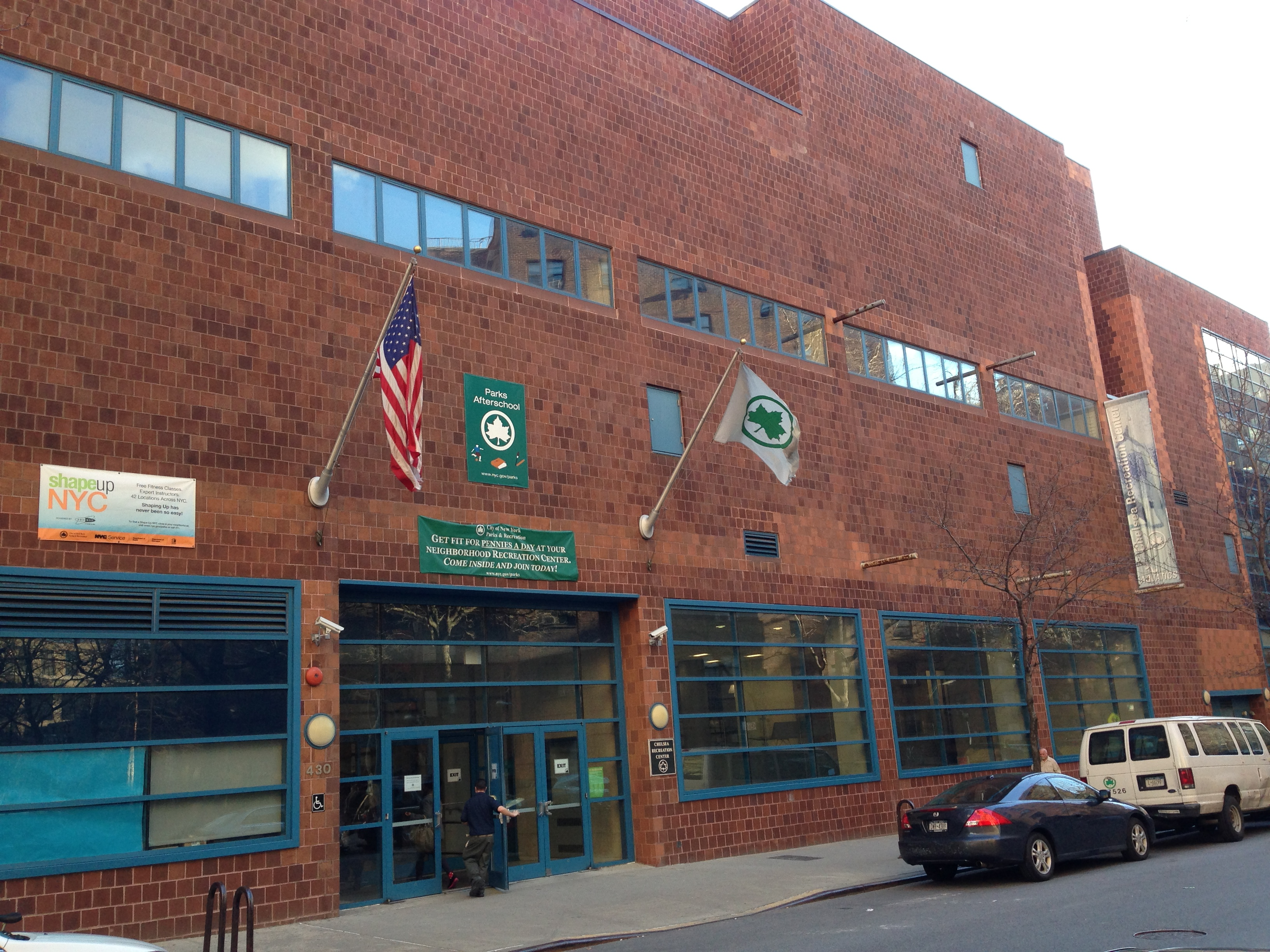
- Interactive map of the Chelsea Recreation Center area
- Alternative names: Chelsea Rec Center

General information
- Location: Chelsea, Manhattan, New York City, 430 West 25th Street
- Coordinates: 40.74838°N 74.0020°W
- Construction started: 1973
- Completed: May 11, 2004
- Cost: $22.4 million
- Owner: City of New York

Technical details
- Floor count: 6
- Floor area: 56,500 square feet (5,250 m^{2})

Design and construction
- Architecture firm: Koutsomitis Architects

The Chelsea Recreation Center is a community center and athletic facility operated by the New York City Department of Parks and Recreation in Chelsea, Manhattan. At 56,500 square feet (5,250 m^{2}), the building is one of the largest neighborhood recreation centers in New York City, containing a 25-yard six lane pool, volleyball court, basketball court, fitness rooms, dance studios, game rooms, and a computer resource center. The center hosts a wide range of community-oriented classes and events, many of which are free to youth and older adults.

== History ==
In 1964 the previous Chelsea Recreation Center, the former Chelsea Bathhouse at 407 West 28th Street, was demolished to make way for the construction of the Morgan Annex postal facility. Construction began on a replacement recreation center on June 3, 1974, but was abandoned on January 19, 1976, due to the New York City fiscal crisis of 1975. Windows were sealed over with concrete and steel girders left exposed, with an air conditioner unit remaining on the roof for when construction resumed. Completion of the facility was a consistent request at neighborhood meetings over the next 25 years, and neighborhood groups even hired a consultant and an architect to help make their case to the city.

When New York City experienced an economic upswing in the early 2000s financing was made available to complete the recreation center. On June 7, 2001, Mayor Rudolph Giuliani, state senator Thomas Duane, and city council members including Peter Vallone, Jr. and Christine Quinn swung gold sledgehammers against a brick wall to mark the resumption of construction. A five-panel mural consisting of 175,000 tiles based on dolphin photographs by Tsuneo Nakamura was installed next to the pool as a gift by the Italian Trade Commission and Bisazza Mosaico. The center was completed at a final cost of $22.4 million on May 11, 2004, and was inaugurated by Mayor Michael Bloomberg at a ribbon-cutting ceremony in the center's gymnasium.

== Membership ==
Membership is free for children under age 18. Adult membership currently costs $150 per year, though for young adults ages 18–24, the price was set at $25 per year. Members over age 62 also pay $25 per year. Improving public health is seen as a priority of the Michael Bloomberg administration, justifying city-run community recreation centers with fees below those of private health clubs.
