= Tiffany Cabán =

American public defender and politician

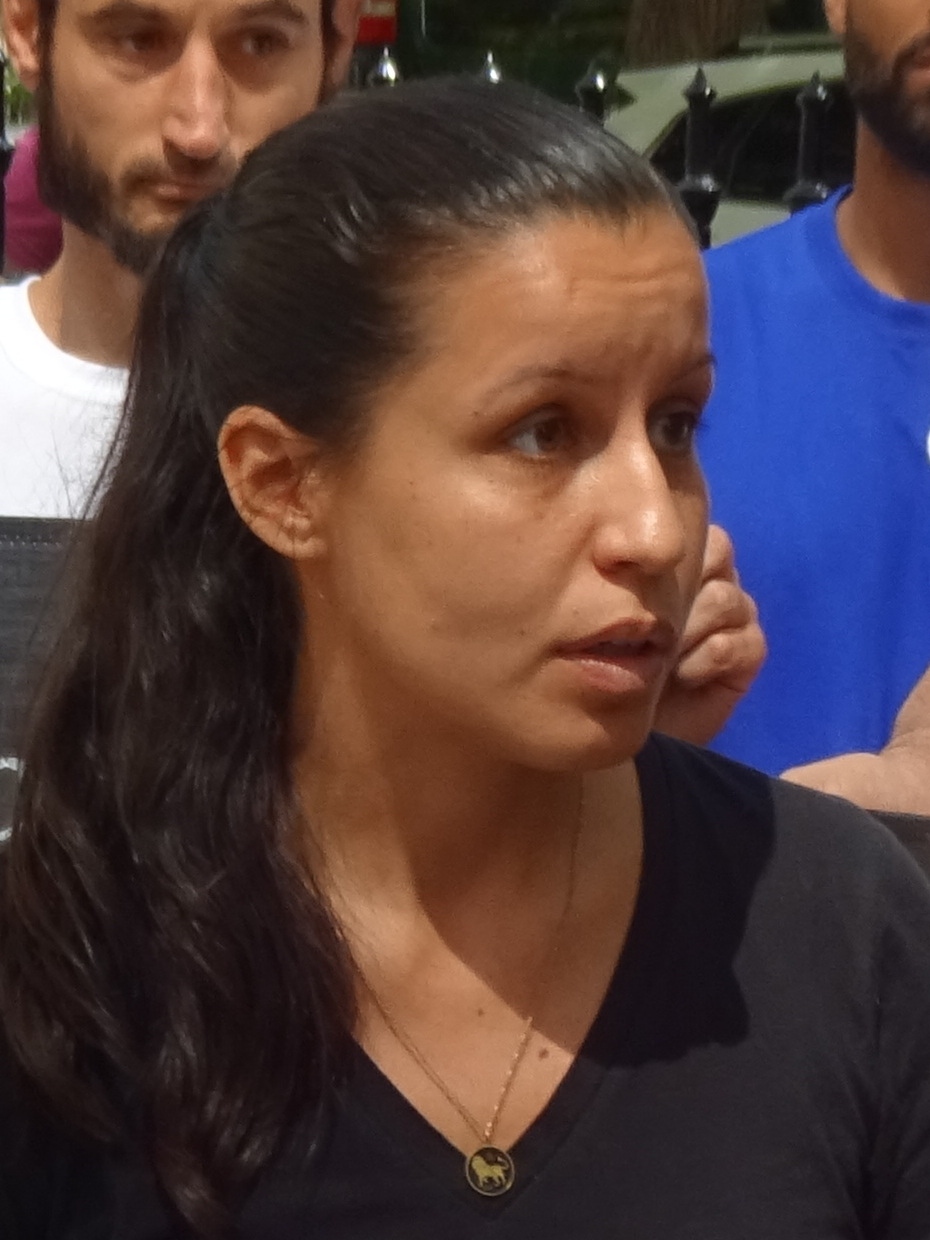
- Cabán in 2022

Member of the New York City Council from the 22nd district
- Incumbent
- Assumed office December 1, 2021
- Preceded by: Costa Constantinides
- Parliamentary group: New York City Socialists in Office

Personal details
- Born: July 24, 1987 (age 39) New York City, New York, U.S.
- Party: Democratic
- Other political affiliations: Democratic Socialists of America
- Education: Pennsylvania State University (BA); New York Law School (JD)
- Website: Official website

Tiffany Cabán (born July 24, 1987) is an American attorney, politician, and political organizer who has served as a member of the New York City Council for the 22nd District since the 2021 New York City Council election. She won the Democratic primary for the seat after the incumbent, Democrat Costa Constantinides, retired.

She was a candidate in the 2019 Democratic primary for Queens County's District Attorney in the State of New York, which she narrowly lost to Queens Borough president Melinda Katz. She is a member of the Democratic Socialists of America.

== Early life and education ==
Cabán was born in Richmond Hill, Queens, to Puerto Rican parents: a union elevator mechanic father and a children's pre-school purveyor mother; both had been raised in Woodside Houses (which had been built to house returning veterans), and they were neighbors of former school Chancellor Joel Klein. She attended PS 62 and JHS 210 before attending St. Francis Preparatory School, a private Catholic school in Fresh Meadows. She earned a Bachelor of Arts degree from Pennsylvania State University, where she majored in studies of crime, law, and justice. Subsequently, she earned a Juris Doctor degree from New York Law School.

== Career ==
Cabán was a public defender who worked for New York County Defender Services and the Legal Aid Society.

=== Queens District Attorney campaign ===
Cabán's 2019 campaign for Queens County District Attorney focused on criminal justice reform, including ending mass incarceration and the war on drugs. She also called for the decriminalization of sex work. Cabán was endorsed by The New York Times, as well as progressive politicians such as Alexandria Ocasio-Cortez, Bernie Sanders, Elizabeth Warren, and Larry Krasner, as well as several progressive members of the New York State Legislature and Suffolk County, Massachusetts DA Rachael Rollins. The race drew national attention, drawing comparisons to Ocasio-Cortez's upset victory in the 2018 House primary election over Joe Crowley.

Progressive political organizations also endorsed her campaign, including Citizen Action of New York, the Working Families Party, the Democratic Socialists of America, Make the Road, Real Justice, and other community organizations in New York.

Cabán faced Queens Borough President Melinda Katz in the Democratic primary. The previous District Attorney, Richard Brown, had intended to retire after the election, but died in office shortly before the primary. On June 25, 2019, Cabán claimed victory over Katz prematurely–telling supporters at her watch party: “We did it y’all.” But with the margin between them standing at just over one percentage point, and thousands of ballots yet to be counted, Katz declined to concede the election. On July 3, election officials said Katz pulled ahead in the count with a lead of 20 votes, automatically triggering the first manual recount in the borough in 64 years. On August 6, days after the Board of Elections certified the results of the weeks-long recount, with Katz leading Cabán by 60 votes and Katz being declared the ultimate victor, Cabán conceded the race.

=== Post-campaign work ===
After her campaign for District Attorney, Cabán worked as a national political organizer with the Working Families Party. She focused on recruiting decarceral criminal justice reformers to run for office.

=== New York City Council ===
In September 2020, Cabán announced her candidacy for the 22nd district of the New York City Council in the 2021 election. The incumbent Costa Constantinides could not seek re-election due to term limits. New York City's 22nd district covers Ditmars-Steinway, Queens, Astoria, Queens, and parts of East Elmhurst, Queens. She ran on a democratic socialist and police and prison abolitionist program on a Democratic Party ticket, with support from the Democratic Socialists of America, including the New York City chapter.

Cabán was sworn in on December 1, 2021 following her election on November 2, in order to fill the vacancy left by Constantinides' resignation.

In 2022, Cabán supported a proposed rezoning to allow a 1300-unit housing development (one quarter of which was earmarked for affordable housing) on a former industrial site in her district.

On May 2, 2023, Cabán joined protesters at a New York City Rent Guidelines Board meeting at the Great Hall of Cooper Union at Astor Place in Manhattan to protest the proposed 16 percent rent hike on rent-stabilized apartments with two year leases. They all called for a rent rollback for all tenants living in rent-controlled and stabilized units. Tiffany was joined by fellow council members Chi Osse, Alexa Aviles, Shahana Hanif, and Sandy Nurse.

On September 16, 2024, she became the first member of the New York City Council to publicly call for mayor Eric Adams to step down from office, due to ongoing criminal investigations into many of his close associates. On September 25, 2024, she reaffirmed that stance following his federal indictment.

In April 2026, Cabán introduced the Delivery Protection Act, which would require companies like Amazon to directly employ last-mile delivery drivers and warehouse workers, as well as set licensing, safety, and training requirements for last-mile facilities.

In September 2026, Cabán was arrested alongside over 100 protestors at a protest ahead of a speech by Israeli prime minister Benjamin Netanyahu at the United Nations General Assembly.

== Personal life ==
Cabán lives in Astoria, Queens, and is queer.

== See also ==
- LGBT culture in New York City
- List of LGBT people from New York City

== Electoral history ==
=== 2025 ===
2025 New York City Council election, District 22
Party	Candidate	Votes	%
Democratic	Tiffany Cabán	30,066	73.2
Working Families	Tiffany Cabán	9,946	24.2
Total	Tiffany Cabán (incumbent)	40,012	97.4
Write-in		1,062	2.6
Total votes		41,074	100.0
Democratic hold			

=== 2023 ===
2023 New York City Council Democratic primary, District 22
Party	Candidate	Votes	%
Democratic	Tiffany Cabán (incumbent)	5,303	84.8
Democratic	Charles A. Castro	869	13.9
Write-in		83	1.3
Total votes		6,255	100.0

2023 New York City Council election, District 22
Party	Candidate	Votes	%
Democratic	Tiffany Cabán	7,294	51.9
Working Families	Tiffany Cabán	2,445	17.4
Total	Tiffany Cabán (incumbent)	9,739	69.3
Republican	Kelly M. Klingman	3,789	27.0
Conservative	Kelly M. Klingman (Note: Shared with "Animal Welfare" ballot line.)	415	3.0
Total	Kelly M. Klingman	4,204	29.9
Write-in		113	0.8
Total votes		14,056	100.0
Democratic hold			

=== 2021 ===
2021 New York City Council Democratic primary, District 22
Party	Candidate	Maximum round	Maximum votes	Share in maximum round	Maximum votes First round votes Transfer votes
Democratic	Tiffany Cabán	3	9,088	62.6%	
Democratic	Evie Hantzopoulos	3	5,424	37.4%	
Democratic	John J. Ciafone	2	1,622	10.0%	
Democratic	Leonardo T. Bullaro	2	1,221	7.5%	
Democratic	Catherina Gioino	2	804	5.0%	
Democratic	Nick Velkov	2	463	2.9%	
Write-In		1	30	0.2%	

2021 New York City Council election, District 22
Party	Candidate	Votes	%
Democratic	Tiffany Cabán	12,885	63.4
Republican	Felicia R. Kalan	5,563	27.4
Conservative	Felicia R. Kalan (Note: Shared with "Save Our City" ballot line.)	646	3.2
Total	Felicia R. Kalan	6,209	30.6
Green	Edwin DeJesus	1,172	5.8
Write-in		53	0.3
Total votes		20,319	100.0
Democratic hold			

=== 2019 ===
2019 Queens County District Attorney Democratic primary
Party	Candidate	Votes	%
Democratic	Melinda Katz	34,920	38.7
Democratic	Tiffany Cabán	34,860	38.7
Democratic	Gregory L. Lasak	13,048	14.5
Democratic	Mina Quinto Malik	3,526	3.9
Democratic	Rory I. Lancman	1,415	1.6
Democratic	Jose L. Nieves	1,210	1.3
Democratic	Betty Lugo	1,095	1.2
Write-in		68	0.1
Total votes		90,142	100.0
