= Melinda Katz =

American attorney and politician (born 1965)

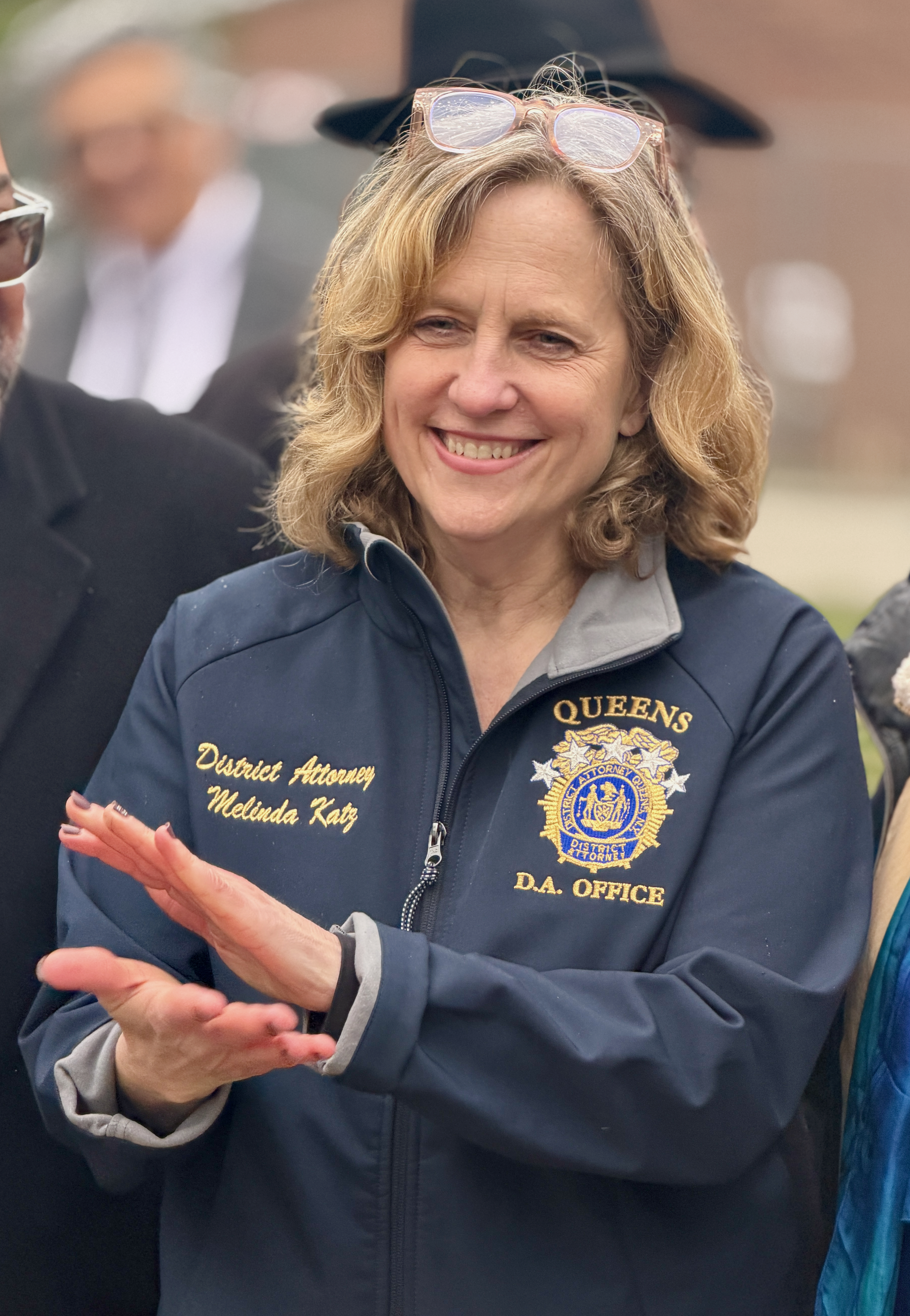
- Katz in 2025

District Attorney of Queens County
- Incumbent
- Assumed office January 1, 2020
- Chief Assistant: Shawn Clark (2026-present)
- Preceded by: John M. Ryan (acting)

19th Borough President of Queens
- In office January 1, 2014 – December 31, 2019
- Preceded by: Helen M. Marshall
- Succeeded by: Sharon Lee

Member of the New York City Council from the 29th district
- In office January 1, 2002 – December 31, 2009
- Preceded by: Karen Koslowitz
- Succeeded by: Karen Koslowitz

Member of the New York State Assembly from the 28th district
- In office 1994 – January 6, 1999
- Preceded by: Alan Hevesi
- Succeeded by: Michael Cohen

Personal details
- Born: August 29, 1965 (age 61) New York City, U.S.
- Party: Democratic
- Domestic partner: Curtis Sliwa (sep. 2014)
- Children: 2
- Relatives: David Katz (father)
- Education: University of Massachusetts, Amherst (BA); St. John's University, New York (JD)
- Website: Office website Campaign website

Melinda R. Katz (born August 19,1965) is an American attorney and politician from New York City, serving as the district attorney of Queens since January 1, 2020.

As a Democrat, she previously served as the Queens Borough President from 2014 to 2019. Katz was also a New York City Councilwoman from 2002 to 2009. She ran for New York City comptroller in 2009. In 2019, Katz won the Democratic nomination for Queens County's District Attorney, and she won the general election in November 2019.

== Early life and education ==
Melinda Katz was born on August 19, 1965, and grew up in Forest Hills, Queens, with three older brothers. She is Jewish and comes from a Jewish family with a long history of civic involvement. Her mother, Jeanne Dale Katz, founded the Queens Council on the Arts one year after Melinda was born. When Melinda was three years old, her mother was killed in a car accident after being struck by a drunk driver. Her father then raised her and her brothers. Her father, conductor David Katz, founded the Queens Symphony Orchestra and a music camp. Melinda sang with the orchestra as a mezzo-soprano. Her father died in 1987, when Melinda was 21 years old.

Katz attended Hillcrest High School in Queens. She earned a B.A. degree in 1987 from the University of Massachusetts Amherst, summa cum laude with honors, where she was named a Commonwealth Scholar. She wrote her college honors thesis on how gay men in the fashion industry had a difficult time receiving loans because bankers were afraid that AIDS would kill the men before the loans could be repaid. She earned a J.D. degree in 1990 from St. John's University School of Law, where she wrote for the Law Journal.

== Career ==
=== Early years ===
After law school, she worked as a law clerk for Michael Mukasey, who was serving as judge for the United States District Court for the Southern District of New York. She later interned with the United States Attorney for the Southern District of New York and was an adjunct professor of constitutional law at Queens College.

She was recruited by the law firm Weil, Gotshal & Manges, where she worked as an associate on mergers and acquisitions for over four years before running for the New York State Assembly.

=== New York State Assembly (1994–99) ===
Running on the Liberal and Good Government party lines, and with the endorsement of The New York Times, Katz won election to the New York State Assembly in 1994, defeating local Democratic district leader and Queens Democratic Party candidate Michael Cohen by eight percentage points. In 1995, the New York Daily News named her "one of the one hundred up-and-coming young leaders for the 21st Century."

She served as a Member of the New York State Assembly from 1994 to 1999, representing Queens' 28th District. During her tenure as an assembly member, Katz drafted 16 bills that became laws, including health care initiatives. She wrote the law requiring HMOs to provide women direct access to gynecological care, without forcing the women to first see a primary care physician. She was also the Chair of the subcommittee on Urban Health. She was the primary sponsor of several bills to increase penalties for various forms of assault, including a bill to extend the statute of limitations for child sexual abuse, which was opposed by the Roman Catholic Church. In 1998, she relinquished her seat to run for the U.S. Congress.

=== 1998 Congressional Democratic primary ===
In 1998, Katz ran for U.S. Congress from New York's 9th congressional district. The seat had been held by Chuck Schumer, who was running for the U.S. Senate. She was endorsed by The New York Times, which praised her as "an advocate of health and women's issues and for her constituent services". She lost the primary by 285 votes to Anthony Weiner, who went on to win the subsequent general election.

From 1999 to 2002, she was Director of Community Boards for the Office of the Queens Borough President.

=== New York City Council (2002–09) ===
Katz was subsequently elected to the New York City Council, where she served from 2002 to 2009. She represented the 29th district.

Katz served as Chair of the Standing Committee on Land Use, which was responsible for approving major projects and rezoning measures for wide-ranging pockets of the city, including Williamsburg, Greenpoint, and Jamaica. As Chair of the committee, Katz oversaw the rezoning of 6,000 city blocks, including the Greenpoint-Williamsburg rezoning in 2005, the rezoning of 125th Street in Harlem, and the redevelopment of Willets Point.

In 2003 she introduced legislation to make it easier for New Yorkers to have pets, including protecting the elderly from being evicted from an apartment building due to their having a pet. In 2005, she wrote to the president of New York City Transit, urging the installation of a camera surveillance system in Queens subway stations to deter crime.

=== Private sector ===
Katz reached her Council term limit in 2009. She worked as a shareholder at the Greenberg Traurig law firm, where she specialized in government affairs and land use until her 2013 election as the Borough President of Queens. As Borough President, she lobbied for News Corporation.

=== 2009 New York City Comptroller Democratic primary ===
In 2009, Katz ran for New York City Comptroller in a four-person Democratic primary. She sought to diversify pension funds, expand bank access to residents in poor neighborhoods, require greater transparency in the New York City Department of Education, and explored investing pension fund money in distressed debt. She was the only female who was running for any citywide political office that year. She finished third with 20% of the vote, behind winner Councilman John Liu and runner-up Councilman David Yassky.

=== Queens Borough President (2014–20) ===
In 2012, Katz announced her plans to run for Queens Borough President in 2013. Her priorities were reported by The New York Times as including "an economic master plan for development in the borough ... [and] a better plan for Flushing Meadows-Corona Park, where a soccer stadium is being considered." She was endorsed by The New York Times, Congresswoman Grace Meng, Councilman Leroy Comrie, Pastor and former Congressman Floyd Flake, and the 1199 Hospital Workers Union. She won the Democratic nomination, defeating former New York City Councilman Peter Vallone Jr. by 11 percentage points. She went on to win the general election with 80% of the vote.

In 2014, she broke with her predecessor's position and said that the New York State Pavilion in Flushing Meadows-Corona Park, Queens, which had been created for the 1964 New York World's Fair should be restored "for future generations to enjoy," rather than being demolished, calling it an “architectural marvel.” In March 2017, she said that two significant challenges facing the borough were overcrowded schools, at 115% of capacity, and the borough's need for more housing.

She was re-elected in 2017 with 78% of the vote in the general election. In 2017, she sent three letters to Carmen Fariña, the New York City Schools Chancellor, requesting that the process for hiring high school principals be changed. She said that the current process was “entirely shrouded under a veil of silence and secrecy.”

=== Queens District Attorney (2020–present) ===
In December 2018, Katz announced her candidacy for Queens District Attorney. Her platform included working to reduce the impact of the Iron Pipeline, fighting for worker protections, targeting hate crimes and housing fraud, opposing ICE agents inside the courthouse, not prosecuting low-level marijuana offenses, not prosecuting sex workers but targeting traffickers, pimps, and people who solicit sex workers, and working to prevent elder abuse. She was endorsed by New York Governor Andrew Cuomo and by U.S. Representatives Gregory Meeks and Carolyn Maloney, Speaker of the New York State Assembly Carl Heastie, and Bronx Borough President Rubén Díaz Jr.

In the Democratic primary, Katz faced five opponents including Tiffany Cabán, a democratic socialist public defender who was endorsed by several progressive politicians, including Alexandria Ocasio-Cortez and Bernie Sanders. The initial Democratic primary results on June 25, 2019 showed Cabán with a narrow 1.3% lead over Katz. Cabán declared victory prematurely–telling supporters at her watch party: “We did it y’all.” Katz performed particularly well in Assembly Districts 23–29, which comprise much of Southeast Queens. On July 3, 2019, election officials said that Katz had pulled ahead in the final count and led Cabán by a mere 20 votes, automatically triggering the first manual recount in the borough in 64 years. On July 29, 2019, the Board of Elections certified the results of the weeks-long recount, resulting in Katz leading Cabán by 60 votes out of more than 90,000, and declaring victory. Cabán said she would challenge the invalidation of over 100 ballots in court. On August 6, 2019, Cabán conceded the race. In November 2019, Katz won the general election, beating Republican defense attorney and former NYPD officer Joe Murray with 75% of the vote.

Katz was sworn in as the District Attorney of Queens on January 6, 2020. She became the first woman to serve as head prosecutor in Queens.

As D.A., in 2020 she created a review unit named the Conviction Integrity Unit to consider potential wrongful convictions in Queens, supported a number of exonerations, and reduced her office's prosecution of a number of low-level, nonviolent crimes, such as low-level arrests for marijuana. In November 2021, she asked a judge to throw out 60 criminal cases that had relied on the testimony in Queens prosecutions of three former New York Police Department (NYPD) detectives who were later convicted of perjury, sexual assault, or official misconduct. She said: "We cannot stand behind a criminal conviction where the essential law enforcement witness has been convicted of crimes which irreparably impair their credibility." By November 2022 the new unit had vacated 13 convictions, by August 2023 it had vacated 102 convictions, and by August 2024, it had asked courts to throw out 148 convictions.

Endorsed by U.S. Representatives Gregory Meeks and Grace Meng, New York City Mayor Eric Adams, and New York State Governor Kathy Hochul, Katz successfully ran for re-election in 2023, defeating former administrative judge and former NYPD first deputy commissioner George Grasso in the Democratic primary with 71% of the vote. She won the general election with 67% of the vote, defeating both Republican nominee Michael Mossa, and George Grasso, who ran as an independent. In 2024, her office and the NYPD’s Cold Case Squad used publicly available genealogy databases to identify and arrest a suspect for a killing that took place in Queens 16 years prior, the first time that approach had been used in New York City, she said.

In March 2026, City & State named her to its "The 2026 Queens Power 100" list, as one of the most powerful individuals in the borough.

== Personal life ==
Katz is a mezzo-soprano, and has sung with the Queens Symphony Orchestra.

Katz was in a relationship with Curtis Sliwa, the founder of the Guardian Angels, and separated from him in 2014. They have two children together, conceived through in vitro fertilization. The children were conceived from sperm donated by Sliwa, during a time when he and Katz were not dating. In 2012, Sliwa's ex-wife Mary sued Katz and Sliwa, accusing Sliwa of diverting money to Katz while he was still married to Mary, as part of a plan to build a "nest egg" for Katz and their children prior to moving in with her. The lawsuit was dismissed. Sliwa was later the 2021 and 2025 Republican nominee for New York City mayor. Katz now lives with their two sons in her Forest Hills childhood home.

== Writings ==
- Katz, Melinda (April 5, 2022). "Keeping up the pressure on human trafficking". The Daily News.
- Katz, Melinda (June 30, 2022). "Drive in New York without a license, pay a price". The Daily News. Archived from the original on September 15, 2025.
- Melinda Katz, "Tougher penalties needed for attacks against straphangers," The Daily News, January 29, 2023.
- Katz, Melinda (December 24, 2023). "Responding to monstrous acts: Where is the outrage to mass rapes?". The Daily News. Archived from the original on December 24, 2023.

New York State Assembly
Preceded by Alan Hevesi	Member of the New York Assembly from the 28th district 1994–99	Succeeded by Michael Cohen
Political offices
Preceded by Karen Koslowitz	Member of the New York City Council from the 29th district 2002–09	Succeeded by Karen Koslowitz
Preceded by Helen M. Marshall	Borough President of Queens; 2014–20	Succeeded by Sharon Lee; Acting
Legal offices
Preceded by John M. Ryan	District Attorney of Queens County; 2020–present	Incumbent
