= Andrew Hevesi =

American politician (born 1973)

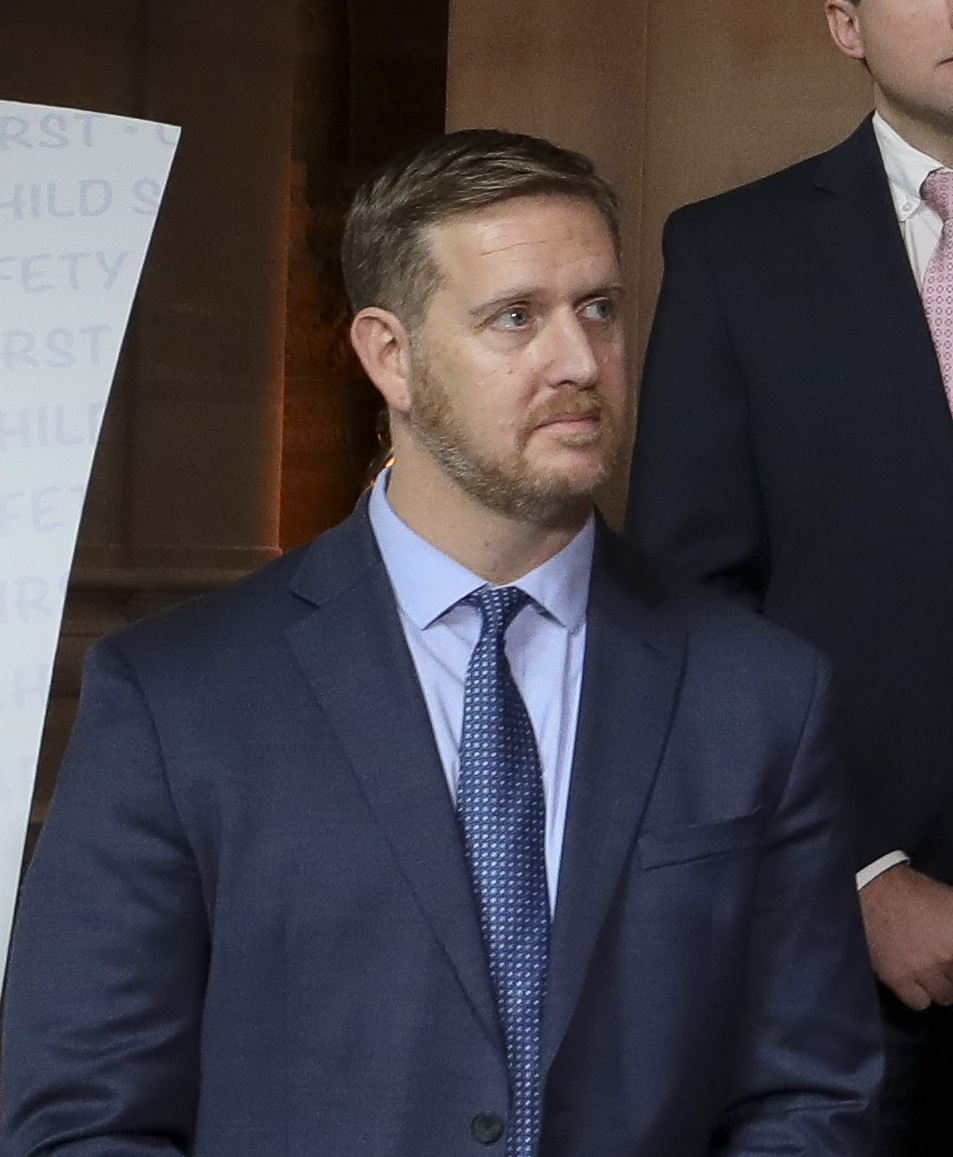
- Hevesi in 2023

Member of the New York State Assembly from the 28th district
- Incumbent
- Assumed office May 11, 2005
- Preceded by: Michael L. Cohen

Personal details
- Born: November 19, 1973 (age 53) Forest Hills, New York, U.S.
- Party: Democratic
- Spouse: Rachel
- Relatives: Alan Hevesi (father)
- Education: Queens College (BA)
- Website: State Assembly website

Andrew D. Hevesi (born November 19, 1973) is a Democratic member of the New York State Assembly representing the 28th Assembly District, which includes Forest Hills, Rego Park, Richmond Hill, Glendale, Kew Gardens, Ridgewood, and Middle Village.

== Early life and family ==
Hevesi is the son of former New York State Comptroller Alan Hevesi, and the brother of former New York State Senator Daniel Hevesi.

Andrew Hevesi held several public service positions before being elected to the New York State Assembly, including a period in both the Queens District Attorney's office and as Director of Community Affairs for Public Advocate Betsy Gotbaum. Hevesi also served as Chief of Staff for former New York State Senator Jeff Klein.

Hevesi has a BA degree in political science from Queens College. He married Rachel Ross in 2007. The couple has a daughter.

== Political career ==
On May 10, 2005, Hevesi won a special election to fill a seat left vacant by the resignation of former Assemblyman Michael Cohen, serving for the remainder of his term. He was re-elected in November 2006 and has been re-elected in every election since.

From June 2011 to February 2015, Hevesi served as Chair of the Assembly Committee on Oversight, Analysis and Investigation. As chair, he held hearings on issues including health care, human trafficking, and technology infrastructure in New York State.

In February 2015, Hevesi was appointed Chair of the Assembly Committee on Social Services.

Since 2021, Hevesi has served as Chair of the Assembly Committee on Children and Families. During his tenure, the committee has focused on child welfare policy, foster care, child protective services, juvenile justice, and access to child care. Legislation he sponsored was enacted raising the minimum age for juvenile delinquency proceedings from seven to twelve years old, except in homicide cases, and replacing anonymous reports to the State Central Register of Child Abuse and Maltreatment with a confidential reporting system.

In 2026, the Legislature passed Kyra's Law (A.6194-C), sponsored by Hevesi, requiring courts to consider allegations and histories of domestic violence, child abuse, stalking, coercive control, and other risk factors when making child custody and visitation determinations. During the same legislative session, the Legislature also passed legislation sponsored by Hevesi establishing a statewide supervised visitation initiative through the Office of Children and Family Services.

Hevesi has supported expansions to the Empire State Child Tax Credit and increased state investment in child care affordability, child care workforce support, and family assistance programs.

== Election results ==
- June 2026 Democratic primary election, NYS Assembly, 28th AD

Candidate	%	Votes
Andrew D. Hevesi	87.7	6,749
Jonathan Rinaldi	11.8	906
Write-in	0.5	40

- November 2024 general election, NYS Assembly, 28th AD

Candidate	%	Votes
Andrew D. Hevesi (DEM – WOR)	58.6	28,376
Jonathan Rinaldi (REP)	41.1	19,900
Write-in	0.2	117

- November 2022 general election, NYS Assembly, 28th AD

Candidate	%	Votes
Andrew D. Hevesi (DEM – WOR)	58.3	20,550
Michael Conigliaro (REP – CON)	41.7	14,704

- June 2022 Democratic primary election, NYS Assembly, 28th AD

Candidate	%	Votes
Andrew D. Hevesi	69.1	5,305
Ethan Felder	30.9	2,368

- November 2020 general election, NYS Assembly, 28th AD

Candidate	%	Votes
Andrew D. Hevesi (DEM)	86.5	34,634
Danniel Maio (COVID-19 Stories Party)	13.5	5,384

- June 2020 Democratic primary election, NYS Assembly, 28th AD

Candidate	%	Votes
Andrew D. Hevesi	—	9,763

- November 2018 general election, NYS Assembly, 28th AD

Candidate	%	Votes
Andrew D. Hevesi (DEM)	73.2	23,702
Danniel Maio (REP)	26.8	8,688

- September 2018 Democratic primary election, NYS Assembly, 28th AD

Candidate	%	Votes
Andrew D. Hevesi	Unopposed	—

- November 2016 general election, NYS Assembly, 28th AD

Candidate	%	Votes
Andrew D. Hevesi (DEM – WOR)	—	33,031

- September 2016 Democratic primary election, NYS Assembly, 28th AD

Candidate	%	Votes
Andrew D. Hevesi	Unopposed	—

- November 2014 general election, NYS Assembly, 28th AD

Candidate	%	Votes
Andrew D. Hevesi (DEM – WOR)	—	15,905

- September 2014 Democratic primary election, NYS Assembly, 28th AD

Candidate	%	Votes
Andrew D. Hevesi	Unopposed	—

- November 2012 general election, NYS Assembly, 28th AD

Candidate	%	Votes
Andrew D. Hevesi (DEM – WOR)	—	26,808

- September 2012 Democratic primary election, NYS Assembly, 28th AD

Candidate	%	Votes
Andrew D. Hevesi	Unopposed	—

- November 2010 general election, NYS Assembly, 28th AD

Candidate	%	Votes
Andrew D. Hevesi (DEM – WOR)	62.3	14,237
Aleksander P. Powietrzynski (REP – CON)	33.2	7,578
Joseph E. Tiraco (IND)	4.5	1,017

- September 2010 Democratic primary election, NYS Assembly, 28th AD

Candidate	%	Votes
Andrew D. Hevesi	60.3	2,984
Joe Fox	39.7	1,961

- November 2008 general election, NYS Assembly, 28th AD

Candidate	%	Votes
Andrew D. Hevesi (DEM – WOR)	73.1	24,255
Walter E. Schmidt (REP)	26.9	8,948

- November 2006 general election, NYS Assembly, 28th AD

Candidate	%	Votes
Andrew D. Hevesi (DEM – WOR)	72.4	14,790
Dolores Maddis (REP – CON)	27.6	5,653

- May 2005 special election, NYS Assembly, 28th AD

Candidate	%	Votes
Andrew D. Hevesi (DEM – WOR)	59.8	4,188
Anthony Como (REP – IND – CON)	40.2	2,817
