= David Katz (conductor) =

American conductor (1924–1987)

- Born: June 28, 1924; Mishawaka, Indiana, U.S.
- Died: May 20, 1987 (aged 62); Queens, New York, U.S.
- Education: Juilliard School (MA)
- Occupation: Conductor
- Children: 4, including Melinda

David Katz (June 28, 1924 – May 20, 1987) was an American conductor who founded the Queens Symphony Orchestra (QSO) in 1953, and served as its conductor until his death.

== Early life and education ==
Katz was born in Mishawaka, Indiana. He graduated from the Juilliard School of Music and moved to Forest Hills, Queens with his wife, Jeanne.

== Career ==
During the 1970s, the Queens Symphony Orchestra joined the union and became the first and only professional orchestra in Queens. At this time, QSO was affiliated with the American Symphony Orchestra League and Forest Hills Community Center. David Katz was discovered by Leopold Stokowski, who he joined as associate conductor of the American Symphony Orchestra (ASO). Katz conducted the ASO at Carnegie Hall from 1961 till 1970. He also conducted the Oratorio Society of Queens from 1968 to 1969, succeeding Lawrence Rasmussen. and later conducted the Tokyo Symphony Orchestra in 1971.

By QSO's second season, children's concerts were added to the schedule, leading to David and Jeannie starting the Music BAG Program (Music for Boys and Girls). This program was designed to get kids involved with making music with the orchestra, and learning the history and theory of music. By the 1970s, the BAG Program was reaching over 17,000 school children annually throughout Queens supported by Macy's and the Long Island Press.

In 1969, Katz and his wife Jeanne Dale Katz founded Long Lake Camp for the Arts a summer camp in Long Lake, New York. Future Oscar-winning actor Adrien Brody attended the camp. His son, Marc Katz, and Susan Katz later took over the camp.

Katz continued to conduct until the month before his death.

== Personal life and death ==
David and Jeanne had four children: Mathew, Michael, Marc, and Melinda. Jeannie Katz also founded the Queens Council on the Arts in 1966, which helps promote and develop the arts in the county of Queens, New York. His wife was killed in a car accident–struck and killed by a drunk driver, and he raised the four children.

In recognition of his work with the orchestra, David Katz received the Mayor's Award of Honor for Arts and Culture from Mayor Ed Koch in 1982.

Katz died from cancer at his home in Forest Hills on May 20, 1987, aged 62.

His daughter Melinda Katz is Queens County District Attorney, and has been the 19th Borough President of Queens, a Member of the New York City Council, and a Member of the New York State Assembly.
