= John M. Ryan =

American prosecutor (born 1949)

Jack Ryan

District Attorney of Queens County
- Acting; May 4, 2019 – December 31, 2019
- Chief Assistant: Vacant (2019)
- Preceded by: Richard A. Brown
- Succeeded by: Melinda Katz

Chief Assistant District Attorney of Queens County
- In office 1997 – May 4, 2019
- District Attorney: Richard A. Brown
- Succeeded by: Jennifer L. Naiburg (2020)

Personal details
- Born: John Michael Ryan; 1949 (age 76–77) Brooklyn, New York, U.S.
- Party: Independent
- Spouse: Barbara (m. 1970)
- Education: St. John's University (BA, JD)
- Occupation: Lawyer

John Michael Ryan (born 1949) is an American lawyer from New York who served as the acting district attorney of Queens County in 2019. Born in Brooklyn and raised on Long Island, he attended St. John's University and its law school. Joining the Queens District Attorney's office as an intern in 1972, he worked there before joining the state attorney general's office, where he led the investigation of the Tawana Brawley rape allegations. Shortly after the appointment of Richard Brown in 1991, he returned to Queens, serving in the district attorney's office for the next 28 years.

In May 2019, Brown, who had earlier announced his planned resignation for health reasons, died, and Ryan, then chief assistant district attorney, was sworn in in an acting capacity. He remained in that position until the beginning of the following year, when Melinda Katz assumed office, after which he retired.

== Early life and family ==
=== Childhood and education ===
Ryan was born in 1949 in Brooklyn to Florence (née Rafferty; 1908–1988) and John Patrick Ryan (1902–1958). He grew up on Long Island and attended Archbishop Molloy High School in Queens. He then entered St. John's University, from which he graduated with a degree in political science in 1970. He graduated from St. John's University School of Law in 1974.

=== Personal life ===
Ryan married his wife, Barbara, in 1970. They have three children: two daughters and a son. He is an avid New York Mets fan.

== Legal career ==
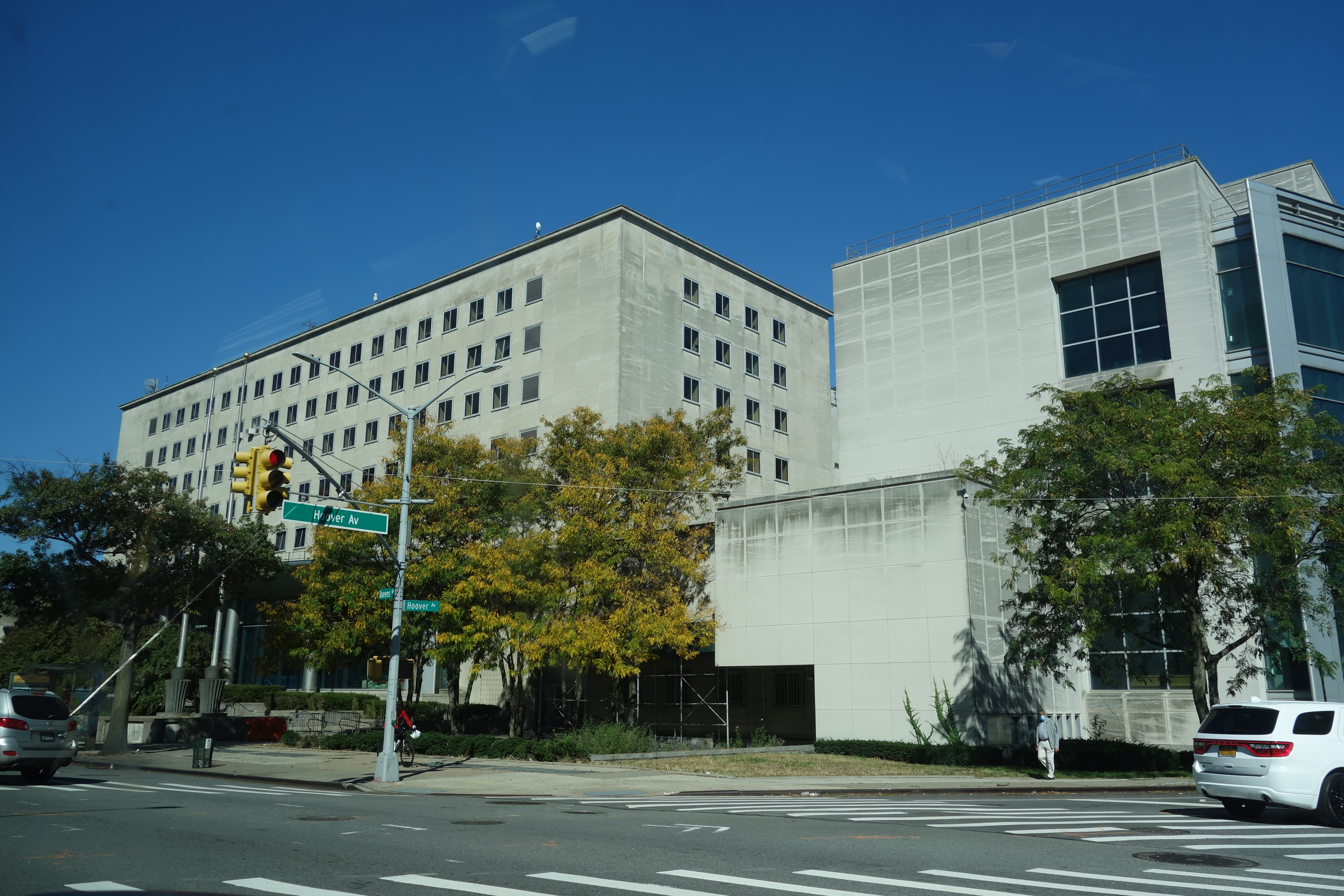
The Queens County Courts Building in Kew Gardens, where the Queens District Attorney's Office is located

Ryan began his career as an intern in the Queens District Attorney's office in June 1972. On his graduation from law school, he was hired as a criminal investigator and then as an assistant district attorney when he was admitted to the bar in February 1975. He was the prosecutor in charge of investigating the 1975 LaGuardia Airport bombing and, in 1977, participated in the arraignment of serial killer David Berkowitz. In 1978, he investigated and assisted in the prosecution of FALN member William Morales on weapons charges. In 1979, shortly after being promoted to deputy chief of the Homicide Investigations Bureau, he resigned to serve as an assistant state attorney general under Robert Abrams.

While with the attorney general's office, Ryan worked as chief of the Tax Division of the Special Prosecutions Bureau, deputy chief of the Criminal Prosecutions Bureau, and then as Assistant Attorney General-In-Charge of the Criminal Prosecutions Bureau. He had various special assignments including serving as a Special Assistant United States Attorney in both the Southern and Eastern Districts of New York. In 1988, after Abrams was appointed special prosecutor in the Tawana Brawley case by Mario Cuomo, Ryan was designated to lead the grand jury investigation. In this capacity, he frequently drew the ire of Al Sharpton, who likened him to a storm trooper and falsely accused him of kicking a blind man in a scuffle with demonstrators.

After Richard Brown was appointed to head the Queens District Attorney's Office in 1991, following John J. Santucci's resignation, Ryan returned to work there. Ryan was appointed chief assistant district attorney in 1997, second-in-command to Brown, a position he would stay in for 22 years.

On March 7, 2019, Brown announced he would step down for health reasons on June 1 and designated Ryan as his successor. Ryan took office early when Brown died in May. A political independent, Ryan defended his office amid criticism raised during that year's district attorney election campaign from criminal justice reform advocates. He clashed with the eventual election winner, borough president Melinda Katz, on her decision to eliminate cash bail, joining with Staten Island District Attorney Michael McMahon to criticize the move. He retired after Katz took office at the beginning of 2020.

Legal offices
Preceded by Richard Brown	Queens County District Attorney; 2019	Succeeded by Melinda Katz
