= Oratorio Society of Queens =

The Oratorio Society Of Queens
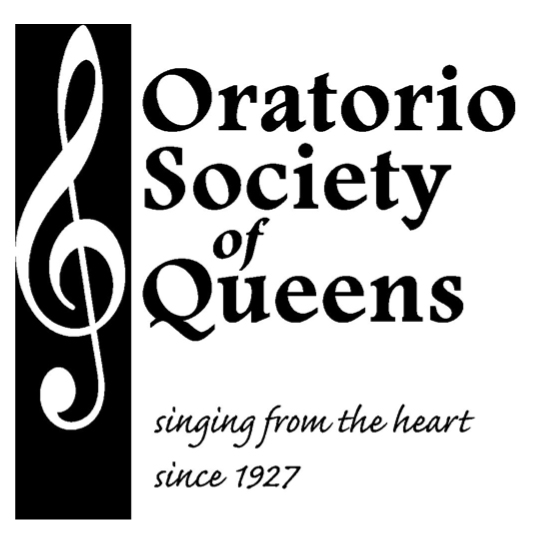

Background information
- Origin: Flushing, Queens, New York, United States
- Genres: Choral
- Occupation: Community Chorus
- Years active: 1927-present
- Members: Artistic Director & Conductor; Dr. Jin Byun; Assistant Conductor; Bridget Kinneary; Assistant to the Conductor; Barbara Podgurski
- Website: www.QueensOratorio.org

The Oratorio Society of Queens is a non-profit membership organization which performs the choral pieces and is the oldest performing arts institution in the borough of Queens, New York City. Dr. Jin H. Byun is the Artistic Director and Conductor.

Established in 1927 by Flushing residents, the Oratorio Society of Flushing competed with the prestigious Oratorio Society of New York, founded 54 years earlier. In 1985 the Society incorporated as the Oratorio Society of Queens (OSQ), covering members throughout the borough. Today the membership is borough-wide and even includes several Bronx and Nassau County residents.

OSQ is a charter member of both the Queens Council on the Arts and the Flushing Council on Culture & the Arts. Throughout its history, OSQ has been non-sectarian, and membership is open to anyone.

== History ==
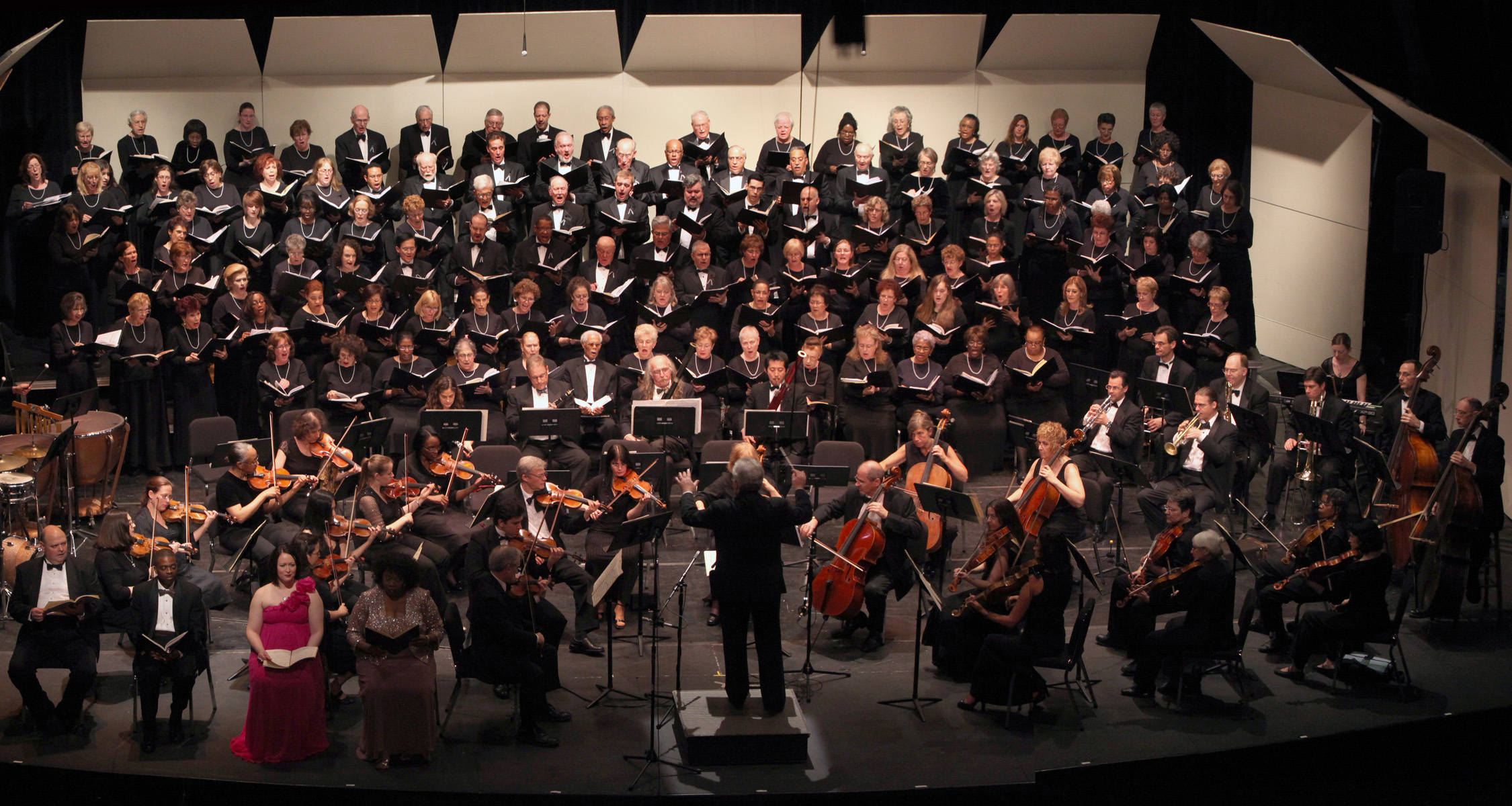
OSQ in concert

The Oratorio Society of Queens, originally known as the Oratorio Society of Flushing, was founded in 1927. The idea of a community-based mixed voice chorus, dedicated to sharing the aesthetic values oratorio music expresses, was conceived by Mrs. Edward Keefe. She was initially assisted by John W. Norton, organist and choirmaster of St. George's Episcopal Church; and Edward M. Franklin, a leading layman of the church.

Among the charter members was Bertha Parsons, the last owner-resident of John Bowne House before it was opened as a museum of early Flushing. On May 12, 1927 a chorus of 100 voices directed by John Norton performed Felix Mendelssohn's "Hymn of Praise" to critical acclaim before an audience of 900 at Flushing High School.

There would be carol singing at Flushing Hospital, after which the singers would sing at a founder's home. Maude Wilson was made an honorary member in the early 1930s because she contributed the entire proceeds of her Annual Party and Dahlia Flower Show to the Society.

The chorus, subsequently conducted by Herbert Stavely Sammond, and later by Lawrence Rasmussen, performed two major concerts a year until 1943, when Rasmussen was called to service in World War II. Rehearsals were suspended until 1946 when Rasmussen returned. David Katz, founder of the Queens Symphony, succeeded Mr. Rasmussen in ensuing years

In 1985, the Society changed its name to the Oratorio Society of Queens in recognition of membership deriving from all parts of Queens.

The Society is a "Cultural Partner" with The Queensborough Performing Arts Center at Queensborough Community College. The Society performs its annual Holiday concert at QPAC, and its Spring concert.

The Society has also performed at St. Andrew Avellino Church, the Reformed Temple of Forest Hills, Trinity Lutheran Church, Christ the King High School, Flushing Meadows-Corona Park under the Unisphere, Seuffert Bandshell in Forest Park, Bayside High School, and Colden Center.

The Society appeared at the 1939 New York World's Fair and in later years at Lincoln Center.

In July 2023, after 53 years of service, Close stepped down as Artistic Director and Conductor of the Oratorio Society of Queens. He was replaced by Jin H. Byun.

=== Notable members ===
- Margaret Harshaw, contralto, became a Metropolitan Opera singer.
- John Easterlin, tenor, has become a world-renown singer recently singing at The Lyric Opera in Chicago.
- Cornelius L. Reid, baritone, became a leading voice teacher in New York City with a number of books published to his credit.
- Maestro David Katz founded the Queens Symphony Orchestra.

== Awards and honors ==
- Charter Member of the Queens Council on the Arts 1967
- Certificate of Appreciation from the Queens Borough Public Library to David Close & the Flushing Oratorio Society (sic) for a presentation at a Holiday Program at the Hillcrest Branch, April 4, 1985
- Certificate of Appreciation from the Flushing Council on Culture and the Arts to the Oratorio Society of Flushing - its 1983 Award for Achievement, 12/8/82
- Congressional Record - Hon. Gary L. Ackerman 1987: "In these times when materialism seems to take precedence over many of the esthetic aspects of society, it is most important that the arts and the needs of the human spirit are not neglected. Through the fine efforts of the Oratorio Society of Queens, we may be sure that it will not be."
- Congressional Record - Hon. Gary L. Ackerman 2002
- Letters from Debra Markell-Kleinert, Queens Borough Director, Community Assistance Unit and from Michael Bloomberg, Mayor of the City of New York "welcoming everyone to Queensborough Community College for the 75th Holiday Concert of the Oratorio Society of Queens, 12/22/02"

== Conductors ==
- Spring 1927 - John Norton
- Winter 1927 - Dr. Clarence Dickinson
- Spring 1928–Spring 1938 - Herbert Stavely Sammond
- Winter 1938–Spring 1952 - Lawrence Rasmussen
- Winter 1952–Winter 1953 - No conductor
- Spring 1954–Spring 1956 - Donald Comrie
- Winter 1956–Spring 1959 - Frederick Heyne
- Winter 1959–Winter 1961 - Elizabeth DeMartini
- Spring 1962–Spring 1963 - James McEvers
- Winter 1963–Spring 1968 - Warren H. Brown
- Winter 1968–Winter 1969 - David Katz
- Spring 1970–Spring 2023 - David Close (Artistic Director & Conductor Emeritus)
- Winter 2023–present - Jin Byun
