= Peter Vallone Jr. =

American judge and lawyer (born 1961)

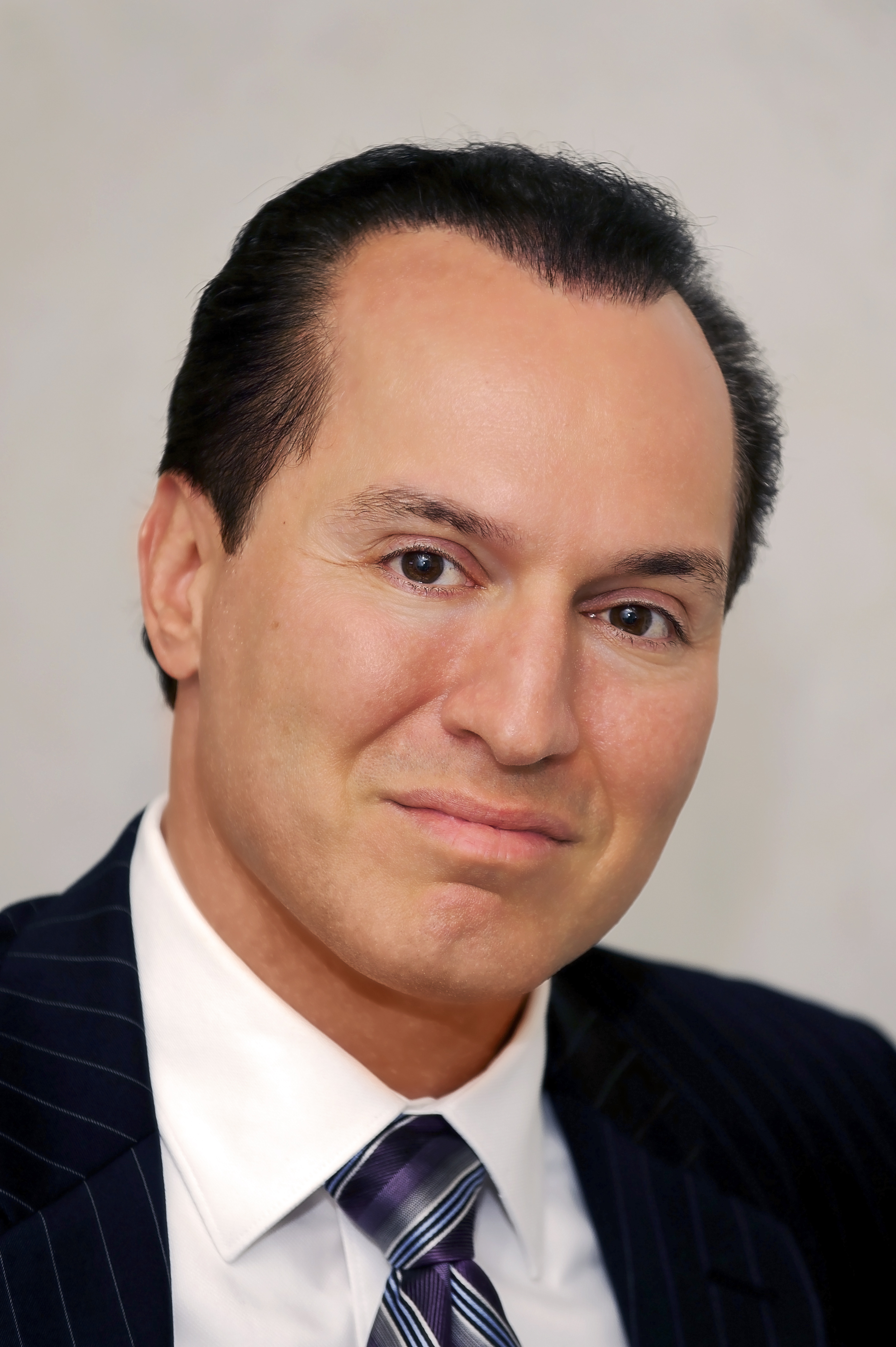
- Vallone in 2010

Judge of the New York Court of Claims
- Incumbent
- Assumed office June 19, 2017

Judge of the New York City Civil Court for Queens 3rd Municipal Court District
- In office January 1, 2016 – June 19, 2017
- Preceded by: Anna Culley
- Succeeded by: Tracy Catapano-Fox

Member of the New York City Council from the 22nd district
- In office January 1, 2002 – December 31, 2013
- Preceded by: Peter Vallone Sr.
- Succeeded by: Costa Constantinides
- Constituency: Queens: Astoria, Long Island City

Personal details
- Born: Peter Fortunate Vallone Jr. March 23, 1961 (age 65) New York City, U.S.
- Party: Democratic
- Relations: Peter Vallone Sr. (father), Charles J. Vallone (grandfather), Paul Vallone (brother)
- Education: Fordham University; Fordham University School of Law
- Occupation: Lawyer

Peter Fortunate Vallone Jr. (born March 23, 1961) is an American judge and lawyer.

Vallone was a member of the New York City Council representing the 22nd district, encompassing Astoria, Queens and the surrounding communities, from 2002 to 2013. Vallone served as Chair of the Council's Public Safety Committee.

== Early life and education ==
Vallone is the son of former New York City Council Speaker Peter Vallone Sr. He is also a grandson of Judge Charles J. Vallone of the Queens County Civil Court. He is the brother of former New York City Councilman Paul Vallone.

Vallone graduated from Fordham University in 1983 and from Fordham University School of Law in 1986.

== Career ==
Before being elected to the City Council, Vallone worked as an Assistant to the Manhattan District Attorney for six years.

Vallone served on the New York City Council from 2002 to 2013. He chaired the Council's Public Safety Committee. His notable legislation included several anti-graffiti bills.

Vallone opposes water fluoridation in New York. In April 2009, Vallone supported a proposed ban on pit bulls, Dobermans, Rottweilers, and other dogs weighing more than 25 lbs. in NYC public housing.

In 2013, Vallone ran for Queens borough president. He was defeated by Melinda Katz in the Democratic primary by 11 percentage points. In 2018, Vallone was fined for campaign finance violations in connection with his 2013 campaign for Queens borough president.

Following his stint on the City Council, Vallone took a job in the administration of Gov. Andrew Cuomo. Vallone served the Cuomo administration as a special assistant to the corrections commissioner.

Vallone was nominated to be a New York City Civil Court judge in Queens in May 2015, was elected to the post in November 2015, and was sworn in January 2016. Vallone served as a judge of the same court on which his grandfather, Judge Charles J. Vallone, served. Vallone was designated to serve as an acting justice of the Supreme Court, Queens County, Criminal Term in 2017. He was also appointed to the New York Court of Claims by Gov. Andrew Cuomo in 2017.

== Personal life ==
In 2010, Vallone was invited to play against the Chinese National Ping-Pong team on ABC's Wide World of Sports. He is a professional musician, playing four instruments.

Vallone and his former wife, Kristen Anne Canberg, had two daughters, Catherine (Casey) and Caroline. His brother, Paul Vallone, was elected to the City Council in the 19th district in 2013.

Political offices
Preceded by Peter Vallone Sr.	New York City Council, 22nd district 2002–2013	Succeeded by Costa Constantinides
