= Karen Koslowitz =

American politician (born 1941)

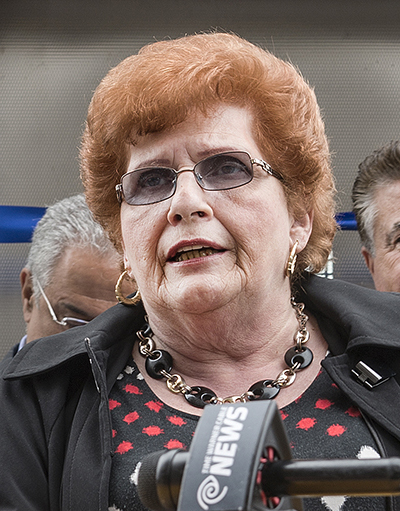

Member of the New York City Council from the 29th District
- In office January 1, 2010 – December 31, 2021
- Preceded by: Melinda Katz
- Succeeded by: Lynn Schulman
- In office February 26, 1991 – December 31, 2001
- Preceded by: Arthur Katzman
- Succeeded by: Melinda Katz

Personal details
- Born: March 14, 1941 (age 85) The Bronx, New York, U.S.
- Party: Democratic
- Education: James Monroe High School
- Website: Official website

Karen Koslowitz (March 14, 1941) is an American politician. She was the Council member for the 29th district of the New York City Council. She is a Democrat.

== Life and career ==
Koslowitz's parents immigrated to the United States from Kraków, Poland, settling in the Soundview section of the Bronx. She was raised in the Bronx, where she attended James Monroe High School. She has two daughters, Heidi and Marcia.

Koslowitz began her career in the private sector, at Fischbach and Moore, Inc., electrical contractors. She entered public service as a Legislative Aide for Congressman Gary Ackerman (D-NY), and subsequently for New York Council member Arthur Katzman. She then became the full-time Special Assistant and Queens Ombudsman to City Council President Andrew Stein.

From 2002 to 2009, Koslowitz served as Deputy Borough President in the administration of Queens Borough President Helen Marshall. Among her main responsibilities was to oversee Constituent Services and the borough’s 14 Community Boards.

== New York City Council ==
Koslowitz was elected to the New York City Council, representing the 29th district in Queens. The district includes Forest Hills, Rego Park, Maspeth, Kew Gardens, and Richmond Hill. She held this position starting in 1991 when she succeeded Arthur Katzman in a special election.

In 2001, Koslowitz stepped down because of term limits, remaining in government as an appointed Deputy Borough President for Queens. She returned to the City Council in 2009, winning in a five-person Democratic Primary with the backing of the local Democratic Party leadership. She was reelected in 2013 with 91 percent of the vote, defeating an independent candidate.

She has since supported a controversial street redesign that has eliminated 198 parking spaces, stating "We only had one side parking for many, many years". This was in opposition to John Dereszewski, head of Community Board 6's Transportation Committee, who said that while he supports “90 percent of the things that are going to be done,” he couldn't back the proposal because of the loss of nearly 200 parking spaces.

Election history
Location	Year	Election	Results
NYC Council District 29	1991	Special	√ Karen Koslowitz (D) Unopposed
NYC Council District 29	1991	General	√ Karen Koslowitz (D) 68.95% Donald A. Adolff (R) 31.05%
NYC Council District 29	1993	General	√ Karen Koslowitz (D) Unopposed
NYC Council District 29	1997	General	√ Karen Koslowitz (D) 91.15% Raymond S. Schneck (Conservative) 8.85%
NYC Council District 29	2009	Democratic Primary	√ Karen Koslowitz 25.89% Lynn C. Schulman 22.49% Heidi Harrison Chain 19.02% Albert Cohen 13.35% Michael Cohen 12.49% Melquiades Gagarin 6.76%
NYC Council District 29	2009	General	√ Karen Koslowitz (D) 91.27% Jon Torodash (I) 8.42%

Political offices
Preceded by Melinda Katz	New York City Council, 29th district 2010–2020	Incumbent
Preceded by Arthur Katzman	New York City Council, 29th district 1991-2001	Succeeded by Melinda Katz
