= George Grasso =

American judge and police officer

- Born: August 15, 1957; Hollis, New York, U.S.
- Police career
- Department: New York City Police Department
- Service years: 1979–2010
- Rank: First Deputy Commissioner

George A. Grasso (born August 15, 1957) is a retired judge from New York City. He is also a 30-year veteran of the New York City Police Department. He retired as first deputy police commissioner in 2010 to become a judge. Grasso retired as Administrative Judge, Queens County Supreme Court for Criminal Matters in August 2022.

He announced his candidacy for Queens District Attorney in October 2022. He was defeated by Melinda Katz.

== Early life and education ==
George Grasso was born in Hollis, Queens and grew up in Valley Stream, New York. His father, George, worked as a printer and his mother, Rosalie, worked as a homemaker and comptometer operator. In the 1920s, his grandparents, Maria and Angelo, immigrated to Brooklyn, NY from Avellino and Basilicata, Italy.

Grasso graduated from Valley Stream Central High School in 1975. He graduated from York College, City University of New York (magna cum laude) in January 1980 with a Bachelor of Arts in economics and a minor in political science. In his major, economics, Grasso graduated with a 4.0 GPA.

Earning a full-tuition scholarship, Grasso attended law school through night classes at St. John’s University. He graduated with a J.D. in 1984.

== Career ==
=== NYPD ===
In 1979, Grasso began his NYPD career as a police officer walking a beat in Southeast Queens. Throughout his 30 years in the NYPD, Grasso rose through the ranks serving as police officer, sergeant, lieutenant, captain, deputy inspector, and inspector. In January 1997, he was appointed by Police Commissioner Howard Safir to the position of Deputy Commissioner of Legal Matters. In January 2002, he was appointed by Police Commissioner Raymond Kelly to the position of First Deputy Police Commissioner, the highest rank ever attained by an Italian-American in the history of the NYPD.

Grasso spent 10 years of his NYPD career prosecuting police corruption, brutality, and misconduct cases.

In 2010, Grasso retired from the NYPD to accept a judgeship.

=== Judgeship ===
In 2010, Mayor Michael Bloomberg appointed Grasso to the New York City Criminal Court.

As citywide supervising judge for arraignments, Grasso reduced arrest to arraignment times throughout New York City. In 2014, Grasso was appointed as a co-chair on Mayor Bill de Blasio’s Behavioral Health Task Force. As a co-chair, Grasso led the development and implementation of New York City's first citywide supervised release program.

Grasso took a special interest in creating restorative justice programs for young people, such as Project Reset and DAT-Y. These programs were designed to foster consequential decision making and self-esteem in New York City's youth and eliminate all underlying charges.

Grasso was appointed supervising judge for Bronx Criminal Court in June 2016. In this role, he created the Overdose Avoidance and Recovery Court, which was expanded citywide. Under his supervision, the backlog of misdemeanor cases decreased over 80%.

In August 2021, Grasso became Administrative Judge for Criminal Matters for Queens Supreme Court. He led a citywide Gun Initiative to expedite the processing of Top Count Gun cases pending in New York City’s Criminal and Supreme Courts. He also created a diversion part to apply restorative justice principles to felony firearms possession cases for select cases involving defendants between the ages of 18 and 24 years old.

On August 31, 2022, Grasso retired from Queens Supreme Court.

=== Queens District Attorney campaign ===
In October 2022, Grasso announced his candidacy for Queens District Attorney. In announcing his candidacy, Grasso cited his long-standing concern regarding New York State bail laws and their impact on rising crime rates. He also cited the failure of New York State law to permit judges to consider potential danger when making decisions on bail and the overall undermining of the leverage of the court system. Grasso emphasized the central role of district attorneys in enforcing the law and maintaining public safety in the communities they were elected to serve by working within the full scope of their authority, while also continuing to engage in restorative justice practices. He was defeated by Melinda Katz, as he received 14.3% of the vote.

==== Election results ====
Queens County district attorney, Democratic primary, 2023
Party	Candidate	Votes	%
Democratic	Melinda Katz	44,601	71%
Democratic	George Grasso	8,969	14.3%
Democratic	Devian Shondel Daniels	8,799	14.0%

Police appointments
Preceded by Joseph Dunne	First Deputy New York City Police Commissioner; 2002-2010	Succeeded by Rafael Pineiro
