= Charles J. Vallone =

American judge

Charles J. Vallone (1902 – March 15, 1967) was an Italian-American judge from the state of New York. He served on the Queens County Civil Court.

== Life and career ==
Vallone was born in Prizzi, Italy in 1902. After arriving in the United States in 1906, he studied law at Fordham University, graduating in 1928. He founded his own law firm in 1932. Robert F. Wagner, Jr., the Mayor of New York City, appointed Vallone to the Municipal Court in 1955 to fill a vacancy in a seat held by Judge Harold Crawford.

Vallone lived in Astoria, Queens. He married Leah Palmigiano in 1931. He was the father of lawyer and politician Peter Vallone Sr. and the grandfather of lawyers and politicians Peter Vallone Jr. and Paul Vallone. The Judge Charles J. Vallone School is named after him.

Vallone died in his chambers in Kew Gardens, Queens on March 15, 1967.

Vallone's grandson, Peter Vallone Jr., became a judge of the New York City Civil Court in Queens; this is the same court on which his grandfather served.
