= Sharon Lee (politician) =

American politician

20th Borough President of Queens
- In office January 1, 2020 – December 2, 2020
- Preceded by: Melinda Katz
- Succeeded by: Donovan Richards

Personal details
- Party: Democratic
- Education: University of Wisconsin, Madison

Sharon Lee is an American Democratic former politician from New York City. From January 2020 to December 2020, she served as the acting borough president of Queens during the height of the COVID-19 pandemic in New York City. She was the first person of Asian descent to serve as a borough president in the City of New York.

== Early years ==
Lee grew up in California, and attended the University of Wisconsin, where she heard John Liu, a member of the New York City Councill, speak at a student conference, and was inspired to go into politics. She applied for an internship in his office, which brought her to Queens.

== Political career ==
Lee served as policy director and press secretary for Liu in 2006, and became his senior advisor and press secretary when he was elected New York City Comptroller in 2009. She helped implement priorities such as the pension investment reform proposal of 2011 between Liu and Mayor Michael Bloomberg, and Retirement Security Initiative NYC in 2011 between Liu and the Schwartz Center for Economic Policy Analysis. Lee helped develop and execute strategies for transparency initiatives such as Checkbook NYC in 2010 that launched access to information about the city's expenditures, and MWBE (minority and/or women-owned business enterprise) Report Card NYC in 2021, a performance measurement tool to publicly track city agencies' progress in achieving their MWBE goals. She was also a member of the team that identified and exposed the fraud and mismanagement in the CityTime payroll scandal in 2010, which led to the recoupment of $500 million for the City of New York.

Lee became communications director for Queens Borough President Melinda Katz in November 2014, and Katz appointed her as deputy borough president in November 2018. When Katz was elected Queens County District Attorney in November 2019, Lee served as executive director of her transition committee.

She then took over as acting borough president in January 2020. Lee had been expected to be acting borough president for a relatively short period, only until a special election, which had been scheduled for March 24. However, voting became impossible and was postponed because of the onset of the COVID-19 pandemic in New York City, so she served for 11 months, until the votes in the regular scheduled November were certified, and oversaw the borough's response to the COVID-19 pandemic.

As the COVID-19 pandemic devastated the borough, Lee managed the distribution of tons of pounds of food and support for small businesses, a dozen virtual job fairs for out-of-work New Yorkers, 2020 presidential election amidst the pandemic, funding for hospital services including doubling the number of sexual assault nurse examiners in Queens hospitals, championed racial justice in the wake of the police murder of George Floyd, and helped boost Queens County's count in the 2020 United States Census.

Some of her public investments included a $1 million allocation to fully fund the New York City Fire Department's Decontamination Specialization Unit in Queens to purchase and install new equipment necessary for cleaning firefighters' equipment, and a $5.4 million allocation to fund cancer treatment technology at the oncology unit of Elmhurst Hospital, one of Queens' two public hospitals. Lee also weighed in on land use issues, including a recommendation opposing the 2020 Flushing Waterfront rezoning plan.

Lee was an early outspoken leader amidst the rise in anti-Asian hate, especially in the wake of the Atlanta spa shootings. Lee also opposed cuts in healthcare spending. She did not run for election in 2020.

After serving nearly a year as acting borough president, Lee left politics, and as of 2025, she is a partner at Eve & Co., an investment advisory company.
