= Michael Cohen (politician) =

American politician

Member of the New York State Assembly from the 28th district
- In office January 6, 1999 – March 14, 2005
- Preceded by: Melinda Katz
- Succeeded by: Andrew D. Hevesi

Personal details
- Born: July 19, 1949 (age 77) Queens, New York, U.S.
- Party: Democratic
- Profession: Politician

Michael L. "Mike" Cohen (born July 19, 1949) was a Democratic member of the New York State Assembly, representing the 28th Assembly District in Queens County, New York.

== Biography ==
A former New York City Transit worker, Cohen was involved with the transit unions and was elected to the local community board.

In 1994, he ran for the New York State Assembly as a local Democratic district leader and the Queens Democratic Party candidate against Melinda Katz, who ran on the Liberal and Good Government party lines, but Katz won by eight percentage points.

In 1999 he began his first term in the New York State Assembly. He resigned from the Assembly effective March 14, 2005. The seat was filled in a special election won by Andrew Hevesi, the son of former New York State Comptroller Alan Hevesi.

In April 2009, then New York State Attorney General Andrew Cuomo charged New York Liberal Party leader Raymond Harding with accepting more than $800,000 in exchange for political favors for Alan Hevesi. Harding was also accused of helping arrange a $150,000-a-year position for Cohen with the Health Insurance Plan of New York (HIP), in order to clear the Assembly seat for a run by Hevesi's son. Neither Cohen nor Hevesi were charged with any wrongdoing.

Cohen ran for New York City Council in 2009, seeking to represent City Council District 29 which includes the Queens neighborhoods of Forest Hills, Rego Park, and Kew Gardens. He lost the September 2009 Democratic primary election to Karen Koslowitz, who went on to win the November 2009 general election.

== Election results ==
=== State Assembly ===
- November 1998 general election, NYS Assembly, 28th AD

Michael Cohen (DEM)	...	15,970
Matthew D. Hunter (REP – CON – IND – LIB)	...	8,266

- November 2000 general election, NYS Assembly, 28th AD

Michael Cohen (DEM – IND – LIB)	...	24,670
Michael Roemmelt (REP – CON)	...	9,271

- November 2002 general election, NYS Assembly, 28th AD

Michael Cohen (DEM – LIB – WOR)	...	12,892
Todd C. Bank (REP – CON)	...	6,641

- November 2004 general election, NYS Assembly, 28th AD

Michael L. Cohen (DEM – IND)	...	23,674
Michael D. Weiss (REP)	...	10,173

=== City Council, Democratic primary ===
- September 2009 Democratic primary election, City Council, 29th District

Karen Koslowitz	...	1,937
Lynn C. Schulman	...	1,647
Heidi Harrison Chain	...	1,442
Michael Cohen	...	983
Albert Cohen	...	950
Melquiades Gagarin	...	464

New York State Assembly
Preceded by Melinda Katz	Member of the New York State Assembly from the 28th district 1999–2005	Succeeded by Andrew D. Hevesi
