= New York City's 22nd City Council district =

- Boundaries following the 2020 census

Government
  - Councilmember: Tiffany Cabán (D–Woodside)

Population (2010)
  - Total: 146,509

Demographics
  - White: 52%
  - Hispanic: 25%
  - Asian: 13%
  - Black: 8%
  - Other: 3%

Registration
  - Democratic: 64.8%
  - Republican: 9.6%
  - No party preference: 22.3%
- Registered voters (2021) 101,328

New York City's 22nd City Council district is one of 51 districts in the New York City Council. It has been represented by Democrat Tiffany Cabán since December 2021.

== Geography ==
District 22 is based in northern Astoria in Queens, also covering parts of East Elmhurst, and Woodside. Rikers Island, which is officially part of the Bronx, is located within the district.

The district overlaps with Queens Community Boards 1 and 3, and with New York's 12th and 14th congressional districts. It also overlaps with the 12th and 13th districts of the New York State Senate, and with the 30th, 34th, 35th, 36th, and 37th districts of the New York State Assembly.

== Recent election results ==
=== 2025 ===
2025 New York City Council election, District 22
Party	Candidate	Votes	%
Democratic	Tiffany Cabán	30,066	
Working Families	Tiffany Cabán	9,946	
Total	Tiffany Cabán (incumbent)	40,012	97.4
Write-in		1,062	2.6
Total votes		41,074	100.0
Democratic hold			

=== 2023 (redistricting) ===
Due to redistricting and the 2020 changes to the New York City Charter, councilmembers elected during the 2021 and 2023 City Council elections will serve two-year terms, with full four-year terms resuming after the 2025 New York City Council elections.

2023 New York City Council election, District 22
Primary election
Party	Candidate	Votes	%
Democratic	Tiffany Cabán (incumbent)	5,303	84.8
Democratic	Charles Castro	869	13.9
Write-in		83	1.3
Total votes		6,255	100.0
General election
Democratic	Tiffany Cabán	7,294	
Working Families	Tiffany Cabán	2,445	
Total	Tiffany Cabán (incumbent)	9,739	69.3
Republican	Kelly Klingman	3,789	
Conservative	Kelly Klingman	415	
Total	Kelly Klingman	4,204	29.9
Write-in		113	0.8
Total votes		14,056	100.0
Democratic hold			

=== 2021 ===
In 2019, voters in New York City approved Ballot Question 1, which implemented ranked-choice voting in all local elections. Under the new system, voters have the option to rank up to five candidates for every local office. Voters whose first-choice candidates fare poorly will have their votes redistributed to other candidates in their ranking until one candidate surpasses the 50 percent threshold. If one candidate surpasses 50 percent in first-choice votes, then ranked-choice tabulations will not occur.

2021 New York City Council election, District 22 Democratic primary
Party	Candidate	Maximum round	Maximum votes	Share in maximum round	Maximum votes First round votes Transfer votes
Democratic	Tiffany Cabán	3	9,088	62.6%	
Democratic	Evie Hantzopoulos	3	5,424	37.4%	
Democratic	John Ciafone	2	1,622	10.0%	
Democratic	Leonardo Bullaro	2	1,221	7.5%	
Democratic	Catherina Gioino	2	804	5.0%	
Democratic	Nick Velkov	2	463	2.9%	
Write-in		1	30	0.2%	

An interactive map of District 22

2021 New York City Council election, District 22 general election
Party	Candidate	Votes	%
Democratic	Tiffany Cabán	12,885	63.4
Republican	Felicia Kalan	5,563	
Conservative	Felicia Kalan	646	
Total	Felicia Kalan	6,209	30.5
Green	Edwin DeJesus	1,172	5.8
Write-in		53	0.3
Total votes		20,319	100
Democratic hold			

=== 2017 ===
2017 New York City Council election, District 22
Party	Candidate	Votes	%
Democratic	Costa Constantinides	15,164	
Working Families	Costa Constantinides	2,251	
Total	Costa Constantinides (incumbent)	17,415	92.9
Dive In	Kathleen Springer	1,223	6.5
Write-in		98	0.6
Total votes		18,736	100
Democratic hold			

=== 2013 ===
2013 New York City Council election, District 22
Primary election
Party	Candidate	Votes	%
Democratic	Costa Constantinides	4,461	55.7
Democratic	John Ciafone	1,791	22.4
Democratic	Constantinos Prentzas	1,750	21.9
Write-in		1	0.0
Total votes		8,003	100
General election
Democratic	Costa Constantinides	10,171	
Working Families	Costa Constantinides	711	
Total	Costa Constantinides	10,882	65.4
Green	Lynne Serpe	2,461	14.8
Republican	Daniel Peterson	1,884	11.3
Conservative	Danielle de Stefano	1,018	
Independence	Danielle de Stefano	295	
Total	Danielle de Stefano	1,313	7.9
Populist	Gerald Kann	65	0.4
Write-in		24	0.2
Total votes		16,629	100
Democratic hold			
