= Richard Brown (lawyer) =

American attorney and judge (1932–2019)

Richard A. Brown

District Attorney of Queens County
- In office June 1, 1991 – May 4, 2019; Interim: June 1, 1991 – December 31, 1991
- Chief Assistant: John M. Ryan (1997-2019)
- Preceded by: John J. Santucci
- Succeeded by: John M. Ryan (acting)

Personal details
- Born: Richard Allen Brown; November 13, 1932 Brooklyn, New York, U.S.
- Died: May 4, 2019 (aged 86) Redding, Connecticut, U.S.
- Party: Democratic
- Spouse: Rhoda Steinberg (m. 1960)
- Education: Hobart College (BA); New York University (LLB)
- Occupation: District Attorney

Richard Allen Brown (November 13, 1932 – May 4, 2019) was an American attorney and judge from the State of New York. He was the District Attorney of Queens County, having held office from 1991 until his death in 2019. Prior to becoming district attorney, Brown served as a judge of the New York Supreme Court, Appellate Division, Second Department. Brown was the longest serving district attorney in New York City. Brown died at the age of 86 in 2019.

Legal offices
Preceded by John J. Santucci	Queens County District Attorney; 1991–2019	Succeeded by John M. Ryan; Acting
