= New York City's 29th City Council district =

- Boundaries following the 2020 census

Government
  - Councilmember: Lynn Schulman (D–Forest Hills)

Population (2010)
  - Total: 147,922

Demographics
  - White: 47%
  - Asian: 28%
  - Hispanic: 18%
  - Black: 4%
  - Other: 4%

Registration
  - Democratic: 57.7%
  - Republican: 14.2%
  - No party preference: 24.8%
- Registered voters (2021) 103,308

New York City's 29th City Council district is one of 51 districts in the New York City Council. It has been represented by Democrat Lynn Schulman since 2022. Schulman succeeded Karen Koslowitz, who was term-limited in 2021.

== Geography ==
District 29 is based in Forest Hills in central Queens, also covering Kew Gardens, and eastern Richmond Hill.

The district overlaps with Queens Community Boards 5, 6, and 9, Community Board 12 [12]and with New York's 5th and 6th congressional districts. It also overlaps with the 10th, 14th, 15th, and 16th districts of the New York State Senate, and with the 24th, 27th, 28th, 30th, and 35th districts of the New York State Assembly.

== Recent election results ==
=== 2025 ===
2025 New York City Council election, District 29
| Party | Candidate | Votes | % |
|---|---|---|---|
| Democratic | Lynn Schulman (incumbent) | 28,866 | 72.3 |
| Republican | Jonathan Rinaldi | 10,906 | 27.3 |
| Write-in | | 151 | 0.4 |
| Total votes | | 39,923 | 100.0 |
| Democratic hold | | | |

=== 2023 (redistricting) ===
Due to redistricting and the 2020 changes to the New York City Charter, councilmembers elected during the 2021 and 2023 City Council elections will serve two-year terms, with full four-year terms resuming after the 2025 New York City Council elections.

2023 New York City Council election, District 29
Primary election
| Party | Candidate | Votes | % |
|---|---|---|---|
| Democratic | Lynn Schulman (incumbent) | 3,480 | 54.2 |
| Democratic | Ethan Felder | 2,204 | 34.3 |
| Democratic | Sukhi Singh | 683 | 10.6 |
| Write-in | | 50 | 0.8 |
| Total votes | | 6,417 | 100.0 |
General election
| Democratic | Lynn Schulman (incumbent) | 8,195 | 68.1 |
| Republican | Danniel Maio | 2,917 | |
| Conservative | Danniel Maio | 335 | |
| Total | Danniel Maio | 3,252 | 27.0 |
| Common Sense | Sukhi Singh | 512 | 4.3 |
| Write-in | | 76 | 0.6 |
| Total votes | | 12,035 | 100 |
| Democratic hold | | | |

=== 2021 ===
In 2019, voters in New York City approved Ballot Question 1, which implemented ranked-choice voting in all local elections. Under the new system, voters have the option to rank up to five candidates for every local office. Voters whose first-choice candidates fare poorly will have their votes redistributed to other candidates in their ranking until one candidate surpasses the 50 percent threshold. If one candidate surpasses 50 percent in first-choice votes, then ranked-choice tabulations will not occur.

2021 New York City Council election, District 29 Democratic primary
| Party | Candidate | Maximum round | Maximum votes | Share in maximum round | Maximum votes First round votes Transfer votes |
|---|---|---|---|---|---|
| Democratic | Lynn Schulman | 8 | 7,232 | 60.0% | |
| Democratic | Aleda Gagarin | 8 | 4,825 | 40.0% | |
| Democratic | David Aronov | 7 | 4,135 | 28.8% | |
| Democratic | Donghui Zang | 6 | 3,012 | 19.2% | |
| Democratic | Avi Cyperstein | 5 | 2,183 | 13.4% | |
| Democratic | Edwin Wong | 4 | 1,541 | 9.3% | |
| Democratic | Doug Shapiro | 3 | 1,366 | 8.1% | |
| Democratic | Eliseo Labayen | 2 | 692 | 4.0% | |
| Democratic | Sheryl Fetik | 2 | 487 | 2.8% | |
| Write-in | | 1 | 41 | 0.2% | |

An interactive map of District 29

2021 New York City Council election, District 29 general election
| Party | Candidate | Votes | % |
|---|---|---|---|
| Democratic | Lynn Schulman | 13,939 | 60.8 |
| Republican | Michael Conigliaro | 8,058 | |
| Conservative | Michael Conigliaro | 869 | |
| Total | Michael Conigliaro | 8,927 | 38.9 |
| Write-in | | 58 | 0.3 |
| Total votes | | 22,924 | 100 |
| Democratic hold | | | |

=== 2017 ===
2017 New York City Council election, District 29
| Party | Candidate | Votes | % |
|---|---|---|---|
| Democratic | Karen Koslowitz (incumbent) | 15,863 | 97.6 |
| Write-in | | 383 | 2.4 |
| Total votes | | 16,246 | 100 |
| Democratic hold | | | |

=== 2013 ===
2013 New York City Council election, District 29
| Party | Candidate | Votes | % |
|---|---|---|---|
| Democratic | Karen Koslowitz | 14,173 | |
| Working Families | Karen Koslowitz | 1,355 | |
| Total | Karen Koslowitz (incumbent) | 15,528 | 91.2 |
| Civic Virtue | Jon Torodash | 1,433 | 8.4 |
| Write-in | | 53 | 0.4 |
| Total votes | | 17,014 | 100 |
| Democratic hold | | | |
