= New York's 86th State Assembly district =

American legislative district

Assemblymember
Yudelka Tapia; D–Fordham

New York's 86th State Assembly district is one of the 150 districts in the New York State Assembly. It has been represented by Democrat Yudelka Tapia since 2021.

== Geography ==
=== 2020s ===
District 86 is located in The Bronx, centered around University Heights and Fordham, with portions of Morris Heights, Mount Eden, Kingsbridge and Tremont.

The district is overlapped by New York's 13th and 15th congressional districts, as well as the 31st, 32nd and 33rd districts of the New York State Senate and the 14th, 15th and 16th districts of the New York City Council.

=== 2010s ===
District 86 is located in The Bronx, comprising University Heights, Morris Heights, Mount Eden, Kingsbridge, Tremont and Fordham.

== Recent election results ==
=== 2026 ===
2026 New York State Assembly election, District 86
Primary election
Party	Candidate	Votes	%
Republican	Maria Diaz	122	59.2
Republican	Shery Olivo	76	36.9
Write-in		8	3.9
Total votes		206	100.0
General election
Democratic	Yudelka Tapia (incumbent)		
Republican	Maria Diaz		
Conservative	Shery Olivo		
Write-in			
Total votes			100.0

=== 2024 ===
2024 New York State Assembly election, District 86
Party	Candidate	Votes	%
Democratic	Yudelka Tapia (incumbent)	17,491	74.4
Republican	Woodrow Hines Jr.	5,369	22.8
Conservative	Darney Rivers	598	2.6
Write-in		47	0.2
Total votes		23,505	100.0
Democratic hold			

=== 2022 ===
2022 New York State Assembly election, District 86
Primary election
Party	Candidate	Votes	%
Democratic	Yudelka Tapia (incumbent)	2,299	81.7
Democratic	Pooi Stewart	495	17.6
Write-in		19	0.7
Total votes		2,813	100.0
General election
Democratic	Yudelka Tapia	8,425	
Working Families	Yudelka Tapia	349	
Total	Yudelka Tapia (incumbent)	8,774	83.0
Republican	Betty Obregon	1,793	16.9
Write-in		10	0.1
Total votes		10,577	100.0
Democratic hold			

=== 2021 special ===
Then-incumbent assemblyman Victor Pichardo resigned for personal reasons in August 2021, triggering a special election. In special elections for state legislative offices, primaries are usually not held - county committee members for each party select nominees. The special election was held on the same day as general citywide elections, including the mayoral, city council and borough presidential elections.

2021 New York State Assembly special election, District 86
Party	Candidate	Votes	%
Democratic	Yudelka Tapia	5,648	99.4
Write-in		35	0.6
Total votes		5,683	100.0
Democratic hold			

=== 2020 ===
2020 New York State Assembly election, District 86
Party	Candidate	Votes	%
Democratic	Victor M. Pichardo (incumbent)	25,338	87.7
Republican	Lorraine Zeigler	3,472	12.0
Write-in		69	0.3
Total votes		28,879	100.0
Democratic hold			

=== 2018 ===
2018 New York State Assembly election, District 86
Party	Candidate	Votes	%
Democratic	Victor M. Pichardo	18,515	
Working Families	Victor M. Pichardo	298	
Total	Victor M. Pichardo (incumbent)	18,813	95.7
Republican	Ariel Rivera-Diaz	748	3.8
Conservative	Jose Marte	96	0.5
Write-in		0	0.0
Total votes		19,657	100.0
Democratic hold			

=== 2016 ===
2016 New York State Assembly election, District 86
Primary election
Party	Candidate	Votes	%
Democratic	Victor M. Pichardo (incumbent)	2,795	66.4
Democratic	Hector Ramirez	1,383	32.9
Write-in		28	0.7
Total votes		4,206	100.0
General election
Democratic	Victor M. Pichardo	22,597	
Working Families	Victor M. Pichardo	599	
Total	Victor M. Pichardo (incumbent)	23,196	97.7
Conservative	Jose Marte	530	2.2
Write-in		16	0.1
Total votes		23,742	100.0
Democratic hold			

=== 2014 ===
2014 New York State Assembly election, District 86
Primary election
Party	Candidate	Votes	%
Democratic	Victor M. Pichardo (incumbent)	1,885	49.9
Democratic	Hector Ramirez	1,879	49.7
Write-in		17	0.4
Total votes		3,781	100.0
General election
Democratic	Victor M. Pichardo	7,596	
Working Families	Victor M. Pichardo	257	
Total	Victor M. Pichardo (incumbent)	7,853	94.9
Republican	Rene Santos	315	3.8
Conservative	Jose Marte	90	1.1
Write-in		18	0.2
Total votes		8,276	100.0
Democratic hold			

=== 2013 special ===
Incumbent Nelson Castro resigned in 2013 following his role in an FBI investigation, triggering a special election. In special elections for state legislative offices, primaries are usually not held - county committee members for each party select nominees. However, due to its proximity to the 2013 New York City Council election, party-specific primaries were held.

2013 New York State Assembly special election, District 86
Primary election
Party	Candidate	Votes	%
Democratic	Victor M. Pichardo	1,250	23.4
Democratic	Hector Ramirez	1,178	22.1
Democratic	Yudelka Tapia	1,066	19.9
Democratic	Haile Rivera	708	13.3
Democratic	Melanie Johnson	499	9.3
Democratic	Elizabeth Ortiz	442	8.3
Democratic	Keny Nunez	197	3.7
Write-in		0	0.0
Total votes		5,340	100.0
General election
Democratic	Victor M. Pichardo	7,174	
Working Families	Victor M. Pichardo	159	
Total	Victor M. Pichardo	7,333	95.4
Republican	Rene Santos	243	3.2
Conservative	Jose Marte	103	1.3
Write-in		7	0.1
Total votes		7,686	100.0
Democratic hold			

=== 2012 ===
2012 New York State Assembly election, District 86
Primary election
Party	Candidate	Votes	%
Democratic	Nelson Castro (incumbent)	2,556	84.4
Democratic	Richard Soto	467	15.4
Write-in		6	0.2
Total votes		3,029	100.0
General election
Democratic	Nelson Castro	22,801	
Working Families	Nelson Castro	288	
Total	Nelson Castro (incumbent)	23,089	96.5
Republican	Ana Sanchez	698	2.9
Conservative	Vhidiwhatie Diamond	145	0.6
Write-in		1	0.0
Total votes		23,933	100.0
Democratic hold			

=== 2010 ===
2010 New York State Assembly election, District 86
Primary election
Party	Candidate	Votes	%
Democratic	Nelson Castro (incumbent)	2,181	53.6
Democratic	Hector Ramirez	1,888	46.4
Write-in		3	0.0
Total votes		4,072	100.0
General election
Democratic	Nelson Castro (incumbent)	7,613	77.4
Working Families	Hector Ramirez	1,698	17.3
Republican	Rene Santos	324	3.3
Conservative	Lisa Marie Campbell	199	2.0
Write-in		6	0.0
Total votes		9,841	100.0
Democratic hold			

=== 2008 ===
2008 New York State Assembly election, District 86
Primary election
Party	Candidate	Votes	%
Democratic	Nelson Castro (incumbent)	1,597	61.5
Democratic	Mike Soto	998	38.5
Write-in			0.0
Total votes		2,595	100.0
General election
Democratic	Nelson Castro (incumbent)	18,248	95.3
Republican	Lisa Marie Campbell	762	
Conservative	Lisa Marie Campbell	148	
Total	Lisa Marie Campbell	910	4.7
Write-in		0	0.0
Total votes		19,158	100.0
Democratic hold			
