= Adolfo Carrión Jr. =

American politician (born 1961)

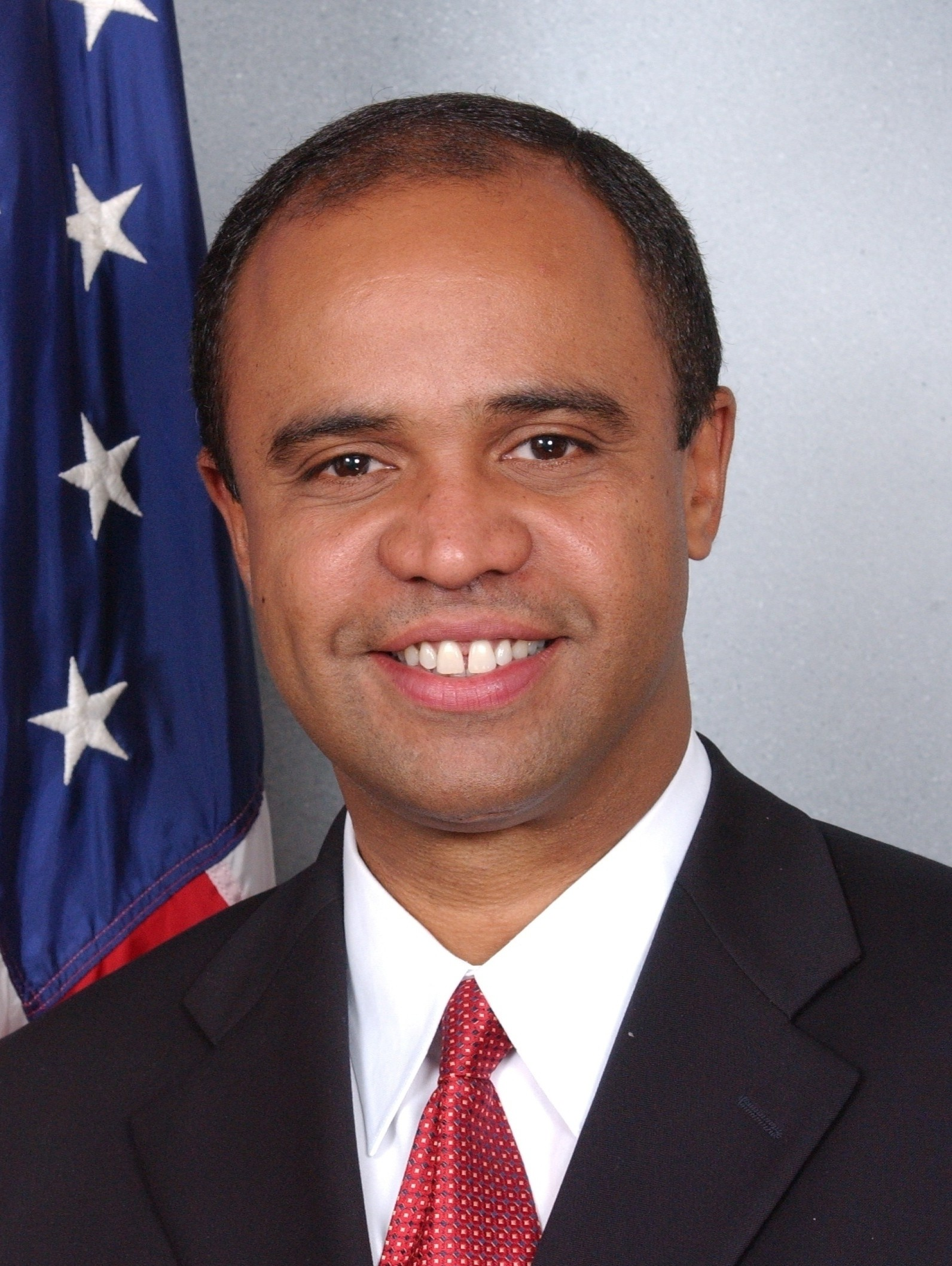
- Official portrait, 2009

Deputy Mayor of New York City for Housing, Economic Development and Workforce
- In office March 14, 2025 – December 31, 2025
- Mayor: Eric Adams
- Preceded by: Maria Torres-Springer
- Succeeded by: Leila Bozorg (as deputy mayor for housing and planning)

Commissioner of the New York City Department of Housing Preservation and Development
- In office January 30, 2022 – March 14, 2025
- Mayor: Eric Adams
- Preceded by: Louise Carroll
- Succeeded by: Ahmed Tigani (acting)

Director of the White House Office of Urban Affairs
- In office February 2009 – May 3, 2010
- President: Barack Obama
- Preceded by: Position established
- Succeeded by: Derek Douglas (acting)

12th Borough President of The Bronx
- In office January 1, 2002 – February 26, 2009
- Preceded by: Fernando Ferrer
- Succeeded by: Rubén Díaz Jr.

Member of the New York City Council from the 14th district
- In office January 1, 1998 – December 31, 2001
- Preceded by: Israel Ruiz Jr.
- Succeeded by: Maria Baez

Personal details
- Born: March 6, 1961 (age 65) Manhattan, New York, U.S.
- Party: Democratic
- Spouse: Linda Baldwin
- Children: 4
- Education: Kings College, New York (BA); Hunter College (MUP)

Adolfo Carrión Jr. (born March 6, 1961) is an American businessman and former elected official from City Island in New York City. He served one term as a member of the New York City Council, representing the 14th district. He served for seven years as the borough president of the Bronx, for a year and five months as the first director of the White House Office of Urban Affairs (HUD) in the Obama administration, and then for nearly two years as Regional Administrator for HUD's New York and New Jersey Regional Office. He left HUD in February 2012.

In late 2012, Carrión registered as an Independent, to begin exploring a run for Mayor of New York City, and in February 2013 he was granted the Independence Party nomination. Carrión was appointed Commissioner of the New York City Department of Housing Preservation and Development by Mayor Eric Adams on January 30, 2022. On March 7, 2025, Carrión was appointed New York City Deputy Mayor for Housing, Economic Development, and Workforce, effective March 14, 2025.

== Background ==
Adolfo Carrión was born in Manhattan, New York City, in 1961. His family moved to the Baychester section of the Northeast Bronx when he was in fourth grade. He attended public school at PS 34 (Manhattan), PS 111 (the Bronx), and John Philip Sousa Middle School and Harry S. Truman High School in the Bronx. Later, he graduated from The King's College, a Christian liberal arts college in Westchester County at the time, where he majored in world religions and philosophy. He followed in the footsteps of his father, a Protestant minister, and became an associate pastor at a Bronx church.

Carrión went on to serve as a public school teacher in the West Bronx at Intermediate School 115 and CIS 234. During that time he participated in CCNY-based Salvadori Center program which uses the built environment as a teaching tool. Eventually, he went back to school to earn his master's degree in urban planning from Hunter College, part of the City University of New York. Upon graduating, Carrión worked for three years at the Bronx office of the New York City Department of City Planning.

He later served as district manager for Community Board 5 in the Bronx (where he was responsible for overseeing the delivery of services to 150,000 residents within his district), was hired as vice president of human services and community outreach at Promesa, a community development organization, and served as chairman of the Bronx Puerto Rican Day Parade.

He currently lives with his wife, Linda Baldwin, an attorney and former city planning colleague, and his children, Raquel, Sara, Olivia, and Adolfo James (A.J.) on City Island.

== Political career ==
Carrión ran for New York City Council in 1997. He won the election and served one four-year term representing the 14th district, which includes the West Bronx neighborhoods of University Heights, Morris Heights, Kingsbridge, and Fordham. While on the council, Carrión belonged to its committees on Economic Development, Education, Higher Education, Environmental Protection, Governmental Operations and Land Use. He also served as chairman of the Special Subcommittee on the 2000 Census.

Although council members are allowed to seek reelection, Carrión did not run for a second term. He had been rumored to be a leading candidate to become the next speaker of the city council, but he chose instead to run in the hotly contested 2001 election to succeed Bronx borough president Freddy Ferrer, who was at that time prevented under the City Charter from seeking a third term in office. He edged out then-Councilmember June Eisland and State Senator Pedro Espada Jr. for the Democratic nomination and then won the general election on November 6, 2001, with a landslide 79% of the vote. He easily won reelection in 2005 with 87%.

Adolfo Carrión would have been limited by the City Charter from seeking a third term as borough president until a narrow October 2008 vote of the New York City Council allowed third terms for elected city officials (including incumbent Mayor Michael Bloomberg). The media frequently speculated that Carrión would be a candidate for Mayor of New York City in 2009. However, on December 13, 2007, Carrión announced that he would be a candidate for New York City Comptroller in the 2009 election.

On December 6, 2008, Carrión announced in a speech at Yale University that President-elect Barack Obama had selected him for a cabinet-level position. In February 2009, he took office as director of the newly created White House Office of Urban Affairs Policy. Carrión's work at the White House resulted in the establishment of a White House Urban Policy Working Group and the first interagency review in 30 years of the federal government's engagement with urban and metropolitan areas.

Carrión's position at the Domestic Policy Council ended on May 3, 2010, when the Obama administration named Carrión Regional Director for HUD's New York and New Jersey Regional Office. He left HUD in February, 2012. As Regional Administrator, Carrión was responsible for overseeing nearly $6 billion in HUD investments in New York and New Jersey.

On February 26, 2013, Carrion announced during an interview with the EFE news agency, that he would run for the Mayor of New York as an independent candidate. He also unsuccessfully pursued a Wilson Pakula designation to secure a spot in the Republican primary.

Carrion returned to City Hall in 2025 when then-mayor Eric Adams named him a deputy mayor in March of that year.

== Affiliations ==
Aspen Institute

Carrión was chosen by the Aspen Institute as one of 24 of America's most promising emerging leaders to be a member of the Aspen-Rodel Fellowship in Public Leadership. The fellowship consists of 12 Republicans and 12 Democrats and focuses on the ethics and responsibilities of public office and teaching democratic principles. This is only the second class of fellows from the institute, and Carrión is the only member from New York.

National Association of Latino Elected and Appointed Officials (NALEO)

On July 1, 2007, Adolfo Carrión was elected president of NALEO, the nonpartisan leadership organization of the nation's 6,000 Latino elected and appointed officials. As President, he announced an increase in efforts to help file naturalization papers for eligible legal permanent residents before impending fee increases take effect as part of NALEO's "ya es hora" campaign. He previously served as vice president and Treasurer. NALEO is a national organization that offers training and technical assistance to enhance the leadership skills and political empowerment of Latino appointed and elected officials.

New York Blood Center

Adolfo Carrión serves as the Chair of the Volunteer Leadership Team of the New York Blood Center in the Bronx. As the Bronx Chair, he helps the NY Blood Center meet its goal of closing the blood deficit that forces the New York region to rely on donations from other parts of the country.

== Projects ==
=== Yankee Stadium ===
After his election as borough president, Carrión helped to bring the city and George Steinbrenner, owner of the New York Yankees, together for negotiations over the construction of a new Yankee Stadium.

Early in his presidency, Carrión had advocated Community Benefits Agreements intended to ensure that construction in the borough would help as many residents as possible. In the end, $800 million will be invested in construction of a new Yankee Stadium with at least 25% of the contracts going to Bronx businesses and at least 25% of the jobs going to residents of the Borough. In addition, $160 million will be invested in many public parks including a running track, tennis facilities, and softball and baseball fields on parkland around and including the original Yankee Stadium. Carrión has helped to bring in funding to improve other parts of the community, including $65 million to be invested in restoration of the pedestrian Highbridge, the oldest bridge in New York City which connects the Bronx to Manhattan, and $91 million to be invested in constructing a new Metro-North Station at the new Yankee Stadium. Also being planned in the area is a Yankee Stadium Sports Museum and a 30,000-square-foot (2,800 m^{2}) fitness/health club.

=== Bronx Terminal Market ===
Just south of the new Yankee Stadium is the 1,000,000-square-foot (93,000 m^{2}) Gateway Center at Bronx Terminal Market, which replaced a dilapidated public market and the closed Bronx House of Detention.

=== Hunts Point Vision Plan ===
Carrión worked with Mayor Bloomberg and community leaders to re-envision 690-acre (2.8 km^{2}) industrial area on the Bronx waterfront. Key components of the plan include $110 million invested by the city for infrastructure improvements, $85 million development of the Fulton Fish Market at Hunts Point, $25 million development of the Produce Market, the construction of the new Barretto Point Park, the South Bronx Greenway Initiative, and a re-use plan for the Marine Transfer Station which As of 2007 is still in negotiations.

== Issues and controversies ==
=== Party affiliation ===
Until the New York City Charter was amended in 2008, it prevented Carrión from seeking a third term as borough president. He raised money for citywide office and it was widely speculated that he was contemplating running for Mayor of New York City. On December 13, 2007, however, he announced that he was running in the 2009 New York City Comptroller's race to replace the existing Comptroller (Bill Thompson) who, at the time, was also term limited. As events turned out in 2009, Thompson ran for Mayor while Carrión left the borough presidency before the end of his second term in order to accept his post in the Obama administration.

=== Navy bombing exercises in Puerto Rico ===
In 2001, he and three others including the Rev. Al Sharpton travelled to Puerto Rico to protest the Navy's bombing exercises on the island of Vieques. The "Vieques Four" were imprisoned by the federal government for more than 40 days for protesting the policy. Their actions led to President Bush's imposition of a permanent moratorium on weapons testing on the island

=== Fire in the Bronx ===
On March 7, 2007, a fire engulfed the row house at 1022 Woodycrest Ave in the Bronx, killing 8 children and one woman. The two families affected were those of Moussa Magassa, who lost four children, and Mamadou Soumare, who lost four children and his wife. Carrión worked with business and community leaders to raise over $200,000 for the two families, including support from the New York Yankees who financed the cost of the funeral and the Soumare family's travel arrangements to Mali. When the incident occurred, Mr. Soumare's application for permanent residency was still pending approval, so Carrión worked with other elected officials to secure permission from immigration officials for Mr. Soumare to return to the United States after burying his family in Mali. The fire was caused by a space heater and touched off a fire safety awareness campaign by Mayor Bloomberg and the New York City Fire Department.

=== Congestion pricing ===
Carrión was the most vocal outer-borough supporter of Mayor Bloomberg's congestion pricing plan which would charge drivers a fee to enter Manhattan between the hours of 8am and 6pm in an effort to reduce congestion and minimize the city's air pollution. On June 15, 2007, Carrión held a press conference with Mayor Bloomberg and nearly a dozen other elected officials from the Bronx to announce their support for the plan, though he stressed that proposed improvements to mass transit would need to be clarified before this plan was implemented.

Carrión's endorsement is significant because it dispelled the myth that politicians with a large percentage of constituents who commute into Manhattan would be intrinsically against the measure.

=== German military training video controversy ===
In April, 2007 a video filmed in June 2006 surfaced on YouTube depicting a German military training exercise in which a German Army instructor orders a recruit to pretend he is in the Bronx and to fire on a van full of African-Americans who are insulting his mother in the worst way. The soldier fires and yells obscenities in English, whereupon he is instructed to yell louder next time. Upon seeing the video, Carrión demanded an apology from the German government and that appropriate action be taken against the offending officer. Carrión, who had just returned from Germany on a tour to promote tourism to the Bronx, offered to return to educate officials about the borough. He also offered to host a contingent of government and military officials to give them a tour of the area. As a result of his remarks, the German Army instructor in the video was relieved of duty and denied retirement benefits. Mayor Andreas Breitner of Rendsburg, the town where the video originated, and German Consul-General Hans-Jurgen Heimsoeth issued formal apologies for the incident.

== City Island ==
The Bronx District Attorney's office investigated some construction work on a piece of property owned by Carrión, in response to a report by the New York Daily News. In 2007, Mr. Carrión had a porch and balcony added to his Victorian home on City Island, Bronx. According to documents obtained by the Daily News from the contractor, Nationwide Maintenance of the Bronx, and from the New York City Department of Buildings, "the project's estimated cost was $50,000. Carrión wound up paying less than half of the estimate – $24,000.

Hugo Subotovsky, the architect for the project, was seeking approval for a Bronx development called Boricua Village and obtained it while working on Carrión's house project. The New York Daily News' reports about the subject suggested that Carrión, as borough president, was instrumental in this approval. The New York Times reported that the project had widespread community support and that though Carrión did recommend the necessary zoning changes after reviewing the project, borough presidents only advise and "cannot kill proposals". Carrión himself claims that his hiring of Subotovsky had nothing to do with the Boricua Village project.

Carrión did not pay Subotovsky for this work until April 2009. Carrión's explanation was that he had not yet requested a final survey of his property and that Subotovsky's "practice was to not bill clients until the permit file at the Buildings Department is complete and closed." Coincidentally, the bill was not paid until the same week the Department of Investigation raided the offices of the Boricua Village project developer, Atlantic Development Group, as part of a bribery and corruption probe. Initially, Carrión had reported that he owed Subotovsky $3,627.50 for 51.5 hours of work. The check he sent the architect was for $4,247.50. As of this writing, there is no information about whether Carrión is still under investigation or not.

== See also ==
- List of U.S. executive branch 'czars'
- Timeline of the Bronx, 21st century
- David Paterson

New York City Council
Preceded by Israel Ruiz Jr.	Member of the New York City Council from the 14th district 1998–2001	Succeeded by Maria Baez
Political offices
Preceded by Fernando Ferrer	Borough President of the Bronx; 2002–2009	Succeeded by Ruben Diaz
