= Fernando Cabrera (politician) =

American politician (born 1964)

Senior Advisor to the New York City Mayor's Office of Faith-Based and Community Partnerships
- In office February 16, 2022 – June 2023

Majority Whip of the New York City Council
- In office January 11, 2018 – December 31, 2021

Member of the New York City Council from the 14th district
- In office January 1, 2010 – December 31, 2021
- Preceded by: Maria Baez
- Succeeded by: Pierina Sanchez

Personal details
- Born: April 16, 1964 (age 62) New York City, U.S.
- Party: Democratic (2008–present)
- Other political affiliations: Republican (before 2008)
- Spouse: Elvia Cabrera
- Children: 2
- Education: Southern California College (BA); Liberty University (MA); Argosy University (EdD)
- Occupation: Pastor, politician

Fernando Cabrera (born April 16, 1964) is an American pastor and politician from the Bronx, New York City. A Democrat, he represented the 14th district in the New York City Council from 2010 to 2021, serving as the council's majority whip in his final term.

Cabrera is the founding senior pastor of New Life Outreach International, a Bronx church, and previously directed the mental health counseling program at Mercy College. He was a registered Republican before changing his affiliation in 2008. After winning the 14th district seat in 2009, he ran unsuccessfully for the New York State Senate in 2014 and 2016 and for Bronx Borough President in 2021, and briefly sought to challenge Representative Alexandria Ocasio-Cortez in 2020. From 2022 to 2023 he was a senior advisor in Mayor Eric Adams's Office of Faith-Based and Community Partnerships, an appointment opposed by LGBT advocacy groups because of his earlier statements on homosexuality. He sought his former council seat again in 2025 and lost the Democratic primary.

Cabrera is a socially conservative Democrat. He is an opponent of abortion and opposes same-sex marriage.

== Early life and education ==
Cabrera was born in the Bronx to a Dominican father and Puerto Rican mother. He was born at Lincoln Hospital in Mott Haven, Bronx and has an identical twin brother, Angelo. When the brothers were four the family moved to Puerto Rico and then to Southern California, in part to relieve Angelo's severe asthma. Cabrera has said that he converted to Christianity at the age of 17. He received a B.A. in Religion from Southern California College, a M.A. in Counseling from Liberty University, and a Doctorate in Education from Argosy University.

== Career ==
=== Ministry and academic career ===
After completing his studies Cabrera directed New Life for Youth, a faith-based drug rehabilitation program in Virginia. He returned to the Bronx in 1988 and founded the church New Life Outreach International, which grew to several locations in the northwest Bronx. He also worked as a counselor at Walton High School and served on a local community board, and by 2000 was head of the counseling program at Mercy College.

Cabrera was a registered but, by his own account, politically inactive Republican until after the 2008 presidential primaries. He changed his registration to Democratic, saying he had been inspired by the candidacy of Barack Obama and had concluded that his values were better aligned with the Democratic Party.

=== New York City Council ===
In 2009, Cabrera challenged Maria Baez in the Democratic primary for the 14th City Council district in the Bronx. He had the support of the Bronx Democratic Committee and key labor unions. He defeated Baez by 1.37% in a three-way race that also included Yudelka Tapia. In November, he won the general election against Republican Yessenia A. Duran and Conservative Lisa Marie Campbell. He won re-election in 2013 by a large margin. The district covers Claremont Village, Fordham, Kingsbridge, Marble Hill, Morris Heights, Mount Eden, Mount Hope and University Heights.

On September 12, 2017, Cabrera won 55% of the vote in the 14th district Democratic primary election, compared to 35% for challenger Randy Abreu and 10% for Felix Perdomo. On January 11, 2018, he was elected Majority Whip and Chairman of the Committee on Governmental Operations. He was term-limited and left the council at the end of 2021, and was succeeded by Pierina Sanchez.

=== Campaigns for other offices ===
In 2014, Cabrera challenged Senator Gustavo Rivera in the Democratic primary but lost 59% to 41%. He challenged Rivera again in 2016 and lost by a larger margin, 63% to 37%.

In 2019, Cabrera announced that he would challenge Representative Alexandria Ocasio-Cortez in the Democratic primary for New York's 14th congressional district, while criticizing her support for democratic socialism. On March 1, 2020, Cabrera announced that he was ending his bid against Ocasio-Cortez and that he would instead run for Bronx borough president in 2021. He lost the nomination to Vanessa Gibson, then chair of the council Committee on Public Safety. The contest was decided by ranked-choice voting; after the final round of tabulation Gibson had 53.5% to Cabrera's 46.5%.

=== Adams administration ===
In February 2022, New York City mayor Eric Adams appointed Cabrera as a senior advisor in the city's Office of Faith-Based and Community Partnerships. LGBT groups criticized the appointment, citing Cabrera's history of opposing same-sex marriage. Cabrera had previously been considered for a senior position related to mental health in the Adams administration. Shortly before the appointment was announced, he publicly apologized for his past remarks, saying that he had been unaware of the treatment of LGBT people by the Ugandan government when he spoke there in 2014 and that he believed "in the rights of all people, regardless of sexual orientation". Adams said that he had heard and accepted the apology.

Cabrera left the position in June 2023. City Hall said he was departing to devote more time to his ministry.

=== 2025 City Council campaign ===
In 2025, Cabrera sought to regain his former City Council seat, challenging his successor, Pierina Sanchez, in the Democratic primary. He campaigned on issues including crime and housing conditions. In the June 24 primary, he finished second with 22% of the vote, behind Sanchez, who received 66%. A third candidate, Bryan Hodge Vasquez, received 10.8%.

== Political positions ==
=== LGBT rights ===
During his first primary bid against Rivera in 2014, Cabrera attracted ire for his opposition to abortion and gay marriage, as well as his apparent praise of a Ugandan anti-gay law. In a video posted to YouTube and later deleted, Cabrera, speaking from Uganda, said, "Gay marriage is not accepted in this country. Why? Because the Christians have assumed the place of decision-making for the nation." In February 2022 he apologized for those remarks.

=== Food and nutrition ===
In 2018, Cabrera and then-Brooklyn Borough President Eric Adams introduced a resolution calling on the New York City Department of Education to ban processed meats from its school meal programs. The resolution was approved in September 2019, shortly after the department implemented a policy banning processed meats.

== Electoral history ==
Election history
Location	Year	Election	Results
NYC Council District 14	2009	Democratic primary	√ Fernando Cabrera 38.53% Maria Baez 37.16% Yudelka Tapia 24.31%
NYC Council District 14	2009	General	√ Fernando Cabrera (D) 87.58% Yessenia A. Duran (R) 10.59% Lisa Marie Campbell (Conservative) 1.83%
NYC Council District 14	2013	Democratic primary	√ Fernando Cabrera 74.83% Israel Martinez 25.18%
NYC Council District 14	2013	General	√ Fernando Cabrera (D) 95.36% Stanley Butler (R) 3.50% Alan H. Reed (Conservative) 1.05%
NY Senate District 33	2014	Democratic primary	√ Gustavo Rivera 59.31% Fernando Cabrera 40.70%
NY Senate District 33	2016	Democratic primary	√ Gustavo Rivera 62.97% Fernando Cabrera 37.93%
NYC Council District 14	2017	Democratic primary	√ Fernando Cabrera 55.06% Randy Abreu 34.69% Felix Perdomo 10.03%
NYC Council District 14	2017	General	√ Fernando Cabrera (D) 83.67% Randy Abreu (Working Families) 10.41% Alan Reed (R) 4.36% Justin Sanchez (Liberal) 1.51%
Bronx Borough President	2021	Democratic primary (final RCV round)	√ Vanessa Gibson 53.5% Fernando Cabrera 46.5%
NYC Council District 14	2025	Democratic primary	√ Pierina Sanchez 66% Fernando Cabrera 22% Bryan Hodge Vasquez 10.8%

== Personal life ==
Cabrera is the senior pastor of New Life Outreach International in the Kingsbridge area of the Bronx. He is a former program director for the Mental Health and Counseling program at Mercy College. He is vegan and adopted a plant-based diet to help manage his heart disease following a cardiac event. He is married to Elvia Cabreraб the couple have two children.

Political offices
Preceded by Maria Baez	Member of the New York City Council from the 14th district 2010–21	Succeeded by Pierina Ana Sanchez
