= Maria Baez =

American politician

Member of the New York City Council from the 14th district
- In office January 2002 – December 2009
- Preceded by: Adolfo Carrión, Jr.
- Succeeded by: Fernando Cabrera
- Constituency: Fordham, Kingsbridge, Morris Heights, West Bronx (14th District — Bronx)

Personal details
- Party: Democratic
- Children: 1
- Education: Monroe College, Lehman College
- Profession: Community organizer; paralegal
- Committees: Aging, State and Federal Legislation

Maria Baez is a Democrat from New York City who was a member of the New York City Council. She was elected to represent Fordham, Kingsbridge, Morris Heights, and the West Bronx, which are all neighborhoods in the 14th district of The Bronx.

== Personal life and early career ==
Her first involvement in politics before her election to the City Council was when she was forming the local community organization, 2300 Tenants Block Association, which helped with voter registration and after-school care for local children. She also worked with Jose Rivera, the Assemblyman as his chief of staff, and later on become the first Hispanic woman to be appointed to head the Bronx Board of Elections.

== Political career and failed 2009 re-election bid ==
Baez was first elected to the New York City Council in the first of January 2002 and was reelected later on. Her term expired on December 31, 2009. On October 23, 2009 Baez voted to extend term limits for the mayor and the City Council. Baez had the support of the Speaker of the New York City Council, Christine Quinn, who said of her: "She's been a great friend to her district, a great friend to the Bronx, and a great and loyal friend to me." The race itself, between Baez, Fernando Cabrera, and Yudelka Tapia has been described by The New York Times as a challenge to the power of local Democratic Party boss Carl Heastie. However Baez was defeated in her re-election bid by 75 votes by Fernando Cabrera, who had only just days before changed his affiliation from Republican to Democrat

=== Committee on Aging ===
She was the first woman to chair the Committee on State and Federal Legislation and after her service there she became the Chair of the Committee on Aging, which administers the public services for aging people throughout New York City.

=== Allegations of pro-landlordism ===
She came under criticism in some sources when she was allegedly accused of supposedly sponsoring a bill that was allegedly "pro-landlord" and, according to some critics, over-funding some programs.

=== Poor attendance record ===
She was also further criticized because of her low attendance record, which according to the records was at 47% attendance rate

=== Allegations of discretionary fund misuse ===
Another issue that unfolded was her use of her discretionary funds for groups that the City Council had previously refused to fund. Some of the money that Baez conferred has been frozen pending an inquiry by the New York City Department of Investigation.

Preceded by Adolfo Carrión, Jr.	New York City Council, 14th district 2002–2009	Succeeded by Fernando Cabrera
