= Pierina Sanchez =

American politician (born 1988)

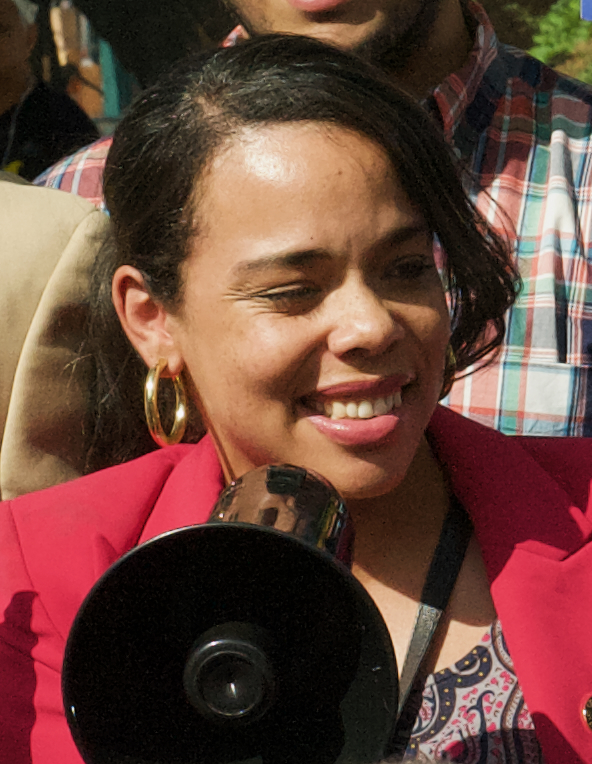
- Sanchez in 2024

Member of the New York City Council from the 14th district
- Incumbent
- Assumed office January 1, 2022
- Preceded by: Fernando Cabrera

Personal details
- Born: Pierina Ana Sanchez; June 10, 1988 (age 38) University Heights, New York, U.S.
- Party: Democratic
- Education: Harvard University (BA); Princeton University (MPA)
- Website: Official website

Pierina Ana Sanchez (born June 10, 1988) is an American politician from the Bronx, New York City. Since 2022, Sanchez has represented the 14th district on the New York City Council, encompassing Kingsbridge, Fordham, University Heights, and Tremont. A Democrat, Sanchez formerly served in the mayoral office of Bill de Blasio as a policy advisor.

== Early life and education ==
Sanchez was born in University Heights, Bronx and grew up in the Kingsbridge neighborhood of the Bronx. She is the daughter of Mixed-race Dominican immigrants who immigrated to the United States in the 1970s. She has a son, born in August of 2022.

After enrolling in the Upward Bound college-preparatory program provided by Bronx Community College, Sanchez attended Harvard University. She later received a Master's in Public Affairs (M.P.A.) degree from Princeton University's School of Public and International Affairs.

== Career ==
While at Harvard, Sanchez worked for an immigration non-profit organization and tutored incarcerated GED students. After receiving her undergraduate degree, she worked in constituency services for councilman Fernando Cabrera. While at Princeton, Sanchez interned at the White House in the summer of 2012 during the presidency of Barack Obama.

In 2015, Sanchez was elected to serve on the board of the Bronx Young Democrats. She also worked under Mayor of New York Bill de Blasio as senior advisor for housing, economic development and labor.

=== New York City Council ===
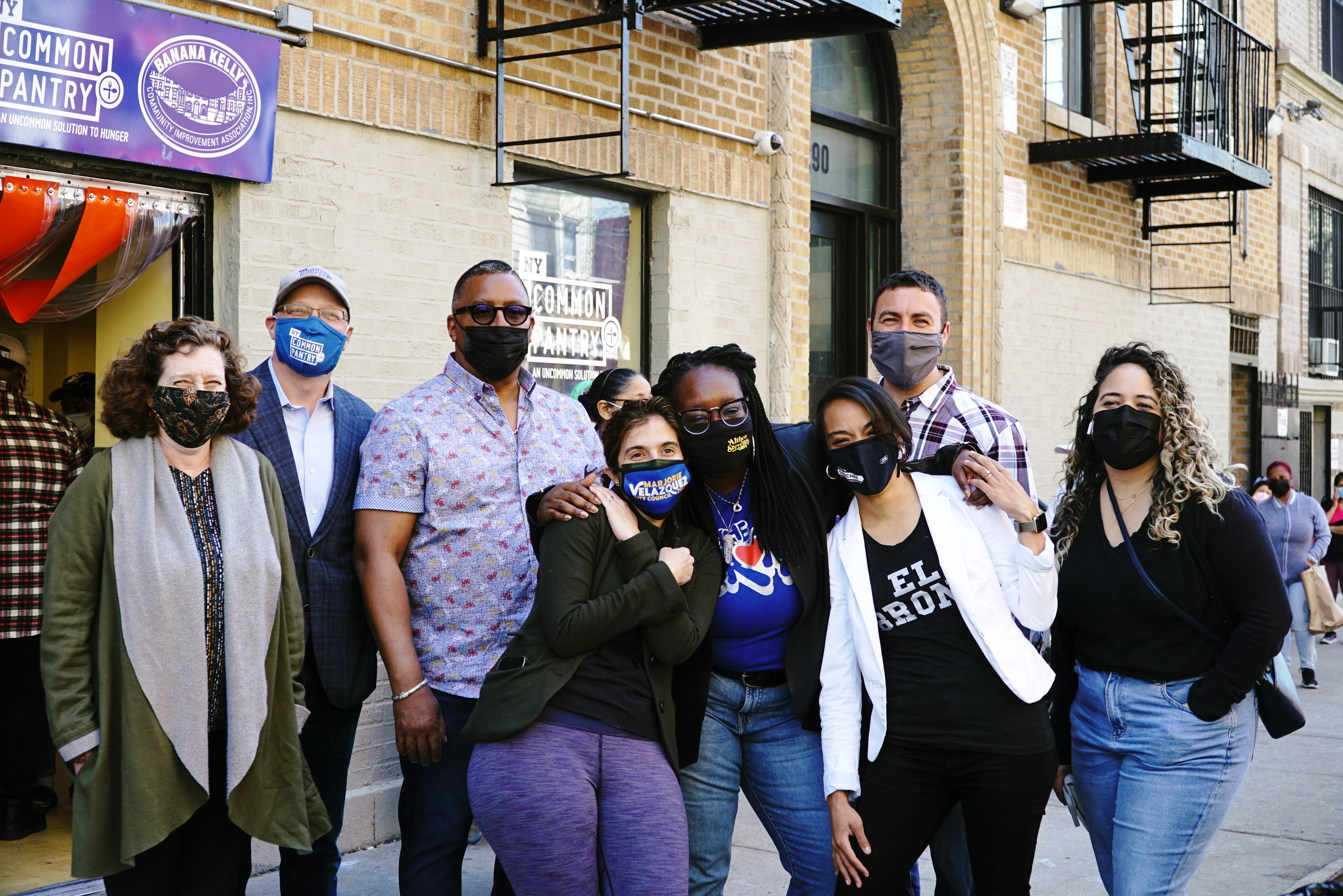
Sanchez (third from right) with Bronx Democrats in early 2021

In the 2021 New York City Council election, Sanchez ran to replace Cabrera, her former boss. Sanchez's campaign received the support of the Retail, Wholesale and Department Store Union (RWDSU) and the New York City Central Labor Council.

As a candidate, Sanchez advocated for universal after-school programs for college preparation and vocational training, and endorsed the creation of more worker cooperatives. On housing, Sanchez endorsed the creation of a right to counsel, rent cancellation, and direct funding for repairing New York City Housing Authority (NYCHA) units. Sanchez endorsed the defund the police movement in 2020.

In the final count, Sanchez received 62.4 percent of the vote in the Democratic primary against runner-up Yudelka Tapia, who received 37.6 percent. Sanchez won the general election against Republican opponent Shemeen Chappell. As of 2024, she serves as the City Council's chair of the housing and buildings committee.

== Electoral history ==
=== 2025 ===
2025 New York City Council Democratic primary, District 14
Party	Candidate	Votes	%
Democratic	Pierina Sanchez (incumbent)	6,723	66.4
Democratic	Fernando Cabrera	2,245	22.2
Democratic	Bryan Hodge Vasquez	1,114	11.0
Write-in		48	0.5
Total votes		10,130	100.0

2025 New York City Council election, District 14
Party	Candidate	Votes	%
Democratic	Pierina Sanchez	14,765	85.6
Working Families	Pierina Sanchez	2,350	13.6
Total	Pierina Sanchez (incumbent)	17,115	99.2
Write-in		133	0.8
Total votes		17,248	100.0
Democratic hold			

=== 2023 ===
2023 New York City Council Democratic primary, District 14
Party	Candidate	Votes	%
Democratic	Pierina Sanchez (incumbent)	2,452	76.2
Democratic	Rachel T. Miller-Bradshaw	748	23.3
Write-in		17	0.5
Total votes		3,217	100.0

2023 New York City Council election, District 14
Party	Candidate	Votes	%
Democratic	Pierina Sanchez	3,674	81.8
Working Families	Pierina Sanchez	286	6.4
Total	Pierina Sanchez (incumbent)	3,960	88.2
Republican	Amelia Rose	490	10.9
Write-in		42	0.9
Total votes		4,492	100.0
Democratic hold			

=== 2021 ===
2021 New York City Council Democratic primary, District 14
Party	Candidate	Maximum round	Maximum votes	Share in maximum round	Maximum votes First round votes Transfer votes
Democratic	Pierina Sanchez	6	4,887	62.3%	
Democratic	Yudelka Tapia	6	2,957	37.7%	
Democratic	Adolfo Abreu	5	2,105	24.5%	
Democratic	Haile Rivera	4	1,102	12.3%	
Democratic	Fernando A. Aquino	3	939	10.1%	
Democratic	Socrates S. Solano	2	175	1.9%	
Write-In		1	30	0.3%	

2021 New York City Council election, District 14
Party	Candidate	Votes	%
Democratic	Pierina Sanchez	8,387	88.8
Republican	Shemeen Chappell	1,044	11.0
Write-in		19	0.2
Total votes		9,450	100.0
Democratic hold			

Political offices
Preceded by Maria Baez	Member of the New York City Council from the 14th district 2022–present	Incumbent
