= Luis Diaz (politician) =

Puerto Rican politician

Luis M. Diaz

Member of the New York State Assembly from the 86th district
- In office 2003–2008
- Succeeded by: Nelson Castro

Personal details
- Born: 1952 or 1953 (age 73–74) Aguadilla, Puerto Rico
- Party: Democratic
- Children: 5
- Education: SUNY Old Westbury (BA)
- Occupation: politician

Luis M. Diaz is a former New York State Assembly member for the 86th district, first elected in 2002 when the Bronx district was created. In 2008, he stepped down as assemblyman to take a community affairs position in the administration of Governor David A. Paterson. Diaz was appointed Bronx County Clerk for the New York State Supreme Court in 2009. He was suspended in 2020 and resigned in 2022, when he pleaded guilty for falsely certifying that an organized-crime defendant had completed his court-mandated community service from a previous sentence.

Diaz was born in Aguadilla, Puerto Rico. He moved to the Bronx as a child, attended public schools, and received a B.A. in political science from SUNY Old Westbury. Prior to his election, he served as executive director of Neighborhood Enhancement Training and Services, a nonprofit social service organization in the Bronx. He has five children.

New York State Assembly
Preceded by Richard Brodsky	New York State Assembly, 86th District; 2003–2008	Succeeded by Nelson Castro
