= Victor M. Pichardo =

American politician (born 1984)

Member of the New York State Assembly from the 86th district
- In office January 1, 2014 – September 10, 2021
- Preceded by: Nelson Castro
- Succeeded by: Yudelka Tapia

Personal details
- Born: August 27, 1984 (age 42) New York, New York, U.S.
- Party: Democratic
- Other political affiliations: Working Families Party
- Education: University at Buffalo
- Committees: Cities, Higher Education, Housing, Real Property Taxation, Small Business, Social Services
- Website: Assembly website

Victor M. Pichardo (born August 27, 1984) is a former Democratic member of the New York State Assembly representing 86th New York State Assembly District, which includes the university and Morris Heights, Mount Eden, Kingsbridge, Tremont, and Fordham sections of the Bronx.

== Early life and career ==
He attended the State University of New York at Buffalo where he earned a Bachelor of Arts degree in communications.

Pichardo went on to work for U.S. Senator Chuck Schumer as a staff assistant and was eventually promoted to Community Outreach Coordinator. During his time with Senator Schumer, Pichardo worked on such important issues such as Comprehensive Immigration Reform, the DREAM Act and the Affordable Care Act.

After serving for 4 years in Senator Schumer's office, Pichardo became an associate director of Public Relations at Mercy College. In 2012, Pichardo left Mercy to join New York State Senator Gustavo Rivera's staff as Director of Community Affairs.

== Political career ==
Pichardo was elected to the New York State Assembly in a November 2013 special election. In the special election, Pichardo was endorsed by U.S. Senator Chuck Schumer, State Senator Gustavo Rivera, and then-Bronx Democratic Party Chairman Carl Heastie.

In 2014, Pichardo was re-elected to a full term in the New York State Assembly with 95 percent of the vote. He defeated challengers Rene Santos and Jose Marte.

In 2016, Pichardo was re-elected to a full term in the New York State Assembly with the highest percentage of the vote.

In August 2021, Victor Pichardo announced that he will quit being a member of the New York State Assembly after serving 8 years (4 terms) representing his assembly district in the Bronx before the redistricting process begins. He cited a need to spend more time with his wife and two children.

Political offices
New York State Assembly
Preceded by Nelson Castro	New York State Assembly, 86th District; January 1, 2014 – August 30, 2021	Succeeded by Yudelka Tapia
