= Episcopal Church of the Mediator (Bronx) =

Episcopal church in the Bronx, New York

Church of the Mediator
- Episcopal Church of the Mediator
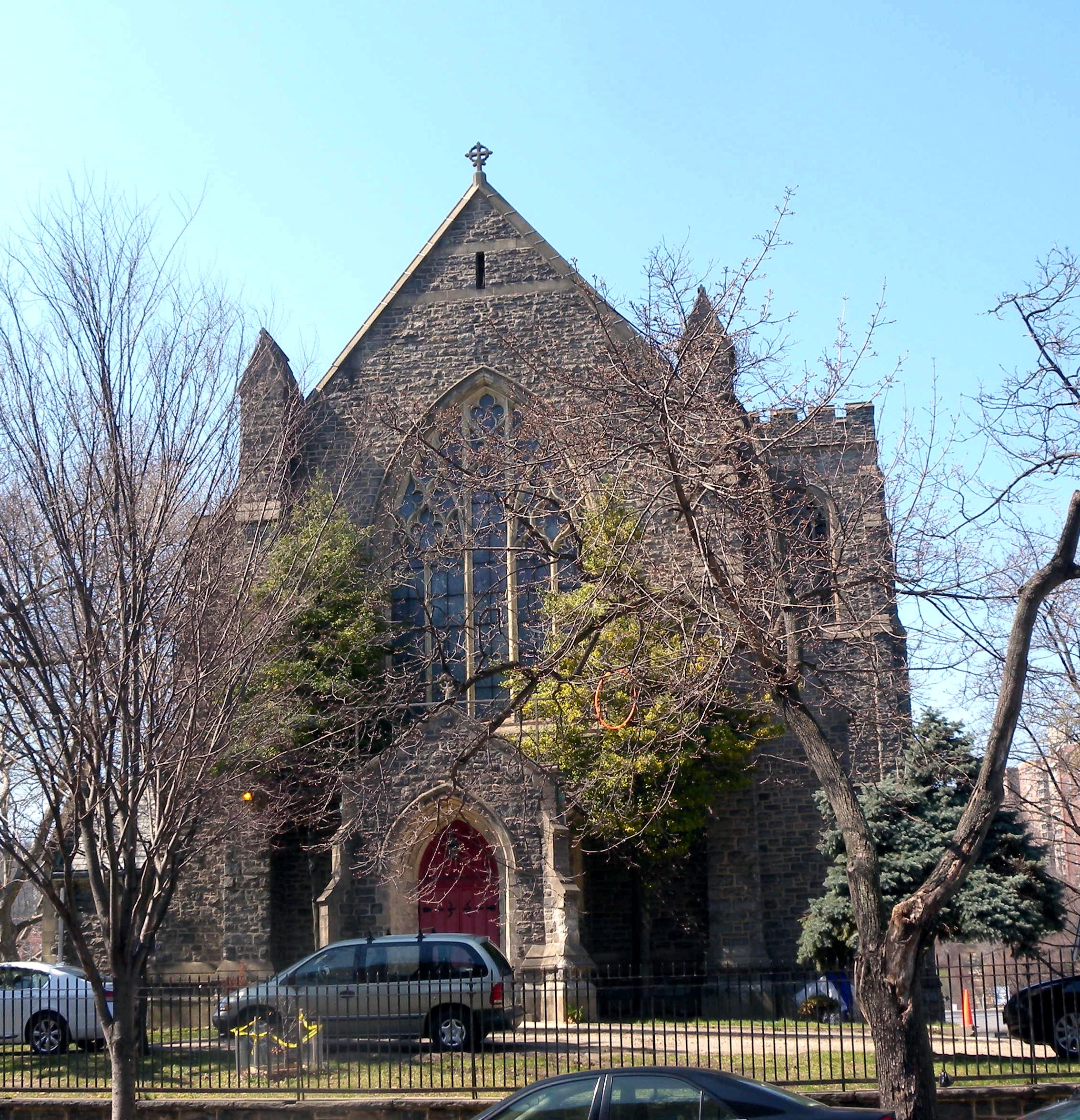
- View from Kingsbridge Avenue
- Church of the Mediator
- 40°52′47.15″N 73°54′26.29″W
- Location: 260 West 231st Street; Kingsbridge, The Bronx, New York City
- Country: United States
- Language(s): American English; Spanish
- Denomination: Episcopal
- Website: churchofthemediator.org

History
- Founded: 15 August 1855; 171 years ago
- Consecrated: 23 January 1927; 99 years ago

Architecture
- Functional status: Active
- Architect: Henry Vaughan
- Style: Neo-Gothic
- Years built: 1906-1913

Administration
- Province: International Atlantic Province (Province 2)
- Diocese: Episcopal Diocese of New York
original 1857 building
- Episcopal Church of the Mediator
- original 1857 building
- Denomination: Episcopal
History
- Consecrated: 6 November 1864
Architecture
- Completed: 1857
- Construction cost: $5,500
- Demolished: 1908

The Episcopal Church of the Mediator is an Episcopal parish church in the Kingsbridge section of The Bronx, New York, designed by Henry Vaughan (architect), architect of the Washington National Cathedral and chapels of the Cathedral of Saint John the Divine, New York. It features Tiffany windows and George Tinworth's terracottas friezes, along with a notable window in the narthex over the entry featuring Jane Addams and Booker T. Washington.

The church reported 314 members in 2015 and 91 members in 2025. Plate and pledge income reported for the congregation in 2024 was $0.00 with average Sunday attendance (ASA) of zero persons.

The parish was formed on August 15, 1855, as The Church of the Mediator, Yonkers. Two years later, the first church for the parish was constructed at the cost of $5,000. The church was consecrated by Bishop Horatio Potter on November 6, 1864.

In 1902, the parish opted to create a new church. Henry Vaughan, the architect who designed the Washington National Cathedral, designed the church in a neo-Gothic style. The cornerstone bears the date 1911. This church was consecrated in 1927 by Bishop William Thomas Manning, who called it "the little cathedral of the Bronx" in reference to its size, design, and architectural details.

The church incorporates Tiffany favrile glass windows, including an unusual variant on the "Jesus Blessing the Little Children" Tiffany Studios design by artist Frederick Wilson, two large terra-cotta panels by George Tinworth, and a massive narthex window featuring figures of Jane Addams and Booker T. Washington. The church also features a Skinner organ.

The Episcopal Church of the Mediator is home to the Corlear Sycamore, also known as the Sister Tree, which is considered to be among the oldest and largest trees in The Bronx. The property currently hosts the Kingsbridge community refrigerator and environmental ministry, and houses several community outreach programs.

By 2025, the church had fallen into a state of disrepair and was threatened with demolition. It was included in the 2025 Preservation League of New York State's "Seven to Save" list.
