= White House Office of Urban Affairs =

Part of the Executive Office of the President of the United States

Agency overview
- Formed: February 19, 2009; 17 years ago
- Dissolved: January 20, 2017; 9 years ago (ceased operating)
- Website: obamawhitehouse.archives.gov/administration/eop/oua

The White House Office of Urban Affairs is an office within the White House Office, part of the Executive Office of the President of the United States.

== History ==
The Office was established under Executive Order 13503, issued by President Barack Obama on February 19, 2009. It is headed by a director, who is assisted by a deputy director. The director was charged with reporting jointly to the Assistant to the President for Intergovernmental Affairs and Public Liaison and to the Assistant to the President for Domestic Policy. The first director was Adolfo Carrión Jr. On May 3, 2010, Carrión departed the post, and deputy director Derek Douglas became acting director, though Carrión was never formally replaced. Douglas departed the position at the end of 2011 and was also never formally replaced.

The Office lacked regulatory authority or observable influence, and has not been used since the 2017 inauguration of Donald Trump.

== Mission ==
The purpose of the office is to provide leadership for and coordinate the development of the policy agenda for urban America across executive departments and agencies and with this also to coordinate all aspects of urban policy with all executive departments and agencies to ensure that any policy developed has been examined for its impact on urban affairs. The office also works to ensure that federal government dollars targeted to urban areas are effectively spent on the highest-impact programs; and to engage in outreach and work closely with state and local officials, with nonprofit organizations, and with the private sector, both in seeking input regarding the development of a comprehensive urban policy and in ensuring that the implementation of federal programs advances the objectives of that policy.
