= Nelson Castro (politician) =

American politician (born 1972)

Member of the New York State Assembly from the 86th district
- In office 2009–2013
- Preceded by: Luis Diaz
- Succeeded by: Victor M. Pichardo

Personal details
- Party: Democratic
- Occupation: Politician

Nelson Castro is an American politician from the state of New York. A Democrat, he was first elected to the New York State Assembly in District 86 in 2008.

Castro resigned from office in 2013, after pleading guilty to perjury charges. He is notable for having worn a wire as an FBI informant while serving in elected office; in so doing, he assisted the federal government in prosecuting another politician.

== Early life ==
In 2004, Castro was charged with grand larceny because he collected $5,000 in unemployment checks while in fact he had a job. He pled guilty to petit larceny, and was sentenced to three years’ probation and ordered to pay the money back.

He was arrested in 2008, because he drove a car with a revoked driver license. Castro said that it had been revoked because he failed to pay fines for moving violations, and because he drove a car that was uninsured.

== Political career ==
In 2008, Castro was first elected to the New York State Assembly in District 86; the district included the University Heights, Tremont, and Fordham sections of the Bronx. He succeeded Luis Diaz and became the first Dominican to represent the Bronx in the New York State Assembly. Castro resigned his Assembly seat on April 8, 2013.

=== Legal troubles and work as an FBI informant ===
In July 2009, the Bronx County District Attorney charged Castro with perjury. The charges were kept secret, and Castro agreed to cooperate with the Bronx County District Attorney and later with the FBI. Castro proceeded to win re-election in 2010 and 2012, but was living a "double life" as an FBI informant during that time. Information obtained by Castro was used to prosecute his fellow assemblymember, Eric Stevenson.

In 2013, Castro's role as an FBI informant became public knowledge during a scandal affecting Stevenson.

== Criminal convictions ==
Castro later pleaded guilty to the 2009 state charges and the 2013 federal charge against him. In September 2014, Castro received a sentence of two years' probation and 500 hours of community service for his federal crimes. On November 17, 2014, Castro was given a three-year conditional discharge for his state crimes.

New York State Assembly
Preceded by Luis Diaz	New York State Assembly, 86th District; 2009–2013	Succeeded by Victor M. Pichardo
