= Yudelka Tapia =

American politician

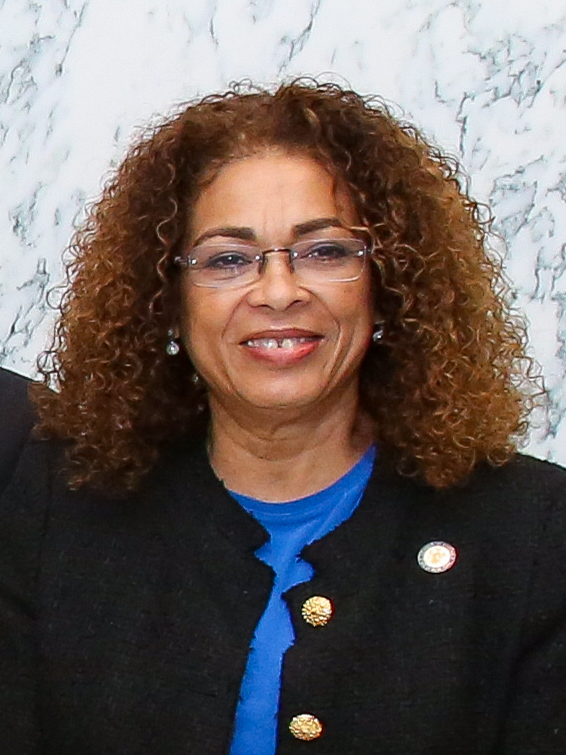

Member of the New York State Assembly from the 86th district
- Incumbent
- Assumed office November 2, 2021
- Preceded by: Victor M. Pichardo

Personal details
- Born: Santo Domingo, Dominican Republic
- Party: Democratic
- Education: Organization and Method College (BA); Bronx Community College; Hunter College (MA)
- Website: State Assembly website

Yudelka Tapia is an American politician who is currently representing the 86th district in the New York State Assembly since 2021.

== Early life and education ==
Tapia was born in Santo Domingo, Dominican Republic. Raised in what she described as "a family of organizers", Tapia described her father as "a revolutionary" who "fought in the civil war against the invasion of the Yankees in 1965."

Tapia became involved in social activism at O&M College, where she founded and led the Unión Democrática de Mujeres as the group's president. She immigrated to the United States at age 19, settling in the West Bronx, and attended Bronx Community College in the 1990s. Tapia later earned a master's degree in urban policy and leadership from Hunter College.

== Career ==
Tapia worked as an auditor for the City of New York for 23 years. She served as a local Democratic district leader and as president of the parent teacher association at Theodore Roosevelt High School.

In the 2021 New York City Council election, Tapia unsuccessfully ran to represent the 14th district, losing to Pierina Sanchez.

Following assemblyman Victor Pichardo's resignation announcement, Tapia announced her candidacy to replace him. Tapia was nominated as the candidate of the Democratic Party and won the special election to succeed Pichardo. Tapia endorsed Kathy Hochul's campaign in the 2022 gubernatorial election. Tapia endorsed former governor Andrew Cuomo's failed campaign for Democratic nominee in the 2025 New York City Democratic primary for mayor. After Assemblyman Zohran Mamdani defeated Cuomo and became the Democratic nominee, Tapia declined to endorse him and continued to support Cuomo's third-party run for mayor, breaking with the Bronx Democratic Party, who endorsed Mamdani.

== Personal life ==
Tapia is the mother of four children.
