= Hudson Line =

Hudson Line refers to the following rail lines, all originally part of the Hudson River Railroad following the east shore of the Hudson River

- Hudson Line (Metro-North), a commuter line from New York City north to Poughkeepsie
- Hudson Subdivision a rail line continuing north from Poughkeepsie to Rensselaer, owned by CSX and leased by Amtrak
- West Side Line in New York City, now owned by Amtrak from New York Penn Station north to Spuyten Duyvil
  - High Line, the abandoned West Side Line south of Penn Station, now an elevated park

== See also ==
- Vaudreuil–Hudson line out of Montreal
- West Shore Railroad, a former New York Central rail line from Weehawken, New Jersey, to Albany, New York, along the west shore of the Hudson River

- River Subdivision (CSX Transportation), the current rail line following the West Shore alignment
