= New York City's 14th City Council district =

- Boundaries following the 2020 census

Government
  - Councilmember: Pierina Sanchez (D—Kingsbridge)

Population (2010)
  - Total: 158,876

Demographics
  - Hispanic: 72%
  - Black: 21%
  - Asian: 3%
  - White: 3%
  - Other: 2%

Registration
  - Democratic: 76.4%
  - Republican: 4.7%
  - No party preference: 16.4%
- Registered voters (2021) 94,515

New York City's 14th City Council district is one of 51 districts in the New York City Council. It is currently represented by Democrat Pierina Sanchez, who took office in 2022.

== Geography ==
District 14 covers a stretch of the West Bronx along the Harlem River, including the neighborhoods of University Heights, Fordham, Morris Heights, and Kingsbridge.

The district overlaps with Bronx Community Boards 4, 5, 7 and 8, and with New York's 13th and 15th congressional districts. It also overlaps with the 29th and 33rd districts of the New York State Senate, and with the 77th, 78th, 81st, and 86th districts of the New York State Assembly.

== Recent election results ==
=== 2025 ===
The 2025 New York City Council elections will be held on November 4, 2025, with primary elections occurring on June 24, 2025.

2025 New York City Council election, District 14
Primary election
Party	Candidate	Votes	%
Democratic	Pierina Sanchez (incumbent)	6,723	66.4
Democratic	Fernando Cabrera	2,245	22.2
Democratic	Bryan Vasquez	1,114	11.0
Write-in		119	0.5
Total votes		10,201	100
General election
Democratic	Pierina Sanchez	14,765	
Working Families	Pierina Sanchez	2,350	
Total	Pierina Sanchez (incumbent)	17,115	99.2
Write-in		133	0.8
Total votes		17,248	100.0
Democratic hold			

=== 2023 (redistricting) ===
Due to redistricting and the 2020 changes to the New York City Charter, councilmembers elected during the 2021 and 2023 City Council elections will serve two-year terms, with full four-year terms resuming after the 2025 New York City Council elections.

2023 New York City Council election, District 14
Primary election
Party	Candidate	Votes	%
Democratic	Pierina Sanchez (incumbent)	2,452	76.2
Democratic	Rachel Miller-Bradshaw	748	23.3
Write-in		17	0.5
Total votes		3,217	100.0
General election
Democratic	Pierina Sanchez	3,674	
Working Families	Pierina Sanchez	286	
Total	Pierina Sanchez (incumbent)	3,960	88.2
Republican	Amelia Rose	490	10.9
Write-in		42	0.9
Total votes		4,492	100
Democratic hold			

=== 2021 ===
In 2019, voters in New York City approved Ballot Question 1, which implemented ranked-choice voting in all local elections. Under the new system, voters have the option to rank up to five candidates for every local office. Voters whose first-choice candidates fare poorly will have their votes redistributed to other candidates in their ranking until one candidate surpasses the 50 percent threshold. If one candidate surpasses 50 percent in first-choice votes, then ranked-choice tabulations will not occur.

2021 New York City Council election, District 14 Democratic primary
Party	Candidate	Maximum round	Maximum votes	Share in maximum round	Maximum votes First round votes Transfer votes
Democratic	Pierina Sanchez	6	4,887	62.3%	
Democratic	Yudelka Tapia	6	2,957	37.7%	
Democratic	Adolfo Abreu	5	2,105	24.5%	
Democratic	Haile Rivera	4	1,102	12.3%	
Democratic	Fernando Aquino	3	939	10.1%	
Democratic	Socrates Solano	2	175	1.9%	
Write-in		1	30	0.3%	

An interactive map of District 14

2021 New York City Council election, District 14 general election
Party	Candidate	Votes	%
Democratic	Pierina Sanchez	8,387	88.8
Republican	Shemeen Chappell	1,044	11.0
Write-in		17	0.2
Total votes		9,448	100
Democratic hold			

=== 2017 ===
2017 New York City Council election, District 14
Primary election
Party	Candidate	Votes	%
Democratic	Fernando Cabrera (incumbent)	3,898	55.1
Democratic	Randy Abreu	2,456	34.7
Democratic	Felix Perdomo	710	10.0
Write-in		16	0.2
Total votes		7,080	100
General election
Democratic	Fernando Cabrera (incumbent)	9,826	83.7
Working Families	Randy Abreu	1,222	10.4
Republican	Alan Reed	411	
Conservative	Alan Reed	101	
Total	Alan Reed	512	4.4
Liberal	Justin Sanchez	177	1.5
Write-in		7	0.1
Total votes		11,744	100
Democratic hold			

=== 2013 ===
2013 New York City Council election, District 14
Primary election
Party	Candidate	Votes	%
Democratic	Fernando Cabrera (incumbent)	4,479	74.7
Democratic	Israel Martinez	1,507	25.2
Write-in		6	0.1
Total votes		5,992	100
General election
Democratic	Fernando Cabrera	10,111	
Working Families	Fernando Cabrera	280	
Total	Fernando Cabrera	10,391	95.4
Republican	Denise Butler	381	3.5
Conservative	Alan Reed	114	1.0
Write-in		11	0.2
Total votes		10,897	100
Democratic hold			
