= New York's 33rd State Senate district =

American legislative district

Senator
Gustavo Rivera; D–University Heights, Bronx
- Registration: 78.1% Democratic; 4.3% Republican; 15.0% No party preference
- Demographics: 4% White; 23% Black; 69% Hispanic; 2% Asian
- Population (2017): 332,109
- Registered voters: 169,523

New York's 33rd State Senate district is one of 63 districts in the New York State Senate. It has been represented by Democrat Gustavo Rivera since 2011, following his victory over incumbent Pedro Espada Jr. in the 2010 Democratic primary elections.

== Geography ==
District 33 covers many neighborhoods in the central and south Bronx, including Kingsbridge Heights, Tremont, East Tremont, Crotona, Fordham, Belmont, Van Nest, and Morris Park.

The district overlaps with New York's 13th, 14th, and 15th congressional districts, and with the 77th, 78th, 79th, 80th, 81st, 86th, and 87th districts of the New York State Assembly.

== Recent election results ==
=== 2026 ===
2026 New York State Senate election, District 33
Party	Candidate	Votes	%
Democratic	Gustavo Rivera		
Working Families	Gustavo Rivera		
Total	Gustavo Rivera (incumbent)		
Write-in			
Total votes			100.0

=== 2024 ===
2024 New York State Senate election, District 33
Party	Candidate	Votes	%
Democratic	Gustavo Rivera	47,793	
Working Families	Gustavo Rivera	3,842	
Total	Gustavo Rivera (incumbent)	51,635	74.7
Republican	Dion Powell	15,868	
Conservative	Dion Powell	1,435	
Total	Dion Powell	17,303	25.0
Write-in		194	0.3
Total votes		69,132	100.0
Democratic hold			

=== 2022 ===
2022 New York State Senate election, District 33
Primary election
Party	Candidate	Votes	%
Democratic	Gustavo Rivera (incumbent)	6,095	51.9
Democratic	Miguelina Camilo	5,589	47.6
Write-in		63	0.5
Total votes		11,747	100.0
General election
Democratic	Gustavo Rivera	30,136	
Working Families	Gustavo Rivera	2,884	
Total	Gustavo Rivera (incumbent)	33,020	99.5
Write-in		163	0.7
Total votes		33,183	100.0
Democratic hold			

=== 2020 ===
2020 New York State Senate election, District 33
Party	Candidate	Votes	%
Democratic	Gustavo Rivera	63,207	
Working Families	Gustavo Rivera	4,061	
Total	Gustavo Rivera (incumbent)	67,268	87.9
Republican	Dustin Martinez	8,288	10.8
Conservative	Steven Stern	890	1.2
Write-in		62	0.1
Total votes		76,508	100.0
Democratic hold			

=== 2018 ===
2018 New York State Senate election, District 33
Party	Candidate	Votes	%
Democratic	Gustavo Rivera	45,627	
Working Families	Gustavo Rivera	906	
Total	Gustavo Rivera (incumbent)	46,533	95.0
Republican	Nicole Torres	2,099	4.3
Conservative	Steven Stern	302	0.6
Write-in		23	0.1
Total votes		48,957	100.0
Democratic hold			

=== 2016 ===
2016 New York State Senate election, District 33
Primary election
Party	Candidate	Votes	%
Democratic	Gustavo Rivera (incumbent)	6,036	62.7
Democratic	Fernando Cabrera	3,549	36.9
Write-in		37	0.4
Total votes		9,622	100.0
General election
Democratic	Gustavo Rivera	60,230	
Working Families	Gustavo Rivera	1,723	
Total	Gustavo Rivera (incumbent)	61,953	97.8
Conservative	Steven Stern	1,340	2.1
Write-in		52	0.1
Total votes		63,345	100.0
Democratic hold			

=== 2014 ===
2014 New York State Senate election, District 33
Primary election
Party	Candidate	Votes	%
Democratic	Gustavo Rivera (incumbent)	5,516	58.9
Democratic	Fernando Cabrera	3,785	40.4
Write-in		62	0.7
Total votes		9,363	100.0
General election
Democratic	Gustavo Rivera	19,128	
Working Families	Gustavo Rivera	681	
Total	Gustavo Rivera (incumbent)	19,809	93.0
Republican	Steven Stern	940	
Conservative	Steven Stern	186	
Total	Steven Stern	1,126	5.3
Independence	Jose Padilla Jr.	342	1.6
Write-in		24	0.1
Total votes		21,301	100.0
Democratic hold			

=== 2012 ===
2012 New York State Senate election, District 33
Primary election
Party	Candidate	Votes	%
Democratic	Gustavo Rivera (incumbent)	4,988	69.2
Democratic	Manuel Tavarez	2,193	30.4
Write-in		26	0.4
Total votes		7,207	100.0
General election
Democratic	Gustavo Rivera	56,222	
Working Families	Gustavo Rivera	945	
Total	Gustavo Rivera (incumbent)	57,167	96.1
Republican	Michael Walters	1,884	
Conservative	Michael Walters	412	
Total	Michael Walters	2,296	3.9
Write-in		15	0.0
Total votes		59,478	100.0
Democratic hold			

=== Federal results in District 33 ===
Year	Office	Results
2020	President	Biden 84.1 – 15.1%
2016	President	Clinton 93.1 – 5.5%
2012	President	Obama 95.9 – 3.8%
2012	Senate	Gillibrand 96.2 – 3.3%
