= Kingsbridge, Bronx =

Neighborhood in New York City

Kingsbridge
- Neighborhood of the Bronx
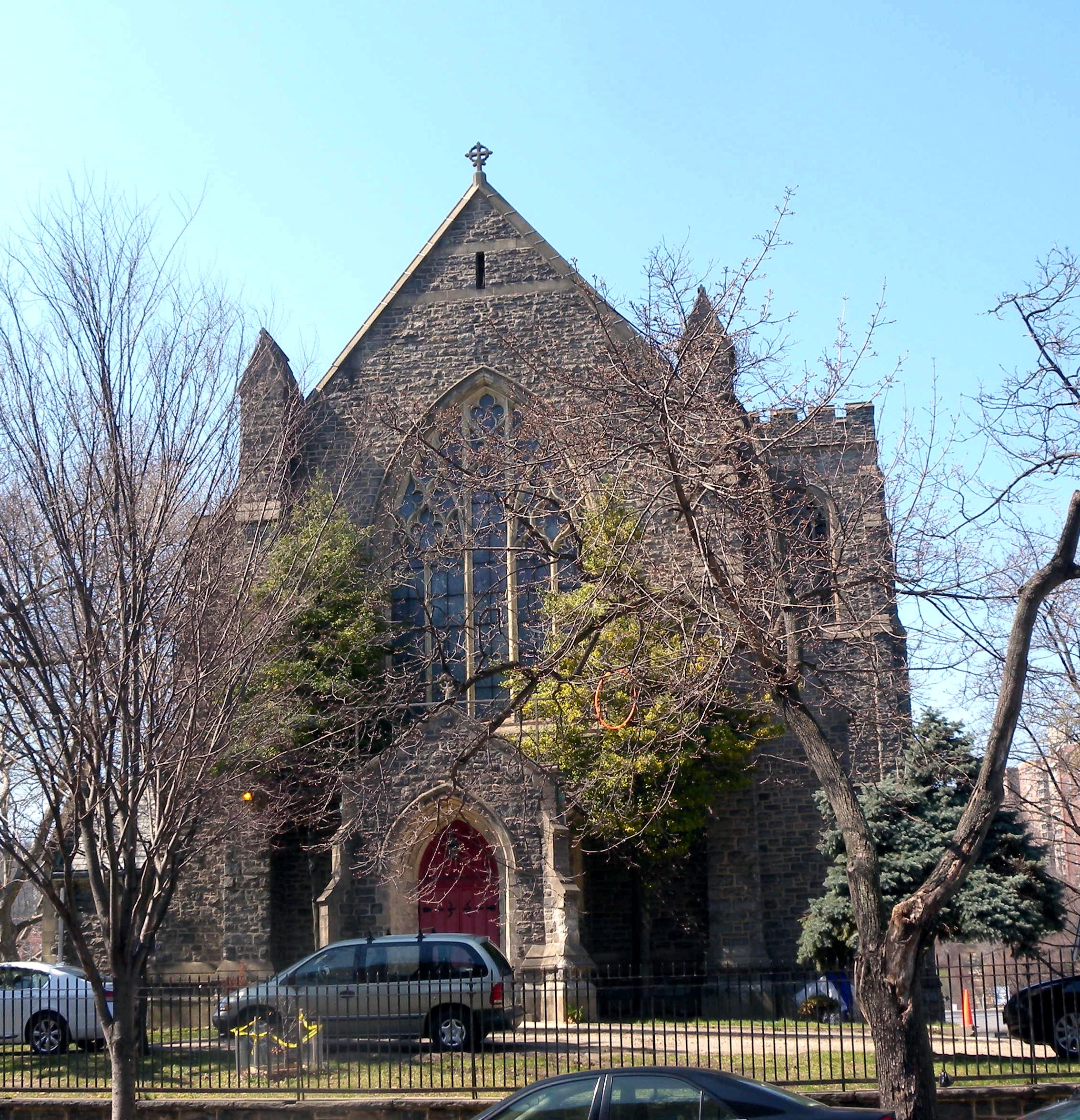
- Looking west across Kingsbridge Avenue at Episcopal Church of the Mediator
- Interactive map of Kingsbridge
- Coordinates: 40.879°N 73.905°W
- Country: United States
- State: New York
- City: New York City
- Borough: The Bronx
- Community District: The Bronx 8

Area
  - Total: 0.310 sq mi (0.80 km^{2})

Population (2011)
  - Total: 10,669
  - Density: 34,400/sq mi (13,300/km^{2})

Economics
  - Median income: $53,875
- ZIP Codes: 10463
- Area code: 718, 347, 929, and 917

Kingsbridge is a residential neighborhood in the northwest portion of the Bronx, New York City. Kingsbridge's boundaries are Manhattan College Parkway to the north, the Major Deegan Expressway or Bailey Avenue to the east, West 230th Street to the south, and Irwin Avenue to the west.

The neighborhood is part of Bronx Community Board 8, and its ZIP Code is 10463. Kingsbridge is patrolled by the New York City Police Department's 50th Precinct.

== Land use and terrain ==
Kingsbridge has detached, semi detached, and attached homes, and apartment buildings. Streets connecting Riverdale and Kingsbridge include "step streets", with stairways of as many as 160 steps climbing the slope. The neighborhood is also part of a business improvement district that is home to 200 merchants, and is one of the largest retail shopping districts in the Bronx. River Plaza Shopping Center is located nearby (in the Marble Hill neighborhood of Manhattan), but it is not part of the business improvement district. During the past several years there have been significant improvements in the infrastructure of the community. For example, the parks have been improved significantly and there are new elementary schools on 230th Street.

On 233rd Street and Bailey Avenue, there is a baseball field that is run by Kingsbridge Little League. The field has lights, dugouts, stands, and a small food court.

== History ==
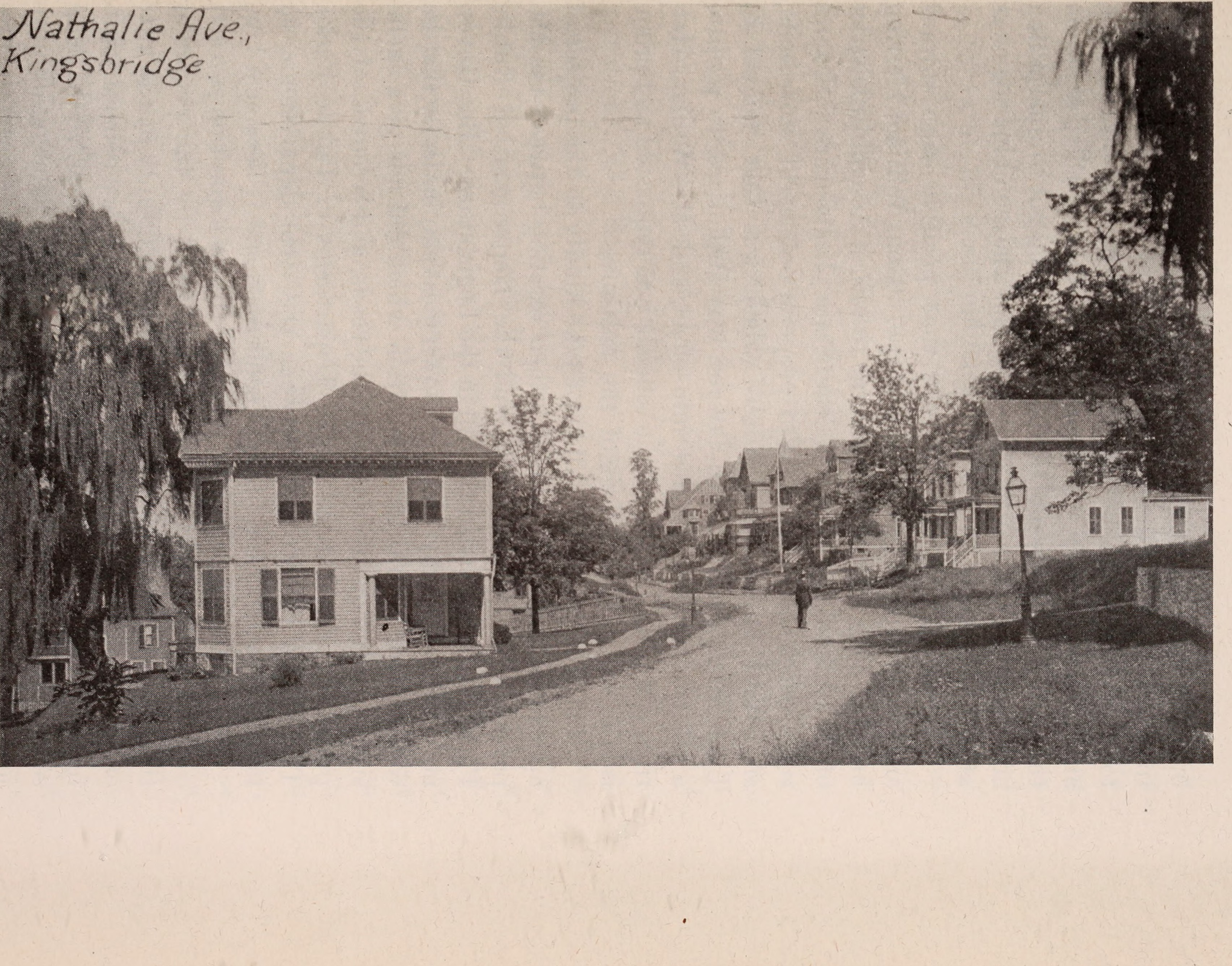
Nathalie Avenue in 1897, now called Kingsbridge Terrace

The neighborhood is named for the King's Bridge, likely erected by enslaved Africans in 1693 and owned by Frederick Philipse, lord of Philipsburg Manor, which encompassed parts of present-day Bronx and much of Westchester County. The bridge spanned a now-filled-in section of Spuyten Duyvil Creek, roughly parallel to today's 230th Street. The King's Bridge was part of Boston Post Road, connecting southern Westchester County (which later became the Bronx) with Marble Hill, once part of Manhattan Island and still part of the borough of Manhattan. The bridge is said to still be in place, having been buried when the creek bed was filled in. The creek's water flow was redirected to the new and deeper shipping canal, south of Marble Hill.

For most of the American Revolutionary War, the area was under British control. Initially fortified by American Patriots in 1776, it quickly fell to British forces, who held the area for three years and built forts there to defend northern Manhattan and control the approach from Westchester. A stone wall in Fort Independence Park/Playground (on Sedgwick Avenue and Giles Place) is believed to be the only extant physical trace of Fort Independence built by the Continental Army in 1776 and later destroyed by British forces. On January 18–28, 1777, an American force led by General William Heath unsuccessfully attempted to recapture Fort Independence. The nearby Old Fort Four Park/Playground (at 2890 Sedgwick Ave.) is named for Fort Number Four, which was the largest in a series of eight outer defenses built by the Continental Army in 1777.

Until the later part of the 19th century Riverdale, Kingsbridge, and other areas now in the northwest Bronx were part of the Town of Yonkers. The areas that are within modern-day New York City's modern borders broke off to form the Town of Kingsbridge. In 1874, the City of New York annexed three towns that later became the western half of the Bronx, including the Town of Kingsbridge. As the trains to Manhattan were built in the 20th century, a stop in the northwest Bronx along the Hudson River called Riverdale-on-Hudson, now Riverdale, was created. This gave rise to the Riverdale neighborhood. The remainder of the old Town of Kingsbridge developed into the modern-day Kingsbridge neighborhood.

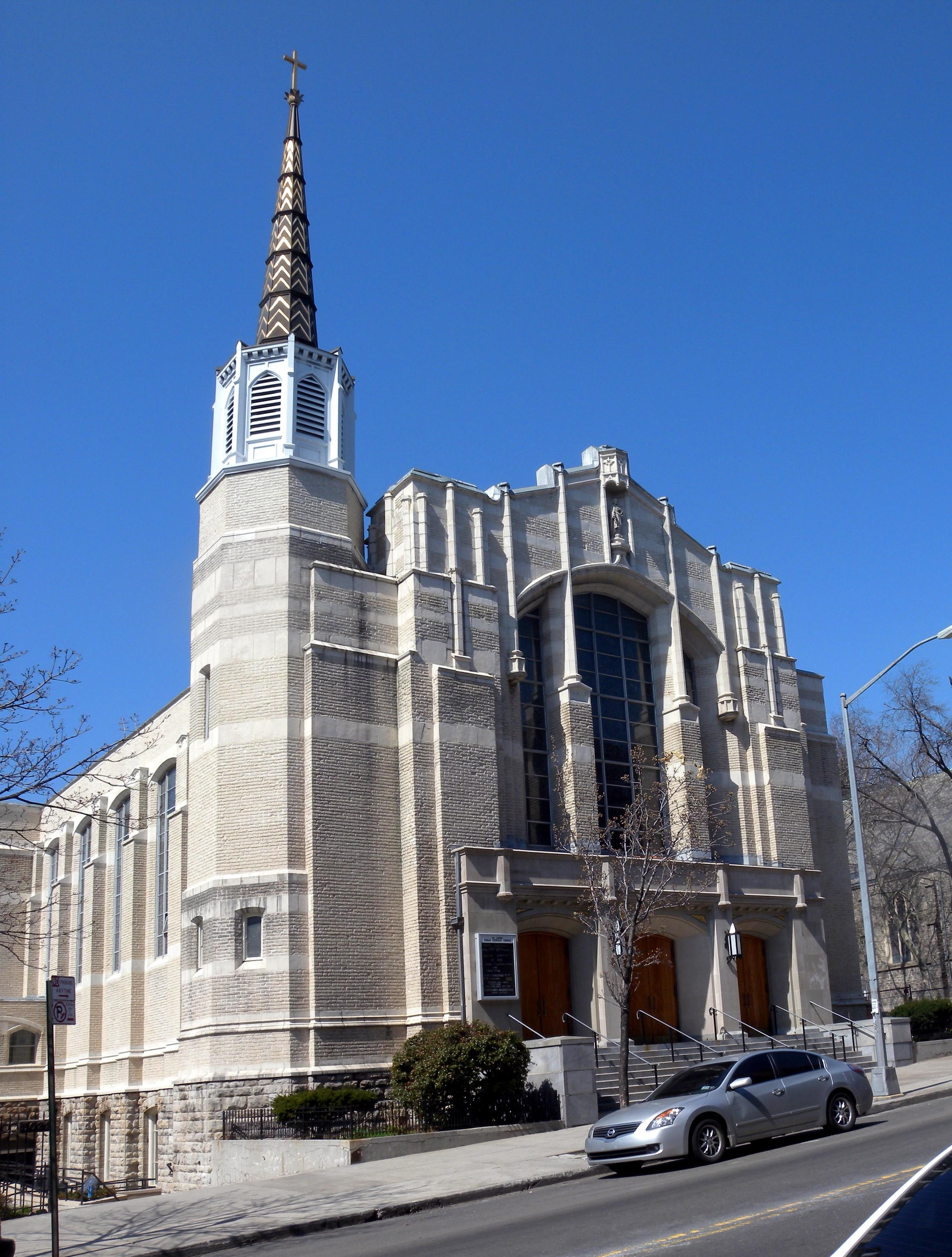
St John's Roman Catholic Church

Historical documents reveal that the Black population of Kingsbridge was proportionally much higher in the distant past than it is today, due to the number of Africans enslaved by local landowners from the late 1600s to mid 1800s. In more recent history, it became a neighborhood of predominately Irish immigrants. From the late 1970s the Irish population has decreased significantly, being replaced by large numbers of African-Americans, Hispanics, Asians, Albanians, and Greeks. According to an account by The New York Times, the largest Hispanic group in Kingsbridge today are Dominicans, replacing the earlier Puerto Ricans and Cubans, who were the first Hispanics to settle in the neighborhood in the 1970s. There still is a strong Irish population centered on Bailey Avenue and Tibbett Avenue. The Dominicans predominantly live along Broadway and adjacent side streets, with a predominantly mixed ethnic area east and west of Broadway.

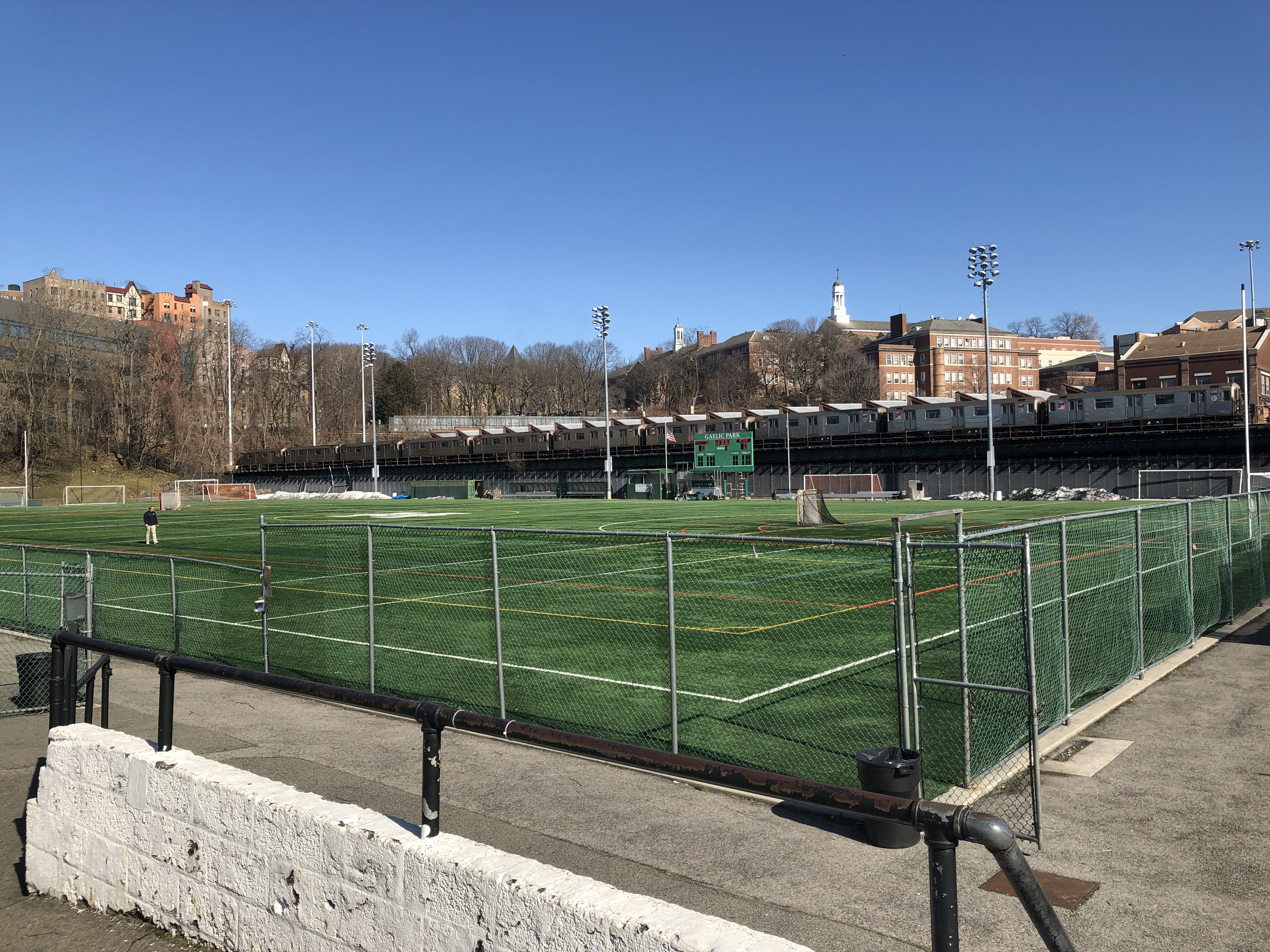
Gaelic Park

The Irish legacy can still be seen in the Roman Catholic churches and schools that serve the current residents, such as the St. John's Roman Catholic Church on Kingsbridge Avenue near 231st Street, and its two schools; the elementary school on Godwin Terrace (just south of 231st Street), and the junior high school on Kingsbridge Avenue just a block north of 231st Street. In northern Kingsbridge the Visitation Roman Catholic Church and School is located on West 239th street. To the east, on Sedgwick Avenue is Our Lady of Angels Church and School. For recreation Gaelic Park (now operated by Manhattan University) is located on 240th Street & Broadway and is the venue for a variety of sports including Gaelic football and hurling. The neighborhood is also home to Manhattan University.

Kingsbridge was home to the 77-year-old Stella D'Oro factory, which was relocated to Ashland, Ohio when Stella D'Oro was sold to Lance after labor unrest in 2009.

== Demographics ==
Based on data from the 2010 United States census, the population of Kingsbridge and Spuyten Duyvil was 30,161, a change of 289 (1%) from the 29,872 counted in 2000. Covering an area of 540.92 acres (218.90 ha), the neighborhood had a population density of 55.8 inhabitants per acre (35,700/sq mi; 13,800/km^{2}).

The racial makeup of the neighborhoods were 49.3% (14,872) White, 8.9% (2,691) African American, 0.1% (40) Native American, 5.7% (1,731) Asian, 0% (15) Pacific Islander, 0.3% (98) from other races, and 1.7% (510) from two or more races. Hispanic or Latino of any race were 33.8% (10,204) of the population.

The entirety of Community District 8, which comprises Kingsbridge and Riverdale, had 102,927 inhabitants as of NYC Health's 2018 Community Health Profile, with an average life expectancy of 80.9 years. This is about the same as the median life expectancy of 81.2 for all New York City neighborhoods. Most inhabitants are youth and middle-aged adults: 20% are between the ages of between 0–17, 28% between 25 and 44, and 25% between 45 and 64. The ratio of college-aged and elderly residents was lower, at 9% and 18% respectively.

As of 2017, the median household income in Community District 8 was $53,986. In 2018, an estimated 15% of Kingsbridge and Riverdale residents lived in poverty, compared to 25% in all of the Bronx and 20% in all of New York City. One in 11 residents (9%) were unemployed, compared to 13% in the Bronx and 9% in New York City. Rent burden, or the percentage of residents who have difficulty paying their rent, is 52% in Kingsbridge and Riverdale, compared to the boroughwide and citywide rates of 58% and 51% respectively. Based on this calculation, as of 2018, Kingsbridge and Riverdale were considered high-income relative to the rest of the city and not gentrifying.

== Police and crime ==
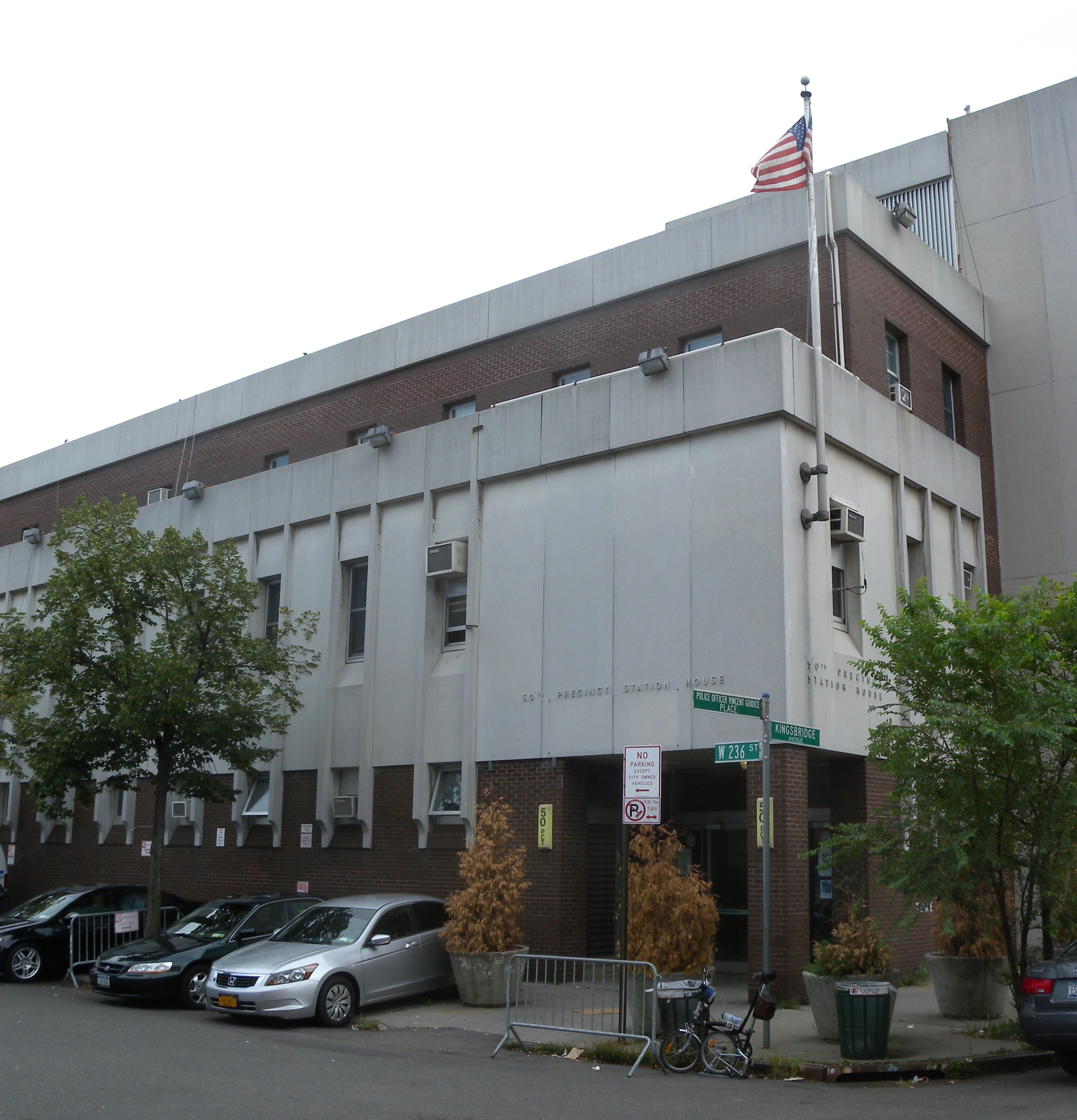
50th Precinct

Kingsbridge and Riverdale are patrolled by the 50th Precinct of the NYPD, located at 3450 Kingsbridge Avenue. NYCHA property in the area is patrolled by P.S.A. 8 at 2794 Randall Avenue in the Throggs Neck section of the Bronx.

The 50th Precinct ranked 13th-safest out of 69 patrol areas for per-capita crime in 2010. As of 2018, with a non-fatal assault rate of 40 per 100,000 people, Kingsbridge and Riverdale's rate of violent crimes per capita is less than that of the city as a whole. The incarceration rate of 225 per 100,000 people is lower than that of the city as a whole.

The 50th Precinct has a lower crime rate than in the 1990s, with crimes across all categories having decreased by 69.9% between 1990 and 2022. The precinct reported three murders, 22 rapes, 185 robberies, 213 felony assaults, 126 burglaries, 695 grand larcenies, and 288 grand larcenies auto in 2022.

== Fire safety ==
Kingsbridge contains a New York City Fire Department (FDNY) fire station, Engine Co. 81/Ladder Co. 46, at 3025 Bailey Avenue.

== Health ==
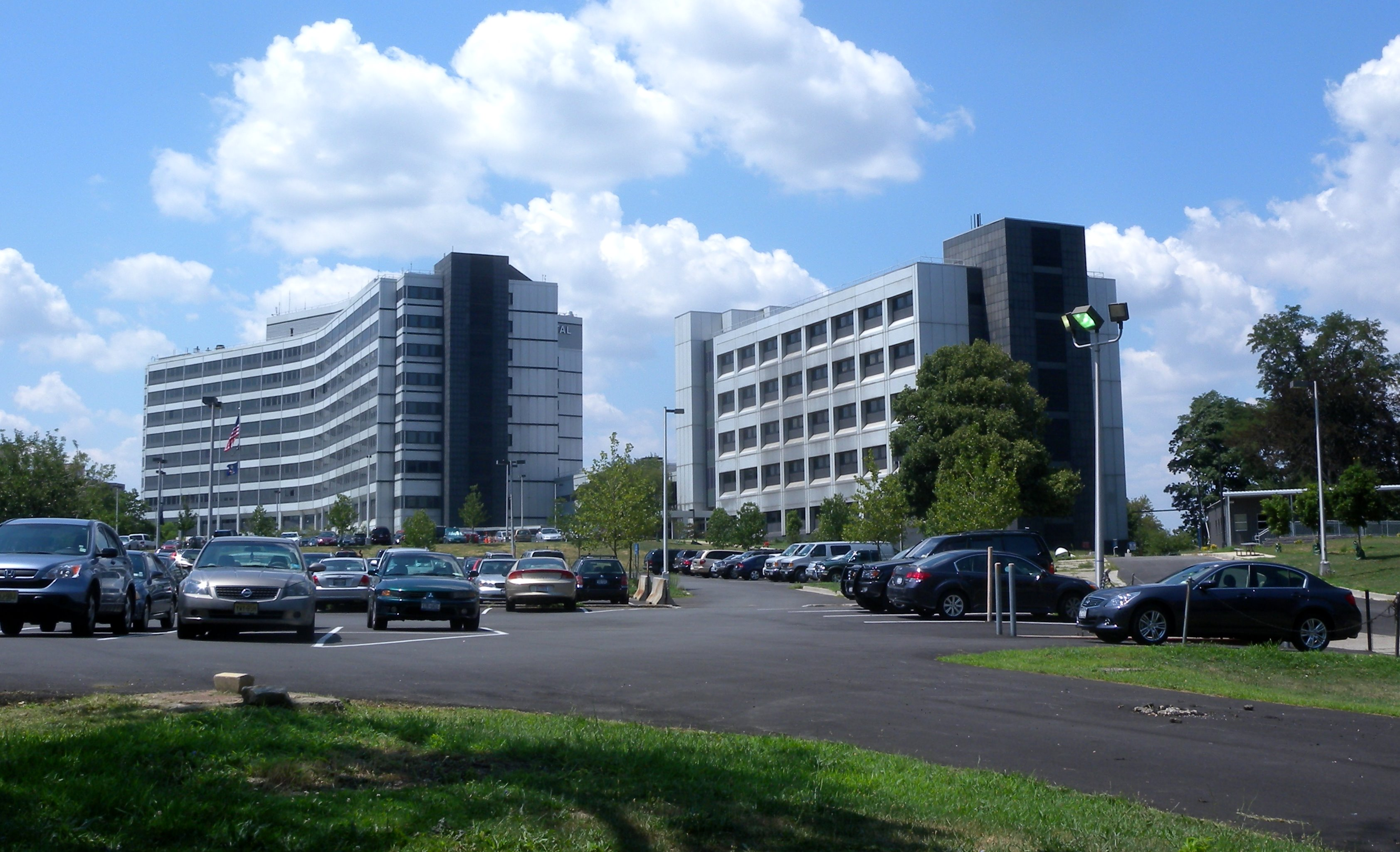
James J. Peters VA Medical Center research building, to the right

As of 2018, preterm births were slightly more common in Kingsbridge and Riverdale than in other places citywide, though births to teenage mothers were less common. In Kingsbridge and Riverdale, there were 89 preterm births per 1,000 live births (compared to 87 per 1,000 citywide), and 13.1 births to teenage mothers per 1,000 live births (compared to 19.3 per 1,000 citywide). Kingsbridge and Riverdale have a relatively average population of residents who are uninsured. In 2018, this population of uninsured residents was estimated to be 16%, higher than the citywide rate of 12%.

The concentration of fine particulate matter, the deadliest type of air pollutant, in Kingsbridge and Riverdale is 0.0075 milligrams per cubic metre (7.5×10^{−9} oz/ft^{3}), more than the city average. Ten percent of Kingsbridge and Riverdale residents are smokers, which is lower than the city average of 14% of residents being smokers. In Kingsbridge and Riverdale, 24% of residents are obese, 12% are diabetic, and 28% have high blood pressure—compared to the citywide averages of 24%, 11%, and 28% respectively. In addition, 21% of children are obese, compared to the citywide average of 20%.

Eighty-six percent of residents eat some fruits and vegetables every day, which is slightly less than the city's average of 87%. In 2018, 83% of residents described their health as "good", "very good", or "excellent", higher than the city's average of 78%. For every supermarket in Kingsbridge and Riverdale, there are 10 bodegas.

The nearest hospitals are James J. Peters VA Medical Center in Kingsbridge Heights, North Central Bronx Hospital, and Montefiore Medical Center in Norwood.

== Politics ==
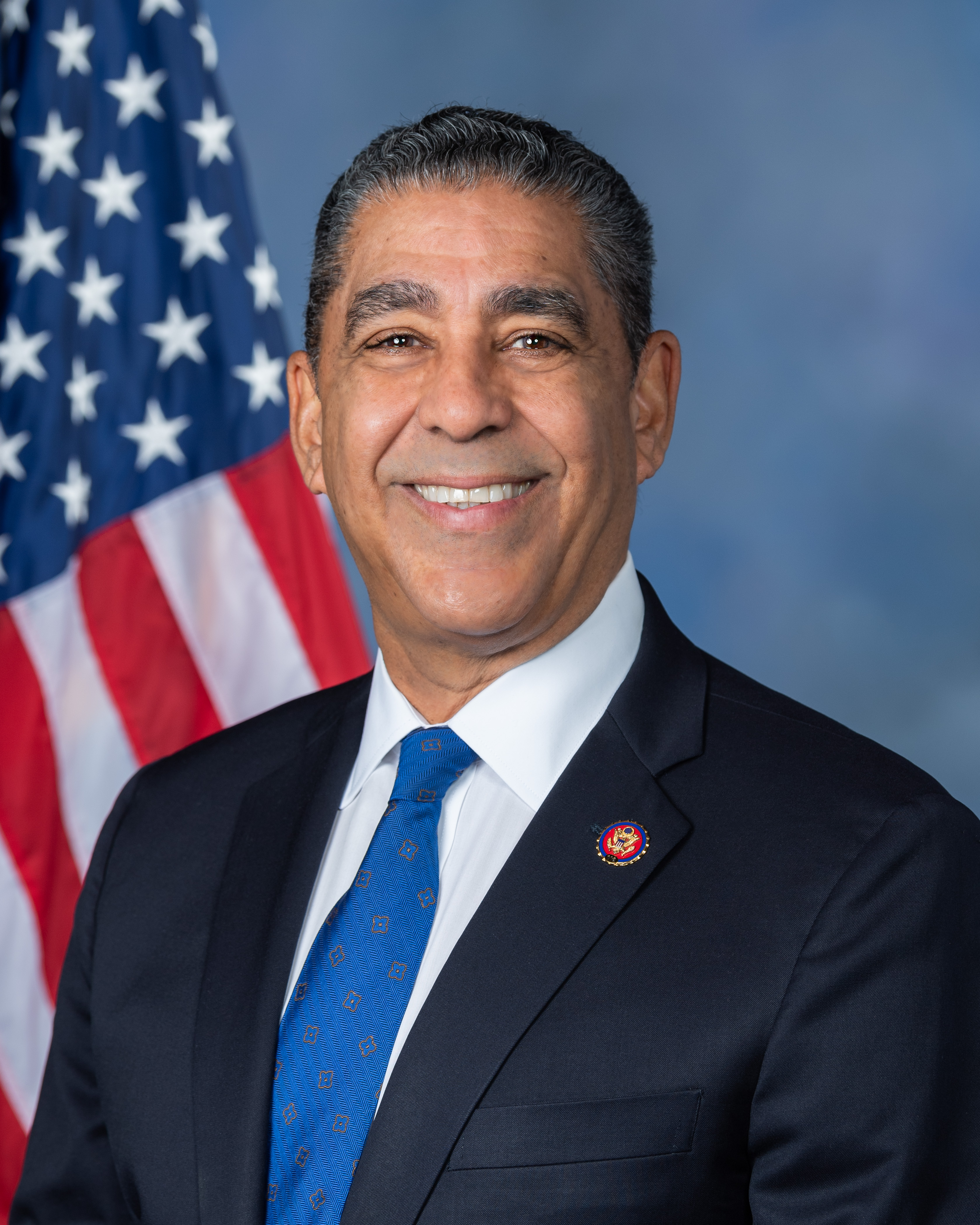
Adriano Espaillat

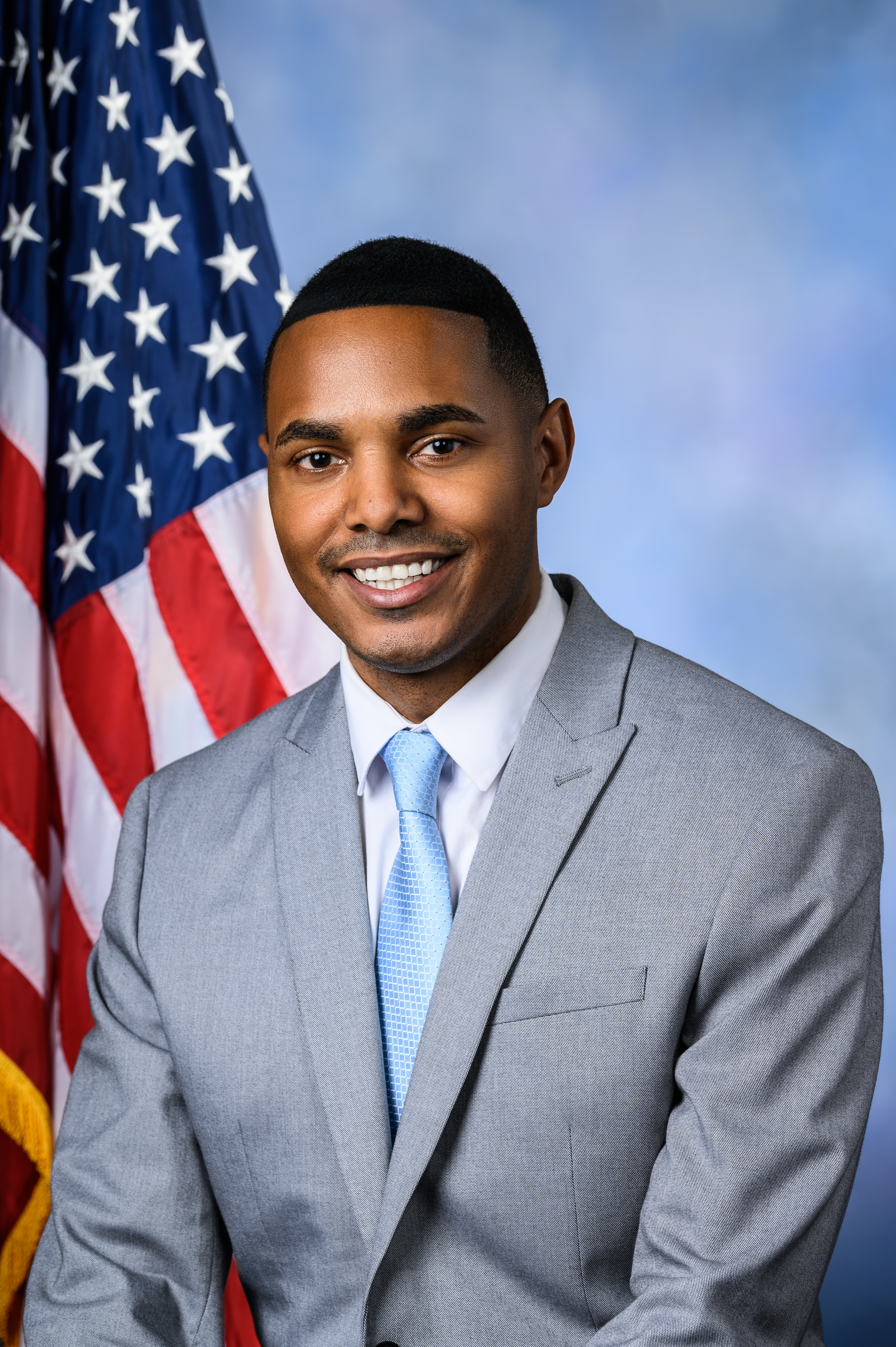
Ritchie Torres

Politically, Kingsbridge is in New York's 13th congressional district for the United States House of Representatives represented by Democrat Adriano Espaillat since 2017, and in New York's 15th congressional district represented by Democrat Ritchie Torres since 2021.

On the state level, it is also part of the 33rd New York State Senate District, represented by Democrat Gustavo Rivera, and part of the 34th New York State Senate District represented by Democrat Nathalia Fernandez. In the New York State Assembly, it is represented by Democrat Jeffrey Dinowitz (81st District).

On the city level, the neighborhood is part of the New York City Council 11th district, as well as the New York City Council 16th district. In those districts, it is represented by Democrats Eric Dinowitz and Pierina Sanchez, respectively.

== Post office and ZIP Code ==
Kingsbridge is located within ZIP Code 10463. The United States Postal Service operates the Kingsbridge Station post office at 5517 Broadway.

== Education ==
Kingsbridge and Riverdale generally had a similar rate of college-educated residents to the rest of the city as of 2018. While 45% of residents age 25 and older had a college education or higher, 18% had less than a high school education and 37% were high school graduates or had some college education. By contrast, 26% of Bronx residents and 43% of city residents had a college education or higher. The percentage of Kingsbridge and Riverdale students excelling in math rose from 21% in 2000 to 48% in 2011, and reading achievement increased from 28% to 33% during the same time period.

Kingsbridge and Riverdale's rate of elementary school student absenteeism is about the same as the rest of New York City. In Kingsbridge and Riverdale, 20% of elementary school students missed 20 or more days per school year, higher than the citywide average of 20%. Additionally, 78% of high school students in Kingsbridge and Riverdale graduate on time, higher than the citywide average of 75%.

=== Schools ===
Public schools are operated by the New York City Department of Education. Kingsbridge is located near the following public elementary schools, which serve grades PK-5 unless otherwise indicated:

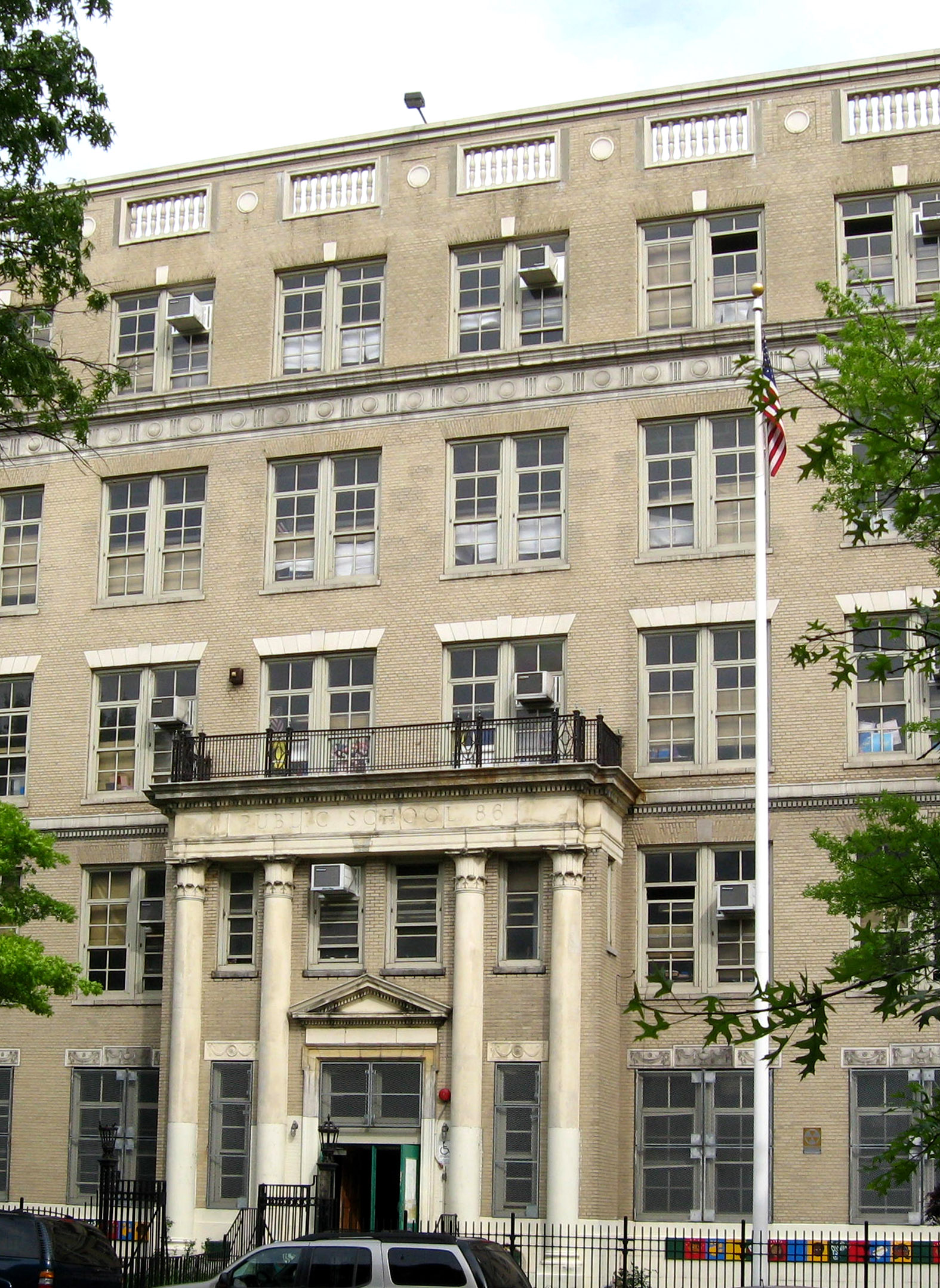
PS 86

- PS 7 Kingsbridge
- PS 37 Multiple Intelligence School (grades K-8)
- PS 86 Kingsbridge Heights (grades PK-6)
- PS 207 (grades PK-2)
- PS 307 Eames Place (grades K-5)
- PS 310 Marble Hill
- PS 360

The following middle/high school is located in Kingsbridge:

- In Tech Academy – MS/HS 368 (grades 6–12)

=== Libraries ===
The New York Public Library (NYPL) operates two branches near Kingsbridge. The Van Cortlandt branch is located at 3882 Cannon Place. The two-story, 5,800-square-foot (540 m^{2}) branch opened in 2019, replacing a smaller one-story branch a few blocks away, which opened in 1969 and consisted of a single room. The Kingsbridge branch is located at 3874 Sedgwick Avenue. The current two-story building is the branch's fourth structure since the establishment of the Kingsbridge Free Library in 1894. McKim, Mead & White designed a Carnegie library for Kingsbridge when the NYPL took over the Kingsbridge branch in 1905; a third library structure was built at 280 West 231st Street in 1959, across from the current site.

== Transportation ==
The following MTA Regional Bus Operations bus routes serve Kingsbridge:

- Bx1: to Third Avenue–138th Street station (via Grand Concourse)
- Bx3: to George Washington Bridge Bus Station (via University Avenue)
- Bx7: to College of Mount Saint Vincent or 168th Street station (via Broadway)
- Bx9: to Riverdale or West Farms Square–East Tremont Avenue station (via Kingsbridge Road)
- Bx10: to College of Mount Saint Vincent or Norwood–205th Street station (via Riverdale Avenue)
- Bx20: to Riverdale or Inwood–207th Street station (via Henry Hudson Parkway)
- BxM1: express to Riverdale or Midtown Manhattan (via East Side)
- BxM2: express to Penn Station (via West Side)
- BxM18: express to Lower Manhattan

The following New York City Subway stations serve Kingsbridge:

- 231st Street station (1 train)
- 238th Street station (1 train)

The nearest Metro-North Railroad station is Marble Hill (Metro-North station) of the Hudson Line, located on W 225th Street.

== In popular culture ==
=== Films ===
- Scenes from Martin Scorsese's The Irishman (2019) were filmed in the American Legion in Kingsbridge.
- Brad Pitt and Harrison Ford were filmed drinking and playing pool at Piper's Kilt on West 231st Street in The Devil's Own (1997).
- A scene from The Seven Ups (1973) was filmed near DeWitt Clinton High School and The Bronx High School of Science.

=== Television ===
- In Season 1, Episode 5 of Sneaky Pete, Marius/Pete and Audrey are shown eating in diner set in Bridgeport, CT that is actually Tibbett Diner on Tibbett Avenue. Otto is shown in a car outside with the houses on Corlear Avenue in the background.

== See also ==
- John F. Kennedy High School (Bronx, New York)
- Walton High School (New York City)
- Episcopal Church of the Mediator (Bronx, New York)
- John Jay McKelvey Sr., Attorney, Park District Protection League Trustee, Spuyten Duyvil.
