= Gustavo Rivera (politician) =

Puerto Rican politician

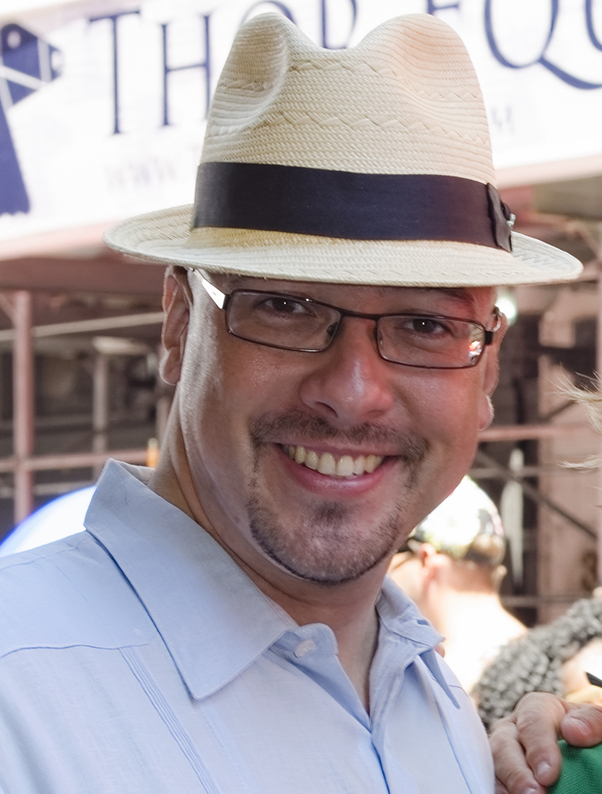

Member of the New York State Senate from the 33rd district
- Incumbent
- Assumed office January 1, 2011
- Preceded by: Pedro Espada Jr.

Personal details
- Born: November 19, 1975 (age 50) Santurce, Puerto Rico
- Party: Democratic
- Education: University of Puerto Rico, Río Piedras (BA); City University of New York (MA, PhD)
- Website: State Senate website

Gustavo Rivera (born November 19, 1975) is an American politician. A Democrat, he has represented New York's 33rd State Senate district in the New York State Senate since first being elected in 2010.

== Background ==
Rivera was born and raised in Santurce, San Juan, Puerto Rico. He received a B.A. in political science from the University of Puerto Rico in May 1998. Following graduation, Rivera moved to New York to begin a doctoral program in political science at the Graduate Center of the City University of New York. He taught courses at Hunter College until 2002, and served as an assistant professor of Political Science at Pace University until his first election in 2010.

Rivera started in electorial politics by serving as campaign manager for politicians such as Phil Reed and his future colleagues Jose M. Serrano and Andrea Stewart-Cousins.

In September 2010, he was named one of City Hall's "40 under 40" for being a young influential member of New York City politics.

== New York Senate ==
After serving as Director of Outreach under United States Senator Kirsten Gillibrand, Rivera decided to run for the New York State Senate in 2010. The incumbent, Senator Pedro Espada Jr., had long been a staple in Bronx politics. Espada was considered the favorite throughout the election. After a hard-fought campaign, Rivera ultimately defeated Espada in the Democratic primary. Espada would later be convicted of embezzlement.

In the Senate, Rivera is known as a leading progressive voice. After Democrats retook the Senate majority following the 2018 elections, Rivera was named chair of the Senate Health Committee. As of 2026, he also served as co-chair of the Joint Senate Task Force on Opioids, Addiction & Overdose Prevention. Rivera has advocated for the New York Health Act.

Rivera won reelection in 2020, defeating Republican Dustin Martinez and Conservative Party candidate Steven M. Stern. In 2022, after redistricting made the 33rd district more competitive, he defeated Miguelina Camilo by 506 votes in the Democratic primary and won reelection in the general election. He was reelected again in 2024, defeating Republican Dion J. Powell.
