= Atlanta Democratic Socialists of America =

Chapter of the US political organization

- Abbreviation: Atlanta DSA or ATLDSA
- Governing body: Steering Committee
- Headquarters: 1083 Austin Avenue NE, Atlanta
- Membership (July 2026): ▲1,813
- Ideology: Democratic socialism; Socialism (multi-tendency)
- Political position: Left-wing to far-left
- National affiliation: Democratic Socialists of America
- Atlanta City Council: 1 / 15
- State House (Atlanta metro): 1 / 65 (Note: DSA does not have a ballot line of its own. DSA runs candidates on the ballot lines of other political parties. The vast majority of DSA members in elected office ran on the Democratic Party ballot line.)

Website
- atldsa.org

Atlanta Democratic Socialists of America (Atlanta DSA) is the Atlanta chapter of the Democratic Socialists of America (DSA). Starting in the early 2020s, the chapter became a significant force in the political landscape of Atlanta. The chapter has participated in protests, electoral campaigns, ballot initiatives, and labor organizing.

== History ==
=== Early history ===
After NAM and DSOC merged to form DSA in 1982, DSOC member Julian Bond became a member of the new organization. He was the first DSA member elected to the Georgia State Senate and Georgia General Assembly.

After the original Atlanta DSA chapter dissolved in the 1980s, the chapter was re-founded as Metro Atlanta Democratic Socialists of America (MADSA) in 2006 by retired AFSCME organizer Milt Tambor. In 2007, the newly-elected U.S. Senator from Vermont, Bernie Sanders, gave the keynote speech at the first Douglass-Debs Dinner, a fundraiser event that the chapter holds annually. The event is named for abolitionist Frederick Douglass and Socialist Party of America leader Eugene V. Debs.

The chapter grew significantly during and in the wake of the Bernie Sanders 2016 presidential campaign, peaking at 2,200 members in summer 2026 before territory centered on the suburb of Marietta was spun off into an independent Northwest Georgia DSA organizing committee. The chapter's 1,800 members make it the largest in the Southeast.

=== Growth post-2016 ===
The 2019 DSA National Convention was held in Atlanta.

In 2021, the chapter updated their name to Atlanta Democratic Socialists of America (Atlanta DSA), dropping the "Metro" descriptor.

In August 2026, the chapter opened an office in the Little Five Points neighborhood of Atlanta, named the Milt Tambor Organizing Center in honor of the chapter's founder. The previous office was shared with the American Friends Service Committee's South Region headquarters in the West End neighborhood.

== Electoral campaigns ==
Unlike most political parties, Atlanta DSA does not have a ballot line. Instead, ATLDSA performs party-like roles like endorsing, pamphleteering, and canvassing for candidates it supports in a "party-surrogate" strategy. ATLDSA has endorsed and run candidates in local and state elections. It has also engaged in pressure campaigns against elected officials, aiming to sway their vote on legislation.

=== Elected offices ===
In 2023, Atlanta DSA endorsed the campaign of Gabriel Sanchez for State House in District 42, the largely suburban city of Smyrna, in Cobb County. The campaign canvassed the area extensively, knocking over 17,000 doors and eventually winning the primary race against then-incumbent Teri Anulewicz with 56.8% of the vote. Sanchez's victory came as an upset, with Anulewicz being the only Democratic incumbent in the State House to lose re-nomination to a challenger.

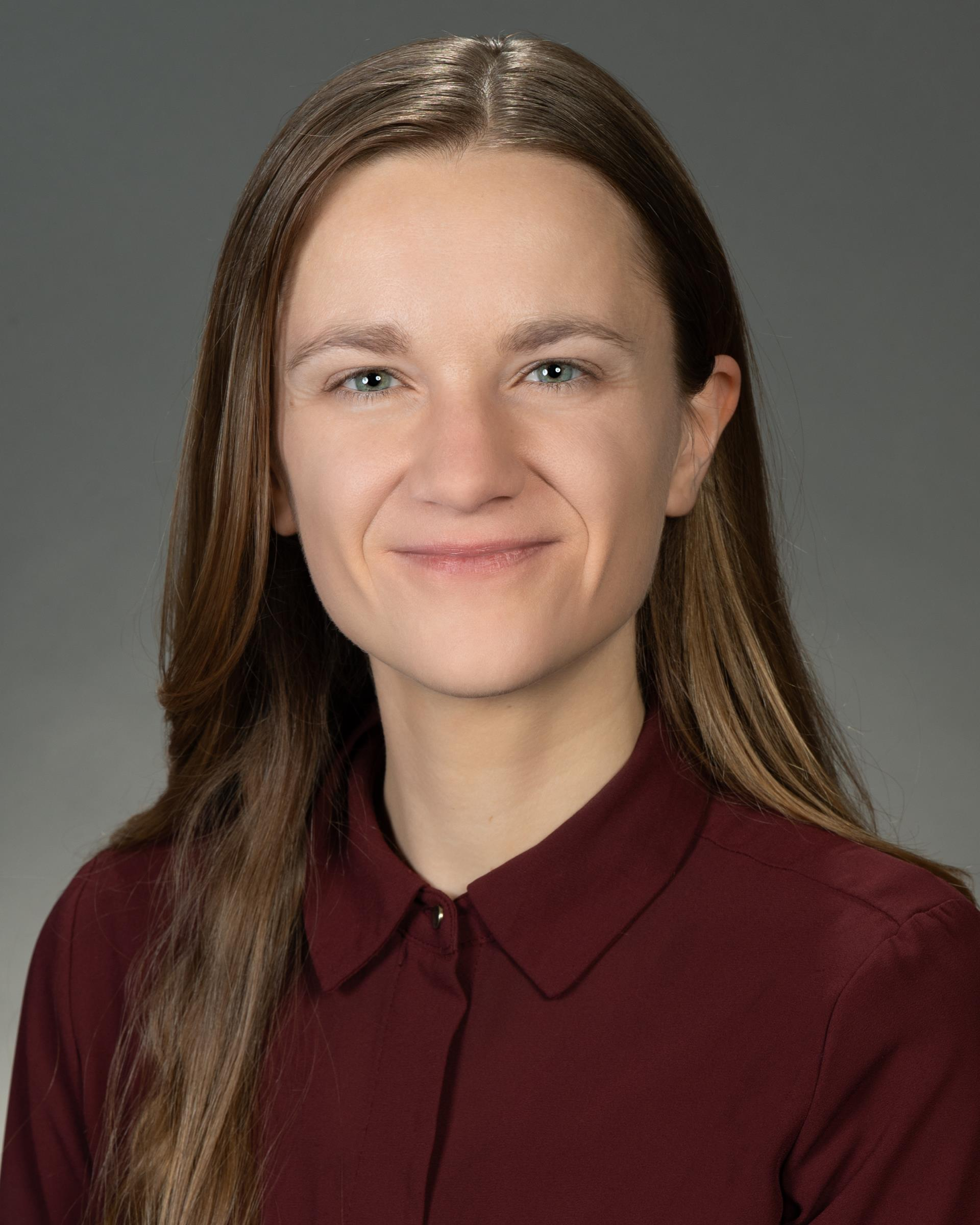
Kelsea Bond official portrait, 2026

In the 2025 Atlanta municipal election cycle, Atlanta DSA ran labor organizer and former chapter co-chair Kelsea Bond for City Council District 2. After then-incumbent Amir Farokhi resigned to take a position with the Galloway School, Bond defeated a multi-candidate field with 64% of the vote. They succeeded interim councilor Carden Wyckoff, who did not run, on January 5, 2026. In running the campaign Bond drew on their experience organizing in the labor movement and as campaign manager during Gabriel Sanchez's 2024 run for State House.

In 2026, State House Rep. Park Cannon announced her intention to retire at the end of her term. ATLDSA drafted and endorsed Mathewos Samson, a software engineer who joined the organization the previous year. After finishing second in the first-round with 29% of the vote, Samson went on to defeat Demetria Henderson with 66% of the vote in the runoff. He faces Republican Torrey Balam in the general election, scheduled for November 2026.

=== Stop Cop City ballot initiative ===
In 2021, members of Atlanta DSA began to organize around the issue of a public safety training center, better known as Cop City, being planned in unincorporated DeKalb County. The broader Stop Cop City protest movement included the Forest Defenders, a decentralized group of activists, the Atlanta Peoples' Movement, and the Atlanta Solidarity Fund. In 2023, Atlanta DSA's primary contributions included working on organizing efforts to gather over 100,000 signatures from residents, looking to get a ballot measure scheduled for the November municipal elections. Georgia's state constitution allows residents to force a referendum on decisions by local governments if they can get 15% of registered voters to sign petition; in Atlanta, 60,000 to 70,000 signatures would be required. The city said cancellation of the lease would not be legal.

After bank boxes containing 116,000 signatures were delivered to City Hall, City Council refused to count them, citing a legal case mired in appeals. In January 2026, a panel of the 11th Circuit Court of Appeals issued a 2-1 ruling that the petition to force a referendum was invalid.

=== Build Beltline Rail campaign ===
After Kelsea Bond joined the Atlanta City Council, the chapter launched an effort to support Bond's campaign goal of completing a promised light rail line along the Atlanta Beltline corridor. After progress stalled in 2026, Bond introduced legislation affirming the city's commitment to constructing all 22 miles of planned light rail. The introduction came days after Atlanta Beltline, Inc released its three-year study on transit for the corridor.

== See also ==
- Young Democratic Socialists of America
- Democratic Socialists of America chapters:
  - New York City Democratic Socialists of America
  - Chicago Democratic Socialists of America
  - Los Angeles Democratic Socialists of America
  - Metro DC Democratic Socialists of America
  - Seattle Democratic Socialists of America
- DSA members:
  - List of Democratic Socialists of America public officeholders
  - Category:Members of the Democratic Socialists of America
- History of socialism in the United States:
  - Socialism in the United States
  - American Left
