= List of chapters of the Democratic Socialists of America =

This is a list of chapters of the Democratic Socialists of America with at least 250 members or multiple elected officials. Both Endorsed and Member Candidates as determined by the list of Democratic Socialists of America public officeholders are considered for the statistics on here.

== Chapters ==
=== List of chapters with 2000+ members ===
Chapter	Membership	State(s)	Mayor	City council	Governor	State government seats (upper/lower chamber)	Congressional seats (Senate/House)	Website
New York City DSA	15,009 (Sept. 2026)	New York	1 / 1	4 / 51	0 / 1	3 / 28 7 / 65	0 / 2 1 / 25 (Note: Rep. Alexandria Ocasio-Cortez current member and endorsee)	
DSA Los Angeles	5,937 (Sept. 2026)	California	0 / 1	4 / 15	0 / 1	0 / 13 0 / 24	0 / 2 0 / 52	
Metro DC DSA	4,028 (Sept. 2026)	District of Columbia	0 / 1	2 / 13	0 / 1			
Portland DSA	3,629 (Sept. 2026)	Oregon	0 / 1	4 / 12	0 / 1	0 / 30 1 / 60	0 / 2 0 / 6	
Chicago DSA	3,269 (Sept. 2026)	Illinois	0 / 1	6 / 50	0 / 1	1 / 16 0 / 32	0 / 2 0 / 17	
Boston DSA (Note: Includes Boston, Somerville and Cambridge Massachusetts for electeds)	3,027 (Sept. 2026)	Massachusetts	0 / 3	4 / 33	0 / 1	0 / 40 1 / 16	0 / 2 0 / 9	
Philadelphia DSA	2,722 (Sept. 2026)	Pennsylvania	0 / 1	2 / 17	0 / 1	1 / 7 2 / 26	0 / 2 0 / 17	
Twin Cities DSA (Note: Includes both St.Paul and Minneapolis for electeds)	2,666 (Sept. 2026)	Minnesota	0 / 2	7 / 20	0 / 1	2 / 23 2 / 46	0 / 2 0 / 8	
Seattle DSA	2,472 (Sept. 2026)	Washington	0 / 1	0 / 9	0 / 1	0 / 5 1 / 10	0 / 2 0 / 10	
East Bay DSA (Note: Covers several counties in the east and north bay, including Alameda and Contra Costa counties. For the statistics Berkeley, Oakland, and Richmond were used)	2,448 (Sept. 2026)	California	1 / 3	3 / 22	0 / 1	0 / 40 1 / 80	0 / 2 0 / 52	
Denver DSA	2,131 (Sept. 2026)	Colorado	0 / 1	1 / 13	0 / 1	0 / 35 2 / 65	0 / 2 0 / 8	

=== List of chapters between 1,000 and 2,000 members ===
Chapter	Membership	State(s)	Mayor	City council	Governor	State Gov't Seats (Upper/Lower Chamber)	Congressional Seats (Senate/House)	Website
Atlanta DSA	1,794 (Sept. 2026)	Georgia	0 / 1	1 / 16	0 / 1	0 / 56 1 / 180	0 / 2 0 / 14	
Austin DSA	1,692 (Sept. 2026)	Texas	0 / 1	1 / 11	0 / 1	0 / 31 0 / 150	0 / 2 0 / 38	
Metro Detroit DSA	1,623 (Sept. 2026)	Michigan	0 / 1	1 / 9	0 / 1	0 / 38 1 / 110	0 / 2 1 / 13 (Note: Rep. Rashida Tlaib current member and endorsee)	
San Francisco DSA	1,484 (Sept. 2026)	California	0 / 1	1 / 11	0 / 1	0 / 31 0 / 150	0 / 2 0 / 52	
North New Jersey DSA	1,468 (Sept. 2026)	New Jersey	0 / 1 (Note: Jersey City Mayor)	2 / 9 (Note: Jersey City City Council)	0 / 1	0 / 40 2 / 80	0 / 2 0 / 12	
DSA San Diego	1,396 (Sept. 2026)	California	0 / 1	2 / 9	0 / 1	0 / 31 0 / 150	0 / 2 0 / 52	
Connecticut DSA	1,332 (Sept. 2026)	Connecticut	0 / 2	2 / 15 (Note: Hamden Legislative Council) 1 / 12 (Note: Middletown Common Council)	0 / 1	0 / 33 3 / 151	0 / 2 0 / 6	
Greater Baltimore DSA	1,277 (Sept. 2026)	Maryland	0 / 1	0 / 14	0 / 1	0 / 47 0 / 141	0 / 2 0 / 8	

=== List of chapters between 500 and 1,000 members ===
Chapter	Membership	State(s)	Mayor	City council	Governor	State Gov't Seats (Upper/Lower Chamber)	Congressional Seats (Senate/House)	Website
Madison Area DSA	967 (Sept. 2026)	Wisconsin	0 / 1	0 / 20	0 / 1	1 / 33 0 / 99	0 / 2 0 / 8	
Milwaukee DSA	901 (Sept. 2026)	Wisconsin	0 / 1	1 / 15	0 / 1	2 / 33 0 / 99	0 / 2 0 / 8	
Louisville DSA	777 (Sept. 2026)	Kentucky	0 / 1	1 / 26	0 / 1	0 / 38 1 / 100	0 / 2 0 / 6	
Louisville DSA	777 (Sept. 2026)	Indiana	0 / 1	0 / 9	0 / 1	0 / 50 0 / 100	0 / 2 0 / 9	
Metro Cincinnati and NKY DSA	701 (Sept. 2026)	Ohio	0 / 1	0 / 9	0 / 1	0 / 33 0 / 99	0 / 2 0 / 15	
Metro Cincinnati and NKY DSA	701 (Sept. 2026)	Kentucky	0 / 2	0 / 4 (Note: Covington Board of Commissioners) 0 / 4 (Note: Newport Board of Commissioners)	0 / 1	0 / 38 0 / 100	0 / 2 0 / 6	

=== List of chapters between 250 and 500 members ===
Chapter	Membership	State(s)	Mayor	City council	Governor	State Gov't Seats (Upper/Lower Chamber)	Congressional Seats (Senate/House)	Website
Twin Ports DSA (Note: Covers Duluth and Superior, Wisconsin)	308 (Sept. 2026)	Minnesota	0 / 1	0 / 9	0 / 1	1 / 6 1 / 4	0 / 2 0 / 8	
Twin Ports DSA	308 (Sept. 2026)	Wisconsin	0 / 1	0 / 10	0 / 1	0 / 33 0 / 99	0 / 2 0 / 8	
Ithaca DSA	253 (Sept. 2026)	New York	1 / 1	5 / 10	0 / 1	0 / 28 0 / 65	0 / 2 0 / 25	

== See also ==
- List of state parties of the Democratic Party (United States)
