= Los Angeles Democratic Socialists of America =

Chapter of the US political organization

- Abbreviation: DSA-LA
- Governing body: Steering Committee
- Membership (July 2026): ▲5,984
- Ideology: Democratic socialism; Socialism (multi-tendency)
- Political position: Left-wing
- National affiliation: Democratic Socialists of America
- Los Angeles City Council: 4 / 15 (Note: DSA does not have a ballot line of its own. DSA runs candidates on the ballot lines of other political parties. The vast majority of DSA members in elected office ran on the Democratic Party ballot line.)
- LA citywide executive offices: 3 / 3
- LAUSD Board Members: 2 / 7
- U.S. House (City of L.A.): 1 / 9

Website
- dsa-la.org

Los Angeles Democratic Socialists of America (DSA-LA) is the Los Angeles County chapter of the Democratic Socialists of America (DSA). In the late 2010s and early 2020s, DSA-LA became a significant force in LA politics through Los Angeles City Council campaigns and labor organizing. DSA-LA is the 2nd-largest DSA chapter, below NYC-DSA and above Metro DC DSA.

== Structure ==
In 2026, DSA-LA had over 5,000 dues-paying members, up from 1,000 in 2018. DSA-LA has five branches: Central, Eastside/San Gabriel Valley, San Fernando Valley, Westside, and South Central/Inglewood.

Since 2018, DSA-LA holds an annual convention at which members set chapter priorities. Leadership elections to the DSA-LA Steering Committee and Branch Coordinator positions are held near the end of the calendar year, with elected leaders starting their positions in January of the new year. Hugo Soto-Martinez was an elected leader within DSA-LA, though he stepped down to seek DSA endorsement in his run for city council.

== History ==
In 1982, the Democratic Socialists of America (DSA) formed as a merger of the Democratic Socialist Organizing Committee and the New American Movement. In the 1980s, DSA had two local chapters: One in Los Angeles, one in San Fernando Valley. In 1989, the LA chapter had about 400 local members and supported a stronger labor movement, rent control, and social spending for disadvantaged communities. DSA-LA hosted the 2005 DSA National Convention.

In 2016, DSA-LA grew dramatically, alongside national DSA, after Bernie Sanders' first presidential campaign and the election of Donald Trump. DSA-LA's membership tripled, as members organized around anti-deportation politics and other local campaigns.

By the mid-2020s, DSA-LA had become one of the most electorally successful DSA chapters in the country, based on extensive voter outreach and canvassing work. In 2024, DSA-LA endorsees held 4 of 15 Los Angeles City Council seats, among the highest concentration of DSA officeholders in any major American city. City Journal called the 2022 primary results evidence of "the expanding political might of L.A.'s socialist Left". In 2024, the Los Angeles Times described DSA-LA's city council wins as having broken the "near-invincible aura" of the Los Angeles political "establishment," giving progressive groups sway in local government.

== Electoral campaigns ==
Unlike most political parties, DSA Los Angeles does not have a ballot line. Instead, DSA-LA acts "like a party" or a "party surrogate" by endorsing and canvassing for candidates it supports.

=== City of Los Angeles ===
In the 2020 Los Angeles elections, DSA-LA endorsed urban planner Nithya Raman against incumbent council member David Ryu. Raman joined DSA shortly before seeking DSA-LA's endorsement. Raman received extensive DSA support, and had a "volunteer army" of 600 DSA & other progressive canvassers who knocked 83,000 doors. The Los Angeles Police Protective League (LAPPL) strongly opposed Raman and spent over $200,000 in support of Ryu. Raman won their top-two runoff election with 70,317 votes (52.9%). Raman was the first challenger to unseat a sitting Los Angeles City Council member in 17 years, and won the most votes of any city councilor in history, representing a progressive challenge to City Hall.

In 2022, DSA-LA endorsed labor organizer Hugo Soto-Martinez in Council District 13, against incumbent Mitch O'Farrell, and abolitionist organizer and La Defensa co-founder Eunisses Hernandez in Council District 1, against incumbent Gil Cedillo. Hernandez and Soto-Martinez were DSA members for a long time before endorsement, though only Soto-Martinez has been described as a "cadre" member. Soto-Martinez linked his campaign to both DSA-LA and UNITE HERE Local 11, where he had organized for fifteen years. DSA-LA members had knocked on some 35,000 doors for Soto-Martinez, and his electoral coalition represented democratic socialists, progressives, and organized labor. Soto-Martinez and Hernandez both supported shifting funding from police to housing, child care and other social services. Soto-Martinez marked himself as an "abolitionist" on DSA-LA's candidate questionnaire. Police unions, including the Association for Los Angeles Deputy Sheriffs (ALADS) and LAPPL, sharply criticized Hernandez and Soto-Martinez, and spent hundreds of thousands of dollars to oppose their election. Both DSA candidates won their top-two runoff elections: Soto-Martinez won 37,800 votes (57.7%), Hernandez won 16,108 votes (53.89%).

In 2024, DSA-LA re-endorsed Raman and endorsed tenant rights attorney Ysabel Jurado in Council District 14 against incumbent Kevin de León. Jurado formally joined DSA soon before endorsement, but had organized with DSA's "Power Mass Transit" campaign for two years before. de León's election mailers called Jurado "a DSA puppet". DSA-LA volunteers door-knocked extensively for Jurado. In January, centrist LA megadonors formed Thrive LA PAC, which announced a seven-figure campaign to unseat Raman. de León and LAPPL attacked Jurado over support for police abolition and shifting city spending from LAPD to social services. During the campaign, DSA-LA censured Raman for accepting an endorsement from Democrats for Israel Los Angeles. DSA-LA maintained its endorsement of her reelection campaign. Raman won re-election in the nonpartisan primary with 32,562 votes (50.7%). Jurado won the top-two runoff with 46,007 votes (57.17%).

In the 2026 elections, DSA-LA ran a municipal slate under the "Shake Up LA" banner. In February, Raman launched a surprise mayoral campaign against incumbent Karen Bass. After considering whether to endorse Raman or fellow DSA member Rae Huang, DSA-LA voted not to endorse in the mayoral race. However, DSA-LA recommended voting for Nithya Raman in their primary voter guide. In the mayoral campaign, the Los Angeles Police Protective League spent heavily against Raman. Pro-Israel political groups strongly opposed Raman's campaign, which they saw as anti-Israel. In an interview with Hasan Piker, Raman said that Israel had committed genocide in Gaza. DSA-LA members have voted to endorse a slate of candidates for the November 3, 2026 election.

=== Nearby municipalities ===
==== Burbank ====
In 2020, DSA-LA endorsed Konstantine Anthony for the Burbank City Council. In the election for two seats, Anthony won, placing 1st with 17,529 votes (20.4%). In 2024, DSA-LA re-endorsed Anthony and endorsed challenger Mike Van Gorder. In the election for two seats, Anthony won, placing 1st with 18,694 votes (23.4%), and Van Gorder lost, placing 4th with 8,843 votes (11.1%).

In 2026, DSA-LA again endorsed Mike Van Gorder, along with Nolan Southerland. Southerland and Van Gorder both won with a platform of "rent stabilization, strong tenant protections, and the removal of Flock cameras," resulting in the first socialist-majority city council on the West Coast.

==== La Puente ====
In 2022, DSA-LA endorsed Ricardo Martinez for the La Puente City Council. Martinez ran a progressive campaign focused on workers' rights. Martinez lost, placing third in a two-seat election with 1,853 votes, behind incumbents Valerie Muñoz and Charlie Klinakis.

==== West Hollywood ====
In 2026, DSA-LA endorsed Stephen Post for the West Hollywood City Council. Post won one of three open seats, on a platform of adding bicycle lanes, building more housing, and opposing Flock cameras.

=== Other elected offices ===
In the 2020 California State Assembly election for AD-64, DSA-LA endorsed Fatima Iqbal-Zubair against incumbent Mike Gipson. Both Iqbal-Zubair and Gipson ran as Democrats. Iqbal-Zubair lost the general election with 56,875 votes (40.5%). In 2022, DSA-LA again endorsed Iqbal-Zubair, who lost again with 26,719 votes (38.3%).

In the 2021 special election for SD-30, DSA-LA endorsed Culver City mayor Daniel Lee against Sydney Kamlager, citing his support for California-wide Medicare For All. Both Lee and Kamlager ran as Democrats. Lee lost the top-two partisan primary, coming second with 9,458 votes (13.4%).

=== Ballot measures ===
In 2017, DSA-LA canvassed in support of Los Angeles County Measure H, a sales-tax measure to fund homeless services, and in opposition to Los Angeles Measure S, an anti-development ballot initiative backed by the AIDS Healthcare Foundation.

In 2020, Proposition 15, which would have partially reversed 1978 Prop 13 and raised property taxes on large commercial properties to fund public schools and community colleges, was endorsed by many DSA chapters. Endorsing chapters included DSA-LA, East Bay DSA, Inland Empire DSA, and San Francisco DSA. Prop 15 failed with 8,213,054 votes (48.0%). The cross-chapter effort to pass Prop 15 yielded a statewide DSA organization, California DSA.

In 2022, DSA-LA endorsed and canvassed for Measure ULA, a "mansion tax" that funded affordable housing and tenant assistance. Measure ULA won with 512,808 votes (57.8%).

== Other campaigns ==
=== Healthcare ===
In February 2025, DSA-LA helped organize protests outside Children's Hospital Los Angeles after the hospital paused gender-affirming care for most patients under 19.

=== Housing ===
In 2018, DSA-LA organized alongside Burlington Arcade tenants and brought their protest to the home of City Council member Mitch O'Farrell.

In 2022, Street Watch L.A. (SWLA), an anti-gentrification group founded by DSA-LA and the Los Angeles Community Action Network, organized protests against the opening of the high-end Dunsmoor restaurant in Glassell Park.

In 2025, with inspiration from Zohran Mamdani, DSA-LA pushed for new limits on rent increases and other reforms in the city's rent-stabilized apartments.

=== Immigration ===
In March 2017, DSA-LA members protested outside Mayor Eric Garcetti's reelection-night event, demanding that Los Angeles take a harder line against deportation and adopt a stronger sanctuary-city stance.

In April 2026, DSA-LA hosted an panel titled "ICE Out of Our Cities" with DSA elected officials, who spoke about how to prevent Trump's "white nationalist, patriarchal, MAGA, fascist project" and oppose ICE deportations.

=== Labor ===
In 1989, DSA-LA members supported striking Catholic cemetery workers during a unionization drive, who later voted to unionize. In 1991, the workers voted 92-43 to disband the union.

In 2019, during the 2019 United Teachers Los Angeles strike, DSA-LA launched the Tacos for Teachers solidarity effort and mobilized hundreds of members onto picket lines.

In 2023, during the UAW's "Stand Up strike", DSA-LA members joined picket lines in Rancho Cucamonga and Ontario. DSA-LA members also gave tacos to strikers.

Since 2023, DSA-LA has supported organizing and strike activity among Starbucks Workers United (SBWU) baristas. In late 2025, Los Angeles baristas had joined SWBU's "Red Cup Rebellion" strike wave. Picket line baristas were being supported nationally by DSA chapters, including DSA-LA.

=== Palestine ===
In October 2023, as the War in Gaza began, DSA-LA declared its "solidarity with Palestine". This became a flashpoint in Los Angeles politics, with Raman's opponent Ethan Weaver calling on her to reject DSA-LA's endorsement. LA mayor Karen Bass described the statement as "antisemitic", "reprehensible, disgusting, and dangerous". In 2024, DSA-LA and its endorsees supported a municipal ceasefire resolution on the LA City Council, which was unsuccessful. DSA-LA has supported local pro-Palestinian protests. In March 2024, DSA-LA organizers rallied with IfNotNow Los Angeles and several unions to organize a "Not Another Bomb" rally on the steps of City Hall. In 2025, the Jewish Journal of Greater Los Angeles argued that DSA-LA supported "hate and violence aimed at Jews", noting that DSA-LA had condemned Israel and opposed US weapon shipments to Israel.

== Election results ==
DSA-LA has endorsed candidates in statewide, state legislature, and local elections, but not in federal elections to Congress.

=== United States House of Representatives ===
Year	Name	Office	Stage	Votes	%	Result	DSA	Notes	Ref
2026	Angela Gonzales-Torres	CA-34	General	TBD	TBD	TBD	member, endorsee		
2026	Angela Gonzales-Torres	CA-34	Primary	36,708	30.7%	Advanced	member; not endorsed, but recommended by voting guide		

=== Statewide ===
Year	Name	Office	Stage	Votes	%	Result	DSA	Notes	Ref
2026	Sam Sukaton	Board of Equalization (District 3)	General	TBD	TBD	TBD	member; not endorsed		
2026	Sam Sukaton	Board of Equalization (District 3)	Primary	335,304	18.2%	Advanced	member; not endorsed, but recommended by voting guide		
2018	Gayle McLaughlin	Lieutenant Governor	Primary	263,364	4.0%	Lost	endorsee		

=== State legislature ===
Year	Name	Office	District	Stage	Votes	%	Result	DSA	Notes	Ref
2022	Fatima Iqbal-Zubair	Assembly	AD-65	General	26,719	38.3%	Lost	member, endorsee		
2022	Fatima Iqbal-Zubair	Assembly	AD-65	Primary	13,162	31.1%	Advanced	member, endorsee	2nd of 3; advanced to general	
2021	Daniel Lee	Senate	SD-30	Primary	9,458	13.4%	Lost	member, endorsee	special election to succeed Holly Mitchell	
2020	Fatima Iqbal-Zubair	Assembly	AD-64	General	56,875	40.5%	Lost	member, endorsee	endorsed in general	
2020	Fatima Iqbal-Zubair	Assembly	AD-64	Primary	18,469	32.52%	Advanced	member	2nd of 2; advanced to general	
2020	Godfrey Santos Plata	Assembly	AD-53	General	49,580	43.7%	Lost	member		
2020	Godfrey Santos Plata	Assembly	AD-53	Primary	20,923	37.1%	Advanced	member	2nd of 2; advanced to general	
2018	Steve Dunwoody	Assembly	AD-54	Primary	6,409	8.5%	Lost	endorsee	write-in candidate	

=== Local executive ===
Year	Name	Area	Office	District	Stage	Votes	%	Result	DSA	Notes	Ref
2026	Nithya Raman	Los Angeles	Mayor	At-large	General	TBD	TBD	TBD	member, endorsee		
2026	Marissa Roy	Los Angeles	City Attorney	At-Large	General	TBD	TBD	TBD	member, endorsee		
2026	Nithya Raman	Los Angeles	Mayor	At-large	Primary	247,781	29.0%	Advanced	member	not endorsed, but recommended by voter guide	
2026	Rae Huang	Los Angeles	Mayor	At-large	Primary	25,220	3.0%	Lost	member	not endorsed	
2026	Marissa Roy	Los Angeles	City Attorney	At-Large	Primary	320,747	43.1%	Won	member, endorsee		

=== Local legislature ===
Year	Name	Area	Office	District	Stage	Votes	%	Result	DSA	Notes	Ref
2026	Estuardo Mazariegos	Los Angeles	Council	CD-9	General	TBD	TBD	TBD	endorsee		
2026	Nolan Southerland	Burbank	Council	At-large	General	TBD	TBD	TBD	member, endorsee		
2026	Mike Van Gorder	Burbank	Council	At-large	General	TBD	TBD	TBD	member, endorsee		
2026	Stephen Post	West Hollywood	Council	At-large	General	TBD	TBD	TBD	endorsee		
2026	Anthony Bryson	Long Beach	Council	District 1	Primary	1,300	17.75%	Lost	member	not endorsed by DSA-LA, but recommended in voter guide; endorsed by DSA Long Beach	
2026	Eunisses Hernandez	Los Angeles	Council	CD-1	Primary	21,712	57.69%	Won	member, endorsee		
2026	Henry Mantel	Los Angeles	Council	CD-5	Primary	18,022	25.59%	Lost	member	not endorsed	
2026	Estuardo Mazariegos	Los Angeles	Council	CD-9	Primary	5,340	26.25%	Advanced	endorsee		
2026	Faizah Malik	Los Angeles	Council	CD-11	Primary	34,3123	39.77%	Lost	endorsee		
2026	Hugo Soto-Martinez	Los Angeles	Council	CD-13	Primary	38,748	68.5%	Won	member, endorsee		
2024	Konstantine Anthony	LA County	Supervisor	District 5	Primary	39,801	11.42%	Lost	member	3rd of 5	
2024	Mike Van Gorder	Burbank	Council	At-large	General	8,843	11.1%	Lost	member, endorsee	4th of 4; 2 seats available	
2024	Konstantine Anthony	Burbank	Council	At-large	General	18,694	23.4%	Won	member, endorsee	1st of 4; 2 seats available	
2024	Jillian Burgos	Los Angeles	Council	CD-2	General	38,185	46.2%	Lost	member, endorsee		
2024	Nithya Raman	Los Angeles	Council	CD-4	Primary	32,562	50.7%	Won	member, endorsee	Won outright; no general election	
2024	Ysabel Jurado	Los Angeles	Council	CD-14	General	46,007	57.2%	Won	member, endorsee		
2024	Ysabel Jurado	Los Angeles	Council	CD-14	Primary	8,618	24.5%	Advanced	member, endorsee	1st of 8; advanced to general	
2022	Ricardo Martinez	La Puente	Council	At-large	General	1,853	20.82%	Lost	endorsee	3rd of 4; 2 seats available	
2022	Eunisses Hernandez	Los Angeles	Council	CD-1	Primary	16,108	53.9%	Won	member, endorsee	Won outright; no general election	
2022	Hugo Soto-Martinez	Los Angeles	Council	CD-13	General	38,069	57.8%	Won	member, endorsee		
2022	Hugo Soto-Martinez	Los Angeles	Council	CD-13	Primary	19,196	40.6%	Advanced	member, endorsee	1st of 5; advanced to general	
2022	Bryant Odega	Los Angeles	Council	CD-15	Primary	4,137	15.76%	Lost	member	4th of 4; not endorsed	
2020	Konstantine Anthony	Burbank	Council	At-large	General	17,529	20.4%	Won	member, endorsee	1st of 4; 2 seats available	
2020	Nithya Raman	Los Angeles	Council	CD-4	General	70,317	52.9%	Won	member, endorsee		
2020	Nithya Raman	Los Angeles	Council	CD-4	Primary	31,502	40.8%	Advanced	member, endorsee	2nd of 3; advanced to general	

=== Other local seats ===
Year	Name	Area	Office	District	Stage	Votes	%	Result	DSA	Notes	Ref
2026	Yaritza González	IUSD	Board of Ed	Area 3	General	TBD	TBD	TBD	member, endorsee		
2026	Estefany Castañeda	CVUHSD	Board of Ed	Area 5	General	TBD	TBD	TBD	endorsee		
2026	Rocío Rivas	LAUSD	Board of Ed	District 2	Primary	64,424	64.36%	Won	endorsee		
2024	Karla Griego	LAUSD	Board of Ed	District 5	General	99,930	61.0%	Won	endorsee		
2024	Karla Griego	LAUSD	Board of Ed	District 5	Primary	24,065	36.7%	Advanced	endorsee	1st of 4; advanced to general	
2024	Kahllid Al-Alim	LAUSD	Board of Ed	District 1	Primary	16,382	20.1%	Advanced	endorsee	2nd of 7; advanced to general; un-endorsed for general	
2022	Estefany Castañeda	CVUHSD	Board of Ed	Area 5	General	9,705	61.57%	Won	endorsee		
2022	Rocío Rivas	LAUSD	Board of Ed	District 2	General	55,230	52.5%	Won	endorsee		

== Local conventions ==
#	Date	Location	Notes	Voter guide
9	18 July 2026	TBD	Invite	Primary; 2026 Primary "Shake Up LA" slate; 2026 General "Shake Up LA" slate
8	13 April 2025	UAW Region 6 Hall	State of DSA-LA; Proposals	
7	20 April 2024	UAW Region 6 Hall	State of the Chapter; Proposals	Primary; General
6	22 April 2023	Los Angeles City College	Landing	
5	16 July 2022	Los Angeles Trade Technical College	State of the Chapter; Landing; Proposals	Primary; General
4	16 October 2021	online (Zoom)	Remote due to COVID-19.: Landing; Proposals; Bulletin #1	
3	12 September 2020	online (Zoom)	Remote due to COVID-19.: State of the Chapter; Landing; Proposals & statements	Primary; General
2	19 October 2019	Immanuel Presbyterian Church	Convention review; Convention Proposals; Minutes	
1	28 April 2018	Friendship Auditorium	Over 200 attendees.: Convention review; Proposals & results; Caucus guides	Primary; General

== See also ==
- Young Democratic Socialists of America
- Democratic Socialists of America chapters:
  - Atlanta Democratic Socialists of America
  - Chicago Democratic Socialists of America
  - Metro DC Democratic Socialists of America
  - New York City Democratic Socialists of America
  - Portland Democratic Socialists of America
  - Seattle Democratic Socialists of America
- DSA members:
  - List of Democratic Socialists of America public officeholders
  - Category:Members of the Democratic Socialists of America
- History of socialism in the United States:
  - Socialism in the United States
  - American Left
