= Young Democratic Socialists of America =

US political organization

- YDSA logo since 2017
- Co-chairs: Mae Bracelin; James Hernández
- Founded: March 20, 1982; 44 years ago
- Membership: ▲2,735
- Ideology: Democratic socialism; Socialism (multi-tendency)
- Position: Left-wing
- Colours: Red
- National affiliation: Democratic Socialists of America
- Newspaper: The Activist
- Website: y.dsausa.org

The Young Democratic Socialists of America (YDSA) is the youth and student section of the Democratic Socialists of America (DSA). As of April 2026, YDSA had 2,735 members; its largest chapter was at the University of Maryland, College Park, with 109 members. As of October 2026, it had 167 chapters at high schools, community colleges, and universities across the United States. In 2022, The Nation described YDSA as the "largest student-led socialist organization in the country".

The organization was founded in 1982 as the Democratic Socialists of America Youth Section. It changed its name to Young Democratic Socialists (YDS) in 1997 and adopted its current name in 2017.

== History ==
YDS logo until 2017

=== 1980–2000: Formation and early history ===
In 1980, Democratic Left reported that the Youth Section of the Democratic Socialist Organizing Committee (DSOC) had grown from 600 to nearly 1,200 members and from 15 to more than 30 chapters over the previous year. Following the merger of DSOC and the New American Movement in 1982, DSOC's youth section continued as the Democratic Socialists of America Youth Section. In the 1980s, the Youth Section organized as part of the anti-apartheid movement and against United States intervention in Central America. New York University archival records list DSA Youth Section and YDS files concerning anti-apartheid protests, Nicaraguan student tours and exchanges, and Central America/Southern Africa solidarity work.

During the 1990s, as DSA community chapters declined in activity, the Youth Section became one of the organization's main centers of activity. Student chapters focused on labor organizing, opposition to the North American Free Trade Agreement, protests against the World Trade Organization, and involvement in the AFL-CIO's Union Summer in 1996. During this period, tensions between DSA and the Youth Section contributed to the Youth Section adopting the name Young Democratic Socialists (YDS) and developing a more distinct identity. Some YDS chapters also took part in student anti-sweatshop organizing; at Arizona State University, YDS members campaigned against the university's Adidas apparel contract and pushed the university to join the Worker Rights Consortium. Around 2000 and 2001, YDS members took part in the "Not With Our Money" campaign, a student campaign connected to the Prison Moratorium Project that opposed campus contracts with Sodexho Marriott because of parent company Sodexho Alliance's investments in private prison companies. YDS activity in the campaign included support for a December 2000 student occupation at Ithaca College and a campaign against Sodexho Marriott's food-service contract at Arizona State University.

=== 2001–2015: Organizational decline, antiwar activism, and student debt ===
During the early 2000s, membership in both DSA and YDS declined further. According to a history published by the DSA Fund, divisions over Ralph Nader's 2000 Green Party presidential campaign, the response to the September 11 attacks, and the war in Afghanistan contributed to the decline; the history also says YDS leaders opposed Nader's campaign more strongly than some members did. The debate over Nader and third-party politics continued into 2004, when Democratic Left devoted its spring issue to "Kerry or Nader". David Duhalde, who served as DSA's national youth organizer from 2006 to 2008, later wrote that YDS had reached its "lowest point" during this period, with "maybe five chapters" across the United States. YDS leadership sought to stabilize the organization by narrowing its national priorities and focusing on local campus campaigns at schools with little existing socialist presence. Duhalde later wrote that the organization often avoided campuses where larger socialist groups, especially the International Socialist Organization, were already active.

YDS was active in antiwar organizing during the United States invasion of Afghanistan and the Iraq War. In 2004, YDS participated in the "Books Not Bombs" day of action against the Bush administration's war policies, military recruitment, civil-liberties restrictions, and university ties to the Pentagon and private weapons manufacturers. The same year, YDS organizers described their goal as building an anti-Bush current through voter registration, issue education, and a Summer Activist Institute in New York City. YDS also took part in coalition antiwar events, including the United for Peace and Justice march against the Iraq War in Washington, D.C., on January 27, 2007.

YDS also took part in labor and student-debt campaigns. It supported the Coalition of Immokalee Workers in its effort to raise agricultural workers' wages by pressuring fast-food corporations with college outlets. After Occupy Wall Street, DSA and YDS began to campaign for canceling student debt. In 2013, YDS adopted anti-student-debt organizing and opposition to tuition increases as part of its activist agenda; the same year, YDS reported having 15 chapters and allied campus groups, four new organizing committees, and around 150–200 activists. The same year, The Nation reported that Kent State University YDS was organizing with other student groups against tuition hikes and fees. In 2014, DSA reported that YDS chapters were taking part in the Drop Student Debt campaign, including chapters at William Paterson University and the University of Alabama.

=== 2016–2021: Sanders campaigns, COVID-19 pandemic, and student-worker organizing ===
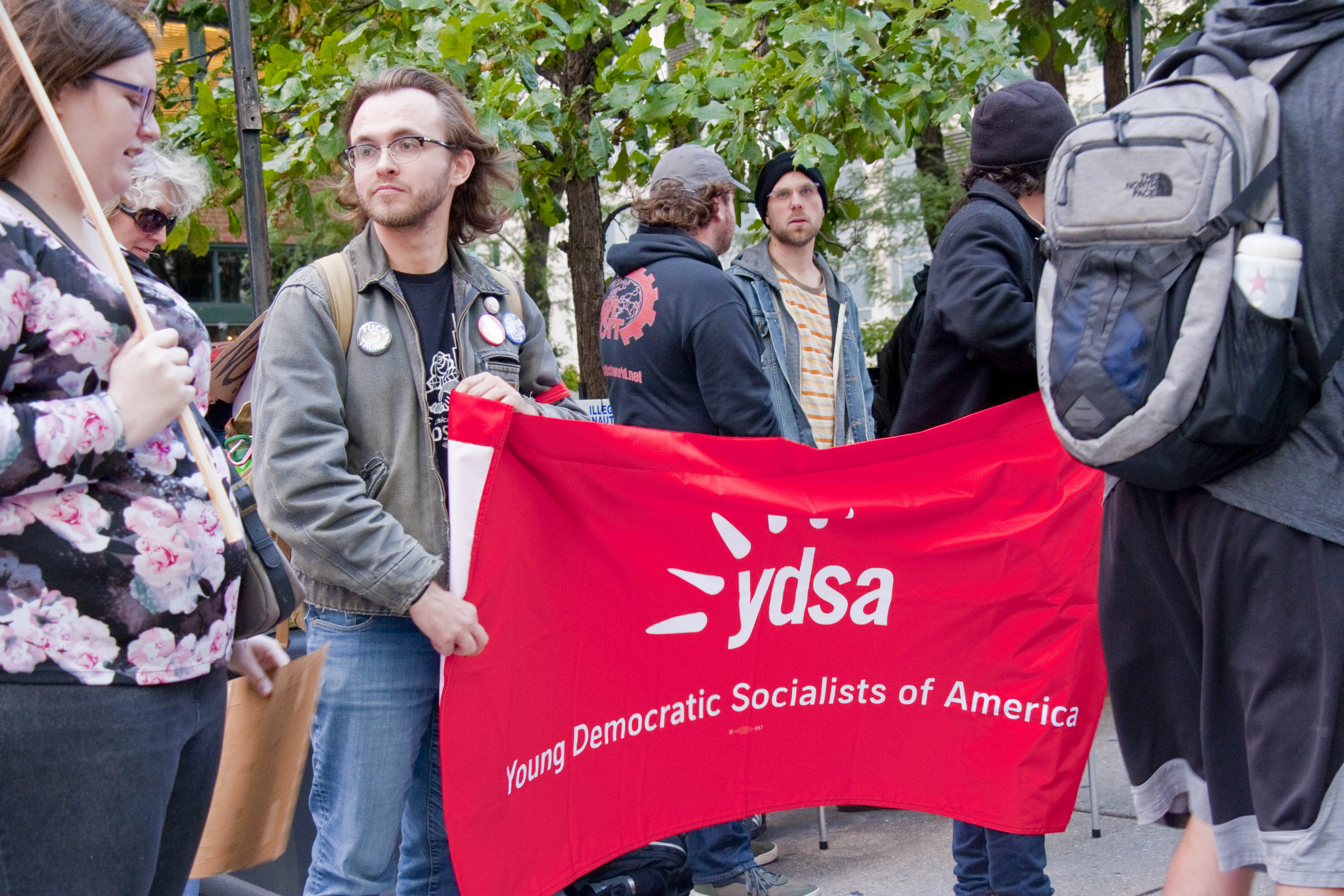
YDSA banner at a protest against Brett Kavanaugh in Chicago, 2018

The organization, like DSA, grew rapidly after the Bernie Sanders 2016 presidential campaign and the election of Donald Trump in 2016. In October 2017, Vice News reported that the organization had grown from 12 chapters at the end of 2016 to 47 chapters by June 2017, with at least 100 chapters expected by the end of the fall semester. At the organization's 2017 conference, delegates voted to change its name from Young Democratic Socialists to Young Democratic Socialists of America (YDSA), reflecting a closer relationship with DSA.

As YDSA grew, members sought to coordinate chapter work through national priorities. In 2017–2018, YDSA adopted DSA's national priorities of Medicare for All, labor work, and electoral work. In 2018–2019, it adopted College for All as a single national campaign. In 2019–2020, YDSA adopted several national committees and priority campaigns, including College for All, Medicare for All, the Green New Deal, labor work, political education, and YDSA for Bernie. During the Bernie Sanders 2020 presidential campaign, YDSA organized through its YDSA for Bernie campaign. After Sanders dropped out of the 2020 Democratic Party presidential primaries, many Students for Bernie chapters transitioned into YDSA chapters.

During the COVID-19 pandemic, the National Coordinating Committee voted to replace other priorities with the Student & Workers' Recovery campaign, which called for economic relief for students and workers, student-debt cancellation, rent cancellation, universal health care, and opposition to police violence. In 2020, YDSA members at Kenyon College helped form the Kenyon Student Worker Organizing Committee, an undergraduate student-worker union drive.In December 2020, Teen Vogue reported that the Columbia-Barnard YDSA chapter had organized a petition with more than 3,200 signers in support of a tuition strike at Columbia University.

=== 2022–present: Palestine solidarity, student labor, and campus campaigns ===
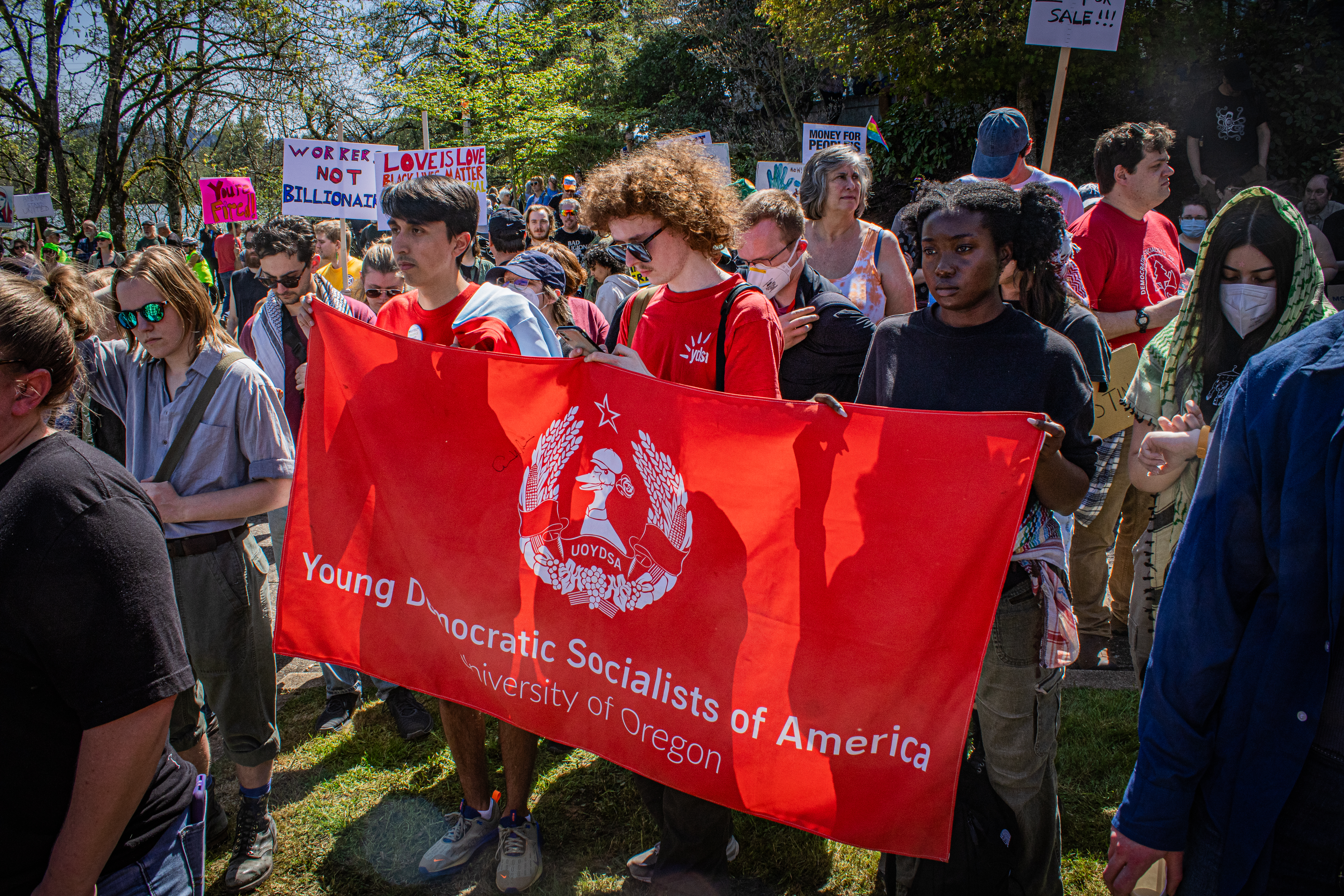
University of Oregon YDSA banner at protest against DOGE in Eugene, Oregon, 2025

In October 2022, YDSA and the Graduate Student Action Network co-organized a national day of action for reproductive justice, with events at more than 50 universities in 28 states. At New York University, Washington Square News reported that the university began fully covering elective abortions in its student health insurance plan in fall 2023 after a campaign by NYU YDSA and the Young Democratic Socialist Labor Club. In 2024, following a campaign proposal passed at the 2023 YDSA National Convention, YDSA launched Trans Rights and Abortion—Never Surrender! (TRANS), a national campaign focused on transgender rights, abortion access, and contraceptive access. YDSA said that 40 chapters participated in the campaign's March 28 day of action.

A 2023 Jacobin article described student-worker organizing as a growing focus for YDSA organizers. In 2022, YDSA also developed Red Hot Summer, a labor-organizing training program; Jacobin reported that the program trained hundreds of young workers and helped launch union drives representing thousands of workers. In 2023, the University of Oregon chapter of YDSA helped organize undergraduate student workers as UO Student Workers. In 2025, the union went on strike and won its first contract, which The Nation described as the first contract covering every undergraduate worker at a public university.

YDSA members and chapters participated in Palestine solidarity encampments in spring 2024, including at New York University, the University of Wisconsin–Madison, Columbia University, San Francisco State University, the University of Florida, and the University of Oregon. After the encampments largely ended, YDSA's 2024 convention emphasized Palestinian liberation, divestment from Israel, and student strikes as organizing tactics.

In 2025, YDSA adopted a national campaign focused on establishing "sanctuary campuses", a concept similar to sanctuary cities, to limit university cooperation with immigration authorities and protect immigrant and international students. Campus and local media reported YDSA-backed sanctuary-campus campaigns or petition drives at schools including Arizona State University, Texas State University, the University of Texas Rio Grande Valley, Colorado State University, Loyola University Chicago, DePaul University, the University of Cincinnati, Millersville University, the University of California, Santa Barbara, and the University of Florida.

In November 2025, NOTUS reported that YDSA had grown rapidly in recent months, with chapter leaders attributing the growth to Donald Trump's reelection and the success of Zohran Mamdani's mayoral campaign in New York City.

== Organization ==
YDSA chapters and members participate in political education, labor organizing, electoral work, and issue-based campaigns. The organization is run by the YDSA National Coordinating Committee (NCC), which consists of two co-chairs and seven at-large members. YDSA's co-chairs are also voting members of DSA's national leadership, the National Political Committee, and act as representatives of the youth section.

Each year at a summer convention, elected delegates vote on resolutions, committees, national priorities, policies, campaigns, and national leadership. YDSA also holds a winter conference focused on outreach, workshops, and networking. Past conferences have included speakers such as Irving Howe, José La Luz, Ruth Messinger, Noam Chomsky, Cornel West, Barbara Ehrenreich, Gayatri Spivak, and Frances Fox Piven. At YDSA's February 2026 winter conference, "Rooted in Struggle," which drew more than 400 attendees, the organization emphasized student-worker organizing, campus opposition to ICE, and preparation for May Day 2028.

In 2019, the YDSA National Convention voted to revive The Activist as the organization's official publication, describing it as a forum for chapter reports, political commentary, and debate among members. In 2023, The Activist editorial board revived The Red Letter, an internal newsletter with updates from the National Coordinating Committee, chapter highlights, and writing pitches.

== Notable current and former members ==
- Amber A'Lee Frost, writer, author, and co-host of Chapo Trap House
- Bhaskar Sunkara, founder of Jacobin and president of The Nation
- Maria Svart, former national director of the Democratic Socialists of America
- David Duhalde, former deputy director of the Democratic Socialists of America and former political director of Our Revolution
- Peter Frase, sociologist, author, and founding editor of Jacobin
- Marek Broderick, member of the Burlington City Council (2024–present) and former co-chair of the University of Vermont YDSA chapter
- Cecilia Lunaparra, member of the Berkeley City Council (2024–present) and member of UC-Berkeley YDSA
- Hannah Shvets, member of the Ithaca Common Council (2025–present) and member of Cornell YDSA
- Adrian Stancil-Martin, member of the Appleton Common Council (2025-present) and member of Lawrence University YDSA

== See also ==
- Democratic Socialists of America chapters:
  - Chicago Democratic Socialists of America
  - Los Angeles Democratic Socialists of America
  - Metro DC Democratic Socialists of America
  - New York City Democratic Socialists of America
  - Seattle Democratic Socialists of America
  - Twin Cities Democratic Socialists of America
- DSA members:
  - List of Democratic Socialists of America public officeholders
  - Category:Members of the Democratic Socialists of America
- History of socialism in the United States:
  - Socialism in the United States
  - American Left
