= Maria Svart =

American activist

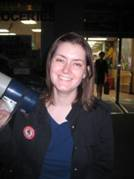

National Director of the Democratic Socialists of America
- In office June 2011 – February 2024
- Preceded by: Frank Llewellyn
- Succeeded by: Vacant

Personal details
- Born: Portland, Oregon, U.S.
- Education: University of Chicago

Maria L. Svart is an American activist and former National Director of Democratic Socialists of America, the largest socialist organization in the United States. She was National Director from June 2011 when she succeeded Frank Llewellyn, who had himself served for a decade, until February 2024 one month after she tendered her resignation to DSA's National Political Committee.

== Early life and education ==
Svart was born and raised in Portland, Oregon, where she attended Lincoln High School. She then attended the University of Chicago, where she became a member of the university's Young Democratic Socialists of America chapter. She served as the feminist issues coordinator on the YDSA Coordinating Committee and later as co-chair. Her campus activism, through YDSA and other student organizations, focused on feminist, environmental, immigrant rights, anti-war and labor solidarity work.

== Career ==
After college, Svart became a campus organizer with the Massachusetts Public Interest Research Group, while simultaneously helping successive YDSA organizers and leaders begin to bridge the generational gap between YDSA and DSA. Svart then worked for seven years with the Service Employees International Union and the Committee of Interns & Residents/SEIU Healthcare. At CIR, she organized resident physicians to speak out in support of Medicaid and funding for safety net hospitals.

She served as chair of the New York City DSA local and was elected to the National Political Committee at the 2009 DSA convention. On the NPC, Svart has chaired the Program Committee, which has provided materials and guidance that have helped DSA locals and YDS chapters participate in the fight against state and federal budget cuts and to defend the rights of public employees. Throughout involvement in DSA, Maria has stressed the importance of understanding how patriarchy, racism, and other structures of oppression intersect with capitalism; the need to train more activists in the skills necessary to intervene effectively in politics; and the "crucial role of both public and internal socialist education in the building of our movement".

In February 2011 Svart was hired by DSA's National Political Committee to succeed Frank Llewellyn as the National Director of the Democratic Socialists of America. She served in this position for nearly 13 years before tendering her resignation on January 16, 2024. Despite having intended to resign two months prior she extended her tenure as to not disrupt DSA's Palestine solidarity work following the October 7 attacks and the Israeli invasion of the Gaza Strip as the organization struggled to end the Biden-Harris administration's support for Israeli war crimes in the Gaza war. Her term saw DSA grow from 5,000 members to a height of 79,000, and fall to 52,000 at the time of her resignation as progressive organizations across the US hemorrhaged members during President Biden's term in office.

"Right now, the NPC is working on finalizing the 2024 budget. It will require very hard choices, and longer term, a reckoning with our structure and our definition of democracy. I’ve said before that DSA is both an army and a town hall. We must act together but also question each other. We can never resolve this fundamental structural contradiction, and it is why my main advice to DSA members is to face this truth. Accept that mass work means competing ideas, so seek ways to compromise with each other. Act responsibly and expect the same of your leaders. Most importantly, learn to act holistically and based on a hard analysis of real conditions. This becomes increasingly important as we head into an election year with stakes higher than ever.

We have everything to lose, but also everything to win. Let’s take ourselves as seriously as the moment requires."

— Maria Svart, "A Farewell from the National Director" (January 16, 2024)

== Personal life ==
Svart lives in Brooklyn, New York. Svart is biracial, and has Mexican ancestry.
