= Twin Cities Democratic Socialists of America =

- Abbreviation: TCDSA or Twin Cities DSA
- Governing body: Steering Committee
- Founded: 2017
- Headquarters: 2708 E Lake Street, Minneapolis
- Newspaper: Little Red Letter
- Membership (July 2026): ▲2,763
- Ideology: Democratic socialism; Socialism (multi-tendency)
- Political position: Left-wing
- National affiliation: Democratic Socialists of America
- Mayor of Minneapolis: 0 / 1 (Note: DSA does not have a ballot line of its own. DSA runs candidates on the ballot lines of other political parties. The vast majority of DSA members in elected office ran on the Democratic Party ballot line.)
- Minneapolis City Council: 4 / 13
- Mayor of Saint Paul: 0 / 1
- Saint Paul City Council: 2 / 7
- State House (Twin Cities): 2 / 82
- State Senate (Twin Cities): 2 / 41 (Note: Omar Fateh was endorsed by TCDSA in 2022 and 2026. Zaynab Mohamed was endorsed only in 2022.)
- Governor (MN): 0 / 1
- U.S. House (Twin Cities): 0 / 5
- U.S. Senate (MN): 0 / 2

Website
- twincitiesdsa.org

The Twin Cities Democratic Socialists of America (Twin Cities DSA or TCDSA) is the Twin Cities metropolitan area chapter of the Democratic Socialists of America. TCDSA is the 8th-largest DSA chapter, below Philadelphia DSA and above Seattle DSA.

Twin Cities DSA participates in electoral campaigns, labor organizing, tenant organizing, mutual aid, and protest mobilizations in and around Minneapolis and Saint Paul.

Notable TCDSA members include James Scheibel, Robin Wonsley, Jason Chavez, Aisha Chughtai, Omar Fateh, Samantha Sencer-Mura, Soren Stevenson, and Athena Hollins.

== Organization and structure ==
Twin Cities DSA is a volunteer dues-paying membership organization, where all dues-payers members have voting rights. TCDSA had under 100 members before 2016, about 1,500 members in 2021, and about 2,200 members in 2026.

TCDSA holds a local convention each year at which members set chapter priorities, endorse candidates, and elect the Steering Committee.

Unlike most political parties, Twin Cities DSA rarely runs candidates on its own exclusive ballot line. Instead, TCDSA usually acts "like a party" or a "party surrogate" by endorsing and canvassing for candidates it supports within the Democratic-Farmer-Labor Party (DFL). Robin Wonsley won on a "Democratic Socialist" ballot line in 2021, 2023, and 2025.

== History ==
=== Early history ===
The Democratic Socialists of America was founded in 1982. The organization remained relatively small in the Twin Cities. In 1990, DSA member James Scheibel won election to mayor of St. Paul. His 1990–1994 mayorship focused on homelessness. Before 2016, Twin Cities DSA was very small and not a significant political actor in the Twin Cities area.

=== Rise in influence ===
Twin Cities DSA grew dramatically after the 2016 Bernie Sanders presidential campaign, alongside DSA as a whole. In 2017, TCDSA was officially founded. Since then, TCDSA has become substantially more important to Twin Cities municipal politics.

In 2021, three DSA-endorsed candidates were elected to the Minneapolis City Council. Robin Wonsley was elected on a TCDSA ticket, defeating DFL and Green candidates. Jason Chavez and Aisha Chughtai were elected as DFLers. In 2023, a majority of seats on the Minneapolis City Council were won by TCDSA and Minneapolis for the Many, a local progressive organization. This put the city council in frequent conflict with the moderate mayor Jacob Frey.

In 2022, all six TCDSA endorsees won their races, including four state lawmakers.

In 2025, TCDSA endorsed four candidates for Minneapolis city council, including three incumbents, plus Soren Stevenson (who had lost in 2023), minus Aurin Chowdhury (who did not seek TCDSA endorsement). Fateh said: "People are hungry for authentic, progressive candidates who proudly stand with working people." TCDSA knocked over 50,000 doors. In the 2025 Minneapolis mayoral election, TCDSA endorsed Omar Fateh for Minneapolis mayor against incumbent Jacob Frey. All TCDSA incumbents won re-election, as did Soren Stevenson, while Fateh narrowly lost to Frey.

=== Other campaigns ===
During Operation Metro Surge, TCDSA organized ICE-watch, "know your rights" seminars, and mutual aid.

== Political positions ==
In its 2026 party platform, Twin Cities DSA said its mission was "unite workers into a powerful political movement to win the battle for democracy". Other major TCDSA goals for Minnesota include:

- Convert the Minnesota Legislature into a unicameral legislature with proportional representation
- Raise the state minimum wage to $20/hour, institute a 32-hour workweek
- Bringing Xcel Energy and Centerpoint Energy corporate facilities under municipal control
- Centralizing local control under city councils
- Phasing out armed policing and reallocating accountability for misconduct onto individual officers or institutions
- Abolish ICE and the Department of Homeland Security
- Nullifying the Treaty of Traverse des Sioux and returning as much Dakota land as possible

The 2023 TCDSA platform called for the passage of the Green New Deal, universal housing, and police reform. In October 2023, local DFL politicians criticized TCDSA as insensitive when it condemned Israel but not Hamas after the October 7 attacks. The group issued a follow up statement also condemning Hamas, while rejecting all bloodshed.

== Election results ==
=== State legislature ===
Year	Name	State	Office	District	Stage	Votes	%	Result	DSA	Notes	Ref
2026	Omar Fateh	MN	Senate	62	General	29,733	97.3%	Won	member, endorsee	Incumbent.	
2026	Omar Fateh	MN	Senate	62	Dem primary	12,827	78.3%	Advanced	member, endorsee	Incumbent.	
2026	Samantha Sencer-Mura	MN	House	63A	General	22,580	92.1%	Won	endorsee	Incumbent. Unopposed in Democratic primary.	
2026	Athena Hollins	MN	House	66B	General	10,962	83.5%	Won	endorsee	Incumbent. Unopposed in Democratic primary.	
2024	Athena Hollins	MN	House	66B	General	10,864	76.1%	Won	endorsee	Incumbent. Unopposed in Democratic primary.	
2024	Samantha Sencer-Mura	MN	House	63A	General	20,289	98.8%	Won	endorsee	Incumbent. Unopposed in Democratic primary.	
2022	Omar Fateh	MN	Senate	62	General	24,271	90.3%	Won	member, endorsee	Incumbent.	
2022	Omar Fateh	MN	Senate	62	Dem primary	7,416	60.7%	Advanced	member, endorsee	Incumbent.	
2022	Zaynab Mohamed	MN	Senate	63	General	39,063	85.6%	Won	endorsee		
2022	Zaynab Mohamed	MN	Senate	63	Dem primary	14,073	67.6%	Advanced	endorsee		
2022	Samantha Sencer-Mura	MN	House	63A	General	19,398	90.2%	Won	endorsee	Unopposed in Democratic primary.	
2022	Athena Hollins	MN	House	66B	General	8,640	78.4%	Won	endorsee	Incumbent. Unopposed in Democratic primary.	
2022	Fabian Bean	MN	House	63A	Dem primary	0	0%	Lost	endorsee	Withdrew. Replaced by Samantha Sencer-Mura.	
2022	Sheigh Freeberg	MN	Senate	65	Dem primary	1,672	22.6%	Lost	endorsee		
2020	Sonia Neculescu	MN	House	60A	Dem primary	792	17.2%	Lost	endorsee	Special election.	
2020	Omar Fateh	MN	Senate	62	General	33,103	89.0%	Won	member, endorsee		
2020	Omar Fateh	MN	Senate	62	Dem primary	11,109	54.9%	Advanced	member, endorsee		

=== Mayoral ===
Year	Name	Area	Office	District	Stage	Votes	%	Result	DSA	Notes	Ref
2025	Omar Fateh	Minneapolis	Mayor	At-large	General	65,377	47.2%	Lost	member, endorsee	Nonpartisan ranked-choice election. Came 2nd, votes from final round. Ran with Democratic-Farmer-Labor ballot label.	
2021	Sheila Nezhad	Minneapolis	Mayor	At-large	General	30,368	21.1%	Lost	endorsee	Nonpartisan ranked-choice election. Came 3rd, votes from 1st round. Ran with Democratic-Farmer-Labor ballot label.	

=== Local legislatures ===
Year	Name	Area	Office	District	Stage	Votes	%	Result	DSA	Notes	Ref
2026	Mai Chong Xiong	Ramsey County	County Commissioner	6	General	15,203	97.9%	Won	endorsee	Incumbent. Nonpartisan election. Unopposed in primary.	
2026	Mitchel Kulage	Hastings	City Council	At-large	General	2,266	15.73%	Lost	endorsee	Nonpartisan election.	
2025	Robin Wonsley	Minneapolis	City Council	2	General	3,825	59.8%	Won	endorsee	Incumbent. Ran on "Democratic Socialist" ballot line. Ranked-choice round 1.	
2025	Soren Stevenson	Minneapolis	City Council	8	General	6,685	56.3%	Won	endorsee	Ranked-choice round 1.	
2025	Jason Chavez	Minneapolis	City Council	9	General	6,089	77.4%	Won	endorsee	Incumbent. Ranked-choice round 1.	
2025	Aisha Chughtai	Minneapolis	City Council	10	General	6,358	58.8%	Won	endorsee	Incumbent. Ranked-choice round 1.	
2025	Cole Hanson	Saint Paul	City Council	4	General	1,124	17.5%	Lost	endorsee	special election Nonpartisan; ranked-choice first-choice votes.	
2023	Robin Wonsley	Minneapolis	City Council	2	General	1,381	67.6%	Won	endorsee	Incumbent. Ran on "Democratic Socialist" ballot line. Ranked-choice round 1.	
2023	Soren Stevenson	Minneapolis	City Council	8	General	3,856	49.8%	Lost	endorsee	Ranked-choice final round.	
2023	Jason Chavez	Minneapolis	City Council	9	General	3,407	78.9%	Won	endorsee	Incumbent. Ranked-choice round 1.	
2023	Aisha Chughtai	Minneapolis	City Council	10	General	3,828	60.7%	Won	endorsee	Incumbent. Ranked-choice round 1.	
2023	Aurin Chowdhury	Minneapolis	City Council	12	General	6,525	53.8%	Won	endorsee	Ranked-choice round 1.	
2023	Hwa Jeong Kim	Saint Paul	City Council	5	General	2,745	51.9%	Won	endorsee	Nonpartisan; ranked-choice round 1.	
2023	Nelsie Yang	Saint Paul	City Council	6	General	1,853	61.4%	Won	endorsee	Nonpartisan; ranked-choice round 1.	
2022	Mai Chong Xiong	Ramsey County	County Commissioner	6	General	7,993	50.2%	Won	endorsee	Nonpartisan election.	
2022	Mai Chong Xiong	Ramsey County	County Commissioner	6	Nonpartisan primary	2,372	39.7%	Advanced	endorsee	Nonpartisan election.	
2022	Aaron Wagner	Robbinsdale	City Council	4	General	809	56.38%	Won	endorsee	Nonpartisan election.	
2022	Aaron Wagner	Robbinsdale	City Council	4	Nonpartisan primary	245	42.39%	Advanced	endorsee	Nonpartisan election.	
2021	Robin Wonsley	Minneapolis	City Council	2	General	4,056	50.1%	Won	endorsee	Ran on "Democratic Socialist" ballot line. Came 1st in ranked-choice final round.	
2021	Jason Chavez	Minneapolis	City Council	9	General	3,792	56.9%	Won	endorsee	Ranked-choice round 1.	
2021	Aisha Chughtai	Minneapolis	City Council	10	General	5,360	59.9%	Won	member, endorsee	Came 1st in ranked-choice final round.	
2020	Yolanda Roth	Hennepin County	County Commissioner	1	Nonpartisan primary	0	0%	Lost	endorsee	Withdrew before election.	
2019	Nelsie Yang	Saint Paul	City Council	6	General	2,863	59.6%	Won	endorsee	Nonpartisan. Came 1st in ranked-choice final round.	
2018	Jennifer Nguyen-Moore	Ramsey County	County Commissioner	3	Nonpartisan primary	2,503	27.2%	Lost	endorsee		
2018	Brad McGarr	Shakopee	City Council	At-Large	General	1,238	5.08%	Lost	endorsee	Nonpartisan election.	
2017	Ginger Jentzen	Minneapolis	City Council	3	General	3,844	44.2%	Lost	endorsee	Member of Socialist Alternative. Ran on "Socialist Alternative" ballot line. Came 2nd in ranked-choice final round.	

=== Other local elections ===
Year	Name	Area	Office	District	Stage	Votes	%	Result	DSA	Notes	Ref
2026	Christin Crabtree	Minneapolis	School Board	At-large	General	90,184	36.9%	Won	endorsee	Nonpartisan; two seats elected.	
2026	Christin Crabtree	Minneapolis	School Board	At-large	Nonpartisan primary	49,254	38.6%	Advanced	endorsee	Nonpartisan; two seats elected.	
2025	Adam Schneider	Minneapolis	Park and Recreation Board	At-large	General	7,494	6.7%	Lost	endorsee	Nonpartisan; ranked-choice round 2, his last round with votes.	
2025	Michael Wilson	Minneapolis	Park and Recreation Board	At-large	General	19,978	20.2%	Lost	endorsee	Nonpartisan; ranked-choice final round.	

=== Ballot measures ===
Year	Measure	Area	Votes	%	Result	Notes	Ref
2026	Safe Homes Saint Paul	Saint Paul	92,045	79.0%	Won	Endorsed measure to allow renters' right to repair their apartments, with deductions from rent.	
2021	Question 2	Minneapolis	62,813	43.8%	Lost	Endorsed measure to replace Minneapolis Police Department with Minneapolis Department of Public Safety.	
2021	Question 3	Minneapolis	75,598	53.2%	Won	Endorsed measure to allow Minneapolis City Council to enact rent control.	

== See also ==
- List of chapters of the Democratic Socialists of America
- List of Democratic Socialists of America public officeholders
- Socialism in the United States and American Left
