= Chicago Democratic Socialists of America =

Chapter of the US political organization

- Abbreviation: Chicago DSA or CDSA
- Governing body: Steering Committee
- Headquarters: 3441 W Diversey Avenue, Chicago
- Membership (July 2026): ▲3,288
- Ideology: Democratic socialism; Socialism (multi-tendency)
- Political position: Left-wing
- National affiliation: Democratic Socialists of America
- City Council caucus: Chicago City Council Democratic Socialist Caucus
- Chicago City Council: 6 / 50 (Note: DSA does not have a ballot line of its own. DSA runs candidates on the ballot lines of other political parties. The vast majority of DSA members in elected office ran on the Democratic Party ballot line.)
- Citywide executive offices: 0 / 3
- State House (Chicago): 0 / 32
- State Senate (Chicago): 1 / 16
- U.S. House (Chicago): 0 / 8

Website
- chicagodsa.org

The Chicago Democratic Socialists of America (Chicago DSA or CDSA) is the Chicago local chapter of the Democratic Socialists of America (DSA). In the late 2010s and early 2020s, Chicago DSA became a significant force in city politics through Chicago City Council campaigns and the formation of a socialist caucus within the council.

In city elections, candidates associated with Chicago DSA have generally run on the Democratic Party ballot line.

== History ==
=== Origins and pre-2016 development ===
In 1982, the Democratic Socialists of America (DSA) formed as a merger of the Democratic Socialist Organizing Committee and the New American Movement, which had been headquartered in Chicago.

Chicago DSA has hosted the DSA National Convention in 1991, 2009, 2017, 2023, and 2025.

=== Post-Bernie growth ===
Chicago DSA grew as part of DSA's post-2016 expansion following Bernie Sanders' first presidential campaign and the election of Donald Trump. The 2017 DSA national convention in Chicago reflected this shift, rising from 120 to over 800 delegates, who were several times younger than the pre-Bernie DSA.

== Electoral campaigns ==
Unlike most political parties, Chicaco DSA does not have a ballot line. Instead, Chicago DSA acts "like a party" or a "party surrogate" by endorsing and canvassing for candidates it supports.

=== City Council ===
In the 2015 Chicago aldermanic election, Chicago DSA participated in city-level socialist electoral organizing around Jorge Mújica's aldermanic campaign. Although Mújica lost, this campaign prefigured later chapter electoral strategy. Carlos Ramirez-Rosa won his city council election and later joined Chicago DSA in 2017. Ramirez-Rosa was the youngest Chicago city councilor yet elected and its first democratic socialist.

In 2017, Illinois state Senator Daniel Biss, candidate for the 2018 Illinois gubernatorial election, selected Ramirez-Rosa to run for lieutenant governor on his ticket. Less than one week later, Ramirez-Rosa left the Biss campaign, because Ramirez-Rosa would not denounce Chicago DSA's support for the Boycott, Divestment, Sanctions (BDS) movement.

In the 2019 Chicago aldermanic election, six DSA members won or retained seats on the Chicago City Council, giving democratic socialists their largest bloc in the body in living memory. Chapter endorsements in 2019 also included Ugo Okere in the first round of the 40th Ward race; Okere was eliminated, and Chicago DSA endorsed Andre Vasquez in the runoff, which Vasquez won. These socialist alderpeople informally organized as a Socialist Caucus. On May 1, 2021, five members formally launched the Chicago City Council Democratic Socialist Caucus. The caucus has generally operated alongside the Chicago City Council Progressive Reform Caucus while pursuing a more explicitly socialist policy agenda.

In the 2023 Chicago aldermanic election, six Chicago DSA-endorsed candidates won election or re-election. Winners included incumbents Daniel La Spata, Jeanette Taylor, Byron Sigcho-Lopez, Rossana Rodriguez-Sanchez, and Carlos Ramirez-Rosa, along with challenger Angela Clay. Additional chapter-endorsed candidates, including Nick Ward and Ambria Taylor, were defeated.

In February 2025, Chicago mayor Brandon Johnson appointed Ramirez-Rosa as General Superintendent and CEO of the Chicago Park District. Johnson nominated Anthony Quezada, a DSA-endorsed member of the Cook County Board of Commissioners and former staffer of Ramirez-Rosa, to fill Ramirez-Rosa's seat. He was subsequently confirmed by a vote of the city council.

=== U.S. House of Representatives ===
In the 2026 U.S. House of Representatives elections in Illinois, Chicago DSA has endorsed and supported alderman Byron Sigcho-Lopez's independent campaign for the 4th district.

== Other campaigns ==
=== Labor organizing ===
During the 2019 Chicago Public Schools strike, Chicago DSA ran chapter-wide strike solidarity operations, including canvassing, picket-line support, and the "Bread for Ed" effort with Chicago Jobs with Justice to fund and distribute meals for students and strikers.

=== Tenant organizing ===
In 2018 and 2019, Chicago DSA participated in Lift the Ban's tenant campaign to repeal Illinois' rent-control preemption law through coalition work, precinct-level referendums, and neighborhood canvassing.

== See also ==
- Young Democratic Socialists of America
- Democratic Socialists of America chapters:
  - Los Angeles Democratic Socialists of America
  - Metro DC Democratic Socialists of America
  - New York City Democratic Socialists of America
  - Philadelphia Democratic Socialists of America
  - Seattle Democratic Socialists of America
  - Twin Cities Democratic Socialists of America
- DSA members:
  - List of Democratic Socialists of America public officeholders
  - Category:Members of the Democratic Socialists of America
- History of socialism in the United States:
  - Socialism in the United States
  - American Left
