= Portland Democratic Socialists of America =

Chapter of the US political organization

- Abbreviation: Portland DSA
- Founded: 1982
- Membership (Sept. 2026): ▲3,629
- Ideology: Democratic socialism Socialism (multi-tendency)
- Political position: Left-wing to far-left
- National affiliation: Democratic Socialists of America
- Portland City Council: 4 / 12 (Note: DSA does not have a ballot line of its own. DSA runs candidates on the ballot lines of other political parties. The vast majority of DSA members in elected office ran on the Democratic Party ballot line.)

Website
- https://portlanddsa.org/

Portland Democratic Socialists of America (Portland DSA) is the Portland, Oregon chapter of the Democratic Socialists of America (DSA). It is the largest DSA chapter in the Pacific Northwest and the fourth-largest DSA chapter nationwide behind NYC, LA, and DC. As of 2026, it holds a third of the seats on Portland City Council and roughly 1 in 200 city residents is a member. Portland DSA describes itself as an "organized working-class movement".
