= Seattle Democratic Socialists of America =

Chapter of the US political organization

- Abbreviation: Seattle DSA
- Membership (July 2026): ▲2,492
- Ideology: Democratic socialism; Socialism (multi-tendency)
- Political position: Left-wing
- National affiliation: Democratic Socialists of America
- Seattle City Council: 0 / 9 (Note: DSA does not have a ballot line of its own. DSA runs candidates on the ballot lines of other political parties in races where there is not an open nonpartisan blanket primary. The vast majority of DSA members in elected office ran on the Democratic Party ballot line.)
- Citywide executive offices: 0 / 2
- State House (Seattle): 1 / 10
- State Senate (Seattle): 0 / 5
- U.S. House (Seattle): 0 / 2

Website
- seattledsa.org

Seattle Democratic Socialists of America (Seattle DSA) is the Seattle chapter of the Democratic Socialists of America (DSA). Seattle DSA expanded during DSA's national post-2016 growth and has participated in Seattle protests, electoral campaigns, labor organizing, and housing campaigns.

== History ==
When the Democratic Socialists of America was formed by a merger of the New American Movement and the Democratic Socialist Organizing Committee in 1982, former's Rainier chapter merged with the latter's local organizing committee to form the Seattle chapter of the DSA. Seattle DSA was small before the 2016 Bernie Sanders presidential campaign. Seattle DSA grew alongside DSA's national post-2016 expansion and was active in Seattle municipal politics by 2017, including Seattle City Council election runs.

== Electoral campaigns ==
Unlike most political parties, Seattle DSA does not have a ballot line. Instead, Seattle DSA acts "like a party" or a "party surrogate" by endorsing and canvassing for candidates it supports.

=== Elected offices ===
In the nonpartisan 2017 Seattle mayoral election, Seattle DSA endorsed Nikkita Oliver, who ran on the "Seattle People's Party" ballot line and came 3rd in the top-two primary with 31,366 votes (17.27%). Oliver's local Seattle People's Party campaign was separate from the later national Movement for a People's Party effort. In the nonpartisan 2017 Seattle City Council election, Seattle DSA endorsed Jon Grant, a former Tenants Union of Washington State leader, for Position 8 (at-large). Grant placed 2nd in the top-two primary and lost in the general election with 68,441 votes (43.96%).

In the nonpartisan 2019 Seattle City Council election, member Tammy Morales ran for District 2. Morales had previously been a Seattle DSA member, but no longer identified as a socialist. Morales won the top-two primary and won the general election with 16,379 votes (60.47%). Seattle DSA member Shaun Scott, a former 2016 DNC delegate for Bernie Sanders, announced his campaign for District 4 in The Stranger and was endorsed by Seattle DSA as well as national DSA. Scott placed 2nd in the top-two primary and narrowly lost the general election with 15,568 votes (47.69%). Seattle DSA endorsed Kshama Sawant, a member of Socialist Alternative, in her successful re-election campaign.

In the partisan 2020 Washington House of Representatives election, Seattle DSA endorsed Sherae Lascelles for district 43 position 2. Lascelles' ballot ran on the "Seattle People's Party" ballot line. Lascelles placed 2nd in the top-two primary and lost the general election with 31,029 votes (33.4%).

In the nonpartisan 2021 Seattle City Council election, Seattle DSA endorsed Nikkita Oliver for Seattle City Council Position 9. Oliver placed 1st in the top-two primary and lost the general election, with 119,025 votes (45.99%). In the City Attorney election, Seattle DSA endorsed Nicole Thomas-Kennedy. Thomas-Kennedy placed 1st in the top-two primary and narrowly lost the general election with 122,947 votes (47.73%).

In the 2021 recall election for Kshama Sawant, Seattle DSA endorsed Sawant by a vote of 94% to 6% in December 2020. Sawant joined DSA in February 2021. Sawant narrowly won the recall by just 310 votes, or 0.76% of the 41,033 votes cast. Sawant left DSA in 2024.

In the 2022 US House elections, Seattle DSA endorsed Stephanie Gallardo for Washington's 9th congressional district. Gallardo placed 3rd in the top-two primary, with 22,531 votes (15.9%).

In the 2023 Seattle City Council election, Seattle DSA endorsed Matthew Mitnick. In March, ten former campaign members published a statement against Mitnick, leading Mitnick to withdraw in April.

In the partisan 2024 Washington House of Representatives election, Seattle DSA endorsed DSA member Shaun Scott for district 43 position 2. Scott ran on the Democratic ballot line. Scott placed 1st in the top-two primary and won the general with 49,990 votes (68.4%).

In 2025, Katie Wilson won the partisan Seattle mayoral election as a Democrat. Wilson is a self-described democratic socialist but is not a member of, and was not endorsed by, Seattle DSA.

In the upcoming 2026 Washington House of Representatives election, Seattle DSA re-endorsed Shaun Scott for the 43rd, and endorsed Jaelynn Scott for position 2 in the 37th legislative district.

=== Ballot initiatives ===
In the 2020s, Seattle DSA increasingly emphasized ballot campaigns, including Seattle social-housing measures and South King County wage initiatives.

Seattle DSA supported Initiative 135 to create the Seattle Social Housing Developer. I-135 passed in the February 14, 2023 special election with 57.09% of the vote. Proposition 1A then defeated Proposition 1B in the February 11, 2025 special election by 63.13% to 36.87%. Seattle DSA backed the 1A campaign.

Seattle DSA was a lead organizing group in the "Raise the Wage Renton" campaign, a ballot measure that sought to set the minimum wage at $20.29 for larger employers and $18.29 for smaller covered employers. The measure passed in the February 13, 2024 special election, with 58.04% in favor and 41.96% against, and increased Renton's minimum wage beginning July 1, 2024.

== Other campaigns ==
Seattle DSA has supported Starbucks Workers United and promoted local solidarity actions during Starbucks organizing drives and strikes. Seattle DSA also backed the unionization effort at Index Media in Seattle.

In February 2021, Seattle DSA joined labor and tenant-rights groups in a Renton protest that supported the union drive in Amazon's Bessemer warehouse and demanded stronger renter protections.

On January 27, 2024, protesters occupied US Representative Adam Smith's district office in Seattle during a Gaza ceasefire action. Smith released a statement claiming he had contacted Seattle DSA before and remained open to meeting afterward.

== See also ==
- Young Democratic Socialists of America
- Democratic Socialists of America chapters:
  - Chicago Democratic Socialists of America
  - Los Angeles Democratic Socialists of America
  - Metro DC Democratic Socialists of America
  - New York City Democratic Socialists of America
  - Portland Democratic Socialists of America
- DSA members:
  - List of Democratic Socialists of America public officeholders
  - Category:Members of the Democratic Socialists of America
- History of socialism in the United States:
  - Socialism in the United States
  - American Left
