= Mike Rotkin =

American academic and politician (1945–2025)

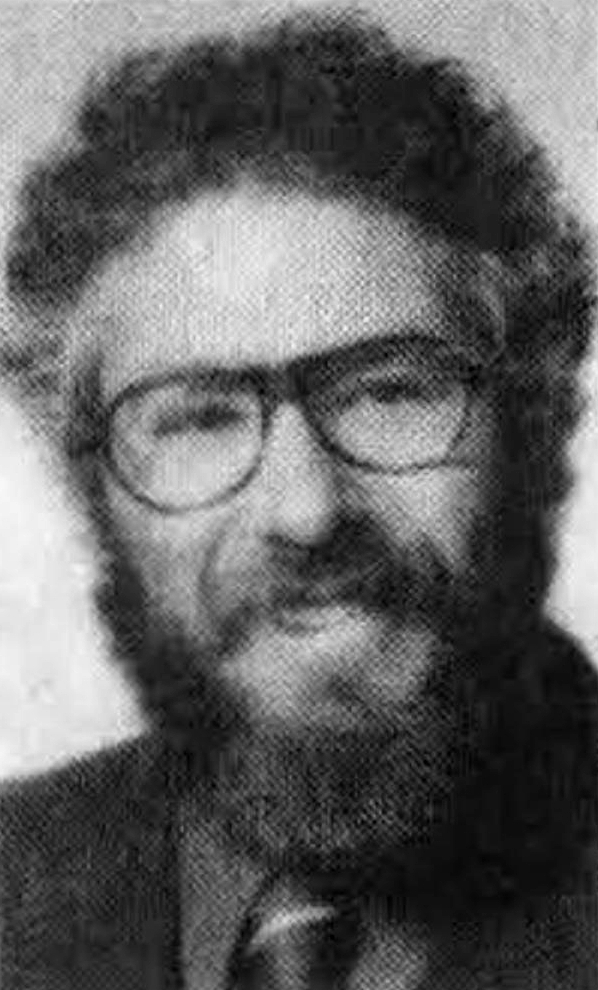
Rotkin c. 1982

Mike Rotkin (September 17, 1945 – June 18, 2025) was an American academic and politician who was a lecturer at the University of California, Santa Cruz, long-term city council member and a five-time mayor of Santa Cruz, California: 1981–1982, 1985–1986, 1995–1996, 2004–2005, and 2009–2010.

== Career ==
A former motorcycle mechanic with a Ph.D. in the History of Consciousness, Rotkin first ran for city council on a protest campaign as a "socialist-feminist" in 1979, taking first place among voters at a time when Santa Cruz was more Republican than Democrat. He was also a member of the Democratic Socialists of America. He taught Marxist theory at UC Santa Cruz for over 40 years, while serving six terms as a city councilman, including five terms as the mayor, longer than anyone in the city's history (the mayoral post of Santa Cruz passes yearly to a councilmember selected by a majority of other councilmembers). During his 20 years in city government, city spending on social services and programs increased from $80,000 ($200,000; 2000US) a year in 1979 to $2 million by 2000. However, in the 2006 election, he was criticized for supporting pragmatic pro-economic development positions.

He served as president of the University of California, Santa Cruz (UCSC) teachers' union.

== Anti-war and anti-racism activism ==
Rotkin protested the Vietnam War, Apartheid, and racism, and was arrested for civil disobedience "about a dozen times".

== Death ==
Rotkin died in Santa Cruz, California on June 18, 2025, at the age of 79. He died of leukemia.
