= List of Democratic Socialists of America public officeholders =

The Democratic Socialists of America (DSA) is a nonprofit political organization, and does not have a ballot line like most political parties. DSA members and endorsees usually run as members of the Democratic Party, and occasionally with the Green Party, Working Families Party, or as independents. Both national DSA and local DSA chapters can endorse candidates. DSA has no membership requirements; anyone can join DSA.

The list below contains 216 currently-elected individuals elected to public office who are endorsed by DSA National, endorsed by a DSA local chapter, or are members of DSA.

== History ==
In the 2017 elections, DSA members were elected to 15 state and local offices, for a total of 35 members in office.

In April 2018, 40 DSA members held elected office. In the 2018 midterm elections, DSA members Alexandria Ocasio-Cortez and Rashida Tlaib were elected to the United States House of Representatives. DSA endorsed 93 state and local candidates, of which 50 won their primaries, and 40 won their general election.

In 2019, 71 DSA members held office.

In the 2020 elections, DSA members Jamaal Bowman and Cori Bush were elected to the House and at least 36 DSA members won office, earning more than 3.1 million votes. In total, 101 DSAers held office. As a result, the list of socialists in Congress was longer than ever in US history and the number of socialist electeds was higher than any time since 1912, when the Socialist Party of America held over 1,000 offices.

In October 2022, DSA had elected over 120 candidates to local office.

In August 2023, DSA had "close to 160" endorsed politicians in office. In August 2023, DSA claimed that 207 DSA members held elected office, including state and local offices. In January 2024, DSA claimed "over 200 elected officials spanning every level of government" were affiliated with DSA.

In 2025, there are over 250 DSA members in office, with 90% elected after 2019. From 2016 to 2025, 128 nationally-endorsed candidates won an election, and 31 DSA endorsed ballot initiatives passed into law.

== Federal officials ==
=== United States House of Representatives ===
==== Current (2) ====
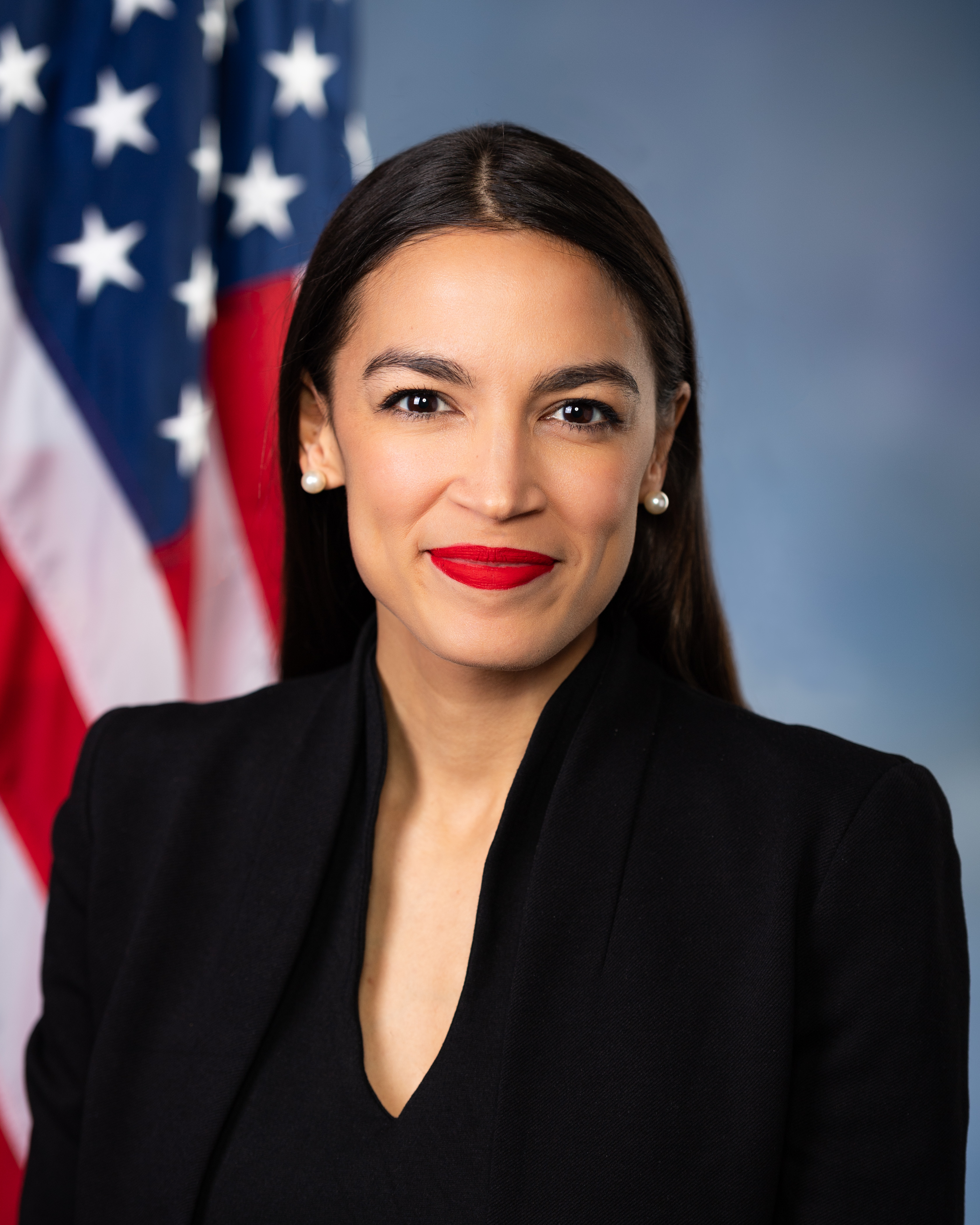
Alexandria Ocasio-Cortez, elected in 2018

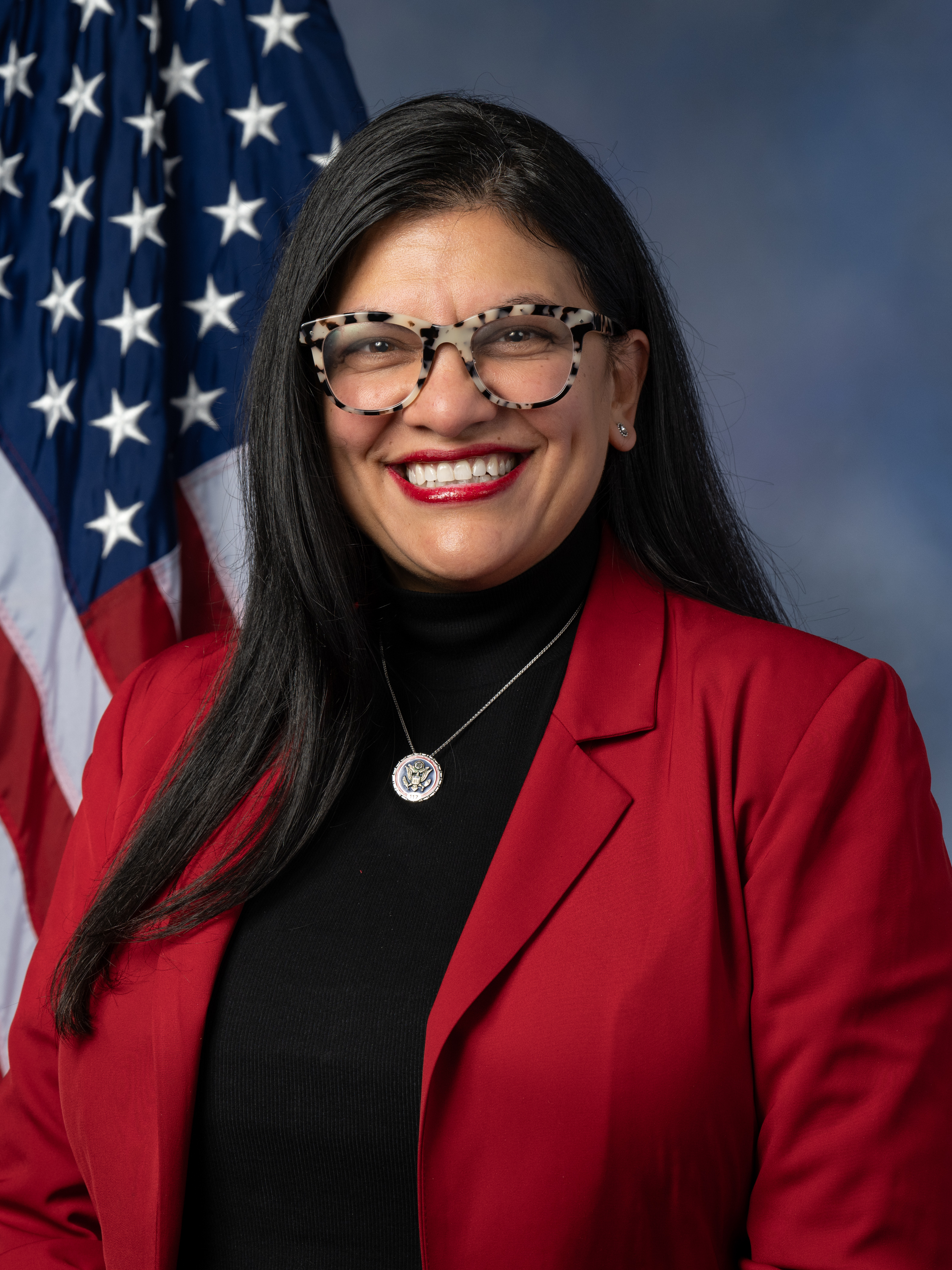
Rashida Tlaib, elected in 2018

Name	State	District	Term start	Term end	Notes	Ref.
Alexandria Ocasio-Cortez	New York	NY-14	2019	Current	member, locally endorsed for this position (Note: AOC was endorsed by national DSA from 2019-2024. AOC remains currently endorsed by New York City DSA.)	
Rashida Tlaib	Michigan	MI-13, MI-12 (Note: Tlaib represented Michigan's 13th district from 2019–2023. Tlaib has since represented Michigan's 12th district from 2023–present.)	2019	Current	member and national endorsee	

==== Elected, not yet sworn in (6) ====
Name	State	District	Term start	Term end	Notes	Ref.
Darializa Avila Chevalier	New York	NY-13	2027	2029	member, locally endorsed for this position	
Claire Valdez	New York	NY-7	2027	2029	member, locally endorsed for this position	
Melat Kiros	Colorado	CO-1	2027	2029	member and national endorsee	
Donavan McKinney	Michigan	MI-13	2027	2029	member and national endorsee	
Chris Rabb	Pennsylvania	PA-3	2027	2029	member and national endorsee	
Angela Gonzales-Torres	California	CA-34	2027	2029	member and national endorsee	

==== Former (11) ====
Name	State	District	Term start	Term end	Notes	Ref.
Greg Casar	Texas	TX-35, TX-37	2023	Current	former member (until 2022), not endorsed for this position (Note: Casar was endorsed for local positions before running for House. National DSA did not endorse his House run. Austin DSA briefly endorsed Casar, then removed endorsement after Casar opposed BDS.)	
Summer Lee	Pennsylvania	PA-12	2023	Current	former member (until 2021), not endorsed for this position (Note: Lee was previously endorsed for her state-level runs when she was a member, but she has not been endorsed for U.S. House since then.)	
Shri Thanedar	Michigan	MI-3, MI-13	2023	2027	expelled former member (until 2023), never endorsed (Note: Thanedar, who is not a socialist, was expelled from DSA after he invited Narendra Modi to speak at the US Capitol. He lost re-election in the 2026 Democratic primary to DSA member Donovan McKinney.)	
Jamaal Bowman	New York	NY-16	2021	2025	member and local-only endorsee (Note: Bowman was endorsed by national DSA from 2021-22. Bowman remains currently endorsed by New York City DSA.)	
Cori Bush	Missouri	MO-1	2021	2025	member and national endorsee	
Danny K. Davis	Illinois	IL-7	1997	2027	former member, former endorsee (Note: Davis faced primary challenges by DSA members on two occasions following his initial election, based on his perceived ineffectiveness and vote to repeal the Dodd–Frank Act.)	
Jerry Nadler	New York	NY-17, NY-8, NY-10, NY-12	1992	2027	former member, former endorsee	
John Conyers	Michigan	MI-1, MI-14, MI-13	1965	2017	member, former endorsee	
Major Owens	New York	NY-12, NY-11	1983	2007	member, former endorsee	
David Bonior	Michigan	MI-12, MI-10	1977	2003	member, former endorsee (Note: Representative David Bonior also served as Democratic whip in the House from 1991 to 2002.)	
Ron Dellums	California	CA-9	1971	1998	member, former endorsee	

== State officials ==
=== Upper and unicameral houses ===
==== Current (16) ====
Name	State	Chamber	District	Term start	Term end	Notes	Ref.
Analise Ortiz	Arizona	Senate	24th	2025	current	endorsee	
Kyra Hoffner	Delaware	Senate	14th	2022	current	member, endorsee	
Robert Peters	Illinois	Senate	13th	2019	current	member, not endorsed for this position	
Rachel Ventura	Illinois	Senate	43rd	2023	current	member, endorsee	
Omar Fateh	Minnesota	Senate	62nd	2021	current	member, endorsee	
Jen McEwen	Minnesota	Senate	8th	2021	current	member, endorsee	
Zaynab Mohamed	Minnesota	Senate	63rd	2023	current	member, endorsee	
Megan Hunt	Nebraska	Unicameral	8th	2019	2027	member, not endorsed for this position	
Jabari Brisport	New York	Senate	25th	2021	current	member, endorsee	
Kristen Gonzalez	New York	Senate	59th	2023	current	member, endorsee	
Julia Salazar	New York	Senate	18th	2019	current	member, endorsee	
Nikil Saval	Pennsylvania	Senate	1st	2021	current	member, endorsee	
Sam Bell	Rhode Island	Senate	5th	2019	current	member, endorsee	
Molly Cook	Texas	Senate	15th	2024	current	former endorsee	
Nate Blouin	Utah	Senate	13th	2023	2027	member, not endorsed for this position	
Tanya Vyhovsky	Vermont	Senate	Chittenden-Central	2023	current	member, endorsee	

==== Elected, not yet sworn in (6) ====
Name	State	Chamber	District	Term start	Term end	Notes	Ref.
Maryam Khan	Connecticut	Senate	2nd	2027	2029	member, endorsee	
Shay Frisby	Delaware	Senate	5th	2027	2031	endorsee	
Ben McAdams	Illinois	Senate	24th	2027	2031	endorsee	
Aber Kawas	New York	Senate	12th	2027	2029	member, endorsee	
Myrna Muñoz	Oregon	Senate	15th	2027	2031	member	
Mark Pinsley	Pennsylvania	Senate	16th	2027	2031	endorsee	

==== Former (8) ====
Name	State	Chamber	District	Term start	Term end	Notes	Ref.
Julie Gonzales	Colorado	Senate	34th	2019	2027	former member	
John Laird	California	Senate	17th	2020	current	former member	
Nancy Skinner	California	Senate	9th	2016	2024	former member	
Jim Marzilli	Massachusetts	Senate	4th Middlesex	2007	2008		
Constance N. Johnson	Oklahoma	Senate	48th	2005	2014		
Ken Jacobsen	Washington	Senate	46th	1997	2011		
Dick Springer	Oregon	Senate	6th	1989	1997		
Scudder Parker	Vermont	Senate		1981	1988		
Julian Bond	Georgia	Senate	39th	1975	1987		

=== Lower houses ===
==== Current (59) ====
Name	State	Chamber	District	Term start	Term end	Notes	Ref.
Alex Lee	California	State Assembly	24th (Note: 25th from 2020-22)	2020	current	member, endorsee in 2020	
Andrew Boesenecker	Colorado	House of Representatives	53rd	2021	current	member	
Javier Mabrey	Colorado	House of Representatives	1st	2023	current	member, endorsee	
Lorena Garcia	Colorado	House of Representatives	35th	2023	current	endorsee	
Yara Zokaie	Colorado	House of Representatives	52nd	2025	current	member, endorsee	
Maryam Khan	Connecticut	House of Representatives	5th	2022	2027	member, endorsee	
Nick Gauthier	Connecticut	House of Representatives	38th	2025	current	member, endorsee	
Laurie Sweet	Connecticut	House of Representatives	91st	2025	current	member, endorsee	
Eric Morrison	Delaware	House of Representatives	27th	2021	current	member	
Angie Nixon	Florida	House of Representatives	13th (Note: 14th from 2020-22)	2020	2027	member	
Gabriel Sanchez	Georgia	House of Representatives	42nd	2025	current	member, endorsee	
Amy Perruso	Hawaii	House of Representatives	46th	2019	current	member, endorsee	
Mandie Landry	Louisiana	House of Representatives	91st	2019	current	member, endorsee	
Grayson Lookner	Maine	House of Representatives	113th	2021	current	member, endorsee	
Gabriel Acevero	Maryland	House of Delegates	39th	2019	current	member, endorsee	
Vaughn Stewart	Maryland	House of Delegates	19th	2019	current	member, endorsee	
Erika Uyterhoeven	Massachusetts	House of Representatives	27th Middlesex	2021	2027	member, endorsee	
Donavan McKinney	Michigan	House of Representatives	11th (Note: 14th from 2023-25)	2023	2027	member, endorsee	
Dylan Wegela	Michigan	House of Representatives	26th	2023	current	member, endorsee	
Jimmie Wilson Jr.	Michigan	House of Representatives	32nd	2023	current	member, endorsee	
Liish Kozlowski	Minnesota	House of Representatives	8B	2023	current	member, endorsee	
Athena Hollins	Minnesota	House of Representatives	66B	2021	current	member, endorsee	
Samantha Sencer-Mura	Minnesota	House of Representatives	63A	2023	current	endorsee	
Denise Joy	Montana	House of Representatives	46th	2024	current	member	
Zooey Zephyr	Montana	House of Representatives	95th	2023	current	member, endorsee	
Ellen Read	New Hampshire	House of Representatives	Rockingham 10th	2016	present	endorsee	
Chigozie Onyema	New Jersey	General Assembly	28th	2026	current	member	
Katie Brennan	New Jersey	General Assembly	32nd	2026	current	member	
Eleanor Chávez	New Mexico	House of Representatives	16th	2023	current	member, endorsee	
Steven Raga	New York	State Assembly	30th	2023	2027	member	
Jessica González-Rojas	New York	State Assembly	34th	2021	2027	member	
Diana Moreno	New York	State Assembly	36th	2026	current	member, endorsee	
Claire Valdez	New York	State Assembly	37th	2025	2027	member, endorsee	
Emily Gallagher	New York	State Assembly	50th	2021	current	member, endorsee	
Marcela Mitaynes	New York	State Assembly	51st	2021	current	member, endorsee	
Phara Souffrant Forrest	New York	State Assembly	57th	2021	current	member, endorsee	
Sarahana Shrestha	New York	State Assembly	103rd	2023	current	member, endorsee	
Tristan Rader	Ohio	House of Representatives	13th	2025	current	member	
Farrah Chaichi	Oregon	House of Representatives	35th	2023	current	member, endorsee	
Mark Gamba	Oregon	House of Representatives	41st	2023	current	member	
Lesly Muñoz	Oregon	House of Representatives	22nd	2025	current	member, endorsee	
Travis Nelson	Oregon	House of Representatives	44th	2022	current	member	
Elizabeth Fiedler	Pennsylvania	House of Representatives	184th	2019	current	member, endorsee	
Rick Krajewski	Pennsylvania	House of Representatives	188th	2021	current	member, endorsee	
Chris Rabb	Pennsylvania	House of Representatives	200th	2017	2027	member, endorsee	
David Morales	Rhode Island	House of Representatives	7th	2021	2027	member, endorsee	
Enrique Sanchez	Rhode Island	House of Representatives	9th	2023	current	member, endorsee	
Torrey Harris	Tennessee	House of Representatives	91st (Note: 90th from 2021-23)	2020	current	endorsee	
Aftyn Behn	Tennessee	House of Representatives	51st	2023	current	endorsee	
Brian Cina	Vermont	House of Representatives	Chittenden-15	2016	current	member, endorsee	
Kate Logan	Vermont	House of Representatives	Chittenden-16	2023	2027	endorsee	
Shaun Scott	Washington	House of Representatives	43rd-Seat B	2025	current	member, endorsee	
Francesca Hong	Wisconsin	State Assembly	76th	2021	2027	member, endorsee	
Ryan Clancy	Wisconsin	State Assembly	19th	2023	current	member, endorsee	
Darrin Madison	Wisconsin	State Assembly	10th	2023	current	member, endorsee	
Christian Phelps	Wisconsin	State Assembly	93rd	2025	current		

==== Elected, not yet sworn in (29) ====
Name	State	Chamber	District	Term start	Term end	Notes	Ref.
Miranda Lopez	Arizona	House of Representatives	21st	2027	2029	member, endorsee	
Alberto Flores	Arizona	House of Representatives	24th	2027	2029	endorsee	
Lisbeth Arescurenaga	Arizona	House of Representatives	24th	2027	2029	endorsee	
Branden Fletcher-Dominguez	Delaware	House of Representatives	3rd	2027	2029	endorsee	
Ashley Herrmann	Florida	House of Representatives	69th	2027	2029	member, endorsee	
Mathewos Samson	Georgia	House of Representatives	58th	2027	2029	member, endorsee	
Robert LeVertis Bell	Kentucky	House of Representatives	43rd	2027	2029	member, endorsee	
Lucy Perkins	Maine	House of Representatives	121st	2027	2029	endorsee	
Chris Gilmer-Hill	Michigan	House of Representatives	8th	2027	2029	member, endorsee	
James Lappe	Missouri	House of Representatives	81st	2027	2029	endorsee	
Heather Deiner	New Hampshire	House of Representatives	Hillsborough 25th	2027	2029	member, endorsee	
Samantha Kattan	New York	State Assembly	37th	2027	2029	member, endorsee	
David Orkin	New York	State Assembly	38th	2027	2029	member, endorsee	
Christian Celeste Tate	New York	State Assembly	54th	2027	2029	member, endorsee	
Eon Huntley	New York	State Assembly	56th	2027	2029	member, endorsee	
Illapa Sairitupac	New York	State Assembly	65th	2027	2029	member, endorsee	
Maruice Brown	New York	State Assembly	129th	2027	2029	endorsee	
Adam Bojak	New York	State Assembly	149th	2027	2029	member, endorsee	
Lukas Maughan	North Dakota	House of Representatives	43rd	2027	2029	member, endorsee	
Daquan Neal	Ohio	House of Representatives	39th	2027	2029	member, endorsee	
Lesly Muñoz	Oregon	House of Representatives	22nd	2027	2029	member, endorsee	
Tammy Carpenter	Oregon	House of Representatives	27th	2027	2029	member, endorsee	
Ce-Ce Gerlach	Pennsylvania	House of Representatives	22nd	2027	2029	endorsee	
Owen Farnsworth	Tennessee	House of Representatives	34th	2027	2029	member, endorsee	
David Chappell	Utah	House of Representatives	62nd	2027	2029	member, not endorsed for this position	
Adam Franz	Vermont	House of Representatives	Chittenden-14	2027	2029	member, endorsee	
Jeffrey Peterson	Vermont	House of Representatives	Chittenden-16	2027	2029	endorsee	
Trang Do	Vermont	House of Representatives	Chittenden-16	2027	2029	endorsee	
Matt Gile	Vermont	House of Representatives	Chittenden-21	2027	2029	member, endorsee	
Jaelynn Scott	Washington	House of Representatives	37th	2027	2029	member, endorsee	

==== Former (42) ====
Name	State	Chamber	District	Term start	Term end	Notes	Ref.
DeShanna Neal	Delaware	House of Representatives	13th	2022	current	former member	
Sophie Phillips	Delaware	House of Representatives	18th	2022	current	former member	
Mike Connolly	Massachusetts	House of Representatives	26th Middlesex	2017	current	former member, until 2023	
Jim Marzilli	Massachusetts	House of Representatives	23rd Middlesex	1991	2007		
Zohran Mamdani	New York	State Assembly	36th	2021	2025	member, endorsee	
Elisabeth Epps	Colorado	House of Representatives	6th	2023	2025		
Tim Hernández	Colorado	House of Representatives	4th	2023	2025		
Abraham Aiyash	Michigan	House of Representatives	4th	2021	2024		
Mo Turner	Oklahoma	House of Representatives	88th	2021	2024		
Emma Mulvaney-Stanak	Vermont	House of Representatives	Chittenden-6-2	2021	2024		
Selene Colburn	Vermont	House of Representatives	Chittenden-6-4	2016	2024		
Danny Tenenbaum	Montana	House of Representatives	95th	2021	2023		
Tanya Vyhovsky	Vermont	House of Representatives	Chittenden-8-1	2021	2023		
Sara Innamorato	Pennsylvania	House of Representatives	21st	2019	2023	former member, until 2019	
Yousef Rabhi	Michigan	House of Representatives	53rd	2017	2023		
Michael Sylvester	Maine	House of Representatives	39th	2017	2023		
Attica Scott	Kentucky	House of Representatives	41st	2017	2023		
Edwin Vargas	Connecticut	House of Representatives	6th	2013	2023		
Ruth Buffalo	North Dakota	House of Representatives	27th	2019	2022		
Summer Lee	Pennsylvania	House of Representatives	34th	2019	2022	former member, until 2021	
Lee J. Carter	Virginia	House of Delegates	50th	2018	2022		
Mark King	New Hampshire	House of Representatives	Hillsborough 33rd	2016	2022		
Timothy Smith	New Hampshire	House of Representatives	Hillsborough 17th	2012	2022		
Jade Bahr	Montana	House of Representatives	50th	2019	2021		
Isaac Robinson	Michigan	House of Representatives	4th	2019	2020		
Kaniela Ing	Hawaii	House of Representatives	11th	2012	2018		
Babette Josephs	Pennsylvania	House of Representatives	182nd	1985	2012		
Nancy Skinner	California	State Assembly	14th, 15th	2008	2014		
John Laird	California	State Assembly	27th	2002	2008		
Jackie Goldberg	California	State Assembly	45th	2000	2006		
Niilo Koponen	Alaska	House of Representatives	21st	1982	1992		
Eileen C. Dugan	New York	State Assembly	52nd	1981	1996		
Jerry Nadler	New York	State Assembly	69th, 67th	1977	1992	former member	
Herman D. Farrell Jr.	New York	State Assembly	74th, 71st	1975	2017	former member	
Perry Bullard	Michigan	House of Representatives	53rd	1973	1992		
Harlan Baker	Maine	House of Representatives		1979	1988		
Tom Gallagher	Massachusetts	House of Representatives	1st Suffolk district	1980	1986		
Ken Jacobsen	Washington	House of Representatives	46th	1983	1997		
Dismas Becker	Wisconsin	State Assembly	13th, 7th	1977	1989		
Bev Stein	Oregon	House of Representatives	14th	1989	1993		
Dick Springer	Oregon	House of Representatives		1981	1989		
Wally Priestley	Oregon	House of Representatives	10th, 12th	1965	1985		

=== Other state-level offices ===
==== Current (2) ====
Name	State	Chamber	Position	Term start	Term end	Notes	Ref.
Sally Lieber	California	Board of Equalization	2nd	since 2023	current	member, endorsee	
Davante Lewis	Louisiana	Public Service Commission	3rd	since 2023	current	member, endorsee	

==== Former (3) ====
Name	State	Chamber	Position	Term start	Term end	Notes	Ref.
Nancy Skinner	California	California Energy Commission	Commissioner	2025	current	former member	
Michelle Fecteau	Michigan	State Board of Education	At-Large	2012	2020	member, endorsee	
John Laird	California	California Natural Resources Agency	Secretary	2011	2019	former member	

== Local officials ==
=== Mayors and county executives ===
==== Current (7) ====
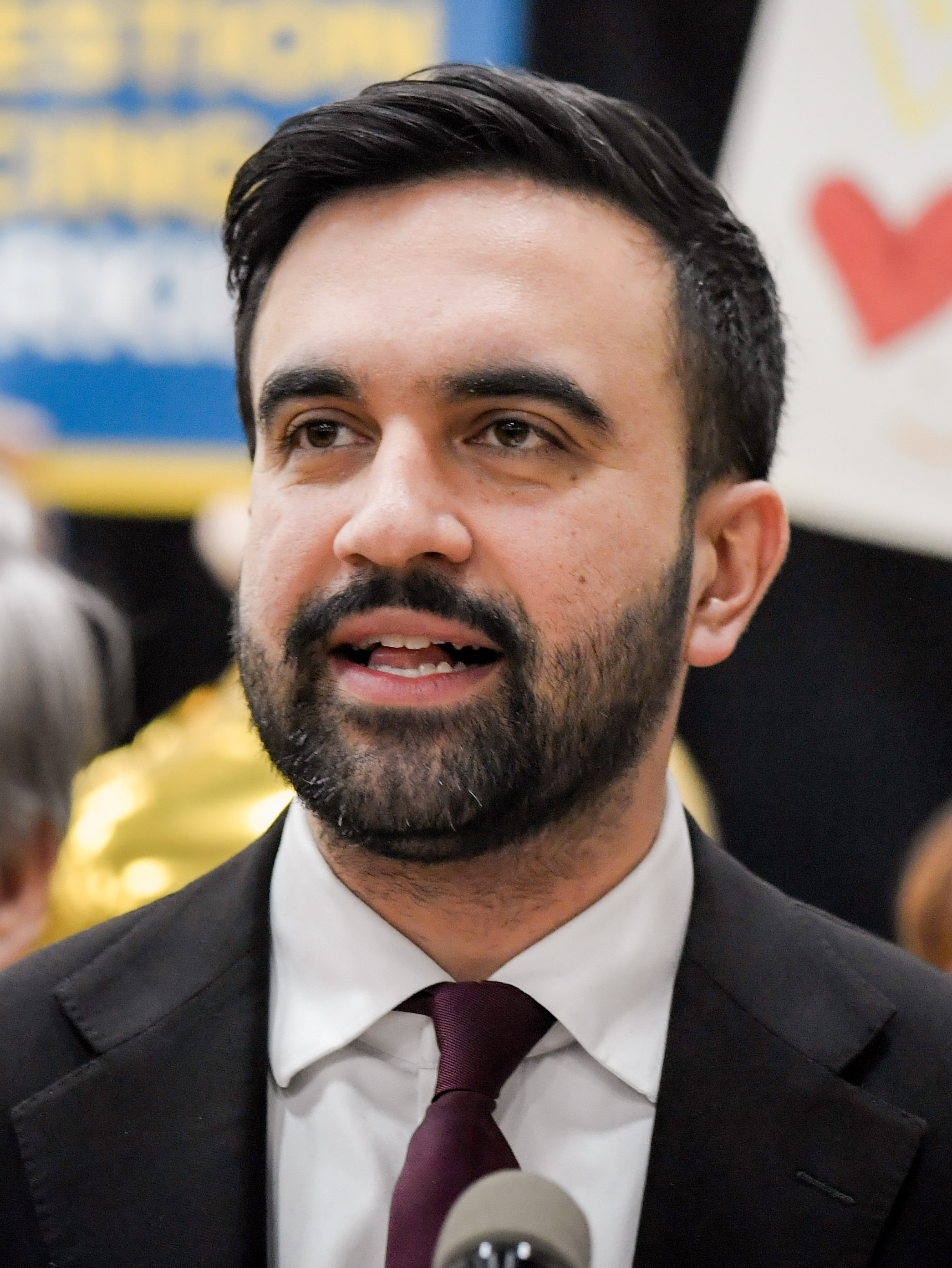
Zohran Mamdani, elected in 2025

Name	Municipality	State	Position	Term start	Term end	Notes	Ref.
Zohran Mamdani	New York City	New York	Mayor	2026	2030	member, endorsee	
Brian Nowak	Cheektowaga	New York	Town Supervisor	2023	2027	endorsee	
Robert Cantelmo	Ithaca	New York	Mayor	2024	2027	member, not endorsed for this position	
Emma Mulvaney-Stanak	Burlington	Vermont	Mayor	2024	2027	member, not endorsed for this position	
Eduardo Martinez	Richmond	California	Mayor	2023	2027	endorsee	
Marc Elrich	Montgomery County	Maryland	County Executive	2018	2026	member, endorsee	

==== Elected, not yet sworn in (9) ====
Name	Municipality	State	Position	Term start	Term end	Notes	Ref.
Claudia Jimenez	Richmond	California	Mayor	2026	2030	endorsee	
Nithya Raman	Los Angeles	California	Mayor	2026	2030	member, endorsee	
Joz Sida	Fontana	California	Mayor	2026	2030	endorsee	
Kristen Sneddon	Santa Barbara	California	Mayor	2026	2030	endorsee	
Kenneth Zuniga	Vista	California	Mayor	2026	2030	member, endorsee	
Briana Urbina	New Carrollton	Maryland	Mayor	2026	2027	endorsee	
Yousef Rabhi	Ann Arbor	Michigan	Mayor	2026	2030	member, endorsee	
David Morales	Providence	Rhode Island	Mayor	2027	2031	member	
Janeese Lewis George	Washington	District of Columbia	Mayor	2027	2031	member, endorsee	

==== Former (16) ====
Name	Municipality	State	Position	Term start	Term end	Notes	Ref
Larry Agran	Irvine	California	Mayor	2025	2027	was member in 1990	
Khalid Kamau	South Fulton	Georgia	Mayor	2022	2025	member, endorsee	
Sara Innamorato	Allegheny County	Pennsylvania	County Executive	2024	2028	former member, denounced DSA statements	
Gus Newport	Berkeley	California	Mayor	1979	1986		
Konstantine Anthony	Burbank	California	Mayor	2022	2023		
Daniel Lee	Culver City	California	Mayor	2021	2022		
Benjamin Nichols	Ithaca	New York	Mayor	1989	1995		
David Dinkins	New York City	New York	Mayor	1990	1993		
Ron Dellums	Oakland	California	Mayor	2007	2011		
Ethan Strimling	Portland	Maine	Mayor	2015	2019	joined DSA after serving as mayor	
James Scheibel	Saint Paul	Minnesota	Mayor	1990	1994		
Justin Cummings	Santa Cruz	California	Mayor	2019	2020		
John Laird	Santa Cruz	California	Mayor	1983	1984		
John Laird	Santa Cruz	California	Mayor	1987	1988		
Bruce Van Allen	Santa Cruz	California	Mayor	1982	1983		
Mike Rotkin	Santa Cruz	California	Mayor	1981	1982		
Mike Rotkin	Santa Cruz	California	Mayor	1985	1986		
Mike Rotkin	Santa Cruz	California	Mayor	1995	1996		
Mike Rotkin	Santa Cruz	California	Mayor	2004	2005		
Mike Rotkin	Santa Cruz	California	Mayor	2009	2010		
James H. Coleman	South San Francisco	California	Mayor	2023	2024		
Sofía Rubalcava	Ventura	California	Mayor	2020	2022		

=== City councils and county commissions (or equivalent) ===
==== Current (109) ====
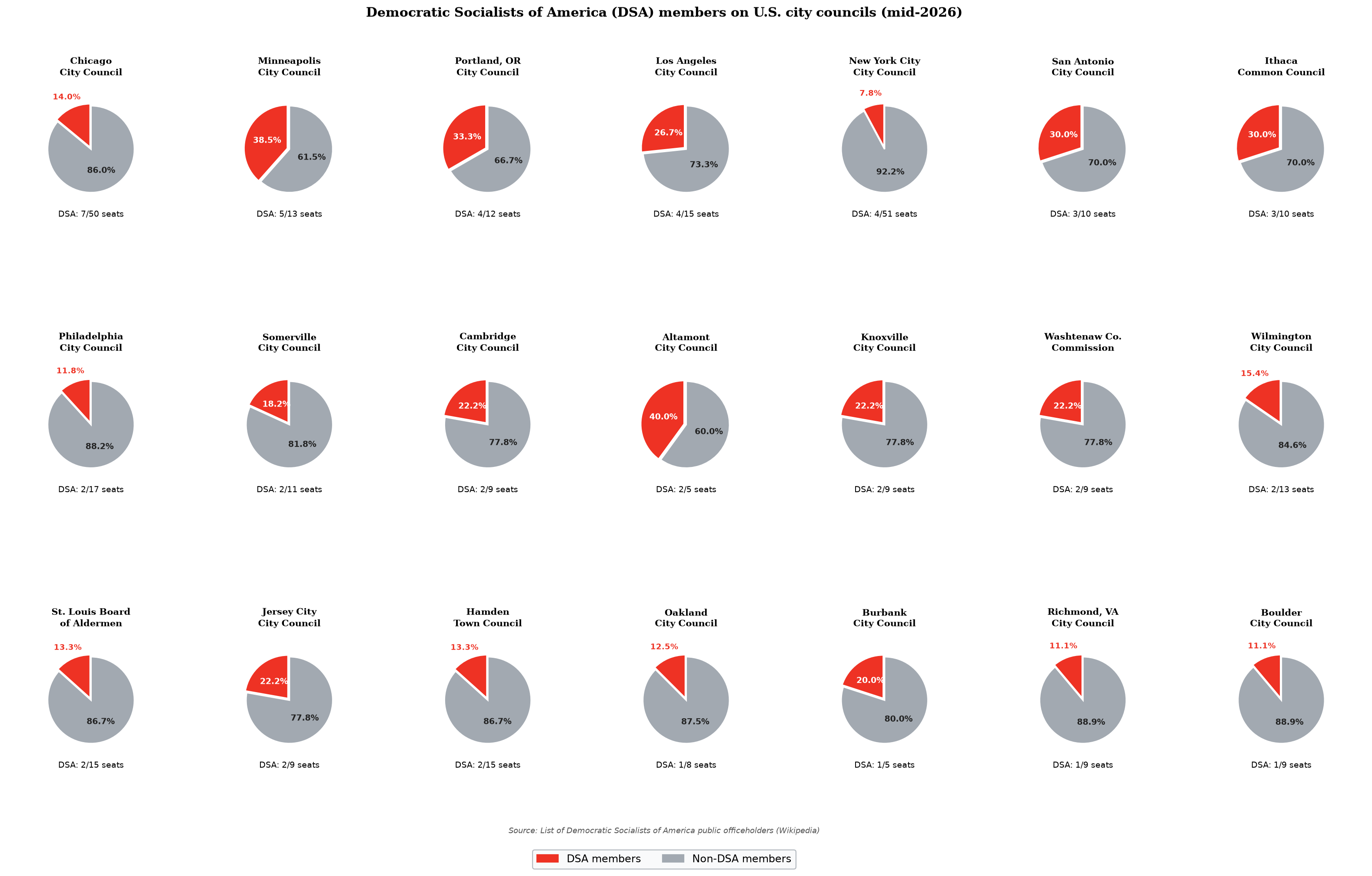
DSA officials and endorsees in various U.S. city councils, as of 2026

Name	Municipality	State	Position	District	Tenure
Tom Hendrickson	Agawam	Massachusetts	City Council	At-Large	since 2022
Jill Brevik	Amherst	Massachusetts	City Council	District 1	since 2025
Tyler Julich	Altamont	Kansas	City Council	At-Large	since 2025
Zac S. Sellers	Altamont	Kansas	City Council	At-Large	since 2025
Kim Roney	Asheville	North Carolina	City Council	At-Large	since 2020
Kelsea Bond	Atlanta	Georgia	City Council	2nd	since 2026
Mike Siegel	Austin	Texas	City Council	7th	since 2025
Cecília Lunaparra	Berkeley	California	City Council	7th	2024-27
Nicole Speer	Boulder	Colorado	City Council	At-Large	2021-2025
Lauren Folkerts	Boulder	Colorado	City Council	At-Large	2021-2025
Robin Wilt	Brighton	New York	Town Council	At-Large	since 2018
Konstantine Anthony	Burbank	California	City Council	4th	since 2022
Marek Broderick	Burlington	Vermont	City Council	8th	since 2024
Ayah Al-Zubi	Cambridge	Massachusetts	City Council	At-Large	since 2026
Jivan Sobrinho-Wheeler	Cambridge	Massachusetts	City Council	At-Large	since 2023
Danny Nowell	Carrboro	North Carolina	Town Council	At-Large	since 2021
Michael Payne	Charlottesville	Virginia	City Council	At-Large	since 2020
Anthony Quezada	Chicago	Illinois	City Council	35th	since 2025
Daniel La Spata	Chicago	Illinois	City Council	1st	since 2019
Rossana Rodriguez-Sanchez	Chicago	Illinois	City Council	33rd	since 2019
Byron Sigcho-Lopez	Chicago	Illinois	City Council	25th	since 2019
Jeanette Taylor	Chicago	Illinois	City Council	20th	since 2019
Andre Vasquez	Chicago	Illinois	City Council	40th	since 2019
Angela Clay	Chicago	Illinois	City Council	46th	since 2023
Tanmay Shah	Cleveland	Ohio	City Council	Ward 12	since 2026
Vera Elwood	Columbia	Missouri	City Council	2nd Ward	since 2025
Sylvia Campos	Corpus Christi	Texas	City Council	District 2	since 2023
Denzel McCampbell	Detroit	Michigan	City Council	District 7	since 2026
Nate Baker	Durham	North Carolina	City Council	At-Large	2023-2027
Frankie Fritz	Greenbelt	Maryland	City Council	At-Large	since 2026
Abdul Osmanu	Hamden	Connecticut	Town Council	3rd District	since 2021
Maurine Crouch	Hamden	Connecticut	Town Council	At-Large	since 2025
Nate Simpson	New Britain	Connecticut	Common Council	Ward 1	since 2025
Jeff Hart	New London	Connecticut	Town Council	At-Large	since 2025
Maria Threese-Serana	New Haven	Connecticut	Board of Aldermen	Ward 9	since 2026
Kayla Matos	Ithaca	New York	Common Council	Ward 1	since 2023
Jorge DeFendini	Ithaca	New York	Common Council	Ward 1	since 2026
Hannah Shvets	Ithaca	New York	Common Council	Ward 5	since 2026
Jake Ephros	Jersey City	New Jersey	City Council	Ward D	since 2026
Joel Brooks	Jersey City	New Jersey	City Council	Ward B	since 2026
Jon Green	Johnson County	Iowa	Board of Supervisors	At-Large	since 2021
Seema Singh	Knoxville	Tennessee	City Council	District 3	since 2017
Amelia Parker	Knoxville	Tennessee	City Council	At-Large	since 2019
Nithya Raman	Los Angeles	California	City Council	4th	2020-27
Eunisses Hernandez	Los Angeles	California	City Council	1st	since 2022
Hugo Soto-Martinez	Los Angeles	California	City Council	13th	since 2022
Ysabel Jurado	Los Angeles	California	City Council	14th	since 2024
J.P. Lyninger	Louisville	Kentucky	City Council	6th	since 2025
Yannette Figueroa Cole	Madison	Wisconsin	Common Council	10th	since 2021
Zac Bears (Note: Full name "Isaac Bears".)	Medford	Massachusetts	City Council	At-Large	2019-2026
Darnell H. Ford	Middletown	Connecticut	Common Council	At-large	since 2019
Dan Bailey	Milton Township	Illinois	Township Clerk		since 2025
Alex Brower	Milwaukee	Wisconsin	Common Council	3rd District	since 2025
Aisha Chughtai	Minneapolis	Minnesota	City Council	Ward 10	since 2022
Aurin Chowdhury	Minneapolis	Minnesota	City Council	Ward 12	since 2024
Jason Chavez	Minneapolis	Minnesota	City Council	Ward 9	since 2022
Robin Wonsley	Minneapolis	Minnesota	City Council	Ward 2	since 2022
Soren Stevenson	Minneapolis	Minnesota	City Council	Ward 8	since 2026
Daniel Carlino	Missoula	Montana	City Council	Ward 3	since 2022
Kristin Mink	Montgomery County	Maryland	County Council	District 5	since 2022
Sean Parker	Nashville	Tennessee	City Council	5th	since 2019
Giselle Martinez	Newburgh	New York	City Council	Ward 1	since 2021
Tiffany Cabán	New York City	New York	City Council	22nd	since 2022
Chi Ossé	New York City	New York	City Council	36th	since 2022
Alexa Avilés	New York City	New York	City Council	38th	since 2022
Shahana Hanif	New York City	New York	City Council	39th	since 2022
David McMahon	Norristown	Pennsylvania	City Council	At-Large	Since 2025
Kyle Jacobs	North Newton	Kansas	City Council	At-Large	Since 2025
Carroll Fife	Oakland	California	City Council	3rd	since 2020
Kendra Brooks	Philadelphia	Pennsylvania	City Council	At-large	since 2020
Nicolas O'Rourke	Philadelphia	Pennsylvania	City Council	At-large	since 2024
Ross Grooters	Pleasant Hill	Iowa	City Council	At-Large	since 2017
Mikal Goodman	Pontiac	Michigan	City Council	At-large	since 2022
Wes Pelletier	Portland	Maine	City Council	2nd	since 2025
Kate Sykes	Portland	Maine	City Council	5th	since 2023
Sameer Kanal	Portland	Oregon	City Council	District 2	since 2025
Tiffany Koyama Lane	Portland	Oregon	City Council	District 3	since 2025
Angelita Morillo	Portland	Oregon	City Council	District 3	since 2025
Mitch Green	Portland	Oregon	City Council	District 4	since 2025
Daniel Atonna	Poughkeepsie	New York	Common Council	Ward 8	since 2026
Rachel M. Miller	Providence	Rhode Island	City Council	Ward 13	since 2019
Shayla Adams-Stafford	Prince George's County	Maryland	County Council	5th	since 2025
Claudia Jimenez	Richmond	California	City Council	District 6	since 2021
Kenya Gibson	Richmond	Virginia	City Council	3rd	since 2025
Dylan Parker	Rock Island	Illinois	Alderman	Ward 5	since 2017
Zola Shaw	Rockville	Maryland	City Council	At-Large	since 2024
Katie Valenzuela	Sacramento	California	City Council	4th	since 2020
Teri Castillo	San Antonio	Texas	City Council	5th	since 2021
Jalen McKee-Rodriguez	San Antonio	Texas	City Council	2nd	since 2021
Ric Galvan	San Antonio	Texas	City Council	6th	since 2025
Jackie Fielder	San Francisco	California	Board of Supervisors	9th	since 2025
Wendy Santamaria	Santa Barbara	California	City Council	1st	since 2024
Alma Castro	Santa Fe	New Mexico	City Council	1st	since 2024
Adam Fulton Johnson	Santa Fe	New Mexico	County Commission	District 4	since 2025
J. T. Scott	Somerville	Massachusetts	City Council	Ward 2	since 2018
Ben Ewen-Campen	Somerville	Massachusetts	City Council	Ward 3	since 2018
James H. Coleman	South San Francisco	California	City Council	4th	since 2020
Richie Floyd	St Petersburg	Florida	City Council	8th	since 2021
Megan Green	St. Louis	Missouri	Board of Aldermen	President	since 2022
Alisha Sonnier	St. Louis	Missouri	Board of Aldermen	Ward 7	since 2023
Ashley Grimm	St Louis County	Minnesota	County Commission	District 3	since 2021
Jamika Scott	Tacoma	Washington	City Council	3rd	since 2021
Veronica Pillar	Tompkins County	New York	County Legislature	District 2	since 2021
Miranda Schubert	Tucson	Arizona	City Council	Ward 6	since 2026
Lorrie L. Brown	Ventura	California	City Council	6th	since 2018
Janeese Lewis George	Washington, D.C.	District of Columbia	City Council	4th	2021-27
Yousef Rabhi	Washtenaw County	Michigan	County Commission	8th	2010–16, since 2023
Katie Scott	Washtenaw County	Michigan	County Commission	9th	since 2019
Shané Darby	Wilmington	Delaware	City Council	2nd	since 2020
Coby Owens	Wilmington	Delaware	City Council	1st	since 2024
Bobby Nichols	Tempe	Arizona	City Council	At-Large	since 2026

==== Elected, not yet sworn in (30) ====
Name	Municipality	State	Position	District	Tenure	Notes
Lela Chism	Shannon Hills	Arkansas	City Council	Ward 2	2027	
Syrak Micael	Berkeley	California	City Council	7th	2027	
Nolan Southerland	Burbank	California	City Council	At-Large	2027	national endorsee
Mike van Gorder	Burbank	California	City Council	At-Large	2027	
Ofelia Bello	East Palo Alto	California	City Council	At-Large	2027	
G Mario Fernandez	Eureka	California	City Council	Ward 3	2027	
George Syrop	Hayward	California	City Council	1st	2027	
Benjamin Vasquez	Santa Ana	California	City Council	Ward 2	2027	
Sandra de Anda	Santa Ana	California	City Council	Ward 4	2027	
Isuri Ramos	Santa Ana	California	City Council	Ward 6	2027	
Devon Wardlow	Santa Barbara	California	City Council	4th	2027	
Ian Baucke	Santa Barbara	California	City Council	5th	2027	
Gabe Escobedo	Santa Barbara	California	City Council	6th	2027	
Joanna Paun	Sonoma County	California	County Board of Supervisors	2nd	2027	
Stephen Post	West Hollywood	California	City Council	At-Large	2027	
Jason Hoover	New Castle	Delaware	County Council	4th	2027	
Richie Floyd	St. Petersburg	Florida	City Council	8th	2027	national endorsee
Kate Conner	Fort Wayne	Indiana	County Commission	2nd	2027	
Ethan Spurling	Douglas County	Kansas	County Commission	4th	2027	
McKayla Wilkes	Charles County	Maryland	County Commission	3rd	2027	
Christian Benford	Frederick County	Maryland	County Council	3rd	2027	
Desiraé Simmons	Ypsilanti	Michigan	City Council	Ward 3	2027	
Sarah Opitz	Moorhead	Minnesota	City Council	Ward 1	2027	
Heather Nesemeier	Moorhead	Minnesota	City Council	Ward 2	2027	
Mai Chong Xiong	Ramsey County	Minnesota	County Commission	D6	2027	
Kris Eilers	St. Louis County	Minnesota	County Commission	1st	2027	
Jo Bennett	Onondaga County	New York	County Legislature	15th	2027	national endorsee
Emily Couse	Thurston County	Washington	County Commission	5th	2027	
Aparna Raj	Washington, D.C.	District of Columbia	City Council	Ward 1	2027	
Oye Owolewa	Washington, D.C.	District of Columbia	City Council	At-Large	2027	

==== Former (61) ====
Name	Municipality	State	Position	Tenure
Jesse Brown	Indianapolis	Indiana	City Council	since 2024 (Note: Brown was formally endorsed by Central Indiana DSA from 2023 to 2026, when the group revoked their endorsement. As of July 2026, Brown had " stopped paying dues and is no longer an official member of the local DSA chapter, but he still identifies as a democratic socialist.")
Megan Deichler	Poughkeepsie	New York	Common Council	2022-25
Phoebe Brown	Ithaca	New York	Common Council	2022-25
Tiffany Kumar	Ithaca	New York	Common Council	2022-25
Dean Preston	San Francisco	California	Board of Supervisors	2019–25
Zachary Parker	Washington, D.C.	District of Columbia	City Council	2023–23 (Note: Parker was censured in 2023 by Metro DC Democratic Socialists of America for voting in favor of the "Secure DC" crime bill.)
Jovanka Beckles	Richmond	California	City Council	2011–18
Melvin Willis	Richmond	California	City Council	2017-24
Gayle McLaughlin	Richmond	California	City Council	2005–17, 2021-24
Sally Lieber	Mountain View	California	City Council	2021–22
Jackie Goldberg	Los Angeles	California	City Council	1994–2000
Larry Agran	Irvine	California	City Council	1982–2014, 2020–24
Daniel Lee	Culver City	California	City Council	2018–22
Allison Reddy	Redwood City	California	City Council	2018–22
Monica Montgomery Steppe	San Diego	California	City Council	2018–23
Justin Cummings	Santa Cruz	California	City Council	2020–22
Drew Glover	Santa Cruz	California	City Council	2018-20
Eduardo Martinez	Richmond	California	City Council	2015–22
Sofía Rubalcava	Ventura	California	City Council	2018-22
Harry Britt	San Francisco	California	Board of Supervisors	1979-93
Alison Coombs	Aurora	Colorado	City Council	since 2019
Juan Marcano	Aurora	Colorado	City Council	2020–23
Candi CdeBaca	Denver	Colorado	City Council	2019–23
Sarah Parady	Denver	Colorado	City Council	2023-2026
Charles Decker	New Haven	Connecticut	Board of Alderman	2017–19
Justin Farmer	Hamden	Connecticut	Town Council	2017-2023
Hilda Mason	Washington, D.C.	District of Columbia	Council	1977–99
Mariah Parker	Athens-Clarke County	Georgia	County Commission	2018–22
Carlos Ramirez-Rosa	Chicago	Illinois	City Council	2015-25
Anthony Quezada	Cook County	Illinois	County Commission	2022-25
Indira Sheumaker	Des Moines	Iowa	City Council	2022–23
Attica Scott	Louisville	Kentucky	City Council	2011–15
Tom Hendrickson	Agawam	Massachusetts	City Council	since 2022
Kendra Lara	Boston	Massachusetts	City Council	2022–24
Willie Burnley, Jr.	Somerville	Massachusetts	City Council	2022-26
Charlotte Kelly	Somerville	Massachusetts	City Council	2022-24
Dan Aymar-Blair	Beacon	New York	City Council	2019-24
Brian Nowak	Cheektowaga	New York	Town Supervisor	2017-22
Jorge DeFendini	Ithaca	New York	Common Council	2021-23
Ruth Messinger	New York City	New York	City Council	1978–89
Carlina Rivera	New York City	New York	City Council	2018-25 (former member)
Brad Lander	New York City	New York	City Council	2010–21
Kristin Richardson Jordan	New York City	New York	City Council	2022–23
Vanessa Agudelo	Peekskill	New York	City Council	2017-21
Sarah Salem	Poughkeepsie	New York	Common Council	2019-22
Megan Deichler	Poughkeepsie	New York	Common Council	2022-25
Phil Erner	Ulster County	New York	Legislative Council	2022–23
Tristan Rader	Lakewood	Ohio	City Council	2017–25
David Scondras	Boston	Massachusetts	City Council	1984–93
David Sullivan	Cambridge	Massachusetts	City Council	1980–90
Brandon Betz	Lansing	Michigan	City Council	2021-22
Zolton Ferency	East Lansing	Michigan	City Council	1991-93
Zolton Ferency	Ingham County	Michigan	Board of Commissioners	1980-91
Maryann Mahaffey	Detroit	Michigan	City Council	1973-2005
Joel Sipress	Duluth	Minnesota	City Council	2014–21
Michael Paymar	Duluth	Minnesota	City Council	1980–88
Denise Joy	Billings	Montana	City Council	2017–24
Kshama Sawant	Seattle	Washington	City Council	2013–24 (former member)
Tammy Morales	Seattle	Washington	City Council	2020–25
Greg Casar	Austin	Texas	City Council	2014-22
Jack Hanson	Burlington	Vermont	City Council	2019-21
Perri Freeman	Burlington	Vermont	City Council	2019-23
Juliana Bennett	Madison	Wisconsin	Common Council	2021-25
Marsha Rummel	Madison	Wisconsin	Common Council	2007-25
Ryan Clancy	Milwaukee County	Wisconsin	Board of Supervisors	2020-22
Stuart D. Levitan	Dane County	Wisconsin	Board of Supervisors	1982-87

=== Other local, municipal, and county offices ===
==== Current (32) ====
Name	Local government authority	State	Position	District	Tenure	Notes
Julie Ann Nitsch	Austin Community College District	Texas	Board of Trustees	9th	since 2016	Local endorsee
Jovanka Beckles	Alameda County and Contra Costa County	California	AC Transit Board	1st	since 2021	Local endorsee
Soli Alpert	Berkeley	California	Rent Board Commissioner		since 2018	Local endorsee
Dominique Walker	Berkeley	California	Rent Board Commissioner		since 2020	Local endorsee
Xavier Johnson	Berkeley	California	Rent Board Commissioner		since 2020	Local endorsee
Vanessa Danielle Marreo	Berkeley	California	Rent Board Commissioner		since 2022	Local endorsee
Ida Martinac	Berkeley	California	Rent Board Commissioner		since 2022	Local endorsee
Nathan Mizell	Berkeley	California	Rent Board Commissioner		since 2022	Local endorsee
Alfred Twu	Berkeley	California	Rent Board Commissioner		since 2024	Local endorsee
Carlos Ramirez-Rosa	Chicago Park District	Illinois	General Superintendent and CEO		since 2025	
Amy Trauth	Christina	Delaware	School Board	District D	since 2024	Local endorsee
Dan Aymar-Blair	Dutchess County	New York	Comptroller		since 2025	Member, previous local endorsee
Elizabeth Everhart	Jefferson County	Kentucky	Soil and Water Conservation District Board of Supervisors		since 2025	Member, local endorsee
Karla Griego	Los Angeles	California	School Board	5th	since 2024	Local endorsee
Rocío Rivas	Los Angeles	California	School Board	2nd	since 2023	Local endorsee
Kristina Wong	Los Angeles	California	Wilshire Center-Koreatown Neighborhood Council	Sub-district 5	since 2019	
Maebe A. Girl	Los Angeles	California	Silver Lake Neighborhood Council	At-Large	since 2019	
Jumaane Williams	New York City	New York	New York City Public Advocate	At-large	since 2019	
Mike Hutchinson	Oakland	California	School Board	4th	since 2021	
Xander Orenstein	Pittsburgh	Pennsylvania	District Magistrate		since 2021	Local endorsee
Rae Vander Werf	Sacramento	California	American River Flood Control District Board of Trustees	Division 5	since 2018	Local endorsee
Erin Evans	San Diego County	California	School Board	4th	since 2025	
Justin Cummings	Santa Cruz County	California	Board of Supervisors	3rd	since 2022	Local endorsee
Natalya Lakhtakia	Saratoga Springs	New York	School Board	At-large	since 2019	
José Garza	Travis County	Texas	District Attorney	At-large	since 2021	Local endorsee
Gabriela Biro	New Orleans	Louisiana	School Board	2nd	since 2025	Local endorsee
Dieter Lehmann Morales	Washington, D.C.	District of Columbia	Advisory Neighborhood Commission	1A	since 2023	
Kristy Cooper	Ypsilanti District Library	Michigan	Board of Trustees	At-large	since 2018	Local endorsee
Victor Hinojosa	Waukegan	Illinois	Waukegan Public Library Board of Trustees Reaching Across Illinois Library System Board of Directors	At-Large	since 2025/2026	Member

==== Elected, not yet sworn in (19) ====
Name	Local government authority	State	Position	District	Tenure
Wendell Griffen	Pulaski County	Arkansas	County Judge	At-Large	2027
Avery Arbaugh	Berkeley	California	Rent Board Commissioner	At-Large	2027
Derek Rodriguez	Berkeley	California	Rent Board Commissioner	At-Large	2027
Vylma Ortiz	Berkeley	California	Rent Board Commissioner	At-Large	2027
Yaritza Gonzalez	Inglewood	California	School Board	Area 3	2027
Jennifer Brouhard	Oakland	California	School Board	2nd	2027
Marissa Roy	Los Angeles	California	City Attorney		2027
Emily Smet	Sacramento	California	American River Flood Control District	Division 2	2027
Sarah Seitchik Sebastian	Petaluma	California	Board of Trustees	Area 5	2027
Joey Aszterbaum	San Diego	California	School Board	Area 6	2027
Estefany Castañeda	Los Angeles County	California	School Board	Area 5	2027
Deborah Pope	Chicago	Illinois	School Board	2B	2027
Karen Zaccor	Chicago	Illinois	School Board	4A	2027
Douglas Janicke	Dekalb County	Illinois	County Clerk	At-Large	2027
Ashley Esposito	Baltimore City	Maryland	School Board	At-Large	2027
Jessica Newman	Ferndale	Michigan	School Board	At-Large	2027
Christin Crabtree	Minneapolis-Saint Paul	Minnesota	School Board	At-Large	2027
Natalie bent Kitaif	Durham	North Carolina	School Board	1st	2027
Dr. Jacqueline McDonnough	Richmond	Virginia	School Board	6th	2027

==== Former (21) ====
Name	Local government authority	State	Position	District	Tenure
Andrew Gonzales	Austin Independent School District	Texas	Board of Trustees	6th	2022-26
James Chang	Berkeley	California	Rent Board Commissioner	At-Large	2014-22
Maria Poblet	Berkeley	California	Rent Board Commissioner	At-Large	2018-23
Paola Laverde	Berkeley	California	Rent Board Commissioner	At-Large	2014-22
Jackie Goldberg	Los Angeles	California	School Board	5th	2019-24
Jason Boxer	Manhattan Beach	California	School Board	At-Large	2020-23
Auon'tai Anderson	Denver	Colorado	Board of Education	At-Large	2019-23
Mariam Khan	Hamden	Connecticut	School Board	At-Large	2021-23
Adam Broad	Vernon Township	Illinois	Board of Trustees	At-Large	2017-21
Brad Lander	New York City	New York	New York City Comptroller	At-large	2022-25 (former member)
David Dinkins	New York City	New York	Borough president	Manhattan	1986-89
Ruth Messinger	New York City	New York	Borough president	Manhattan	1990-98
Scott Alberts	Upper Darby	Pennsylvania	Treasurer	At-Large	2017-20
Franklin Bynum	Harris County	Texas	Criminal Court	8th District	2019-22
Danny Norris	Harris County	Texas	Board of Education	Precinct 1	2019-23
Hayden Gise	Washington, D.C.	District of Columbia	Advisory Neighborhood Commission	3C	2022-25
Ryan Linehan	Washington, D.C.	District of Columbia	Advisory Neighborhood Commission	5D	2019-21
Beau Finley	Washington, D.C.	District of Columbia	Advisory Neighborhood Commission	3C	2017-23
Dan Orlaskey	Washington, D.C.	District of Columbia	Advisory Neighborhood Commission	1B	2019-23
Matthew Sampson	Washington, D.C.	District of Columbia	Advisory Neighborhood Commission	2B	2019-21
Emily Gasoi	Washington, D.C.	District of Columbia	State Board of Education	Ward 1	2019-23
Ananda Mirilli	Madison	Wisconsin	Board of Education	Seat 3	2019-22

== See also ==
- Young Democratic Socialists of America
- Democratic Socialists of America chapters:
  - Chicago Democratic Socialists of America
  - Los Angeles Democratic Socialists of America
  - Metro DC Democratic Socialists of America
  - New York City Democratic Socialists of America
  - Seattle Democratic Socialists of America
  - Twin Cities Democratic Socialists of America
- Category:Members of the Democratic Socialists of America
- History of socialism in the United States:
  - Socialism in the United States
  - American Left
- Other lists:
  - List of socialist members of the United States Congress
  - List of elected socialist mayors in the United States
  - List of Communist Party USA members who have held office in the United States
  - List of Green politicians who have held office in the United States
- New York State Socialists in Office
- Chicago City Council Socialist Caucus
- The Squad (United States Congress)
- Congressional Progressive Caucus
