= New York City Democratic Socialists of America =

Chapter of the US political organization

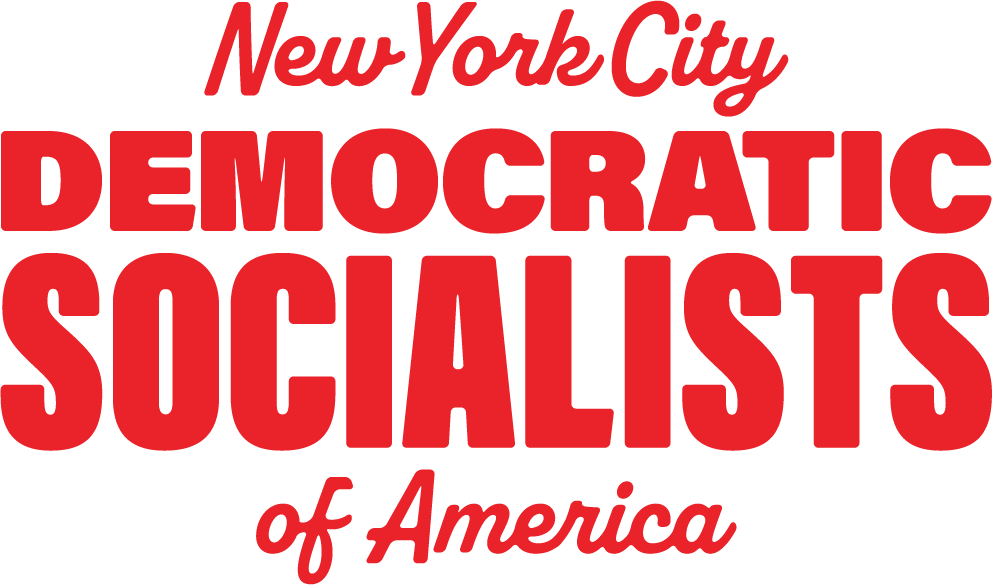
- Abbreviation: NYC-DSA
- Governing body: Steering Committee
- Co-chairs: Gustavo Gordillo; Grace Mausser
- Headquarters: 14 Jefferson Street, Manhattan
- Membership (July 2026): ▲15,793
- Ideology: Democratic socialism; Socialism (multi-tendency)
- Political position: Left-wing to far-left
- National affiliation: Democratic Socialists of America
- State Legislature caucus: New York State Socialists in Office
- City Council caucus: New York City Socialists in Office
- New York City Council: 4 / 51 (Note: DSA does not have a ballot line of its own. DSA runs candidates on the ballot lines of other political parties. The vast majority of DSA members in elected office ran on the Democratic Party ballot line.)
- Citywide executive offices: 2 / 3 (Note: Jumaane Williams is a member of DSA but not officially endorsed)
- State Assembly (NYC): 10 / 65 (Note: Brian Romero is a member of DSA but not officially endorsed)
- State Senate (NYC): 5 / 28 (Note: Jessica González-Rojas is a member of DSA but not officially endorsed)
- U.S. House (NYC): 3 / 13

Website
- socialists.nyc

The New York City Democratic Socialists of America (NYC-DSA) is the New York City chapter of the Democratic Socialists of America. It is the largest chapter of the organization, with more than 15,000 members, ahead of DSA-LA.

DSA has been active in New York City (where it is headquartered) since the 1980s, and it grew significantly after Bernie Sanders' 2016 presidential campaign. The chapter began to endorse candidates in 2017, including Alexandria Ocasio-Cortez. In the 2020s, it ran slates of candidates and won elections at the city, state, and federal levels. In 2025, NYC-DSA assemblyman Zohran Mamdani was elected mayor, following an upset victory in the Democratic primary and the subsequent general election. Mamdani's election spurred a growth of chapter membership and success in the 2026 elections.

NYC-DSA is made up of several local branches within the five boroughs and comprises working groups, led by its Steering Committee and co-chairs. Endorsements require votes by the chapter’s branches and its Citywide Leadership Committee, and endorsed candidates usually run on the Democratic Party ballot line. Elected officials coordinate with the chapter through city and state "Socialists in Office" committees. The chapter supports progressive reforms, with the end goal of a socialist economy. NYC-DSA's primary base is young renters, particularly in the Brooklyn and Queens neighborhoods nicknamed the "Commie Corridor." NYC-DSA has been criticized by both Democrats and Republicans, accusing it of anti-Israel sentiment, communism, and limited appeal among the working class.

== Organization and structure ==
NYC-DSA is the largest local chapter of the Democratic Socialists of America (DSA). NYC-DSA includes seven branches: Flatbush; North Brooklyn; Central Brooklyn; South Brooklyn (including Staten Island); Queens; Lower Manhattan; and Bronx/Upper Manhattan (B/UM). An estimated 2,700-3,000 members of the chapter reside in New York's 7th congressional district, while over 2,000 reside in the 10th district. As of 2020, over half of DSA members in New York State lived in Brooklyn. 500 members live in AD-36, 460 in AD-37, 220 in AD-34, and 200 in AD-70 as of 2026.

NYC-DSA has two leadership bodies: The Steering Committee (SC) and the Citywide Leadership Committee (CLC), both elected by members. SC is composed of 7 branch representatives, one elected by each branch; 2 Co-Chairs, 6 officers, and 2 coordinators, each elected by NYC-DSA membership as a whole. CLC is larger and meets less frequently, with more seats for branch delegates and 2 seats for Young Democratic Socialists of America delegates. The current co-chairs of NYC-DSA are Gustavo Gordillo and Grace Mausser. NYC-DSA approved full time salaries of $95,000 per year for co-chairs in 2026. NYC-DSA members are also encouraged to join various Working Groups, which each focus on a specific issue, including Electoral, Immigrant Justice, Racial Justice, Ecosocialist, Socialist Feminist, Trans Rights and Bodily Autonomy, Anti-War, and Labor. NYC-DSA's annual convention is the chapter's "highest decision-making body", which debates resolutions and constitutional amendments, and which sets priority campaigns for the next year.

=== Endorsements ===
Unlike most political parties, New York City DSA does not have a ballot line. Instead, NYC-DSA acts "like a party" or a "party surrogate" by endorsing and canvassing for candidates it supports. The NYC-DSA endorsement process requires candidates to complete a questionnaire, answer questions from NYC-DSA members at citywide and branch-based forums, and win an endorsement vote in the relevant local branches. If the candidate passes the branch votes, the Citywide Leadership Committee (CLC) votes on the endorsements. NYC-DSA endorsements are separate from national DSA endorsements.

NYC-DSA usually runs candidates on the Democratic ballot line to be viable, but is not "necessarily tied" to the party and hopes to build independent socialist power. NYC-DSA often collaborates with the Working Families Party, though DSA and WFP endorsees have competed against each other. NYC-DSA has a presence in local unions, including in the United Auto Workers.

NYC-DSA's Socialists in Office (SIO) committee coordinates between and communicate with local DSA-endorsed officials. If the committee comes to a consensus and adopts a position, NYC-DSA assembly members are expected to vote as a bloc. The committee also serves to insulate members from legislative pressure. Co-chair Mausser meets with Ocasio-Cortez's team monthly.

== History ==
=== Early history ===
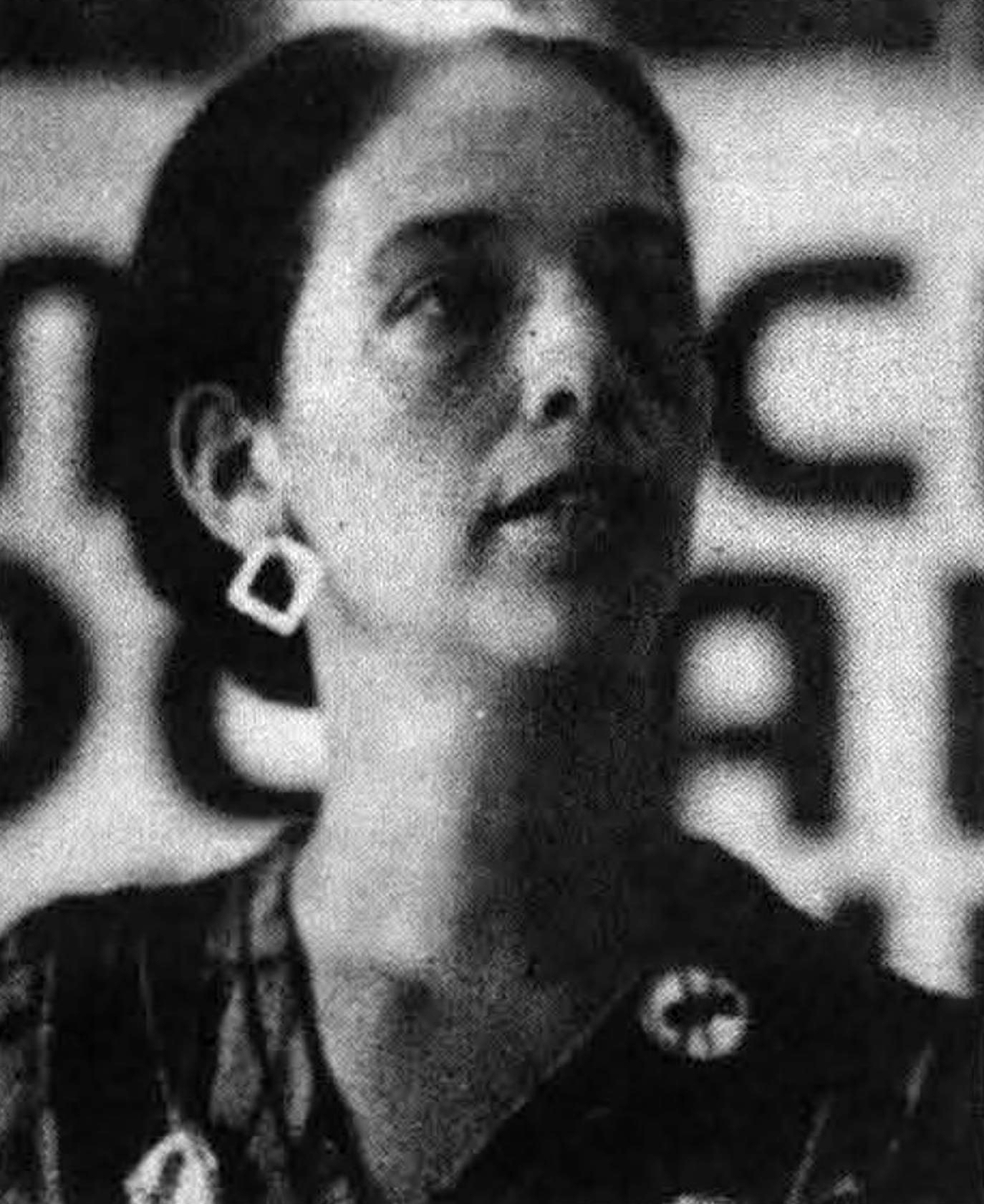
Ruth Messinger at a DSOC meeting held at the 1980 DNC in Manhattan

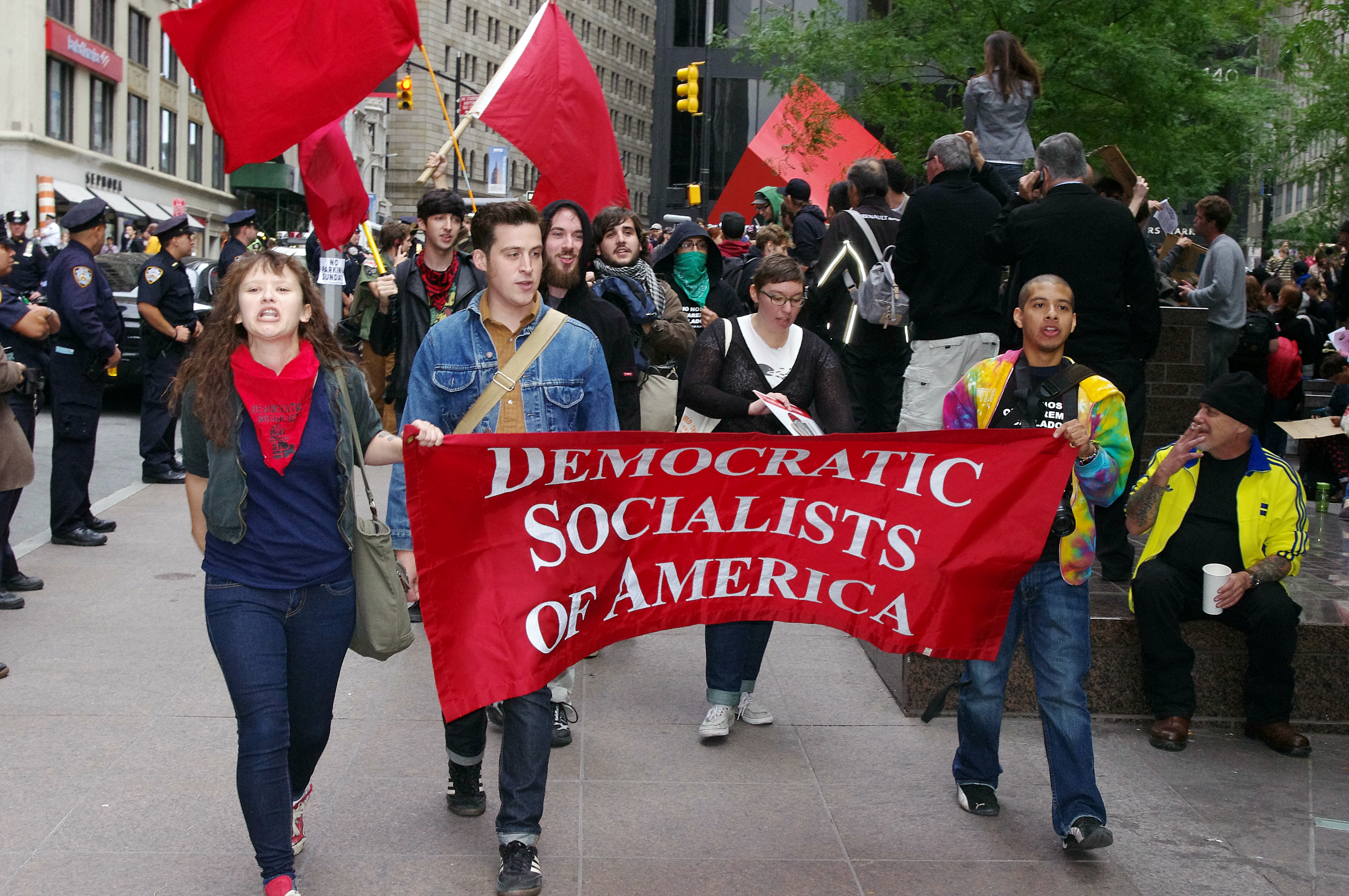
DSA activists during Occupy Wall Street, September 17, 2011

The Democratic Socialists of America (DSA) and its predecessor, the Democratic Socialist Organizing Committee had a presence in New York City since the 1980s. DSA member Ruth Messinger was elected to serve as a city councilor and later as Manhattan borough president. DSA member David Dinkins likewise served as a state assemblyman and Manhattan borough president. Representative and former state senator Major Owens was a DSA member, though City & State notes that "his socialist pursuits never garnered much attention". Brad Lander, who served as a city councilor and comptroller, was a member of DSA from 1987 to 2023. Representative Jerry Nadler was a member.

In 1989, Dinkins defeated incumbent mayor Ed Koch in the Democratic mayoral primary, going on to defeat Republican candidate Rudy Giuliani. Despite Dinkins' association with DSA, "no one attributed his mayoral victory to the organization". According to Ross Barkan in The New Republic, in Dinkins' first year as mayor, he gave a speech to the Socialist International. However, in 1993, Dinkins lost re-election to Giuliani. In 1997, Messinger won the Democratic nomination for mayor, though ultimately lost to Giuliani.

In 2011, NYC-DSA activists participated in Occupy Wall Street, which animated leftists in the city and attracted many future DSA members. In 2021, Jabari Brisport wrote in The Forge that four years prior, the chapter was holding meetings of less than 30 people in Brooklyn. Peter Sterne wrote that before 2016, NYC-DSA acted as "little more than an advocacy group".

=== Rise in influence ===
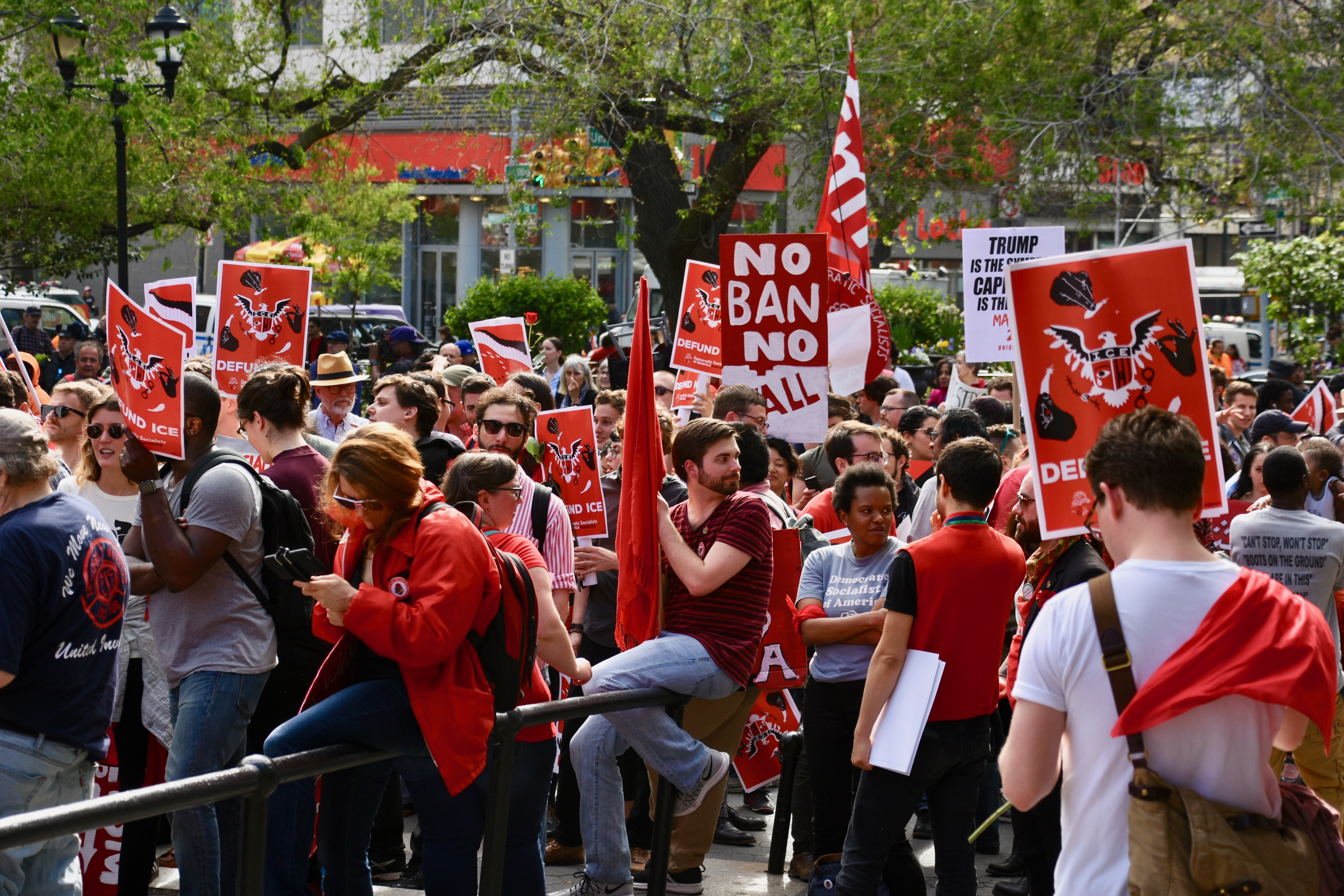
May Day DSA rally in Union Square, 2017

The chapter, like the rest of the organization, significantly grew after socialist senator Bernie Sanders' 2016 presidential campaign and the election of Donald Trump. Barkan wrote in Jacobin that Sanders' run "was almost single-handedly responsible for reviving DSA across the country and laying the groundwork for the New York City chapter's emergence as a force in local politics." Weeks after Trump's victory, NYC-DSA formed its electoral working group.

By 2017, NYC-DSA had at least 2,000 members. That year, it ran two candidates for city council: Khader El-Yateem, a Palestinian Lutheran minister, and Jabari Brisport, an actor. El-Yateem was the first Arab-American to run for city council, and tried to appeal to minority communities in City Council district 43 in southwest Brooklyn. Brisport ran on the Green Party ballot line in 35th city council district in central Brooklyn, protesting gentrification. Both focused on housing issues. Hundreds of DSA members volunteered for their campaigns. In November, Brisport lost to incumbent Laurie Cumbo with 29% of the vote, though this was the highest for an independent candidate since 2003. El-Yateem ultimately lost the Democratic primary to his opponent Justin Brannan. Carlina Rivera was a DSA member when she won her city council election that year. NYC-DSA organized with the Crown Heights Tenant Union against turning the Bedford Union Armory into luxury housing and pushed the city council to pass a police reform bill.

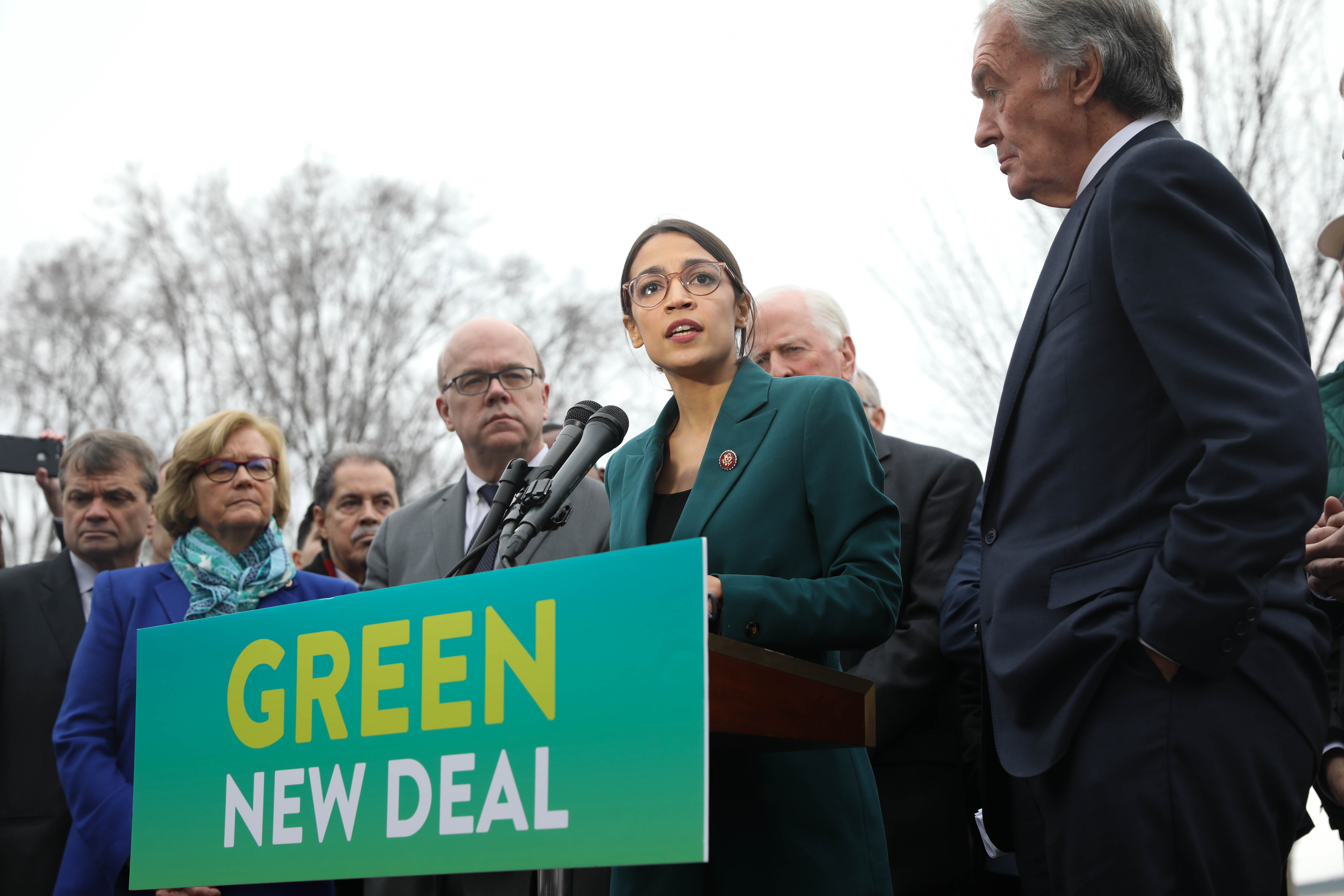
Ocasio-Cortez at a Green New Deal press conference

Hundreds of activists attended NYC-DSA's 2018 convention. The year prior, DSA activist Alexandria Ocasio-Cortez began her campaign for New York's 14th congressional district in the Bronx and Queens. She campaigned against incumbent and House Democratic Caucus Chair Joe Crowley and campaigned for Medicare For All, a jobs guarantee, free public college, and abolishing Immigration and Customs Enforcement. NYC-DSA endorsed and advised her campaign, with many members canvassing for her. In what has been described as "the most shocking upset" of the 2018 primary season, Ocasio-Cortez defeated Crowley with 57.5% of the vote. Ocasio-Cortez quickly became a national figure, and endorsed several other progressive candidates nationwide. Ocasio-Cortez defeated her Republican opponent in the November general election with 78%. Her victory contributed to an increase in DSA membership.

That year, DSA organizer Julia Salazar ran against incumbent Martin Malave Dilan in the 18th State Senate district in northern Brooklyn. After Ocasio-Cortez's win, NYC-DSA ran an "aggressive ground game" in the district. Salazar criticized gentrification and claimed Dilan contributed to the eviction crisis. Salazar defeated Dilan and won her general election. Salazar's housing bill in the state senate failed, though a separate tenant protection bill passed, partly attributed by Sam Lewis in Jacobin to progressive electoral victories. NYC-DSA also endorsed socialist city councilman Jumaane Williams for Lieutenant Governor and socialist Cynthia Nixon for Governor. Williams campaigned on criminal justice reform, gun control, and women's health. Nixon supported universal healthcare, universal rent control, and more affordable housing. Williams lost to incumbent Kathy Hochul with 46.7% of the vote, while Nixon lost to incumbent Andrew Cuomo with 35%. Williams went on to become public advocate in 2019 and unsuccessfully ran for governor in 2022.

By 2019, NYC-DSA had 5,000 members. By then, NYC-DSA had joined local mobilization against the construction of Amazon HQ2 in Long Island City, citing concerns about corporate subsidies and gentrification among other criticisms. With the support of politicians such as Ocasio-Cortez and state Senator Michael Gianaris, as well as groups like the Retail Wholesale and Department Store Union, the coalition built great public pressure against the deal. On February 14, 2019, Amazon announced that it would cancel the planned Long Island City location due to opposition, celebrated by NYC-DSA as a victory.

That year, the chapter endorsed public defender Tiffany Cabán for Queens District Attorney. Cabán ran on ending cash bail and not prosecuting "crimes of poverty", including sex work and fare evasion. DSA "brought its canvassing army" to support Cabán, while the election became a "microcosm of the Democratic Party's deepening rift between progressives and moderates". Cabán appeared to win the election and declared victory, but after a recount requested by opponent Melinda Katz, she conceded after losing by 20 votes.

=== Socialist bloc ===
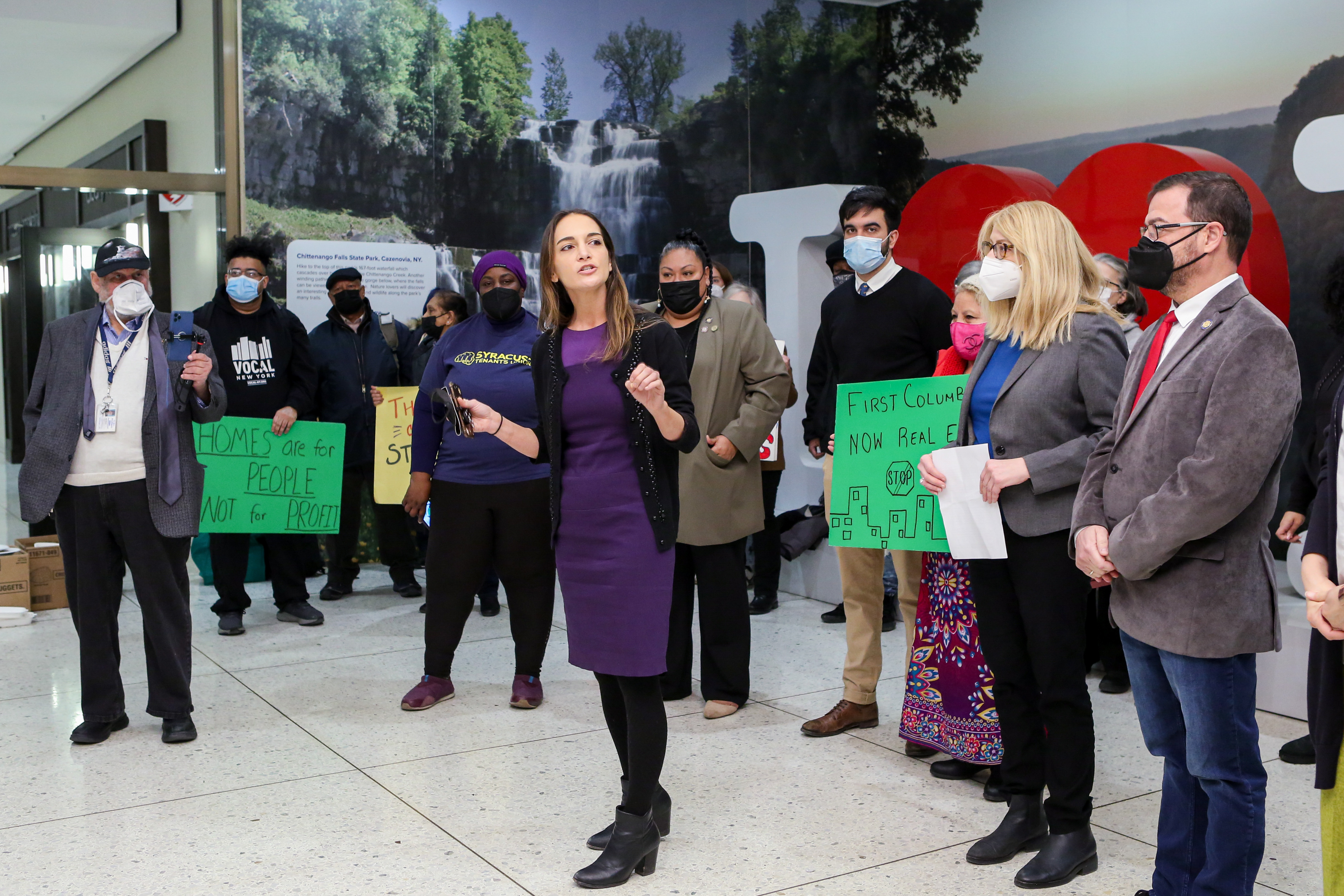
Salazar at a press conference with Mitaynes and Mamdani behind her in February 2022

By 2020, NYC-DSA had 7,000 members. The chapter supported the Black Lives Matter movement and George Floyd protests, and called for decreasing police funding to fund other services. NYC-DSA activists supported and canvassed for Sanders' 2020 presidential campaign. That year, NYC-DSA ran a slate of candidates in local races: Salazar for re-election, Brisport for state senate, and Phara Souffrant Forrest, Marcela Mitaynes, and Zohran Mamdani for state assembly. In The Nation, Raina Lipsitz wrote that "Two years after helping propel AOC to victory in Queens, NYC-DSA is taking on more races than ever before". Because of the COVID-19 pandemic, the slate's campaigns had to transition from canvassing to online activism. In the June 23 Democratic primaries, all NYC-DSA candidates defeated their opponents. The slate's "seismic" victory was attributed to the pandemic and associated economic crisis, and the reaction to police brutality. The slate won their general elections, along with unendorsed members Emily Gallagher and Jessica González-Rojas. Following the victories, the newly elected slate formed the New York State Socialists in Office parliamentary group.

That year, DSA endorsed two candidates in New York City congressional races: Samelys López in New York's 15th congressional district and Jamaal Bowman against Representative Eliot Engel in New York's 16th congressional district. López campaigned on universal healthcare, housing as a human right, and a boycott of Israel. Bowman ran on a platform of Medicare for All, a Green New Deal, and policies addressing racial issues. Bowman defeated Engel with 55.4% of the vote and won his general election with 84.2%. Ocasio-Cortez won her primary with 74.4% and her general election with 71.6%. López however lost her election, receiving 13.9%. Bowman would later face controversy from members of DSA after voting for Iron Dome funding and had his endorsement revoked by the organization in 2021. He let his membership expire over its stance on Israel in 2022. NYC-DSA also came under criticism in 2020 over the cancellation of Dr. Adolph Reed's speech to the chapter after two caucuses accused him of class reductionism, and for a questionnaire that asked candidates to boycott Israel.

NYC-DSA also ran a slate of six city council candidates in the 2021 elections, aiming to create a socialist caucus: Cabán, Alexa Avilés, Brandon West, Michael Hollingsworth, Adolfo Abreu, and Jaslin Kaur. Several other candidates ran as socialists or supported left-wing positions without an endorsement. The slate was opposed by the pro-business "Common Sense NYC" super PAC. Of the six candidates, only Cabán and Avilés won their elections. DSA members Kristin Richardson Jordan and Shahana Hanif won their city council elections, though were not endorsed by NYC-DSA. NYC-DSA did not run or endorse a candidate in the mayoral election, though Salazar endorsed Party for Socialism and Liberation candidate Cathy Rojas, and other NYC-DSA officials endorsed Maya Wiley or Dianne Morales in the primary.

In 2022, NYC-DSA ran a slate of 13 candidates, also endorsed by Ocasio-Cortez: its incumbents (Note: Forrest, Gallagher, Mamdani, Mitanyes, Brisport, and Salazar) for re-election, challengers Illapa Sairitupac, Keron Alleyne, Samy Nemir Olivares, Vanessa Agudelo, and Sarahana Shrestha (Note: Shrestha represents the 103rd district outside of the city, though she is still endorsed by NYC-DSA.) for assembly, and challengers Kristen Gonzalez and David Alexis for state senate. The endorsements were made with a particular emphasis on climate change. In the races for assembly, Mamdani, Gallagher, Mitaynes, and Forrest kept their seats, while only while Shrestha won her race out of the non-incumbent assembly candidates. In the state senate elections, mayor Eric Adams supported challengers to three DSA candidates. Brisport and Salazar won re-election, and Gonzalez won her race. Ocasio-Cortez faced no opposition. After the elections, Astoria, Queens became the only place in the country to have socialist representation at the city, state, and federal level, becoming known as "The People's Republic of Astoria".

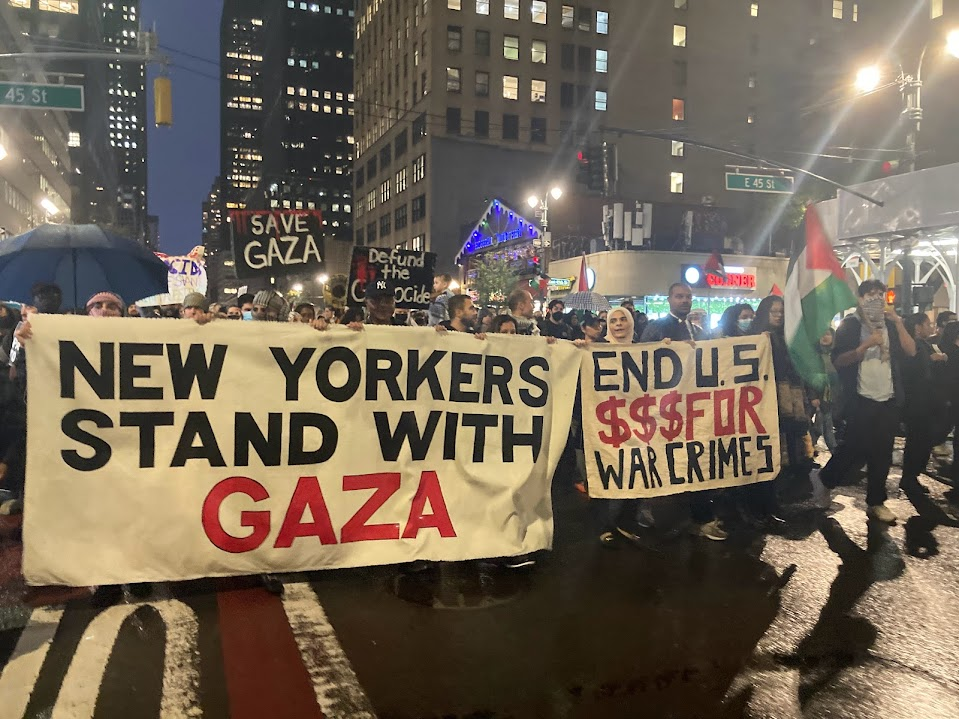
An NYC-DSA Gaza war protest

In 2023, NYC-DSA faced condemnation from many elected officials for promoting the "All Out for Palestine" rally after the October 7 attacks. NYC-DSA later distanced itself from the rally. A resolution condemning NYC-DSA was introduced in the House on October 11, alleging support of the attack. The chapter took a pro-Palestinian stance during the Gaza war. Earlier that year, Mamdani was the keynote speaker at the national DSA convention. The "Build Public Renewables Act" passed the assembly, which ordered the New York Power Authority to move away from electricity and toward renewable energy. The bill was "a product of years of advocacy" from the chapter. By January 2024, NYC-DSA faced technical and legal disputes over campaign funding in the 2022 elections and a budget deficit in the national DSA. During the Biden administration, NYC-DSA membership declined, with only 5,910 members by October 2024.

In 2024, DSA city councilors Cabán, Avilés, and Hanif voted against the city budget in protest, saying it was insufficient for the working class. In April, eight NYC-DSA state legislators signed onto a letter supporting the Gaza Solidarity Encampment at Columbia University and other college protests. Ocasio-Cortez and Bowman visited the Columbia encampment, and the Young Democratic Socialists of America participated in the "Columbia University Apartheid Divest". In June, Bowman attempted to make amends with DSA and said he wouldn't support Iron Dome funding, gaining back NYC-DSA's endorsement. Ocasio-Cortez was also seen by some DSA members as less committed to Palestine, losing her national endorsement but keeping NYC-DSA's. NYC-DSA supported the "Leave it Blank" campaign in the Democratic presidential primary to protest the Gaza war. That year, NYC-DSA endorsed its incumbents (Note: Bowman, Ocasio-Cortez, Gonzalez, Mamdani, Brisport, Gallagher, Mitanyes, Salazar, Forest, and Shrestha) and non-incumbent candidates Eon Huntley, Claire Valdez, and Jonathan Soto for assembly. Bowman ultimately lost his primary to George Latimer. Huntley and Soto lost their races as well. All other NYC-DSA incumbents kept their seats, and Valdez won her race. The elections were described as a "mixed bag" for progressives and socialists. NYC-DSA supported the "City of Yes" housing bill. In early 2025, NYC-DSA organized a rally to protest NYU Langone denying gender-affirming care to minors.

=== Mamdani campaign ===
In October 2024, Mamdani announced he would run for mayor in the 2025 Democratic primary on a progressive and socialist platform. Mamdani's campaign focused on affordability, proposing a rent freeze for rent stabilized units, free bus service, universal child care, city-run grocery stores, building social housing, and raising taxes on the rich. Some NYC-DSA elected officials doubted success, though 81% of members and 90% of delegates voted to endorse him at the 2024 convention. Mamdani was viewed as a "cadre" candidate for NYC-DSA, having strong pre-existing connections to the chapter.

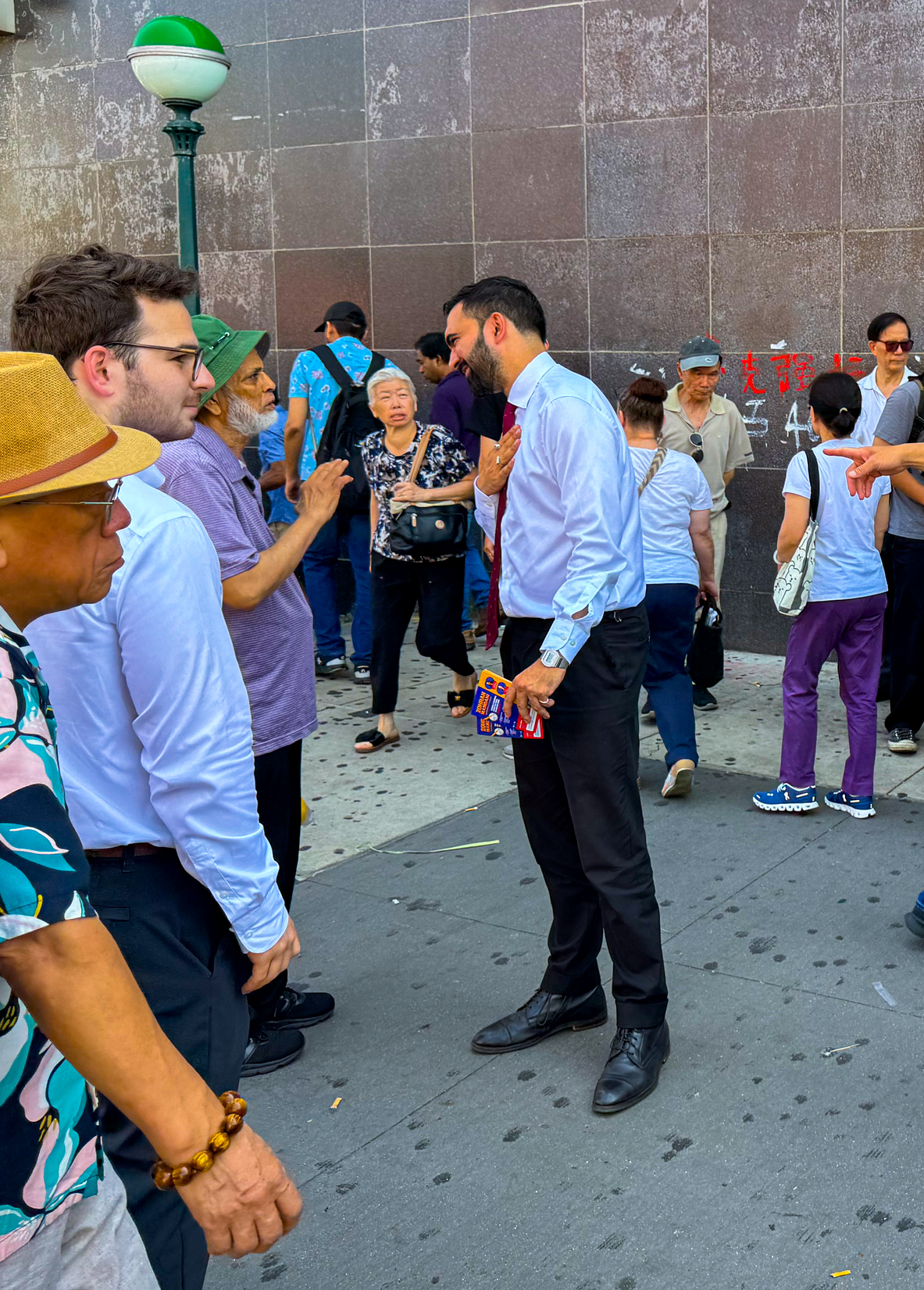
Mamdani campaigning in Flushing, Queens in June 2025

Mamdani steadily gained in polls, becoming second place to former Governor Andrew Cuomo and outright leading in some. Mamdani was supported by many progressives and socialists, while Cuomo was supported by the Democratic establishment. Throughout the campaign, volunteers for Mamdani knocked on over one million doors, largely coordinated with NYC-DSA. Cuomo criticized Mamdani for his identity as a socialist and association with DSA. He was criticized by the political right and center, mainly for his support of socialist policies and criticism of Israel. The chapter gained 2,400 members between the start of the campaign by late May. Mamdani's campaign came at a time where the base of the Democratic Party was increasingly open to socialist ideas, in response to the perceived ineffectiveness of the establishment following Trump's 2024 election win.

On June 24, Mamdani pulled off an upset victory, leading Cuomo with 43.5% of the vote to his 36.3% in the first round of voting, a margin which "virtually no pollster predicted". Cuomo conceded the race later that night, leaving Mamdani the presumptive nominee. Ranked choice results released on July 1 showed Mamdani with 56% of the vote, officially winning the primary. The youthful, multiracial, leftist neighborhoods in Brooklyn and Queens where Mamdani overperformed became known as the "Commie Corridor". NYC-DSA was described after the victory as "the most dynamic and powerful left-wing organization in the country" and a powerful local electoral machine. NYC-DSA members Hanif and Avilés also won their primaries. NYC-DSA membership significantly increased after the victory, and contributed to an increase in national DSA membership. In July, the chapter reached a membership of 10,000. The chapter grew to 11,000 members by August. Shortly after the primary, progressive city councilman Chi Ossé joined DSA. Leaders of the chapter's social housing campaign supported pro-rezoning ballot proposals 2 through 5.

In the general election, Mamdani faced Cuomo (running as an independent) and Republican Curtis Sliwa. Incumbent mayor Eric Adams and candidate Jim Walden dropped out of the race to help coalesce anti-Mamdani voters around Cuomo. Establishment Democrats were reluctant to endorse Mamdani, though many ultimately did. President Trump officially endorsed Cuomo on the eve of Election Day. By the end of the campaign, volunteers for Mamdani knocked on over 3 million doors. On November 3, Mamdani won the election with 50.4% of the vote to Cuomo's 41.6% and Sliwa's 7.2%. Mamdani surpassed one million votes, in the highest turnout election since 1969. Mamdani's victory was celebrated by the Left internationally, but drew condemnation from Republicans and pro-Israel politicians. Mamdani, during his victory speech, said: "I am young, despite my best efforts to grow older. I am Muslim. I am a democratic socialist. And most damning of all, I refuse to apologize for any of this." Avilés and Hanif both won re-election. NYC-DSA celebrated the win, and gave Mamdani "wider-than-normal berth" to govern and deviate from its policies.

=== Mamdani mayoralty and 2026 slate ===
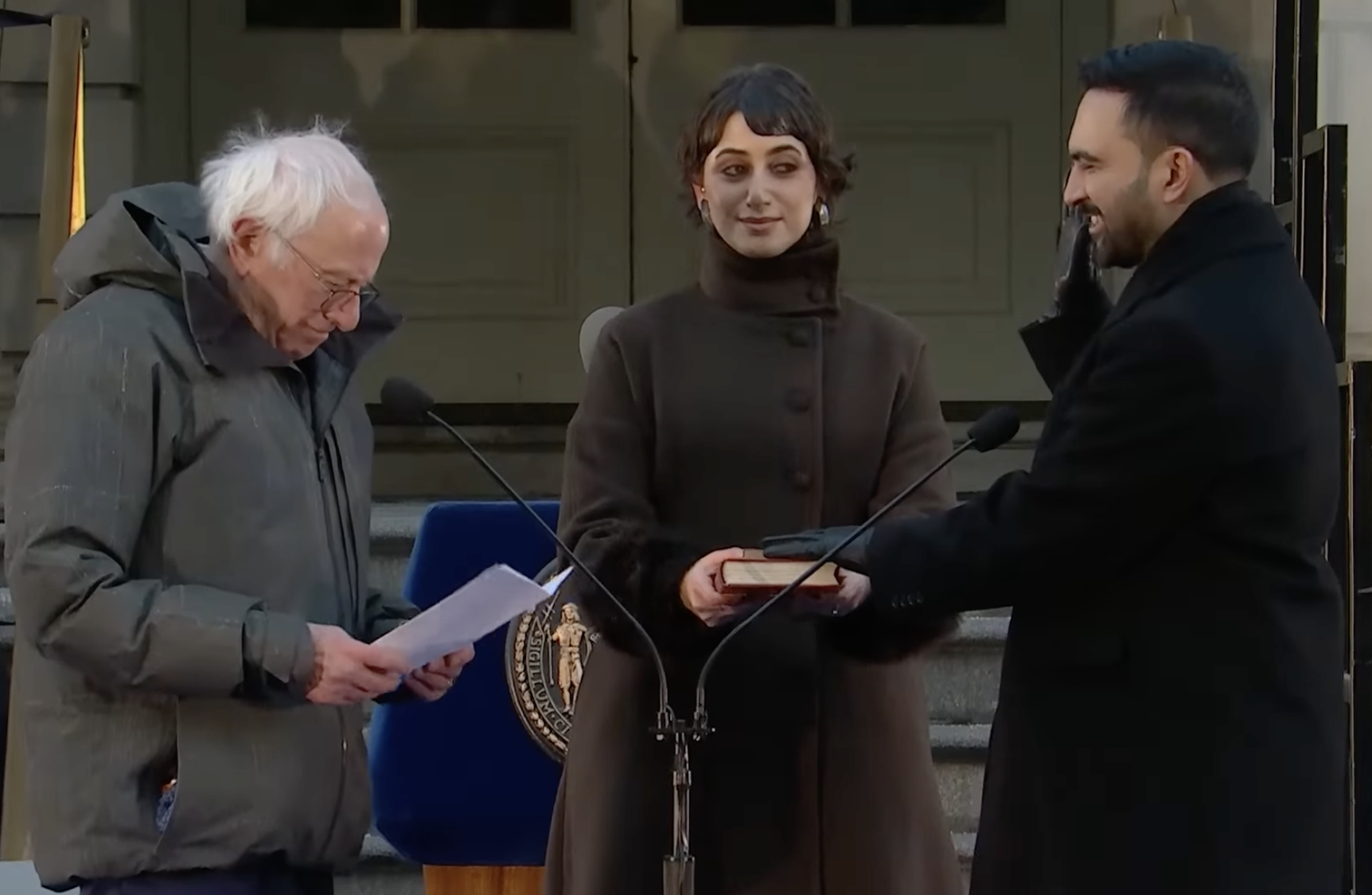
Mamdani being sworn in as mayor by Bernie Sanders

By November, NYC-DSA had 12,000 members. On January 1, 2026, Mamdani officially became the 112th mayor of New York City. At his inauguration, he was ceremonially sworn in by Sanders, and pledged to govern "audaciously" and not abandon his democratic socialist beliefs. Mamdani appointed multiple NYC-DSA members to positions in his administration: Elle Bisgaard-Church to be his chief of staff, Tascha Van Auken to the new Office of Mass Engagement (OME), and Cea Weaver to the newly reinstated Mayor's Office to Protect Tenants. As of 2026, Mamdani's administration has made minor reforms, secured additional childcare funding, closed the city's budget deficit, announced an affordable housing plan, mobilized the OME using DSA-style canvassing, and appointed new members of the Rent Guidelines Board who voted to freeze rents for rent-stabilized units. Mamdani's favorability rating has risen over time, though remains a somewhat polarizing figure.

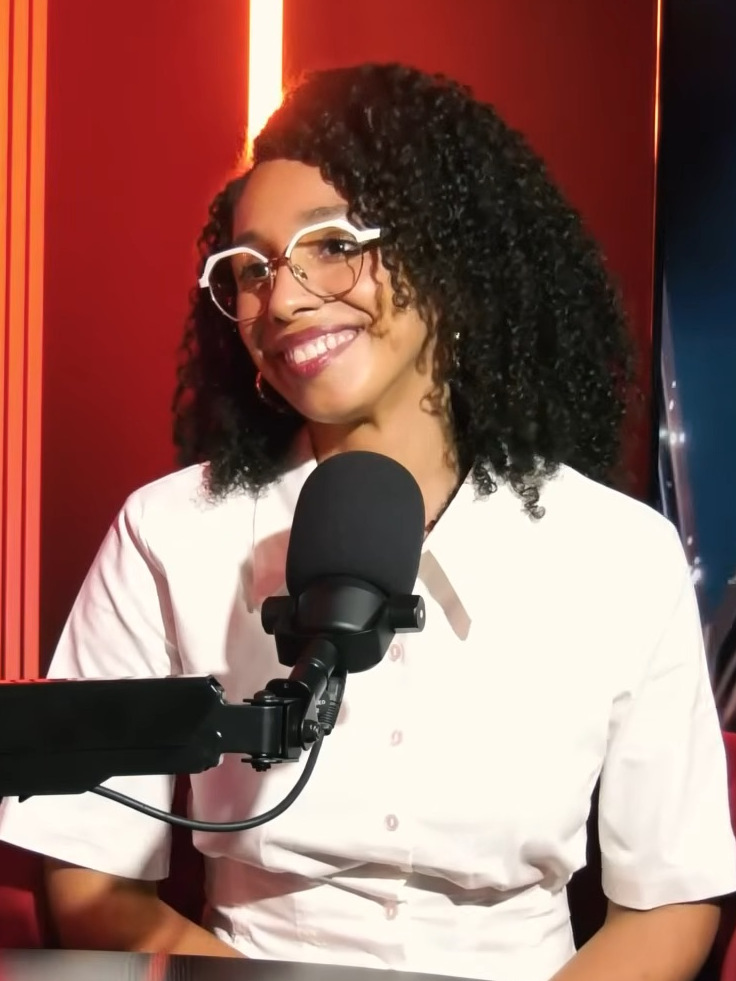
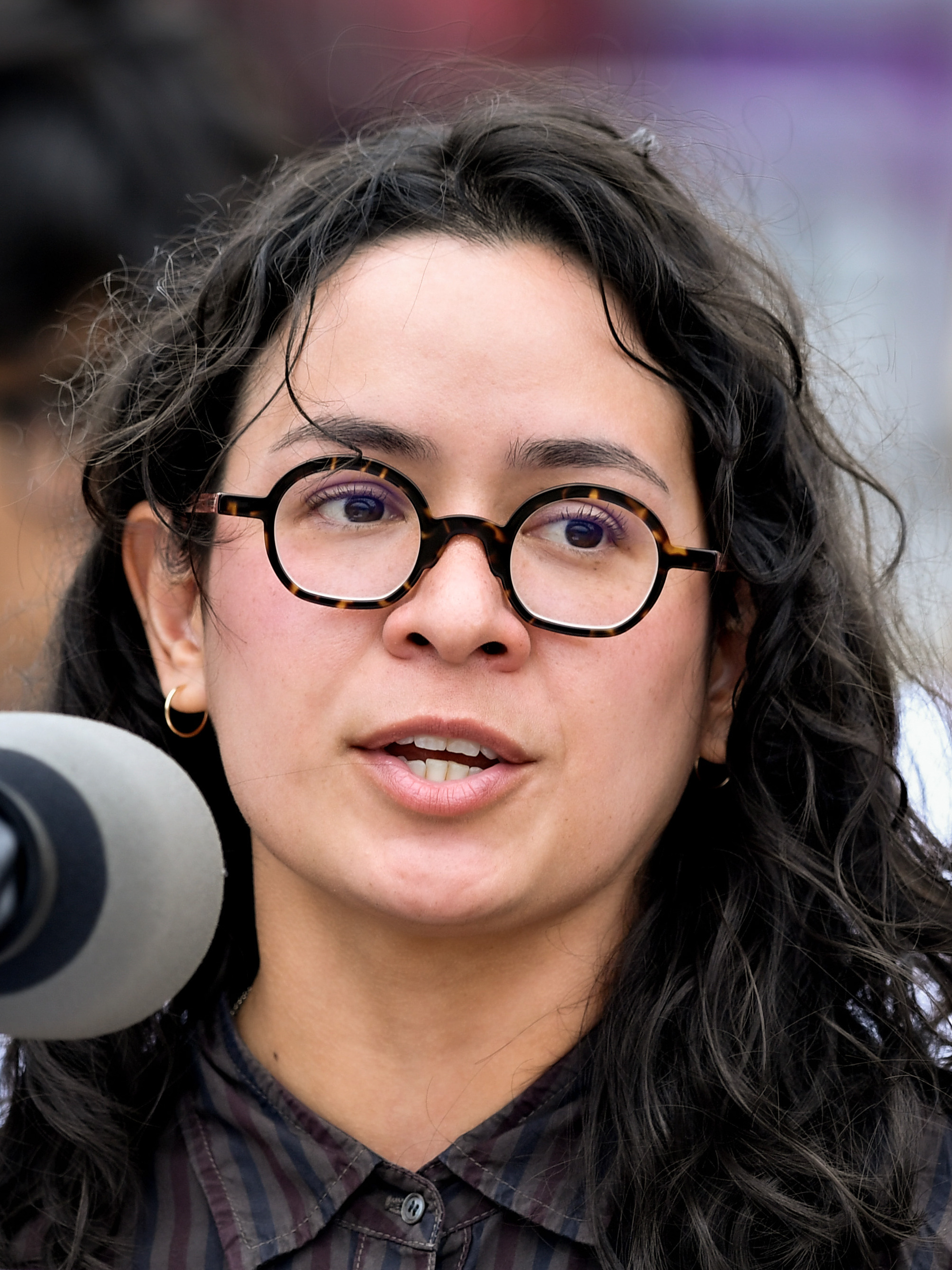
NYC-DSA's congressional slate, Darializa Avila Chevalier (left) and Claire Valdez (right)

By February 2026, NYC-DSA announced the chapter had reached 14,000 members. On February 20, Ossé and Hanif officially joined the chapter's city SIO bloc. NYC-DSA supported a moratorium on new artificial intelligence (AI) datacenters, and Gonzalez's statewide moratorium bill was signed by Governor Hochul in July. After committing at an NYC-DSA forum to oppose defensive weapons to Israel and the IHRA definition of antisemitism, Ocasio-Cortez was re-endorsed on April 8. For the 2026 elections, NYC-DSA endorsed Huntley, Christian Celeste Tate, David Orkin, Conrad Blackburn, Diana Moreno, Samantha Kattan, and Illapa Sairitupac for assembly, and Aber Kawas for state senate, along with its incumbents. (Note: Salazar, Gonzalez, Brisport, Gallagher, Forrest, Mitanyes) For Congress, NYC-DSA endorsed Valdez against progressive Antonio Reynoso, and Columbia encampment organizer Darializa Avila Chevalier against incumbent and Congressional Hispanic Caucus Chair Adriano Espaillat. The races drew outside super PAC spending and debates over gentrification, the Gaza war, and the mayoral primary. Mamdani ultimately endorsed both congressional candidates and coordinated with Ocasio-Cortez to "split up" the slate, collectively endorsing 9 out of 10 candidates. Mamdani conflicted with the chapter early on. (Note: Mamdani urged NYC-DSA members not to endorse Chi Ossé's congressional campaign. Mamdani endorsed Brad Lander over the chapter-endorsed Alexa Avilés congressional campaign. Mamdani attempted to "box out" Tiffany Cabán by endorsing Claire Valdez in NY-07. Mamdani also endorsed Hochul for re-election, while some DSA electeds endorsed her opponent Antonio Delgado or stayed neutral. Ossé, Avilés, Cabán, and Delgado all decided not to run for higher office.)

On June 23, NYC-DSA-endorsed candidate won nine of the ten primaries they contested. Avila Chevalier defeated Espaillat by 3.5 points in another upset, drawing national attention due to her far-left views. Valdez defeated Reynoso by about 20 points in the "Commie Corridor"-based district, despite his endorsements from the WFP and outgoing representative Nydia Velázquez. NYC-DSA's non-incumbent candidates Moreno, Huntley, Celeste Tate, Orkin, Kattan, Sairitupac, and Kawas, and all incumbents won their elections, with only Blackburn losing. Unendorsed DSA members González-Rojas and Brian Romero also won their elections. Upstate, legislative DSA endorsees Adam Bojak and Maurice Brown led in their elections, while other incumbents were defeated. All of Mamdani's endorsed candidates won, including Lander against incumbent Dan Goldman. During the primaries, around 8,500 NYC-DSA members volunteered as canvassers, with over 810,000 households reached. Mamdani said his win a year prior was just "the beginning" of a political movement. The New York Times wrote that the results solidified DSA's position as a "formidable force" and Mamdani as the "unquestioned political kingmaker" of New York City. Republicans interpreted the results as a shift toward Marxism and communism in the Democratic Party, while the Democratic establishment and centrists grew increasingly hostile to DSA. In July, NYC-DSA's leadership criticized the national DSA's decision not to hold a membership poll for the 2028 presidential election. NYC-DSA leaders encouraged Ocasio-Cortez to run for president. NYC-DSA candidates won their November 3 general elections, and Gordillo declared at an election night watch party, after nationwide Democratic and leftist wins, that "2028 is ours for the taking".

On October 7, Mamdani was protested at an "Israelis for Peace" vigil by pro-Palestinian activists, including local chapters of YDSA, who criticized his and the city's policies surrounding the conflict and protests. On October 8, Mamdani was criticized for the NYPD's response to the ICE shooting of Oscar Belgal, which was characterized as collaborating with ICE and being aggressive towards protesters. NYC-DSA and Avila Chevalier called on Mamdani to fire Police Commissioner Jessica Tisch.

== Ideology ==
Citywide Leadership Committee

Structure
- Seats: 71
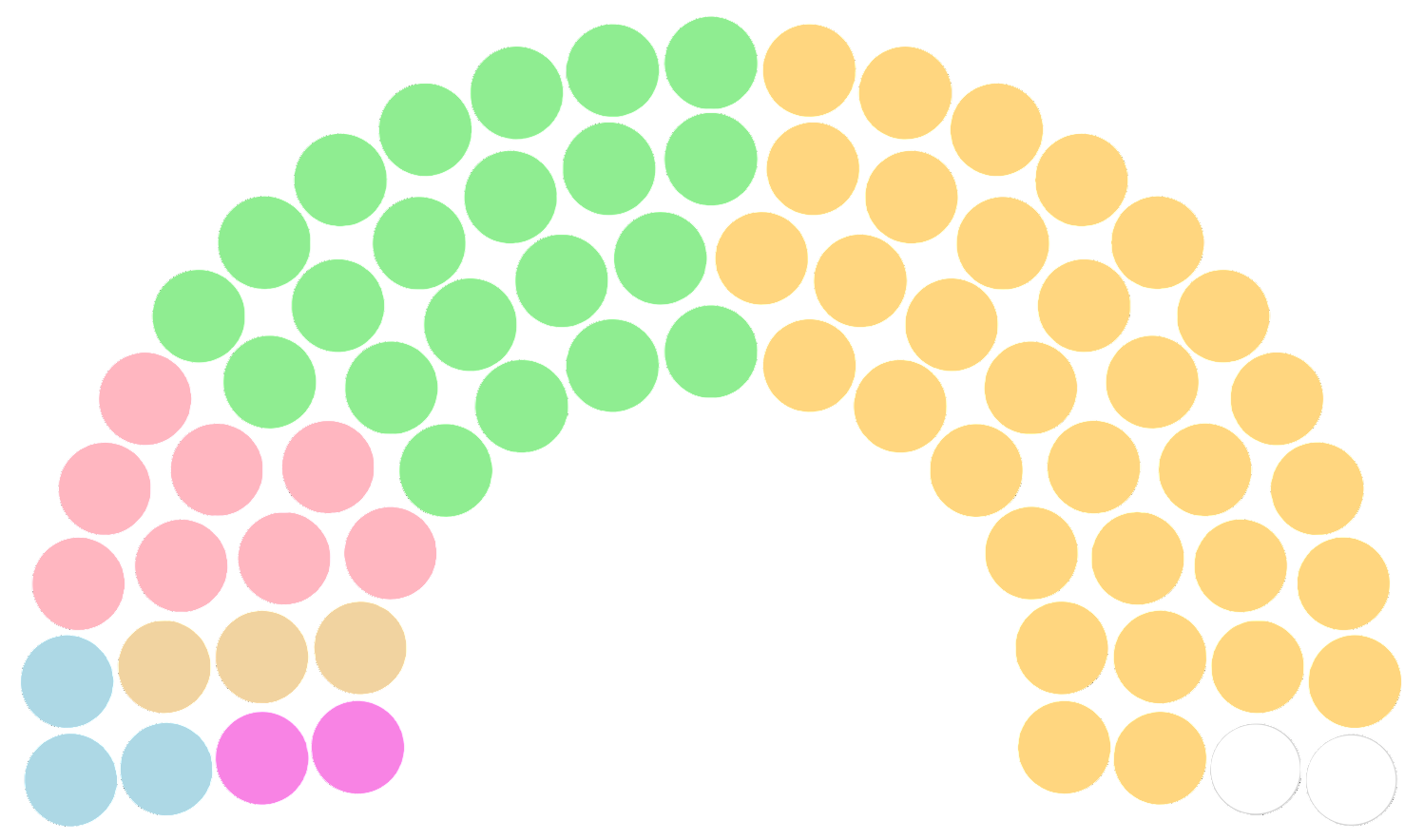
- Political groups: Socialist Majority Caucus (32); Groundwork (21); Emerge (8); Bread and Roses (3); Marxist Unity Group (3); Springs of Revolution (2); Independent (2)

The NYC-DSA Socialists in Office (SIO) committee platform includes: transferring to green energy, criminal justice reform, wealth redistribution, public banking, abortion rights, tenant protections, funding NYCHA and public transit, and universal healthcare, childcare, and education. NYC-DSA ultimately believes in Karl Marx's criticism of capitalism, and advocates for universal public goods and corporations controlled by workers. However, its short-term focus is progressive reforms. NYC-DSA takes an anti-imperialist, anti-colonialist, and anti-nationalist stance, which it says includes anti-Zionism in the Israeli–Palestinian conflict.

Multiple DSA caucuses hold influence in NYC-DSA. NYC-DSA is led mainly by "DSA Right" caucuses like the Socialist Majority Caucus and Groundwork, which won about 60% of chapter delegates, while "DSA Center" caucuses like Bread and Roses and "DSA Left" caucuses like Emerge, Marxist Unity Group, and Springs of Revolution together won about 36%. The more reformist right caucuses support working within the Democratic Party, while the more radical center and left factions are skeptical of electoralism and support an independent party. According to City and State, though there is much internal debate about DSA's orientation toward the Democratic Party, NYC-DSA has adopted the strategy of running candidates as Democrats to be viable while building independent party infrastructure.

The right flank supported re-endorsing Ocasio-Cortez in 2024, but eventually supported NYC-DSA withdrawing its endorsement request from the National Political Committee (NPC) after it imposed conditions. The left flank opposed endorsing her and wanted the NPC to decide. Ultimately, national DSA didn't endorse Ocasio-Cortez while NYC-DSA did, with the left flank on the NPC criticizing her stance on Palestine. In 2026, NYC-DSA members overwhelmingly voted to endorse Ocasio-Cortez after she committed to not support defensive aid to Israel, though Emerge and Springs of Revolution argued against it. Similarly, many members of NYC-DSA and the right-flank support a potential Ocasio-Cortez presidential run in 2028 and supported a membership poll to inform DSA's endorsement process, while the left flank was skeptical of Ocasio-Cortez and wanted further deliberation. When the left caucuses on the NPC decided not to hold a membership poll, NYC-DSA leadership strongly criticized it and temporarily floated seceding. NYC-DSA leadership, led mainly by Socialist Majority and Groundwork, tends to avoid publicly criticizing Mamdani, but Emerge and Marxist Unity Group called on him to fire NYPD Commissioner Tisch.

== Demographics ==
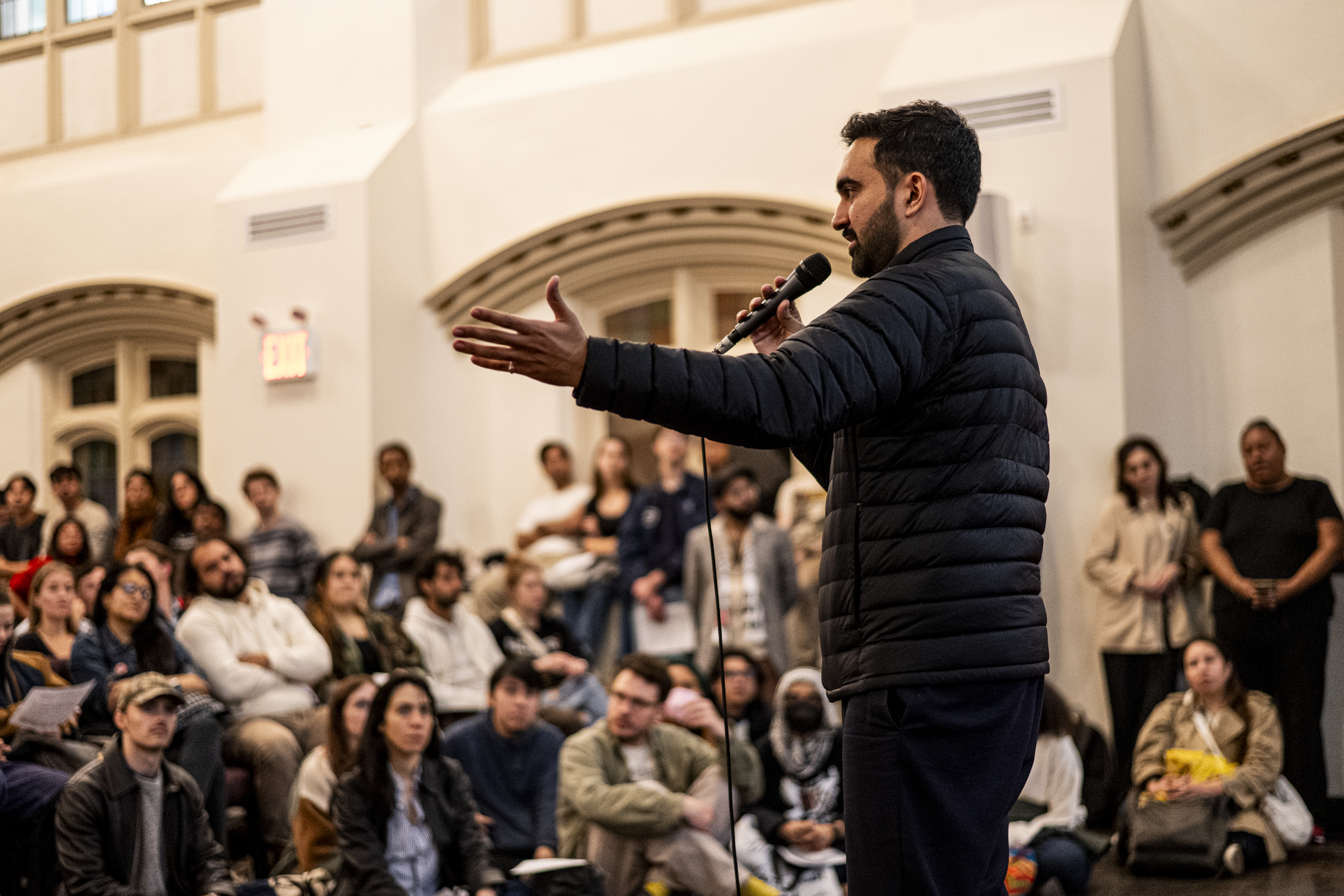
Mamdani speaking at an NYC-DSA meeting for new members in 2024

NYC-DSA's most consistent base of support comes from young renters. In 2025, Zach Williams of City and State criticized NYC-DSA as appealing to "gentrifiers" and young professionals in the city, arguing it had limited appeal with blue-collar workers. Michael Carter argued in Jacobin that establishment Democratic policies fueled gentrification, impacting new and existing residents and pushing them to Mamdani. NYC-DSA performs well in gentrified whiter neighborhoods, but has won support with nonwhite voters in certain elections.

The "Mamdani coalition" of 2025 and 2026 included young voters across demographics. In 2026, The New York Times noted several economic factors that fueled NYC-DSA's rise, including rising costs of living including rent, fear of job displacement from AI, layoffs in white-collar industries, growing unemployment among young people and college graduates, and a general sense of precarity, instability, and too much government spending on wars. Similarly, political analyst Nate Silver identified highly-educated but lower-income voters as the base for DSA and progressives during elections in Michigan, Maine, and New York.

While national DSA was largely white, 40% of NYC-DSA members in 2026 are nonwhite, according to Mausser. Professor Fabian Holt, who wrote the book Organize or Burn about the chapter's climate efforts, said the chapter was majority white but was more diverse than its critics alleged. In August 2026, NYC-DSA released a detailed demographic survey showing that its membership was 60% white, 14% Hispanic, 12% Jewish, 10% Asian, 9% Black, 5% South Asian, 4% Middle Eastern, 2% Native American, and <1% Pacific Islander. The chapter is less diverse than the national Democratic Party and New York City itself, but is less white than national DSA and gradually becoming more diverse.

== Local conventions ==
NYC-DSA held annual conventions until 2022, when it switched to even-year biannual conventions.

Date	Location	Notes
November 14, 2026	TBD	TBD
October 19, 2024	The Church of the Village	150 elected delegates attended. Convention endorsed Zohran Mamdani for mayor, with 81% of members and 90% of delegates voting in favor. Mamdani and Salazar spoke at the convention.: Convention landing page
October 22, 2022	Unitarian Church of All Souls	"around 200 delegates" attended
September 25, 2021	hybrid: Upper West Side and Zoom	India Walton was the keynote speaker.: Convention Bulletin #1, #2
August 15, 2020	online (Zoom)	130 elected delegates. Rescheduled and held remotely due to COVID-19.: Convention landing page; Convention Bulletin #6
June 1, 2019	Judson Memorial Church	151 elected delegates.: Convention landing page
May 5, 2018	Judson Memorial Church	First convention after AOC's primary upset and NYC-DSA's rapid growth. 201 elected delegates and "hundreds of activists" attended. Speakers included AOC and Julia Salazar.: Convention landing page
May 6, 2017	Judson Memorial Church	The first Citywide Leadership Committee (CLC) was elected in September 2017.: Convention poster

=== Chapter leadership ===
Years	Title	Name	Ref
2015–2017	Co-chair	Rahel Biru	
2016	Co-chair	Margarita Hernandez	
2017	Co-chair	Zelig Stern	
2018	Co-chair	Abdullah Younus	
2018–2019	Co-chair	Bianca Cunningham	
2019–2021	Co-chair	Chi Anunwa	
2020–2022	Co-chair	Sumathy Kumar	
2022–2023	Co-chair	Jeremy Cohan	
2023	Co-chair	Kaarthika Thakker	
2024–2026	Co-chair	Gustavo Gordillo	
2024–2026	Co-chair	Grace Mausser	

== Election results ==
=== Federal ===
Year	Candidate	Office	District	Stage	Votes	%	Result	DSA	Note	Ref
2026	Alexandria Ocasio-Cortez	House	NY-14	General	TBD	TBD	TBD	member, endorsee (Note: In 2024, national DSA withdrew its endorsement of AOC after the primary. AOC retained NYC-DSA's endorsement.)		
2026	Claire Valdez	House	NY-7	General	TBD	TBD	TBD	member, endorsee		
2026	Darializa Avila Chevalier	House	NY-13	General	TBD	TBD	TBD	member, endorsee		
2026	Alexandria Ocasio-Cortez	House	NY-14	Dem primary	30,189	86.94%	Won	member, endorsee		
2026	Claire Valdez	House	NY-7	Dem primary	37,531	56.06%	Won	member, endorsee		
2026	Darializa Avila Chevalier	House	NY-13	Dem primary	32,790	49.40%	Won	member, endorsee		
2024	Alexandria Ocasio-Cortez	House	NY-14	General	132,714	69.2%	Won	member, endorsee		
2024	Alexandria Ocasio-Cortez	House	NY-14	Dem primary	19,070	82.1%	Won	member, endorsee		
2024	Jamaal Bowman	House	NY-16	Dem primary	32,440	41.41%	Lost	member, endorsee (Note: Bowman was endorsed by Lower Hudson Valley DSA (LHV DSA) in 2020. In 2021, Bowman was sharply criticized by DSA's national Steering Committee for voting to send Iron Dome missiles to Israel. In 2022, Bowman did not seek an endorsement from LHV DSA or NYC-DSA, and allowed his membership to lapse. In 2024, Bowman rejoined DSA, and was endorsed by NYC-DSA in 2024 after committing not to vote for military aid to Israel.)		
2022	Alexandria Ocasio-Cortez	House	NY-14	General	82,453	70.72%	Won	member, endorsee		
2022	Jamaal Bowman	House	NY-16	General	140,098	64.3%	Won	non-member, non-endorsee		
2022	Alexandria Ocasio-Cortez	House	NY-14	Dem primary	N/A	N/A	Won	member, endorsee	unopposed	
2022	Jamaal Bowman	House	NY-16	Dem primary	21,643	54.2%	Won	non-member, non-endorsee		
2020	Alexandria Ocasio-Cortez	House	NY-14	General	152,661	71.6%	Won	member, endorsee		
2020	Jamaal Bowman	House	NY-16	General	218,471	84.2%	Won	member, endorsee		
2020	Alexandria Ocasio-Cortez	House	NY-14	Dem primary	46,582	74.6%	Won	member, endorsee		
2020	Jamaal Bowman	House	NY-16	Dem primary	84,370	55.4%	Won	member, endorsee		
2020	Samelys López	House	NY-15	Dem primary	14,755	13.7%	Lost	member, endorsee		
2018	Alexandria Ocasio-Cortez	House	NY-14	General	110,318	78.18%	Won	member, endorsee		
2018	Alexandria Ocasio-Cortez	House	NY-14	Dem primary	15,897	57.13%	Won	member, endorsee		

=== Statewide ===
Year	Candidate	Office	Stage	Votes	%	Result	DSA	Note	Ref
2018	Cynthia Nixon	Governor	Dem primary	512,585	34.4%	Lost	member, endorsee		
2018	Jumaane Williams	Lieutenant Governor	Dem primary	691,324	46.7%	Lost	member, endorsee		

=== State legislature ===
Year	Candidate	Office	District	Stage	Votes	%	Result	DSA	Note	Ref
2026	Aber Kawas	Senate	SD-12	General	TBD	TBD	TBD	member, endorsee (Note: In 2026, Kawas was originally endorsed for Assembly District 34, but switched to Senate District 12.)		
2026	Christian Celeste Tate	Assembly	AD-54	General	TBD	TBD	TBD	member, endorsee		
2026	David Orkin	Assembly	AD-38	General	TBD	TBD	TBD	member, endorsee		
2026	Diana Moreno	Assembly	AD-36	General	TBD	TBD	TBD	member, endorsee		
2026	Eon Huntley	Assembly	AD-56	General	TBD	TBD	TBD	member, endorsee		
2026	Illapa Sairitupac	Assembly	AD-65	General	TBD	TBD	TBD	member, endorsee		
2026	Samantha Kattan	Assembly	AD-37	General	TBD	TBD	TBD	member, endorsee		
2026	Aber Kawas	Senate	SD-12	Dem primary	12,460	60.1%	Won	member, endorsee		
2026	Christian Celeste Tate	Assembly	AD-54	Dem primary	4,054	61.9%	Won	member, endorsee		
2026	Conrad Blackburn	Assembly	AD-70	Dem primary	6,236	45.7%	Lost	member, endorsee		
2026	David Orkin	Assembly	AD-38	Dem primary	3,722	58.8%	Won	member, endorsee		
2026	Diana Moreno	Assembly	AD-36	Dem primary	9,051	78.3%	Won	member, endorsee		
2026	Eon Huntley	Assembly	AD-56	Dem primary	8,438	58.3%	Won	member, endorsee		
2026	Illapa Sairitupac	Assembly	AD-65	Dem primary	4,140	36.5%	Won	member, endorsee		
2026	Samantha Kattan	Assembly	AD-37	Dem primary	7,636	66.8%	Won	member, endorsee		
2026	Diana Moreno	Assembly	AD-36	Special election	6,472	74.1%	Won	member, endorsee		
2026	Jessica González-Rojas	Senate	SD-13	Dem primary	6,476	46.80%	Won	member, non-endorsee		
2026	Brian Romero	Assembly	AD-34	Dem primary	4,916	61.79%	Won	member, non-endorsee		
2026	Emily Gallagher	Assembly	AD-50	Dem primary	11,019	65.14%	Won	member, endorsee		
2026	Marcela Mitaynes	Assembly	AD-51	Dem primary	N/A	N/A	Won	member, endorsee	unopposed	
2026	Phara Souffrant Forrest	Assembly	AD-57	Dem primary	12,400	70.63%	Won	member, endorsee		
2026	Julia Salazar	Senate	SD-18	Dem primary	N/A	N/A	Won	member, endorsee	unopposed	
2026	Jabari Brisport	Senate	SD-25	Dem primary	8,921	79.9%	Won	member, endorsee		
2026	Kristen Gonzalez	Senate	SD-59	Dem primary	N/A	N/A	Won	member, endorsee	unopposed	
2024	Claire Valdez	Assembly	AD-37	General	34,293	98.5%	Won	member, endorsee		
2024	Emily Gallagher	Assembly	AD-50	General	36,598	98.0%	Won	member, endorsee		
2024	Jabari Brisport	Senate	SD-25	General	90,484	99.4%	Won	member, endorsee		
2024	Julia Salazar	Senate	SD-18	General	67,889	99.1%	Won	member, endorsee		
2024	Kristen Gonzalez	Senate	SD-59	General	100,073	98.9%	Won	member, endorsee		
2024	Marcela Mitaynes	Assembly	AD-51	General	22,007	76.8%	Won	member, endorsee		
2024	Phara Souffrant Forrest	Assembly	AD-57	General	47,424	99.3%	Won	member, endorsee		
2024	Sarahana Shrestha	Assembly	AD-103	General	46,993	64.1%	Won	member, endorsee (Note: Shrestha represents a district outside New York City and their primary endorsement is Mid-Hudson Valley DSA.)		
2024	Zohran Mamdani	Assembly	AD-36	General	37,911	98.5%	Won	member, endorsee		
2024	Claire Valdez	Assembly	AD-37	Dem primary	4,075	58.6%	Won	member, endorsee		
2024	Emily Gallagher	Assembly	AD-50	Dem primary	4,652	75.0%	Won	member, endorsee		
2024	Eon Huntley	Assembly	AD-56	Dem primary	4,126	47.0%	Lost	member, endorsee		
2024	Jonathan Soto	Assembly	AD-82	Dem primary	3,612	38.0%	Lost	member, endorsee		
2024	Kristen Gonzalez	Senate	SD-59	Dem primary	14,870	85.1%	Won	member, endorsee		
2024	Sarahana Shrestha	Assembly	AD-103	Dem primary	9,219	66.2%	Won	member, endorsee		
2022	Emily Gallagher	Assembly	AD-50	General	27,045	97.7%	Won	member, endorsee		
2022	Jabari Brisport	Senate	SD-25	General	63,017	99.5%	Won	member, endorsee		
2022	Julia Salazar	Senate	SD-18	General	43,255	98.6%	Won	member, endorsee		
2022	Kristen Gonzalez	Senate	SD-59	General	69,050	98.9%	Won	member, endorsee		
2022	Marcela Mitaynes	Assembly	AD-51	General	15,174	78.5%	Won	member, endorsee		
2022	Phara Souffrant Forrest	Assembly	AD-57	General	36,232	99.4%	Won	member, endorsee		
2022	Sarahana Shrestha	Assembly	AD-103	General	36,605	60.7%	Won	member, endorsee	Mid-Hudson Valley DSA	
2022	Zohran Mamdani	Assembly	AD-36	General	24,090	98.6%	Won	member, endorsee		
2022	David Alexis	Senate	SD-21	Dem primary	7,047	37.7%	Lost	endorsee		
2022	Emily Gallagher	Assembly	AD-50	Dem primary	6,634	79.5%	Won	member, endorsee		
2022	Illapa Sairitupac	Assembly	AD-65	Dem primary	3,305	34.5%	Lost	member, endorsee		
2022	Jabari Brisport	Senate	SD-25	Dem primary	12,492	70.4%	Won	member, endorsee		
2022	Keron Alleyne	Assembly	AD-60	Dem primary	1,873	27.3%	Lost	endorsee		
2022	Kristen Gonzalez	Senate	SD-59	Dem primary	13,770	57.8%	Won	member, endorsee		
2022	Marcela Mitaynes	Assembly	AD-51	Dem primary	4,573	81.5%	Won	member, endorsee		
2022	Phara Souffrant Forrest	Assembly	AD-57	Dem primary	9,495	67.3%	Won	member, endorsee		
2022	Samy Nemir Olivares	Assembly	AD-54	Dem primary	2,313	47.7%	Lost	member, endorsee		
2022	Sarahana Shrestha	Assembly	AD-103	Dem primary	7,907	51.8%	Won	member, endorsee	Mid-Hudson Valley DSA	
2022	Vanessa Agudelo	Assembly	AD-95	Dem primary	3,158	33.4%	Lost	endorsee		
2020	Jabari Brisport	Senate	SD-25	General	138,261	99.6%	Won	member, endorsee		
2020	Julia Salazar	Senate	SD-18	General	95,939	97.5%	Won	member, endorsee		
2020	Marcela Mitaynes	Assembly	AD-51	General	27,954	99.0%	Won	member, endorsee		
2020	Phara Souffrant Forrest	Assembly	AD-57	General	47,347	76.1%	Won	member, endorsee		
2020	Zohran Mamdani	Assembly	AD-36	General	38,221	98.5%	Won	member, endorsee		
2020	Boris Santos	Assembly	AD-54	Dem primary	N/A	N/A	Withdrew	member, endorsee	suspended campaign	
2020	Jabari Brisport	Senate	SD-25	Dem primary	33,510	57.7%	Won	member, endorsee		
2020	Julia Salazar	Senate	SD-18	Dem primary	29,435	86.8%	Won	member, endorsee		
2020	Marcela Mitaynes	Assembly	AD-51	Dem primary	3,607	34.9%	Won	member, endorsee		
2020	Phara Souffrant Forrest	Assembly	AD-57	Dem primary	15,711	55.4%	Won	member, endorsee		
2020	Zohran Mamdani	Assembly	AD-36	Dem primary	8,410	51.2%	Won	member, endorsee		
2018	Julia Salazar	Senate	SD-18	General	71,329	99.2%	Won	member, endorsee		
2018	Julia Salazar	Senate	SD-18	Dem primary	21,419	58.7%	Won	member, endorsee		

=== Local executive ===
Year	Candidate	Area	Office	District	Stage	Votes	%	Result	DSA	Note	Ref
2025	Zohran Mamdani	NYC	Mayor	At-Large	General	1,114,184	50.78%	Won	member, endorsee		
2025	Zohran Mamdani	NYC	Mayor	At-Large	Dem primary	573,169	56.39%	Won	member, endorsee		
2019	Tiffany Cabán	Queens County	District Attorney	At-Large	Dem primary	34,860	38.5%	Lost	endorsee		

=== Local legislature ===
Year	Candidate	Area	Office	District	Stage	Votes	%	Result	DSA	Note	Ref
2025	Alexa Avilés	NYC	City Council	38	General	20,848	73.5%	Won	member, endorsee		
2025	Tiffany Cabán	NYC	City Council	22	General	40,012	97.4%	Won	member, endorsee		
2021	Alexa Avilés	NYC	City Council	38	General	9,228	80.4%	Won	member, endorsee		
2021	Tiffany Cabán	NYC	City Council	22	General	12,885	63.4%	Won	member, endorsee		
2021	Adolfo Abreu	NYC	City Council	14	Dem primary	6,584	28.6%	Lost	member, endorsee		
2021	Alexa Avilés	NYC	City Council	38	Dem primary	6,857	65.1%	Won	member, endorsee		
2021	Brandon West	NYC	City Council	39	Dem primary	9,659	38.7%	Lost	member, endorsee		
2021	Jaslin Kaur	NYC	City Council	23	Dem primary	5,992	45.5%	Lost	endorsee		
2021	Michael Hollingsworth	NYC	City Council	35	Dem primary	9,390	34.0%	Lost	member, endorsee		
2021	Tiffany Cabán	NYC	City Council	22	Dem primary	9,088	62.6%	Won	member, endorsee		
2017	Jabari Brisport	NYC	City Council	35	General	7,221	29.2%	Lost	member, endorsee	ran on Green ballot line	
2017	Khader El-Yateem	NYC	City Council	43	Dem primary	7,236	31.4%	Lost	member, endorsee		

== See also ==
- Young Democratic Socialists of America
- Democratic Socialists of America chapters:
  - Chicago Democratic Socialists of America
  - Los Angeles Democratic Socialists of America
  - Metro DC Democratic Socialists of America
  - Seattle Democratic Socialists of America
  - Twin Cities Democratic Socialists of America
- DSA members:
  - List of Democratic Socialists of America public officeholders
  - Category:Members of the Democratic Socialists of America
- History of socialism in the United States:
  - Socialism in the United States
  - American Left
- History of socialism in New York:
  - United Labor Party (New York City)
  - Socialist Party of New York
  - American Labor Party
