= People's Republic of South Yorkshire =

Nickname for South Yorkshire under left-wing local governments

South Yorkshire following the 2017 general election. For the first time, every seat in the county was held by Labour (red) after this election. (Note: Jared O'Mara, who won Sheffield Hallam as the Labour candidate in 2017, was suspended from the party that same year.) This would be repeated at the 2024 general election.

"People's Republic of South Yorkshire" or "Socialist Republic of South Yorkshire" were nicknames often given to South Yorkshire under the left-wing local governments of the 1980s, especially the municipal socialist administration of Sheffield City Council led by David Blunkett, used by both detractors and supporters of the councils. The councils pursued a social policy radically different from that of Margaret Thatcher's national government, following more closely along the lines of Militant tendency-dominated Liverpool City Council and the Greater London Council led by Ken Livingstone.

The expression was coined by Max Williams, a leader writer at the Yorkshire Evening Post, although it was soon adopted by supporters of the council's left-wing policies. Sheffield Hallam was the only parliamentary constituency in South Yorkshire where the Conservative Party was a significant political force, the remaining seats being Labour safe seats or Liberal–Labour marginals. Sheffield City Council and the South Yorkshire Metropolitan Authority were solidly left-wing, remaining socialist even as Thatcherism became the dominant political ideology in the country at large.

Sheffield City Council constructed large council estates with large numbers of communal blocks of flats based on the streets in the sky philosophy, including the Park Hill complex, and the borough councils of South Yorkshire set up an extensive network of subsidised transport under the South Yorkshire Passenger Transport Executive. The councils also took more confrontational steps against the Conservative Westminster government. Sheffield refused to set a budget in the rate-capping rebellion, while South Yorkshire declared itself a nuclear-free zone and a demilitarized zone. The red flag flew on Sheffield Town Hall on May Day and the city signed a peace treaty with the city of Donetsk in Soviet Ukraine, at that point on the other side of the Iron Curtain. Both groups of policies – the practical and the symbolic – were sometimes cited as reasons for the nickname. The National Union of Mineworkers moved to headquarters in Sheffield in 1983 in the run-up to the decisive 1984–85 miners' strike, and the area subsequently became one of the main centres of the strike.

== Legacy ==
Although it lost some of its relevance following the Labour Party's shift towards New Labour and the expulsion of the left-wing elements of the party, along with the replacement of Thatcherism with the more superficially moderate Majorism and Blairism, the name remains in use for the area, which is still dominated by the political left. Up until and including the 2015 general election, the only seat in South Yorkshire not held by Labour was Sheffield Hallam, which was held at the time of the election by the-then Leader of the Liberal Democrats and Deputy Prime Minister of the United Kingdom, Nick Clegg. However, despite Labour not winning, the party did increase its vote by a net of 11,634 relative to 2010 and the Labour Party candidate Oliver Coppard significantly reduced then-Lib Dem leader Nick Clegg's majority from 15,284 votes to just 2,353 votes.

Labour, supported by the left-wing group Momentum, gained Sheffield Hallam at the 2017 snap general election for the first time ever, while also retaining all the South Yorkshire seats it previously represented, meaning that Labour represented every seat in South Yorkshire for the first time. The Labour candidate Jared O'Mara won a majority of 2,125 votes over Liberal Democrat Nick Clegg, and Clegg's loss was one of the major high-profile losses on the night of 8 June 2017. O'Mara was suspended from the Labour Party on 25 October 2017 after it emerged that he had made derogatory comments online about women and homosexuals, years prior to his election.

As of 2017, all four metropolitan borough councils (Barnsley, Doncaster, Rotherham and Sheffield) were under Labour control, and the Conservatives did not hold a single seat in Rotherham or Sheffield. However, in the 2019 general election, the Conservative Party won three seats in South Yorkshire for the first time: Don Valley, Rother Valley and Penistone & Stocksbridge. Labour had considerably reduced majorities in the remaining seats in Barnsley, Rotherham and Doncaster and in Sheffield South East and Sheffield Hallam, although their support remained strong in the other Sheffield constituencies.

At the 2021 local council elections, the Conservative Party gained one seat on Sheffield City Council (its first in over 15 years) and 20 seats on Rotherham Council. They also held the one seat they were defending in Barnsley and increased their representation on Doncaster Council by four seats. In the Police and Crime Commissioner election held the same day, the party increased its share of the vote by 21.5% compared with the 2016 by-election.

The Labour Party again won every seat in South Yorkshire at the 2024 election, at which they recorded a landslide victory nationally. In South Yorkshire, Labour regained the three seats which they had lost to the Conservatives in 2019; the party recorded generally comfortable victories in most seats in the county. However, the Green Party made considerable inroads in Sheffield, coming second in the Brightside & Hillsborough, Central and Heeley constituencies for the first time; while Reform UK performed well in both Barnsley seats.

At the 2025 local elections Reform UK took majority control of Doncaster Council from Labour gaining 37 of a total 55 seats while Labour narrowly held the mayoralty with a majority of just 698 votes, this was the first time since 1974 that a party other than Labour had a majority on the council. At the 2026 local elections, Reform took full control of Barnsley council gaining 42 out of 63 seats while Labour was reduced to just 11, similar to Doncaster the year prior this was the first time since the modern authority's inception in 1974 that Labour did not control the council. Meanwhile, in Sheffield the party also achieved a breakthrough result gaining 12 council seats out of a possible 30 up for election yet the council at large remains dominated by parties on the left including Labour, the Liberal Democrats and the Greens who hold 25, 22 and 20 seats respectively. These were only localised examples of the national phenomenon of the rise of the populist right in former Labour heartlands at the elections but nonetheless undermine the accuracy of the 'people's republic' nickname in the present day.

== General election results ==
1992 election results

2005 election results

2010 election results

2017 election results

2019 election results

2024 election results

== In popular culture ==
In March 2025, it was announced that the public transport network in South Yorkshire would be brought back under public ownership; the following year, the name of the planned new integrated transport network was announced as the South Yorkshire People's Network. Following this announcement, journalists noted the allusion to the People's Republic nickname in the new branding.

== See also ==
- Astoria, Queens - New York City neighbourhood nicknamed "The People's Republic of Astoria"
- Ceinture rouge
- Commie corridor
- List of city nicknames in the United Kingdom
- Little Moscow
- Red belt (Community of Madrid)
- Red Belt (Russia)
- Red Vienna
- Red wall (British politics)
