= Red belt =

Red belt may refer to:

- Red Belt (Pennsylvania), Allegheny County road belt system
- Red Belt (Pittsburgh), Allegheny County road belt system
- Red belt (martial arts)
  - Red belt (Brazilian Jiu-Jitsu)
- Red-Belted Clearwing, the European name of Synanthedon myopaeformis
- Redbelt, 2008 American film

== Left-leaning areas ==
- Red Belt (Russia), area dominated by the Communist Party of the Russian Federation
- Red belt (Italy), area dominated by the PSI, PCI, PDS and PD
- Red belt (Community of Madrid)
- Red belt (India), the area where Maoist insurgency operates
- Red belt (France), area around Paris dominated by the PCF
