= New York City Socialists in Office =

Political group

- Legislature(s): New York City Council
- Foundation: 2022
- Member parties: NYC-DSA
- National affiliation: Democratic Socialists of America
- Leader: Collective leadership
- Mayor of New York City: Zohran Mamdani
- Representation: 4 / 51
- Ideology: Democratic socialism
- Political position: Left-wing

The New York City Socialists in Office are a bloc within the New York City Council consisting of legislators who are members of, and endorsed by, the New York City Democratic Socialists of America. It is the City Council equivalent of the New York State Socialists in Office. They currently hold 4 seats, as well as the current mayor, Zohran Mamdani. Many members are also members of the New York City Council Progressive Caucus.

== Members ==
Office	Term	Photo	Name	First elected	Member since
Mayor	112th	Photo of Zohran Mamdani	Zohran Mamdani	2025	2025

District	Name	First elected	Member since
22nd	Tiffany Cabán	2021	2021
36th	Chi Ossé	2021	2026
38th	Alexa Avilés	2021	2021
39th	Shahana Hanif	2021	2026

== See also ==
- New York City Democratic Socialists of America
- New York State Socialists in Office
- New York City Council Progressive Caucus
- List of Democratic Socialists of America who have held office in the United States
