= Commie corridor =

American political demographic term

The "commie corridor" neighborhoods, highlighted in red, have supported left-wing politicians since 2018.

The results of first round of the democratic primaries for mayor in 2021 and 2025. Left wing candidates Maya Wiley and Zohran Mamdani's support (shown in yellow) is concentrated in the commie corridor.

The Commie corridor is a colloquial term for a set of New York City neighborhoods, stretching from western Queens into western Brooklyn, that have consistently backed leftist and socialist candidates at the municipal, state, and federal levels since the mid-2010s. The term was coined in 2025 after the upset victory of Zohran Mamdani in the 2025 New York City Democratic mayoral primary and the general election, in which these areas strongly supported him both times. The growing trend of left-wing politics in these neighborhoods has largely been attributed to rising costs of living, an influx of younger renters and immigrants with no attachment to the city's Democratic Party establishment, and sustained organizing by groups such as the Democratic Socialists of America (DSA).

Candidates associated with the corridor have generally run and won as Democrats, competing in Democratic primaries rather than as third-party challengers, with the DSA serving as the primary organizing force behind them. This region has been a core base of support for several socialists in the city, most notably representative Alexandria Ocasio-Cortez and mayor Zohran Mamdani, and it has been speculated that it will shift the city further left in the future.

== Origin ==
The term was popularized by political analyst Michael Lange, describing Mamdani's base of support in the 2025 New York City Democratic mayoral primary, on Substack calling it a "young and hungry leftist base, stretching from Astoria to Sunset Park". In that article, Lange describes the corridor as having been the base of support for Cynthia Nixon's 2018 primary challenge to then-governor Andrew Cuomo and Maya Wiley's 2021 run for mayor.

Although socialist politicians in New York exist outside of this corridor, such as Sarahana Shrestha of Poughkeepsie, most of New York's socialist state assemblymembers and state senators represent constituencies in the corridor.

== Neighborhoods in the commie corridor ==
The corridor's demographics are broadly gentrified, upper-middle class, young, ethnically white, Latino, South Asian and Asian, Muslim, college-educated renters.

Before the 2025 mayoral election, the consensus was that the corridor consisted of the core neighborhoods of Astoria, Long Island City, Sunnyside, Greenpoint, Williamsburg, East Williamsburg, Fort Greene, and Clinton Hill. But since that election, the corridor has been expanded to the neighborhoods of Ridgewood, Woodhaven, Bushwick, Cypress Hills, and Bedford-Stuyvesant, according to Lange.

== Political base ==
The Democratic Socialists of America have had a local chapter since the 1980s, but have had major influence in the corridor only since 2018. That year, Ocasio-Cortez and Julia Salazar defeated incumbents Joe Crowley and Martin Malave Dilan in the Democratic primaries for New York's 14th congressional district and New York's 18th State Senate district. Since then, various democratic socialists have been elected in the corridor with the DSA's support, including an additional state senator and seven state assembly members.

The Working Families Party has also supported left-wing progressives (though not necessarily socialists) in races across the state thanks to New York's fusion balloting laws, which allow a candidate to be supported by more than one party at once. While the WFP's footprint is less felt than the DSA in the corridor, it nevertheless supports progressives in Democratic primaries and in general elections. In 2026, DSA-endorsed Claire Valdez defeated WFP-endorsed Antonio Reynoso to become the Democratic nominee for New York's 7th congressional district.

== Notable politicians ==
- Tiffany Cabán, city councilor for New York City's 36th City Council district
- Zohran Mamdani, Mayor of New York City and former representative of New York's 36th State Assembly district
- Diana Moreno, representative of New York's 36th State Assembly district
- Alexandria Ocasio-Cortez, representative from New York's 14th congressional district
- Chi Ossé, city councillor for New York City's 22nd City Council district
- Julia Salazar, senator for New York's 18th State Senate district
- Claire Valdez, representative of New York's 37th State Assembly district, Democratic nominee for 7th congressional district
- Phara Souffrant Forrest, representative for New York’s 57th State Assembly district

== See also ==
- Blue wall (United States)
- Ceinture rouge
- List of Democratic Socialists of America public officeholders
- Left Coast
- Little Moscow
- People's Republic of South Yorkshire
- Red belt (Community of Madrid)
- Red Belt (Russia)
- Solid South
