= Brian Romero =

American politician

- Romero in 2026

Personal details
- Born: c. 1990 Queens, New York, U.S.
- Party: Democratic
- Other political affiliations: Working Families (Note: Romero has been elected on both the Democratic and Working Families ballot lines through New York's system of electoral fusion.); Democratic Socialists of America (Note: Democratic Socialists of America (DSA) is not a registered political party. Instead, it is a political organization for those with democratic socialist ideologies. Romero is a member of the New York City DSA chapter, but did not receive its endorsement.)
- Education: Borough of Manhattan Community College (AS); John Jay College of Criminal Justice (BA); Hunter College (MSW)

Brian Romero is an American politician who is the Democratic member-elect for the 34th district of the New York State Assembly in the 2026 New York State Assembly election. After winning the Democratic primary in June, and running unopposed in the November general election, he is currently the member-elect.

Romero is a member of the New York Working Families Party and Democratic Socialists of America, and formerly served as chief of staff to the current holder of that seat, Jessica González-Rojas. He was also chief of staff to Democratic Socialist in Office State Senator Kristen Gonzalez.

In June 2026, Romero defeated Rosa Sanchez to win the Democratic nomination for the position, garnering 67% of the vote. Romero ran with endorsements including Streets PAC, Congressmember Nydia Velázquez, and Run for Something. He had applied for the NYC-DSA's endorsement in that primary election but not received it. He then ran unopposed in the 2026 general election (on both the Democratic Party and Working Families Party lines), winning the seat. In the general election Romero had an endorsement from OPEIU Local 153.

Romero's parents were immigrants from Colombia. He grew up in East Elmhurst, experiencing housing insecurity and living for a period in NYCHA housing. He is a domestic violence survivor and worked as a social worker before entering politics and government.

== Political views ==
Romero supports the Not On Our Dime Act to regulate funding for New York state charities, and taxing the wealthy to fund better public services for working-class residents. He supports New York For All, a legislative bill to strengthen the state's sanctuary laws and protect immigrants. He does not support the proposed Metropolitan Park casino.

Romero and plans to work with the "Socialists in Office" bloc while in the Assembly, and possibly ask to join the SIO bloc.
