= New York State Socialists in Office =

Political group

- Legislature(s): New York State Legislature
- Member parties: NYC-DSA; Mid-Hudson Valley DSA; Buffalo DSA; Syracuse DSA
- National affiliation: Democratic Socialists of America
- Representation: 16 / 213 New York State Assembly 12 / 150 New York State Senate 4 / 63
- Ideology: Democratic socialism
- Political position: Left-wing
- Website: newyorksocialistsinoffice.com

The New York State Socialists in Office are a bloc within the New York State Legislature consisting of legislators who are members of, and endorsed by, the Democratic Socialists of America. They currently hold 16 seats across the New York State Assembly (12 seats) and New York State Senate (4 seats). 13 of the 16 are members of NYC-DSA, while Assemblymember Sarahana Shrestha (D-Esopus) is a member of Mid-Hudson Valley DSA, Assemblymember-elect Adam Bojak (D-Buffalo), is a member of Buffalo DSA, and Assemblymember-elect Maurice Brown (D-Syracuse), is a member of Syracuse DSA.

== Structure and operations ==
Members of the Socialists in Office bloc are expected to attend weekly committee meetings to strategize and coordinate together, on immediate concerns as well as long-term projects. The committee includes not only DSA-endorsed elected officials and their key staffers, but also nonelected members of DSA leadership, such as representatives of issue-specific working groups. Elected legislators who are members of DSA, but were not endorsed by DSA during their election campaigns, are allowed to apply for post-election admittance to the committee.

While serving in the New York State Assembly, Zohran Mamdani, then a member of the committee, credited it as the reason for several legislative accomplishments. He described the coordination and structure of the committee as helping members withstand pressure to betray their principles, calling it "the only answer" to "the coercion, the control, and the consequences that are meted out" in "legislative chambers that are built to corrupt the most well-intentioned, the most capable, and the most talented among us."

== Members ==
As of July 2026:

=== State Senate ===
District	Member	Chapter	First elected
12th	Aber Kawas	NYC-DSA	2026
18th	Julia Salazar	NYC-DSA	2018
25th	Jabari Brisport	NYC-DSA	2020
59th	Kristen Gonzalez	NYC-DSA	2022

=== State Assembly ===
District	Member	Chapter	First elected
36th	Diana Moreno	NYC-DSA	2026 (Note: Elected in a special election)
37th	Samantha Kattan	NYC-DSA	2026
38th	David Orkin	NYC-DSA	2026
50th	Emily Gallagher	NYC-DSA	2020
51st	Marcela Mitaynes	NYC-DSA	2020
54th	Christian Celeste Tate	NYC-DSA	2026
56th	Eon Huntley	NYC-DSA	2026
57th	Phara Souffrant Forrest	NYC-DSA	2020
65th	Illapa Sairitupac	NYC-DSA	2026
103rd	Sarahana Shrestha	Mid-Hudson; Valley DSA	2022
129th	Maurice Brown	Syracuse DSA	2026
149th	Adam Bojak	Buffalo DSA	2026

=== Past members ===
- Zohran Mamdani, mayor of New York City (2026–present) and former state assemblymember from the 36th district (2021–2025)
- Claire Valdez, U.S. representative-elect for New York's 7th congressional district and former state assemblymember from the 37th district (2024-2026)

== See also ==
- Young Democratic Socialists of America
- Democratic Socialists of America chapters:
  - Chicago Democratic Socialists of America
  - Los Angeles Democratic Socialists of America
  - Metro DC Democratic Socialists of America
  - New York City Democratic Socialists of America
  - Seattle Democratic Socialists of America
  - Twin Cities Democratic Socialists of America
- DSA members:
  - List of Democratic Socialists of America public officeholders
  - Category:Members of the Democratic Socialists of America
- History of socialism in the United States:
  - Socialism in the United States
  - American Left
- New York City Council Progressive Caucus
- Chicago City Council Socialist Caucus
