= National Union of Mineworkers headquarters =

Building in Sheffield, England

Coordinates: 53.38062°N 1.47312°W

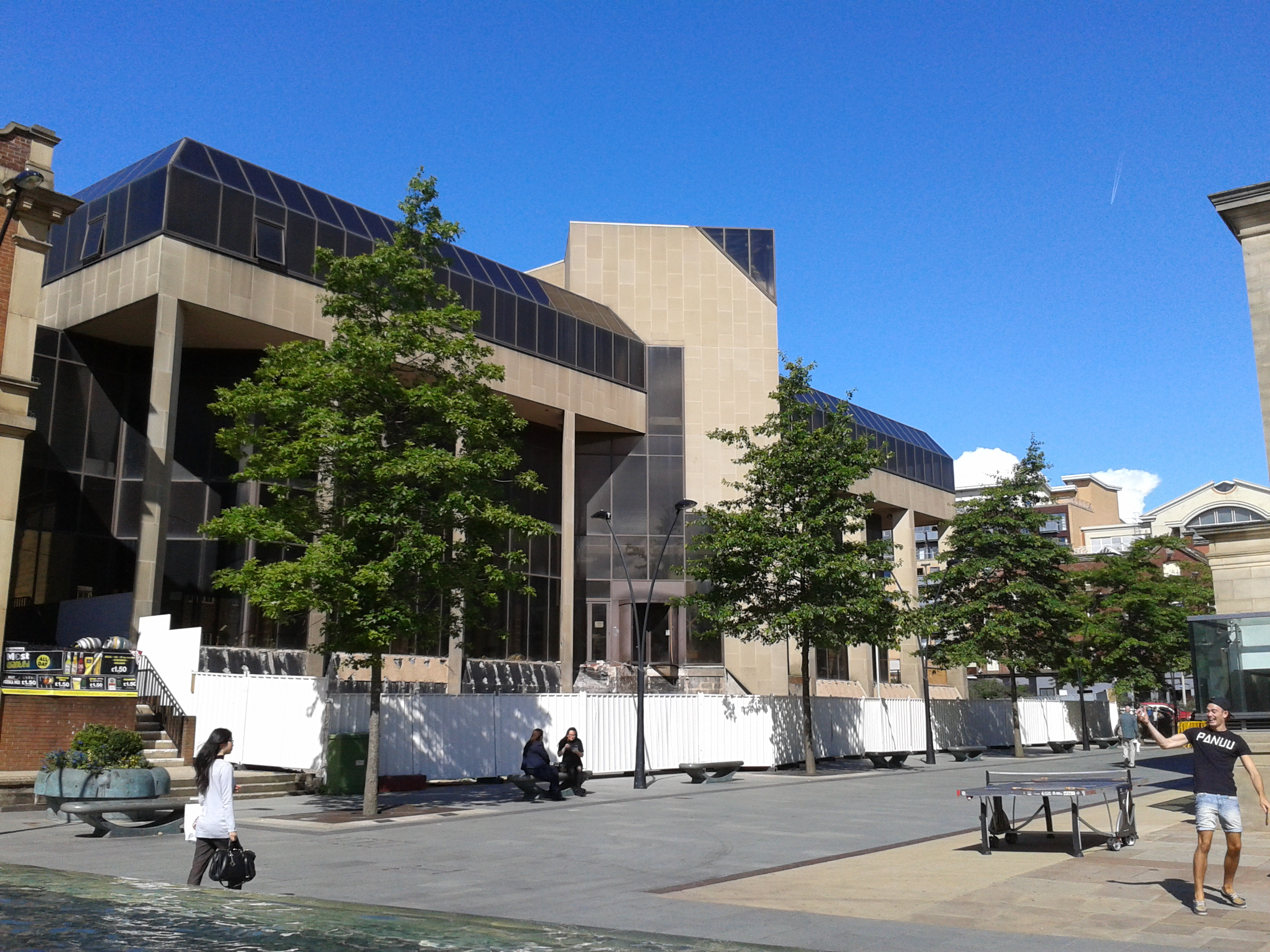
The building in 2013

The National Union of Mineworkers headquarters is a building in Sheffield, England which formerly housed the head office of the National Union of Mineworkers (NUM). Following a refurbishment in 2016, it now houses the regional headquarters of Grant Thornton, with bars and restaurants on the ground floor.

== History ==
The building was commissioned by Arthur Scargill in the early 1980s in an effort to move the NUM from London to the friendlier territory of the "Socialist Republic of South Yorkshire". Construction began in 1986 and the building opened in 1988. Following the decline of the mining industry the NUM again relocated its headquarters to Barnsley. The NUM occupied the building for less than four years. It then stood derelict for more than two decades and was threatened with demolition in 2006.

In December 2011, plans to turn the building into a casino were approved by Sheffield City Council. It was reported that as a casino, the building would include two restaurants and a rooftop bar. In January 2013 work began to open two restaurants on the ground floor, but developers Quest Property said the casino was on hold but "still an option". In January 2014 developers said the structure had been stripped out in preparation for use as restaurants, offices and for leisure purposes.

A £5 million refit, following which the building would become home to three restaurants on the ground floor and offices on the first and second floors, began in March 2016. The lease on the building was taken up by Quest Property, and the redevelopment funded in part by Sheffield City Council and the city's local enterprise partnership. A large marble frieze, made in Florence, Italy and depicting two miners, was left in place, due in part to its size and weight. In March 2016, both Pitcher and Piano and Turtle Bay were announced as occupiers of the restaurant units. In April 2016 the professional services network Grant Thornton International announced it would become the primary occupier of the building's office space from 2017.

== Architecture ==
The building was designed by Malcolm Lister and features a prominent central section inspired by the appearance of a mine's pit head. Architecturally, it is designed to blend in with Sheffield City Hall, which it sits opposite. In his 2010 book A Guide to the New Ruins of Great Britain, Owen Hatherley cites as ironic the fact that the NUM headquarters is more sympathetic to the history of Sheffield than anything constructed by New Labour, despite the latter's professed concern for "heritage".
