= Kevin Cahill (politician) =

American politician

Member of the New York State Assembly
- In office January 1, 1999 – December 31, 2022
- Preceded by: John J. Guerin
- Succeeded by: Sarahana Shrestha
- Constituency: 101st district (1999–2013); 103rd district (2013–2022)
- In office January 1, 1993 – December 31, 1994
- Preceded by: Maurice Hinchey
- Succeeded by: John J. Guerin
- Constituency: 101st district

Personal details
- Born: November 5, 1955 (age 70) New York City, U.S.
- Party: Democratic
- Children: 2
- Education: State University of New York at New Paltz (BA); Albany Law School (JD)
- Website: Official website

Kevin A. Cahill (born November 5, 1955) is an American politician who was a member of the New York State Assembly. Cahill is a Democrat and represented parts of Hudson Valley from 1993-1994, then again from 1999-2022. He currently serves as an appointed member of the New York Tax Appeals Tribunal.

Cahill graduated from the State University of New York at New Paltz in 1977 with a BA in political science, and from Albany Law School in 1980. From 1981 to 1990, Cahill worked as an attorney, while also serving on the Ulster County Democratic Committee. He was an Ulster County legislator from 1986 through 1992, when he served as minority leader of the Ulster County Legislature. From 1993 to 1994 he served as the Assemblyman from the 101st district.

After 1994, Cahill served as the director of a Medicare health care plan under contract with the Health Care Financing Administration. Cahill was elected again to the Assembly in 1998, and began his term in 1999.

He won each subsequent election for the Assembly until 2022, when he lost against Sarahana Shrestha in the Democratic Primary election on June 28, 2022 by less than 600 votes.

He was the chairman of the Standing Committee on Insurance. He previously served as chairman of the Standing Committee on Energy. He also serves on the Health, Higher Education, Ways and Means and Commerce and Industry Committees, among others. He served as the chairman of the Assembly Committee on Ethics and Guidance, co-chair of the Joint Legislative Ethics Commission, the Assembly Science and Technology Commission, Assembly spokesman for Community Corrections, part of the task force on Local Government Finance Reform and the chairman of the Legislative Task Force on People with Disabilities in the past. His term concluded in 2022.

Governor Kathy Hochul appointed Cahill to the New York Tax Appeals Tribunal in 2023.

== Personal life ==
Cahill has two adult children and lives in Kingston, New York.

New York State Assembly
Preceded by Maurice Hinchey	Member of the New York Assembly from the 101st district 1993–1995	Succeeded by John J. Guerin
Preceded by John J. Guerin	Member of the New York Assembly from the 101st district 1999–2013	Succeeded by Claudia Tenney
Preceded by Didi Barrett	Member of the New York Assembly from the 103rd district 2013–2022	Succeeded by Sarahana Shrestha
