= Adam Bojak =

American politician

Member-elect of the New York State Assembly from the 149th district
- Assuming office January 2027
- Succeeding: Jonathan Rivera
- Parliamentary group: New York State Socialists in Office

Personal details
- Party: Democratic
- Other political affiliations: Democratic Socialists of America (Note: The Democratic Socialists of America (DSA) are not a registered political party. Instead, they are a political organization for those with democratic socialist ideologies.)

Adam Bojak is an American politician. A member of the Democratic Party, he is the member-elect for the 149th district of the New York State Assembly.
