= Jonathan Rivera =

American politician (born 1986)

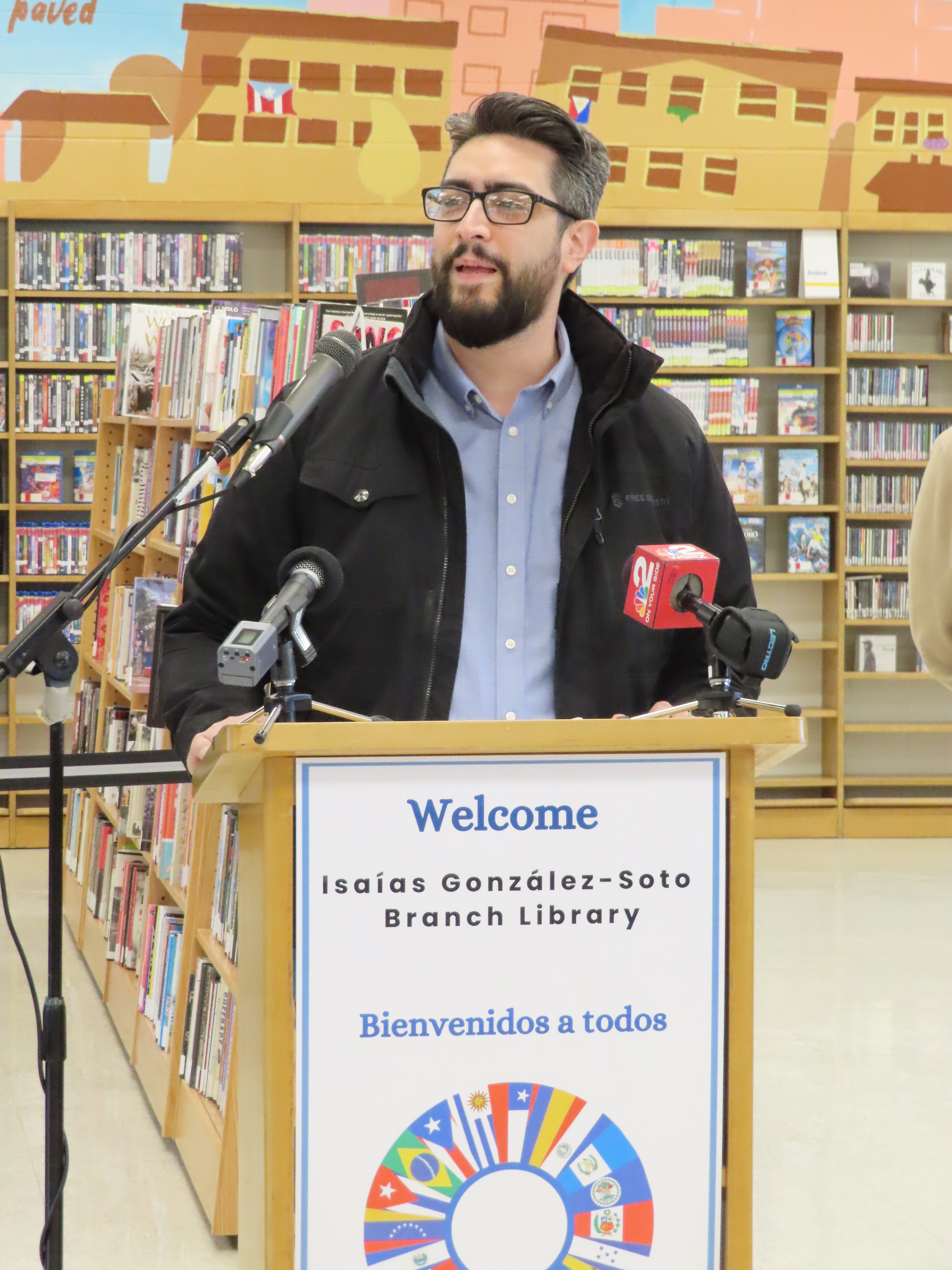

Member of the New York State Assembly from the 149th district
- Incumbent
- Assumed office January 1, 2021
- Preceded by: Sean Ryan
- Succeeded by: Adam Bojak (elect)

Personal details
- Born: July 19, 1986 (age 40) Buffalo, New York, U.S.
- Party: Democratic
- Parent: David A. Rivera (father)
- Education: Buffalo State College (BS); George Washington University (MS)
- Website: Official website

Jonathan D. Rivera (born July 19, 1986) is an American politician who is a member of the New York State Assembly for the 149th district. Elected in 2020, he assumed office on January 1, 2021.

== Early life and education ==
Rivera was born in Buffalo, New York. His father is Niagara District Common Councilman David A. Rivera. He earned a Bachelor of Science degree in business administration from Buffalo State College and working on a Master of Science in political management from George Washington University.

== Career ==
Prior to his campaign for New York State Assembly, Rivera worked as a special assistant to the Erie County Commissioner of Public Works. Rivera also worked as a liaison to the Erie County Legislature and was a field representative for Congressman Brian Higgins from 2005 to 2007.

=== New York State Assembly ===
In December 2019, Rivera declared his candidacy for the New York State Assembly's 149th District. He placed first in the Democratic primary, defeating attorney Adam Bojak, and former Niagara District Common Councilman Robert Quintana. Rivera defeated Republican nominee Joseph Totaro in the November general election.

Rivera was re-elected in 2022, defeating former school board member and Republican candidate Ralph R. Hernandez. Rivera was re-elected again in 2024, with no opponent.

In the Assembly, Rivera chaired the Commission on Administrative Regulations Review and the Subcommittee on Regional Tourism Development, and served as a member of ten others.

=== New York State Senate ===
In 2026, Rivera announced his candidacy for New York's 61st State Senate district, against the incumbent senator, Democrat Jeremy Zellner. Zellner won a special election to fill the seat on February 3, 2026, replacing the outgoing Sean Ryan, who had been elected mayor of Buffalo. Rivera endorsed his former primary opponent, attorney Adam Bojak, to replace him as 149th district Assemblyman.

On June 23, 2026, Rivera defeated incumbent Senator Jeremy Zellner 55-45, with 10,076 votes to Zellner's 8,270. Rivera faced no Republican opponent in the general election.

New York State Assembly
Preceded by Sean M. Ryan	New York State Assembly, 149th District; January 1, 2021 – present	Incumbent
