= Illapa Sairitupac =

Member-elect of the New York State Assembly from the 65th district
- Assuming office January 1, 2027
- Succeeding: Grace Lee

Personal details
- Born: 1986 or 1987 (age 39–40) Mount Kisco, New York, U.S.
- Party: Democratic
- Other political affiliations: Democratic Socialists of America (Note: The Democratic Socialists of America (DSA) are not a registered political party. Instead, they are a political organization for those with democratic socialist ideologies.)
- Education: New York University (MSW)
- Website: Campaign website

Illapa Sairitupac is an American politician and social worker. He is the Democratic member-elect for the 65th district of the New York State Assembly having won the 2026 election.

== Early life and education ==
Sairitupac was born in Mount Kisco, New York, and grew up in Westchester and Dutchess counties. His parents immigrated from Peru, with his mom's family from Apurímac and his father's family from Colcabamba. He earned his Master of Social Work from the New York University Silver School of Social Work in 2021. Sairitupac works as a housing organizer in Downtown Manhattan.

== Political career ==
Sairitupac first ran for office in the 2022 Democratic primary for the 65th district of the New York State Assembly, where he was defeated by incumbent representative Grace Lee. After Lee vacated the seat to run for the state Senate in 2026, Sairitupac entered the Democratic primary again, which he won with 34.5% of the vote. His 2026 primary campaign received endorsements from New York City Mayor Zohran Mamdani, US Senator Bernie Sanders, and New York City Democratic Socialists of America.

== Personal life ==
Sairitupac is openly gay and identifies as non-binary.
