= Little Moscow =

Communist enclave in a capitalist country

Little Moscow was a term for towns and villages in capitalist societies whose population appeared to hold extreme left-wing political values or communist views. The places so named were typically in working class areas, normally with strong trade union links to a heavy industry. In recent years, it has been used to represent Russian ethnic enclaves.

== History of use in Great Britain ==
The term first appeared within Great Britain between the two World Wars, and although referring to several places in Britain, three communities are primarily associated with the phrase: the Vale of Leven in Scotland, Chopwell in England and Maerdy in Wales. The term was initially used as an insult by newspapers, but it was quickly embraced and used as a term of pride by the labelled communities. In the case of the Vale of Leven, the area was reliant on the dyeing industry, and after high unemployment during the 1920s and 1930s the people of the area turned to radical socialist and communist views. This resulted in the Vale of Leven District Council becoming the first local council in Great Britain to see the Communists becoming the single largest group of representatives. Chopwell and Maerdy have a more similar history, with both areas once housing coal mining industries. Chopwell was first tagged as a 'Little Moscow' in the 1920s as a result of its strong support for the Communist Party, and still has streets in the village named after Communist Party leaders. Maerdy was also labelled on account of its socialist sympathies; the first recorded instance of its being named a 'Little Moscow' was recorded in the South Wales Daily News in 1930. The miners of Maerdy took great pride in the tag, producing several important Communist trade unionists including Arthur Horner, a founder member of the Communist Party of Great Britain.

=== Reasons for the popularity of communism in Great Britain ===
Social and economic conditions were very similar in all the towns labelled 'Little Moscow'. All these areas comprised a single industry community, in which one heavy industry employed the majority of the workers, and the local amenities were reliant upon the wages that industry supplied. This resulted in a close-knit community with strong social ties and responsibilities. During the early 20th century most of the areas were still expanding, and employment levels were high, but after World War I, despite an initial inflationary boom, the industries experienced market contractions and a series of strikes. These were followed by a protracted depression in the 1930s, which resulted in mass unemployment across all sectors of the coal, steel, textile and shipbuilding industries. A mixture of unemployment, the rise of trade unionism and the dissatisfaction brought about by World War I led to an increasing level of industrial unrest.

Many of the areas that would later be dubbed 'Little Moscows' had earlier in the century attempted to find another system other than the capitalist system favoured by the state. In 1912 the Rhondda saw the publication of The Miners' Next Step, a Syndicalist manifesto published by Noah Ablett. Ablett, a one-time checkweighman from the Mardy Colliery in Maerdy, was a founding member of the Plebs' League, a Marxist organisation originating from Ruskin College, Oxford. Syndicalism was quickly replaced by communist ideals.

In the 1920s, the old Liberal Party was being surpassed by Labour and the trade unions began the transition from supporting the Liberals to Labour. In many communities constituency Labour parties had not already been established, and thus through worker efforts both Labour and communist organisations came into being at the same time. This allowed militant workers to join the Communist Party without being isolated. These Communists were able to fashion alliances with the newly formed Labour Party, and eventually gained enough support to gain seats on local councils.

Another factor was the admiration held by many people from the areas for the Soviet Union. Friends of the Soviet Union had branches in many of the communities, and reciprocal visits of children and sports teams were arranged.

== History of use in mainland Europe ==
As within Britain, several settlements in mainland Europe have been dubbed "Little Moscow" during the 20th century. Similarly to Great Britain, these towns and villages often held Communist values or sympathies and often voted in local political officers of the Communist party despite being outside the Iron Curtain. In his 2011 paper Little Moscows in Western Europe: The Ecology of Small-Place Communism, Professor Ad Knotter of Maastricht University, identified ten such locations in mainland Western Europe that had been named as Little Moscow: Tarnac, Saint-Junien, Halluin, Sallaumines and Villerupt in France; Finsterwolde in the Netherlands and Mössingen, Selb, Frauenau and Penzberg in Germany. Knotter's research explored Western Europe alone, and that his work intentionally omitted research into settlements of similar characteristics in the Scandinavian north or Mediterranean south of the continent. In Germany, the village of Mörfelden in Hessen, traditionally home to many bricklayers, used to be nicknamed Little Moscow before World War Two for its support of the Communist Party, and still retains a somewhat strong presence of the otherwise very small German Communist Party.

== Usage outside Europe ==
A common usage of the term 'Little Moscow' outside Europe is to refer to a community that has a substantial ethnic enclave of Russian immigrants or people of Russian descent; similar to a 'Little Italy' or 'Chinatown'. Examples include Sunny Isles Beach, Florida, US which is sometimes known as 'Little Moscow', with over 7% of its population listing Russian as their first language in a 2000 survey.

Outside ethnic enclaves, the term is also used to show left-wing leanings of a community in other countries. In South America, the neighbourhood of Realengo in Rio de Janeiro, Brazil, was nicknamed 'Little Moscow' during the mid twentieth century because of the sometimes militant support of the residents towards the Partido Comunista Brasileiro, the Brazilian Communist Party. In Australia, the coal mining town of Collinsville in North Queensland was known as 'Little Moscow' for its left-wing political radicalism, based in a culture of militant trades unionism. The Salfit Governorate in the northern West Bank, Palestine, is known as a Little Moscow for the historical strength of the Palestinian Communist Party.

In the United States, as in Britain, the term has been used by the media to label a community with socialist or left-wing sympathies. In 1937, radio commentators used the term for Racine, Wisconsin, because of strikes and labour disputes. Though unlike in Britain, Racine did not have an open Communist political following, but through militant trade unions ran a series of strikes across industries throughout the city in the 1930s. This included one of the first areas to have an automobile union, which picketed before the likes of Flint, Detroit or Johnstown, and received negative media attention. Today this meaning has been absorbed by the term "Commie corridor".

== Bibliography ==
- Davies, John; Jenkins, Nigel (2008). The Welsh Academy Encyclopaedia of Wales. Cardiff: University of Wales Press. ISBN 978-0-7083-1953-6.
