= New York's 149th State Assembly district =

American legislative district

Assemblymember
Jonathan Rivera; D–Buffalo

New York's 149th State Assembly district is one of the 150 districts in the New York State Assembly. It has been represented by Jonathan Rivera since 2021. In 2026, he announced that he would not seek re-election.

== Geography ==
District 149 is in Erie County. It contains parts of the cities of Buffalo and Lackawanna, the town of Hamburg, including the villages of Blasdell and Hamburg, and the hamlet of Lake View.

The district overlaps New York's 23rd and 26th congressional districts, as well as the 60th, 61st and 63rd districts of the New York State Senate.

== Recent election results ==
=== 2026 ===
2026 New York State Assembly election, District 149
Primary election
Party	Candidate	Votes	%
Democratic	Adam Bojak	4,014	49.5
Democratic	Karen Hoak	2,700	33.3
Democratic	Kevin Deese	1,387	17.1
Write-in		10	0.1
Total votes		8,111	100.0
General election
Democratic	Adam Bojak		
Working Families	Adam Bojak		
Total	Adam Bojak		
Republican	Frank Bogulski		
Conservative	Frank Bogulski		
Total	Frank Bogulski		
Write-in			
Total votes			

=== 2024 ===
2024 New York State Assembly election, District 149
Party	Candidate	Votes	%
Democratic	Jonathan Rivera	30,507	
Working Families	Jonathan Rivera	7,584	
Total	Jonathan Rivera (incumbent)	38,091	98.8
Write-in		449	1.2
Total votes			100.0
Democratic hold			

=== 2022 ===
2022 New York State Assembly election, District 149
Party	Candidate	Votes	%
Democratic	Jonathan Rivera	20,651	
Working Families	Jonathan Rivera	3,141	
Total	Jonathan Rivera (incumbent)	23,792	59.1
Republican	Ralph Hernandez	12,983	
Conservative	Ralph Hernandez	3,453	
Total	Ralph Hernandez	16,436	40.8
Write-in		42	0.1
Total votes		40,270	100.0
Democratic hold			

=== 2020 ===
2020 New York State Assembly election, District 149
Primary election
Party	Candidate	Votes	%
Democratic	Jonathan Rivera	8,066	52.9
Democratic	Adam Bojak	4,638	30.4
Democratic	Robert Quintana	2,432	15.9
Write-in		118	0.8
Total votes		15,254	100.0
General election
Democratic	Jonathan Rivera	33,144	
Working Families	Jonathan Rivera	4,400	
Independence	Jonathan Rivera	1,067	
Total	Jonathan Rivera	38,611	65.8
Republican	Joseph Totaro	19,922	34.0
Write-in		111	0.2
Total votes		58,644	100.0
Democratic hold			

=== 2018 ===
2018 New York State Assembly election, District 149
Party	Candidate	Votes	%
Democratic	Sean Ryan	27,724	
Working Families	Sean Ryan	1,782	
Independence	Sean Ryan	1,056	
Women's Equality	Sean Ryan	671	
Total	Sean Ryan (incumbent)	31,233	72.1
Republican	Joseph Totaro	12,062	27.9
Write-in		0	0.0
Total votes		43,295	100.0
Democratic hold			

=== 2016 ===
2016 New York State Assembly election, District 149
Party	Candidate	Votes	%
Democratic	Sean Ryan	32,819	
Working Families	Sean Ryan	3,738	
Independence	Sean Ryan	3,114	
Women's Equality	Sean Ryan	854	
Total	Sean Ryan (incumbent)	40,525	100.0
Write-in		0	0.0
Total votes		40,525	100.0
Democratic hold			

=== 2014 ===
2014 New York State Assembly election, District 149
Primary election
Party	Candidate	Votes	%
Green	Charley Tarr	3	100.0
Write-in		0	0.0
Total votes		3	100
General election
Democratic	Sean Ryan	15,067	
Working Families	Sean Ryan	2,281	
Independence	Sean Ryan	1,895	
Total	Sean Ryan (incumbent)	19,243	68.0
Republican	Jacob Bratek	8,216	29.0
Green	Charley Tarr	852	3.0
Write-in		0	0.0
Total votes		28,311	100.0
Democratic hold			

=== 2012 ===
2012 New York State Assembly election, District 146
Primary election
Party	Candidate	Votes	%
Democratic	Sean Ryan (incumbent)	5,135	64.4
Democratic	Kevin Gaughan	2,274	28.5
Democratic	Joseph Mascia	563	7.1
Write-in		0	0.0
Total votes		7,972	100.0
General election
Democratic	Sean Ryan	31,605	
Working Families	Sean Ryan	4,250	
Total	Sean Ryan (incumbent)	35,855	82.8
Conservative	Joseph Mascia	7,431	17.2
Write-in		0	0.0
Total votes		43,286	100.0
Democratic hold			
