= Sarahana Shrestha =

American politician

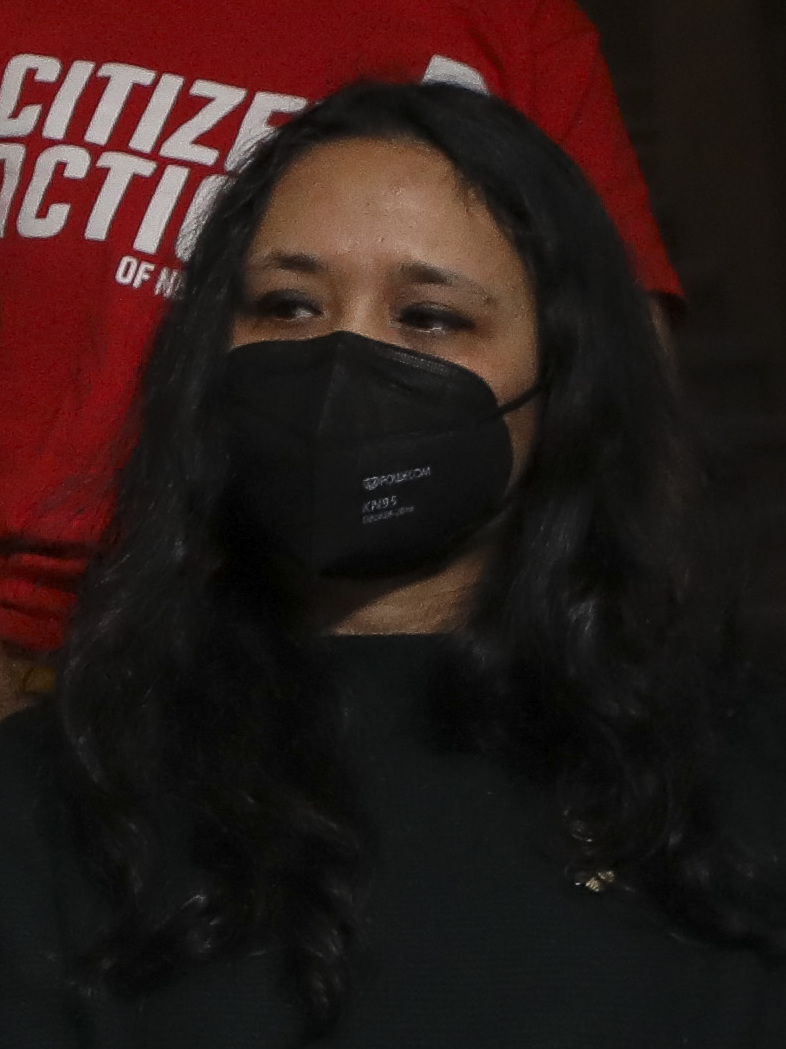
- Shrestha in 2023

Member of the New York State Assembly from the 103rd district
- Incumbent
- Assumed office January 1, 2023
- Preceded by: Kevin Cahill

Personal details
- Born: Sarahana Shrestha; 1980 or 1981 (age 45–46) Kathmandu, Nepal
- Party: Democratic
- Other political affiliations: Democratic Socialists of America; Working Families Party
- Education: New York Institute of Technology (BS)
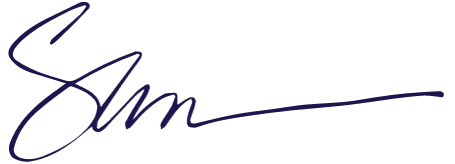
- Signature

Sarahana Shrestha is a Nepalese-American democratic socialist politician and activist. She is a member of the New York State Assembly, representing the New York's 103rd State Assembly district in the mid-Hudson Valley. She was first elected in November 2022.

== Early life and education ==
Shrestha was born in Kathmandu, Nepal, and moved to the United States in 2001 to study computer science at the New York Institute of Technology. She became interested in socialist politics and the anti-war movement as a college student. She became an American citizen in 2019.

== Career ==
Shrestha is affiliated with Public Power NY, a coalition of clean energy advocacy organizations. She has also worked as a graphic designer and is the co-chair of the Democratic Socialists of America's Ulster County chapter. Shrestha focused her campaign on climate and renewable energy policy.

In 2021, she and her husband worked on Phil Erner's campaign for the Ulster County legislature.

=== New York State Assembly ===
==== Elections ====
In 2022, Shrestha announced she would run against incumbent state assemblymember Kevin Cahill in the 103rd district. She was endorsed by the Democratic Socialists of America, Working Families Party, and U.S. representative Alexandria Ocasio-Cortez. Shrestha was elected in November 2022 and assumed office on January 1, 2023, becoming member of the Socialists in Office bloc.

In 2024, she was challenged by Gabi Madden, a former staffer of state senator James Skoufis who was endorsed by him and Kingston mayor Steve Noble. She handily defeated Madden in the Democratic primary election.

==== Tenure ====
Shrestha advocated for good cause eviction protections in 2024. Shrestha advocates for turning the Central Hudson Gas & Electric Corp. into the Hudson Valley Power Authority, a public utility company. She co-sponsored a bill to establish a single-payer healthcare system in New York in April 2026.

She is a member of the New York State Socialists in Office.

== Electoral history ==
2022 New York State Assembly election, 103rd district
Primary election
Party	Candidate	Votes	%
Democratic	Sarahana Shrestha	7,907	51.8
Democratic	Kevin Cahill (incumbent)	7,369	48.2
Write-in		6	0.0
Total votes		15,282	100.0
General election
Democratic	Sarahana Shrestha	30,703	
Working Families	Sarahana Shrestha	5,902	
Total	Sarahana Shrestha	36,605	60.7
Republican	Patrick Sheehan	19,908	
Conservative	Patrick Sheehan	3,646	
Total	Patrick Sheehan	23,554	39.1
Write-in		115	0.2
Total votes		60,274	100.0
Democratic hold			

2024 New York State Assembly election, District 103
Primary election
Party	Candidate	Votes	%
Democratic	Sarahana Shrestha (incumbent)	9,219	66.2
Democratic	Gabi Madden	4,688	33.7
Write-in		11	0.1
Total votes		13,918	100.0
General election
Democratic	Sarahana Shrestha	39,722	
Working Families	Sarahana Shrestha	7,271	
Total	Sarahana Shrestha (incumbent)	46,993	64.1
Republican	Jack Hayes	22,203	
Conservative	Jack Hayes	3,973	
Total	Jack Hayes	26,176	35.7
Write-in		107	0.2
Total votes		73,276	100.0
Democratic hold			
