= New York's 103rd State Assembly district =

American legislative district

Assemblymember
Sarahana Shrestha; D–Esopus

New York's 103rd State Assembly district is one of the 150 districts in the New York State Assembly. It has been represented by Sarahana Shrestha since 2023, defeating then-incumbent Kevin Cahill.

== Geography ==
District 103 encompasses parts of Ulster and Dutchess counties. The city of Kingston, and the towns of Esopus, Gardiner, New Paltz and Rhinebeck are included in this district.

The district overlaps (partially) with New York's 18th and 19th congressional districts, as well as the 41st and 51st districts of the New York State Senate.

=== 2010s ===
District 103 contains a majority of Ulster County and a portion of Dutchess County. The city of Kingston, and the towns of Esopus, Gardiner, New Paltz, Plattekill, Rhinebeck and Shandaken are included in this district.

== Recent election results ==
=== 2026 ===
2026 New York State Assembly election, District 103
Party	Candidate	Votes	%
Democratic	Sarahana Shrestha		
Working Families	Sarahana Shrestha		
Total	Sarahana Shrestha (incumbent)		
Republican	Santos Lopez		
Conservative	Santos Lopez		
Total	Santos Lopez		
Write-in			
Total votes			

=== 2024 ===
2024 New York State Assembly election, District 103
Primary election
Party	Candidate	Votes	%
Democratic	Sarahana Shrestha (incumbent)	9,219	66.2
Democratic	Gabi Madden	4,688	33.7
Write-in		11	0.1
Total votes		13,918	100.0
General election
Democratic	Sarahana Shrestha	39,722	
Working Families	Sarahana Shrestha	7,271	
Total	Sarahana Shrestha (incumbent)	46,993	64.1
Republican	Jack Hayes	22,203	
Conservative	Jack Hayes	3,973	
Total	Jack Hayes	26,176	35.7
Write-in		107	0.2
Total votes		73,276	100.0
Democratic hold			

=== 2022 ===
2022 New York State Assembly election, District 103
Primary election
Party	Candidate	Votes	%
Democratic	Sarahana Shrestha	7,907	51.8
Democratic	Kevin Cahill (incumbent)	7,369	48.2
Write-in		6	0.0
Total votes		15,282	100.0
General election
Democratic	Sarahana Shrestha	30,703	
Working Families	Sarahana Shrestha	5,902	
Total	Sarahana Shrestha	36,605	60.7
Republican	Patrick Sheehan	19,908	
Conservative	Patrick Sheehan	3,646	
Total	Patrick Sheehan	23,554	39.1
Write-in		115	0.2
Total votes		60,274	100.0
Democratic hold			

=== 2020 ===
2020 New York State Assembly election, District 103
Party	Candidate	Votes	%
Democratic	Kevin Cahill	41,898	
Working Families	Kevin Cahill	8,217	
Independence	Kevin Cahill	1,029	
Total	Kevin Cahill (incumbent)	51,234	69.9
Republican	Rex Bridges	19,636	
Conservative	Rex Bridges	2,404	
Total	Rex Bridges	22,040	30.1
Write-in		62	0.0
Total votes		73,336	100.0
Democratic hold			

=== 2018 ===
2018 New York State Assembly election, District 103
Party	Candidate	Votes	%
Democratic	Kevin Cahill	39,711	
Working Families	Kevin Cahill	6,468	
Total	Kevin Cahill (incumbent)	46,179	99.5
Write-in		219	0.5
Total votes		46,398	100.0
Democratic hold			

=== 2016 ===
2016 New York State Assembly election, District 103
Party	Candidate	Votes	%
Democratic	Kevin Cahill	37,380	
Working Families	Kevin Cahill	6,376	
Total	Kevin Cahill (incumbent)	43,756	77.8
Conservative	Jack Hayes	12,416	22.1
Write-in		37	0.1
Total votes		56,209	100.0
Democratic hold			

=== 2014 ===
2014 New York State Assembly election, District 103
Party	Candidate	Votes	%
Democratic	Kevin Cahill	20,423	
Working Families	Kevin Cahill	5,114	
Total	Kevin Cahill (incumbent)	25,537	61.3
Republican	Kevin Roberts	12,556	
Conservative	Kevin Roberts	3,496	
Total	Kevin Roberts	16,052	38.5
Write-in		64	0.2
Total votes		41,653	100.0
Democratic hold			

=== 2012 ===
2012 New York State Assembly election, District 103
Party	Candidate	Votes	%
Democratic	Kevin Cahill	37,757	
Working Families	Kevin Cahill	5,406	
Independence	Kevin Cahill	4,189	
Total	Kevin Cahill	47,352	99.2
Write-in		375	0.8
Total votes		47,727	100.0
Democratic hold			
