= Red belt (Community of Madrid) =

Population around Madrid, Spain

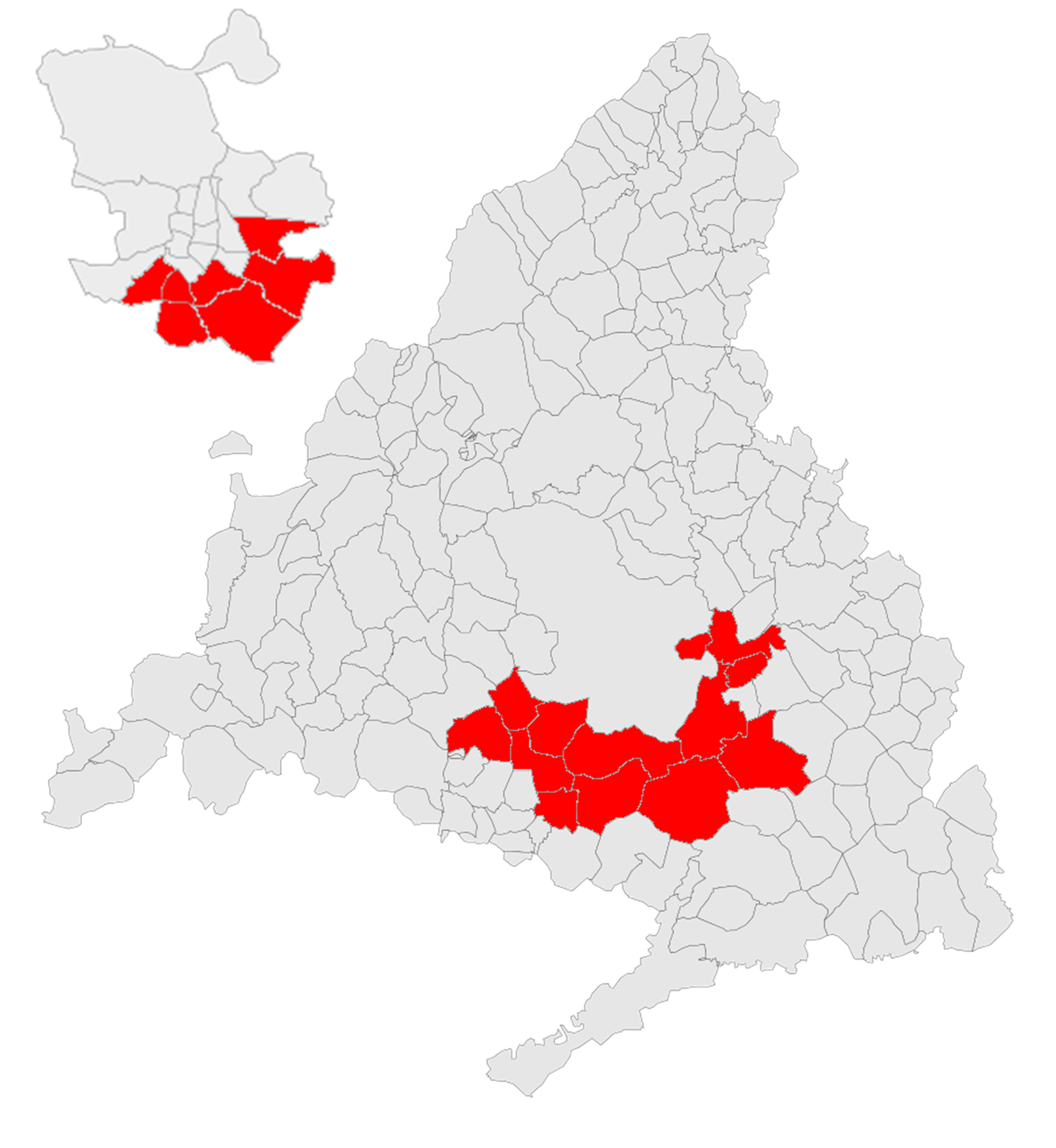
Location of the "red belt" within the Community and the city of Madrid.

The expression red belt (Spanish: Cinturón rojo) is used to designate in the Community of Madrid, since the return to democracy in the last decades of the 20th century, the set of cities located in the southern part of the metropolitan area of the city of Madrid, characterized by their high population of workers or the working class and because of their long history with mayors of the Spanish Socialist Workers' Party or other left parties and coalitions such as the Communist Party of Spain or the United Left. The municipalities represent a total of 21% of the population residing in the Community of Madrid, with six out of the ten most populated municipalities of the region belonging to the red belt. The name is also used to talk about the southern districts of the city of Madrid.

As of the 2010s, there was also talk in the region of a "purple belt" in reference to the emergence, with a notable implantation in the red belt, of the new Podemos party, whose color is purple instead of the traditional red of the left-wing parties.

== Municipalities of the Madrilenian "red belt" ==
Municipality	Population (2024)	Current mayor	Term start	Party (2023-2027)	Parties in local government since 1979	Notes
Alcorcón	174 740 (7th)	Candelaria Testa	2023	PSOE (Coalition)	1979-1999; 2003-2011; 2019-current	
Arganda del Rey	59 209 (21st)	Alberto Escribano	2023	PP (Coalition)	1979-1999; 1999-2003; 2015-2023	
Coslada	80 688 (16th)	Ángel Viveros	2015	PSOE (Coalition)	1982-1983 1983-1999; 1999-2003; 2007-2011; 2015-current	
Fuenlabrada	190 496 (6th)	Javier Ayala	2018	PSOE (Majority)	1979-current	Never has had a conservative mayor.
Getafe	191 560 (5th)	Sara Hernández	2015	PSOE (Coalition)	1979-2011; 2015-current	
Leganés	193 934 (4th)	Miguel Ángel Recuenco	2023	PP (Coalition)	1979-2007; 2007-2011; 2015-2023	
Mejorada del Campo	24 632 (33rd)	Jorge Capa	2015	PSOE (Majority)	1978-1982; 1982-1995; 1995-1999; 1999-2011; 2015-current	
Móstoles	213 268 (2nd)	Manuel Bautista	2023	PP (Coalition)	1979-2003; 2015-2023	
Parla	134 876 (9th)	Ramón Jurado	2019	PSOE (Coalition)	1979-2015; 2019-current	
Pinto	55 989 (23rd)	Salomón Aguado	2023	PP (Coalition)	1979-1987; 1987-1995; 1995-2007; 2008-2011; 2015-2019; 2019-2023	
Rivas-Vaciamadrid	101 637 (11th)	Aída Castillejo	2022	IU (Coalition)	1987-1991; 1991-current	Never has had a conservative mayor.
San Fernando de Henares	38 969 (25th)	Francisco Javier Corpa	2019	PSOE (Majority)	1979-1991; 1991-1995; 1995-2015; 2015-2019; 2019-current	Never has had a conservative mayor.
San Martín de la Vega	20 664 (36th)	Rafael Martínez	2015	PSOE (Majority)	1979-2007; 2015-current	
Velilla de San Antonio	14 008 (47th)	Antonia Alcázar	2015	PSOE (Coalition)	1987-2009; 2015-current	
