= Democratic Socialists of America =

US political organization

- Abbreviation: DSA
- Governing body: National Political Committee
- Co-chairs: Megan Romer; Ashik Siddique
- Founder: Michael Harrington
- Founded: March 20, 1982; 44 years ago
- Merger of: Democratic Socialist Organizing Committee; New American Movement
- Headquarters: New York City
- Newspaper: Democratic Left; Socialist Forum
- Youth wing: Young Democratic Socialists of America
- Membership: ▲130,000+ (2026)
- Ideology: Democratic socialism; Socialism (multi-tendency)
- Political position: Left-wing to far-left
- Regional affiliation: São Paulo Forum (associate, since 2023)
- International affiliation: Progressive International (since 2023); Socialist International (1982–2017)
- Colors: Red

Website
- dsausa.org

The Democratic Socialists of America (DSA) is a socialist political organization in the United States and the largest left-wing organization in US history. A big tent party on the left wing of the American political spectrum, it is primarily organized around the principles of democratic socialism, with its members active in electoral politics, labor organizing, and direct action campaigns.

DSA was founded in 1982 from a merger of the Democratic Socialist Organizing Committee (DSOC) and the New American Movement (NAM). The merger was seen as a symbolic healing of the rift between the Old Left, represented by DSOC's social democrats and trade unionists, and the New Left, represented by NAM's activists who emerged from the social movements of the 1960s. Initially led by Michael Harrington, the DSA continued DSOC's strategy of "realignment" by working within the Democratic Party to push it to the left, functioning as a small advocacy group for its first three decades. Energized by the 2016 and 2020 presidential campaigns of Senator Bernie Sanders, a self-identified democratic socialist, and the elections of Donald Trump, the DSA's membership swelled from about 6,000 members in 2015 to more than 130,000 in 2026. This growth gave the organization a much younger and more activist base, and shifted its strategy toward building an independent political force, though this remains a subject of internal debate.

DSA's platform centers on expanding public ownership and labor rights through measures like Medicare for All, a 32-hour work week, and a Green New Deal, while advocating for radical democratic reforms including the abolition of the U.S. Senate and the restructuring of the presidency. The organization's foreign policy is anti-imperialist, strongly supporting spending cuts and footprint reductions to the US military while also supporting pro-Palestinian and anti-Zionist causes. It has a decentralized structure in which local chapters and ideological caucuses have significant autonomy. The organization's largest chapters include those in New York City (where it is headquartered), Los Angeles, and the Washington metropolitan area.

DSA does not maintain its own ballot line. The organization engages in electoral politics by endorsing and canvassing for candidates who align with its values, including Democrats, Working Families, Greens, and independents. Notable DSA-affiliated elected officials include US representatives Alexandria Ocasio-Cortez and Rashida Tlaib (both elected in 2018), New York City mayor Zohran Mamdani (elected in 2025), and mayors-elect Nithya Raman of Los Angeles and Janeese Lewis George of Washington, D.C. (both elected in 2026). In 2025, over 250 DSA members held elected public office across 40 states, with 90% elected after 2019.

== History ==
=== Origins and founding (1973–1982) ===
The Democratic Socialists of America was formed in 1982 through the merger of two left-wing organizations: the Democratic Socialist Organizing Committee (DSOC) and the New American Movement (NAM).

Michael Harrington was the first chairman of DSA and its most prominent public figure until his death in 1989.

DSOC was founded in 1973 by the socialist intellectual Michael Harrington. Harrington had become a prominent national figure after his book The Other America (1962) helped inspire the War on Poverty, and he was a leader of a faction within the Socialist Party of America. He served as national chairman (later co-chairman) of the Socialist Party from 1968 until he resigned in 1972 in protest against the party's rightward drift and its stance on the Vietnam War.

Growing from a few hundred members to nearly 5,000 in less than a decade, DSOC was a union of Old Left social democrats, trade union leaders, and progressive youth dedicated to working as a left-wing pressure group within the Democratic Party. Harrington envisioned the DSOC as the "left wing of the possible", and its main strategy was "realignment", the idea that socialists could work with labor unions and social movements to push the Democratic Party to the left, drive out its conservative Southern wing, and transform it into a social democratic party. A key project for this strategy was the Democratic Agenda, a DSOC-inspired coalition of labor and liberal activists that challenged the centrist policies of the Jimmy Carter administration from within the party during the late 1970s.

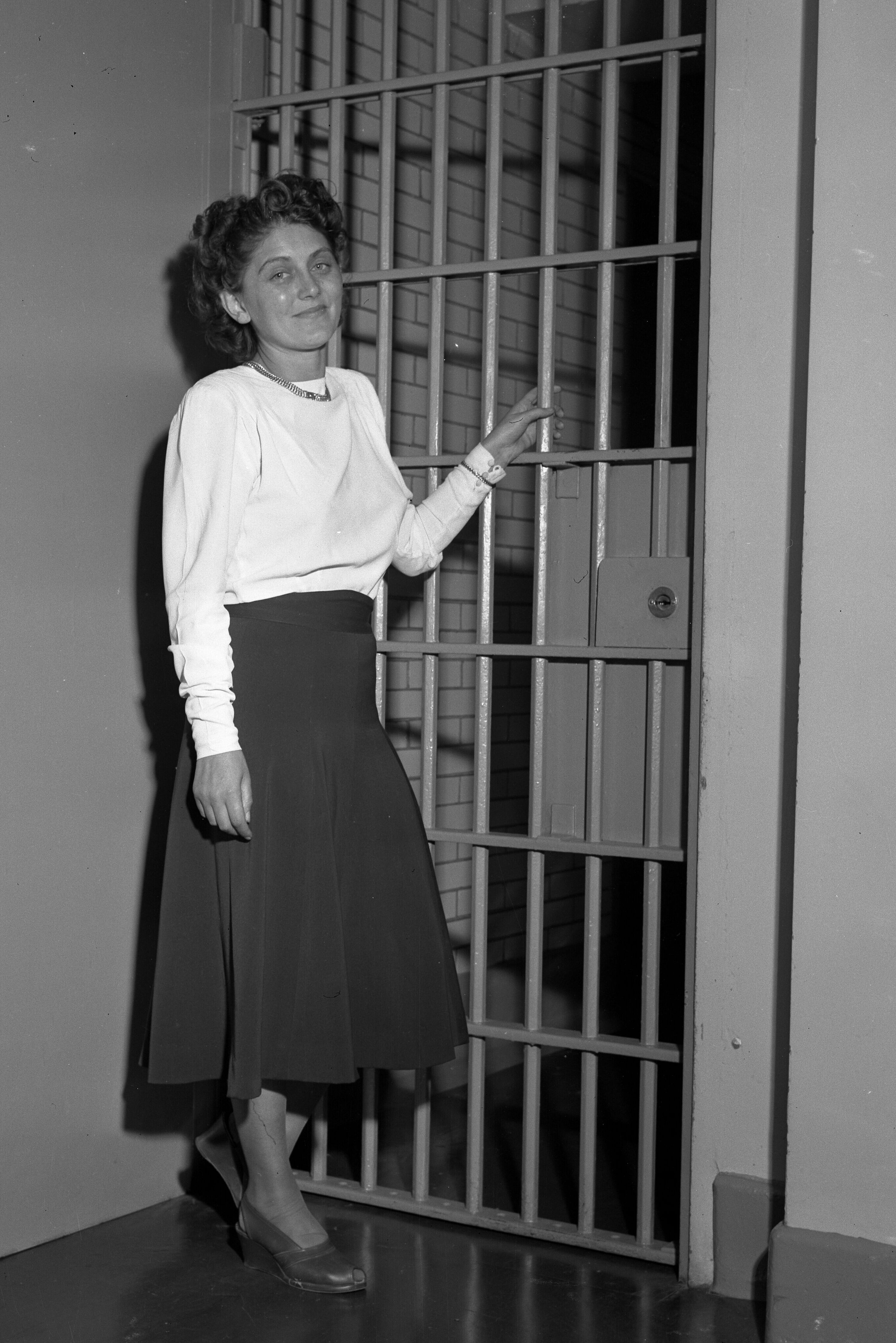
Dorothy Ray Healey, a prominent member of the New American Movement

The New American Movement (NAM) was founded in 1971 by Michael Lerner and other former members of Students for a Democratic Society (SDS), the main campus-based organization of the New Left. Emerging from SDS and the socialist-feminist women's unions of the period, NAM was led by New Left veterans who sought to recover the early SDS's humanistic, revolutionary spirit while rejecting the Maoism and vanguardism that had led to its implosion.

In 1974, the organization was bolstered by the entry of Dorothy Ray Healey, a longtime leader of the Communist Party who had broken with the party over its lack of internal democracy and its support for the Soviet invasion of Czechoslovakia. NAM developed a socialist feminist and Eurocommunist orientation, emphasizing Gramscian Marxism and building a grassroots presence through local struggles around affordable housing, utility rates, and reproductive rights.

By the early 1980s, both organizations saw a need for unity. DSOC had influential union allies and a foothold in mainstream politics, but few young activists. NAM had a more youthful activist base but lacked DSOC's political influence. In March 1981, DSOC voted unanimously to authorize merger negotiations with NAM. The merger convention, held in Detroit on March 20–21, 1982, created DSA with a combined membership of 6,000. It was a deliberate effort to heal the rift between the Old Left and the New Left. Harrington took the lead of the new organization, which adopted DSOC's strategy of realignment while incorporating NAM's commitment to socialist feminism and grassroots organizing.

=== The Harrington era (1982–1989) ===
In the 1980s, DSA functioned as a home for a diverse group of activists, including democratic Marxists, Fabians, religious socialists, former Communists, and labor Zionists. All were united by opposition to Reaganism. DSA continued the DSOC strategy of working within the Democratic Party to support progressive candidates and policies. It did not endorse Jesse Jackson's 1984 presidential campaign but was part of the Rainbow Coalition that supported his 1988 campaign. A central ambition for Harrington was to build a "conscience constituency" of educated professionals who, he argued, were predisposed to social planning and could become allies of the poor and the labor movement in a new progressive coalition.

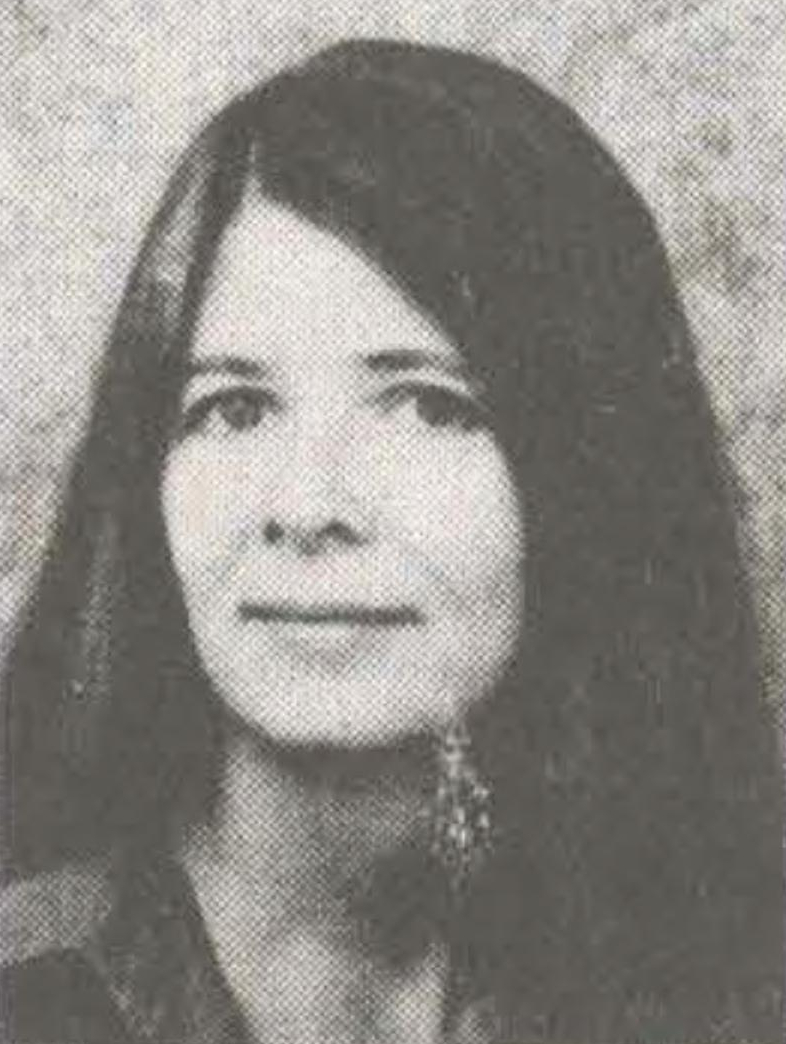
Barbara Ehrenreich, a socialist feminist and co-chair of DSA from 1983

DSA's membership and influence during this era extended across academia, the labor movement, and politics. Its intellectual wing included Irving Howe, Michael Walzer, Frances Fox Piven, Richard Rorty, and Iris Marion Young. Cornel West became an honorary chair of DSA and developed his "prophetic pragmatism" in dialogue with the organization's multi-tendency traditions.

At the 1983 convention, after DSA passed a resolution calling for male and female co-chairs, Barbara Ehrenreich became co-chair with Harrington. The organization also had influential allies in the labor movement, including AFSCME presidents Jerry Wurf and Victor Gotbaum, UAW president Douglas Fraser, and Machinists president William Winpisinger. Its political reach extended to elected officials like Congressmen John Conyers, Bella Abzug, Ron Dellums, and Robert Kastenmeier; New York mayor David Dinkins; and feminist icon Gloria Steinem.

DSA played a significant role in Central American solidarity activism, opposing the Reagan administration's policies in El Salvador and Nicaragua in solidarity with the Sandinistas and leftist rebels. DSA was also particularly active in the anti-apartheid movement, linking struggles for social justice abroad to those at home. Despite these efforts, DSA's membership remained small, growing to 8,000 by 1983 but never surpassing that number during Harrington's lifetime. Harrington's final book, Socialism: Past & Future (1989), written as he was dying of cancer, served as a "letter to the next left", urging it to adapt socialist values to the newly globalized, post-industrial world.

=== Stagnation and opposition (1990–2015) ===
DSA convention banner reading "Obama Is No Socialist, But We Are", 2009

After Harrington's death in 1989, DSA struggled for relevance in the 1990s and early 2000s, a period during which Gary Dorrien has said the organization struggled "merely to hang on". With the collapse of Communism in 1989 and the rise of Third Way neoliberalism under President Bill Clinton, the political space for democratic socialism seemed to vanish. In many parts of the country, DSA chapters functioned primarily as study groups for "scattered, stubborn types holding out against the 1990s", with the youth wing, the Young Democratic Socialists (YDS), largely responsible for keeping the organization afloat. Direct-mail campaigns in the early to mid-1990s boosted paper membership to 10,000.

Despite its small size, DSA maintained a principled opposition to the Democratic Party's neoliberal turn. In 1995, DSA updated its foundational document, "Where We Stand", placing economic globalization and the power of multinational corporations at the center of its analysis. It called for a humane social order based on democratic planning and market mechanisms and for "economic democracy... from below, through a democratic transformation of the institutions of civil society."

The DSA also initiated key campaigns during this period. In the early 1990s, it made the fight for a single-payer healthcare system a major national priority, sponsoring a multi-city tour by Canadian health advocates to promote the model. It actively campaigned against President Clinton's signature policies, including the North American Free Trade Agreement (NAFTA), the 1994 crime bill, and the gutting of welfare in the Personal Responsibility and Work Opportunity Act of 1996. It also founded the Prison Moratorium Project in 1997 to oppose mass incarceration. In 1999, DSA activists participated in the anti-globalization protests surrounding that year's World Trade Organization conference in Seattle.

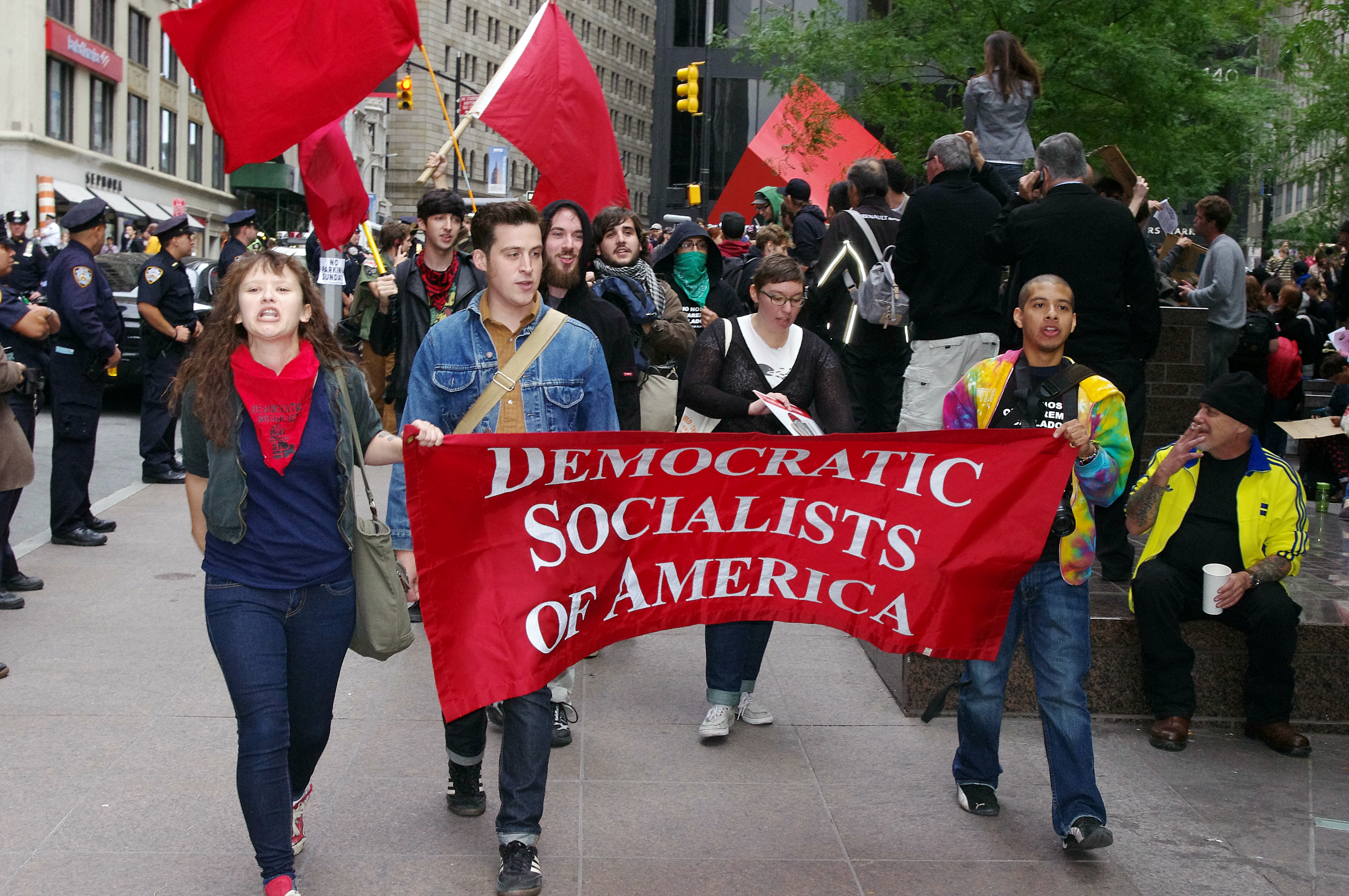
DSA members marching at an Occupy Wall Street protest in New York City, 2011

In the 2000 presidential election, the organization was divided and took no official position, with prominent members like Cornel West supporting Green Party nominee Ralph Nader while others reluctantly supported Democratic nominee Al Gore. After the 9/11 attacks, DSA actively participated in the anti-war movement against the wars in Iraq and Afghanistan and developed an "Economic Justice Agenda" that prefigured many of the proposals of the 2016 Sanders campaign.

In 2011, longtime YDS leader Maria Svart was hired as National Director. In the wake of movements like Occupy Wall Street in 2011, Fight for $15 in 2012, and Black Lives Matter in 2013, the socialist movement began to gain new steam. By 2012, membership stood at 6,500. In 2014, an internal Left Caucus formed that challenged some of DSA's stances and advocated a pro–Boycott, Divestment and Sanctions (BDS) position, which at the time was difficult to discuss within the organization.

=== Resurgence (2016–present) ===
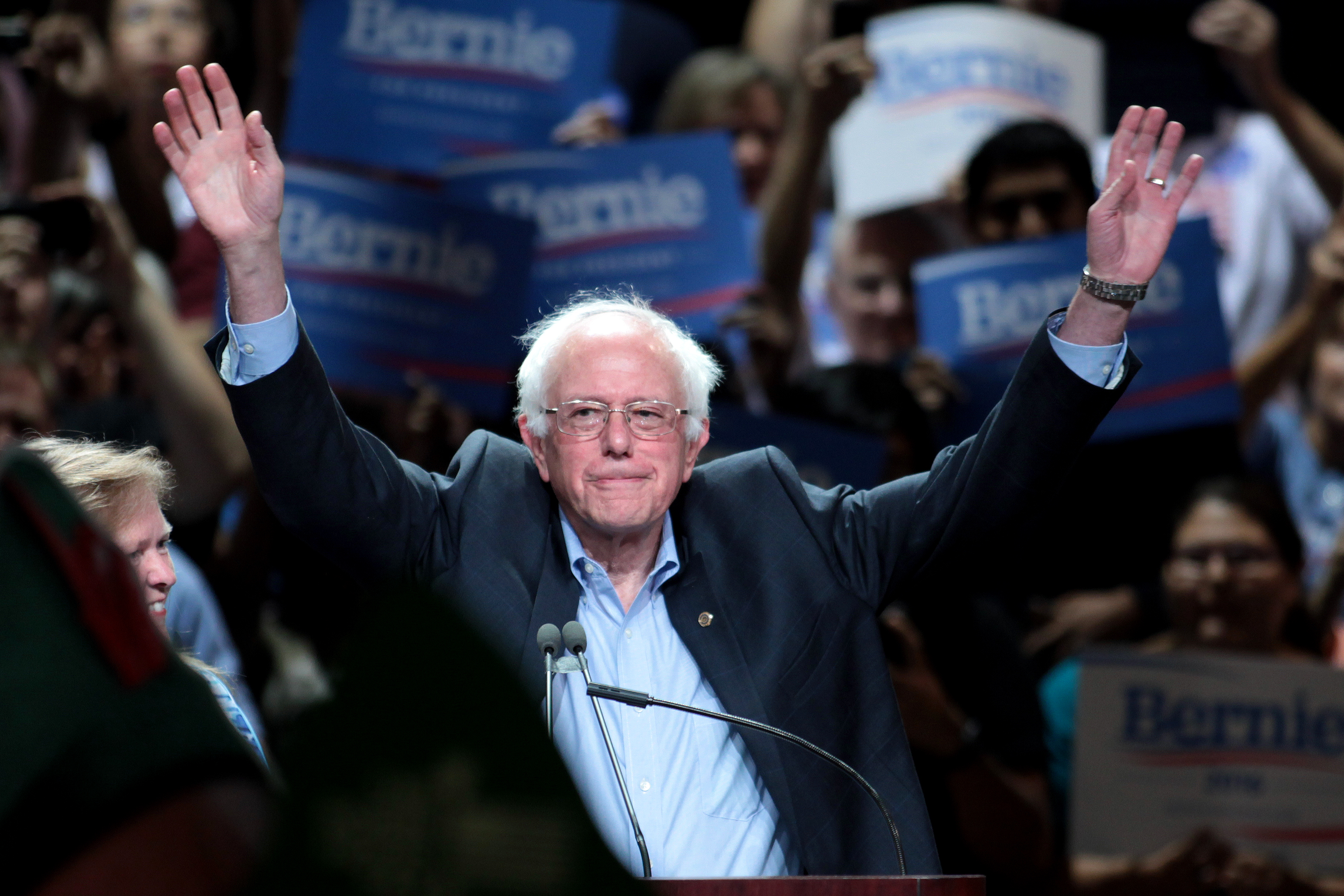
The 2016 presidential campaign of Bernie Sanders was a major catalyst for DSA's resurgence.

The 2016 presidential primary campaign of Bernie Sanders was a turning point for DSA. An independent senator from Vermont and self-described democratic socialist, Sanders brought the term "democratic socialism" into mainstream US politics. DSA, which had been urging Sanders to run, endorsed him in December 2014, becoming one of the only major socialist organizations to do so, and its members became active volunteers in his campaign. DSA members organized a Socialist Caucus at the 2016 Democratic National Convention.

The campaign, followed by the election of Donald Trump in November 2016, triggered a massive influx of new, mostly young, members, a phenomenon known as the "Trump bump". The organization grew from 6,500 members in the fall of 2014 to 8,500 by Election Day 2016. The day after Trump's election, 1,000 new members joined. By July 2017, DSA's membership had reached 24,000; by the end of 2018, it was 55,000; and by 2021, it peaked at 94,000 before experiencing a decline.

The median age of members dropped from 68 in 2013 to 33 in 2017. The organization was transformed, in the words of one commentator, from a "musty debate club for retired social democrats into an electoral powerhouse of young, ecumenical radicals". At its 2017 national convention, the majority of delegates elected to the National Political Committee were new members; the committee passed proposals to leave the Socialist International, formally endorse the BDS movement, and prioritize a national campaign for Medicare for All.

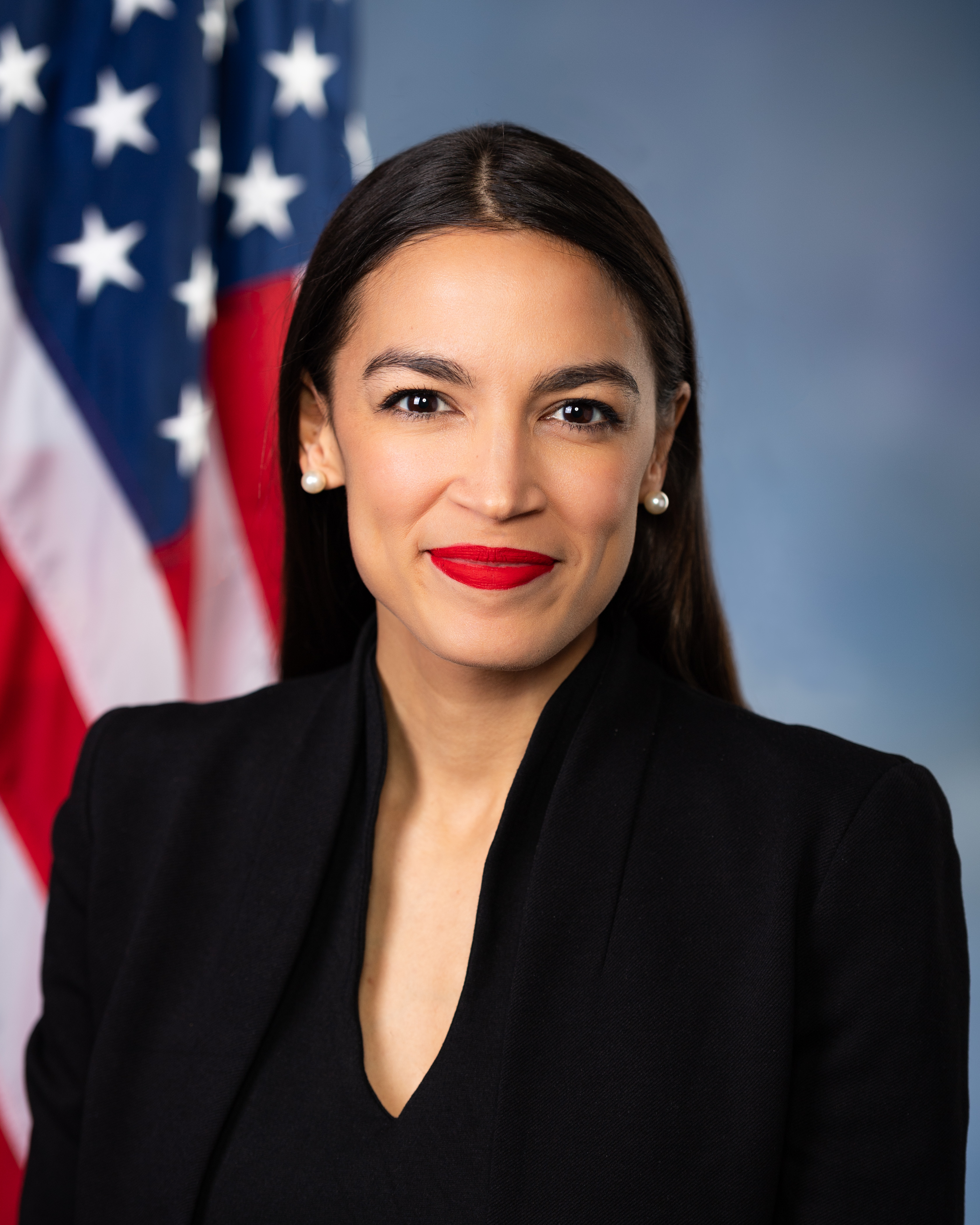
Alexandria Ocasio-Cortez, elected in 2018

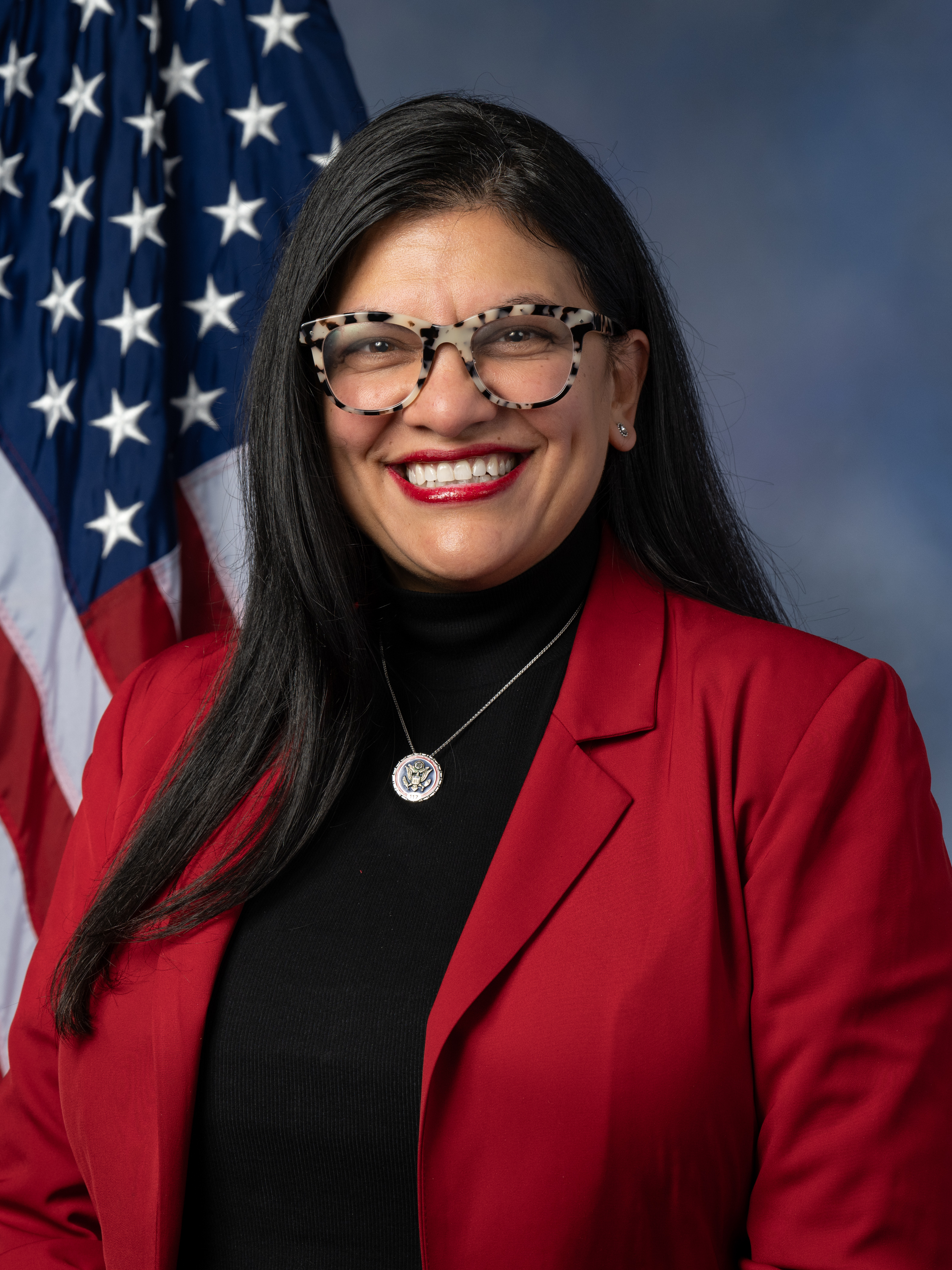
Rashida Tlaib, elected in 2018

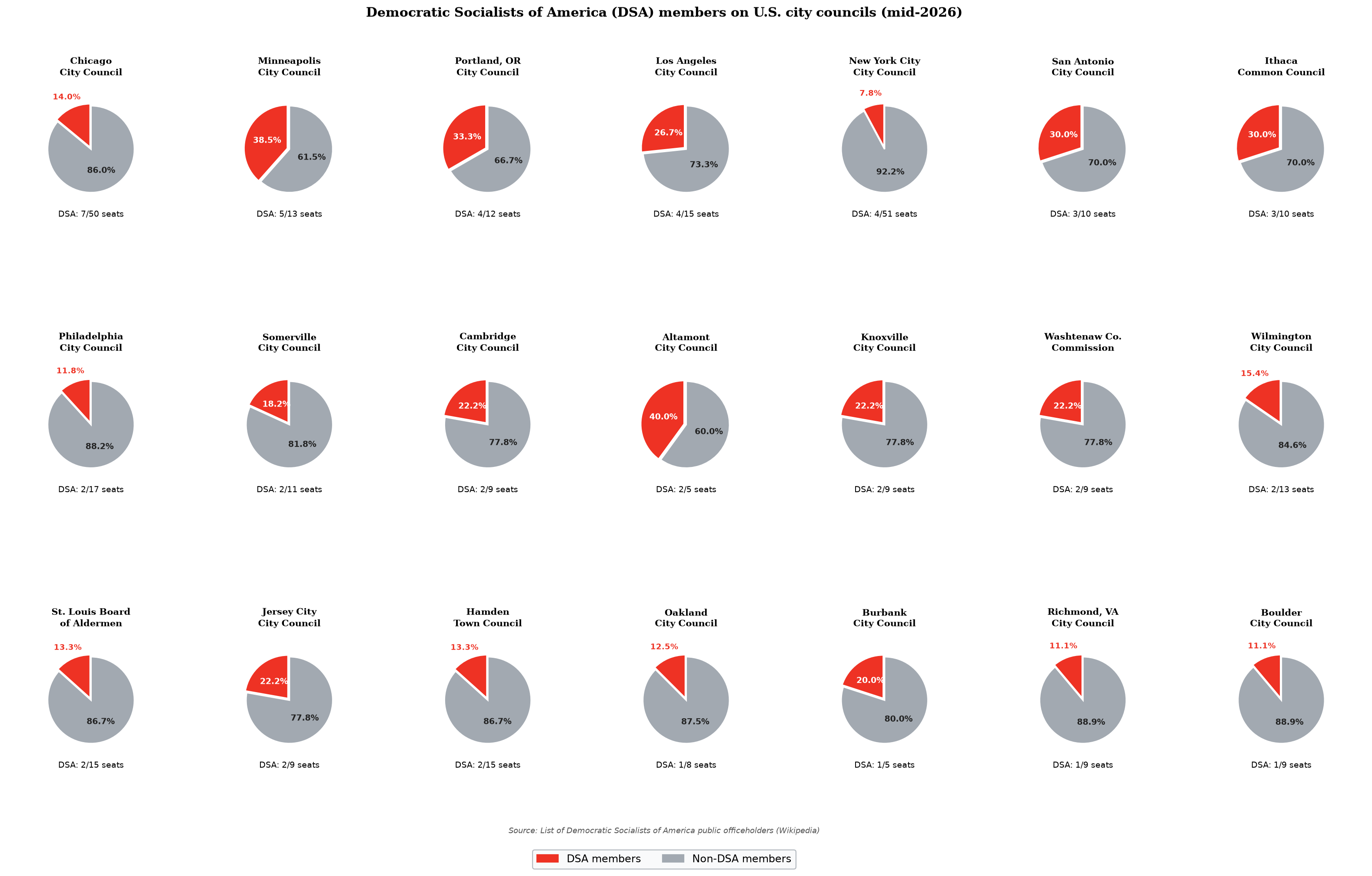
The percentage of DSA officials and endorsees in various US city councils, June 2026

This resurgence was reinforced by electoral victories. In 2017, fifteen DSA members were elected to local and state offices across the country, including Lee J. Carter to the Virginia House of Delegates. In the 2018 midterm elections, DSA member Alexandria Ocasio-Cortez won a primary upset against incumbent Congressman Joe Crowley in New York's 14th congressional district, becoming a national political star. The victory of Ocasio-Cortez, who had been endorsed and supported by DSA, triggered another large influx of members in July 2018.

In 2018, DSA member Rashida Tlaib won a primary for a congressional seat in Detroit. Both Ocasio-Cortez and Tlaib won in the general election, though DSA noted that these were not "home-grown" DSA campaigns in the way that later victories were, such as Julia Salazar's 2018 win in the New York State Senate, the election of a six-member socialist slate to the Chicago City Council in 2019, a five-member slate to the New York State Legislature in 2020, and two members to the New York City Council in 2021.

In 2021, a slate of DSA members was elected to Nevada Democratic Party's leadership, though some party staff resigned in protest, and a more moderate "unity" slate was elected to replace them in 2023. As of August 2025, over 250 DSA members held public office, with 90% elected after 2019; that included 96 city councilors and county commissioners and eight mayors or county executives. DSA members made up significant blocs on several major city councils, including seven of 50 seats in Chicago (where they formed an official Democratic Socialist Caucus), four of 12 seats in Portland, Oregon, four of 13 in Minneapolis, and four of 15 in Los Angeles.

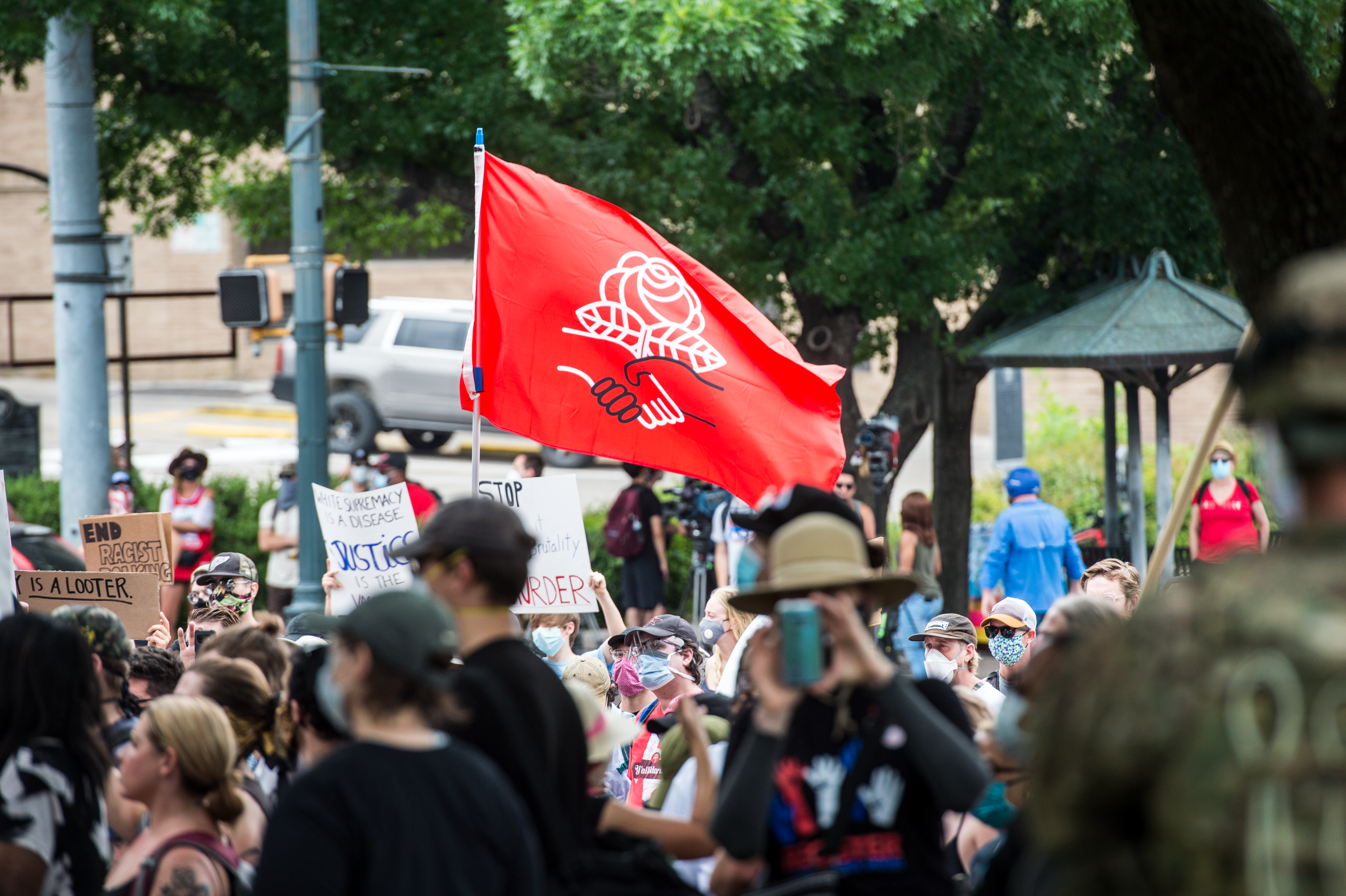
A DSA flag at a George Floyd protest in Austin, Texas, 2020

==== Dirty break strategy ====
This growth transformed the organization's character and strategy. It moved from a system of annual mailed membership checks to monthly recurring payments tied to income, and its nonprofit arm hired communications professionals who had previously worked on mainstream Democratic campaigns. DSA shifted away from the realignment strategy of working within the party establishment, instead adopting an electoral model focused on building its own independent capacity to run openly socialist candidates accountable to DSA's political agenda, often in primaries against incumbent Democrats.

This strategy has been described as a "dirty break" aiming to build a "self-standing political force" that could eventually lead to a new labor-socialist party. The 2019 national convention formally endorsed Sanders's 2020 presidential campaign and affirmed the organization's commitment to building an independent, working-class political organization. Consistent with its electoral strategy, DSA did not endorse Democratic nominee Hillary Clinton in 2016. In 2020, it organized its members to vote and organize against Trump after Sanders lost the Democratic nomination to Joe Biden.

The strategy also created conflict with the Democratic establishment; in the 2021 Buffalo mayoral election, DSA-backed primary winner India Walton was defeated in the general election by incumbent Byron Brown, who ran as a write-in candidate and framed his victory as a "rebuke of socialism". The organization made no endorsement in the 2024 presidential election, with its National Political Committee releasing a statement that read, "This choice sucks; join DSA so we can have a good option someday." Many DSA members actively campaigned against Trump and for the Democratic Party in 2024, but many were unwilling due to the Democratic Party's stance on Palestine.

==== 2020s foreign policy debates ====
DSA's growth was accompanied by internal controversies that reflected its strategic debates, particularly on foreign policy. In 2021, an internal crisis was sparked when Representative Jamaal Bowman, a DSA member, voted to provide funding for Israel's Iron Dome missile defense system, a vote that many members saw as a betrayal of the organization's pro-Palestinian stance. After the National Political Committee (NPC) declined to expel Bowman, its BDS Working Group continued a campaign against him, leading the NPC to de-charter the working group for violating the organization's code of conduct.

In June 2021, delegates from the DSA visited Venezuela and met with President Nicolás Maduro to "build solidarity". They expressed their support for him, with a delegate tweeting, "Who I met is not a dictator." Local socialists criticized the DSA's decision to support Maduro's government, follow the approved itinerary, and not meet with local activists.

In the weeks before the 2022 Russian invasion of Ukraine, DSA's International Committee released a statement condemning NATO expansion but not Russia's military buildup, drawing condemnation from other progressives. Although DSA's NPC later released a second statement condemning the invasion, the International Committee's initial response was criticized as a liability for the organization and its elected officials. As of 2026, the DSA itself opposes military aid to Ukraine.

After the October 7 attacks on Israel and the start of the Gaza war in 2023, DSA condemned the violence against all civilians and the subsequent Gaza genocide. In 2024, DSA's National Political Committee withdrew its endorsement of Ocasio-Cortez over her support for a House resolution stating that "denying Israel's right to exist is a form of antisemitism"; her local chapter, NYC-DSA, maintained its endorsement. The dispute continued into 2025, with resolutions submitted for the DSA national convention to formally censure Ocasio-Cortez and review her membership over her vote against cutting funding for Israel's Iron Dome system.

In contrast, DSA stood by Representatives Bowman, Cori Bush, Ilhan Omar, and Rashida Tlaib after they adopted strong pro-Palestinian positions. All faced primary challenges in 2024 from centrist Democrats heavily funded by the American Israel Public Affairs Committee (AIPAC); Bowman lost his primary after AIPAC spent a record $14.5 million against him, and Bush was also defeated. DSA members such as Harrington biographer Maurice Isserman left after 41 years, calling the organization's response to the Gaza War "morally bankrupt". Others have left to form separate pro-Palestine groups, arguing DSA was not progressive enough.

==== Lull during Biden administration ====
After its 2021 peak of 93,000, the organization's membership began to decline, dropping to 64,000 by October 2024, leading to a budget crisis and national director Svart's resignation in January 2024. At the contentious 2025 national convention in Chicago, delegates passed a resolution called "For a Fighting Anti-Zionist DSA", which called for the expulsion of members and endorsed elected officials who provide "material support to Israel" or related lobbying groups or make statements such as "Israel has a right to defend itself". An amendment to remove the expulsion clause was defeated, but 40% of delegates opposed the final resolution. The convention also passed a resolution to run a socialist presidential candidate in 2028, likely on the Democratic ballot line, after a debate in which a push for a third-party run was defeated.

==== Second Trump administration ====
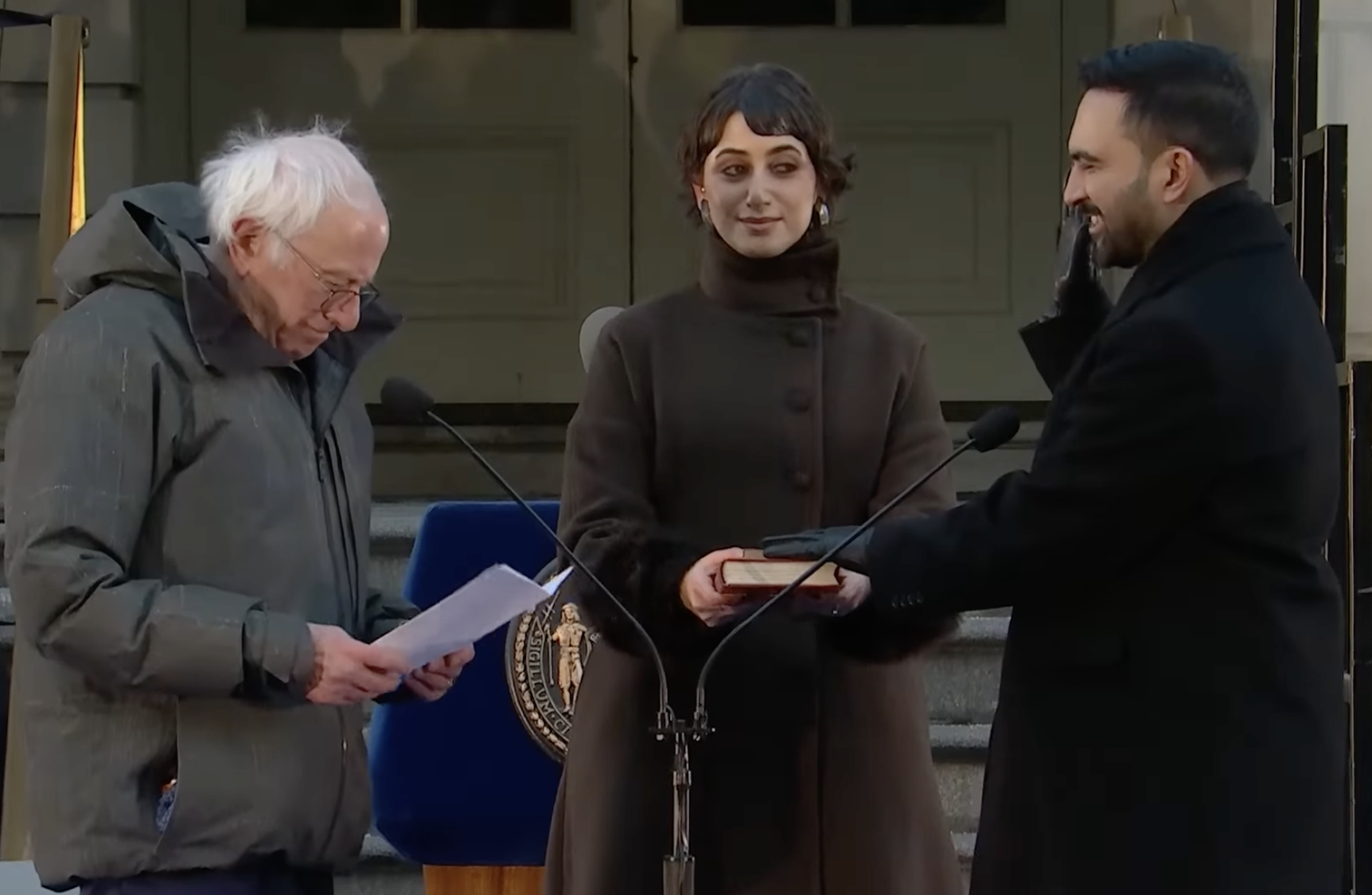
Zohran Mamdani being sworn in as Mayor of New York City by Bernie Sanders, 2026

In November 2025, NYC-DSA, the country's largest chapter, secured what was called the biggest electoral victory in DSA history with the election of member Zohran Mamdani as mayor, despite tens of millions of dollars in super PAC spending in support of Andrew Cuomo during the primary and general election. Mamdani's victory over Cuomo in the Democratic primary was energized by a massive grassroots canvassing effort organized by NYC-DSA, which provided an early endorsement and a legion of volunteers. Mamdani's platform included free bus service, frozen rents, universal childcare, and a higher minimum wage. He said during his campaign that his platform differed from that of DSA, taking a more moderate stance on issues like eliminating misdemeanor offenses and defunding the police.

DSA saw a surge in membership after the 2024 presidential election. During Mamdani's campaign, DSA's membership nearly doubled, from 50,000 to over 95,000, and membership reached 100,000 in February 2026. In July 2026, DSA membership passed 120,000 members, surpassing the Socialist Party of America to become the largest socialist organization in US history. DSA released a platform, titled Workers Deserve More, in July 2026.

In June 2026, The Wall Street Journal editorial board argued that the biggest political story of 2026, after the decline of Trump's popularity, was the rise of DSA. Media coverage credited Mamdani's popularity and influence for NYC-DSA's sweep in the 2026 elections, including victories by House candidates Claire Valdez and Darializa Avila Chevalier. Chris Rabb, Melat Kiros, Donavan McKinney, and Angela Gonzales-Torres all won additional House seats across the country; Avila Chevalier, Kiros, McKinney and Gonzales-Torres ousted incumbent representatives. NPR called the outcome "historic" for the movement. In statewide races, Wisconsin gubernatorial candidate Francesca Hong ran with the support of her state's DSA chapters, narrowly losing the Democratic nomination. The organization's success in major municipal elections continued; Janeese Lewis George won the Washington, D.C., mayoral election, while Nithya Raman defeated incumbent Karen Bass in the Los Angeles mayoral election.

Internal controversy about Raman's mayoral candidacy emerged after the National Political Committee discovered that DSA-LA's endorsement form had no questions about the BDS movement, a requirement under the national "R22" resolution. A late effort to rescind Raman's local endorsement through the NPC narrowly failed.

In court filings from August 2026 in cases of federal charges against Minnesota activists opposed to Operation Metro Surge, it was revealed that the United States Immigration and Customs Enforcement Homeland Security Investigations unit had used administrative warrants, undercover agents, and technical means to surveil the Minnesota DSA along with labor unions, activist groups, and others engaged in conduct largely protected by the First Amendment.

== Ideology and political positions ==
DSA is a multi-tendency organization, encompassing a wide range of socialist and left-wing viewpoints. The organization's core commitment is to democratic socialism, which it distinguishes from both bureaucratic forms of socialism and capitalist social democracy, arguing that democratic socialism goes further than the latter's model of a strong welfare state operating under capitalism. This has sometimes led to internal semantic debates; some longtime members have argued for emphasizing the word "democratic" to distinguish the movement from authoritarian states, while others have argued the term is redundant, as true socialism's interest in equity "encompasses democracy". The DSA says it rejects "authoritarian visions of socialism".

=== Economic policy ===
DSA's economic vision calls for a "democratic transformation of the institutions of civil society, particularly those in the economic sphere". The organization defines this as wanting "to collectively own the key economic drivers that dominate our lives, such as energy production and transportation". This involves a mixture of public ownership, worker ownership, and market mechanisms. The organization's 2016 "Resistance Rising" strategy document advocated that large, strategically important sectors like housing, utilities, and heavy industry be subject to democratic planning, while market-driven worker-owned firms would produce and distribute consumer goods.

The organization supports a broad range of what democratic socialist writer André Gorz termed "non-reformist reforms" or "structural reforms". Acknowledging that an immediate end to capitalism is unlikely, this strategy involves fighting for reforms that weaken corporate power, increase the power of working people, and point toward a world beyond capitalism. At the local level, this has included campaigns for government-run grocery stores, free public transportation, and universal rent freezes. Key platform planks include:

- Labor rights: Strengthening protections for workers' rights to strike and form a union, and implementing a 32-hour workweek with no reduction in pay or benefits. Support union members organizing rank-and-file caucuses to democratize their unions.
- Healthcare for All: guaranteeing universal healthcare with no cost to individuals, co-pays, or deductibles, and with guarantees for reproductive and gender-affirming care. Ensure free medical education and training along with expanding public healthcare facilities.
- Taxing the wealthy: Raising taxes on the highest earners, for-profit corporations, and large inheritances, and establishing a wealth tax.
- Universal education: Free public education from pre-kindergarten through college, including tuition-free higher education with no out-of-pocket costs for room and board and cancellation of all student loan debt; universal child care; and expansive paid family leave for all workers. These universal programs are seen as "engines of solidarity" that build a broad constituency for social rights, in contrast to means-tested programs that can create division.
- Green New Deal: A massive mobilization to transition the economy to renewable energy, create millions of high-wage jobs through a federal jobs guarantee, and achieve net-zero greenhouse gas emissions through public investment and public ownership of major energy and transportation infrastructure. The term was popularized in part by DSA member Alexandria Ocasio-Cortez, whose Green New Deal Resolution had a significant influence on the 2022 Inflation Reduction Act. Within DSA's ecosocialist framework, some tendencies also advocate for degrowth, which seeks to intentionally reduce wasteful economic production and consumption to prevent climate catastrophe.
- Social ownership: Public ownership of the largest corporations and essential industries.
- Data centers: The DSA opposes the rapid expansion of AI data centers.

=== Electoral strategy ===
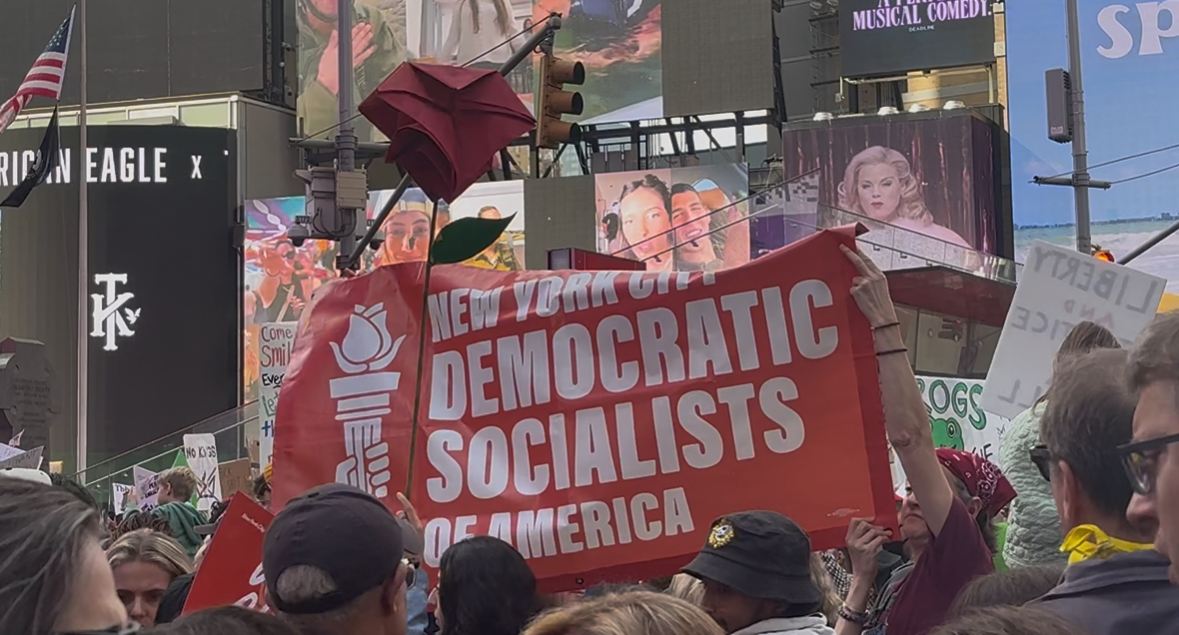
A DSA banner at the October 2025 No Kings protests

For much of its history, DSA followed Michael Harrington's strategy of political realignment, working to elect progressives within the Democratic Party in the hope of transforming it from within. Following its post-2016 growth, DSA's strategy shifted significantly. The organization now prioritizes building its own independent electoral capacity to run socialist candidates who are accountable to DSA's agenda, often in primaries against incumbent Democrats.

This strategy is often called a "dirty break" from the Democratic Party, an approach influenced by a 2016 article, "A Blueprint for a New Party", published in the socialist magazine Jacobin. The goal is not to immediately form a third party, which is seen as "suicidal in America's two-party tyranny", but to "bore from within in guerrilla insurgency fashion" by using the Democratic ballot line to build an independent political force.

The New York City chapter, DSA's largest and most electorally successful, developed a blueprint that became a model for the national organization. This involves a democratic process to select races and candidates, a massive volunteer-led field organizing program, and a coordinated fundraising arm called "DSA For The Many". Other strategic orientations within the organization include the "realignment" strategy of shifting the Democratic Party leftward and the "clean break" strategy of immediately forming a third party.

The dirty break approach involves building a national movement organization with strong local chapters that can contest elections on a case-by-case basis, sometimes in Democratic primaries and sometimes independently, with the long-term goal of a "mass socialist political formation". This approach was formalized at the organization's 2023 national convention, which passed a resolution to "Act Like an Independent Party" by developing its own fundraising, candidate schools, and voter lists.

This strategy has also produced internal debate about the proper role of socialist legislators. One view is that their primary role is agitational—to "fight people who are against our policies" and politicize the obstacles to socialist reform. Another view is that socialists must also participate in the legislative process, working with progressives and even centrists to pass reforms that benefit the working class. The strategy includes holding its endorsed candidates accountable to the organization's platform. Candidates endorsed by the NYC chapter, for instance, are expected to function as a bloc and attend weekly "Socialists in Office Committee" meetings to coordinate strategy.

In 2018, the New York City chapter criticized Ocasio-Cortez for suggesting she would rally behind all Democratic nominees, including Governor Andrew Cuomo, whom the chapter considered a political enemy. This strategy was reaffirmed at the 2025 national convention, where delegates voted to encourage running a socialist presidential candidate in 2028 on the Democratic ballot line, rejecting an amendment that would have pushed for an independent third-party run.

=== Social issues ===
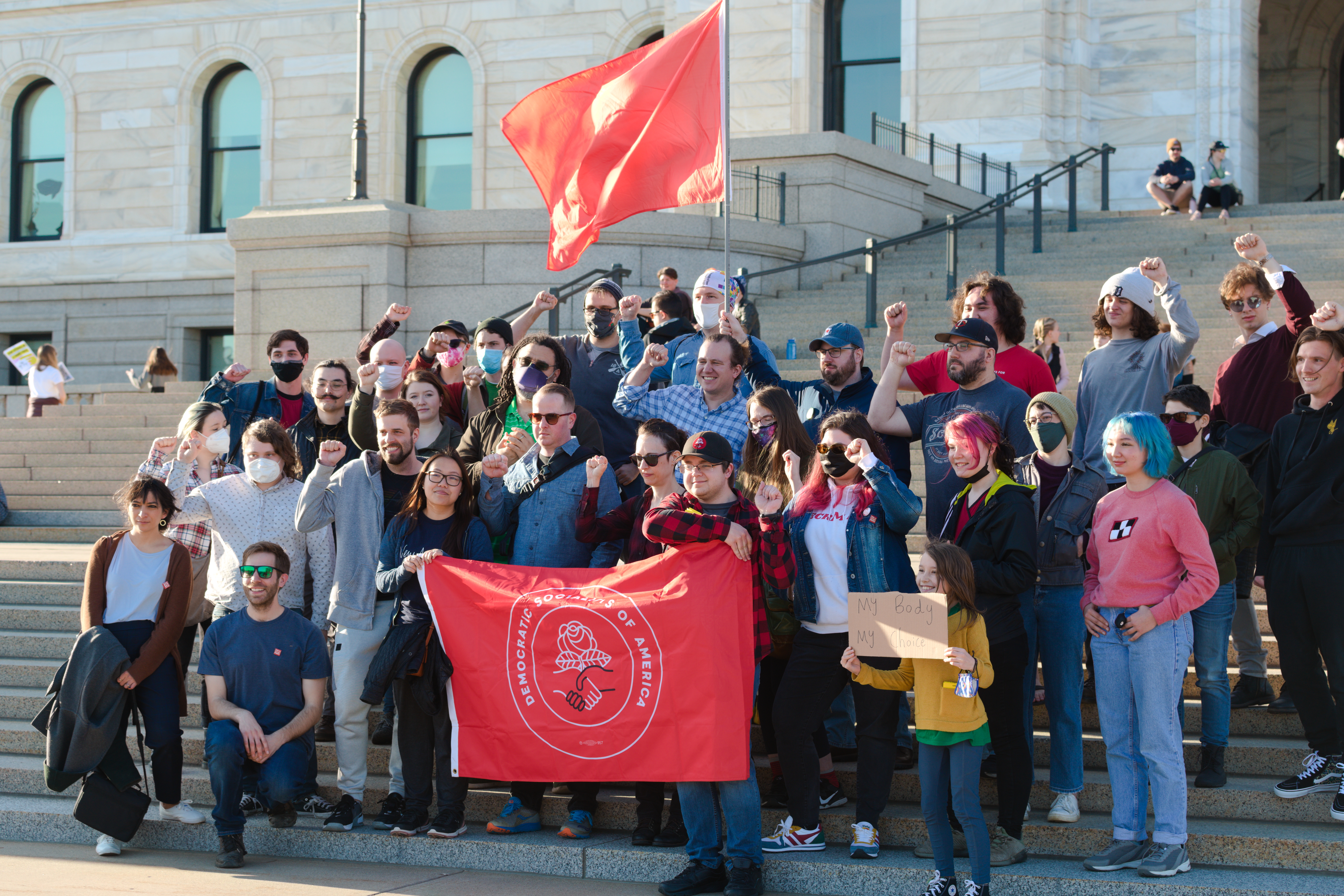
DSA members at a pro-choice demonstration at the Minnesota State Capitol, 2022

DSA's platform describes itself as "deeply feminist and antiracist". According to the organization's 2016 strategy document, democratic socialism "connects antiracist, feminist, LGBTQ, labor, anti-ableist, and anti-ageist movements to each other" because each struggle's success depends on the success of the others. At its 2019 national convention, DSA passed a resolution calling for the full decriminalization of sex work.

=== Foreign policy and immigration ===
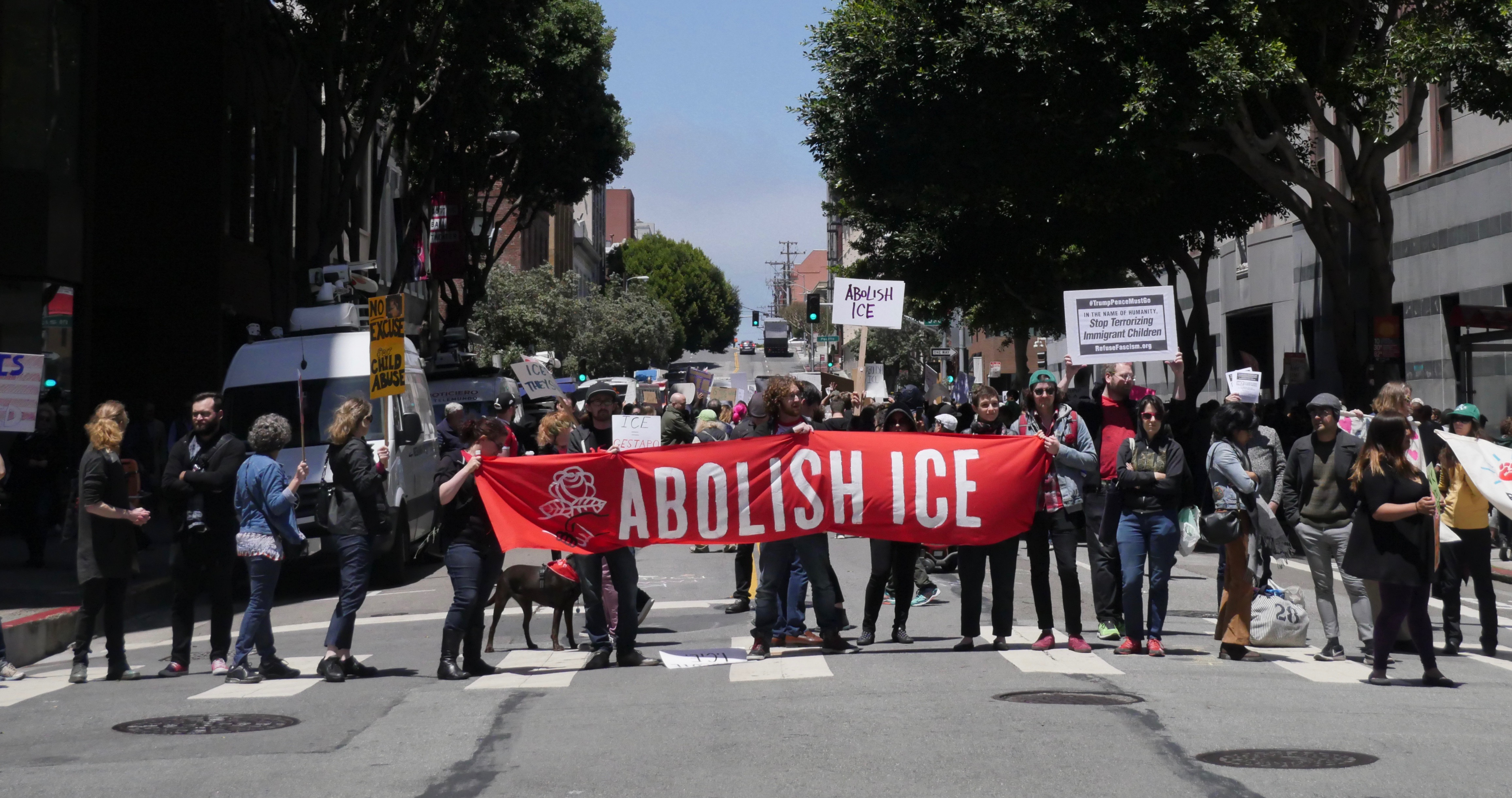
DSA members holding an "Abolish ICE" banner at a protest in San Francisco, 2018

DSA advocates an anti-imperialist foreign policy based on international working-class solidarity.

Its platform calls for:

- Withdrawal from NATO and an end to foreign military aid.

==== Russian-Ukrainian war ====
DSA's International Committee condemned the Russian invasion of Ukraine, but accused NATO and the United States of provoking Russia and opposed military aid to Ukraine. Both stances have caused disagreement within the organization, with some pushing for a more pro-Ukrainian stance.

==== Israeli–Palestinian conflict ====
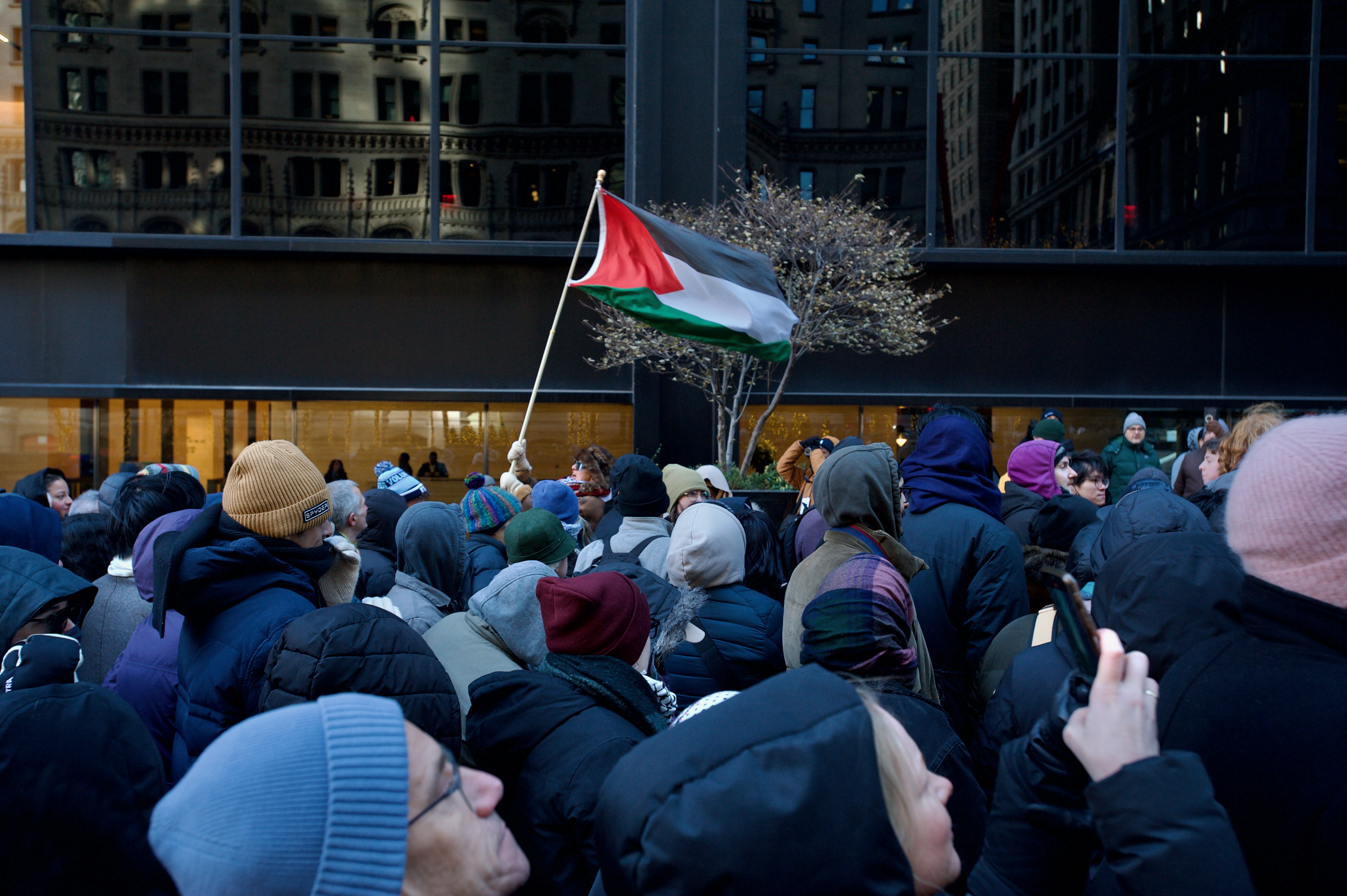
A Palestinian flag flown in the crowd of Zohran Mamdani's inauguration

DSA supports Palestinian rights, an immediate ceasefire in Gaza, an end to US military and economic aid to Israel, and the establishment of a Palestinian state with Jerusalem as its capital. The organization's anti-Zionist position was further defined at its 2025 national convention. Delegates passed a resolution that established "red lines" for members and endorsed officials, threatening expulsion for providing "material support to Israel or related lobbying groups like AIPAC or J Street" or affirming that "Israel has a right to defend itself". An amendment to remove the expulsion clause was defeated, though 40% of delegates opposed the final resolution. The resolution's passage followed years of internal debate over the actions of endorsed representatives like Jamaal Bowman and Alexandria Ocasio-Cortez concerning Israel.

Over the months after the Gaza war began, various DSA chapters and DSA rank-and-file members and public officials organized and participated in protests and vigils alongside Jewish and Palestinian advocacy groups, including Jewish Voice for Peace, IfNotNow, and Students for Justice in Palestine, in support of a ceasefire and Palestine. After the October 7 attacks, the DSA NPC issued a statement condemning all violence against civilians and saying the attacks were a response to Israeli occupation.

==== Iran ====
DSA opposes US and Israeli military action against Iran.

==== China ====
According to The Times, DSA delegations have visited China on multiple occasions and one delegation attended the 2025 China Victory Day Parade. Some DSA members were reported to have signed pledges to "support the People's Republic of China and to promote understanding of Chinese socialism."

After the election to the Florida House of Representatives in November 2026 of Ashley Herrmann, a DSA-supported candidate, Florida attorney general James Uthmeier filed a subpoena against the DSA and its Florida chapters seeking to determine if they had obtained "contributions or support from foreign sources of concern" from sources including China, which would violate state fundraising law.

==== Immigration ====
DSA supports open borders and freedom of movement for all people. Its platform calls for the abolition of ICE and amnesty for immigrants already in the United States.

=== Democratic reform ===
The organization's platform calls for fundamental reforms to the US political system. These include:

- Universal suffrage: Extending full voting rights to all residents, including noncitizens and people with criminal convictions, and establishing statehood for Washington, D.C.
- Electoral reform: Replacing the Electoral College with a national popular vote for president and replacing the two-party system with a multi-party democracy through proportional representation elections.
- Legislative reform: Expanding the number of seats in the House and abolishing the Senate.
- Judicial reform: Limiting the Supreme Court's power of judicial review.
- Constitutional reform: Replacing the current Constitution with a new one.

=== Labor strategy ===
After its post-2016 resurgence, DSA embraced a "rank-and-file strategy" for the labor movement, influenced by Kim Moody's writings. This approach involves socialist organizers taking jobs in key industries to become active shop-floor union members in order to agitate against bosses and concessionary union bureaucracies, democratize unions, and develop organic leaders from the rank and file. This strategy holds that change must come from the bottom up by building a "militant minority" of rank-and-file unionists.

At its 2019 national convention, DSA passed a resolution formally adopting the rank-and-file strategy as part of its labor work. In 2020, during the COVID-19 pandemic, DSA and the United Electrical Workers founded the Emergency Workplace Organizing Committee (EWOC) to provide training and resources to non-union workers. Despite the formal adoption of the rank-and-file strategy, some members have argued that electoral campaigns receive disproportionate attention and resources compared to labor and tenant organizing.

In 2021, the Young Democratic Socialists of America (YDSA) began the Rank-and-File Pipeline Project to place young organizers in strategic industries. DSA members were active in the reform movement in the Teamsters union that elected Sean O'Brien as president and have been involved in organizing drives at Starbucks and Amazon. This work has faced setbacks; the YDSA pipeline project was narrowly voted down at a convention, and internal divisions have arisen among DSA members within the Teamsters and United Auto Workers reform movements.

== Structure and organization ==
The 2026–2027 National Political Committee grouped by caucus affiliation Legend: Bread & Roses: 5 seats; Groundwork: 5 seats; Socialist Majority: 4 seats; Springs of Revolution: 4 seats; Red Star: 3 seats; Marxist Unity: 3 seats; Carnation: 1 seat; Reform & Revolution: 1 seat; Libertarian Socialist: 1 seat

DSA is a membership-based organization with a national structure and local chapters across the United States. Its highest decision-making body is its National Convention, held every two years. Between conventions, the organization is led by the 27-member National Political Committee (NPC), which is elected by delegates at the convention.

The red rose is part of DSA's logo, having been a symbol of socialism since the 1886 Haymarket Affair and resulting May Day marches. It was drawn from the logo of DSOC, its precursor organization, and previously of the Socialist International, which shows a stylized fist clenching a red rose, the fist replaced by a biracial handshake symbolizing DSA's antiracism. The fist and rose logo was originally designed for the French Socialist Party in 1969 and later shared by socialist and labor political organizations worldwide.

=== Members ===
Anyone who pays dues or files a dues waiver may join DSA. The post-2016 membership is significantly younger than the pre-2016 organization. Median age decreased from 68 in 2015 to 33 in 2026. As of 2021, 80% of members aged 25 or older have a college degree. 10% of members are teachers and academics; 6% are retail, food service, and other service sector workers; and 4% are blue-collar workers. 20% of DSA members are union members.

In 2026, Democratic Left reported that a new survey showed a 66% white and 34% nonwhite membership. Since its rebirth, the organization has also focused on developing a layer of "cadre"—politically developed and dedicated organizers—in numbers not seen on the American left in decades.

=== Caucuses and factions ===
Following its rapid growth after 2016, DSA developed a number of internal caucuses organized around specific ideological tendencies or strategic priorities. These factions are often broadly grouped into a "left wing", which supports revolutionary socialism and a clear break from the Democratic Party, and a "right wing," which advocates reformist socialism or the democratic road to socialism and a more flexible electoral strategy.

The caucuses are a visible presence at DSA's national conventions, where the vast majority of attendees are affiliated with at least one. Many members view the open disagreement and debate between and within caucuses as an intentional and healthy feature of the organization's political life.

=== International affiliations ===
DSA was a member of the Socialist International from 1982 to 2017. A majority of delegates at the 2017 DSA National Convention voted to leave the International due to its alleged support for neoliberal economic policies.

Delegates at the 2021 DSA National Convention voted to apply to join the São Paulo Forum, and DSA became an Associate Member organization in 2023.

In August 2023, the DSA National Convention voted to join the Progressive International, and DSA became an official member in October 2023.

== See also ==
- DSA chapters:
  - Atlanta Democratic Socialists of America
  - Chicago Democratic Socialists of America
  - Los Angeles Democratic Socialists of America
  - Metro DC Democratic Socialists of America
  - New York City Democratic Socialists of America
  - Seattle Democratic Socialists of America
- DSA members:
  - List of Democratic Socialists of America public officeholders
  - List of socialist members of the United States Congress
  - Category:Members of the Democratic Socialists of America
- History of socialism in the United States:
  - Socialism in the United States
  - American Left
