= New American Movement =

Left-wing political movement founded in 1971

- Predecessor: Students for a Democratic Society
- Merged into: Democratic Socialists of America
- Formation: 1971
- Founded at: Davenport, Iowa
- Dissolved: 1982
- Purpose: New Left activism
- Location: United States

The New American Movement (NAM) was an American New Left multi-tendency socialist and feminist political organization established in 1971.

The NAM continued an independent existence until 1982, when it merged with Michael Harrington's Democratic Socialist Organizing Committee to establish the Democratic Socialists of America.

== Organizational history ==
=== Establishment ===
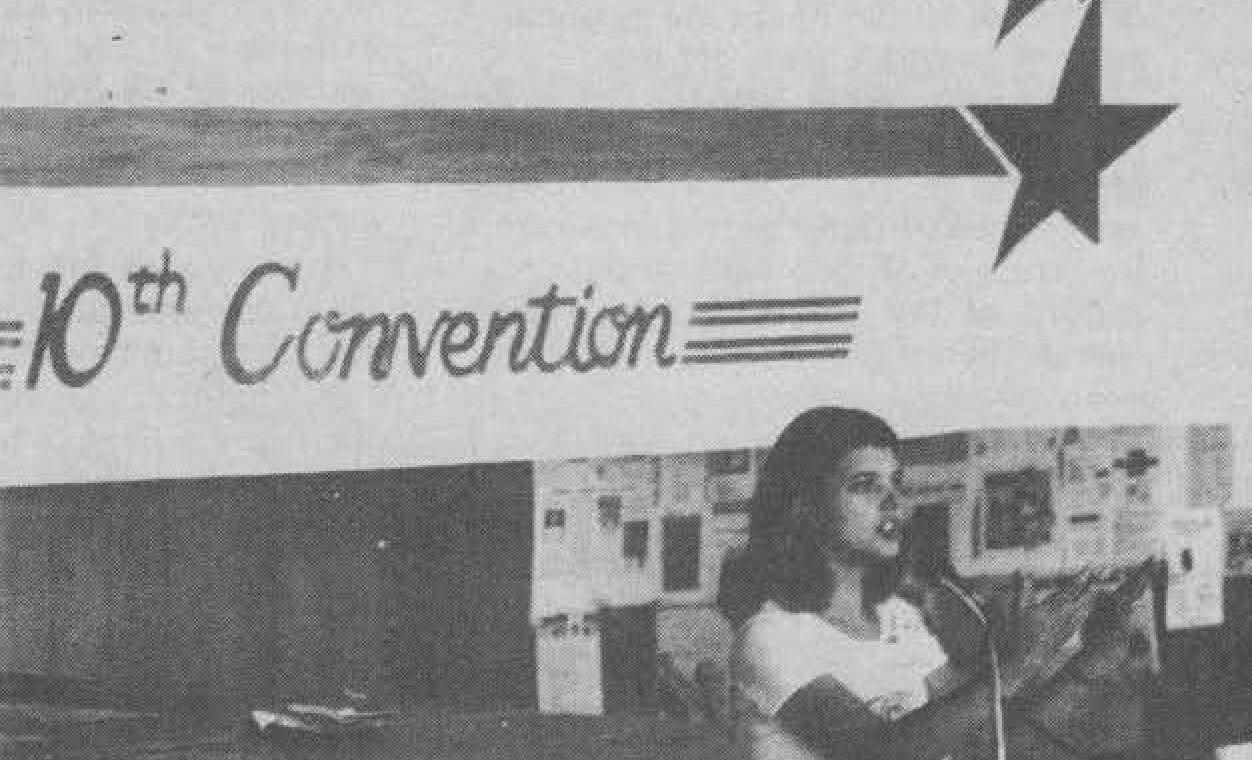
NAM's 10th convention, held in 1981 in Chicago

The NAM was established at a conference held in Davenport, Iowa, in December 1971 by radical political activists seeking to create a successor organization to Students for a Democratic Society (SDS). SDS, the leading organization of the New Left movement in the United States, had recently disintegrated into warring political sects and the need was perceived for a broad-based new organization free of sectarian rancor.

The founding activists behind the NAM were vigorous opponents of the war in Vietnam who sought a new organization to serve as a forum for discussing where and how to redirect their activities. The call to convene was issued by Michael Lerner. Lerner became distant from the organization shortly after it was founded and went on to start the magazine Tikkun.

In its early years, the NAM shared much of the political framework of the New Communist Movement, but rejected the strategy of building a "vanguard party", a position prominent NAM members defended in a debate in the pages of The Guardian. The organization was built around local groups called "chapters" which emphasized Marxist study, discussion of contemporary issues, support of local labor actions and work in the community to raise awareness.

The national headquarters of NAM were located in Chicago.

=== Development ===
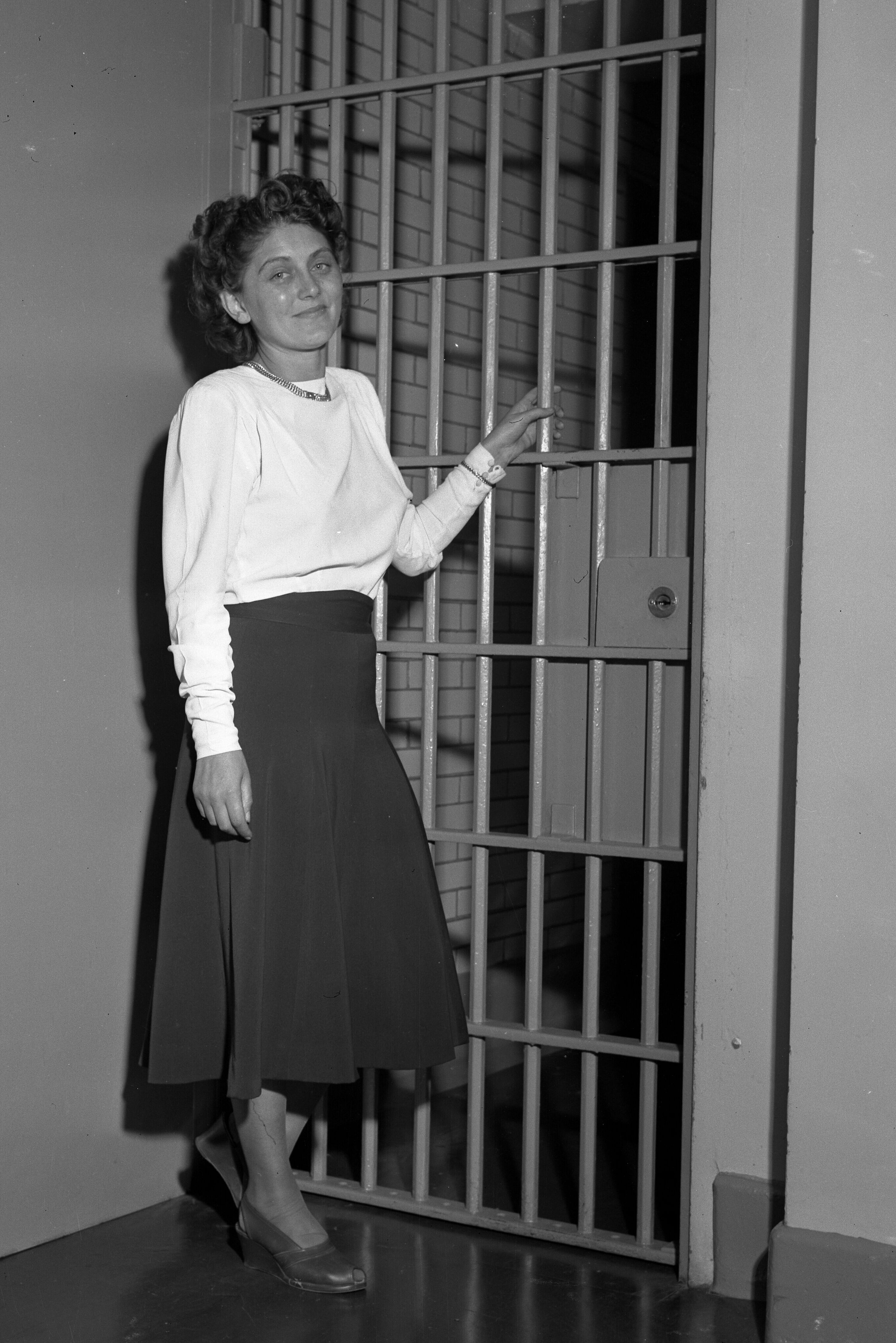
Healey standing before a jail cell in Los Angeles, California in 1949

By the early 1980s, after a great change in the American political climate and the departure of some of its more radical members, the NAM had moved away from its original neo-Leninist orientation. It adopted a more traditionally social democratic outlook, culminating in a merger with the Democratic Socialist Organizing Committee (DSOC) in 1982 to form the Democratic Socialists of America (DSA). At the time of the merger, the NAM claimed 2,500 members.

Richard Healey, son of Los Angeles Communist Party USA (CPUSA) leader Dorothy Healey, was a NAM leader from its founding in 1971. After his mother resigned from the CPUSA in 1973, Healey worked on recruiting her to the NAM, which she joined in 1974. In 1975, Dorothy joined Richard on the NAM's National Interim Committee and later became a Vice Chair of the DSA in 1982.

The NAM made use of comparatively high membership dues which were tiered on the basis of the member's income. According to one analyst, total membership of the organization never exceeded 1,500 at any point in the group's existence. Membership was based almost wholly in large metropolitan areas and on college campuses. NAM activity often took the form of a group study circle dedicated to the collective study of Marxist or feminist writings. The group was ultimately hampered by its limited size and seeming inability to progress beyond the realm of doctrinal discourse into the world of practical politics.

=== Press organs ===
The NAM's official organ was a magazine called Movin' On. The independent journals Radical America and Socialist Revolution (later Socialist Review) were also vaguely associated with the NAM as were the weekly independent socialist newspapers The Guardian and In These Times which had their share of supporters both within NAM and in other radical groups.

In addition to its magazine, the NAM produced several other targeted publications, including the Reproductive Rights Newsletter, dedicated to organizing to preserve women's rights of access to contraception and abortion, the Anti-Racism Bulletin and Women Organizing, a publication launched in 1979 and dedicated to questions of feminist organizing.

=== Dissolution ===
The NAM continued an independent existence until March 1982, when it voted to merge with Michael Harrington's Democratic Socialist Organizing Committee (DSOC) to establish the Democratic Socialists of America (DSA).

== Publications ==
- Hannah Frisch, et al., Working Papers on Gay-Lesbian Liberation and Socialism. Chicago: New American Movement, 1979.
- Glenn Scott (ed.), Anti-Racism Bulletin, Chicago, Illinois: New American Movement Anti-Racism Commission, Summer 1980.
- Glenn Scott, Undocumented Workers: Are They the Problem? Chicago, Illinois: New American Movement, October 1977.
