= Democratic Socialist Organizing Committee =

U.S. democratic socialist organization (1973–1982)

- The fist and rose emblem used by DSOC.
- Founder: Michael Harrington
- Founded: 1973; 53 years ago
- Dissolved: 1982; 44 years ago
- Split from: Social Democrats, USA
- Preceded by: Socialist Party of America and Democratic Socialist Federation
- Succeeded by: Democratic Socialists of America
- Ideology: Democratic socialism Anti-communism
- Political position: Left-wing
- International affiliation: Socialist International
- Colors: Red

The Democratic Socialist Organizing Committee (DSOC, /ˈdiːsɒk/ DEE-sok) was a democratic socialist political organization in the United States.

In his March 1973 DSOC founding essay, Michael Harrington envisioned a new, post-1960s democratic left coalition that went beyond the Old Left traditional socialist emphasis on organizing labor unions to build political power, and also wanted to mobilize left-liberal Democrats; civil rights, feminist, and anti-war activists; with a robust youth section from college campuses.

DSOC was formed in 1973 when Harrington led a minority caucus away from the Social Democrats, USA (SDUSA), the recently renamed and restructured Socialist Party of America (SPA), when SDUSA leadership chose not to endorse the Democratic candidate George McGovern in the 1972 presidential campaign. In Harrington's view, the South Dakota senator was clearly a better candidate than the incumbent Richard Nixon. DSOC's ranks grew during the 1970s, eventually claiming a national membership of nearly 5,000. In 1982, DSOC merged with the New American Movement to create the Democratic Socialists of America.

== Political positions ==
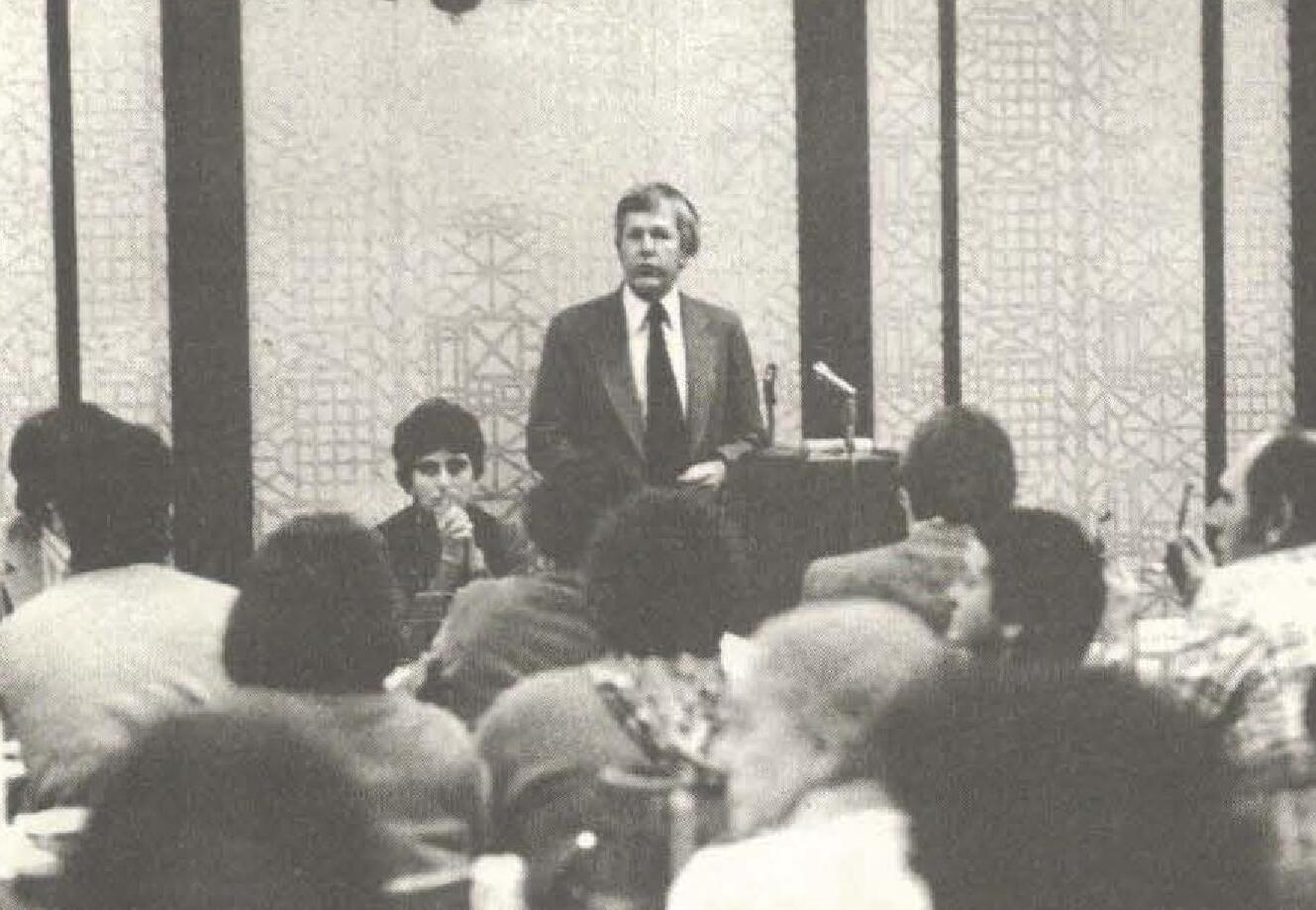
Michael Harrington addressing the 1979 DSOC convention

DSOC presented itself as an explicitly socialist organization. In electoral politics, it worked within the Democratic Party, where it aimed to broaden the base of support for "democratic-left" ideas. In Harrington's view, the task facing his organization was "to build a new American majority for social change". He often used the phrases "the left wing of the possible" and "the left wing of realism". While acknowledging the importance of trade unions, Harrington said unions alone were not sufficient to win political power. Instead he argued that a democratic socialist coalition must unite with "college-educated and issue-oriented" activists in the Democratic Party:

In 1968, the Center-Right of Nixon and Wallace received almost 58% of the votes; in 1972, in a two-way race, Nixon got over 61%. In 1968, the American unions were a major, and sometimes sole, force behind Hubert Humphrey, proving that the organized workers are the most cohesive element that can be mobilized for social change. But the '68 election also proved that labor by itself cannot come close to winning. [...] In 1968 many McCarthyites did not understand that Humphrey was infinitely preferable to Nixon; in 1972, the Meanyites did not understand that McGovern was infinitely preferable to Nixon. If this split continues, the Republicans will hold the Presidency for the foreseeable future. Therefore, the only way to build a new majority for social change is for labor and the new politics to come together.

DSOC proposed winning power through the tactic of "realignment", i.e., uniting forces within the Democratic Party on a democratic socialist platform. DSOC members ran for political office, but almost always within the Democratic Party. In addition, DSOC promoted the individual efforts of its dues payers and supporters, many of whom were active in labor unions or other political organizations. A few Committee members, e.g., California Rep. Ron Dellums and New York City Council member Ruth Messinger, won elected office. DSOC had public support from union leaders such as Victor Reuther of the United Auto Workers, William W. Winpisinger of the International Association of Machinists, and various officials of the Amalgamated Clothing Workers of America.

== History ==
=== Background ===
After years of internal acrimony, the Socialist Party of America (SPA) was headed for a split as the decade of the 1970s opened. In March 1972, SPA had merged with the Democratic Socialist Federation (DSF) to form the SPDSF, but its members were divided over two key questions:

1. Should democratic socialists call for an immediate withdrawal of all U.S. forces from Vietnam, or should they push for a negotiated peace settlement and a halt to the bombing of North Vietnam?
2. Should the democratic left continue its bedrock principle of organizing the working class via labor unions, or should it concentrate more on recruiting (predominantly middle class) political activists?

The factional fights within SPA and its youth branch, the Young People's Socialist League (YPSL), were centered on these questions of how and when to end the Vietnam War, what sort of relationship to maintain with the Democratic Party, and how to expand the democratic socialist movement. As the national SPDSF convention approached in December 1972, Michael Harrington was the leader of a faction known as the Coalition Caucus. He had complained that the SPDSF's endorsement of Democratic presidential candidate George McGovern "was not strong enough, coupled as it was with what other party leaders called 'constructive criticism,' and that members were not sufficiently active in the campaign." The majority caucus's Arch Puddington replied that the California branch was in fact very active in supporting McGovern, while the New York branch members said they had been mainly focused on a congressional race.

Despite his doctrinal differences with the YPSL, Harrington had a loyal following in the group, which was also holding its biennial convention in December. As an omen of the coming split in the SPDSF, Harrington resigned his post as Honorary Chairperson in October 1972.

=== SPDSF convention in 1972 ===
The SPDSF national convention began in late December 1972 in New York City. The two co-chairmen, Bayard Rustin of the A. Philip Randolph Institute and Charles Zimmerman of the International Ladies' Garment Workers' Union (ILGWU), were re-elected by acclamation along with SPDSF's first national vice chairman, James Glaser. In his opening speech, Rustin called for an organized effort against the "reactionary policies of the Nixon Administration", while at the same time he criticized the "irresponsibility and élitism of the 'New Politics' liberals".

At the convention, elements within the YPSL denounced what they termed the "McGovern takeover" of the Democratic Party, citing the "supercilious antilabor elitism" of the "New Politics Liberals". The dilemma facing socialists in 1972 was that in order to maintain their customary pro-labor stance, they had to ally themselves with the major U.S. trade unions, such as the AFL-CIO under President George Meany. But some of those unions had drifted to the right, for example, Meany enjoyed close ties with Nixon and often agreed with his Vietnam policies. By endorsing McGovern's call for an immediate end to the Vietnam War, Harrington set himself in opposition to sections of the U.S. labor establishment, and to many of his socialist colleagues.

The SPDSF voted 72 to 34 to rename itself Social Democrats, USA (SDUSA). The rename was meant to be "politically realistic". The New York Times observed that the Socialist Party of America (SPA) had last sponsored a U.S. presidential candidate, Darlington Hoopes, back in 1956, and he received only 2,121 votes cast in just six states. Because SPA had ceased sponsoring candidates, the name "Party" was misleading, according to the convention's majority report, because it hindered the recruiting of Democratic Party activists. The name "Socialist" was replaced by "Social Democrats" since many Americans associated socialism with Soviet Communism. SDUSA also wished to differentiate itself from two small Marxist parties, the Socialist Workers Party and the Socialist Labor Party. Harrington said he was "very saddened" by the name change:

I think it could mean not simply the abandonment of a name but of a tradition, and in an attempt to become more acceptable to the American people and the American trade unions, it would result in our giving up our socialist content. I think the Socialist party should forthrightly stand for socialism.

During the convention, the majority (Unity Caucus) won every vote by a ratio of roughly two to one. The convention elected a national committee of 33 members, with 22 seats for the Unity Caucus, eight seats for Harrington's Coalition Caucus, two for a Debs Caucus, and one for the independent Samuel H. Friedman. All of the minority caucuses as well as Friedman opposed the name change.

The convention adopted program proposals in various areas. On foreign policy, it demanded "firmness toward Communist aggression". It opposed closer relations with the Castro government in Cuba. On the Vietnam War, the convention opposed "any efforts to bomb Hanoi into submission" and instead advocated a negotiated peace agreement, which should protect Communist political cadres in South Vietnam from further military or police reprisals. Harrington's proposal for a ceasefire and a withdrawal from Vietnam by a specified date was defeated.

=== Formation of DSOC ===
Several months after the convention, Harrington ended his membership in SDUSA. He and his supporters from the Coalition Caucus soon formed DSOC. Many Debs Caucus members also resigned from SDUSA and formed the Socialist Party USA.

Despite opposing the SPDSF majority, Harrington acknowledged the validity of its members' concerns:

The anti-war activists of the sixties were overwhelmingly white and middle class. Many of them were unconcerned about the domestic political consequences of their actions and were even contemptuous of that majority of Americans who supported the war. There was a profoundly elitist tendency in the movement that [the majority of the Socialist Party leadership] denounced as dilettantish and collegiate. Moreover, there was a vocal, and regularly televised, fringe of confrontationists, exhibitionists, and Vietcong flag wavers who could plausibly be dismissed as freakish, or sinister, or both.

Harrington's Coalition Caucus sought to expand the earlier New Politics movement in the Democratic Party into a viable left-wing pressure-group, advancing an avowed socialist agenda and attempting to win support for the agenda among Democratic officeholders. Harrington led members from his caucus as well as from his other political and social networks to establish DSOC in 1973. He later referred to his small initial DSOC cadre as "the defeated remnant of an already defeated remnant".

When recounting the history of the democratic left movement in the U.S., DSA President Joseph M. Schwartz wrote:

Harrington envisioned uniting the constituencies of the three Georges (Meany, McGovern and Wallace) and getting feminists, trade unionists and black, Latino and socialist activists in the same room talking politics. It seemed utopian, if not naïve, in 1973. But by the late 1970s, partly because of the success of the DSOC-inspired Democratic Agenda, coalition politics had become a mantra among trade unionists, activists in communities of color, feminists and the LGBTQ community.

Harrington defended his decision to build a democratic left movement by recruiting "peaceniks" over trade unionists:

[I]n their derogatory comparison of this movement with the trade unionists, my comrades failed to notice two of its historic aspects. First, the anti-war young were right: Vietnam was not only an immoral conflict, it was counterproductive from all points of view, including that of progressive anti-Communism. Secondly, the new strata of the issue-oriented and college-educated who provided the mass base for this phenomenon were, and are, extremely important to the creation of a new majority for change in this country.

=== DSOC founding convention ===
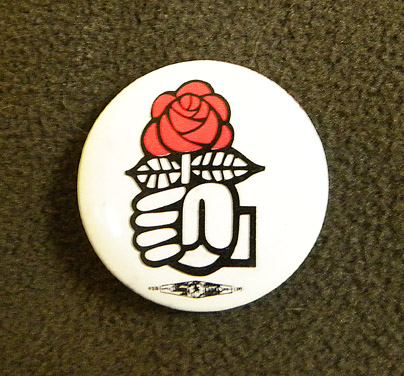
DSOC button from 1978

The June 1973 issue of Newsletter of the Democratic Left announced that a "new, nationwide socialist organization" will be launched at DSOC's founding convention on October 12, 1973 in New York City. Membership dues (which included a subscription to the Newsletter) were solicited, with rates of $3.50 for students and $7.00 for regular membership accepted until January 1, 1974.

The convention was to be a three-day affair at the Eisner and Lubin Auditorium of New York University. The convention was not composed of elected delegates, but instead was open to the public, with about 500 people in attendance. The keynote speaker chosen for the occasion was David Lewis, one of the architects of the New Democratic Party, the social-democratic parliamentary opposition party of Canada.

On the convention's second day on October 13, the proceedings moved to the McAlpin Hotel, located at the corner of Broadway and 34th Street in New York City, and began in earnest. Harrington delivered an address to the gathering. Among the statements he made at the convention were, "It is time for the democratic Left to close the books on the differences of the 1960s", and "We must go where the people are, which is the liberal wing of the Democratic Party".

The attendees next broke up into small workshops, focusing on subjects such as "unions", "feminism", "racial equality", "Democratic Party", and "equality" and "detente". The workshop chairs were appointed in advance and included Michael Walzer, Bogdan Denitch, Christopher Lasch and others. A panel discussion on "Socialism and the Welfare State" was also held, featuring Harrington's close political associate, the historian and magazine editor Irving Howe, who would become one of DSOC's prominent members.

The final day of the convention saw the election of a governing National Board and ratification of a DSOC constitution.

=== Joining the Socialist International ===
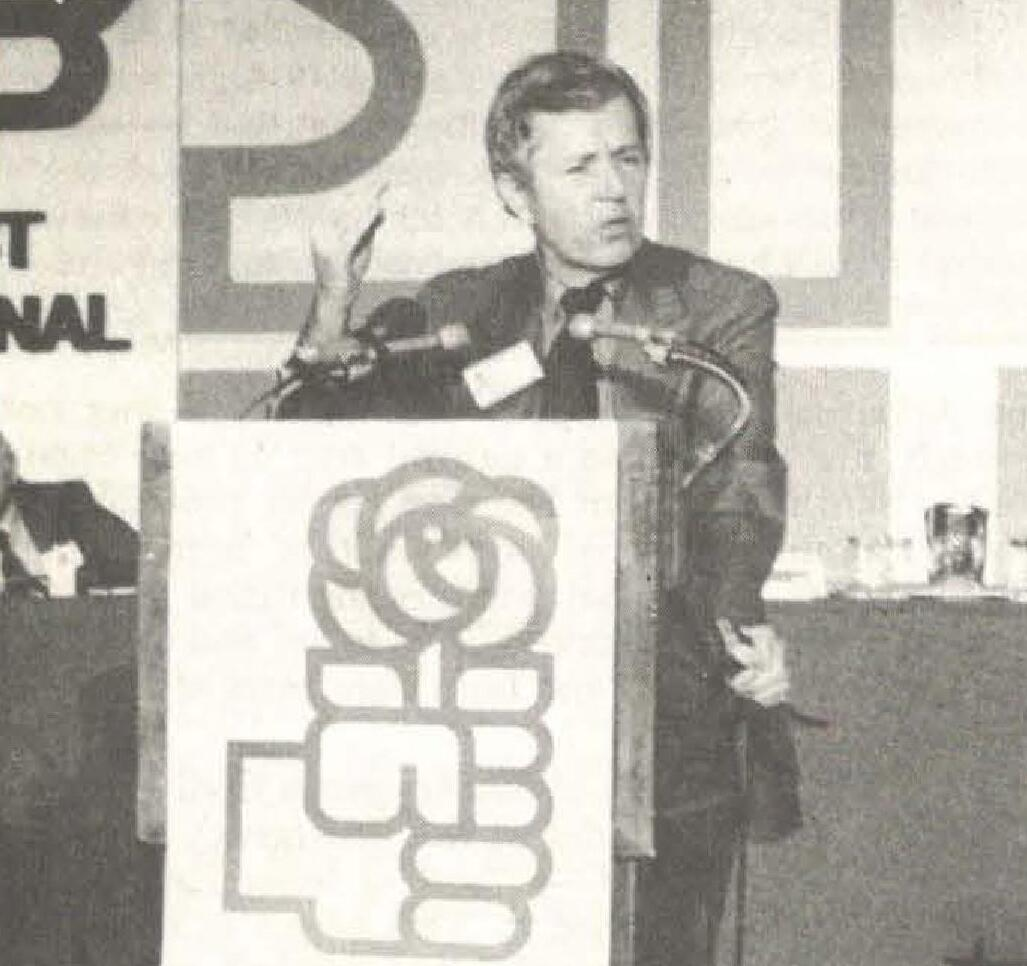
Harrington addressing the Socialist International Congress in Vancouver, 1978

In autumn of 1976, Harrington and Clark were the sole DSOC representatives to attend the Geneva Congress of the Socialist International (SI). As Harrington describes it, he lobbied privately for several days to have DSOC admitted to the SI. Near the end of the Congress, he gave a five-minute speech to the governing board on DSOC's efforts to build "a mainstream American Left". Afterwards,

David Lewis [leader of the Canadian affiliate] asked me if I would accept DSOC's admission as a consultative, rather than a full-member, party. My heart missed a beat, since that outcome was now beyond my wildest hopes. With as much calm as I could muster, and a show of conciliatory generosity, I said, yes, that would be acceptable.

Being a consultative member meant that DSOC representatives would have a voice but no vote at future SI Congresses. Then, two years later, DSOC was admitted as a full member.

=== Merger into Democratic Socialists of America ===
DSOC ceased to exist in 1982 when it merged with the New American Movement (NAM) to form the Democratic Socialists of America (DSA).

Discussions with representatives of NAM, a successor to Students for a Democratic Society (SDS), had begun as early as 1977. The merger was favored by DSOC's left-wing, led by historian Jim Chapin, which sought to bring into the Committee many former participants in the 1960s New Left who were in search of a new political home. DSOC formally endorsed the idea of merging with NAM at its 1979 Houston convention.

However, the merger proposal did generate vocal opposition. Forces on DSOC's right wing, led by Irving Howe and calling themselves the Committee Against the NAM Merger (CATNAM), urged that instead of courting New Left survivors, DSOC should emphasize outreach to larger forces in the labor movement. Besides sharing NAM's distrust of the Democratic Party, many CATNAM adherents had misgivings about NAM's position toward Israel. DSOC maintained a belief in a two-state solution that guaranteed Israel's continued existence, while NAM members tended to view the Palestine Liberation Organization (PLO) as engaged in an anti-colonial liberation struggle. Ultimately, a careful statement was worked out on the Middle East based on a two-state solution, and merger talks moved forward.

The 1981 DSOC National Convention was marked by more heated debate on the question of uniting with NAM. It was resolved by a vote of approximately 80% of the delegates in favor and none against; the other 20%, who supported the CATNAM position, abstained from voting. Harrington later noted: "Our opponents wanted to indicate they were unhappy — and that they were staying".

The Unity Convention, held in Detroit in 1982, joined NAM and DSOC, thereby establishing the DSA. The gathering was addressed by George Crockett, a member of the Congressional Black Caucus in the U.S. House of Representatives. Harrington delivered the keynote address. The DSA organization claimed a membership of 6,000 at the time of its formation, with nearly 5,000 coming from DSOC.

== Structure and composition ==
=== Membership ===
When Harrington broke away and formed DSOC, he took an estimated 200 SDUSA members with him (SDUSA claimed a total membership of about 18,000 in 1973). Counting the additional people recruited from other places, DSOC started with 840 members. The Committee's first paid staffer was Jack Clark, a 23-year-old from Boston who received $50 a month and use of a spare bed in the home of Debbie Meier, herself a second generation socialist and important figure in DSOC's inner circle. Her home served as the group's base of operations up until the October 1973 convention, at which time DSOC rented a tiny basement office.

=== Publications ===
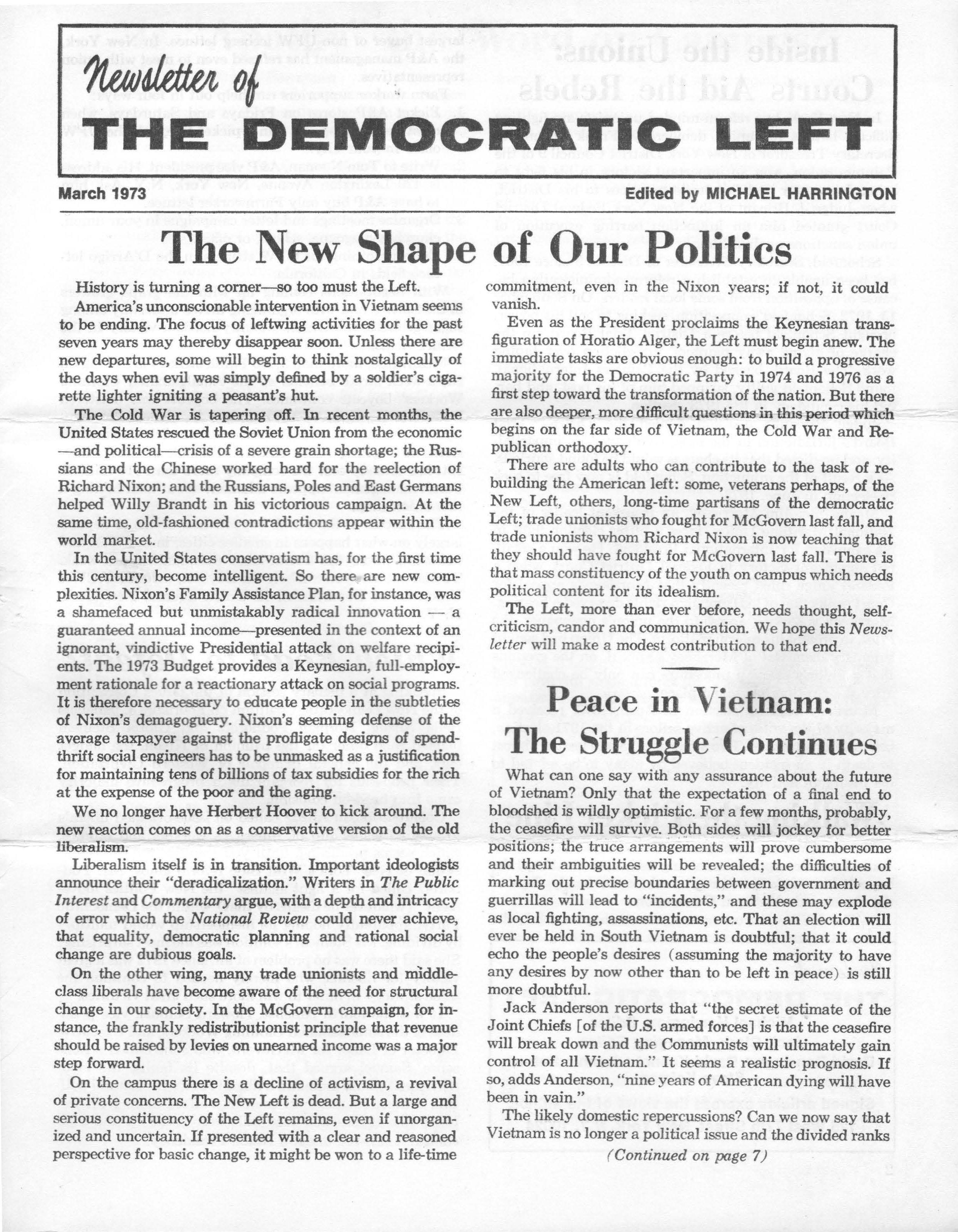
First page of Newsletter of the Democratic Left volume 1, issue 1 (March 1973)

The publication that would become the official organ of DSOC was initially an eight-page letter-sized monthly called Newsletter of the Democratic Left (the name was later shortened to Democratic Left). The first issue appeared in March 1973 under the editorship of Michael Harrington. He had prior experience working on SPA's weekly newspaper, New America, with Jack Clark as his Managing Editor. A front-page essay by Harrington in the debut issue, entitled "The New Shape of Our Politics", made nary a mention of the bitter factional fight that preceded DSOC's formation:

Liberalism is in transition. Important ideologists announce their 'deradicalization.' On the other wing, many trade unionists and middle-class liberals have become aware of the need for structural change in our society. In the McGovern campaign, for instance, the frankly redistributionist principle that revenue should be raised by levies on unearned incomes was a major step forward. On the campus there is a decline of activism, a revival of private concerns. The New Left is dead. But a large and serious constituency of the Left remains, even if unorganized and uncertain. If presented with a clear and reasoned perspective for basic change, it might be won to a lifetime commitment, even in the Nixon years; if not, it could vanish. The Left, more than ever before, needs thought, self-criticism, candor, and communication. We hope this Newsletter will make a modest contribution to that end.

Democratic Left continues today as the publication of the Democratic Socialists of America. DSOC also published a number of discussion bulletins and pamphlets, containing typewritten content submitted by its members about various issues of concern.
