= Democratic Socialist Federation =

- Founded: 1956
- Dissolved: 1972
- Split from: Socialist Party of America
- Merged into: People's Party
- Succeeded by: Democratic Socialist Organizing Committee; Social Democrats, USA
- Ideology: Social democracy
- Political position: Left-wing
- International affiliation: Socialist International

The Democratic Socialist Federation was founded by members of the Social Democratic Federation who had opposed the latter's 1956 reunification with the Socialist Party of America in 1956.

The Federation merged with the Socialist Party in March 1972. In December of that year, the Socialist Party–Social Democratic Federation voted to change its name to Social Democrats, USA.

== Convention of December 1972 ==
In its 1972 Convention, the Socialist Party had two Co-Chairmen, Bayard Rustin and Charles S. Zimmerman (of the International Ladies Garment Workers' Union, ILGWU) and a First National Vice Chairman, James S. Glaser, who were re-elected by acclamation.

The Party changed its name to "Social Democrats, USA" by a vote of 73 to 34. Changing the name of the Socialist Party to "Social Democrats USA" was intended to be "realistic." The New York Times observed that the Socialist Party had last sponsored a candidate for President in 1956, who received only 2,121 votes, which were cast in only six states. Because the Socialist Party no longer sponsored candidates in Presidential elections, continued use of the name "Party" was "misleading" and hindered the recruiting of activists who participated in the Democratic Party, according to the majority report. The name "Socialist" was replaced by "Social Democrats" because many American associated the word "socialism" with Soviet communism. Moreover, the organization sought to distinguish itself from two small Marxist parties.
