= Michael Harrington =

American socialist writer (1928–1989)

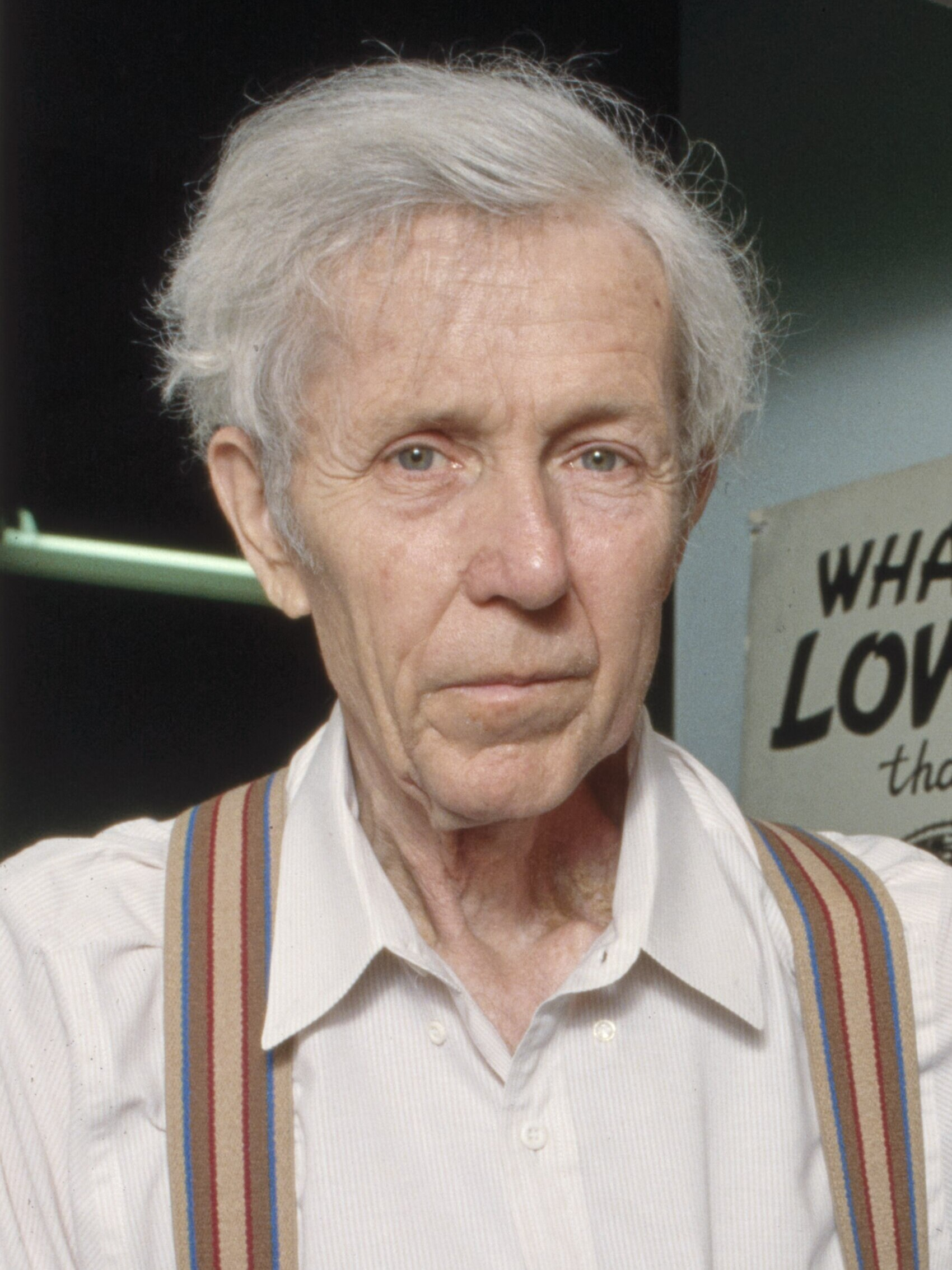
- Portrait by Bernard Gotfryd, 1988

National Co-chair of the Democratic Socialists of America
- In office March 20, 1982 – July 31, 1989
- Preceded by: Position established

National Chairman of the Socialist Party of America
- In office July 7, 1968 – October 23, 1972
- Preceded by: Darlington Hoopes
- Succeeded by: Position abolished

Personal details
- Born: Edward Michael Harrington Jr. February 24, 1928 St. Louis, Missouri, U.S.
- Died: July 31, 1989 (aged 61) Larchmont, New York, U.S.
- Party: Democratic Socialists of America (since 1982)
- Other political affiliations: ISL (1953-1958); SPA (1958-1972); DSOC (1973-1982)
- Spouse: Stephanie Gervis (m. 1963)
- Children: 2
- Education: College of the Holy Cross (BA); University of Chicago (MA); Yale University (attended)

Edward Michael Harrington Jr. (February 24, 1928 – July 31, 1989) was an American democratic socialist writer, university professor, and public political commentator. As a writer, he was best known as the author of The Other America, a best-selling book published in 1962 that was credited for helping to launch President Lyndon B. Johnson's War on Poverty in 1964.

Harrington was a founding member of the Democratic Socialists of America and its most influential early leader.

== Early life and education ==
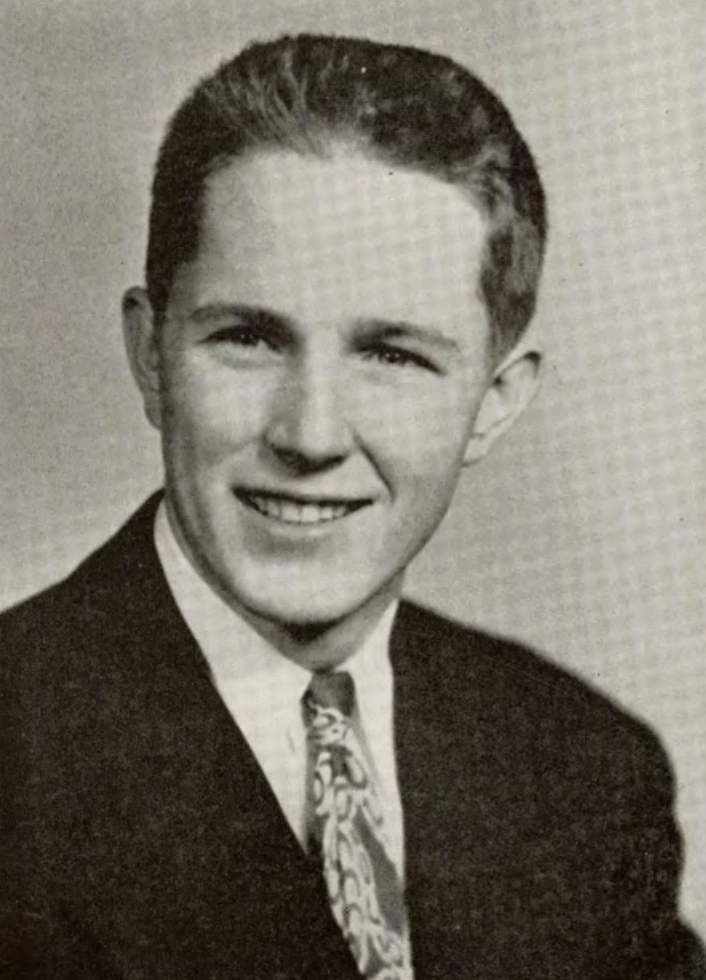
Harrington in the 1947 Holy Cross yearbook

Harrington was born in St. Louis, Missouri, on February 24, 1928, to an Irish-American family. He attended St. Roch Catholic School and St. Louis University High School, where he was a classmate (class of 1944) of Thomas Anthony Dooley III. He attended the College of the Holy Cross, where he obtained his B.A., and later graduated from the University of Chicago with an M.A. in English literature. Harrington also attended Yale Law School, dropping out after one year.

As a young man, Harrington was interested in both leftist politics and Catholicism. He joined Dorothy Day's Catholic Worker Movement, a communal movement that stressed social justice and nonviolence. Harrington enjoyed arguing about culture and politics, and his Jesuit education had made him a good debater and rhetorician.

Harrington was an editor of the newspaper Catholic Worker from 1951 to 1953, but he soon became disillusioned with religion. Although he always retained a certain affection for Catholic culture, he ultimately became an atheist.

== Career ==
Harrington's estrangement from religion was accompanied by an increasing interest in Marxism and secular socialism. After leaving The Catholic Worker, Harrington became a member of the Independent Socialist League (ISL), a small organization associated with the former Trotskyist activist Max Shachtman. Harrington and Shachtman believed that socialism, which they believed implied a just and fully democratic society, could not be realized by authoritarian communism, and were fiercely critical of the "bureaucratic collectivist" states in Eastern Europe and elsewhere.

In 1955, Harrington was placed on the FBI Index, whose master list contained more than 10 million names in 1939. From the 1950s through to the 1970s, FBI director J. Edgar Hoover added an untold number of names of U.S. activists he considered "dangerous characters", to be placed in detention camps in case of a national emergency. Later, Harrington was added to the master list of Nixon political opponents.

After Norman Thomas's Socialist Party of America absorbed Shachtman's ISL in 1957, Harrington endorsed Shachtman's strategy of working as part of the Democratic Party rather than sponsoring candidates as Socialists. Although Harrington identified personally with the socialism of Thomas and Eugene Debs, the most consistent thread running through his life and his work was a "left wing of the possible within the Democratic Party."

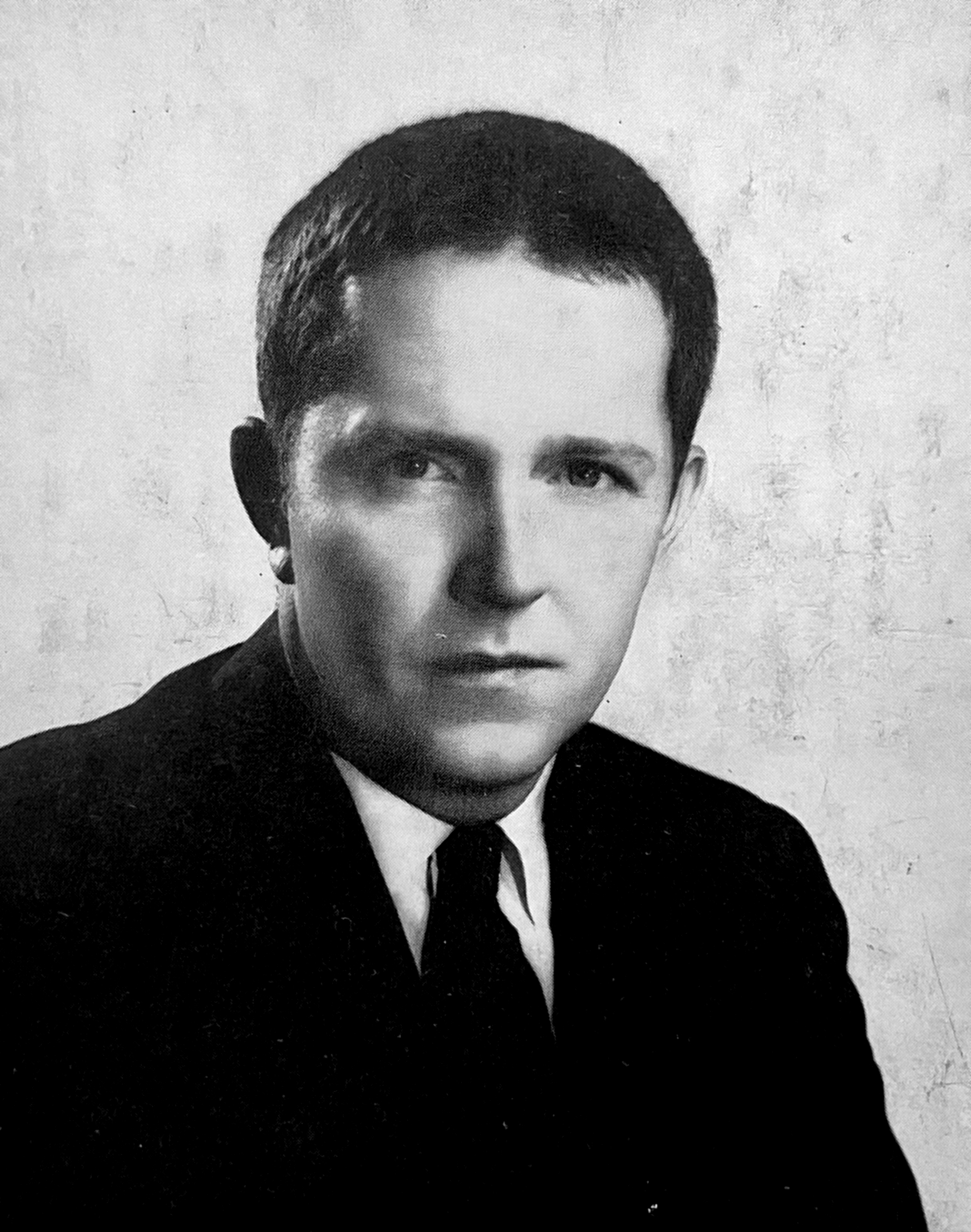
Portrait of Harrington from the first edition dust jacket of The Other America, 1962

Harrington served as the first editor of New America, the official weekly newspaper of the Socialist Party-Social Democratic Federation, founded in October 1960. In 1962, he published The Other America: Poverty in the United States, a book that has been credited with sparking John F. Kennedy's and Lyndon Johnson's War on Poverty. For The Other America, Harrington was awarded a George Polk Award and The Sidney Award. He became a widely read intellectual and political writer, in 1972 publishing a second bestseller, Socialism. His voluminous writings included 14 other books and scores of articles, published in such journals as Commonweal, Partisan Review, The New Republic, Commentary, and The Nation.

Harrington often debated classical liberals/libertarians like Milton Friedman and conservatives like William F. Buckley Jr. He also debated younger left-wing radicals.

Harrington was present in June 1962 at the founding conference of Students for a Democratic Society. In clashes with Tom Hayden and Alan Haber, he argued that their Port Huron Statement was insufficiently explicit about excluding communists from their vision of a New Left. Arthur M. Schlesinger, Sr. called Harrington the "only responsible radical" in America. Ted Kennedy said, "I see Michael Harrington as delivering the Sermon on the Mount to America," and "among veterans in the War on Poverty, no one has been a more loyal ally when the night was darkest."

In July 1968 Harrington was elected chairman (later co-chairman) of the Socialist Party, but by the early 1970s the governing faction of the Socialist Party continued to endorse a negotiated peace to end the Vietnam War, a stance that he came to believe was no longer viable. The party's continued rightward shift eventually lead him to resign from his position as co-chairman in October 1972, shortly before the party's national convention in December, where a majority of delegates at the convention voted to formally dissolve the party into the Social Democrats, USA. Harrington left, and with his former caucus, formed the Democratic Socialist Organizing Committee. A smaller faction, associated with peace activist David McReynolds, formed the Socialist Party USA.

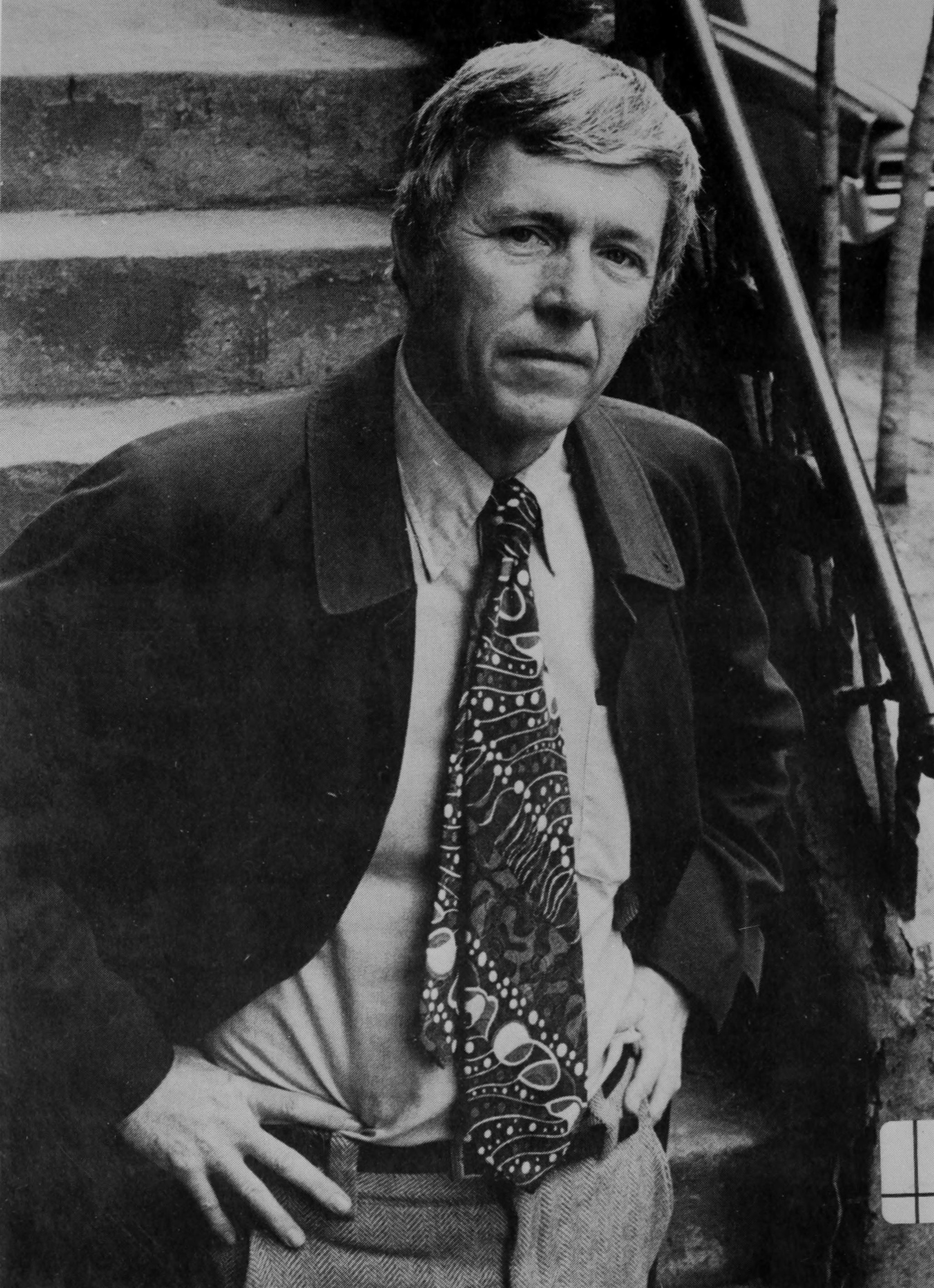
Portrait of Harrington from the first edition dust jacket of The Twilight of Capitalism, 1965

Harrington was appointed a professor of political science at Queens College in Flushing, New York City, in 1972. He wrote 16 books and was named a distinguished professor of political science in 1988. Harrington is also credited with coining the term neoconservatism in 1973.

Harrington said that socialists had to go through the Democratic Party to enact their policies, reasoning that the socialist vote had declined from a peak of approximately one million in the years around World War I to a few thousand by the 1950s. He considered running for the Democratic presidential nomination in 1980 against President Jimmy Carter, but decided against it after Senator Ted Kennedy announced his campaign. He later endorsed Kennedy and said, "if Kennedy loses or is driven out of this campaign, it will be a loss for the left". Harrington viewed Carter as overly conservative.

In 1982, the Democratic Socialist Organizing Committee merged with the New American Movement, an organization of New Left activists, forming the Democratic Socialists of America (DSA). It was the principal U.S. affiliate of the Socialist International, which includes socialist and labour parties such as the Swedish and German Social Democrats and the British Labour Party, until it voted to leave in 2017. Harrington and Barbara Ehrenreich were elected co-chairs of DSA. Harrington remained chairman of DSA from its inception to his death.

During the 1980s, Harrington contributed commentaries to National Public Radio.

== Political views ==
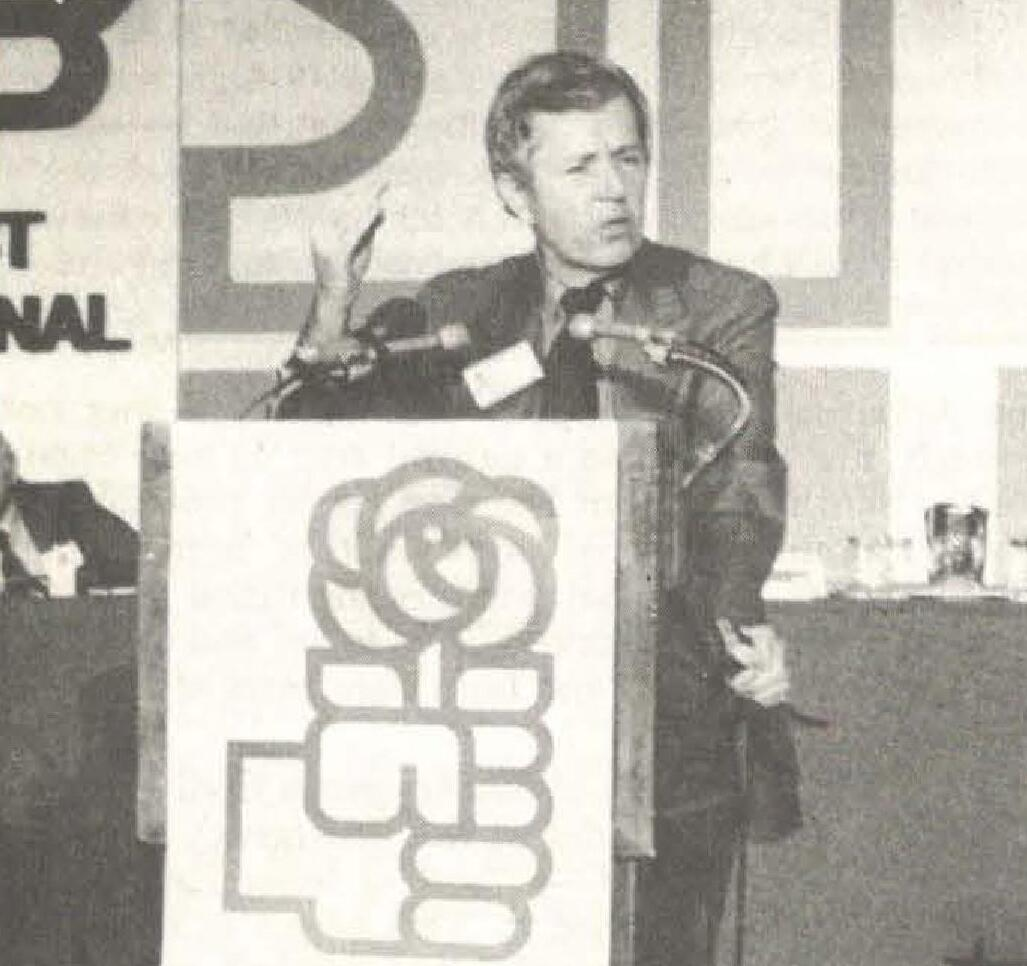
Harrington speaking at a Socialist International Congress in Vancouver, 1978

Harrington embraced a democratic interpretation of the writings of Karl Marx while rejecting the "actually existing" systems of the Soviet Union, China and the Eastern Bloc. In 1988, Harrington said:

Marx was a democrat with a small "d". [....] The Democratic Socialists envision a humane social order based on popular control of resources and production, economic planning, equitable distribution, feminism and racial equality. I share an immediate program with liberals in this country because the best liberalism leads toward socialism. [....] I want to be on the left wing of the possible.

Harrington made clear that even if the traditional Marxist vision of a marketless, stateless society were impossible, he did not understand why this had to "result in the social consequence of some people eating while others starve".

Before the Soviet Union's collapse, the DSA voiced opposition to that nation's bureaucratically managed economy and control over its satellite states. The DSA welcomed Mikhail Gorbachev's reforms in the Soviet Union. Sociologist Bogdan Denitch wrote in the DSA's Democratic Left (quoted in 1989):

The aim of democrats and socialists should be… to help the chances of successful reform in the Soviet bloc. […] While supporting liberalization and economic reforms from above, socialists should be particularly active in contacting and encouraging the tender shoots of democracy from below.

Harrington voiced admiration for German Social Democratic Chancellor Willy Brandt's Ostpolitik, which sought to reduce antagonism between Western Europe and Soviet states. A Zionist, Harrington supported Israel on socialist grounds.

== Personal life ==
From May 30, 1963, until his death, Harrington was married to Stephanie Gervis Harrington, a freelance and staff writer for The Village Voice. Gervis Harrington published articles in The New Yorker, New York Magazine, The Nation, The New York Times Magazine, Harper's, The New Republic, The Village Voice, Vogue, Cosmopolitan, Newsday and other publications. After Harrington's death, she raised their two children and continued her work as a writer. Gervis Harrington died on November 8, 2008, at age 71.

=== Religion ===
In 1978, the periodical Christian Century quoted Harrington:

I am a pious apostate, an atheist shocked by the faithlessness of the believers, a fellow traveler of moderate Catholicism who has been out of the church for 20 years.

Harrington observed of himself and his high school classmate Tom Dooley, "each of us was motivated, in part at least, by the Jesuit inspiration of our adolescence that insisted so strenuously that a man must live his philosophy."

In his 1983 Wilson Quarterly article "The Politics at God's Funeral", Harrington wrote that religion was passing into oblivion, but he worried that the passing of legitimizing religious authority made Western societies lose a basis for virtue or common values. He proposed that democratic socialism help create a moral framework to salvage the values of progressive Judaism and Christianity "but not in religious form.”

In 1988, Harrington wrote:

The politics of international economic and social solidarity must be presented as a practical solution to immediate problems as well as a recognition of that oneness of humankind celebrated in the Biblical account of the common parents of all human beings.

== Death and legacy ==
Harrington died of esophageal cancer in Larchmont, New York, on July 31, 1989. The City University of New York has established The Michael Harrington Center for Democratic Values and Social Change at Queens College in his honor.

== Media appearances ==
- Harrington was a guest speaker on the television series Free to Choose and argued against some of Milton Friedman's theories of the free market.
- In 1966 he appeared on William F. Buckley, Jr.'s television program Firing Line. He explained his opinions on poverty and debated Buckley on government attempts to address poverty and its consequences.

== Works ==
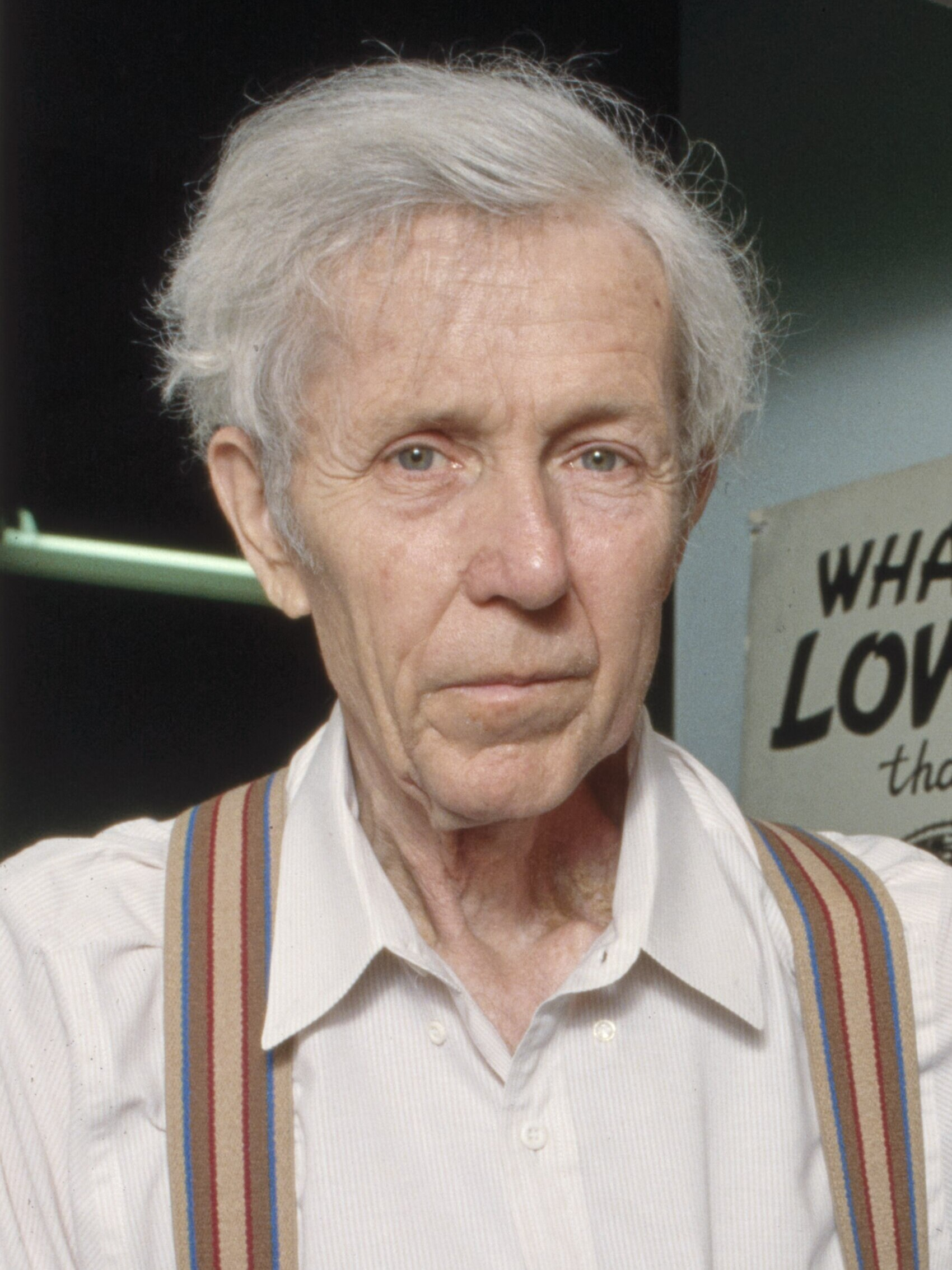
Harrington in 1988.

- The Other America: Poverty in the United States. New York: Macmillan, 1962.
- The Retail Clerks. New York: John Wiley, 1962.
- The Accidental Century. New York: Macmillan, 1965.
- "The Politics of Poverty," in Irving Howe (ed.), The Radical Papers. Garden City, NY: Doubleday & Co., 1966; pp. 122–43.
- The Social-Industrial Complex. New York: League for Industrial Democracy, 1968.
- Toward a Democratic Left: A Radical Program for a New Majority. New York: Macmillan, 1968; Baltimore: Penguin, 1969 paperback ed., with new afterword.
- Socialism. New York: Saturday Review Press. 1972. ISBN 978-0-84150141-6.
- Fragments of the Century: A Social Autobiography. New York: Saturday Review Press, 1973.
- Twilight of Capitalism. New York: Simon & Schuster, 1977.
- The Vast Majority. New York: Simon & Schuster, 1977.
- Tax Policy and the Economy: A Debate between Michael Harrington and Representative Jack Kemp, April 25, 1979., with Jack Kemp, New York: Institute for Democratic Socialism, 1979.
- James H. Cone, "The Black Church and Marxism: what do they have to say to each other", with comments by Michael Harrington, New York: Institute for Democratic Socialism, 1980.
- Decade of Decision: The Crisis of the American System. New York: Touchstone, 1981.
- The Next America: The Decline and Rise of the United States. New York: Touchstone, 1981.
- The Politics at God's Funeral: The Spiritual Crisis of Western Civilization. New York: Henry Holt, 1983.
- The New American Poverty. New York: Holt, Rinehart, Winston, 1984.
- Taking Sides: The Education of a Militant Mind. New York: Holt, Rinehart, Winston, 1985.
- The Next Left: The History of a Future. New York: Henry Holt, 1986.
- The Long Distance Runner: An Autobiography. New York: Henry Holt, 1988.
- Socialism: Past & Future, New York: Arcade Publishing, 1989

== Biography ==
- Isserman, Maurice The Other American: The Life of Michael Harrington. New York: Perseus Books 2001
- Doug Greene, A Failure of Vision: Michael Harrington and the Limits of Democratic Socialism. Winchester, UK: Zero Books, 2021.

== See also ==
- Bernt Carlsson
- Democratic Socialist Organizing Committee
- Democratic Socialists of America
- New American Movement
- Socialist Youth League (United States)
