= Socialism: Past & Future =

1992 book written by Michael Harrington

- Author: Michael Harrington
- Language: English
- Subject: Socialism, History of Socialism, Socialism of the 21st Century
- Genre: Nonfiction, Political philosophy
- Published: 1989
- Publisher: Penguin Publishing
- Publication place: United States of America
- Pages: 362

Socialism: Past and Future is a 1989 book written by Michael Harrington, with an introduction by Arthur Lipow. It is Harrington's last book before his death. He started writing it on the day he was told that his cancer was inoperable.

== Synopsis ==
Michael Harrington presents an outline of socialism in response to the growing collapse of Communist governments and presents an alternative model of socialism.
