= 2026 New York state elections =

- November 3, 2026

Elections in New York took place throughout 2026. The general election was held on November 3, 2026. A state primary election took place on June 23, 2026.

== Concerns over ICE at polling places ==
New York was one of nine states where Homeland Security Investigations planned to send agents to people's homes, starting September 2026, to ask about their citizenship and whether they had registered or voted.

A federal judge in California issued a preliminary injunction on October 21 that stops these visits in New York when the person is likely a U.S. citizen. She found that the visits probably violated the Voting Rights Act's ban on intimidating people who help others vote. The order runs through Election Day and was paused until October 23 so the government can appeal.

== Federal elections ==
No special elections to the United States Congress are scheduled to take place as of January 1, 2026.

=== U.S. House of Representatives ===
New York has twenty-six congressional districts that elect twenty-six delegates to the U.S. House of Representatives. Since the 2022 elections, most representatives have been Democratic.

== State offices ==
=== Governor and lieutenant governor ===
A law passed in May 2025 ended separate primaries for the nominee for lieutenant governor, requiring gubernatorial candidates to choose one as part of a ticket.

=== State Senate ===
All 63 seats of the New York State Senate are up for election. Democrats have retained a majority control of the Senate since 2018.

=== State Assembly ===
All 150 seats of the New York State Assembly are up for election. Democrats have retained a majority control of the assembly since 1975.

=== Special elections ===
==== New York City ====
In New York City, assemblymembers Harvey Epstein and Zohran Mamdani, as well as state senator Brad Hoylman-Sigal, resigned to take various offices. The elections to replace all three took place on February 3, 2026.

2026 New York State Assembly special election, District 74
Party	Candidate	Votes	%
Democratic	Keith Powers	3,953	82.13
Republican	Joseph Foley	687	14.27
Conservative	Joseph Foley	117	2.43
Total	Joseph Foley	804	16.70
Write-in		49	1.02
Total votes		4,813	100

2026 New York State Assembly special election, District 36
Party	Candidate	Votes	%
Democratic	Diana Moreno	3,148	38.06%
Working Families	Diana Moreno	2,962	35.81%
Total	Diana Moreno	6,110	73.86%
Queens For All	Rana Abdelhamid	1,414	17.09%
People First	Mary Jobaida	647	7.82%
Write-in		101	1.22%
Total votes		8,272	100%
Democratic hold			

New York State Senate special election, District 47
Party	Candidate	Votes	%
Democratic	Erik Bottcher	11,076	76.10
Working Families	Erik Bottcher	2,249	15.45
Total	Erik Bottcher	13,325	91.56
Republican	Charlotte Friedman	1,117	7.67
Write-in		112	0.77
Total votes		14,554	

With Bottcher winning the special election, a further one for his third city council district will take place. This will be non-partisan, involve ranked-choice voting, and the winner will only serve until the end of the year. This will be followed by a primary and a general on the dates allotted for normal elections to fill out the final three years of the term.

==== Rest of the state ====
Sean Ryan resigned his seat in the state senate on December 31, 2025, to take office as mayor of Buffalo.

Governor Hochul announced the date of the special election for February 3, along with three other legislative seats.

2/3/2026 New York State Senate special election, District 61
Party	Candidate	Votes	%
Democratic	Jeremy Zellner	18,752	59.46
Republican	Dan Gagliardo	9,630	30.54
Conservative	Dan Gagliardo	2,961	9.39
Total	Dan Gagliardo	12,591	39.93
Write-in		164	0.52
Total votes		31,536	100

Elections in Erie County, New York had three municipalities include ballot measures as part of their general elections. In particular, the city of Buffalo included eleven ballot measures concerning government offices, policing and human rights. The proposals included amendments to the City Charter regarding mayoral succession, budget procedures, and the creation of a Civilian Police Advisory Commission and a Commission on Human Rights.

== Municipal elections ==
Per the "Even Year Law," most local elections across New York will be held on November 3, 2026.
