= Electoral history of Zohran Mamdani =

Elections featuring Mayor of New York City

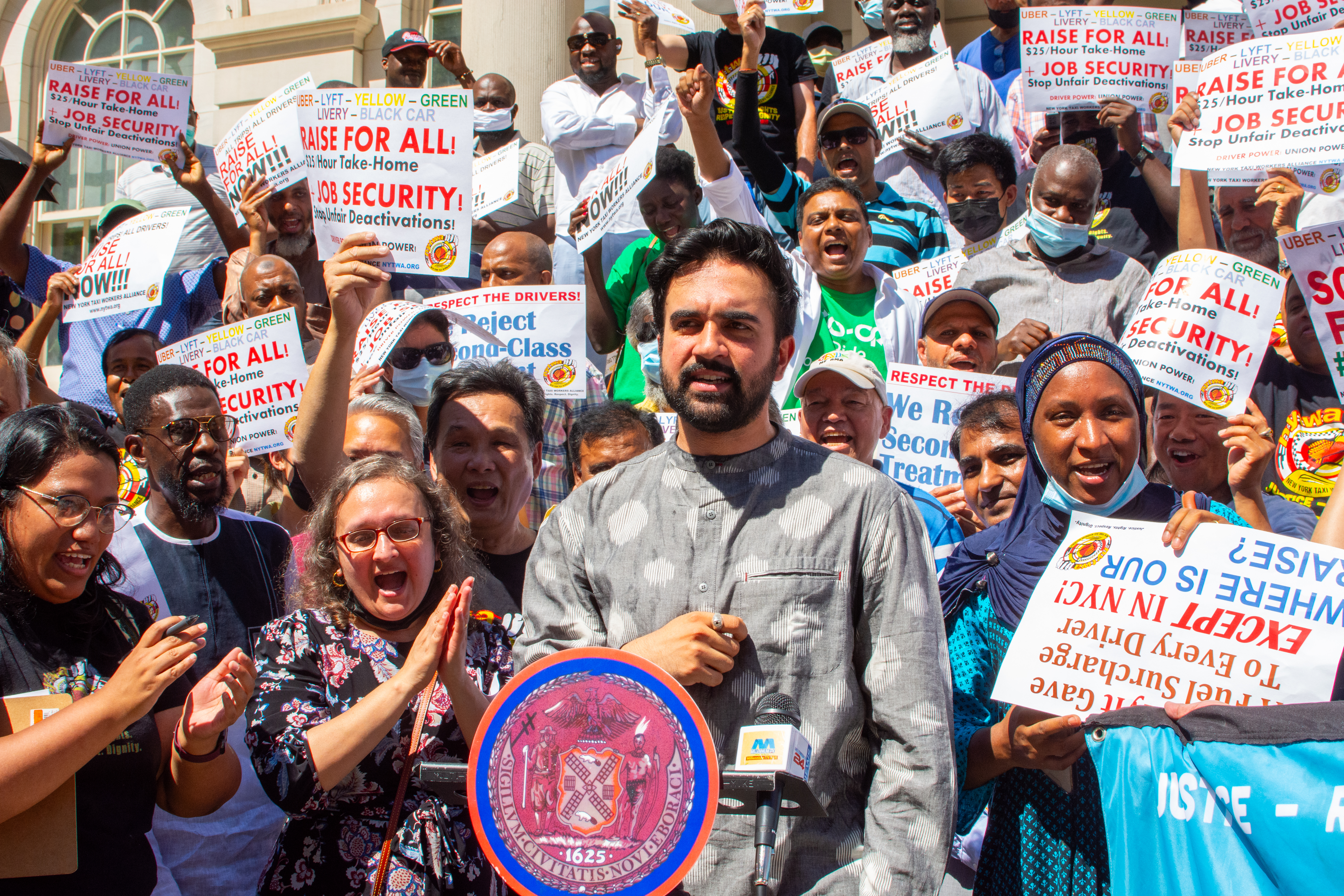
Zohran Mamdani in front of the New York City Hall for Taxi Workers Alliance rally in 2022.

Zohran Mamdani is the mayor of New York City and assumed office on January 1, 2026. A member of the Democratic Party and the Democratic Socialists of America, he has served as a member of the New York State Assembly from the 36th district from 2021 to 2025, representing the Queens neighborhood of Astoria.

== New York State Assembly elections (2020–2024) ==
=== 2020 ===
2020 New York State Assembly 36th district election
Primary election
Party	Candidate	Votes	%
Democratic	Zohran Mamdani	8,410	51.20%
Democratic	Aravella Simotas (incumbent)	7,986	48.62%
Write-in		30	0.18%
Total votes		16,426	100.00%
	Blank/Spoiled	976	
General election
Democratic	Zohran Mamdani	38,221	98.46%
Write-in		596	1.54%
Total votes		38,817	100.00%
	Blank/Spoiled	11,957	

=== 2022 ===
2022 New York State Assembly 36th district election
Party	Candidate	Votes	%
Democratic	Zohran Mamdani (incumbent)	18,636	76.29%
Working Families	Zohran Mamdani (incumbent)	5,454	22.33%
Total	Zohran Mamdani (incumbent)	24,090	98.62%
Write-in		338	1.38%
Total votes		24,428	100.00%
	Blank/Spoiled	6,038	

=== 2024 ===
2024 New York State Assembly 36th district election
Party	Candidate	Votes	%
Democratic	Zohran Mamdani (incumbent)	30,161	78.33%
Working Families	Zohran Mamdani (incumbent)	7,750	20.13%
Total	Zohran Mamdani (incumbent)	37,911	98.45%
Write-in		596	1.55%
Total votes		38,507	100.00%
	Blank/Spoiled	10,804	

== 2025 New York City mayoral election ==
=== Mayoral primary ===
2025 New York City Democratic mayoral primary
Candidate	Round 1		Round 2		Round 3	
Candidate	Votes	%	Votes	%	Votes	%
Zohran Mamdani	469,642	43.82%	469,755	43.86%	573,169	56.39%
Andrew Cuomo	387,137	36.12%	387,377	36.17%	443,229	43.61%
Brad Lander	120,634	11.26%	120,707	11.27%	Eliminated	
Adrienne Adams	44,192	4.12%	44,359	4.14%	Eliminated	
Scott Stringer	17,820	1.66%	17,894	1.67%	Eliminated	
Zellnor Myrie	10,593	0.99%	10,648	0.99%	Eliminated	
Whitney Tilson	8,443	0.79%	8,525	0.80%	Eliminated	
Michael Blake	4,366	0.41%	4,389	0.41%	Eliminated	
Jessica Ramos	4,273	0.40%	4,294	0.40%	Eliminated	
Paperboy Prince	1,560	0.15%	1,628	0.15%	Eliminated	
Selma Bartholomew	1,489	0.14%	1,505	0.14%	Eliminated	
Write-ins	1,581	0.15%	Eliminated			
Active votes	1,071,730	100.00%	1,071,081	99.94%	1,016,398	94.84%
Exhausted ballots	—N/a		649	0.06%	55,332	5.16%
Source: New York City Board of Elections

=== General election ===
2025 New York City mayoral election
Party	Candidate	Votes	%	±%
Democratic	Zohran Mamdani	944,950	43.07%	−22.12%
Working Families	Zohran Mamdani	169,234	7.71%	N/A
Total	Zohran Mamdani	1,114,184	50.78%	−16.21%
Fight and Deliver	Andrew Cuomo	906,614	41.32%	N/A
Republican	Curtis Sliwa	143,305	6.53%	−20.37%
Protect Animals	Curtis Sliwa	10,444	0.48%	N/A
Total	Curtis Sliwa	153,749	7.01%	−19.89%
Safe&Affordable/EndAntiSemitism	Eric Adams (incumbent) (withdrawn)	6,897	0.31%	N/A
Conservative	Irene Estrada	2,856	0.13%	−0.99%
Integrity	Jim Walden (withdrawn)	2,319	0.11%	N/A
Quality of Life	Joseph Hernandez	1,379	0.06%	N/A
Write-in		6,206	0.28%	−0.34%
Total votes		2,194,204	100%	
Democratic hold				
