= William Cullen Bryant High School =

Public school in New York City

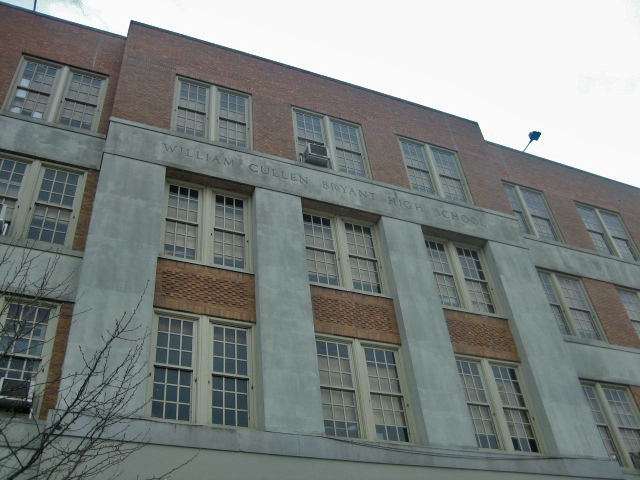

Location
- 48-10 31st Avenue; Astoria, New York 11103; United States; 40°45′28″N 73°54′38″W

Information
- Type: Public
- Established: 1889
- School district: NYC Geographic District 30
- Principal: Carlyn St. Aubain
- Teaching staff: 150.89 (FTE)
- Grades: 9–12
- Enrollment: 1,971 (2022-2023)
- Student to teacher ratio: 13.06
- Website: https://www.wcbhs.org/

William Cullen Bryant High School (WCBHS) is a secondary school in Queens, New York City, United States serving grades 9 through 12.

== Name ==
The school is named in honor of William Cullen Bryant, an American romantic poet, journalist, and long-time editor of the New York Evening Post. He is most known for his work as one of the creators of Central Park in Manhattan, New York.

== Statistics ==
As of 2021, The school has 2,141 students enrolled; the ethnic make-up of the school is 54% Hispanic, 25% Asian, 14% white, and 7% black. The school has a four-year graduation rate of 87%. and an attendance rate of 84%. In 2017, New York City Department of Education gave it an in-general school rating of Proficient.

== History ==
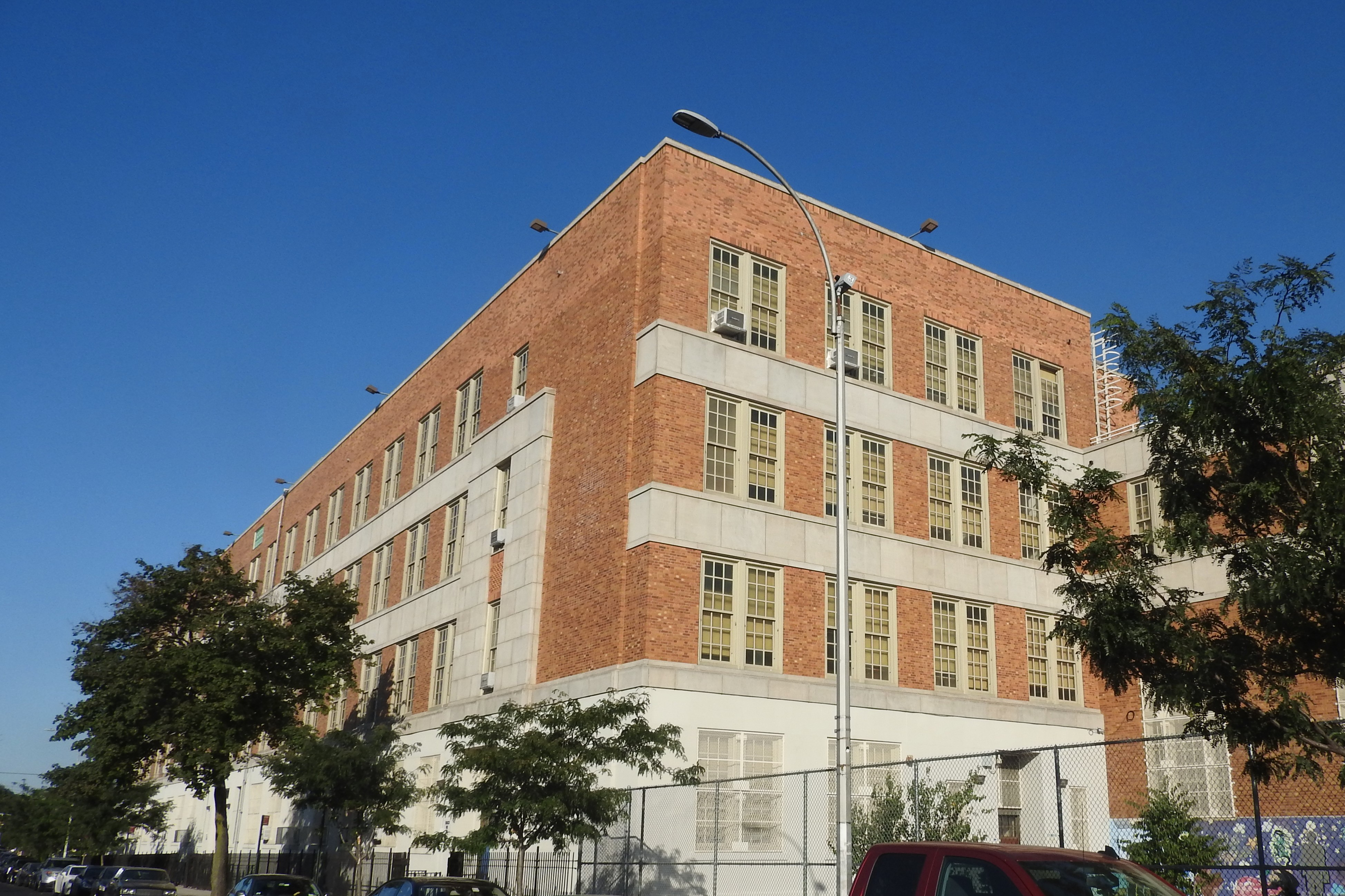
Bryant High School in 2019.

The school was founded in 1889. A new building was built between 1902 and 1904 in the Dutch Kills section of Long Island City on Wilbur Avenue (now called 41st Avenue). John T. Woodruff was awarded a $169,874 contract (equivalent to $6,320,000 in 2025) to build the school. It was a four-story brick building with a capacity of 1,455 students. The new building opened on September 12, 1904.

Bryant moved to its current site on 31st Ave in 1939, and the former building became Long Island City High School.

== In popular culture ==
- The School Song of William Cullen Bryant High School
- William Cullen Bryant was the school in the popular film A Bronx Tale. Robert De Niro visited the school.
- Two episodes of the hit TV show Ugly Betty were shot in the school. One was shot in the lunch room. The episode featured Lindsay Lohan who visited the school. The episode was called "Granny Pants".
- In episode 13 of season one of Archie Bunker's Place titled "Man of the Year" Archie Bunker says he graduated from the school in 1940.

== Notable alumni ==
- Herb Abrams (1955-1996), founder of the Universal Wrestling Federation
- Susan Anspach (1942–2018), American stage and film actress
- Panayiota Bertzikis (Class of 1999), executive director and founder of the Military Rape Crisis Center
- Fernando Caldeiro (1958–2009), astronaut
- Eugenie Clark (1922–2015), ichthyologist known for both her research on shark behavior and her study of fish in the order Tetraodontiformes.
- Eleanor Clift (1940- ), journalist.
- Florence Finney (1903–1994), first woman to serve as president pro tempore of the Connecticut State Senate.
- Veronica Gedeon (1917–1937), Long Island City native, commercial model, 1937 New York City murder victim
- Irv Gotti, (1970–2025), DJ, record executive, founder of Murder Inc. Records
- David Horowitz, biographer and conservative intellectual.
- Joel Klein (1946– ), New York City Department of Education chancellor from 2002 to 2011
- Richard Kline (1944– ), played Larry Dallas on classic ABC-TV sitcom Three's Company. He also performed on Broadway in City of Angels and is a member of the Lincoln Center Repertory Company.
- Winifred Lenihan (1898–1964), stage actress and director who played Joan of Arc in George Bernard Shaw's play Saint Joan on its debut in 1923
- Billy Loes (1929–2010), former Major League baseball pitcher who played in the World Series, winning for the Brooklyn Dodgers in 1955, was born in the area and attended Bryant High School. He also played for the Baltimore Orioles and the San Francisco Giants.
- Lou Lumenick (1949– ), New York Post metropolitan editor and film critic.
- Ollie Mack, retired NBA player
- Mike Maloy, basketball player
- Sam Mele (1922–2017), Major League Baseball player and manager
- Ethel Merman (1908–1984), star of musical comedies on Broadway and in Hollywood, was born in Astoria and graduated from Bryant. The school's auditorium was named the Ethel Merman Theater in 1989 during its centennial celebration.
- Suze Rotolo (1943–2011), an American artist, book artist, author, but best known as Bob Dylan's girlfriend between 1961 and 1964. She is the woman walking with him on the cover of his album The Freewheelin' Bob Dylan.
- Aravella Simotas (1978– ), former New York assembleymember from the 36th district.
- Moe Spahn (1912–1991), basketball player
- Fred Van Dusen (1937-2018), Major League Baseball player for Philadelphia Phillies
