= Rama Duwaji =

American artist, First Lady of New York City since 2026

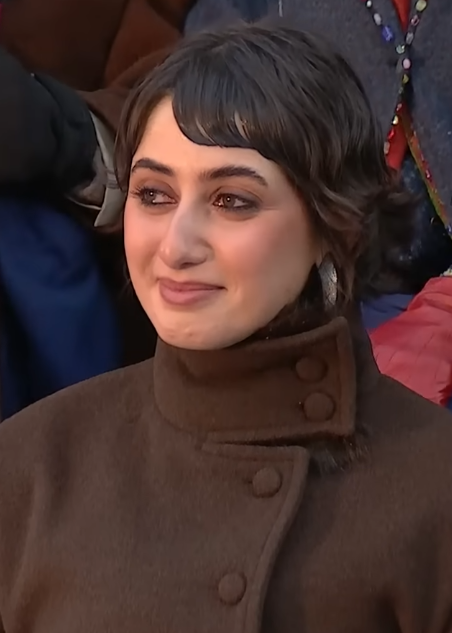
- Duwaji at her husband's inauguration in January 2026

First Lady of New York City
- Current
- Assumed role January 1, 2026
- Mayor: Zohran Mamdani
- Preceded by: Tracey Collins (de facto)

Personal details
- Born: Rama Sawaf Duwaji; June 30, 1997 (age 29) Houston, Texas, U.S.
- Spouse: Zohran Mamdani (m. 2025)
- Relatives: Mahmood Mamdani (father-in-law); Mira Nair (mother-in-law)
- Education: Virginia Commonwealth University (BFA); School of Visual Arts (MFA)
- Occupation: Animator; illustrator; ceramist
- Website: ramaduwaji.com

Rama Sawaf Duwaji (Note: Arabic: رَامَا صَوَاف دُوَجِي, romanized: Rāmā Ṣawāf Duwajī.) (born June 30, 1997) is an American animator, illustrator, and ceramist. As the wife of Mayor Zohran Mamdani, she has been the first lady of New York City since January 2026.

== Early life and education ==
Rama Sawaf Duwaji was born on June 30, 1997 in Houston, Texas, to Syrian Muslim parents from Damascus. Her father, Marwan Duwaji, is a software developer, and her mother, Bariah Dardari, is a pediatrician who also worked on humanitarian missions in war zones with the Syrian American Medical Society; the couple had married shortly before her birth. In 2006, following Dardari's appointment at the local American Hospital, the family left their home in Wayne, New Jersey, and moved to Dubai, United Arab Emirates, and Duwaji spent the remainder of her childhood in the Arab states of the Persian Gulf.

Duwaji has described drawing as her solace, and she would often get in trouble for doodling in her textbooks and notebooks at school. Her parents were supportive of her love of art, but encouraged her to be practical with her career choices. After graduating from high school, Duwaji studied communication arts at the Virginia Commonwealth University School of the Arts. She first attended classes at the school's satellite campus in Doha, Qatar, during her freshman year, then transferred to its main campus in Richmond, Virginia, where she obtained a Bachelor of Fine Arts cum laude in 2019.

In 2021, Duwaji moved to New York City to study illustration as a visual essay at the School of Visual Arts. There, she earned a Master of Fine Arts in 2024, with a graduate thesis focused on making and sharing dishes as a communal act.

== Career ==
Following her undergraduate studies, Duwaji participated in various artist residencies, including in Beirut, Paris, and New York's Catskill Mountains.

Duwaji's illustrations often explore Arab culture and focus on social justice in the Middle East, particularly women's rights, but also depict scenes of daily life in those countries. She told YUNG magazine, "I used to want my work to move everyone. Now I just want it to move someone – the people who need it." Her work has been published in The New York Times and The Washington Post, as well as British outlets and venues like the BBC and Tate Modern, and she has collaborated with Spotify and Apple.

Since 2023, Duwaji has created numerous works about the Gaza genocide and the Israel–Hezbollah conflict, as well as artwork supporting the victims of the Sudanese civil war.

In early July 2026, Duwaji was an artist-in-residence leading creative workshops at Islamic spiritual retreats organized by The Women Sanctuary, a women's organization, in Mallorca, Spain, and Corsica, France; this was met with controversy as she missed the celebrations for the United States Semiquincentennial. Later that year, she created promotional artwork for the opening of the 2026 London Literature Festival at the Southbank Centre in partnership with Dua Lipa, curator of that year's festival, and her Service95 Book Club.

== Personal life ==
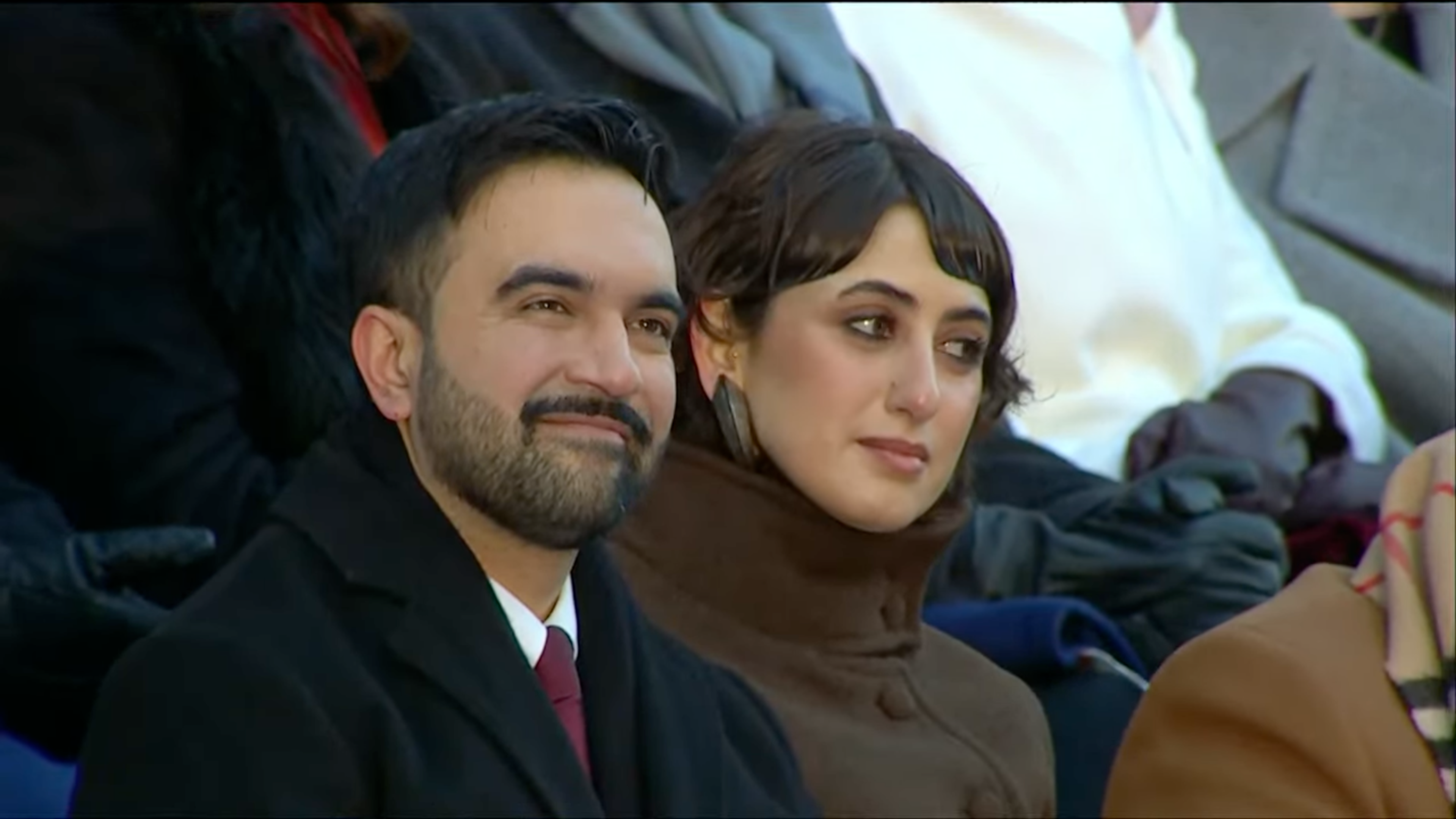
Duwaji and her husband at his mayoral inauguration

Duwaji met Zohran Mamdani – the son of academic Mahmood Mamdani and filmmaker Mira Nair – on the dating app Hinge in 2021, when he was a member of the New York State Assembly. They were engaged in October 2024, held a private nikah ceremony two months later in Dubai, and married in February 2025 in a civil ceremony at New York City Hall; they also had a ceremony in Uganda – Mamdani's birth country – in July 2025.

The couple resided in Mamdani's legislative district of Astoria, Queens, near Steinway Street, until they moved into Gracie Mansion on January 12, 2026, after taking office.

== First Lady of New York City (2026–present) ==
Following Mamdani's victory in the 2025 mayoral election, and his subsequent inauguration as mayor, Duwaji became the first lady of New York City in January 2026, making her the first Gen Z-er and the first Muslim to assume the role. She helped curate visuals for his campaign.

=== Social media and art controversy ===
In March 2026, media outlets reported that, since the October 7 attacks, Duwaji had "liked" several Instagram posts supportive of Palestinian political violence and the Palestinian cause as a whole, which caused controversy due to her husband Zohran Mamdani's public position as New York City mayor. Mamdani commented that she is a private person who has held no formal role in his campaign or administration, and noted that the posts were "liked" before the couple married in early 2025 and before he launched his mayoral campaign in October 2024. Duwaji faced additional criticism for illustrating a work by a Gazan resident in a collection of stories compiled by Palestinian writer, author and activist Susan Abulhawa, who has made controversial statements deemed by some incendiary or outright racist regarding Jews and Israelis. In a press conference, Mamdani distanced himself from Abulhawa's words, which he qualified as "reprehensible", but, when asked about his wife's social media activity, he said that she is a "private person".

Around the same time, a report by the conservative outlet The Washington Free Beacon found that, during the 2013–17 period, Duwaji had posted on her social media content celebratory of Palestinian political violence, including support for PFLP members Leila Khaled and Shadia Abu Ghazaleh. The report highlighted her usage of racial slurs and statements such as "Fuck Tel Aviv." Other outlets also found her to have used the word "gay" in a derogatory manner. The following month, in an interview with Hyperallergic, she mentioned having felt "shame" over the "harmful" language she used online as a teenager.

== Notes ==
Honorary titles
Preceded by Tracey Collins; De facto	First Lady of New York City; 2026–present	Current
