= 2026 Erie County, New York ballot measures =

The 2026 New York state elections in Erie County, New York included ballot measures in three municipalities. Ballots in the city of Buffalo and the towns of Cheektowaga and Amherst all contained proposals for their respective municipalities. All contests occurred on November 3, 2026, alongside other elections.

== City of Buffalo ==
Buffalo's election featured eleven ballot measures, all of which passed. Many of these measures had to do with mayoral succession because of the current city charter's lack of detail on how to handle mayoral succession. This lack of detail was made apparent when Christopher Scanlon stepped in as acting mayor after the resignation of former mayor Byron Brown. The proposals included amendments to the City Charter regarding mayoral succession, budget procedures, and the creation of a Civilian Police Advisory Commission and a Commission on Human Rights.

=== Measures on the ballot ===
No.	Title	Status
1	City of Buffalo Charter Amendment regarding Acting Public Officials	Passed
2	City of Buffalo Charter Amendment to require Charter Revision Commissions Every Ten Years	Passed
3	City of Buffalo Charter Amendment empowering Council to fill vacancy if Council President becomes Acting Mayor	Passed
4	City of Buffalo Charter Amendment to Limit Holdover Terms and to Review Inactive Boards	Passed
5	City of Buffalo Charter Amendment regarding Mayoral Succession	Passed
6	City of Buffalo Charter Amendment to require public website about City boards and board training	Passed
7	City of Buffalo Charter Amendment for creation of temporary task forces	Passed
8	City of Buffalo Charter Amendment on Budget Adoption Procedures	Passed
9	City of Buffalo Charter Amendment to create an Election Reforms Task Force	Passed
10	City of Buffalo Charter Amendment to Create a Civilian Police Advisory Commission	Passed
11	City of Buffalo Charter Amendment to create a Commission on Human Rights	Passed

==== Proposal 1: Acting public officials ====
Amends the City Charter, clarifying that any reference to the Mayor, Comptroller, Councilmember, Council President or Council president pro tempore includes any person holding such office in an acting capacity.

- A "YES" Vote will add a section to the City Charter clarifying that officials in an acting capacity have all of the powers of the permanent office.
- A "NO" vote will leave the City Charter unchanged.

Abstract: Currently the Buffalo City Charter provides for filling vacancies in certain public offices on an acting basis. This local law makes it clear that a person assuming the specific offices of Mayor, Council Member, Comptroller, Common Council President or Common Council President pro tempore on an acting basis has all of the powers and duties of the permanent position while in an acting capacity.

==== Proposal 2: Decennial Charter Revision Commissions ====
Amends the City of Buffalo Charter to require the establishment of a Charter Revision Commission at least once every ten years.

- A "YES" vote will mandate a City of Buffalo Charter Revision Commission at least every ten years.
- A "NO" vote will not mandate a Charter Revision Commission every ten years.

Abstract: The City of Buffalo Charter has only been reviewed by a Charter Revision Commission twice since 1999. This Amendment to the City Charter would require the Common Council to establish a commission to formally review the Charter every ten years.

==== Proposal 3: Filling the Council President's district seat ====
Amends City Charter to empower the Common Council to temporarily fill the district seat of the Common Council President if that person becomes Acting Mayor.

- A "YES" vote will allow the Common Council to temporarily fill the district seat of a Common Council President who becomes Acting Mayor.
- A "NO" vote will leave the district seat of a Common Council President who becomes Acting Mayor vacant.

Abstract: When Mayor Byron Brown resigned before the end of his term in 2024 it created a vacancy that would not be filled permanently until the 2025 general election. It was not clear what happens when the Common Council President temporarily assumes the powers and duties of the Mayor if the Mayor leaves office before the end of their term. As the Common Council President is also a district councilmember and a person can't be both Mayor and Councilmember, the South District was left without a representative for over a year. This Charter amendment would allow the Common Council to fill such a district seat on a temporary basis.

==== Proposal 4: Holdover terms and inactive boards ====
Amends the City Charter to limit members of City boards from serving past the expiration of their terms and requires the Common Council to review boards that have been inactive.

- A "YES" vote will limit members of City boards from serving more than sixty days after their terms expire and will require the Common Council to review the status of inactive City Boards.
- A "NO" vote will maintain the current situation where members of many city boards serve long after the expiration or their terms and dormant City boards remain in existence for years after they are no longer active.

Abstract: Currently many boards, commissions and other public bodies that are in the City Charter remain in existence on paper even though they have not met in years, and many members of City boards have never been reappointed or replaced even though their term expired. This Charter amendment would suspend these dormant boards until the Common Council reviews the need for them and would limit the holdover status of board members to sixty days.

==== Proposal 5: Mayoral succession ====
Amends the Charter clarifying that in the event the office of Mayor becomes vacant, the Common Council President becomes Acting Mayor.

- A "YES" Vote will amend section 4-5 of the City Charter to clarify that if the office of Mayor becomes vacant the Common Council President becomes Acting Mayor.
- A "NO" vote will leave the City Charter unchanged.

Abstract: When Mayor Brown left office before the end of his term, it was not clear if the Common Council President became Acting Mayor or just assumed the powers and duties of the office. This amendment would clarify that the Council President becomes Acting Mayor and that the district seat becomes temporarily vacant and can be filled by the Common Council.

==== Proposal 6: Board website and training ====
Amends City Charter to require a website providing information about City boards, including an application to fill vacancies, and requires training and orientation for new board members.

- A "YES" vote will mandate that the city establish such a website and training.
- A "NO" vote will not mandate such a website and training.

Abstract: Currently there is no requirement that the City maintain a publicly accessible website for information about the numerous boards, commissions, committees and other public bodies that conduct many elements of City business. While there is some information regarding some of these bodies on a City website, much of this information is not kept up to date or is just missing, Also, there is no formal way for members of the public body to know about opportunities items to serve on these bodies or for persons appointed to these boards to get orientation or training to serve on such bodies. This local law will mandate that the City maintain a website to provide this information to the public and to provide orientation and training to persons appointed to such boards.

==== Proposal 7: Temporary task forces ====
Amends Buffalo City Charter to empower the Mayor and the Common Council to appoint temporary task forces for terms not exceeding two years.

- A "YES" vote will give these powers to the Mayor and Common Council.
- A "NO" vote will not give them this power.

Abstract: The Mayor and the Common Council will be able to appoint temporary task forces to advise them on matters pertaining to the administration, safety or welfare of the City of Buffalo.

==== Proposal 8: Budget adoption procedures ====
Amends Charter to give additional powers to the Comptroller to recommend revenue and expenditure estimates in the Mayor's proposed annual budget and for Common Council to implement those recommendations.

- A "YES" vote would add these powers.
- A "NO" vote would leave the current powers unchanged.

Abstract: Currently the City Comptroller has limited time and power to review and make recommendations on the Mayor's tentative budget once it is submitted to the Common Council, and the Comon Council has no power to adjust revenue or expenditure estimates. This Charter amendment would require the Mayor to provide the proposed tentative budget to the Comptroller before submission to the Common Council. If the Comptroller recommends changes to the Mayor's revenue or expenditure estimates, the Common Council will be able to adjust those numbers downward by a two-thirds vote and any expenditure estimate upward by a majority vote.

==== Proposal 9: Election Reforms Task Force ====
Amends City Charter to establish a task force to study and make recommendations on election reforms in the City of Buffalo.

- A "YES" vote would establish an Election Reforms Task Force.
- A "NO" vote would not establish an Election Reforms Task Force.

Abstract: The City of Buffalo Charter Revision Commission established in 2025 discussed several proposals to change how primary and general elections for the offices of Mayor, Comptroller, Councilmembers and City Court Judges could be conducted, including the use of ranked choice voting and open primaries. This local law would establish a task force to study and examine these issues and make recommendations for submitting local law proposals on these issues at the City of Buffalo November 2028 general election.

==== Proposal 10: Civilian Police Advisory Commission ====
Amends City Charter to create Civilian Police Advisory Commission.

- A "YES" vote will create a City of Buffalo Civilian Police Advisory Commission.
- A "NO" vote will not create a City of Buffalo Civilian Police Advisory Commission.

Abstract: Effective February 1, 2027, a Civilian Police Advisory Commission made up of city residents, would be created in order to advise the various City of Buffalo departments on issues pertaining to Buffalo policing policies with the goal of increasing transparency and reporting, and improving resident-police relations.

==== Proposal 11: Commission on Human Rights ====
Amends City Charter to establish a Commission on Human Rights to ensure respect, protection, promotion, and enjoyment of human rights for all residents of the City of Buffalo.

- A "YES" vote would establish a Commission on Human Rights.
- A "NO" vote would not establish a Commission on Human Rights.

Abstract: This City Charter provision would establish an empowered Commission on Human Rights thereby replacing the current Commission on Citizen's Rights and Community Relations. The new Commission on Human Rights would be granted expanded powers including making recommendations to the Mayor, Common Council, City Departments, and wider community regarding legislation and other appropriate measures to further human rights protection of residents in the City of Buffalo.

== See also ==
- 2026 United States ballot measures
