= Rana Abdelhamid =

American community organizer

- رنا عبد الحميد
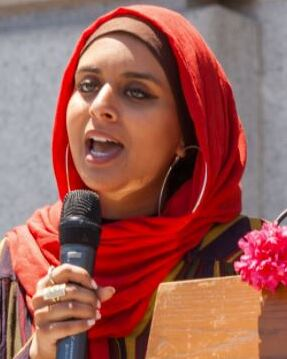
- Abdelhamid in 2018
- Born: May 6, 1993 (age 33); Queens, New York, U.S.
- Education: Middlebury College (BA); Harvard University (MPP)
- Political party: Democratic
- Website: Campaign website

Rana Abdelhamid (Arabic: رنا عبد الحميد; born May 6, 1993) is an American political candidate and activist based in Queens, New York. Abdelhamid is also the founder of Hijabis of New York and Malikah.

== Early life and education ==
Abdelhamid is of Egyptian descent and grew up in Astoria, Queens, with three siblings. As a child, she studied karate. She holds a black belt in Shotokan karate and as a student taught young girls karate to combat race-based violence.

Abdelhamid attended Middlebury College as a Posse Foundation Scholar, where she earned a B.A. in international politics and economics. At Middlebury, she co-founded a local chapter of Amnesty International USA. After graduating, she received a Harry S. Truman Scholarship and later completed a master's degree in public policy at the Harvard Kennedy School.

She served as the youngest board member of Amnesty International USA for six years and has since been a recipient of several awards, including the United Nations Association of the United States of America Leo Nevas Human Rights Youth Award, the Running Start Rising Political Star, Forbes 30 under 30, Echoing Green Fellowship, and the David Prize.

=== Malikah (formerly Women's Initiative for Self Empowerment) ===
Abdelhamid first pitched her idea for a self-defense class taught by women for women to her imam at the Queens Community Centre when she was sixteen. This was after she had been attacked on the street by a man who tried to take off her headscarf. Although the class was rejected, she continued to pitch the idea and held her first class for Women's Initiative for Self Empowerment (WISE) in 2010.

Since then, WISE chapters have expanded to other parts of the United States and internationally, in Edinburgh, Dublin, and Madrid. The program grew to incorporate a summer camp in New York called Mentee Muslimah. Abdelhamid describes creating WISE as "part of her 'healing process,'" according to Elle. She told National Catholic Reporter that so-called "hijab grabs" are a common experience for Muslim women.

The organization has evolved to Malikah, a global collective of women committed to building security and power for communities. Since the launch, the center has expanded its work to include financial literacy programs, food pantries, boot camps, workshops in public schools, religious institutions, and other community-based organizations.

=== Hijabis of New York ===
In 2014, Abdelhamid launched a social media project called "Hijabis of New York" in order to "humanize and diversify the public narratives of Muslim women who wear hijabs," according to PBS. Hosted on Facebook, the projects features interviews conducted by Abdelhamid accompanied by photographs from various professionals. In 2017, she and Maryam Aziz of WISE, along with Robie Flores and Alison Withers, created a Self-Defense Starter Kit, which includes online resources and videos for Muslim women.

=== Assembly Bill A6219B ===
In addition to her organizational work, Abdelhamid has been involved in advocacy for Middle Eastern and North African (MENA) communities in New York. She participated in grassroots organizing and community outreach through Malikah to support the passage of the MENA Bill (S6584C/A6219B), legislation requiring New York State agencies to disaggregate MENA populations from the White category on government documents. The law, signed by Governor Kathy Hochul on December 20, 2024, ensures that MENA New Yorkers are properly recognized in state-collected demographic data, addressing historical underrepresentation and improving access to resources and services. Abdelhamid's efforts included canvassing, coalition-building, and public engagement to raise awareness of the bill's importance for MENA communities' visibility, political voice, and equity in state programs.

=== Publications ===
Abdelhamid's debut book, Get Home Safe: A Guide to Self-Defense and Building Our Collective Power, was released on February 24, 2026. The work provides guidance on self-defense and community empowerment, drawing on her experiences as a Muslim woman and self-defense instructor. The book focuses on promoting physical, financial, and political safety for individuals and communities.

== Political involvement ==
=== 2022 U.S. House campaign ===
On April 14, 2021, Abdelhamid announced her candidacy for the 2022 U.S. House of Representatives election in New York's 12th congressional district against incumbent Carolyn Maloney. She was endorsed by progressive group Justice Democrats, as well as New York City Comptroller Brad Lander. During her campaign, Abdelhamid criticized incumbent Maloney for wearing a burqa in a speech to illustrate the oppression of women in Afghanistan. According to Abdelhamid, the idea that Afghan women need to be saved is an "Islamophobic narrative" weaponizing Muslim identity "to justify American wars.".

Abdelhamid withdrew from the race after new district boundary maps were released. She stated in a press release:

After nearly two years of putting together this effort, this was a very difficult decision to make. But because my community and I were cut out of our district, we were left with no other choice [...] The new NY-12 [...] no longer includes Queens or Brooklyn. That means that my home and my community which includes, working class, Black and brown, Muslim and Arab immigrant communities of interest in Queens, were all divided into two districts, NY-7 and NY-14, diluting our opportunity for representation and political power.

She wrote that the newly drawn maps were "reminiscent of an ongoing legacy of noninclusive gerrymandering which continues to rob communities of interest like my own of the opportunity for representation."

=== 2026 State Assembly campaign ===
Abdelhamid filed to run for New York's 36th State Assembly district special election which covers the western Queens district, including Astoria. This seat was previously held by Mayor Zohran Mamdani from 2020 until his inauguration to mayor on January 1, 2026. Abdelhamid announced her campaign at a community event in Astoria, emphasizing priorities such as affordable housing protections, universal childcare, immigrant rights, and community safety initiatives. Her policy platform includes support for statewide tenant protections, increased New York City Housing Authority funding, community land trusts, and expanded youth and mental health programming. She has also pledged to advocate for immigrant-focused legislation such as New York for All and the MELT Act, drawing on her work with asylum seeker and local migrant communities.

While Abdelhamid is a member of the Democratic Socialists of America (DSA), the organization's New York City chapter overwhelmingly voted to endorse former Queens DSA co-chair Diana Moreno for the seat. Another DSA member and former candidate for New York's 37th Assembly district in 2020, Mary Jobaida, also filed to run. Moreno also received the backing of the Queens Democratic Party, allowing her to run as a Democrat in the special election. Abdelhamid continued her campaign, running on the third-party Queens for All line.

Moreno defeated Abdelhamid in the election, with Abdelhamid taking 17% of the vote to Moreno's 74%.

== Published works ==
- Get Home Safe: A Guide to Self-Defense and Building Our Collective Power (2026)
