= Chowbus =

American online food ordering service

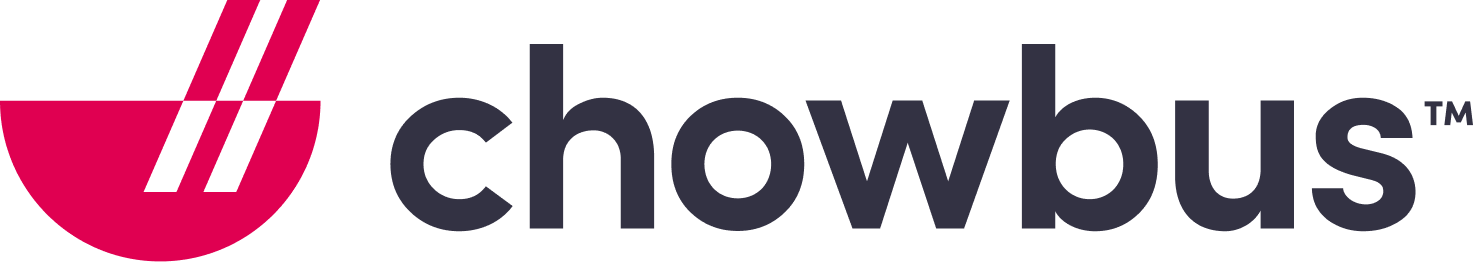
- Industry: Point of sale
- Founded: 2016; 10 years ago
- Founders: Suyu Zhang; Linxin Wen
- Headquarters: Chicago, Illinois, United States
- Products: Cloud-based point of sale systems for restaurants and bars
- Website: www.chowbus.com

Chowbus is a technology company specializing in restaurant services, originally established as an online food ordering, payment, and delivery platform. It was founded in Chicago, United States in 2016 by Linxin Wen and Suyu Zhang. The company initially focused on improving access to Asian restaurants on digital platforms. Over time, Chowbus expanded its services beyond delivery, venturing into software for restaurants, including a cloud-based point of sale (POS) system. The company has since evolved into a SaaS and AI-driven platform supporting restaurant operations and services across the United States and Canada.

== History ==
Chowbus was conceived from the experiences of co-founder Linxin Wen, who, upon moving to the U.S., realized the difficulty of finding genuine Asian restaurants on existing delivery platforms and the high costs associated with their delivery services. Inspired by this challenge, Wen, along with Suyu Zhang, launched Chowbus in 2016 to support these restaurants by providing a dedicated platform.

Starting with a focus on delivery, Chowbus soon extended its reach to over 20 cities across North America, Canada, and Australia, featuring menus in multiple languages including Mandarin and Cantonese. The platform offered a selection of Asian cuisines such as Chinese, Japanese, Korean, Vietnamese, and Indian. By 2022, alongside its successful delivery model, Chowbus expanded into the software as a service (SaaS) market, introducing restaurant management software and POS services. This shift aimed to support especially those restaurant owners new to the country, helping them with technological and marketing needs.

On January 25, 2024, Chowbus sold its food delivery service to Fantuan Delivery. The existing Chowbus app was discontinued and service was migrated to Fantuan. The remaining parts of the Chowbus company have since shifted its focus toward the development and enhancement of its SaaS and POS services for restaurants.

In September, 2025, Chowbus SaaS and POS business generated over $120 million in Annual Recurring Revenue (ARR), driven entirely by its tech platform launched less than two years ago. In that time, the company has also surpassed $4 billion in processed transaction volume

== Funding ==
Chowbus has raised multiple rounds of venture funding since its founding.

The company raised a $4 million seed round led by Greycroft Partners and FJ Labs. In July 2020, Chowbus secured a $33 million Series A funding round, followed by an additional $30 million from existing investors in October of the same year.

In August 2023, Chowbus raised $40 million in a funding round that included Prysm Capital, FJ Labs, and Celtic House Asia Partners.

In 2026, Chowbus raised $81 million in a Series E funding round led by Prysm Capital and Left Lane Capital, with participation from Dutchess, Fika, and Avid Bank.

== Recognition ==
In recognition of its rapid growth and impact, Chowbus was listed in the Marketplace 100 by Andreessen Horowitz in February 2020. Ranking No. 78, Chowbus was highlighted as one of the largest and fastest-growing consumer-facing marketplace startups in the U.S., and it stood out as one of only 13 companies from the Midwest featured in this prestigious list, including seven from Chicago.
