= Diana Moreno =

American politician (born 1987)

Member of the New York State Assembly from the 36th district
- Incumbent
- Assumed office February 4, 2026
- Preceded by: Zohran Mamdani

Personal details
- Born: August 26, 1987 (age 39) Quito, Ecuador
- Party: Democratic
- Other political affiliations: Working Families (Note: Elected on both Democratic and WFP ballot lines in New York via electoral fusion.); Democratic Socialists of America
- Children: 1
- Education: University of Florida (BA, MA)
- Website: dianaforqueens.com

Diana C. Moreno (born August 26, 1987) is an American politician who is a member of the New York State Assembly for the 36th district. She succeeded Zohran Mamdani, who became Mayor of New York City. She was sworn in the day after winning the special election, on February 4, 2026.

== Early life and career ==
Moreno was born and raised in Quito, Ecuador, and her family immigrated to Lakeland, Florida, in 1999 when she was eleven years old. Moreno earned a Bachelor of Arts in political science in 2011 and a Master of Arts in Latino studies in 2016 from the University of Florida. She then worked as assistant director of multicultural and diversity affairs at the school. In 2019, she moved to Queens to work for the New Immigrant Community Empowerment, where she worked until 2023. She then worked as communications manager for the New York State Nurses Association until leaving in October 2025 to focus on her Assembly campaign.

Moreno served as co-chair of the New York City Democratic Socialists of America’s (NYC-DSA) Queens branch from 2021 to 2023 and as the organization's communications coordinator from 2023 to 2024. She has volunteered on the campaigns of numerous democratic socialist candidates in Queens, including: State Senator Kristen Gonzalez, Assemblymembers Zohran Mamdani and Claire Valdez, and Councilmember Tiffany Cabán.

== New York State Assembly ==
In October 2025, Moreno announced her campaign for a potential special election to the New York State Assembly in the 36th district if incumbent Assemblymember Zohran Mamdani was elected in the 2025 New York City mayoral election. After his victory, she received the NYC-DSA and Mamdani's endorsement, then was nominated by both the Queens Democratic Party and the New York Working Families Party. Mary Jobaida and Rana Abdelhamid also sought the Democratic nomination but lost to Moreno, with Jobaida applying unsuccessfully for endorsement by NYC-DSA. Both candidates ran as independents against Moreno in the special election. The Associated Press declared Moreno the winner on election night.

== Electoral history ==
2026 New York State Assembly special election, District 36
Party	Candidate	Votes	%
Democratic	Diana Moreno	3,389	38.80%
Working Families	Diana Moreno	3,083	35.31%
Total	Diana Moreno	6,472	74.11%
Queens For All	Rana Abdelhamid	1,491	17.07%
People First	Mary Jobaida	665	7.61%
Write-in		106	1.21%
Total votes		8,734	100.00%
Democratic hold			

== Personal life ==
Moreno resides in Astoria, Queens, with her partner. They have one son. She is queer.
