= Fantuan Delivery =

Canadian food delivery platform

Fantuan
- Native name: 饭团外卖
- Industry: Online food ordering
- Founded: 2014
- Founders: Randy Wu; Yaofei Feng
- Headquarters: Burnaby, British Columbia, Canada
- Area served: Canada, United States, United Kingdom, Australia
- Key people: Randy Wu (CEO)
- Products: Food delivery, grocery delivery, courier services, digital marketing, lifestyle deals
- Website: fantuan.ca

Fantuan Delivery
- Simplified Chinese: 饭团外卖
- Traditional Chinese: 飯糰外賣
Transcriptions
Standard Mandarin
- Hanyu Pinyin: Fàntuán Wàimài

Fantuan (Chinese: 饭团外卖; pinyin: Fàntuán Wàimài) is a Canadian food delivery platform focused on Asian cuisine based in Burnaby, British Columbia. The Fantuan mobile app allows users to order food, receive deliveries, place grocery orders, access lifestyle deals, and request same-city errands. Delivery drivers, who work as independent contractors, accept orders and receive payments and tips through the app.

== Name and branding ==
The Chinese word Fantuan refers to a rice ball, which also serves as the logo of the company.

== History ==
Fantuan was founded in 2014 by Randy Wu, then an economics student at Simon Fraser University, and Yaofei Feng, who had completed a master's degree in computer science at Oregon State University and left his role as a software engineer at Amazon to join the startup. The two founders met online through the video game Dota and shared similar experiences as international students from China. They noted that familiar Asian food options were lacking near their university campuses, inspiring them to build a delivery service tailored to these communities.

Wu modelled Fantuan after the Chinese platform Meituan. In the company's early stage, Wu and Feng personally ordered food from restaurants and delivered it to customers.

Fantuan expanded to Toronto in September 2016, marking its first major move outside British Columbia. The company entered the United States in 2019, beginning in Seattle before moving into New York and California, states with large Chinese American populations.

In January 2021, Fantuan released the English version of its app, allowing English speaking locals to use Fantuan's services.

Fantuan received US$40 million in Series C funding in December 2023. Investors included Celtic House Asia, GrubMarket, Vision Plus, JSD Capital, and other firms and entrepreneurs involved in China's food delivery and retail technology sectors.

In 2022, Fantuan entered its first overseas markets outside North America by expanding to the United Kingdom and Australia.

In January 2024, Fantuan announced that it had acquired the food delivery business of Chowbus.

== Services ==
Fantuan's services are centered on providing food delivery for Chinese and Asian cuisine, with a particular focus on serving Chinese communities in North America. The platform initially targeted new immigrants and international students, who often faced challenges when using mainstream delivery apps, including unfamiliar English-language interfaces, limited support for WeChat Pay and Alipay, and restaurant rating systems that did not always reflect the quality of Chinese restaurants. Drawing inspiration from China's multi-function "super-apps," Fantuan integrates several lifestyle and local-service features within one platform.

Some Chinese restaurants listed on Fantuan operate as Fantuan exclusives. In an interview with 36Kr in 2019, the company stated that many Chinese restaurants unable to build large followings on mainstream platforms had chosen to partner with Fantuan, which promotes these restaurants through its online and offline marketing teams.
