= Aravella Simotas =

American politician (born 1978)

- Αραβέλλα Σιμωτά
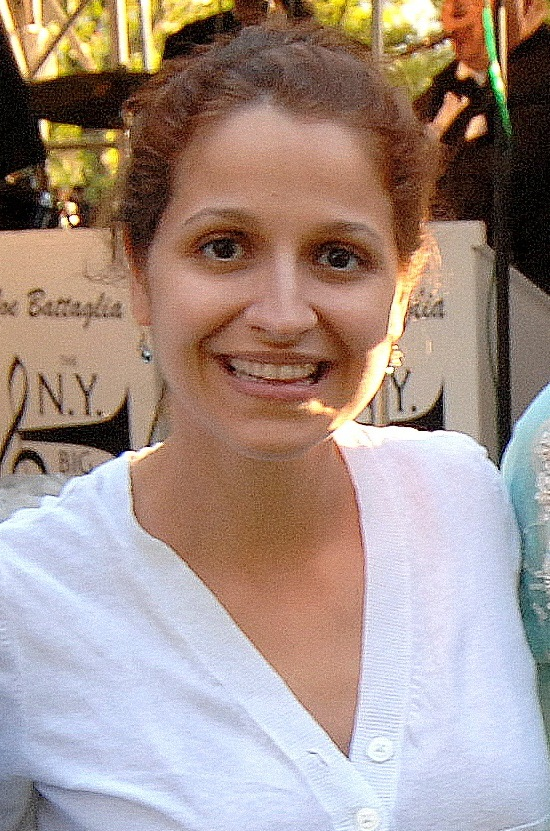
- Simotas in 2012

Member of the New York State Assembly from the 36th district
- In office January 1, 2011 – December 31, 2020
- Preceded by: Michael Gianaris
- Succeeded by: Zohran Mamdani

Personal details
- Born: October 9, 1978 (age 48) Que Que, Rhodesia (now Kwekwe, Zimbabwe)
- Party: Democratic
- Spouse: John Katsanos
- Children: 1
- Education: Fordham University (BA, JD)
- Occupation: Politician; lawyer
- Website: Official website

Aravella Simotas (Greek: Αραβέλλα Σιμωτά, born October 9, 1978) is a Greek-American attorney and politician who served as a member of New York State Assembly from the 36th district from 2011 to 2020. She is a member of the Democratic Party.

Her district covered parts of Western Queens, including Astoria and portions of Long Island City. She was defeated in 2020, losing the Democratic primary to Zohran Mamdani. Since leaving office, Simotas has held government affairs roles at financial services company BNY and trade association the Real Estate Board of New York.

== Early life and career ==
Simotas was born in Que Que, Rhodesia. She and her family emigrated to the United States from Greece and settled in Astoria, Queens, when she was six-months old. She graduated from P.S. 17, Junior H.S. 126, and William C. Bryant High School.

She received a B.A. degree (summa cum laude) from Fordham University in 1999, followed by a J.D. degree from the Fordham University School of Law in 2002. During law school, she was the managing editor at the Fordham Environmental Law Journal.

Simotas began her career in public service as a district representative for Speaker of the New York City Council, Peter Vallone Sr. and later for New York City Council member Peter Vallone Jr. While at law school, she also worked at the New York State Department of Environmental Conservation.

After law school, Simotas served as a law clerk at the United States Court of International Trade and later practiced law in New York City. Simotas served as a member of the Queens Community Planning Board and the United Community Civic Association.

== Electoral history ==
=== 2010 election ===
Simotas was first elected to office in 2010. She received the Democratic Party nomination and ran unopposed in the November 2, 2010, general election.

=== 2012 election ===
Simotas was unopposed in the 2012 Democratic primary. In the general election, she ran on both the Democratic and Working Families Party lines and was opposed by Republican Julia Haitch.

According to preliminary results collected by the Daily News, Simotas won re-election to the State Assembly, for the new District 36, in the general election on November 6, 2012, with 84% of the vote.

=== 2020 election ===
She lost her 2020 Democratic primary to Zohran Mamdani.

=== Committee assignments ===
During her time in the State Assembly, Simotas's committee assignments included:

- Chair, Committee on Ethics and Guidance
- Co-chair, Legislative Ethics Commission
- Insurance
- Judiciary
- Ways and Means
- Energy

Simotas was appointed Chair of the Assembly's Ethics and Guidance Committee in 2017. Under her leadership, the Committee updated the Assembly's policy prohibiting harassment and discrimination to require expedited investigations and expand the types of conduct violating the policy.

From 2014 to 2017, Simotas served as Chair of the Assembly's Task Force on Women's Issues and Administrative and Regulatory Review Commission.

== Policy positions ==
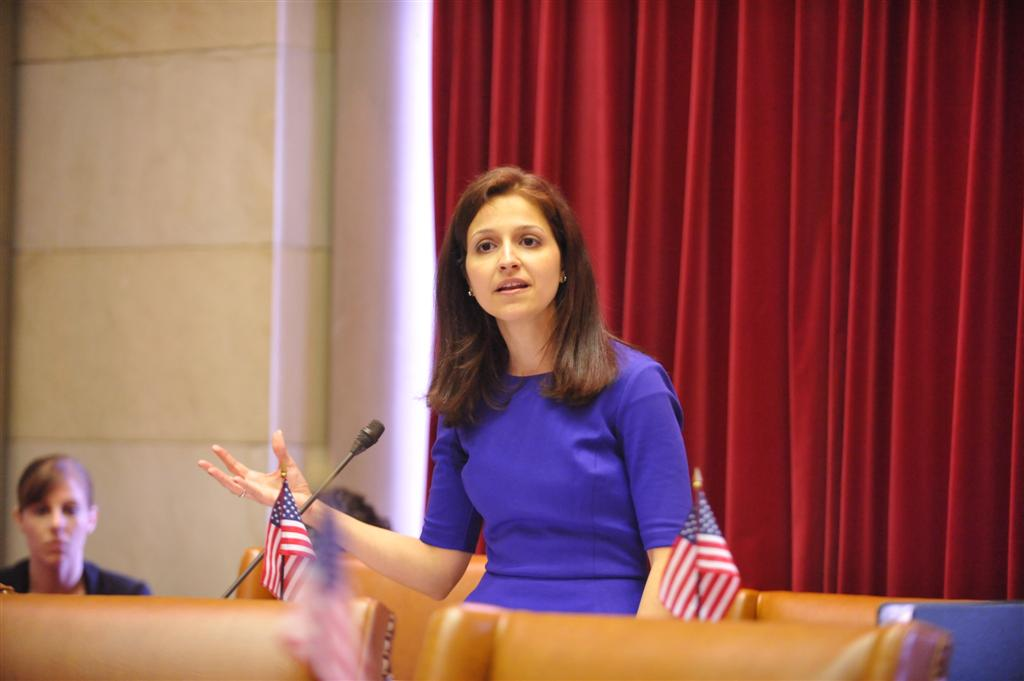
Simotas Debates CFDA in Chamber

=== Sexual violence ===
In 2012, Simotas introduced the "Rape is Rape" bill to expand the definition of rape in New York State law to include forced anal and oral sexual contact. The bill was passed in the Assembly repeatedly beginning in 2013, and was eventually signed into law in 2024.

Simotas sponsored legislation in 2016 to combat the rape kit backlog by mandating timely processing and testing of rape kits. In 2017, she introduced legislation to establish a Sexual Assault Survivors' Bill of Rights and prevent premature destruction of evidence. The bill was signed into law in 2018.

In 2019, the legislature passed Simotas' bill to extend New York's five-year statute of limitations for second- and third-degree rape to 20 years and 10 years, respectively.

Simotas introduced legislation to strengthen workplace sexual harassment protections and advocated for public hearings on the issue after 27 years. In June 2019, a bill she sponsored was passed, removing the severe or pervasive standard for harassment claims, extending the complaint filing period, increasing employer accountability for supervisor misconduct, and setting restrictions on non-disclosure agreements.

Simotas proposed bills to address sexual abuse in medical settings, including background checks for health care providers, expanded online patient rights information, and patient notification of disciplined doctors.

=== Health care ===
In 2015, legislation introduced by Simotas made New York the first state in the country to designate pregnancy as a qualifying event to enroll in health insurance through the state health exchange.

In 2016, Simotas introduced the Fair Access to Fertility Treatment Act to require insurers to cover in vitro fertilization, as well as fertility preservation services for cancer patients. Provisions of Simotas' proposal were enacted as part of the 2019–2020 state budget.

Simotas introduced legislation to establish a Newborn Health and Safe Sleep Pilot Program to combat infant mortality by distributing "baby boxes", essential care items and educational materials to new parents in high-risk areas. The bill was signed into law in October 2017.

=== LGBTQ rights ===
Simotas voted in favor of same-sex marriage in New York. Simotas had been a lead sponsor ("co-sponsor") of Assembly Bill A08354, which passed the Assembly by an 80–63 vote, later passed the Senate, and was signed into law by Governor Andrew Cuomo. Since she first took office, Simotas supported the Gender Expression Non-Discrimination Act (GENDA), for which she was a "multi-sponsor".

=== Criminal justice ===
In 2019, Simotas introduced legislation to close a loophole in New York's Raise the Age law to expand eligibility for record sealing.

Simotas voted against rollbacks to bail reform in the FY 2020–2021 state budget.

=== Energy and environment ===
Simotas served as chairperson of Smart Power NY, a coalition to develop new energy sources for Western Queens. One of its goals was to support the replacement of "decades-old, dirty" power plants in Astoria with newer generators.

=== Other issues ===
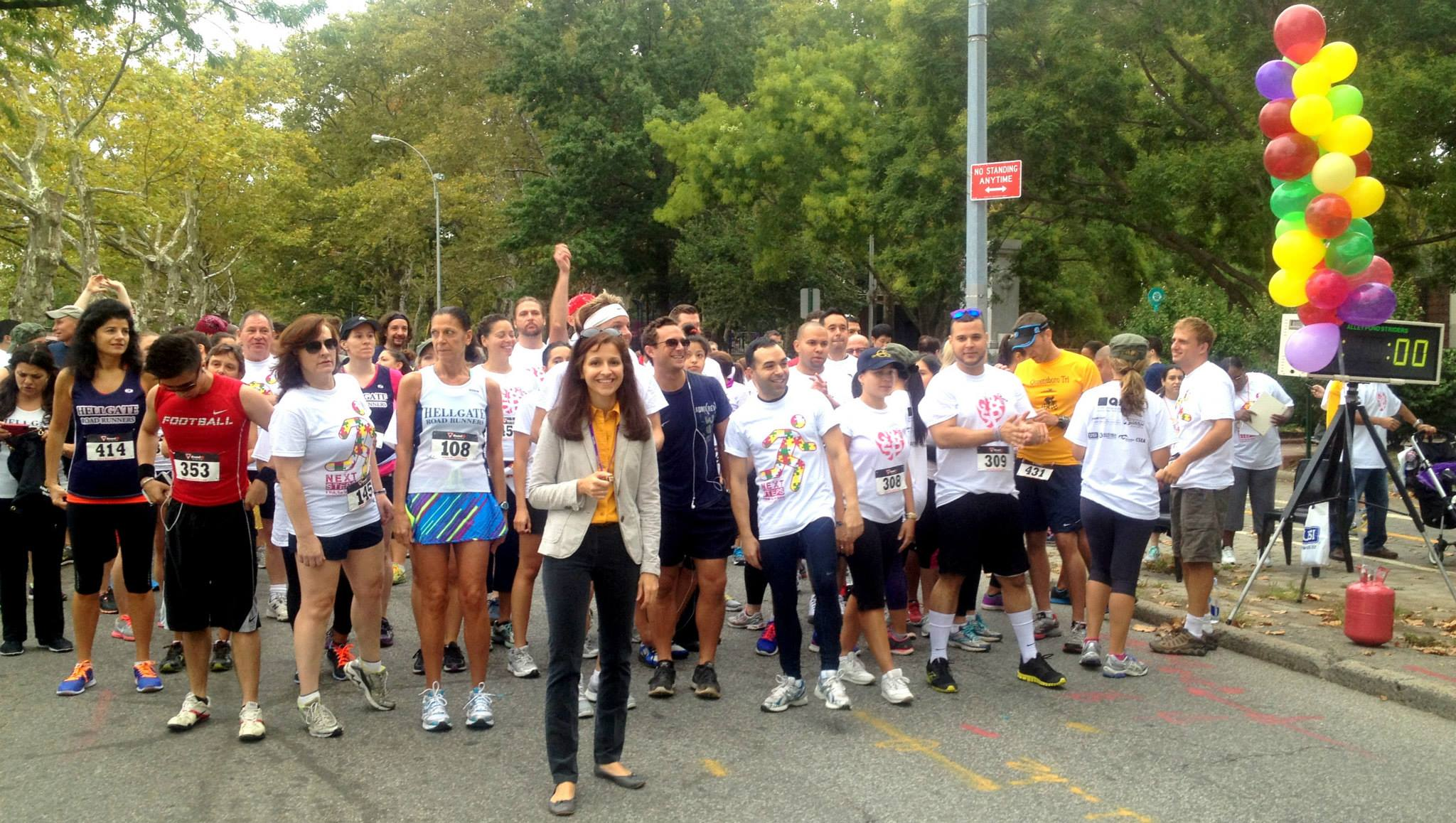
Simotas at the QSAC's annual 5K race for Autism in September 2013

Simotas advocated for more polling sites and expanded early voting.

Simotas joined public officials in protesting a Golden Dawn recruitment meeting in Queens, opposing its anti-immigrant message.

Simotas supported the expansion of Mount Sinai Queens hospital, citing the need for more healthcare services in western Queens.

In 2013, Simotas supported maintaining and expanding Gifted and Talented programs in her district. She also worked to keep local public schools open, including Long Island City High School.

Simotas urged Mayor Bill de Blasio to address street waste and litter in Astoria.

== Personal life and later career ==
Simotas is married to John Katsanos, and they have one daughter, born in 2012.

Since leaving office, Simotas worked as head of state and local government affairs at financial services company BNY and has been the Real Estate Board of New York's SVP of government affairs since August 2024.

New York State Assembly
Preceded by Michael N. Gianaris	New York State Assembly 36th District; January 1, 2011 – December 31, 2020	Succeeded by Zohran Mamdani
