= Zohran Mamdani =

Mayor of New York City since 2026

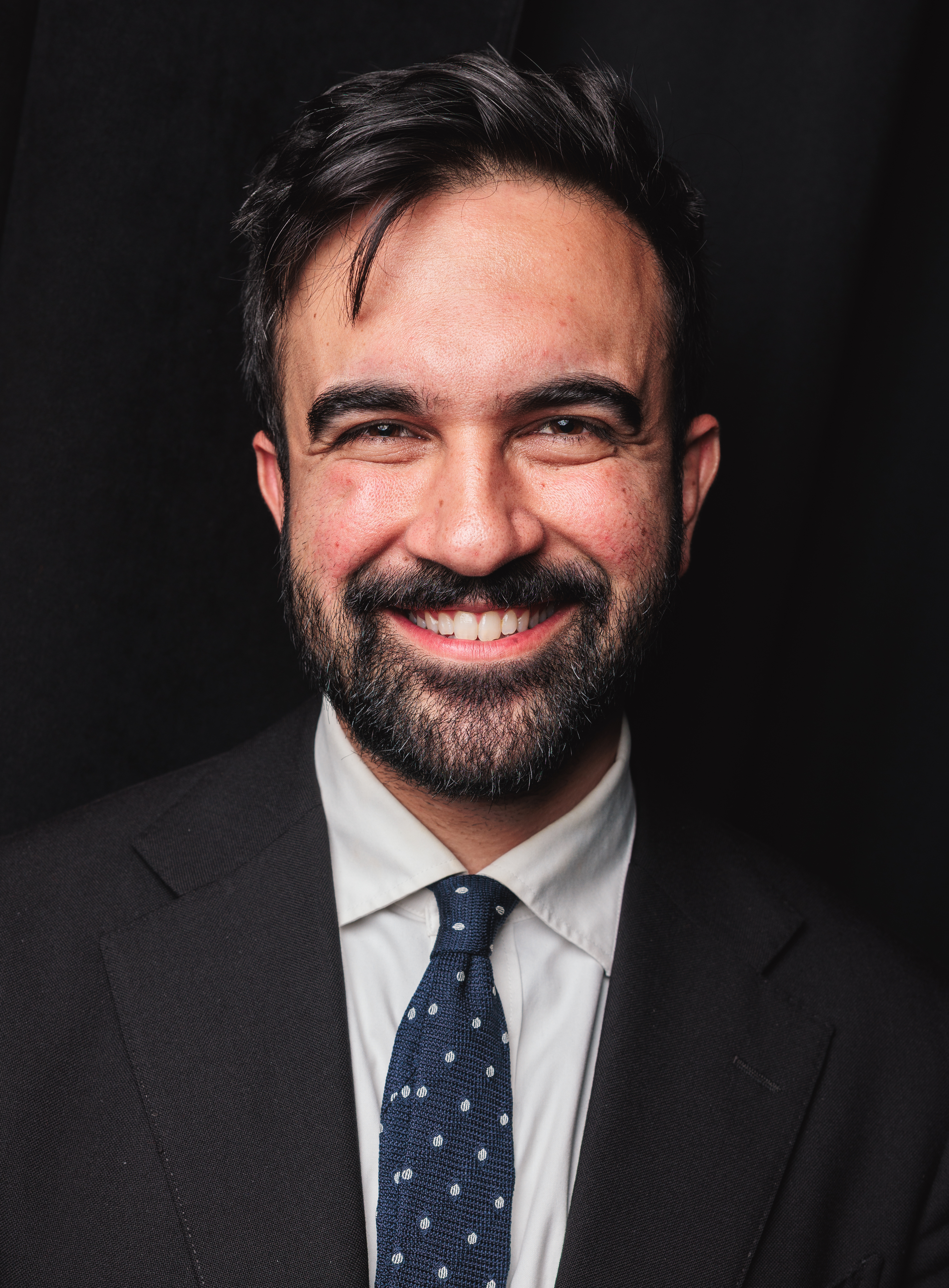
- Mamdani in 2025

112th Mayor of New York City
- Incumbent
- Assumed office January 1, 2026
- First Deputy: Dean Fuleihan
- Preceded by: Eric Adams

Member of the New York State Assembly from the 36th district
- In office January 1, 2021 – December 31, 2025
- Preceded by: Aravella Simotas
- Succeeded by: Diana Moreno

Personal details
- Born: Zohran Kwame Mamdani; October 18, 1991 (age 35) Kampala, Uganda
- Citizenship: Uganda; United States (naturalized, since 2018)
- Party: Democratic
- Other political affiliations: Working Families (Note: Elected on both Democratic and WFP ballot lines in New York via electoral fusion); Democratic Socialists of America (Note: The Democratic Socialists of America (DSA) are not a registered political party. Instead, they are a political organization for those with democratic socialist ideologies. Mamdani is a member of and is endorsed by the New York City DSA chapter.)
- Spouse: Rama Duwaji (m. 2025)
- Parents: Mahmood Mamdani (father); Mira Nair (mother)
- Education: Bowdoin College (BA)
- Website: Office website Campaign website
- Zohran Mamdani's voice Mamdani introducing himself and his mayoral platform Recorded April 9, 2025

Zohran Kwame Mamdani (Note: Pronounced /zəˈ(h)rɑːn ˈkwɑːmeɪ məmˈdɑːni/ zə-(H)RAHN KWAH-may məm-DAH-nee, also commonly /ˈzɔːrɑːn/ ZOR-ahn) (born October 18, 1991) is an American politician serving since January 1, 2026, as the 112th mayor of New York City. (Note: Mamdani was expected to be the city's 111th mayor, but a December 2025 review by the New York City Department of Records and Information Services concluded that the enumeration had omitted Matthias Nicoll's second mayoralty, making Mamdani the 112th.) A member of the Democratic Party and the Democratic Socialists of America, he represented the 36th district in the New York State Assembly from 2021 to 2025. Mamdani is New York City's first Muslim and first Asian American mayor.

Mamdani was born in Kampala, Uganda, to film director Mira Nair and political scientist Mahmood Mamdani, both of Indian descent. He moved to New York City at age seven and graduated from Bowdoin College in 2014 with a bachelor's degree in Africana studies. After graduation, he worked as a housing counselor and rapper, and entered New York City politics as a volunteer for Ali Najmi's 2015 City Council campaign, later managing Ross Barkan's 2018 State Senate campaign. He was first elected to the New York State Assembly in 2020, defeating five-term incumbent Aravella Simotas in the Democratic primary. Representing Astoria and Long Island City, he was reelected without opposition in 2022 and 2024.

In October 2024, Mamdani announced his candidacy for mayor of New York City in the 2025 mayoral election. A democratic socialist, Mamdani campaigned on a progressive, affordability-focused platform, supporting fare-free city buses, universal child care, city-owned grocery stores, a rent freeze on rent-stabilized units, additional affordable housing units, and a $30 minimum wage by 2030. He also expressed support for LGBTQ rights, comprehensive public safety reform, and tax increases on corporations and those earning more than $1 million a year. He won the Democratic primary in June 2025, defeating former governor Andrew Cuomo in an upset, and was elected mayor in the November general election, defeating Cuomo, who ran as an independent, and Republican Curtis Sliwa.

As mayor, Mamdani has focused on affordability. In January 2026, he and Governor Kathy Hochul announced a plan to expand free child care, and in June the Rent Guidelines Board approved a freeze on rents for rent-stabilized apartments. His administration has also named the first site for a planned network of city-owned grocery stores. His tenure has included conflicts with the Trump administration over immigration enforcement, court challenges to his pied-à-terre tax, and criticism from some Jewish organizations and elected officials over his positions on Israel. Mamdami has repeatedly condemned antisemitism and has pledged millions in hate crime prevention funds to fight antisemitism in New York City.

Mamdani's victory challenged the centrist establishment of the Democratic party and presaged a wave of progressive and leftist victories in the 2026 midterm elections. Increasingly, he is viewed as a power broker within the party.

== Early life and education ==
Zohran Kwame Mamdani was born on October 18, 1991, at Nsambya Hospital in Kampala, Uganda, the only child of postcolonialist academic Mahmood Mamdani and filmmaker Mira Nair. He was given his middle name, Kwame, by his father in honor of Kwame Nkrumah, the first president of Ghana. Both his parents are of Indian descent. His father is a Gujarati Muslim who was born in Mumbai and raised in Uganda as part of the Indian diaspora in East Africa. His mother is a Punjabi Hindu who was born in Rourkela, in the Indian state of Odisha, and raised in Delhi. Mamdani's paternal family belongs to the Khoja Twelver community.

Mamdani lived in Kampala until the age of five, when his family moved to Cape Town, South Africa, after his father was appointed head of African studies at the University of Cape Town. He attended St. George's Grammar School in Mowbray from 1996 to 1998, during the early post-apartheid years. He later said that the experience of living in Cape Town "taught me what inequality looks like up close ... [and] that justice has to be more than an idea; it has to be material".

The family moved to the United States and settled in New York City when Mamdani was seven, and he was raised in Manhattan's Morningside Heights neighborhood. He has called his upbringing "privileged", saying, "I never had to want for something, and yet I knew that was not in any way the reality for most New Yorkers." As a child, he was often present on his mother's film sets, where film crew members variously called him "Z", "Zoru", "Fadoose", and "Nonstop Mamdani".

=== Education ===
Mamdani attended the Bank Street School for Children on the Upper West Side of Manhattan, where he successfully ran as the independent candidate in a middle school mock election, adopting a platform of "equal rights, anti-war policies that proposed spending money on education rather than the military". In 2003, he returned to Kampala for a year and attended school during his father's sabbatical there; his paternal grandparents and aunt still lived there and helped take care of him while his father was working on the book Good Muslim, Bad Muslim.

In 2010, Mamdani graduated from the Bronx High School of Science in Kingsbridge Heights, Bronx, where he co-founded the school's first cricket team and unsuccessfully ran for student body vice president. He also played soccer with the West Side Soccer League.

Mamdani attended Bowdoin College in Brunswick, Maine, where he co-founded the school's chapter of Students for Justice in Palestine and was a regular contributor to the campus newspaper The Bowdoin Orient, writing the columns "Kwame's Kolumnalu" and "Talk of the Quad". In January 2014, he co-authored an op-ed in the Bangor Daily News urging Bowdoin to join the American Studies Association's boycott of Israel and criticizing the college's president, Barry Mills. He graduated from Bowdoin in 2014 with a bachelor's degree in Africana studies.

== Early career ==
=== Music ===
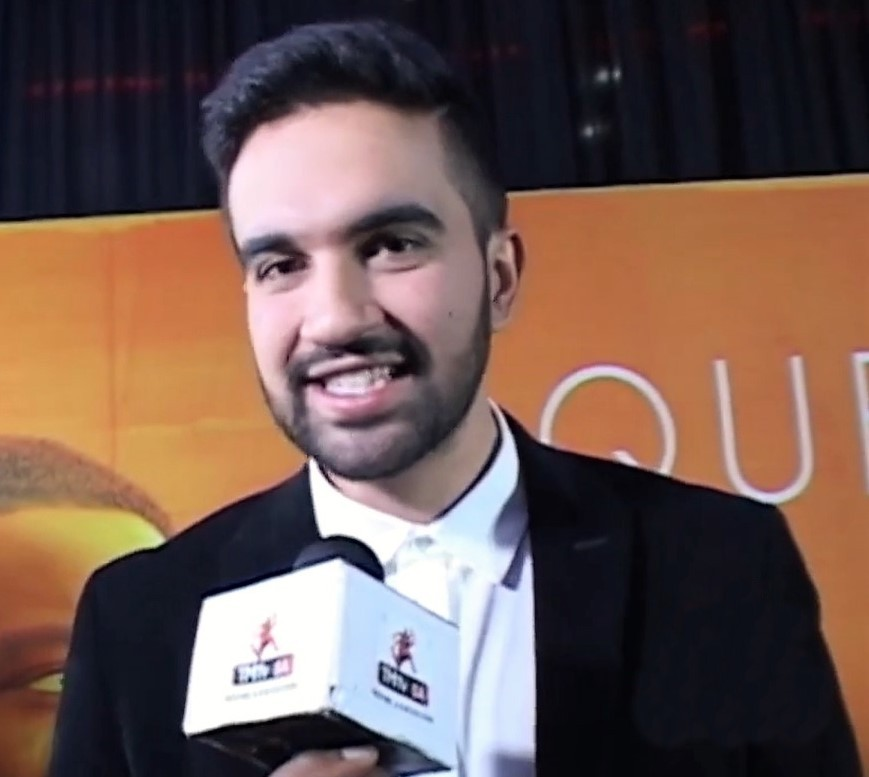
Mamdani at the 2016 Johannesburg premiere of Queen of Katwe

Mamdani is a fan of hip-hop and has composed, performed, and produced rap music. He and his best friend, the Ugandan rapper HAB (Abdul Bar Hussein), whose family is of South Sudanese origin, performed as the duo Young Cardamom & HAB. Their first song, "Kanda [Chap Chap]", was about chapati, an Indian flatbread. They performed tracks from their 2016 EP Sidda Mukyaalo ("No going back to the village") at the Nyege Nyege festival. The pair rapped in languages including Nubi, Luganda, Swahili, and English, partly to create a unique Ugandan style of rap rather than imitating American rap, and partly to convey that Ugandan residents with roots in other countries are all Ugandan. The chapati was chosen as a symbol because it originates in the Indian subcontinent but has become a Ugandan staple. In their music, they addressed social issues in Uganda, such as corruption and "black and brown relations", as well as colonialism. Young Cardamom & HAB were nominated for "Rookie of the Year" at the inaugural Uganda Hip Hop Awards.

Mamdani curated and produced the soundtrack for his mother Mira Nair's 2016 film Queen of Katwe, for which he was nominated for a 2017 Guild of Music Supervisors Award; he co-wrote the song "#1 Spice" with HAB for the film. Mamdani also appears as an extra in the film, and is credited as third assistant director. Nair subsequently offered him parts in the stage musical adaptation of her film Monsoon Wedding, after he took part in stage readings for the show, and her television adaptation of the Vikram Seth novel A Suitable Boy, but he declined.

In 2017, Mamdani released the song "Salaam" under the name Zohran Kwame. In April 2019, under the moniker Mr. Cardamom, he released the single "Nani", an homage to his grandmother. Actress and food writer Madhur Jaffrey portrays Mamdani's grandmother in the video, which pays tribute to Jaffrey and New York's South Asian culture.

=== Political involvement and housing counseling ===
Mamdani entered New York City politics in 2015 as a volunteer on Ali Najmi's campaign in the special election for the 23rd district of the City Council. He has said he became involved after reading a The Village Voice article reporting that Najmi was backed by Heems, a Das Racist co-founder and one of his favorite rappers.

In 2017, Mamdani joined the New York City chapter of the Democratic Socialists of America (DSA) and worked for the campaign of New York City Council candidate Khader El-Yateem, a Palestinian Lutheran minister and democratic socialist from Bay Ridge, Brooklyn. Part of Mamdani's motivation for joining the DSA was its pro-Palestinian stance, which aligned with his own prior activism. Mamdani managed Ross Barkan's unsuccessful 2018 campaign for the New York State Senate and was a field organizer for fellow democratic socialist Tiffany Cabán's narrowly unsuccessful 2019 campaign for Queens County district attorney.

In 2018, Mamdani began working as a foreclosure prevention and housing counselor, helping lower-income immigrant homeowners in Queens avoid eviction. He has said the experience motivated him to run for office to address the housing and affordability crisis.

== New York State Assembly (2020–2025) ==
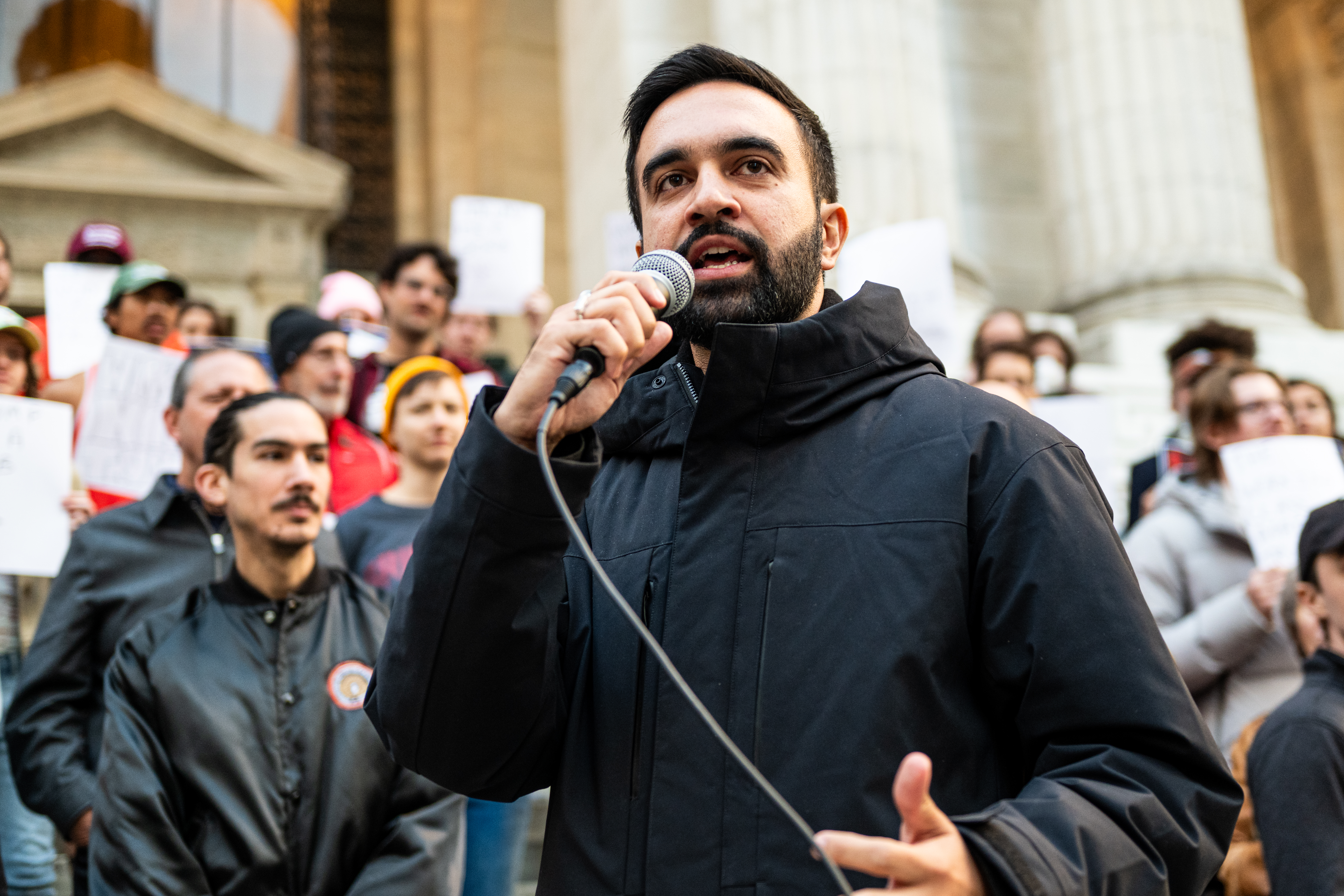
Mamdani at the Resist Fascism Rally in Bryant Park, October 27, 2024

In October 2019, Mamdani announced his campaign to represent New York's 36th State Assembly district, which encompasses Astoria and Long Island City in Queens. Endorsed by the DSA, he ran on a platform of housing reform, police and prison reform, and public ownership of utilities. Mamdani's June 2020 primary victory over five-term Democratic incumbent Aravella Simotas took almost a month to call, and he won the general election with no Republican opposition in November. Mamdani was reelected without opposition in 2022 and 2024.

Mamdani was a member of the DSA's "State Socialists in Office" bloc, which had nine members in 2025, and a member of the Muslim Democratic Club of New York. He was the keynote speaker at the 2023 DSA convention, saying, "We are special as DSA electeds not because of ourselves; we are special because of our organization".

By January 2025, Mamdani was a member of five assembly committees—Aging, Cities, Election Law, Energy, and Real Property Taxation—as well as several caucuses and task forces, including the Black, Puerto Rican, Hispanic and Asian Legislative Caucus and the Asian Pacific American Task Force.

By May 2025, Mamdani had been the primary sponsor of 20 bills in the assembly—three of which became law—and the co-sponsor of 238 bills. As a member of the assembly, he helped launch a successful fare-free bus pilot program and participated in a 2021 hunger strike alongside taxi drivers seeking medallion debt relief. Because of his mayoral campaign, Mamdani attended two-thirds of the 2025 sessions in Albany, with perfect attendance until late April.

== 2025 New York City mayoral election ==
=== Primary ===
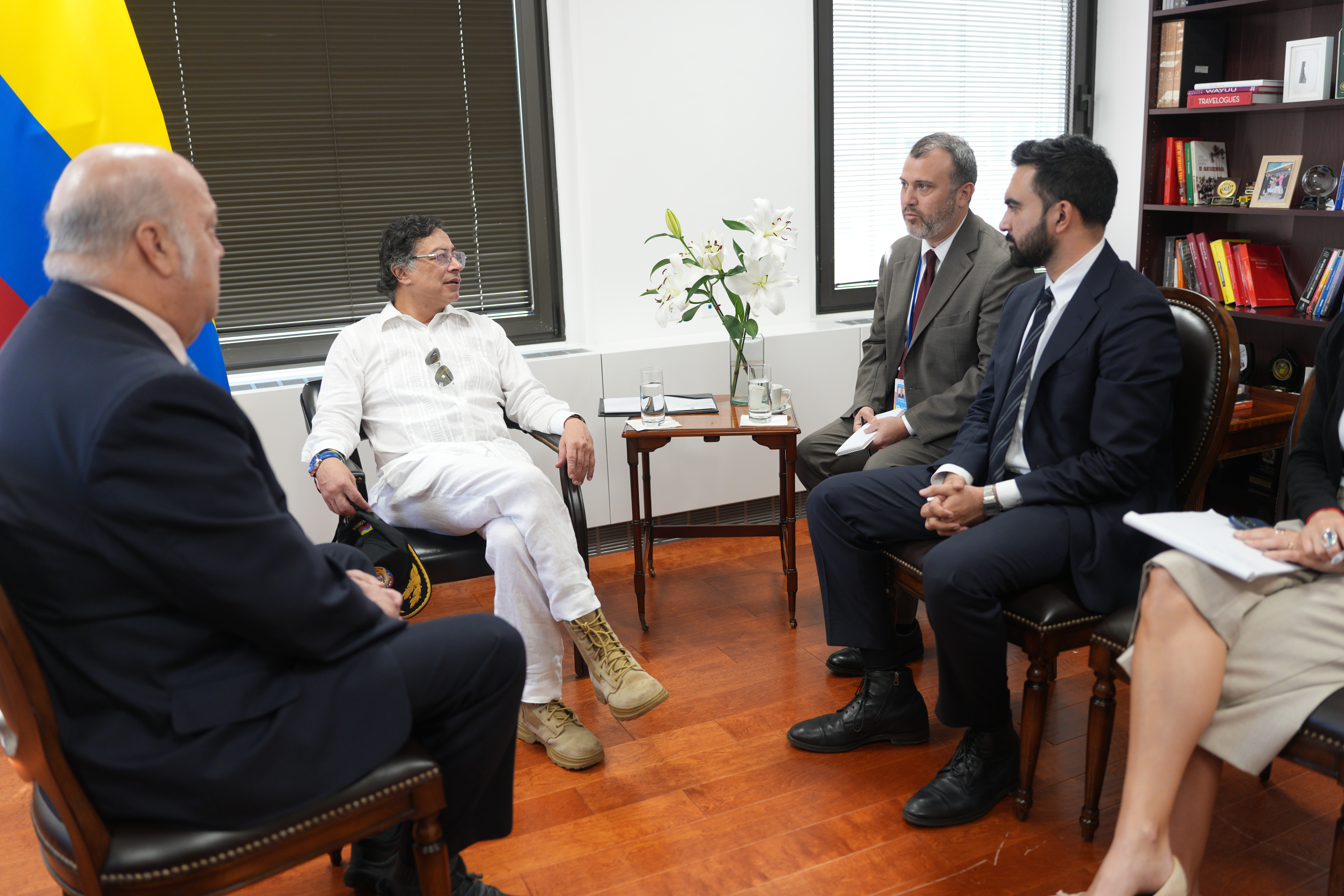
Mamdani with Colombian president Gustavo Petro in New York City, September 26, 2025

On October 23, 2024, Mamdani announced his candidacy for mayor of New York City. His platform centered on affordability: a rent freeze on stabilized apartments, fare-free buses, universal child care, five city-owned grocery stores, 200,000 new affordable housing units, a $30 minimum wage by 2030, public safety reform, and higher taxes on corporations and incomes above $1 million.

For most of the primary campaign, Mamdani trailed Cuomo in polling. He and Cuomo raised similar amounts of money, but his donor base was considerably larger. A poll taken shortly before the June 24 primary showed Mamdani had caught up to Cuomo. On June 13, Mamdani and third-place contender Brad Lander cross-endorsed each other, asking supporters to rank the other second; Mamdani and Michael Blake did the same a few days later. On June 16, The New York Times editorial board advised voters not to rank Mamdani while criticizing Cuomo.

On election night, first-choice results showed Mamdani with a large lead over Cuomo, who conceded that evening. His margin of victory grew under ranked-choice tabulation, aided by the cross-endorsements. On July 1, after the New York City Board of Elections released its ranked-choice ballot tabulation, the Associated Press announced Mamdani had won the primary. News outlets described it as a major upset.

During the primary, Mamdani's campaign was supported by the New Yorkers for Lower Costs super PAC, which spent approximately $1.3 million supporting him and opposing Cuomo before the primary and raised an additional $1 million afterward. The super PAC received $100,000 from the Unity and Justice Fund in May and June 2025; Cuomo accused Mamdani of accepting "dirty money", saying the fund was tied to the Council on American-Islamic Relations.

After Mamdani won the primary, some attacks on him, including by Republican members of Congress, invoked racist, xenophobic, and Islamophobic tropes, particularly about the September 11 attacks and terrorism. Commentators attributed the success of Mamdani's campaign in part to his use of social media to reach younger voters.

=== General election ===
Mamdani faced Cuomo, who ran as an independent after losing the Democratic primary, and Republican nominee Curtis Sliwa in the November 4 general election. Incumbent mayor Eric Adams ended his reelection campaign in September. Mamdani and Cuomo debated twice, and President Donald Trump urged voters to back Cuomo.

Mamdani won with 50.4% of the vote to Cuomo's 41.6% and Sliwa's 7.1%. More than two million votes were cast, the most in a mayoral race since 1969. He became the city's youngest mayor since Hugh J. Grant in 1892, its first Asian American and Muslim mayor, and its first foreign-born mayor since Abraham Beame.

=== Mayor-elect and transition ===
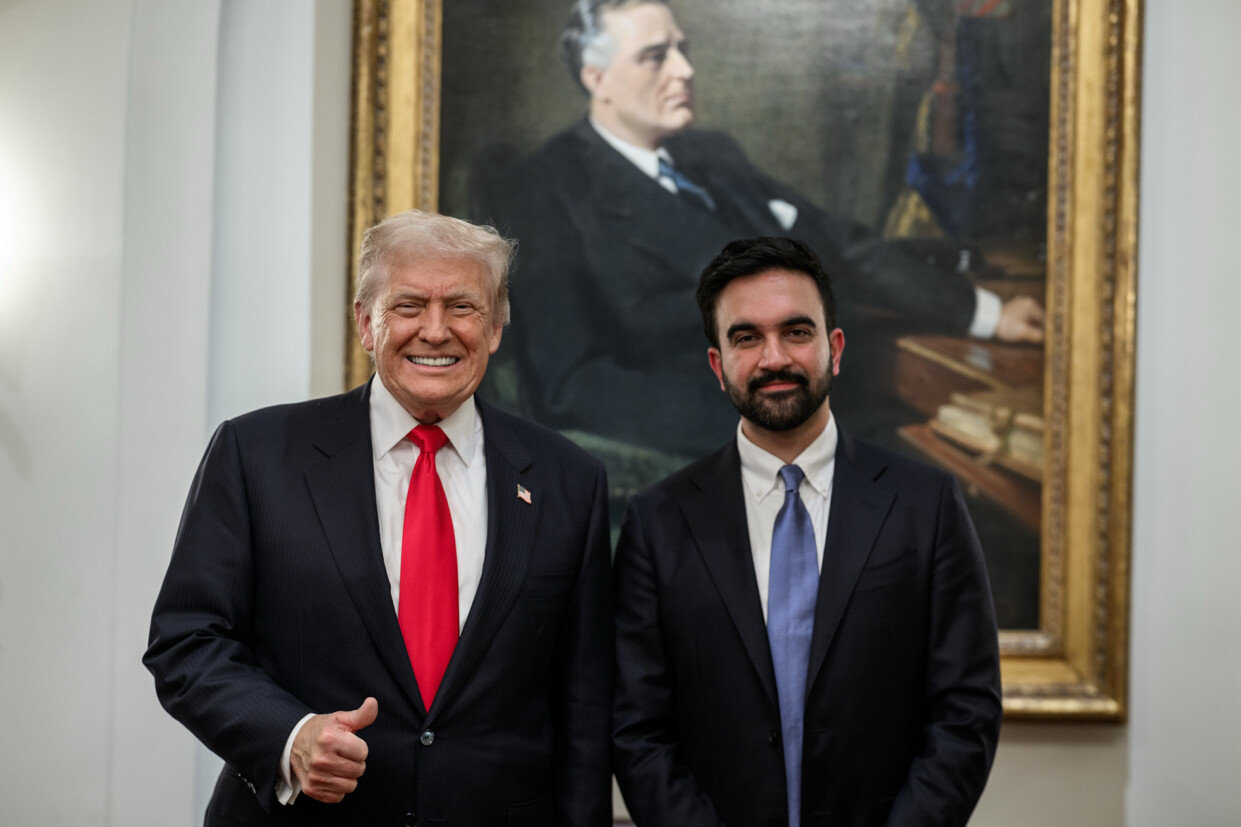
Mamdani's meeting with President Donald Trump at the White House, November 21, 2025

On November 5, 2025, the day after the election, Mamdani announced the first members of his mayoral transition team: Elana Leopold as executive director and four co-chairs—Maria Torres-Springer, the former first deputy mayor; Lina Khan, the former chair of the Federal Trade Commission; Melanie Hartzog; and Grace Bonilla. On November 10, he announced his selection of former first deputy mayor Dean Fuleihan as first deputy mayor, and his former Assembly chief of staff and campaign manager Elle Bisgaard-Church as his chief of staff. On November 19, Mamdani announced that Jessica Tisch would remain as police commissioner, a decision that drew criticism from some police-reform advocates and praise from business and Jewish organizations. He faced criticism for selecting Catherine Almonte Da Costa as director of appointments after antisemitic posts from about a decade earlier resurfaced; Da Costa resigned one day after her appointment.

Mamdani met with President Trump at the White House on November 21. A Mamdani spokesperson said the discussion would focus on public safety, economic security, and affordability. After the meeting, Trump praised Mamdani and said they "agree on a lot more than I would have thought", following months of mutual criticism.

Mamdani's mayoralty was expected to be the city's 111th, but a December 2025 review by the New York City Department of Records and Information Services concluded that the enumeration of New York City mayors had omitted Matthias Nicoll's second mayoralty, making Mamdani the city's 112th mayor.

== Mayor of New York City (2026–present) ==
=== Inauguration ===
External videos
- Mayor-Elect Mamdani Swearing-In, January 1, 2026, C-SPAN
- Mayor Zohran Mamdani Inauguration Ceremony, January 1, 2026, C-SPAN

Mamdani's mayoralty began on January 1, 2026. New York Attorney General Letitia James administered the oath of office in the decommissioned City Hall subway station just after midnight. Mamdani took the oath on two Qurans, his grandfather's and Arturo Alfonso Schomburg's, making him the first New York City mayor to do so. A public inauguration was held in the afternoon, at which Mamdani was ceremonially sworn in by Bernie Sanders. Speakers and performers at the inauguration included Sanders, Alexandria Ocasio-Cortez, Javier Muñoz, Lucy Dacus, and Mandy Patinkin.

Mamdani's first act as mayor, immediately after taking the oath of office, was to appoint transportation consultant, educator, and former NYC Department of Transportation director of capital planning and project management Mike Flynn as his Department of Transportation commissioner. His first executive order was to revoke all executive orders his predecessor Eric Adams made after he was indicted on bribery charges on September 25, 2024; the revoked orders included two that adopted a broad definition of antisemitism and restricted city agencies from boycotting Israel.

=== Administration ===
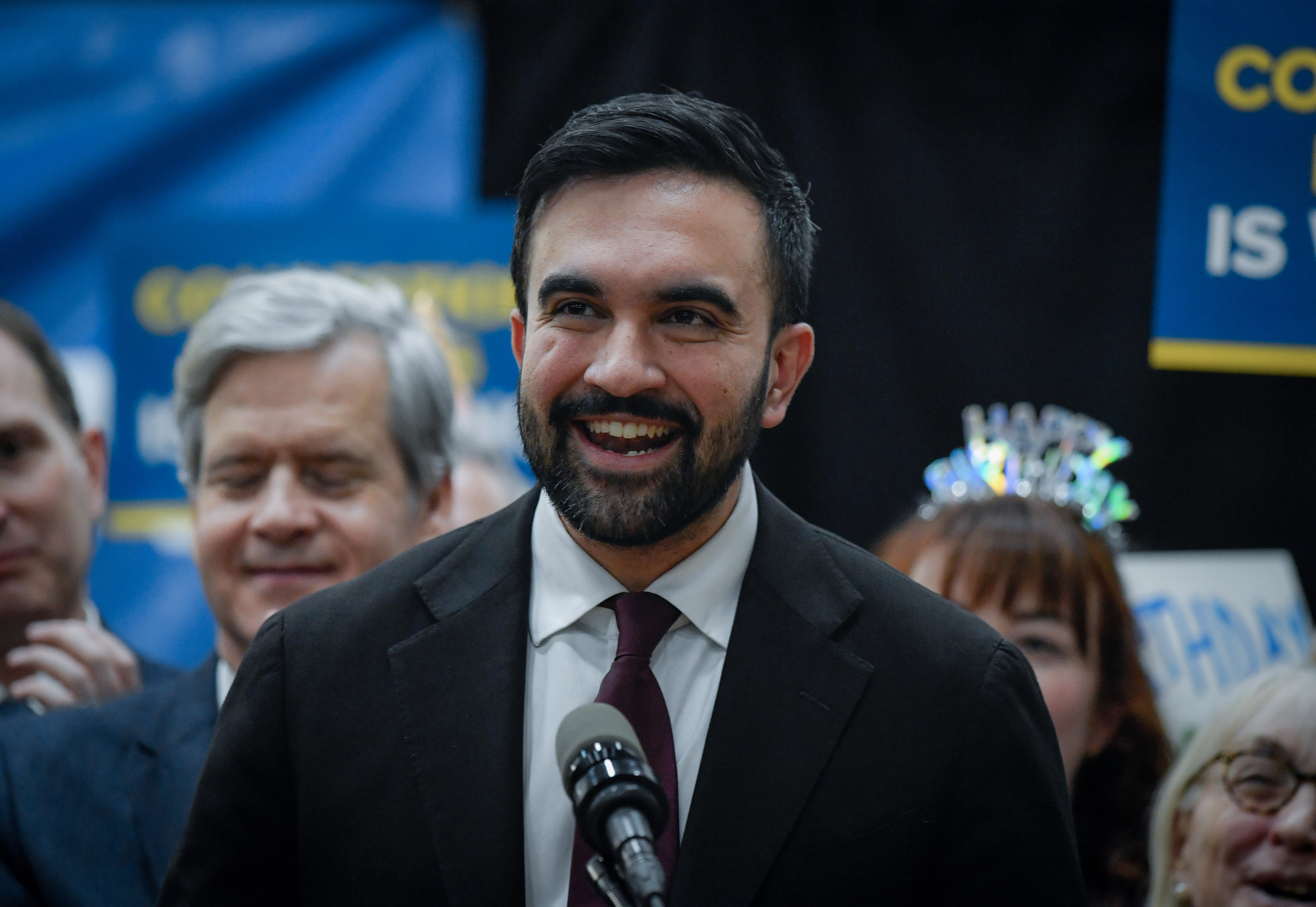
Mamdani attending a congestion pricing anniversary event at the McBurney YMCA on January 5, 2026

One week after his inauguration, Mamdani and Governor Kathy Hochul announced a plan to expand free and low-cost child care in New York City, aiming to eventually provide universal free child care; the state committed about $1.2 billion, covering the start of free care for two-year-olds. One of his first major challenges as mayor was managing the effects of a January 2026 winter storm and the cold snap that followed; 14 people were found dead outdoors, with hypothermia implicated in eight deaths, according to Mamdani. In May 2026, Mamdani's executive budget did not include the property-tax increase he had threatened. A $125.8 billion budget deal with City Council Speaker Julie Menin was reached just before the July 1 deadline. Mamdani acknowledged that free buses would not happen in 2026 after state lawmakers declined to include them.

In February 2026, Mamdani's administration secured a $5.2 million settlement with Uber Eats, HungryPanda, and Fantuan over wage theft affecting nearly 50,000 workers; Uber Eats also agreed to reinstate 10,000 workers who were wrongfully terminated in 2023–24. In September 2026, the city reached a $131.5 million settlement with DoorDash, covering about 264,000 couriers; the Department of Consumer and Worker Protection said it was the largest worker settlement in city history, while DoorDash attributed the errors to bugs and said they were not intentional. On July 10, the Department of Consumer and Worker Protection finalized what it described as the first municipal click-to-cancel rule in the United States, effective October 1, and proposed a rule requiring all-in pricing to ban hidden fees.

On April 14, 2026, Mamdani announced La Marqueta marketplace in Manhattan's East Harlem neighborhood as the first identified site of his planned city-owned grocery stores. He plans to spend roughly $30 million to build the store in the predominantly Latino neighborhood. Five stores are planned, one in each borough. Each will offer groceries at prices 30% below the market rate, as a subsidy from the city budget. The stores are expected to open in phases from 2027 through 2029.

In May 2026, Mamdani announced his housing plan "Block by Block", to build 200,000 new affordable housing units over the next decade, preserve 200,000 others, and expand the city's affordable housing programs. On June 25, the New York City Rent Guidelines Board voted 7–1 to freeze rents on roughly one million rent-stabilized apartments for both one- and two-year leases beginning October 1, 2026, fulfilling a central Mamdani campaign pledge; it was the first time the board had approved a freeze on two-year leases. Hours before the vote, Christina Smyth, one of the board's two owner representatives, resigned, alleging the outcome had been predetermined.

On April 15, 2026, Mamdani and Governor Kathy Hochul announced a pied-à-terre tax, a surcharge on non-primary residences valued above $5 million, with a lower threshold for co-ops. The state legislature enacted it in May 2026 as part of the state budget. In August, Justice Wayne Ozzi of the New York Supreme Court issued a temporary restraining order against the city's rollout; the city appealed, and an appellate judge allowed implementation to proceed. On September 29, Ozzi ruled that the city's process for identifying taxable properties and notifying owners was improper and ordered it to cancel roughly 17,000 notices and replace its property roll; he did not rule on the tax's legality. The city appealed.

In July 2026, Mamdani said he would not accept a salary increase after the New York City Council voted 42–6 on July 16 to approve an 18% raise for citywide elected officials, the first since 2016; his salary would have risen by $47,050.

On September 8, 2026, to commemorate the 25th anniversary of the September 11 attacks, Mamdani launched a public portal containing about 170,000 pages of records on the attacks. According to Time, the records showed that New York City leaders at the time knew the air quality was unsafe in the fallout area while telling the public otherwise.

On September 24, 2026, Israeli Prime Minister Benjamin Netanyahu used his United Nations General Assembly address to call Mamdani "the antisemitic mayor of New York" and accuse him of endangering Jewish New Yorkers. Mamdani responded that Netanyahu's remarks were "baseless lies" meant to "sanitize his genocide of Palestinians." Mamdani had previously said he would seek Netanyahu's arrest under the International Criminal Court's warrant, though in July 2026 he acknowledged that the city lacks independent legal authority to execute the warrant and called on the federal government to act.

Later in September, Mamdani released a report outlining a strategy to fight antisemitism in New York City, in part by using millions of dollars already pledged to fight hate crimes, supporting programs celebrating Jewish traditions, and expanding Holocaust education in city schools. Some New York City elected officials and Jewish organizations, including the UJA-Federation of New York, criticized the report for not defining antisemitism or discussing a link between it and anti-Zionism; the UJA-Federation said the plan "fails to address a central issue that the Mayor himself has perpetuated: rhetoric that demonizes and delegitimizes Israel inevitably leads to the targeting of Jewish New Yorkers."

=== Gracie Mansion bombing attempt ===
On March 7, 2026, two homemade explosive devices were ignited and a third was found in a vehicle during an anti-Islam protest organized by far-right activist and January 6 United States Capitol attack rioter Jake Lang outside Gracie Mansion, Mamdani's official residence as Mayor of New York City. The devices did not detonate or injure anyone, and Mamdani and his wife were not home. Police investigated the attack as "ISIS-inspired terrorism"; Emir Balat, 18, and Ibrahim Kayumi, 19, were taken into custody and later indicted on eight federal counts, including conspiracy to use a weapon of mass destruction. Both were held without bail. Mamdani called the protest "appalling" and the bombing attempt "heinous" but defended the right to peaceful protest.

== Political positions and influence ==
Mamdani identifies as a democratic socialist and is a member of the Democratic Socialists of America. Described as a progressive and left-wing populist, he has advanced policies that have been characterized as center-left and left-wing. Mamdani has maintained that the "struggle for Palestinian liberation" has been at "the core of [his] politics" throughout his political life. His economic platform centers on equity and affordability—supporting debt relief for taxi medallion owners, stronger rent control, tenant protections, and a Social Housing Development Agency to build 200,000 affordable units. In New York City, he advocates raising the local minimum wage to $30 by 2030, implementing higher taxes on corporations and high-income earners to fund free tuition at CUNY and SUNY, universal child care, city-owned grocery stores, and free public transit, while cutting taxes for outer-borough homeowners and reforming New York's property tax system. Mamdani has cited sewer socialism, an early-20th-century democratic socialist movement centered in Milwaukee, Wisconsin, as an inspiration for improving public infrastructure in New York City.

Mamdani supported Proposal 1—a successful 2024 ballot measure that banned discrimination based on ethnicity, gender identity, disability, and reproductive rights—and backs single-payer healthcare through the New York Health Act. He argues that "dignified work, economic stability, and well-resourced neighborhoods" prevent harm better than policing, proposing a civilian Department of Community Safety to handle mental health crises and community outreach. He had voiced support for defunding the NYPD and accused the department of racism, stances for which he later apologized. As a mayoral candidate, he instead emphasized building a cooperative relationship with the department on violent crime prevention while reducing the involvement of police in other matters.

Mamdani has condemned dictatorships in Venezuela and Cuba while criticizing US sanctions on those countries. After the U.S. captured Nicolás Maduro and his wife, Mamdani called the action "a violation of federal and international law". In January 2026, Mamdani criticized the Iranian government's violence against anti-government protesters. He has denounced Indian prime minister Narendra Modi as a "war criminal" and remains a critic of Israel who has described its conduct in Gaza as genocide, describing its policies as apartheid and supporting the movement to boycott, divest from, and sanction the country. He co-sponsored the "Not on our dime!" bill to stop New York charities from funding illegal Israeli settlements. After the October 7 attacks, Mamdani mourned all victims, condemned Hamas's attacks as war crimes, and called for both sides to "lay down their arms" while advocating a permanent ceasefire, the end of Israeli occupation, and the end of ethnocratic policy in favor of "equal rights for all". He said he would arrest Israeli prime minister Benjamin Netanyahu and Russian president Vladimir Putin if they visited New York City to honor the International Criminal Court's arrest warrants. In a statement on July 21, 2026, Mamdani said the municipality of New York City does not have independent legal authority to execute the ICC's arrest warrant but that the US federal government does, calling on the federal government to execute the arrest.

Mamdani connects environmental justice to social equity. He opposed expansion of the gas-fired Astoria Energy power plant, supports the All-Electric Buildings Act and congestion pricing, and proposed a "Green Schools for a Healthier New York City" plan to retrofit schools with solar panels, create green schoolyards, and establish resilience hubs. His platform includes universal pre-K, baby baskets for new families, defending Hasidic yeshivas' autonomy, expanding sanctuary protections for immigrants, making New York City an LGBTQ+ sanctuary city with an Office of LGBTQIA+ Affairs, and eliminating bus fares through expanded MTA funding and free transit initiatives.

After the January 2026 deaths of Renée Good and Alex Pretti, who were both civilians killed by federal border patrol agents during Operation Metro Surge, Mamdani took a strong stance against ICE. He called for abolishing ICE, described Good's and Pretti's killings as murders, and blamed Donald Trump's "year of cruelty" for Good's death. In February 2026, Mamdani signed an executive order requiring ICE agents to get judicial warrants in New York City.

In the 2026 federal elections, three Congressional candidates endorsed by Mamdani—Darializa Avila Chevalier, Brad Lander, and Claire Valdez—won their races, having unseated two Democratic incumbents, Dan Goldman and Adriano Espaillat, who were backed by Hakeem Jeffries. CNN saw Mamdani's influence as a challenge to the city's establishment power brokerage, noting that when Jeffries appeared on screen at a victory party for Valdez, the audience began to chant, "You're next!".

== Personal life ==
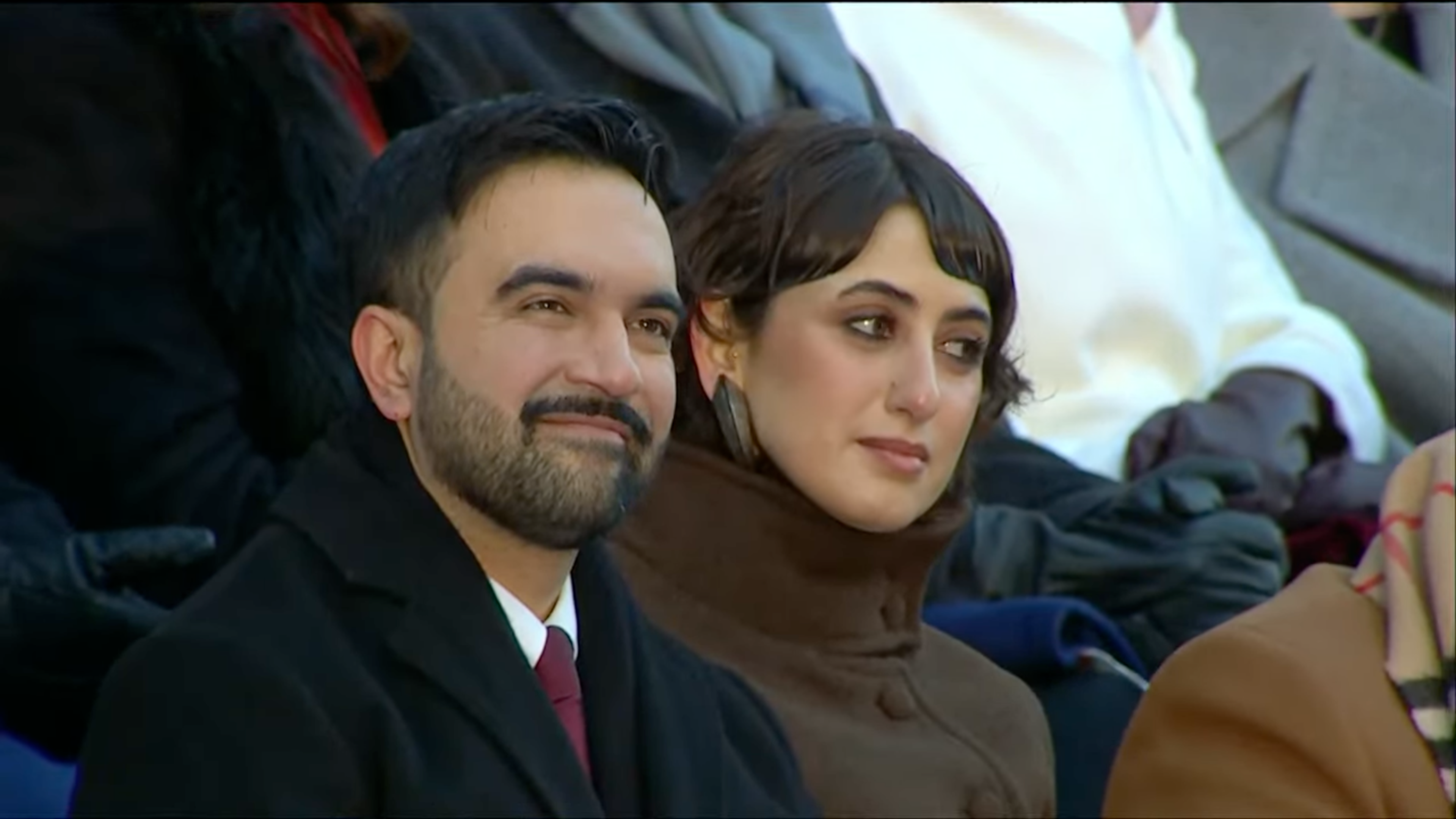
Mamdani and his wife Rama Duwaji at his mayoral inauguration

Mamdani is a dual citizen of Uganda and the United States (naturalized in 2018). He follows the Twelver branch of Shia Islam. In 2021, Mamdani met animator and illustrator Rama Duwaji through Hinge, an online dating application. They became engaged in October 2024, held a private nikah ceremony two months later in Dubai, and were married in February 2025 in a civil ceremony at New York City Hall; they also had a ceremony in Uganda in July 2025. The couple resided in Mamdani's legislative district of Astoria, Queens, near Steinway Street, until they moved into Gracie Mansion.

Besides English, Mamdani can speak at least five other languages with varying degrees of proficiency: Hindi, Swahili, Luganda, Spanish, and Arabic. He is a fan of the Premier League team Arsenal, the New York Knicks of the NBA, whose games he has attended as part of past campaigns, the New York Giants of the NFL, and the New York Mets of MLB. He also follows cricket and professional wrestling. He is a shareholder of the Spanish soccer team Real Oviedo, having been one of 20,000 people to purchase shares in the club in 2012 as part of a fundraising drive to stave off bankruptcy.

== In popular culture ==
Mamdani was Google's top "People" trending search for 2025. His Wikipedia article was among the 10 most-read in 2025.

In the 51st season of Saturday Night Live, Ramy Youssef portrayed Mamdani in a sketch based on the second debate of the 2025 New York City mayoral election. Youssef reprised his role in 2026.

== See also ==
- Indians in the New York metropolitan area
- Islam in the United States
- List of Democratic Socialists of America public officeholders
- List of foreign politicians of Indian origin
- List of mayors of the 50 largest cities in the United States
- List of polyglots
- List of socialist mayors in the United States
- Ugandan Americans

== Notes ==
Party political offices
Preceded by Eric Adams	Democratic nominee for Mayor of New York City; 2025	Most recent
Political offices
Preceded by Eric Adams	Mayor of New York City; 2026–present	Incumbent
