= New York's 36th State Assembly district =

American legislative district

Assemblymember
Diana Moreno; D–Astoria

New York's 36th State Assembly district is one of the 150 districts in the New York State Assembly. It has been represented by Diana Moreno since 2026.

== Geography ==
=== 2020s ===
District 36 is located in Queens. It encompasses most of western and central Astoria, and its neighborhoods, Ditmars and Astoria Heights. It also includes northern Long Island City.

The district overlaps (partially) with New York's 7th and 14th congressional districts, the 11th, 12th and 59th districts of the New York State Senate, and the 22nd and 26th districts of the New York City Council.

=== 2010s ===
District 36 is located in Queens. It encompasses Astoria, and its neighborhoods, Ditmars and Astoria Heights.

== Recent election results ==
=== 2026 general ===
2026 New York State Assembly election, District 36
Primary election
Party	Candidate	Votes	%
Democratic	Diana Moreno (incumbent)	9,386	78.4
Democratic	Mary Jobaida	2,045	17.1
Democratic	Kevin Coenen	490	4.1
Write-in		55	0.4
Total votes		11,976	100.0
General election
Democratic	Diana Moreno		
Working Families	Diana Moreno		
Total	Diana Moreno (incumbent)		
Republican	Edward Lee		
Write-in			
Total votes			100.0

=== 2026 special ===
Incumbent Zohran Mamdani resigned his seat on December 31, 2025 to serve as Mayor of New York City, triggering a special election. In special elections for state legislative offices, primaries are usually not held – county committee members and district leaders for each party select nominees.

2026 New York State Assembly special election, District 36
Party	Candidate	Votes	%
Democratic	Diana Moreno	3,389	
Working Families	Diana Moreno	3,083	
Total	Diana Moreno	6,472	74.1
Queens For All	Rana Abdelhamid	1,491	17.1
People First	Mary Jobaida	665	7.6
Write-in		106	1.2
Total votes		8,734	100.0
Democratic hold			

=== 2024 ===
2024 New York State Assembly election, District 36
Party	Candidate	Votes	%
Democratic	Zohran Mamdani	30,161	
Working Families	Zohran Mamdani	7,750	
Total	Zohran Mamdani (incumbent)	37,911	98.5
Write-in		596	1.5
Total votes		38,507	100.0
Democratic hold			

=== 2022 ===
2022 New York State Assembly election, District 36
Party	Candidate	Votes	%
Democratic	Zohran Mamdani	18,636	
Working Families	Zohran Mamdani	5,454	
Total	Zohran Mamdani (incumbent)	24,090	98.6
Write-in		338	1.4
Total votes		24,428	100.0
Democratic hold			

=== 2020 ===
2020 New York State Assembly election, District 36
Primary election
Party	Candidate	Votes	%
Democratic	Zohran Mamdani	8,410	51.2
Democratic	Aravella Simotas (incumbent)	7,987	48.6
Write-in		30	0.2
Total votes		16,427	100.0
General election
Democratic	Zohran Mamdani	38,221	98.5
Write-in		597	1.5
Total votes		38,818	100.0
Democratic hold			

=== 2018 ===
2018 New York State Assembly election, District 36
Party	Candidate	Votes	%
Democratic	Aravella Simotas	27,364	
Working Families	Aravella Simotas	2,580	
Total	Aravella Simotas (incumbent)	29,944	99.4
Write-in		194	0.6
Total votes		30,138	100.0
Democratic hold			

=== 2016 ===
2016 New York State Assembly election, District 36
Party	Candidate	Votes	%
Democratic	Aravella Simotas	32,574	
Working Families	Aravella Simotas	3,638	
Total	Aravella Simotas (incumbent)	36,212	99.5
Write-in		192	0.5
Total votes		36,404	100.0
Democratic hold			

=== 2014 ===
2014 New York State Assembly election, District 36
Party	Candidate	Votes	%
Democratic	Aravella Simotas	9,203	
Working Families	Aravella Simotas	1,837	
Total	Aravella Simotas (incumbent)	11,040	99.1
Write-in		102	0.9
Total votes		11,142	100.0
Democratic hold			

=== 2012 ===
2012 New York State Assembly election, District 36
Party	Candidate	Votes	%
Democratic	Aravella Simotas	24,724	
Working Families	Aravella Simotas	1,607	
Total	Aravella Simotas (incumbent)	26,331	84.0
Republican	Julia Haich	4,993	15.9
Write-in		31	0.1
Total votes		31,355	100.0
Democratic hold			

=== 2010 ===
2010 New York State Assembly election, District 36
Party	Candidate	Votes	%
Democratic	Aravella Simotas	11,501	
Working Families	Aravella Simotas	1,432	
Total	Aravella Simotas	12,933	99.4
Write-in		74	0.6
Total votes		13,007	100.0
Democratic hold			

=== 2008 ===
2008 New York State Assembly election, District 36
Party	Candidate	Votes	%
Democratic	Michael Gianaris	22,886	
Working Families	Michael Gianaris	1,318	
Total	Michael Gianaris (incumbent)	24,204	100.0
Write-in		2	0.0
Total votes		24,206	100.0
Democratic hold			

=== 2006 ===
2006 New York State Assembly election, District 36
Party	Candidate	Votes	%
Democratic	Michael Gianaris	11,540	
Working Families	Michael Gianaris	1,035	
Total	Michael Gianaris (incumbent)	12,575	100.0
Write-in		3	0.0
Total votes		12,578	100.0
Democratic hold			

=== 2004 ===
2004 New York State Assembly election, District 36
Party	Candidate	Votes	%
Democratic	Michael Gianaris	21,013	
Working Families	Michael Gianaris	1,179	
Total	Michael Gianaris (incumbent)	22,192	100.0
Write-in		3	0.0
Total votes		22,195	100.0
Democratic hold			

=== 2002 ===
2002 New York State Assembly election, District 36
Party	Candidate	Votes	%
Democratic	Michael Gianaris	8,711	
Working Families	Michael Gianaris	600	
Total	Michael Gianaris (incumbent)	9,311	93.3
Green	Gerald Kann	672	6.7
Write-in		1	0.0
Total votes		9,984	100.0
Democratic hold			

=== 2000 ===
2000 New York State Assembly election, District 36
Party	Candidate	Votes	%
Democratic	Michael Gianaris	20,288	72.1
Republican	Vincent Tabone	6,643	
Conservative	Vincent Tabone	516	
Right to Life	Vincent Tabone	337	
Total	Vincent Tabone	7,496	26.6
Independence	Molly Honigsfeld	355	1.3
Write-in		4	0.0
Total votes		28,143	100.0
Democratic hold			

=== Federal results in Assembly District 36 ===
Year	Office	Results
2024	President	Harris 73.3 - 23.9%
2024	Senate	Gillibrand 76.7 - 21.9%
2022	Senate	Schumer 79.9 - 19.3%
2020	President	Biden 75.5 - 23.0%
2018	Senate	Gillibrand 85.2 - 14.7%
2016	President	Clinton 77.0 - 18.6%
2016	Senate	Schumer 81.9 - 13.9%
2012	President	Obama 79.7 - 18.0%
2012	Senate	Gillibrand 83.9 - 13.6%
