= 2026 New York State Senate election =

- November 3, 2026

All 63 seats in the New York State Senate 32 seats needed for a majority
- Reporting: 93% as of Nov 8 at 1:47 PM EST
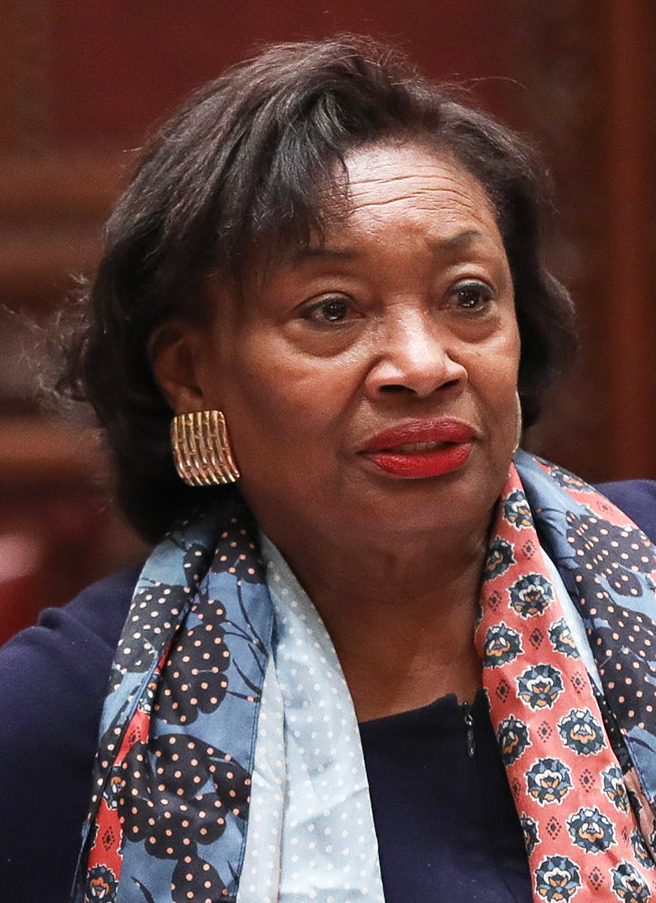

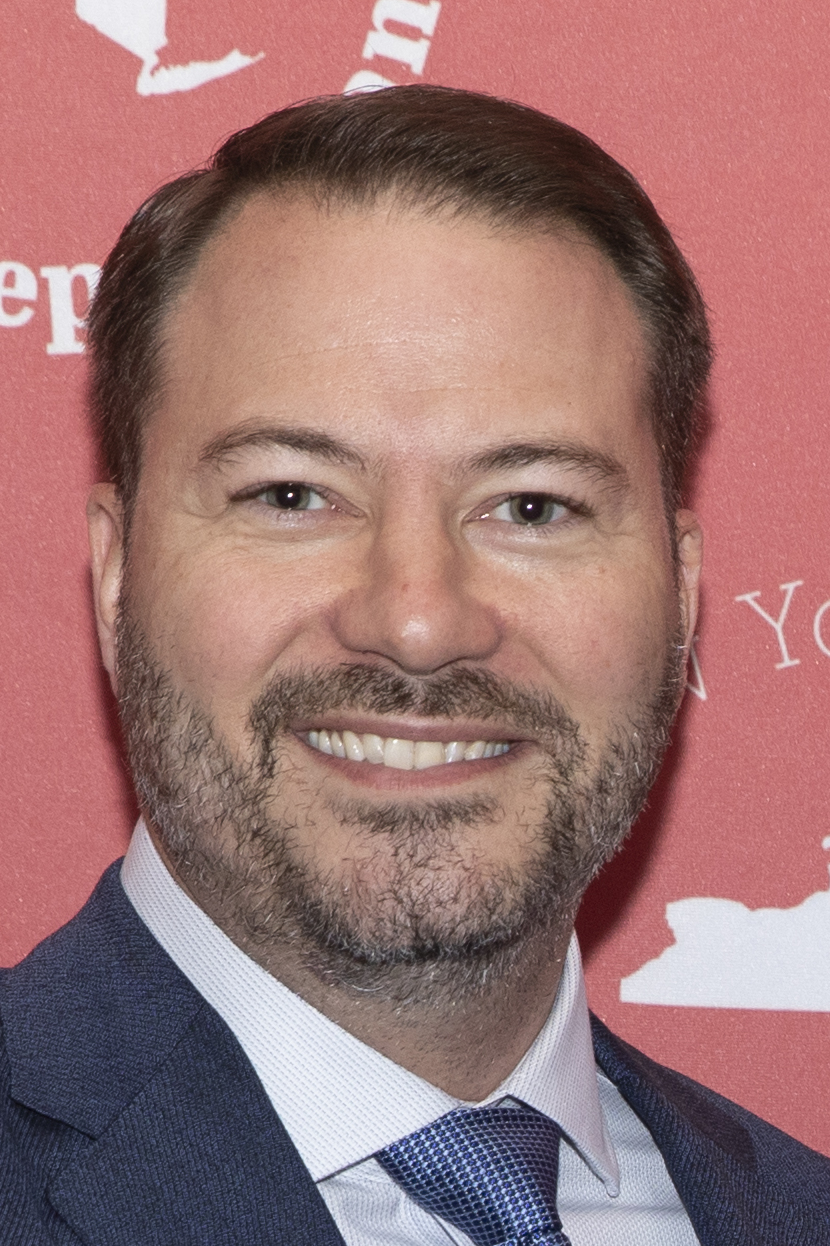
	Majority party	Minority party
Leader	Andrea Stewart-Cousins	Rob Ortt
Party	Democratic	Republican
Leader since	December 17, 2012	June 28, 2020
Leader's seat	35th-Yonkers	62nd-N. Tonawanda
Last election	41 seats, 50.8%	22, 40.2%
Seats won	48	15
Seat change	▲7	▼7
- Democratic hold Democratic gain Republican hold TBD Result
Temporary President and Majority Leader before election
Andrea Stewart-Cousins
Democratic
Elected Temporary President and Majority Leader
TBD

The 2026 New York State Senate election was held on November 3, 2026. Primary elections were held on June 23, 2026. It was held alongside elections for governor, attorney general, comptroller, United States House of Representatives, and State Assembly.

In the 2024 election, the Democratic Party retained its State Senate majority, but lost its veto-proof (two-thirds) majority after it lost one seat in the election for the 17th Senate district to Republican Steve Chan.

Candidates must have filed paperwork between March 30 and April 2, 2026, to run.

== Retirements ==
As of July 2026, 4 senators (1 Democrats and 3 Republicans) have announced their retirement, 1 of whom (Republican Peter Oberacker) is retiring to run for other offices.

=== Democrats ===
1. 27th district: Brian P. Kavanagh is retiring.

=== Republicans ===
1. 7th district: Jack Martins is retiring.
2. 8th district: Alexis Weik is retiring.
3. 51st district: Peter Oberacker is retiring to run for the U.S. House of Representatives.

== Incumbents defeated ==
=== In primary elections ===
==== Democrats ====
Two Democrats lost renomination.

1. 13th district: Jessica Ramos lost renomination to Jessica González-Rojas.
2. 61st district: Jeremy Zellner lost renomination to Jonathan Rivera.

== Special elections ==
There are three special elections for the 206th New York State Legislature, listed here by date and district. Under New York state law, vacancies in the state senate and other offices are filled by special elections, scheduled separately from the regular election cycle. The winners of these special elections will serve the remainder of the unexpired terms, and are expected to seek full terms in the 2026 general election.

District	Incumbent			This race	
District	Member	Party	First elected	Results	Candidates
22	Simcha Felder	Democratic	2012	Incumbent resigned April 9, 2025, to become a New York City councilman. New member elected May 20, 2025. Democratic hold.	▌ ✓ Sam Sutton (Democratic) 67.0%; ▌▌Nachman Carl Caller (Republican) 31.9%
47	Brad Hoylman-Sigal	Democratic	2012	Incumbent resigned December 31, 2025, to become Manhattan borough president. New member elected February 3, 2026. Democratic hold.	▌▌ ✓ Erik Bottcher (Democratic) 91.7%; ▌Charlotte Friedman (Republican) 7.7%
61	Sean Ryan	Democratic	2020	Incumbent resigned December 31, 2025, to become mayor of Buffalo. New member elected February 3, 2026. Democratic hold.	▌ ✓ Jeremy Zellner (Democratic) 59.7%; ▌▌Dan R. Gagliardo (Republican) 39.8%

=== 2025 ===
One state senate seat became vacant during the 206th New York State Legislature due to resignations following election to other offices.

A special election for district 22 was held on May 20, 2025. Party nominations were made by county party committees, rather than through primary elections.

==== District 22 ====
In 2024, incumbent Democratic senator Simcha Felder, who caucused with the Republican Party until 2019, won re-election to a seventh term with 99.09% of the vote. On April 9, 2025, he resigned from the state senate to become the New York City Council member for the 44th district after winning a special election on March 25. On May 20, Democrat Sam Sutton won the special election with 57.03% of the vote against Republican Nachman Carl Caller to succeed Felder. Sutton was sworn in on May 27.

2025 New York State Senate special election, District 22
Party	Candidate	Votes	%
Democratic	Sam Sutton	8,970	67.0
Republican	Nachman Carl Caller	3,736	27.9
Conservative	Nachman Carl Caller	536	4.0
Total	Nachman Carl Caller	4,272	31.9
Write-in		140	1.0
Total votes		13,382	100.0
Democratic hold			

=== 2026 ===
Two state senate seats became vacant during the 206th New York State Legislature due to resignations following election to other offices. Under New York state law, these vacancies are filled by special elections, scheduled separately from the regular election cycle. The winners of these special elections will serve the remainder of the unexpired terms, and are expected to seek full terms in the 2026 general election.

Special elections for State Senate districts 47 and 61 were held on February 3, 2026. Party nominations were made by county party committees, rather than through primary elections.

==== District 47 ====
The seat became vacant after Senator Brad Hoylman-Sigal resigned effective December 31, 2025, following his election as Manhattan borough president.

Erik Bottcher was selected as the Democratic nominee by the district's membership of the New York County party committee, whose special nomination meeting took place on January 11, 2026. The Republican nominee was originally Kevin O'Connell, later replaced by Charlotte Friedman. Bottcher won the special election and assumed office on February 4, 2026.

2026 New York State Senate special election, District 47
Party	Candidate	Votes	%
Democratic	Erik Bottcher	11,076	76.2
Working Families	Erik Bottcher	2,249	15.5
Total	Erik Bottcher	13,325	91.7
Republican	Charlotte Friedman	1,117	7.7
Write-in		96	0.7
Total votes		14,538	100.0
Democratic hold			

==== District 61 ====
The seat for the 61st district became vacant after Senator Sean Ryan resigned effective January 1, 2026, following his election as mayor of Buffalo.

Assemblymember Jon Rivera had made his intentions to seek the seat before Ryan's resignation, and formally announced his candidacy on October 9, 2025. Erie County Democratic chair Jeremy Zellner announced his candidacy on January 5, 2026. Zellner was nominated by the party as their official candidate. The Republicans and Conservatives nominated perennial candidate Dan Gagliardo. Zellner won the election and assumed office on February 4, 2026.

2026 New York State Senate special election, District 61
Party	Candidate	Votes	%
Democratic	Jeremy Zellner	19,341	59.7
Republican	Dan R. Gagliardo	9,853	30.4
Conservative	Dan R. Gagliardo	3,033	9.4
Total	Dan R. Gagliardo	12,886	39.8
Write-in		175	0.5
Total votes		32,402	100.0
Democratic hold			

== Predictions ==
Source	Ranking	As of
Sabato's Crystal Ball	Safe D	January 22, 2026
State Navigate	Safe D	September 09, 2026

== Summary by district ==
District		Incumbent				Candidates (Note: Candidates in the 1st–4th districts file with the Suffolk County Board of Elections, candidates in the 5th–7th and 9th districts file with the Nassau County Board of Elections, candidates in the 8th, 34th, 36th, 39th–41st, 43rd–46th, 48th–54th, 57th–58th, and 62nd districts file with the State Board of Elections, candidates in the 10th–33rd, 47th, and 59th districts file with the New York City Board of Elections, candidates in the 35th and 37th districts file with the Westchester County Board of Elections, candidates in the 38th district file with the Rockland County Board of Elections, candidates in the 42nd district file with the Orange County Board of Elections, candidates in the 55th–56th district file with the Monroe County Board of Elections, and candidates in the 60th–61st and 63rd district file with the Erie County Board of Elections.)
Location	2024 Pres.	Member	Party	First elected	Status	Candidates
1	R+1.5	Anthony Palumbo	Republican	2020	Incumbent lost re-election. Democratic gain.	▌▌ ✓ Chris Murray (Democratic); ▌▌Anthony Palumbo (Republican)
2	R+10.8	Mario Mattera	Republican	2020	Incumbent re-elected.	▌▌ ✓ Mario Mattera (Republican); ▌Harjot Singh (Democratic)
3	R+17.9	Dean Murray	Republican	2022	Incumbent re-elected.	▌▌ ✓ Dean Murray (Republican); ▌Antonio Vargas-Ayala (Democratic)
4	D+6.4	Monica Martinez	Democratic	2018; 2020 (lost); 2022	Incumbent re-elected.	▌▌ ✓ Monica Martinez (Democratic); ▌▌Brianne R. Wakefield (Republican)
5	R+15.9	Steven Rhoads	Republican	2022	Incumbent re-elected.	▌▌ ✓ Steven Rhoads (Republican); ▌Andrew Piddoubny (Democratic)
6	D+23.3	Siela Bynoe	Democratic	2024	Incumbent re-elected.	▌▌ ✓ Siela Bynoe (Democratic); ▌▌Matthew J. Capp (Republican)
7	R+4.1	Jack Martins	Republican	2010; 2016 (retired); 2022	Incumbent retiring.	▌▌ ✓ Jake Blumencranz (Republican); ▌Rory Lancman (Democratic)
8	R+27.4	Alexis Weik	Republican	2020	Incumbent retiring. Republican hold.	▌▌ ✓ Jarett Gandolfo (Republican); ▌Josh Taveras (Democratic)
9	R+4.1	Patricia Canzoneri-Fitzpatrick	Republican	2022	Incumbent lost re-election. Democratic gain.	▌ ✓ Lisa Vider (Democratic); ▌▌Patricia Canzoneri-Fitzpatrick (Republican)
10	D+39.2	James Sanders Jr.	Democratic	2012	Incumbent re-elected.	▌▌ ✓ James Sanders Jr. (Democratic)
11	D+9.0	Toby Ann Stavisky	Democratic	1999 (special)	Incumbent re-elected.	▌ ✓ Toby Ann Stavisky (Democratic); ▌▌Pamela H. Michos (Republican)
12	D+22.1	Vacant			Michael Gianaris (D) resigned August 7, 2026. Democratic hold.	▌ ✓ Aber Kawas (Democratic); ▌Han-Khon To (Republican)
13	D+18.2	Jessica Ramos	Democratic	2018	Incumbent lost renomination. Democratic hold.	▌▌ ✓ Jessica González-Rojas (Democratic); ▌John Healy (Republican)
14	D+52.8	Leroy Comrie	Democratic	2014	Incumbent re-elected.	▌ ✓ Leroy Comrie (Democratic)
15	D+3.1	Joseph Addabbo Jr.	Democratic	2008	Incumbent re-elected.	▌ ✓ Joseph Addabbo Jr. (Democratic)
16	D+0.5	John Liu	Democratic	2018	Incumbent re-elected.	▌▌ ✓ John Liu (Democratic)
17	R+14.5	Steve Chan	Republican	2024	Incumbent lost re-election. Democratic gain.	▌ ✓ Larry He (Democratic); ▌▌Steve Chan (Republican)
18	D+48.0	Julia Salazar	Democratic	2018	Incumbent re-elected.	▌▌ ✓ Julia Salazar (Democratic)
19	D+70.5	Roxanne Persaud	Democratic	2015 (special)	Incumbent re-elected.	▌ ✓ Roxanne Persaud (Democratic)
20	D+76.2	Zellnor Myrie	Democratic	2018	Incumbent re-elected.	▌▌ ✓ Zellnor Myrie (Democratic)
21	D+51.1	Kevin Parker	Democratic	2002	Incumbent re-elected.	▌ ✓ Kevin Parker (Democratic); ▌▌Ronald Seifert (Republican)
22	R+55.0	Sam Sutton	Democratic	2025 (special)	Incumbent re-elected.	▌ ✓ Sam Sutton (Democratic); ▌▌Nachman Carl Caller (Republican)
23	R+3.5	Jessica Scarcella-Spanton	Democratic	2022	Incumbent re-elected.	▌ ✓ Jessica Scarcella-Spanton (Democratic); ▌▌Ruslan Shamal (Republican)
24	R+45.2	Andrew Lanza	Republican	2006	Incumbent re-elected.	▌▌ ✓ Andrew Lanza (Republican); ▌Alexis Rodriguez (Democratic)
25	D+79.8	Jabari Brisport	Democratic	2020	Incumbent re-elected.	▌▌ ✓ Jabari Brisport (Democratic)
26	D+54.4	Andrew Gounardes	Democratic	2018	Incumbent re-elected.	▌▌ ✓ Andrew Gounardes (Democratic); ▌▌Tom Stanten (Republican)
27	D+60.3	Brian P. Kavanagh	Democratic	2017 (special)	Incumbent retiring. Democratic hold.	▌ ✓ Grace Lee (Democratic); ▌▌Jason Murillo (Republican); ▌Yuh-Line Niou (Working Families)
28	D+55.8	Liz Krueger	Democratic	2002 (special)	Incumbent re-elected.	▌ ✓ Liz Krueger (Democratic); ▌Alina Bonsell (Republican)
29	D+55.9	José M. Serrano	Democratic	2004	Incumbent re-elected.	▌▌ ✓ José M. Serrano (Democratic)
30	D+75.0	Cordell Cleare	Democratic	2021 (special)	Incumbent re-elected.	▌▌ ✓ Cordell Cleare (Democratic)
31	D+45.9	Robert Jackson	Democratic	2018	Incumbent re-elected.	▌▌ ✓ Robert Jackson (Democratic)
32	D+47.5	Luis R. Sepúlveda	Democratic	2018 (special)	Incumbent re-elected.	▌ ✓ Luis R. Sepúlveda (Democratic)
33	D+38.8	Gustavo Rivera	Democratic	2010	Incumbent re-elected.	▌▌ ✓ Gustavo Rivera (Democratic)
34	D+30.8	Nathalia Fernandez	Democratic	2022	Incumbent re-elected.	▌▌ ✓ Nathalia Fernandez (Democratic); ▌Adrian Romero (Conservative)
35	D+25.1	Andrea Stewart-Cousins	Democratic	2006	Incumbent re-elected.	▌▌ ✓ Andrea Stewart-Cousins (Democratic); ▌Anthony Merante (Republican)
36	D+65.4	Jamaal Bailey	Democratic	2016	Incumbent re-elected.	▌ ✓ Jamaal Bailey (Democratic); ▌Grace Marrero (Conservative)
37	D+22.7	Shelley Mayer	Democratic	2018 (special)	Incumbent re-elected.	▌▌ ✓ Shelley Mayer (Democratic); ▌Thomas Fix Jr. (Republican)
38	R+11.1	Bill Weber	Republican	2022	Incumbent lost re-election. Democratic gain.	▌▌ ✓ Joseph Rand (Democratic); ▌Bill Weber (Republican)
39	D+4.1	Robert Rolison	Republican	2022	Incumbent lost re-election. Democratic gain.	▌ ✓ Lisa Kaul (Democratic); ▌▌Robert Rolison (Republican); ▌Evan R. Menist (Working Families)
40	D+8.8	Peter Harckham	Democratic	2018	Incumbent re-elected.	▌▌ ✓ Peter Harckham (Democratic); ▌▌Sergio Esposito (Republican)
41	D+11.8	Michelle Hinchey	Democratic	2020	Incumbent re-elected.	▌▌ ✓ Michelle Hinchey (Democratic); ▌▌Patrick Sheehan (Republican)
42	R+11.5	James Skoufis	Democratic	2018	Incumbent re-elected.	▌▌ ✓ James Skoufis (Democratic); ▌Jennifer R. Figueroa (Republican); ▌Joshua Blumenthal (Conservative)
43	D+3.1	Jake Ashby	Republican	2022	Incumbent lost re-election. Democratic gain.	▌▌ ✓ Devin Lander (Democratic); ▌▌Jake Ashby (Republican)
44	D+7.6	Jim Tedisco	Republican	2016	Incumbent lost re-election. Democratic gain.	▌▌ ✓ Sarah Rogerson (Democratic); ▌▌Jim Tedisco (Republican)
45	R+6.4	Dan Stec	Republican	2020	Incumbent re-elected.	▌▌ ✓ Dan Stec (Republican); ▌▌Melissa Seale (Democratic)
46	D+14.9	Patricia Fahy	Democratic	2024	Incumbent re-elected.	▌▌ ✓ Patricia Fahy (Democratic); ▌▌Martha McHugh (Republican)
47	D+70.9	Erik Bottcher	Democratic	2026 (special)	Incumbent re-elected.	▌▌ ✓ Erik Bottcher (Democratic); ▌Charlotte Friedman (Republican); ▌Emily YueXin Miller (Conservative)
48	D+14.0	Rachel May	Democratic	2018	Incumbent re-elected.	▌▌ ✓ Rachel May (Democratic); ▌▌Richard McCarron Jr. (Republican)
49	R+32.5	Mark Walczyk	Republican	2022	Incumbent re-elected.	▌▌ ✓ Mark Walczyk (Republican); ▌▌Cassie Robbins-Forbus (Democratic)
50	D+4.2	Chris Ryan	Democratic	2024	Incumbent re-elected.	▌▌ ✓ Chris Ryan (Democratic); ▌▌James Corl (Republican)
51	R+14.5	Peter Oberacker	Republican	2020	Incumbent retiring. Republican hold.	▌▌ ✓ Christopher Tague (Republican); ▌▌Michele Frazier (Democratic)
52	D+19.0	Lea Webb	Democratic	2022	Incumbent re-elected.	▌▌ ✓ Lea Webb (Democratic); ▌▌Michael Bolles (Republican)
53	R+20.6	Joseph Griffo	Republican	2006	Incumbent re-elected.	▌▌ ✓ Joseph Griffo (Republican); ▌▌Mandi Drake (Democratic)
54	R+10.7	Pam Helming	Republican	2016	Incumbent re-elected.	▌▌ ✓ Pam Helming (Republican); ▌Michael Mills (Democratic)
55	D+28.3	Samra Brouk	Democratic	2020	Incumbent re-elected.	▌▌ ✓ Samra Brouk (Democratic); ▌▌Chris Brown (Republican)
56	D+22.4	Jeremy Cooney	Democratic	2020	Incumbent re-elected.	▌▌ ✓ Jeremy Cooney (Democratic); ▌▌Orlando Rivera (Republican)
57	R+31.8	George Borrello	Republican	2019 (special)	Incumbent re-elected.	▌▌ ✓ George Borrello (Republican); ▌▌Victoria Guite-Williams (Democratic)
58	R+23.0	Tom O'Mara	Republican	2010	Incumbent re-elected.	▌▌ ✓ Tom O'Mara (Republican); ▌James Bobreski (Democratic)
59	D+61.1	Kristen Gonzalez	Democratic	2022	Incumbent re-elected.	▌▌ ✓ Kristen Gonzalez (Democratic)
60	R+13.4	Patrick M. Gallivan	Republican	2010	Incumbent re-elected.	▌▌ ✓ Patrick M. Gallivan (Republican)
61	D+21.7	Jeremy Zellner	Democratic	2026 (special)	Incumbent lost renomination. Democratic hold.	▌▌ ✓ Jonathan Rivera (Democratic)
62	R+19.1	Rob Ortt	Republican	2014	Incumbent re-elected.	▌▌ ✓ Rob Ortt (Republican); ▌▌Thomas Arida (Democratic)
63	D+31.9	April Baskin	Democratic	2024	Incumbent re-elected.	▌▌ ✓ April Baskin (Democratic); ▌▌Geoffrey Szymanski (Republican)

== District 1 ==
2026 New York's 1st State Senate district election
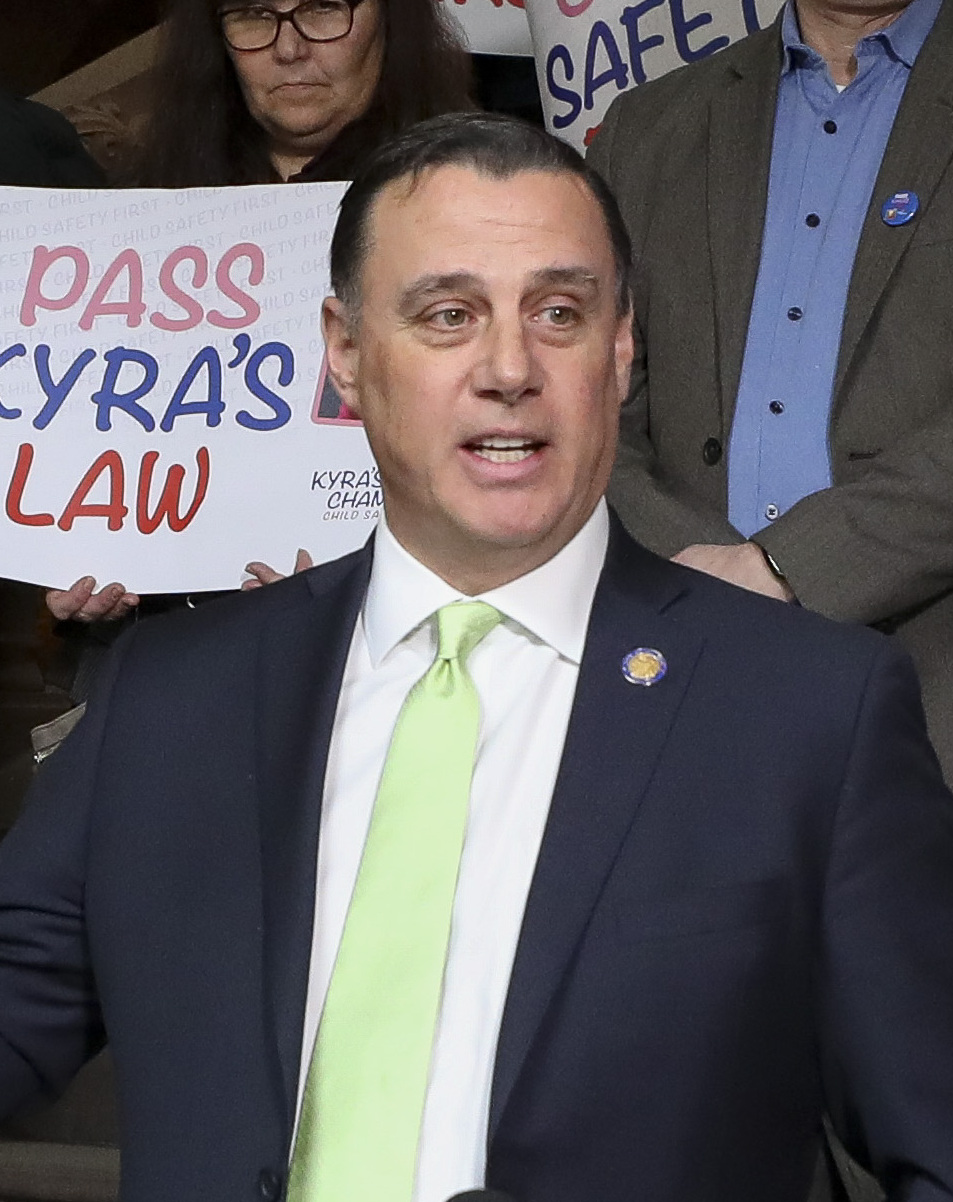

Nominee	Anthony Palumbo	Chris Murray
Party	Republican	Democratic
Alliance	Conservative	Working Families
Incumbent Senator
Anthony Palumbo
Republican

The 1st district is based on the eastern end and North Shore of Long Island, including the towns of East Hampton, Southold, Shelter Island, Southampton, and Riverhead, as well as some of eastern Brookhaven, all in Suffolk County. The incumbent is Republican Anthony Palumbo, who was re-elected to a third term with 52.93% of the vote in 2024.

=== Republican primary ===
==== Nominee ====
- Anthony Palumbo, incumbent senator

=== Democratic primary ===
==== Nominee ====
- E. Christopher Murray

==== Withdrawn or disqualified ====
- Farzeen Bham, candidate for New York State Senate in 2022

==== Endorsements ====
Christopher Murray

Political parties

- New York Working Families Party

== District 2 ==
2026 New York's 2nd State Senate district election
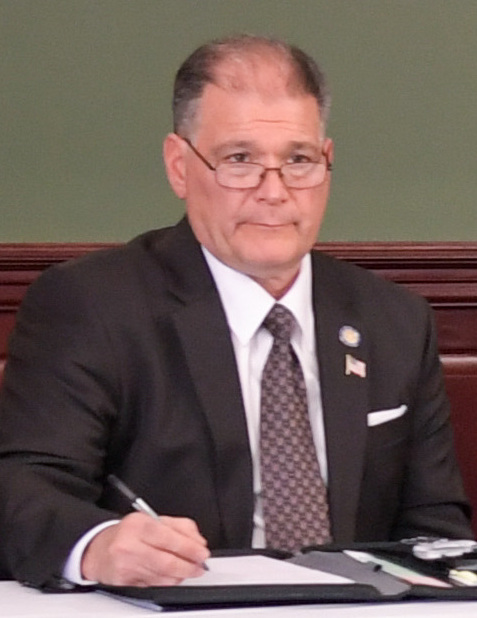

Nominee	Mario Mattera	Harjot Singh
Party	Republican	Democratic
Alliance	Conservative
Incumbent Senator
Mario Mattera
Republican

The 2nd district is based on the North Shore of Long Island, including the towns of Smithtown and Huntington, all in Suffolk County. The incumbent is Republican Mario Mattera, who was re-elected to a third term with 58.25% of the vote in 2024.

=== Republican primary ===
==== Nominee ====
- Mario Mattera, incumbent senator

=== Democratic primary ===
==== Nominee ====
- Harjot Singh

==== Withdrawn or disqualified ====
- Jonathan D. Estreich (running for Suffolk County comptroller)

== District 3 ==
2026 New York's 3rd State Senate district election
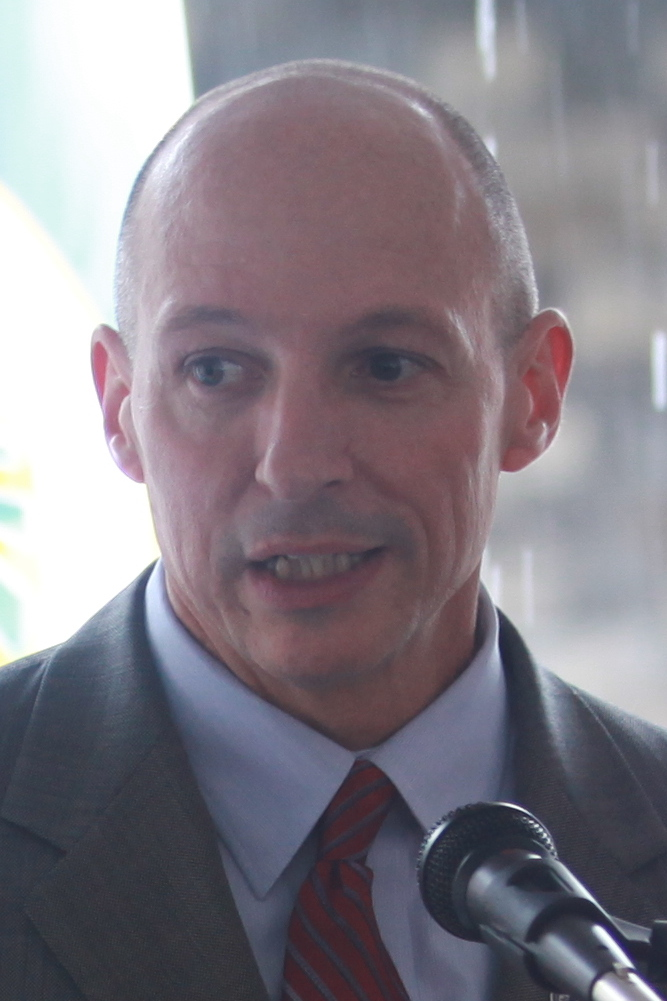

Nominee	Dean Murray	Antonio Vargas-Ayala
Party	Republican	Democratic
Alliance	Conservative
Incumbent Senator
Dean Murray
Republican

The 3rd district is based on the South Shore of Long Island, including portions of Brookhaven, Islip, and Brentwood, all in Suffolk County. The incumbent is Republican Dean Murray, who was re-elected to a second term with 61.47% of the vote in 2024.

=== Republican primary ===
==== Nominee ====
- Dean Murray, incumbent senator

=== Democratic primary ===
==== Nominee ====
- Antonio Vargas-Ayala

==== Endorsements ====
Antonio Vargas-Ayala

Political parties

- New York Working Families Party

== District 4 ==
2026 New York's 4th State Senate district election
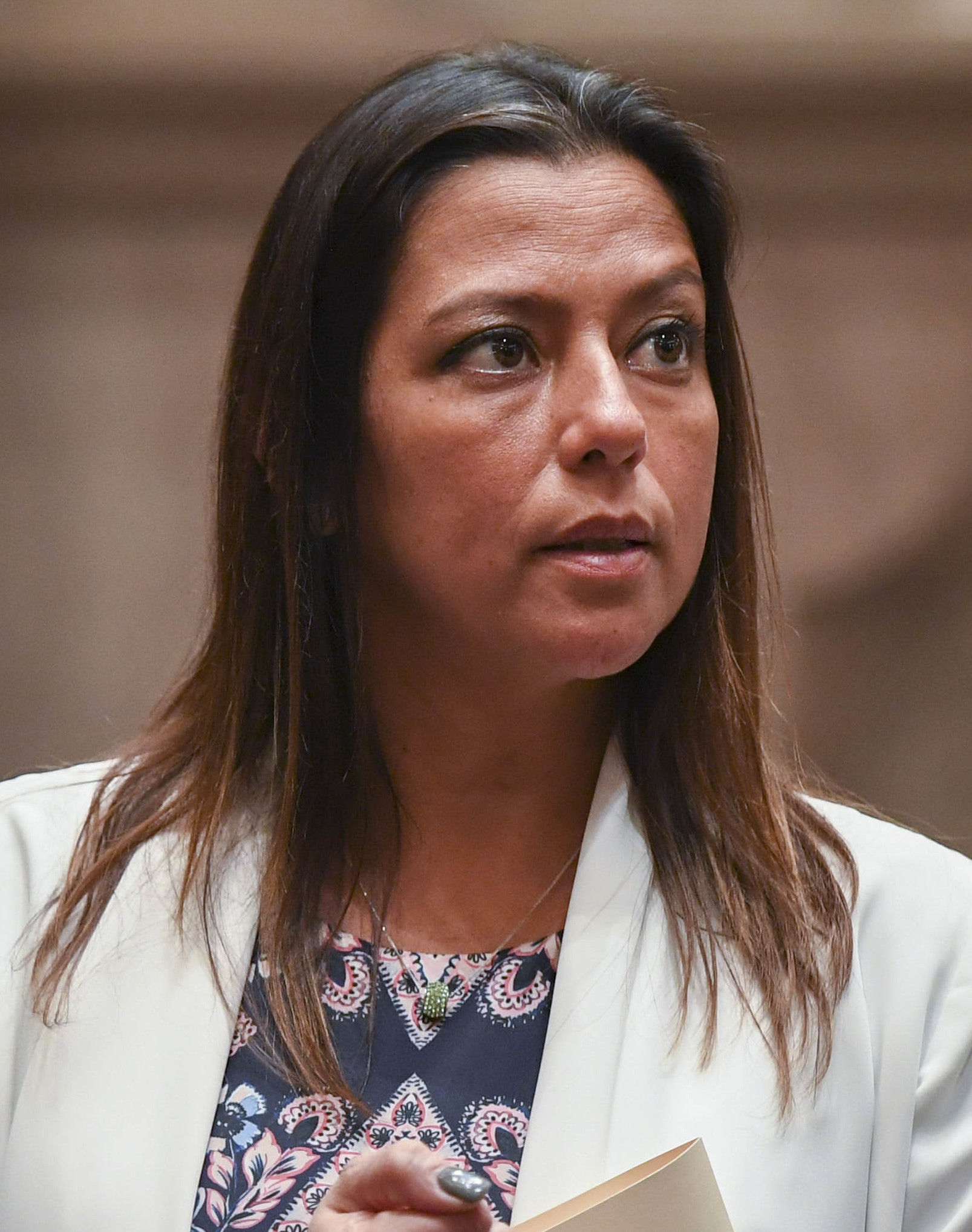

Nominee	Monica Martinez	Brianne R. Wakefield
Party	Democratic	Republican
Alliance	Working Families	Conservative
Incumbent Senator
Monica Martinez
Democratic

The 4th district is based on the South Shore of Long Island, including portions of Bay Shore, Brentwood, Central Islip, Deer Park, Islandia, North Babylon, West Babylon and Wyandanch, all in Suffolk County. The incumbent is Democrat Monica Martinez, who was re-elected to a second consecutive and third overall term with 56.46% of the vote in 2024.

=== Democratic primary ===
==== Nominee ====
- Monica Martinez, incumbent senator

==== Endorsements ====
Monica Martinez

Political parties

- New York Working Families Party

=== Republican primary ===
==== Nominee ====
- Brianne Wakefield, activist

== District 5 ==
2026 New York's 5th State Senate district election
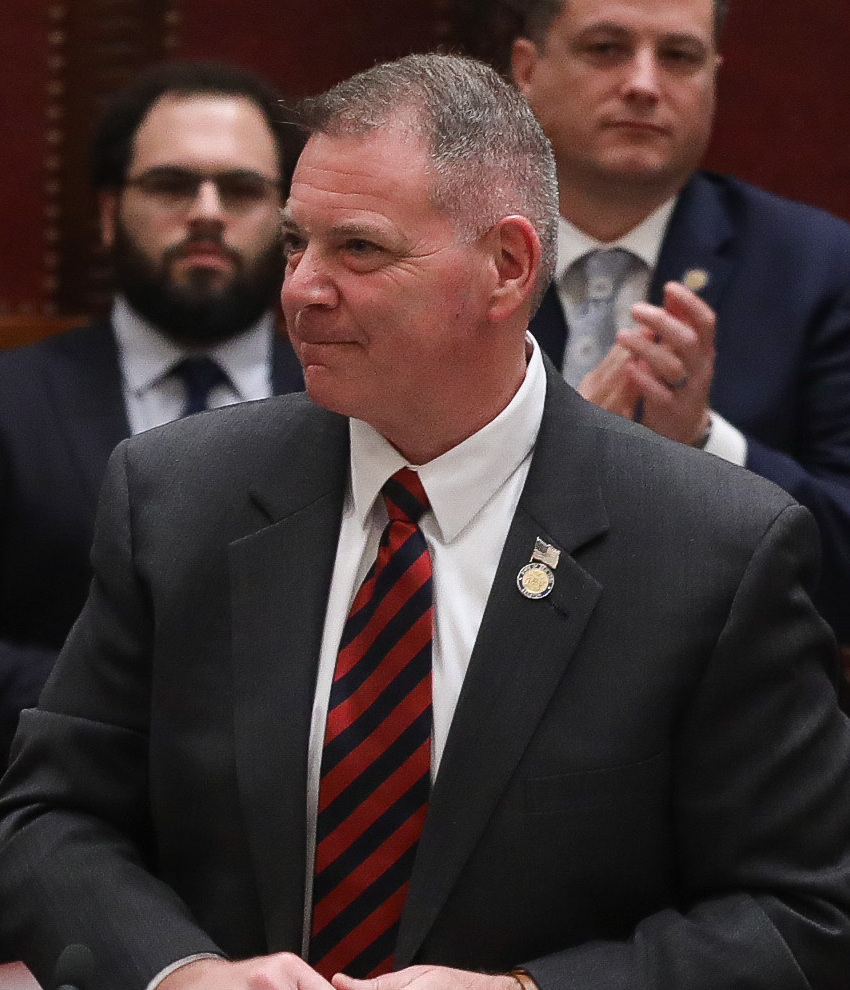

Nominee	Steven Rhoads	Andrew Piddoubny
Party	Republican	Democratic
Alliance	Conservative
Incumbent Senator
Steven Rhoads
Republican

The 5th district covers parts of Nassau and Suffolk counties in Long Island, including Glen Cove, Oyster Bay, and Northport. The incumbent is Republican Steven Rhoads, who was re-elected to a second term with 61.26% of the vote in 2024.

=== Republican primary ===
==== Nominee ====
- Steven Rhoads, incumbent senator

=== Democratic primary ===
==== Nominee ====
- Andrew Piddoubny, law clerk

== District 6 ==
2026 New York's 6th State Senate district election
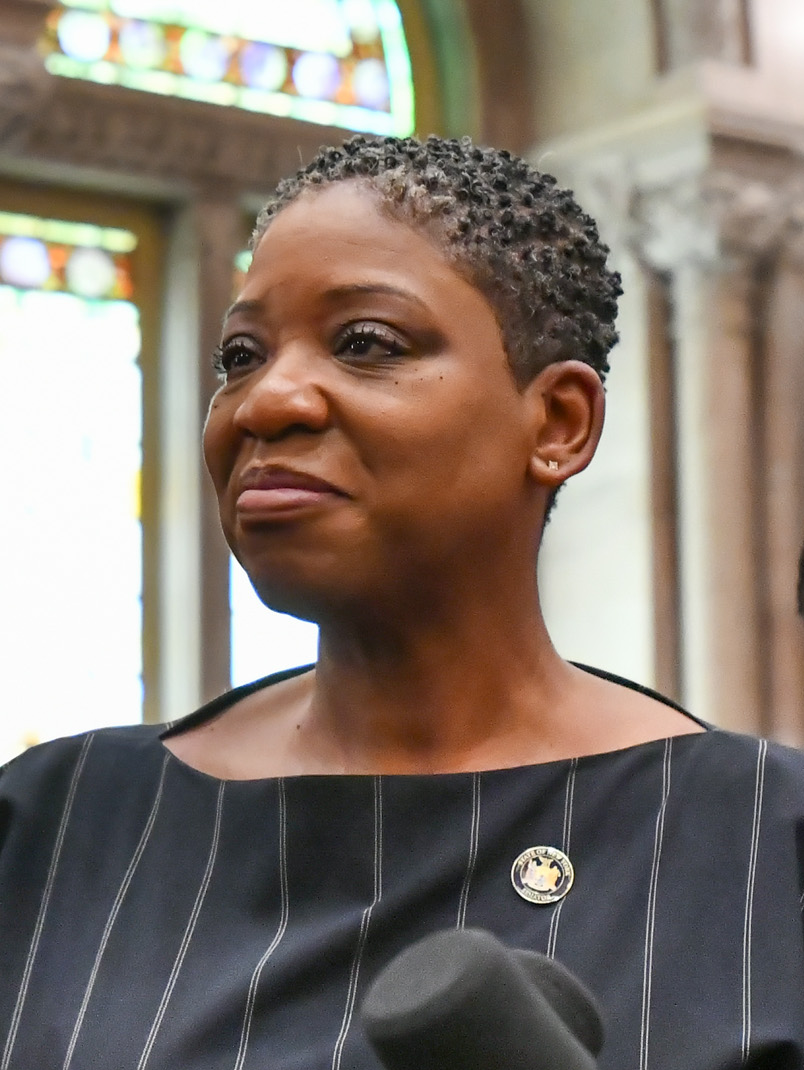

Nominee	Siela Bynoe	Matthew J. Capp
Party	Democratic	Republican
Alliance	Working Families	Conservative
Incumbent Senator
Siela Bynoe
Democratic

The 6th district covers central Nassau County in Long Island, including portions of the town of Hempstead including Hempstead village, Garden City, Uniondale, Freeport, and Baldwin, and southern North Hempstead including Westbury and New Cassel. The incumbent is Democrat Siela Bynoe, who was first elected with 60.83% of the vote in 2024.

=== Democratic primary ===
==== Nominee ====
- Siela Bynoe, incumbent senator

==== Endorsements ====
Siela Bynoe

Political parties

- New York Working Families Party

=== Republican primary ===
==== Nominee ====
- Matthew Capp, Hempstead press secretary

== District 7 ==
2026 New York's 7th State Senate district election
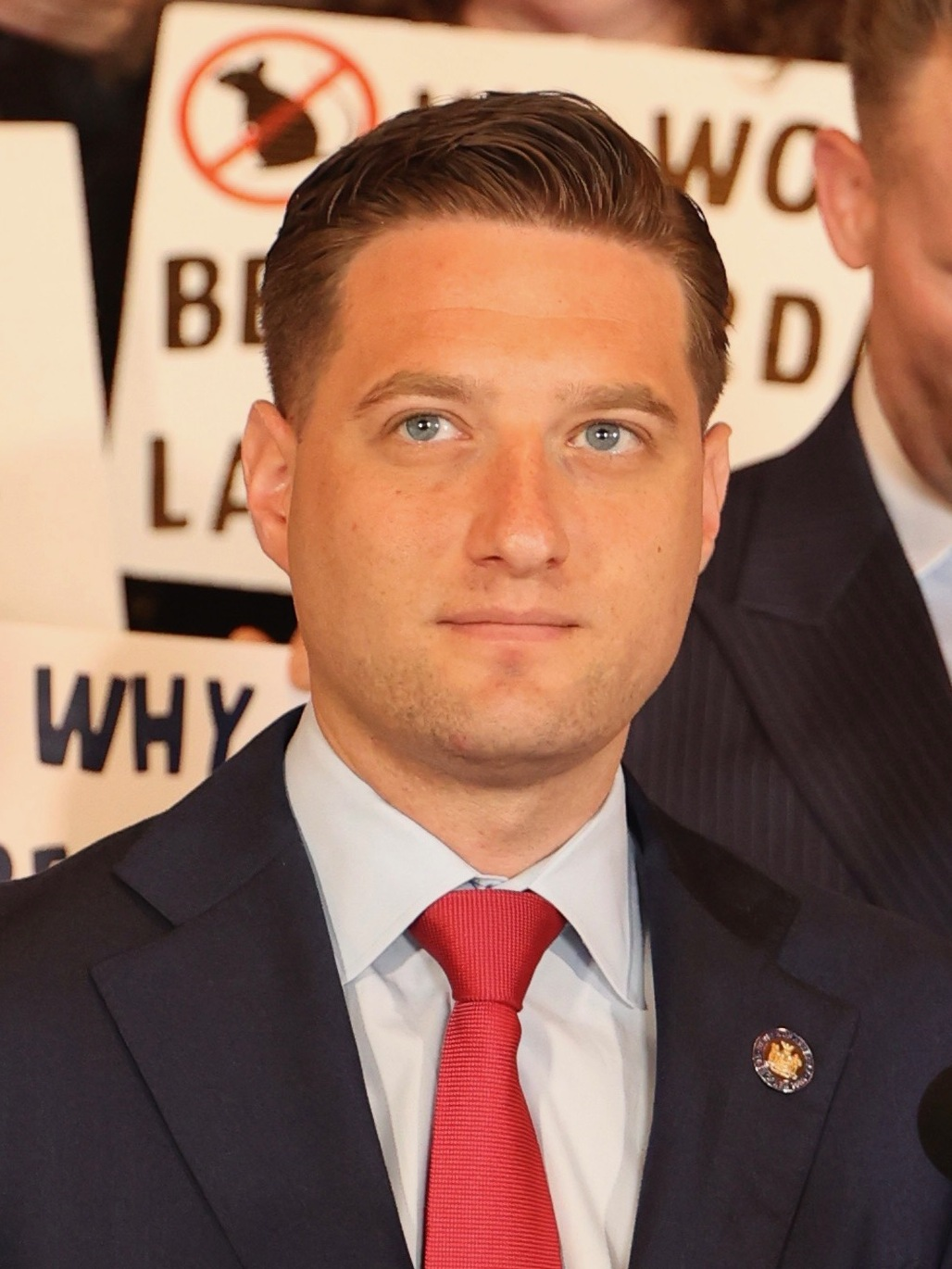

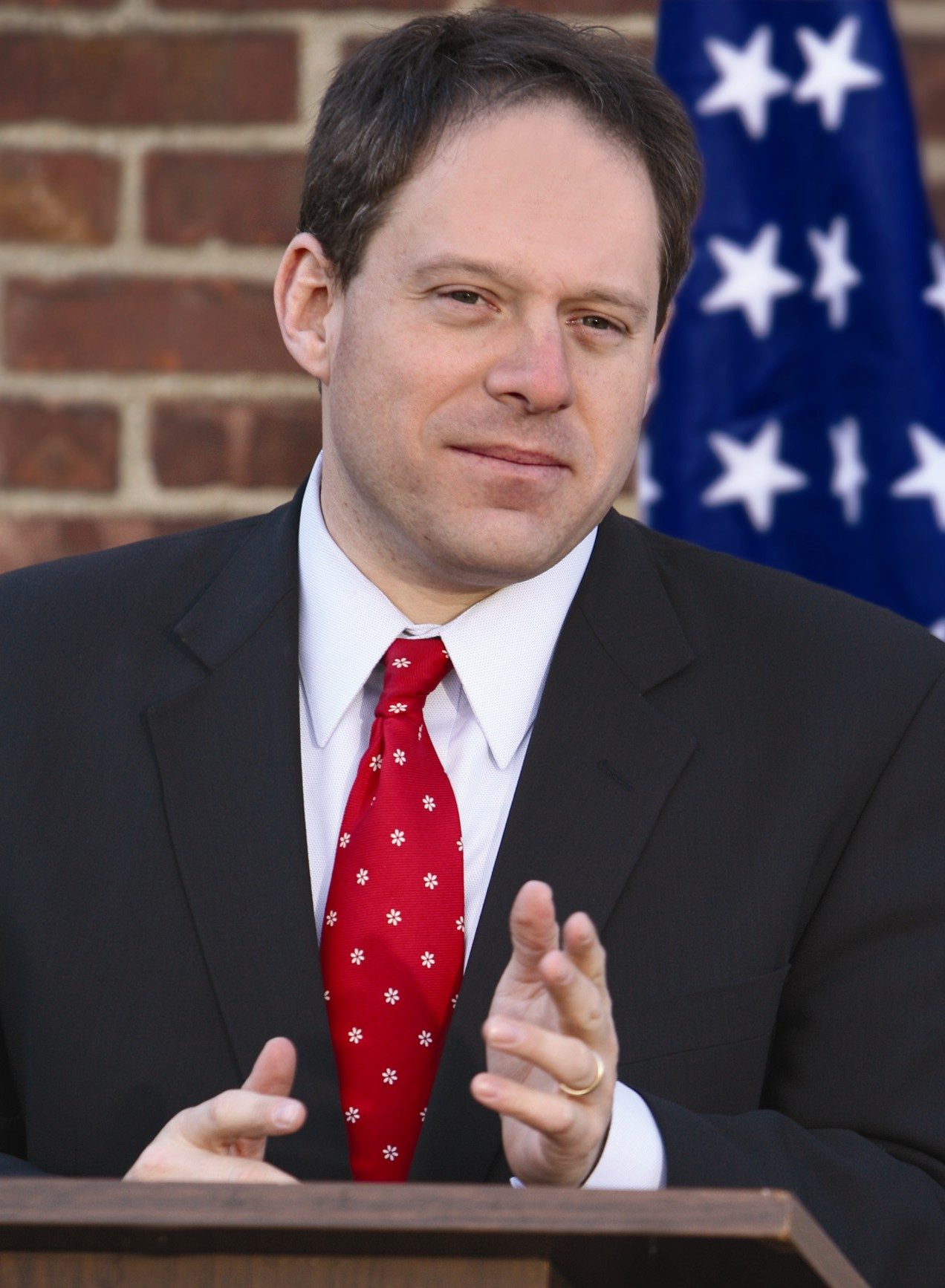
Nominee	Jake Blumencranz	Rory Lancman
Party	Republican	Democratic
Alliance	Conservative
Incumbent Senator
Jack Martins
Republican

The 7th district covers northwestern Nassau County in Long Island, including portions of North Hempstead and small areas of Hempstead and Oyster Bay. The incumbent is Republican Jack Martins, who was re-elected to a second consecutive and fifth overall term with 55.09% of the vote in 2024.

=== Republican primary ===
==== Nominee ====
- Jake Blumencranz, assemblymember

==== Withdrawn ====
- Jack Martins, incumbent senator

=== Democratic primary ===
==== Nominee ====
- Rory Lancman, former New York City councilmember from the 24th district (2014–2020)

== District 8 ==
2026 New York's 8th State Senate district election
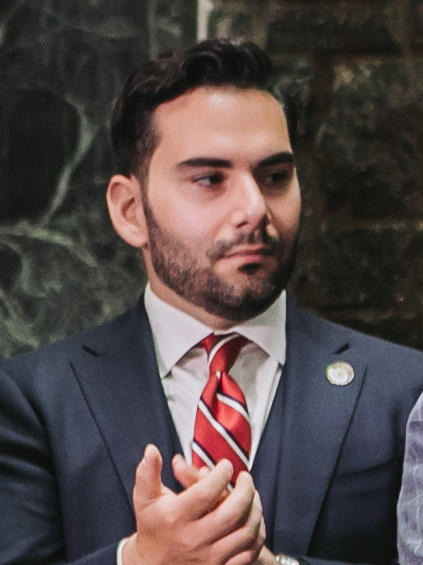

Nominee	Jarett Gandolfo	Josh Taveras
Party	Republican	Democratic
Alliance	Conservative
Incumbent Senator
Alexis Weik
Republican

The 8th district covers parts of the South Shore in Long Island, including Nassau and Suffolk counties. The incumbent is Republican Alexis Weik, who was re-elected to a third term with 67.2% of the vote in 2024.

=== Republican primary ===
==== Nominee ====
- Jarett Gandolfo, New York state assemblyman from the 7th district (2021-present)

==== Declined ====
- Alexis Weik, incumbent senator

=== Democratic primary ===
==== Nominee ====
- Josh Taveras

==== Endorsements ====
Josh Taveras

Political parties

- New York Working Families Party

== District 9 ==
2026 New York's 9th State Senate district election
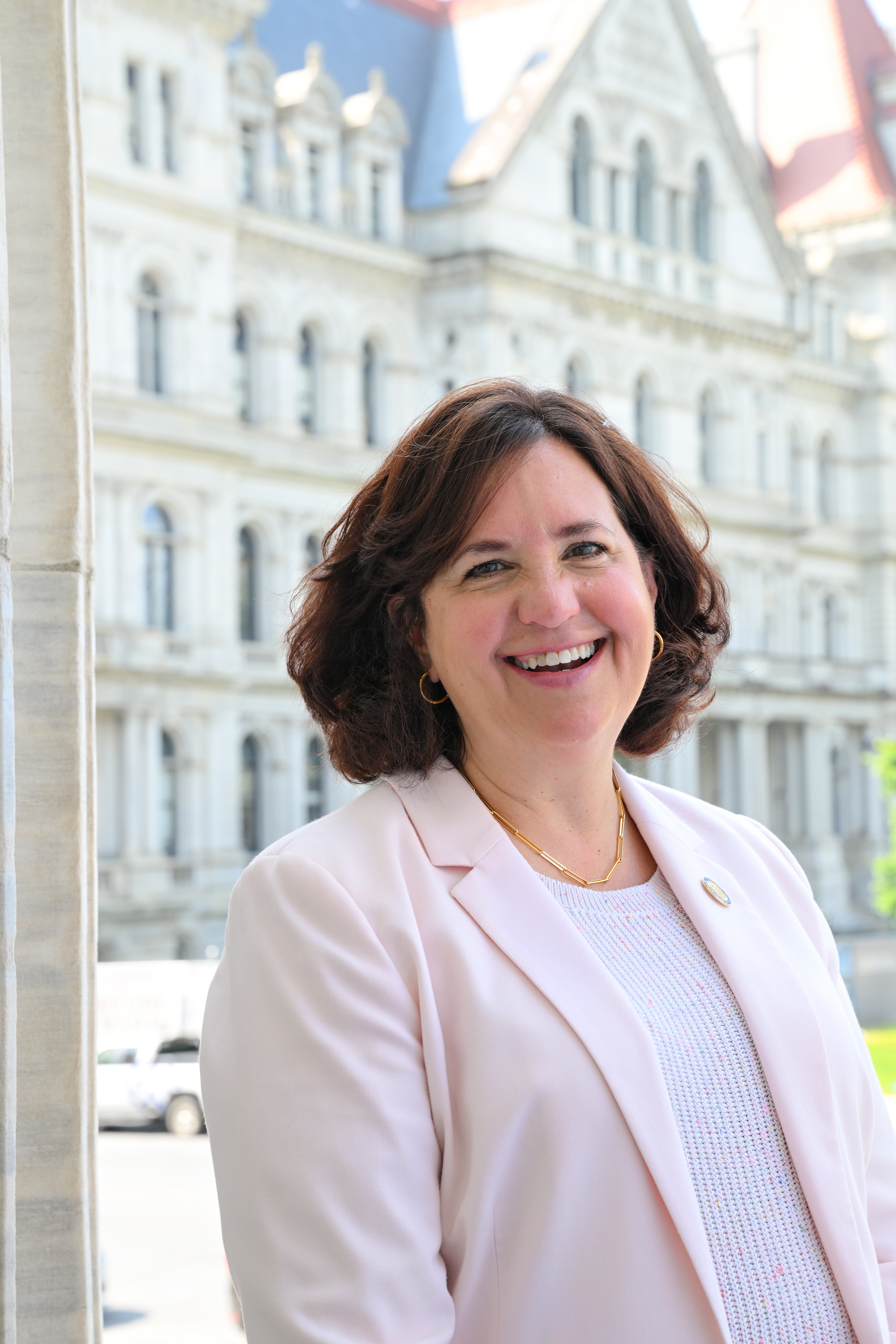

Nominee	Patricia Canzoneri-Fitzpatrick	Lisa Vider
Party	Republican	Democratic
Alliance	Conservative
Incumbent Senator
Patricia Canzoneri-Fitzpatrick
Republican

The 9th district covers almost the entire town of Hempstead and the small city of Long Beach in the South Shore in Long Island, entirely within Nassau County. The incumbent is Republican Patricia Canzoneri-Fitzpatrick, who was re-elected to a second term with 67.31% of the vote in 2024.

=== Republican primary ===
==== Nominee ====
- Patricia Canzoneri-Fitzpatrick, incumbent senator

=== Democratic primary ===
==== Nominee ====
- Lisa Vider, healthcare administrator

== District 10 ==
2026 New York's 10th State Senate district election
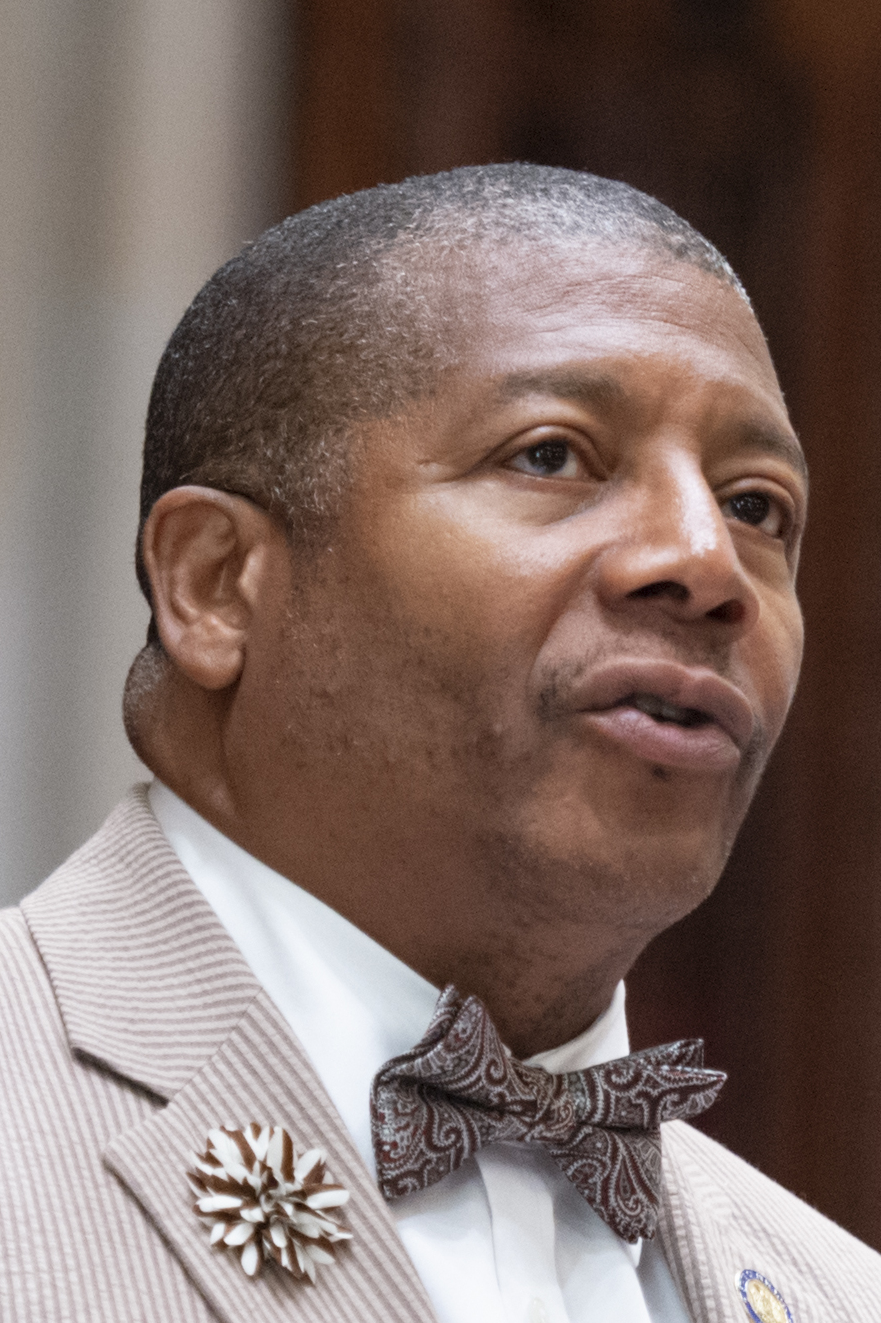
Nominee	James Sanders Jr.
Party	Democratic
Alliance	Working Families
Incumbent Senator
James Sanders Jr.
Democratic

The 10th district is located in southeast Queens, centered around JFK International Airport, including most of Springfield Gardens, The Rockaways, and portions of Rosedale, South Ozone Park, Howard Beach, Baisley Park, and Jamaica. The incumbent is Democrat James Sanders Jr., who was re-elected to a seventh term with 70.99% of the vote in 2024.

=== Democratic primary ===
==== Nominee ====
- James Sanders Jr., incumbent senator

==== Endorsements ====
James Sanders Jr.

Political parties

- New York Working Families Party

== District 11 ==
2026 New York's 11th State Senate district election
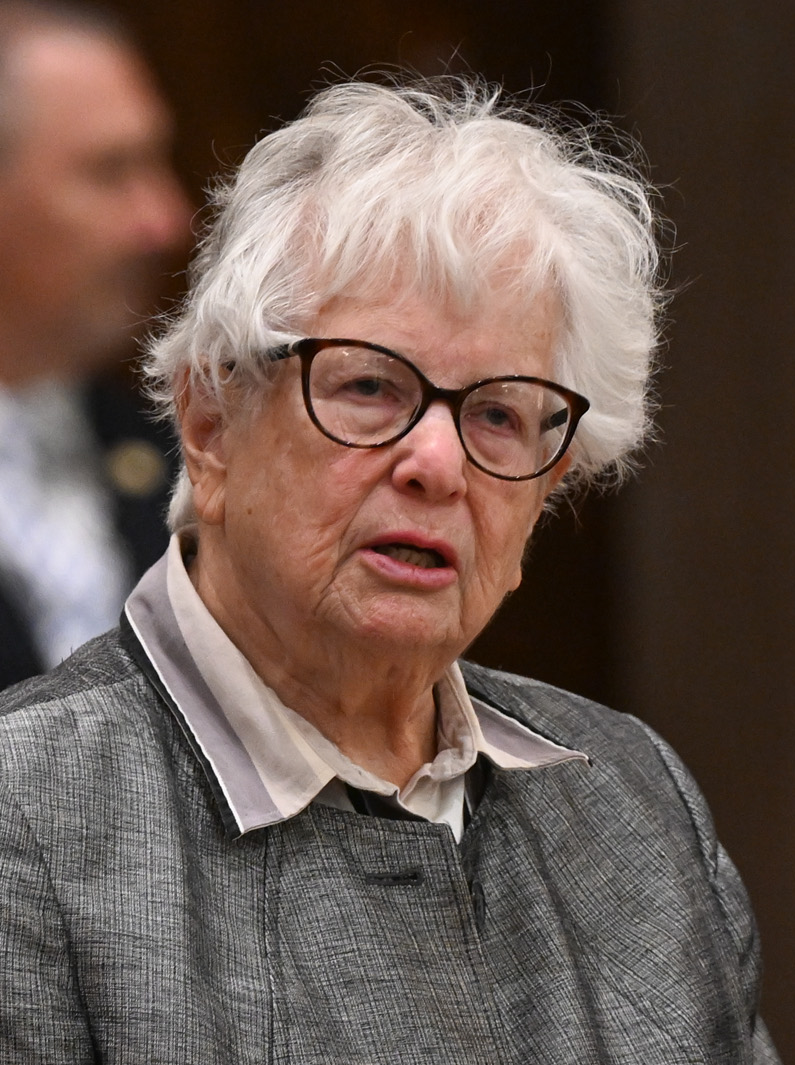

Nominee	Toby Ann Stavisky	Pamela H. Michos
Party	Democratic	Republican
Alliance		Conservative
Incumbent Senator
Toby Ann Stavisky
Democratic

The 11th district is located in northeast Queens, including most of Flushing, as well as College Point, Whitestone, Bayside, Douglaston–Little Neck, and parts of Hollis and Bellerose. The incumbent is Democrat Toby Ann Stavisky, who was re-elected to a thirteenth full term with 54.15% of the vote in 2024.

=== Democratic primary ===
==== Nominee ====
- Toby Ann Stavisky, incumbent senator

==== Withdrawn or disqualified ====
- Adam Azam, community leader
- Andrew R.Engel, attorney

=== Republican primary ===
==== Nominee ====
- Pamela H. Michos

== District 12 ==
2026 New York's 12th State Senate district election
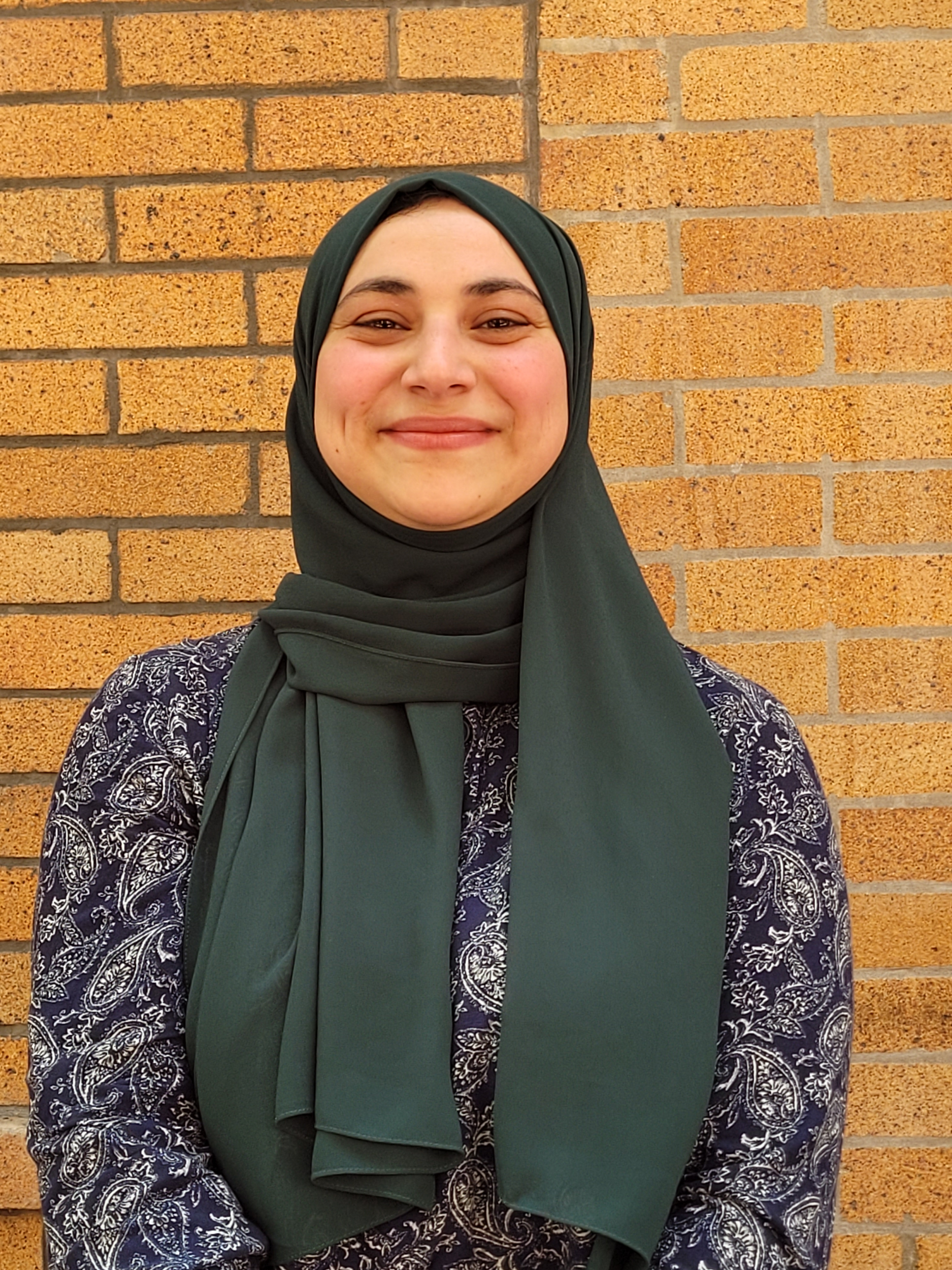

Nominee	Aber Kawas	Han-Khon To
Party	Democratic	Republican
Incumbent Senator
Vacant

The 12th district is located in northwest Queens, including covering the neighborhoods of Astoria, Long Island City, and Sunnyside, as well as parts of Woodside, Maspeth, Ridgewood and Woodhaven. Prior to his resignation on August 7, 2026, the incumbent was Democrat Michael Gianaris, who was re-elected to an eighth term with 67.39% of the vote in 2024.

=== Democratic primary ===
==== Nominee ====
- Aber Kawas, activist and organizer

==== Eliminated in primary ====
- Steven Raga, state assemblymember from the 30th district (2023–present)

==== Disqualified ====
- Sheryl Ann Fetik, Queens County Democratic Party committee member

==== Declined ====
- Amit Singh Bagga, consultant and former aide to Gov. Kathy Hochul
- Michael Gianaris, incumbent senator
- Brian Romero, chief of staff to state Senator Kristen Gonzalez and candidate for AD-34 in 2026
- Jimmy Van Bramer, former majority leader of the New York City Council (2014–2017) from the 26th District (2010–2021)

==== Endorsements ====
Aber Kawas

U.S. senators

- Bernie Sanders, Vermont (2007–present) (Independent)

Local officials

- Zohran Mamdani, mayor of New York City (2026–present)

Labor unions

- United Auto Workers Region 9A

Organizations

- Make the Road Action New York (2019–present)
- New York City Democratic Socialists of America
- Our Revolution
Steven Raga

State legislators

- Catalina Cruz, state assemblymember from the 39th district (2019–present)

Local officials

- Donovan Richards, borough president of Queens (2020–present)
- Jimmy Van Bramer, former majority leader of the New York City Council (2014–2017) from the 26th district (2010–2021)

Organizations

- Stonewall Democrats

==== Results ====
2026 New York State Senate Democratic primary, District 12
Party	Candidate	Votes	%
Democratic	Aber Kawas	13,023	60.3
Democratic	Steven Raga	8,486	39.3
Write-in		82	0.4
Total votes		21,591	100.0

=== Republican primary ===
==== Nominee ====
- Han Khon To, nominee for this district in 2024

== District 13 ==
2026 New York's 13th State Senate district election
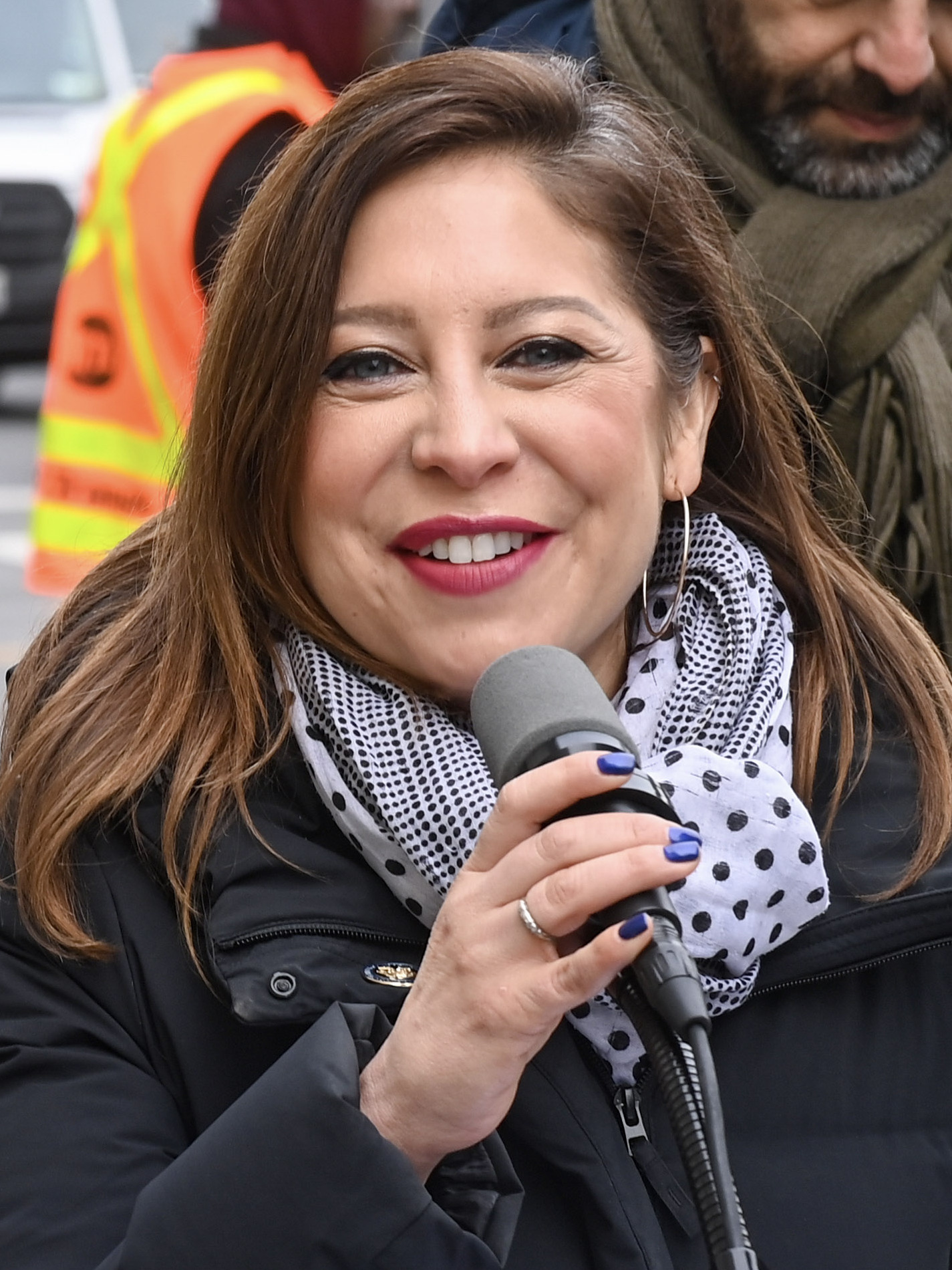

Nominee	Jessica González-Rojas	John Healy
Party	Democratic	Republican
Alliance	Working Families
Incumbent Senator
Jessica Ramos
Democratic

The 13th district is centered around the Queens neighborhood of Jackson Heights, and includes Corona, Elmhurst, East Elmhurst, and parts of Astoria and Woodside. The incumbent is Democrat Jessica Ramos, who was re-elected to a fourth term with 98.35% of the vote in 2024.

Ramos's 2026 challengers criticize her 2025 endorsement of New York City mayoral candidate Andrew Cuomo and the quality of life in the district. Ramos criticizes challenger Jessica González-Rojas for her support of a local casino project and criticizes challenger Hiram Monserrate for his past corruption and assault convictions.

=== Democratic primary ===
==== Nominee ====
- Jessica González-Rojas, state assemblymember from the 34th district

==== Eliminated in primary ====
- Hiram Monserrate, former member of the New York City Council and New York State Senate
- Jessica Ramos, incumbent senator

===== Endorsements =====
Jessica González-Rojas

U.S. senators

- Bernie Sanders, Vermont (2007–present) (Independent)

U.S. representatives

- Alexandria Ocasio-Cortez, NY-14 (2019–present)
- Nydia Velázquez, NY-07 (1993–present)

Statewide officials

- Letitia James, attorney general of New York (2019–present)

State legislators

- Catalina Cruz, state assemblymember from the 39th district (2019–present)
- Larinda Hooks, state assemblymember from the 35th district (2025–present)
- Steven Raga, state assemblymember from the 30th district (2025–present)
- Claire Valdez, state assemblymember from the 37th district (2025–present)

Local officials

- Alexa Avilés, New York City Council member from the 38th district (2022–present)
- Tiffany Cabán, New York City Council member from the 22nd district (2022–present)
- Shahana Hanif, New York City Council member from the 39th district (2022–present)
- Shekar Krishnan, New York City Council member from the 23rd district (2022–present)
- Brad Lander, New York City Comptroller (2022–2025)
- Linda Lee, New York City Council member from the 25th district (2022–present)
- Donovan Richards, Queens borough president (2020–present)
- Jumaane Williams, New York City public advocate (2019–present)

Organizations

- Latino Victory Fund
- Make the Road New York Action
- NARAL Pro-Choice America
- Stonewall Democrats
- Sunrise NYC

Labor unions

- 1199SEIU United Healthcare Workers East

Political parties

- New York Working Families Party
Jessica Ramos

State legislators

- Andrea Stewart-Cousins, state senate majority leader (2019–present) from the 35th district (2007-present)

Labor unions

- Transport Workers Union of America Local 100

==== Results ====
2026 New York State Senate Democratic primary, District 13
Party	Candidate	Votes	%
Democratic	Jessica González-Rojas	6,636	48.0
Democratic	Jessica Ramos (incumbent)	5,133	37.1
Democratic	Hiram Monserrate	2,000	14.5
Write-in		60	0.4
Total votes		13,829	100.0

=== Republican primary ===
==== Nominee ====
- John Healy, budget analyst

== District 14 ==
2026 New York's 14th State Senate district election
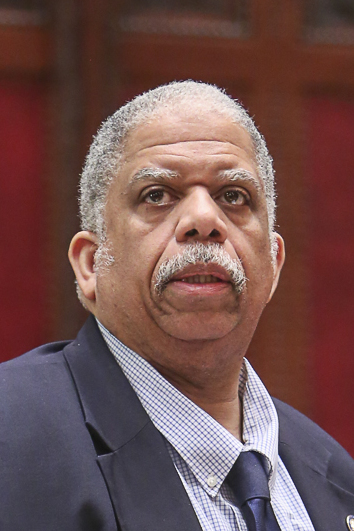
Nominee	Leroy Comrie
Party	Democratic
Incumbent Senator
Leroy Comrie
Democratic

The 14th district is located in eastern Queens, containing portions of St. Albans, Cambria Heights, Jamaica, Hollis, Rosedale, Laurelton, Kew Gardens, and Queens Village. The incumbent is Democrat Leroy Comrie, who was re-elected to a sixth term with 98.99% of the vote in 2024.

=== Democratic primary ===
==== Nominee ====
- Leroy Comrie, incumbent senator

== District 15 ==
2026 New York's 15th State Senate district election
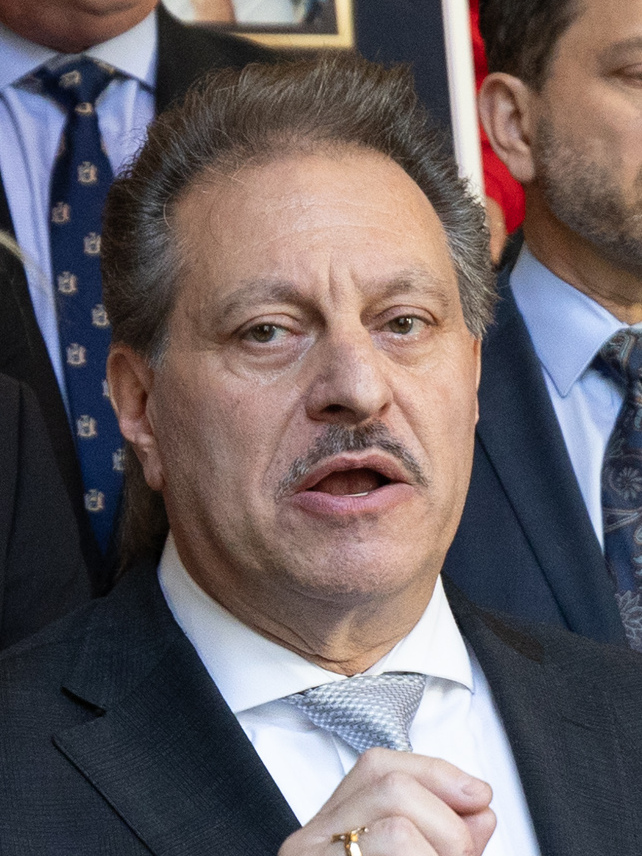
Nominee	Joseph Addabbo Jr.
Party	Democratic
Incumbent Senator
Joseph Addabbo Jr.
Democratic

The 15th district is located in central and southern Queens, covering most of the neighborhoods of Glendale, Middle Village, Richmond Hill and Woodhaven, as well as portions of Ozone Park, South Ozone Park, Ridgewood, Lindenwood, and Rego Park. The incumbent is Democrat Joseph Addabbo Jr., who was re-elected to a ninth term with 76.5% of the vote in 2024.

=== Democratic primary ===
==== Nominee ====
- Joseph Addabbo Jr., incumbent senator

==== Eliminated in primary ====
- Albert Baldeo, community advocate

==== Results ====
2026 New York State Senate Democratic primary, District 15
Party	Candidate	Votes	%
Democratic	Joseph Addabbo Jr. (incumbent)	7,822	73.6
Democratic	Albert Baldeo	2,752	25.9
Write-in		60	0.6
Total votes		10,634	100.0

=== Republican primary ===
==== Disqualified ====
- Danniel Maio

== District 16 ==
2026 New York's 16th State Senate district election
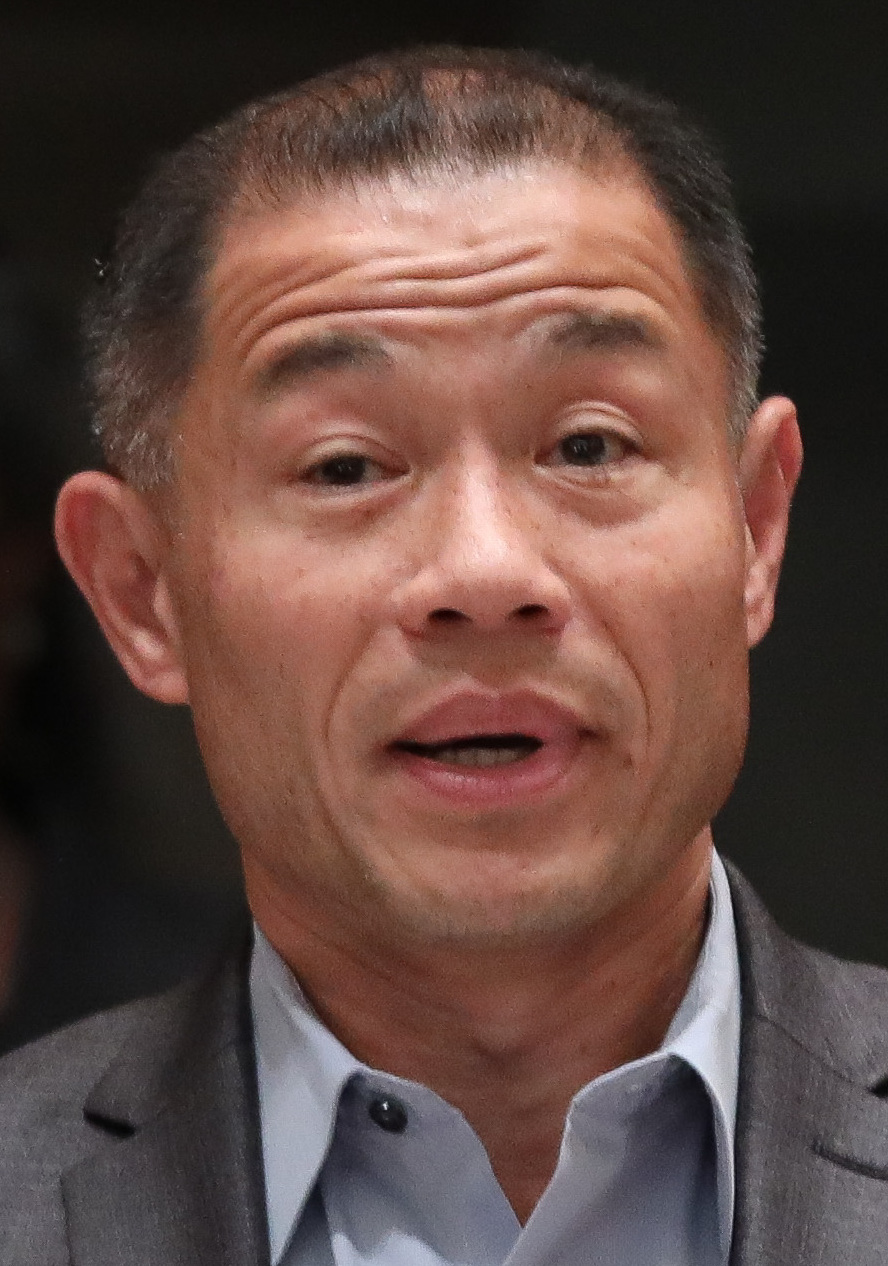
Nominee	John Liu
Party	Democratic
Alliance	Working Families
Incumbent Senator
John Liu
Democratic

The 16th district is located in central Queens, covering parts of the neighborhoods of Flushing, Fresh Meadows, and Bayside. The incumbent is Democrat John Liu, who was re-elected to a fourth term with 79.39% of the vote in 2024.

=== Democratic primary ===
==== Nominee ====
- John Liu, incumbent senator

==== Endorsements ====
John Liu

Political parties

- New York Working Families Party

=== Republican primary ===
==== Disqualified ====
- Philip Wang, chiropractor

== District 17 ==
2026 New York's 17th State Senate district election
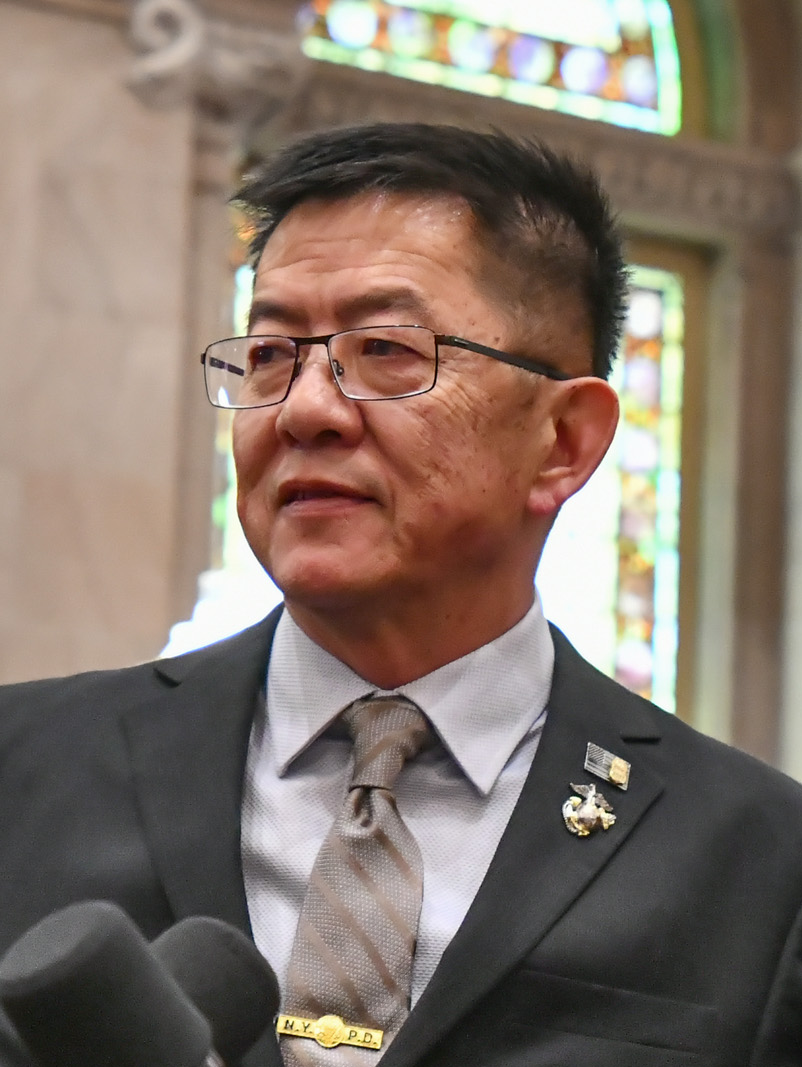
Nominee	Steve Chan	Larry He
Party	Republican	Democratic
Alliance	Conservative
Incumbent Senator
Steve Chan
Republican

The 17th district is located in southwestern Brooklyn, covering portions of the neighborhoods of Bath Beach, Bay Ridge, Sunset Park, Kensington, Dyker Heights, Bensonhurst, and Gravesend. The incumbent is Republican Steve Chan, who defeated Democratic one-term incumbent Iwen Chu with 54.66% of the vote in 2024.

=== Republican primary ===
==== Nominee ====
- Steve Chan, incumbent senator

=== Democratic primary ===
==== Nominee ====
- Larry He, chief of staff to William Colton

==== Withdrawn ====
- Iwen Chu, former senator (2023–2025)

== District 18 ==
2026 New York's 18th State Senate district election
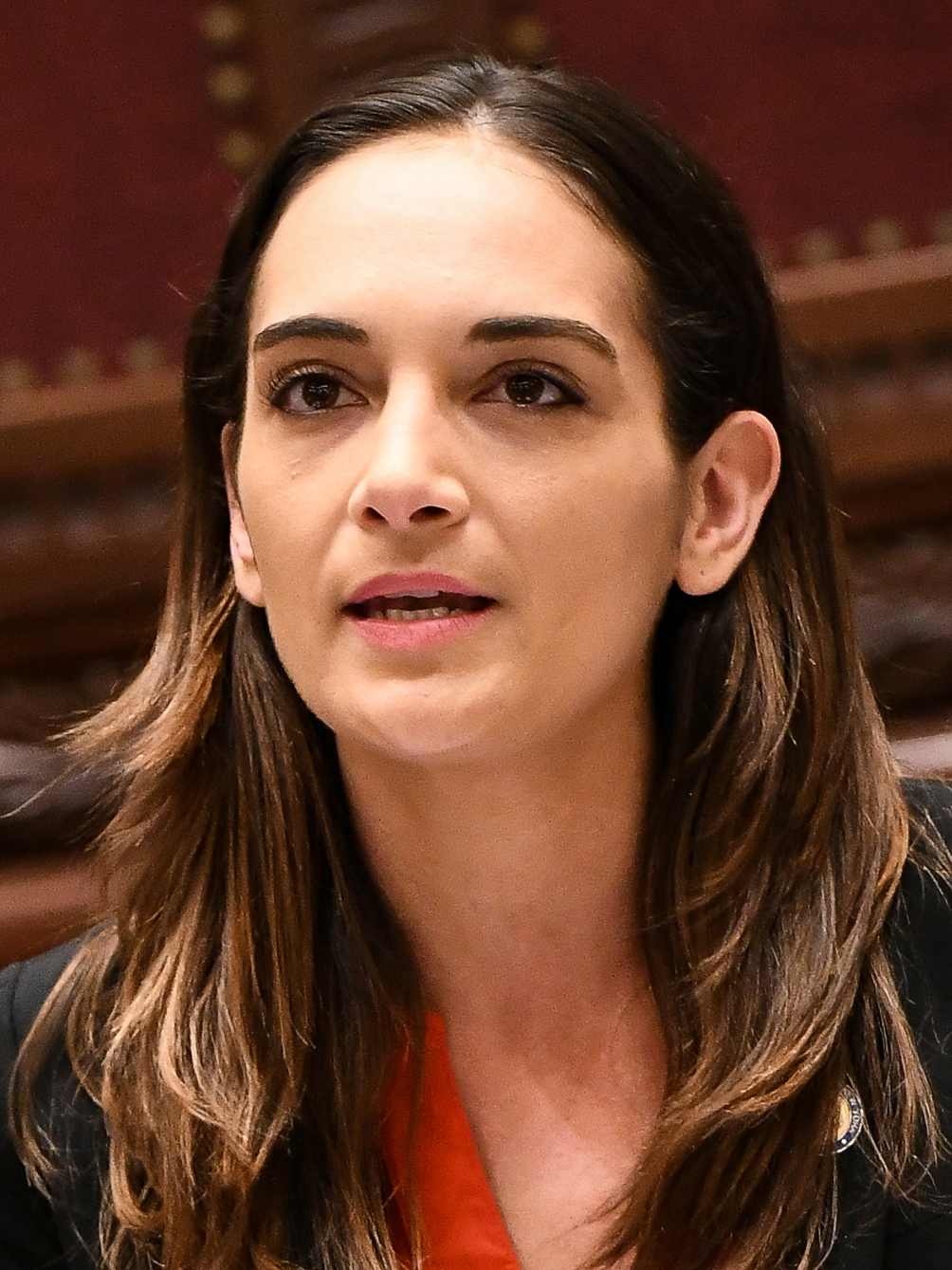
Nominee	Julia Salazar
Party	Democratic
Alliance	Working Families
Incumbent Senator
Julia Salazar
Democratic

The 18th district is located in northern Brooklyn, which includes the neighborhoods of Bushwick, Cypress Hills, Greenpoint, Williamsburg, and parts of Bedford–Stuyvesant, Brownsville, and East New York. The incumbent is Democrat Julia Salazar, who was re-elected to a fourth term with 99.15% of the vote in 2024.

=== Democratic primary ===
==== Nominee ====
- Julia Salazar, incumbent senator

==== Endorsements ====
Julia Salazar

Political parties

- New York Working Families Party

== District 19 ==
2026 New York's 19th State Senate district election
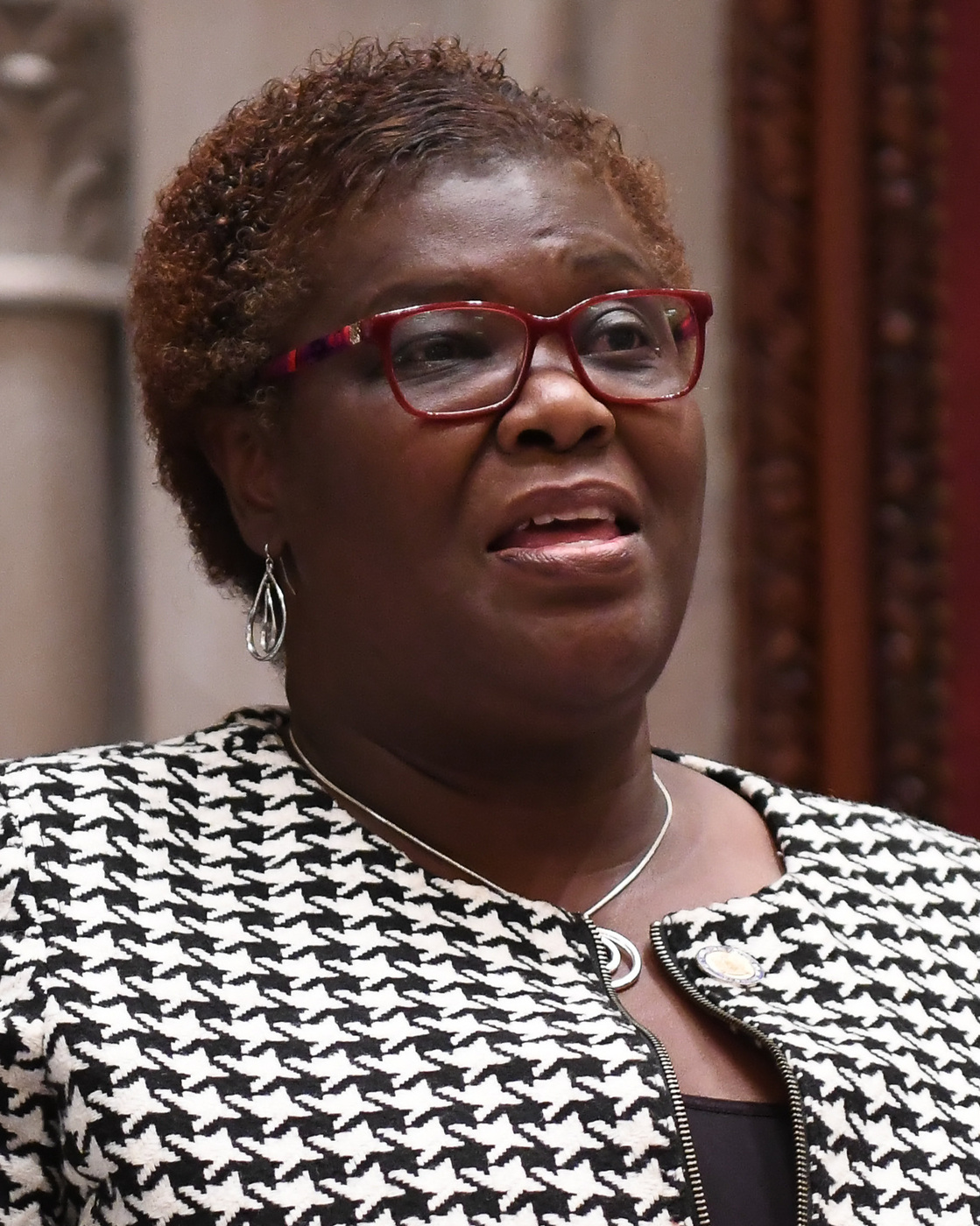
Nominee	Roxanne Persaud
Party	Democratic
Incumbent Senator
Roxanne Persaud
Democratic

The 19th district is located in southeastern Brooklyn and a portion of southwestern Queens, which includes most of the Brooklyn neighborhoods of Canarsie, East New York and Starrett City, portions of Bergen Beach, Brownsville, Remsen Village, and Cypress Hills, and the Queens neighborhood of Lindenwood. The incumbent is Democrat Roxanne Persaud, who was re-elected to a fifth full term with 99.58% of the vote in 2024.

=== Democratic primary ===
==== Nominee ====
- Roxanne Persaud, incumbent senator

== District 20 ==
2026 New York's 20th State Senate district election
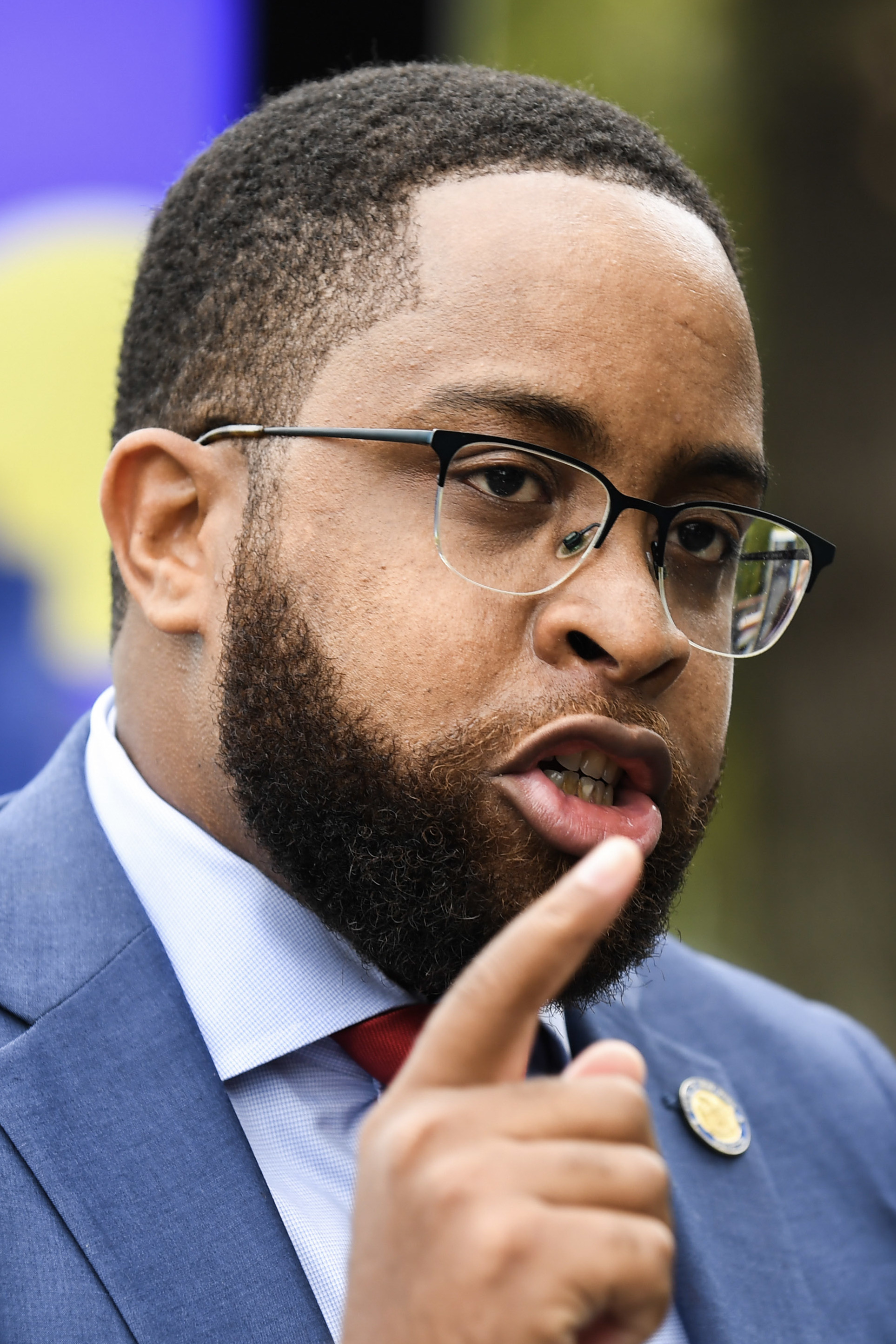
Nominee	Zellnor Myrie
Party	Democratic
Alliance	Working Families
Incumbent Senator
Zellnor Myrie
Democratic

The 20th district is located in central and western Brooklyn, which includes most of the neighborhoods of Crown Heights, Prospect Lefferts Gardens and Windsor Terrace, as well as portions of East Flatbush, Kensington, Park Slope, Remsen Village, Prospect Heights, South Slope and Sunset Park. The incumbent is Democrat Zellnor Myrie, who was re-elected to a fourth term with 99.34% of the vote in 2024.

=== Democratic primary ===
==== Nominee ====
- Zellnor Myrie, incumbent senator

==== Declined ====
- Brian Cunningham, New York state assembly member for the 43rd district

==== Endorsements ====
Zellnor Myrie

Political parties

- New York Working Families Party

== District 21 ==
2026 New York's 21st State Senate district election
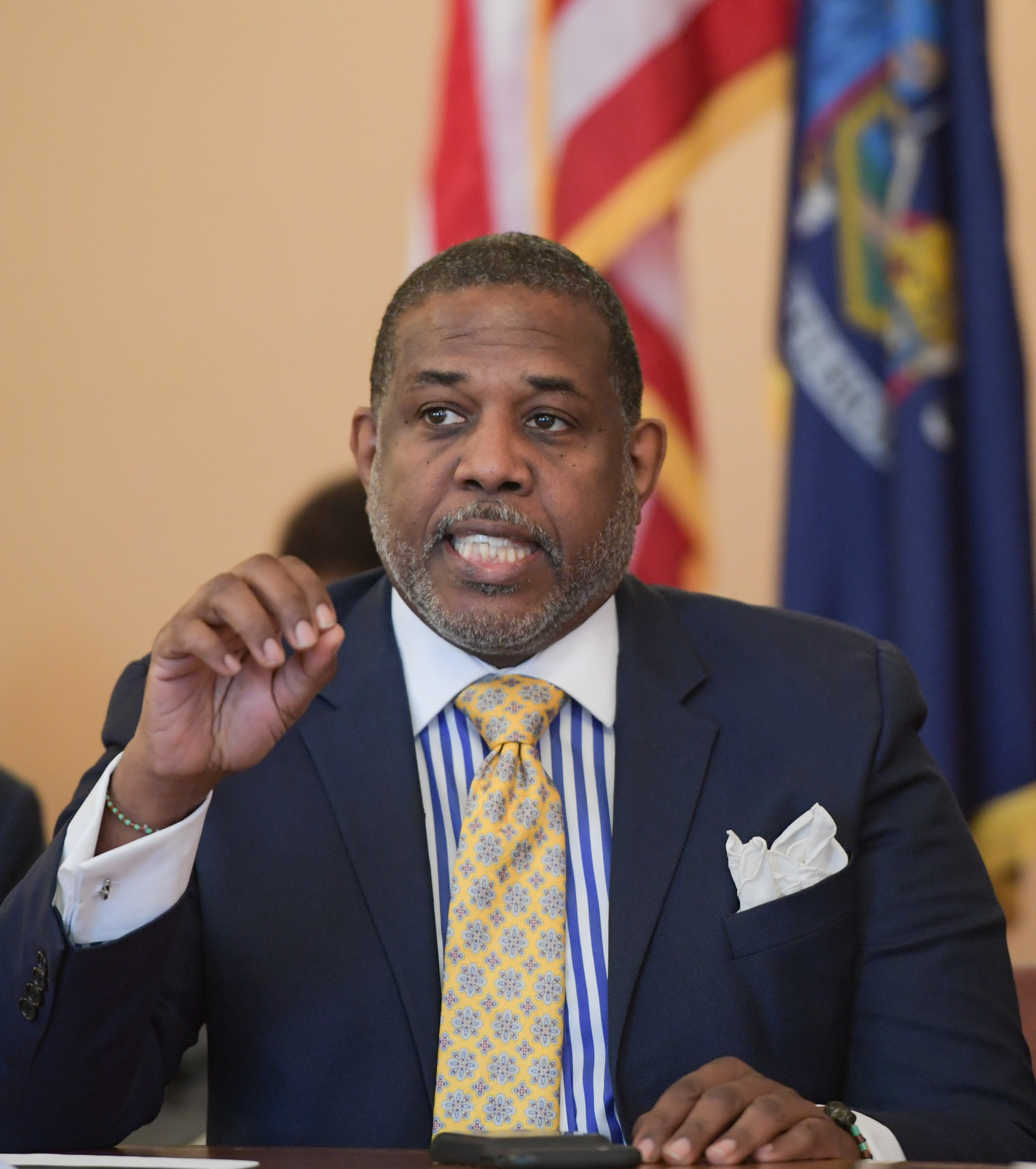

Nominee	Kevin Parker	Ronald Seifert
Party	Democratic	Republican
Alliance		Conservative
Incumbent Senator
Kevin Parker
Democratic

The 21st district is located in central and southern Brooklyn, covering portions of Bergen Beach, Flatbush, East Flatbush, Flatlands, Georgetown and Mill Basin, as well as portions of Marine Park, Midwood and Kensington. The incumbent is Democrat Kevin Parker, who was re-elected to a twelfth term with 99.09% of the vote in 2024.

=== Democratic primary ===
==== Nominee ====
- Kevin Parker, incumbent senator

=== Republican primary ===
==== Nominee ====
- Ronald Seifert

== District 22 ==
2026 New York's 22nd State Senate district election
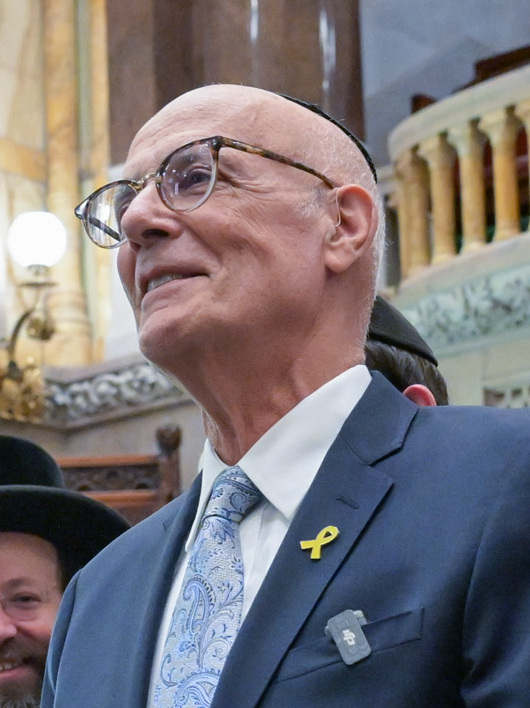

Nominee	Sam Sutton	Nachman Carl Caller
Party	Democratic	Republican
Alliance		Conservative
Incumbent Senator
Sam Sutton
Democratic

The 22nd district is located in southern Brooklyn, covering portions of Borough Park, Midwood, Madison, Homecrest, Gravesend, Gerritsen Beach, Sheepshead Bay, and Marine Park. The incumbent is Democrat Sam Sutton, who was elected in a special election with 57.03% of the vote in May 2025.

In 2024, incumbent Democratic senator Simcha Felder, who caucused with the Republican Party until 2019, won re-election to a seventh term with 99.09% of the vote. On April 9, 2025, he resigned from the state senate to become the New York City Council member for the 44th district after winning a special election on March 25. On May 20, Democrat Sam Sutton won the special election with 57.03% of the vote against Republican Nachman Carl Caller to succeed Felder. Sutton was sworn in on May 27.

=== Democratic primary ===
==== Nominee ====
- Sam Sutton, incumbent senator

=== Republican primary ===
==== Nominee ====
- Nachman "Carl" Caller, candidate for this district in the 2025 special election and for New York State Assembly in 2014 New York State Assembly election

==== Eliminated in primary ====
- Bernard Vaiselberg, businessman and community activist

==== Results ====
2026 New York State Senate Republican primary, District 22
Party	Candidate	Votes	%
Republican	Nachman Carl Caller	535	44.5
Republican	Bernard Vaiselberg	517	43.0
Write-in		151	12.6
Total votes		1,203	100.0

== District 23 ==
2026 New York's 23rd State Senate district election
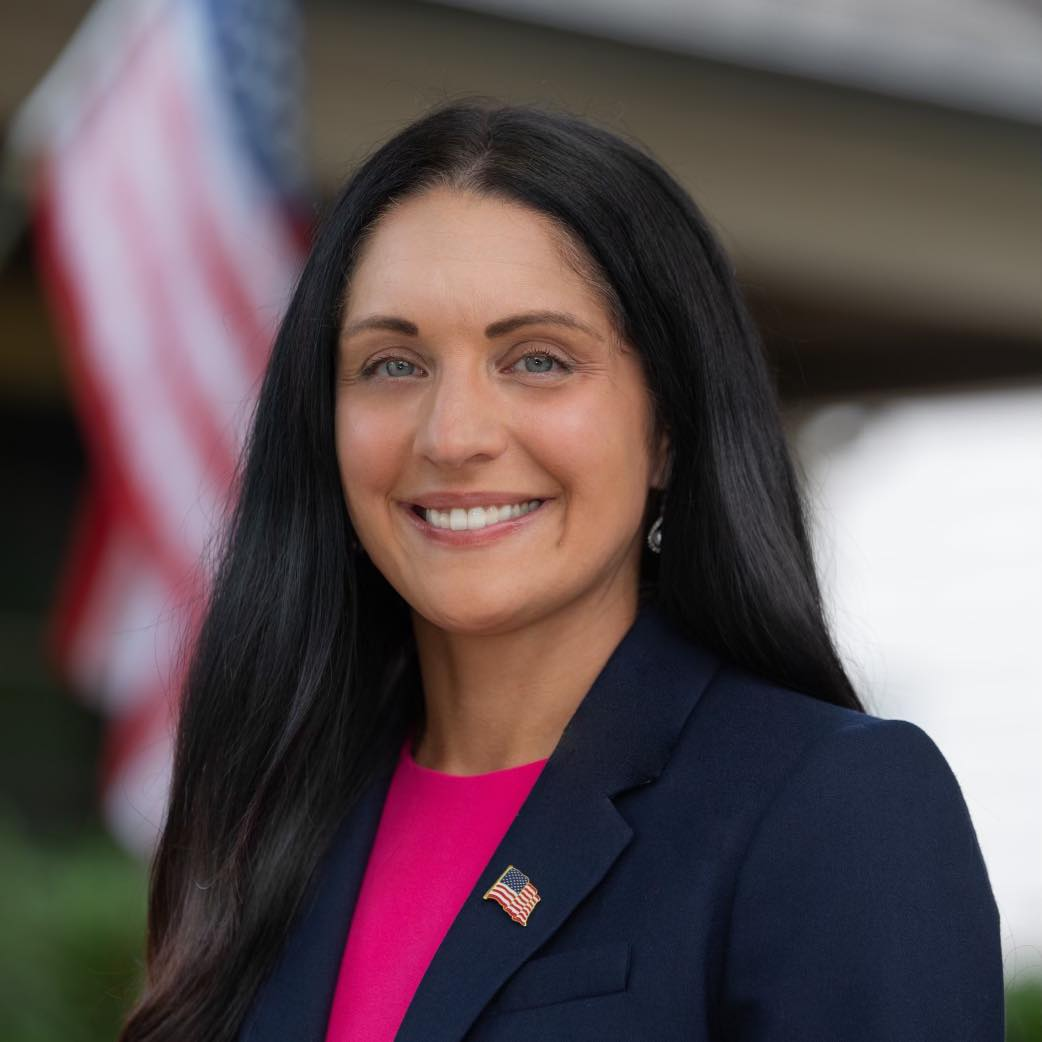

Nominee	Jessica Scarcella-Spanton	Ruslan Shamal
Party	Democratic	Republican
Alliance		Conservative
Incumbent Senator
Jessica Scarcella-Spanton
Democratic

The 23rd district covers much of the North Shore of Staten Island, including the neighborhoods of Mariners Harbor, Elm Park, West New Brighton, St. George, Stapleton Heights, Arrochar, and Dongan Hills. The district also covers parts of some southern Brooklyn neighborhoods, including Bensonhurst, Brighton Beach, Coney Island, Dyker Heights, Gravesend, Manhattan Beach, and Sheepshead Bay. The incumbent is Democrat Jessica Scarcella-Spanton, who was re-elected to a second term with 54.98% of the vote in 2024.

=== Democratic primary ===
==== Nominee ====
- Jessica Scarcella-Spanton, incumbent senator

==== Eliminated in primary ====
- Omar Mohamad, former EMS

==== Endorsements ====
Omar Mohamad (D)

U.S. representatives

- Jamaal Bowman, former NY-16 (2021–2025)

==== Results ====
2026 New York State Senate Democratic primary, District 23
Party	Candidate	Votes	%
Democratic	Jessica Scarcella-Spanton (incumbent)	6,793	72.6
Democratic	Omar Mohamad	2,524	27.0
Write-in		34	0.4
Total votes		9,351	100.0

=== Republican primary ===
==== Nominee ====
- Ruslan Shamal, radio presenter and candidate for New York City Council in 2023

==== Declined ====
- Steven Margolis, chairman of the New York Federation of College Republicans (explored run but withdrew)

== District 24 ==
2026 New York's 24th State Senate district election
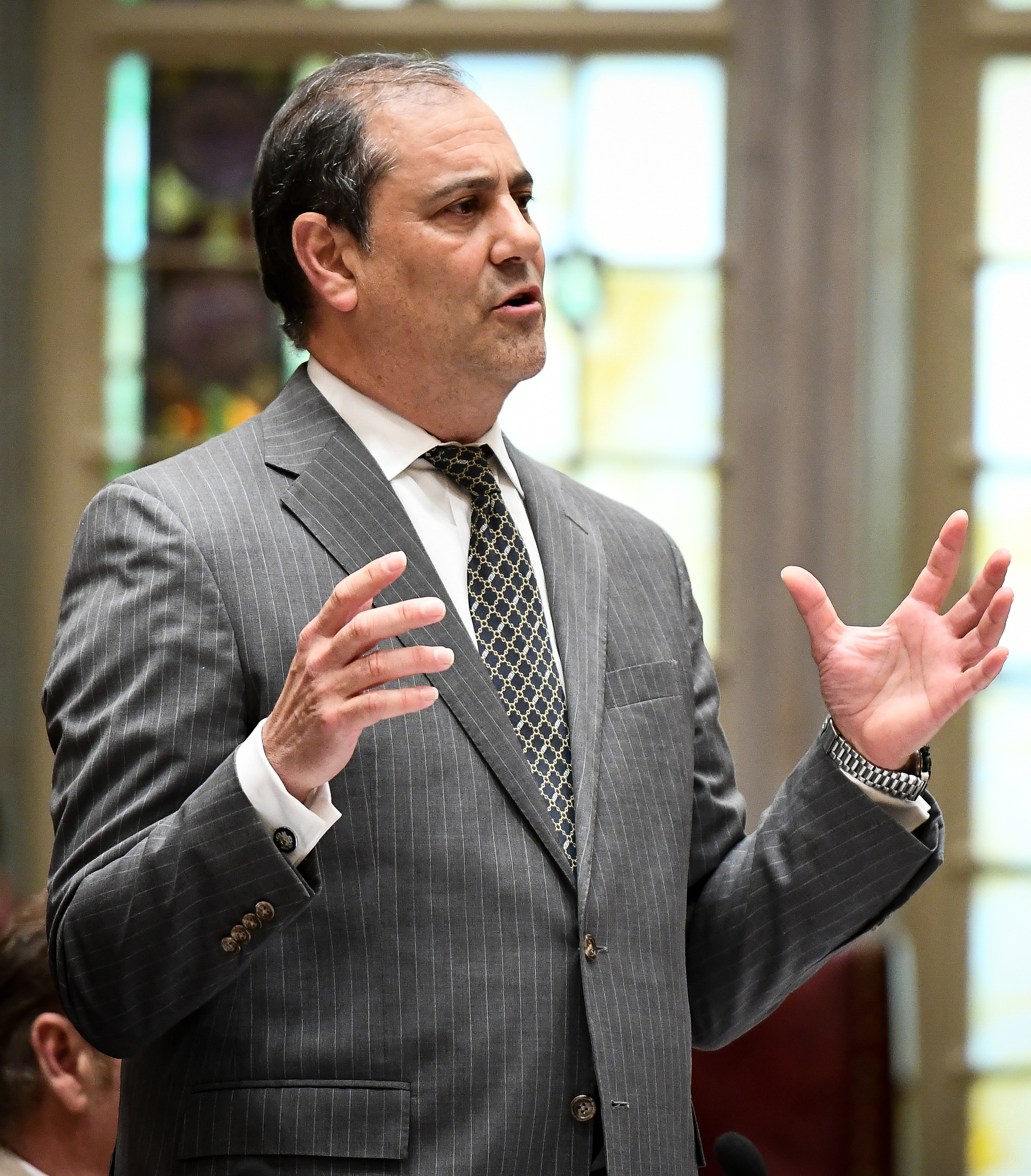

Nominee	Andrew Lanza	Alexis Rodriguez
Party	Republican	Democratic
Alliance	Conservative
Incumbent Senator
Andrew Lanza
Republican

The 24th district covers the southern two-thirds of Staten Island, including the southernmost point in the state of New York. The incumbent is Republican Andrew Lanza, who was re-elected to a tenth term with 98.24% of the vote in 2024.

=== Republican primary ===
==== Nominee ====
- Andrew Lanza, incumbent senator

=== Democratic primary ===
==== Nominee ====
- Alexis Rodriguez, teacher

== District 25 ==
2026 New York's 25th State Senate district election
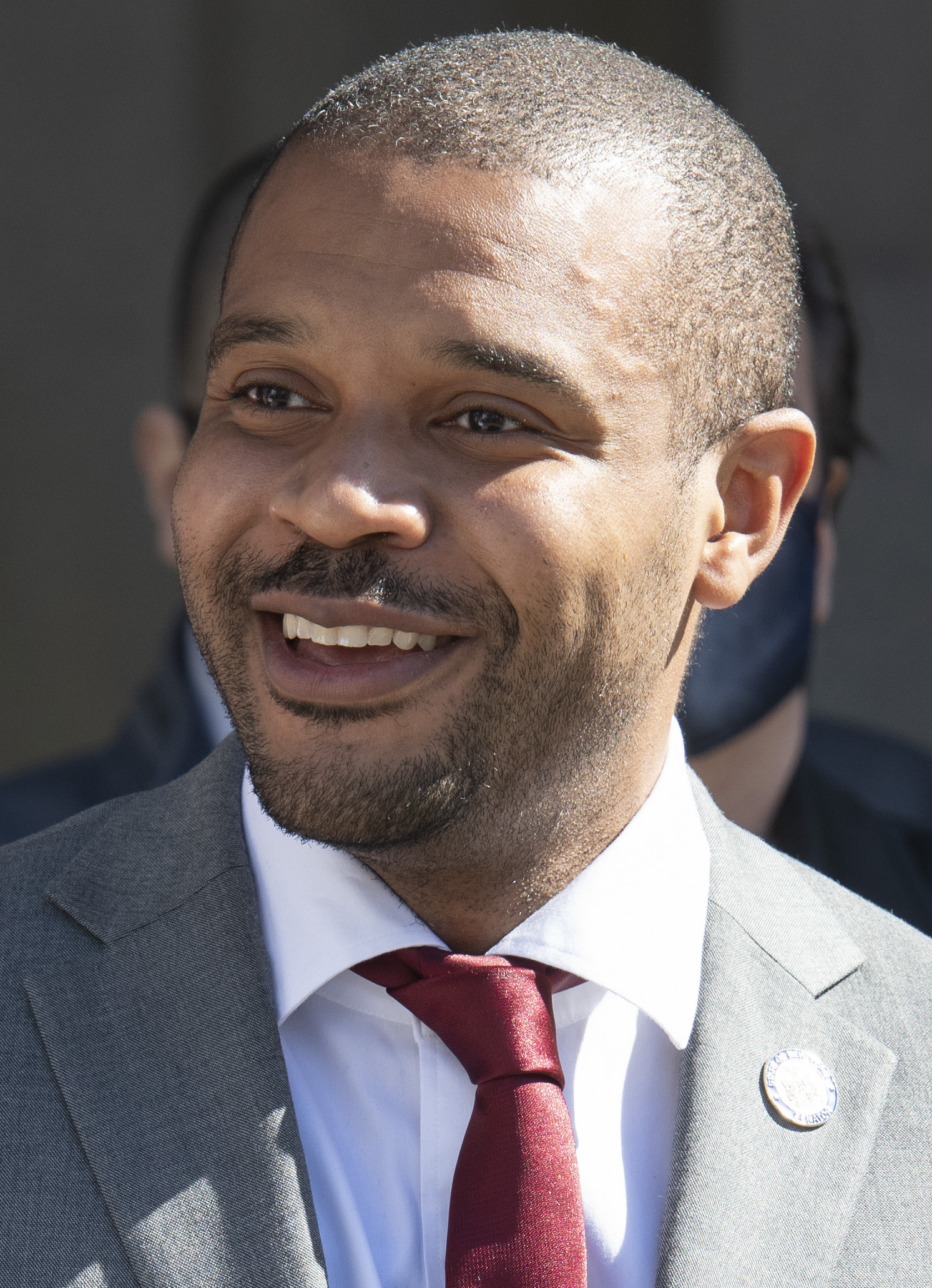
Nominee	Jabari Brisport
Party	Democratic
Alliance	Working Families
Incumbent Senator
Jabari Brisport
Democratic

The 25th district covers central and eastern Brooklyn, including most or all of Bedford–Stuyvesant, Clinton Hill, Fort Greene and Ocean Hill and portions of Crown Heights, Prospect Heights, Downtown Brooklyn, Bushwick and Brownsville. The incumbent is Democrat Jabari Brisport, who was re-elected to a third term with 99.42% of the vote in 2024.

=== Democratic primary ===
==== Nominee ====
- Jabari Brisport, incumbent senator

==== Eliminated in primary ====
- Marlon Rice, community activist

==== Endorsements ====
Jabari Brisport

Political parties

- New York Working Families Party

==== Results ====
2026 New York State Senate Democratic primary, District 25
Party	Candidate	Votes	%
Democratic	Jabari Brisport (incumbent)	8,921	79.9
Democratic	Marlon Rice	2,187	19.6
Write-in		55	0.5
Total votes		11,163	100.0

== District 26 ==
2026 New York's 26th State Senate district election
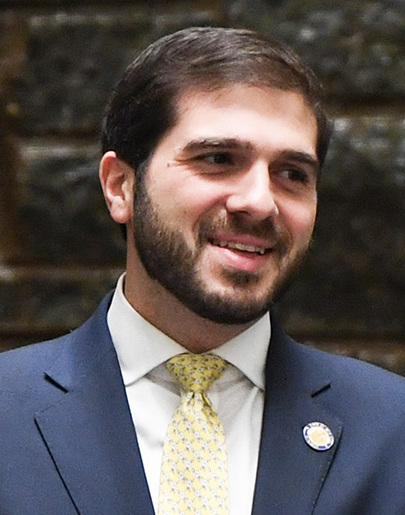

Nominee	Andrew Gounardes	Tom Stanten
Party	Democratic	Republican
Alliance	Working Families	Conservative
Incumbent Senator
Andrew Gounardes
Democratic

The 26th district covers western Brooklyn, including the neighborhoods of Carroll Gardens, Cobble Hill, the Columbia Street Waterfront District, Dumbo, Dyker Heights, Fort Hamilton, Gowanus, Park Slope, Red Hook, South Slope, and Sunset Park. Outside of Brooklyn but also within its boundaries are the Brooklyn Bridge, the Statue of Liberty, and Ellis Island. The incumbent is Democrat Andrew Gounardes, who was re-elected to a fourth term with 78.53% of the vote in 2024.

=== Democratic primary ===
==== Nominee ====
- Andrew Gounardes, incumbent senator

==== Endorsements ====
Andrew Gournardes

Political parties

- New York Working Families Party

=== Republican primary ===
==== Nominee ====
- Tom Stanten, veteran

== District 27 ==
2026 New York's 27th State Senate district election
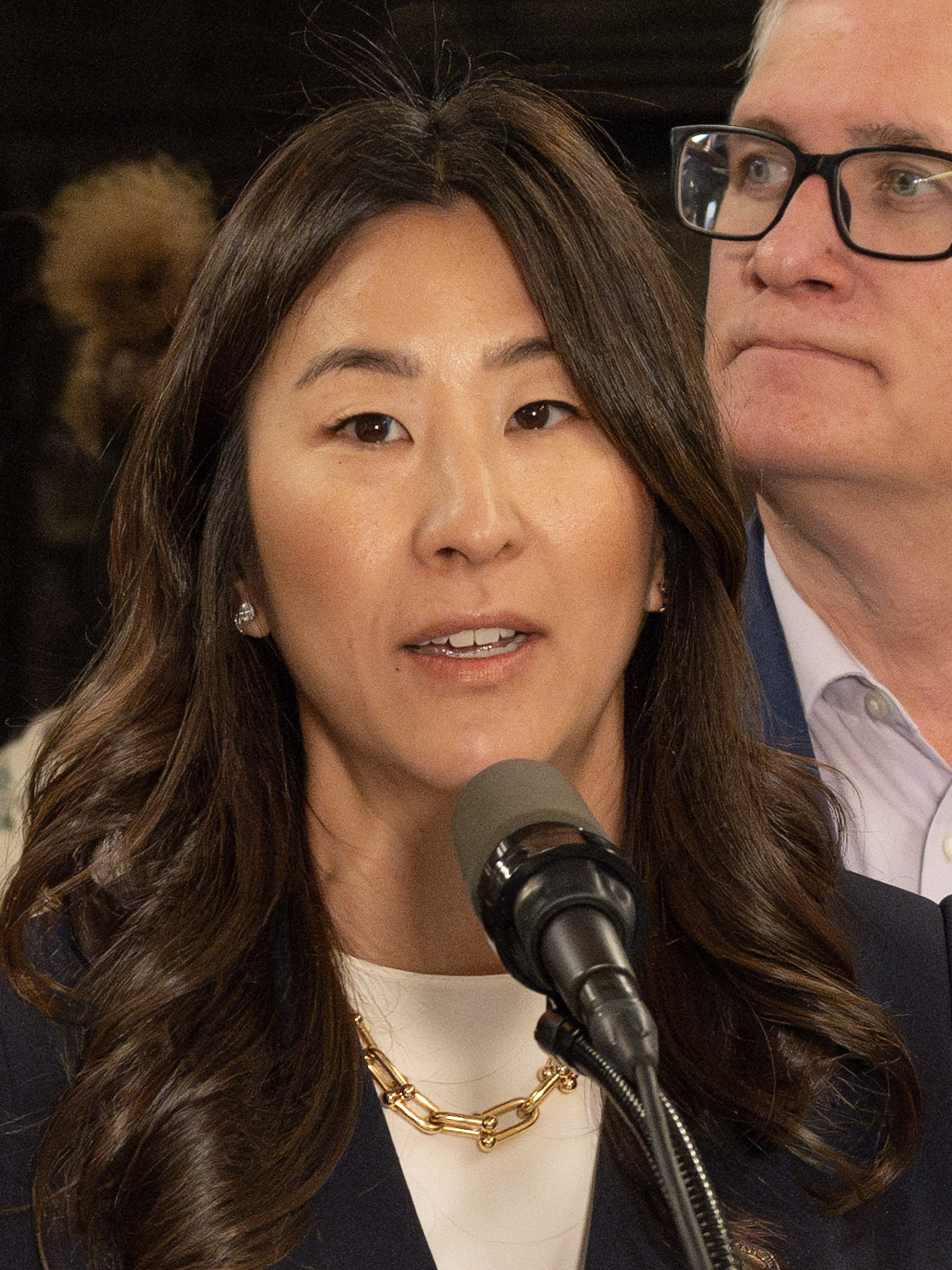

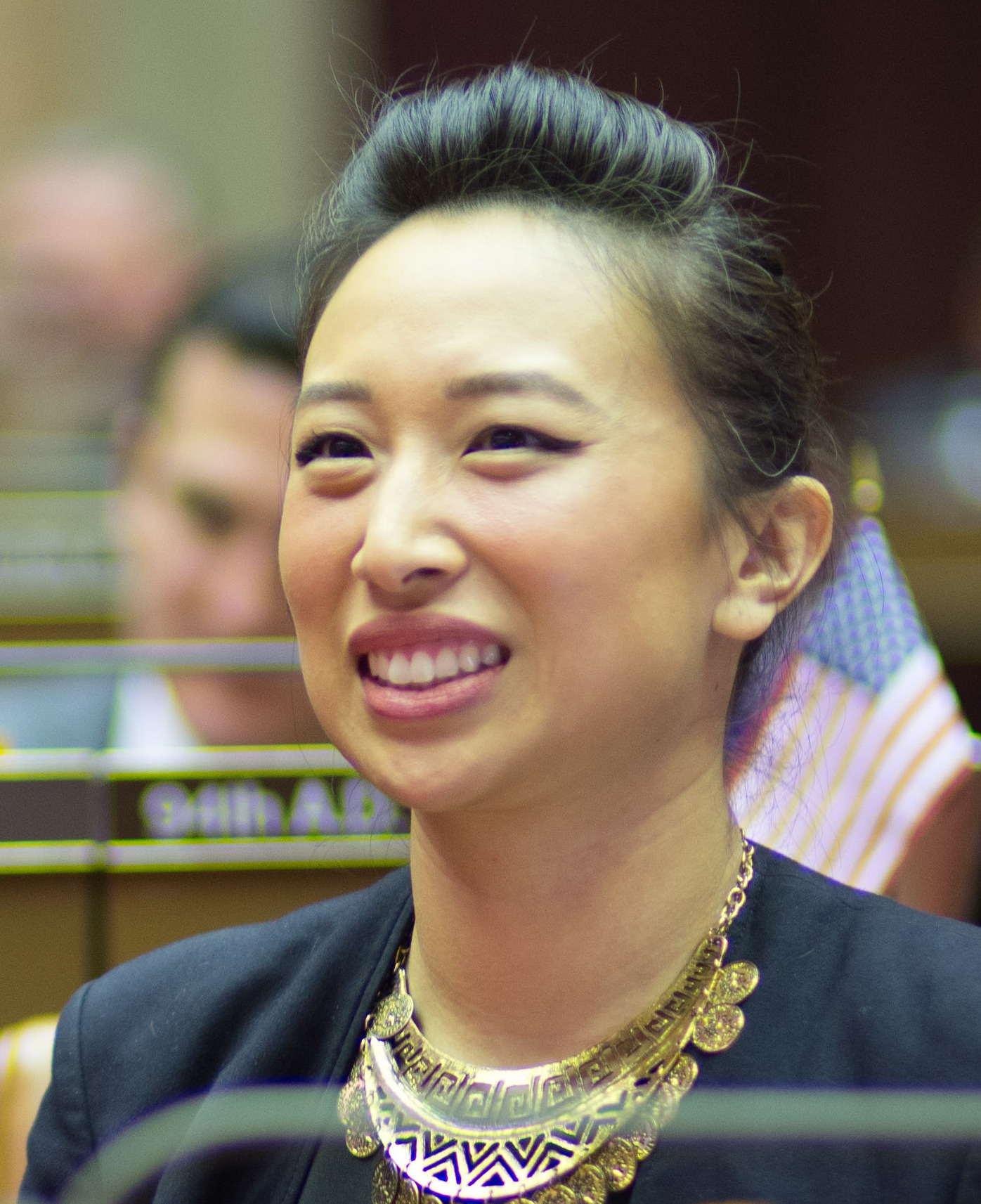
Nominee	Grace Lee	Jason Murillo	Yuh-Line Niou
Party	Democratic	Republican	Working Families
Alliance		Conservative
Incumbent Senator
Brian P. Kavanagh
Democratic

The 27th district covers much of Lower Manhattan, including portions of Greenwich Village, the East Village, Tribeca, Little Italy, Chinatown, Soho, and the Financial District. The incumbent is Democrat Brian P. Kavanagh, who was re-elected to a fourth full term with 99.09% of the vote in 2024.

=== Democratic primary ===
==== Nominee ====
- Grace Lee, state assemblymember from the 65th district (2022–present)

==== Eliminated in primary ====
- Yuh-Line Niou, former state assemblymember from the 65th district (2017–2022)

==== Declined ====
- Brian Kavanagh, incumbent senator (endorsed Lee)

==== Endorsements ====
Grace Lee

State legislators

- Brian Kavanagh, incumbent state senator

Labor unions

- District Council 37
- Hotel and Gaming Trades Council
- New York State Nurses Association

Organizations

- Citizen Action New York
- Lincoln Center Democratic Club
- New York League of Conservation Voters
- Stonewall Democrats
Yuh-Line Niou

U.S. senators

- Bernie Sanders, Vermont (2007–present) (Independent)

U.S. representatives

- Jamaal Bowman, former NY-16 (2021–2025)

State legislators

- Ron Kim, state assemblymember from the 40th district (2013–present)

Local officials

- Alexa Avilés, New York City Council member from the 38th district (2022–present)
- Tiffany Cabán, New York City Council member from the 22nd district (2022–present)
- Shahana Hanif, New York City Council member from the 39th district (2022–present)
- Brad Lander, former New York City comptroller (2022–2025)
- Chi Ossé, New York City Council member from the 36th district (2022–present)
- Jumaane Williams, New York City Public Advocate (2019–present)

Individuals

- Cynthia Nixon, actor

Labor unions

- Communications Workers of America District 1

Organizations

- Our Revolution
- Sunrise NYC

Political parties

- Working Families Party

==== Results ====
2026 New York State Senate Democratic primary, District 27
Party	Candidate	Votes	%
Democratic	Grace Lee	18,832	62.1
Democratic	Yuh-Line Niou	11,429	37.7
Write-in		88	0.3
Total votes		30,349	100.0

=== Republican primary ===
==== Nominee ====
- Jason Murillo

=== Working Families primary ===
==== Nominee ====
- Yuh-Line Niou, former state assemblymember from the 65th district (2017–2022)

== District 28 ==
2026 New York's 28th State Senate district election
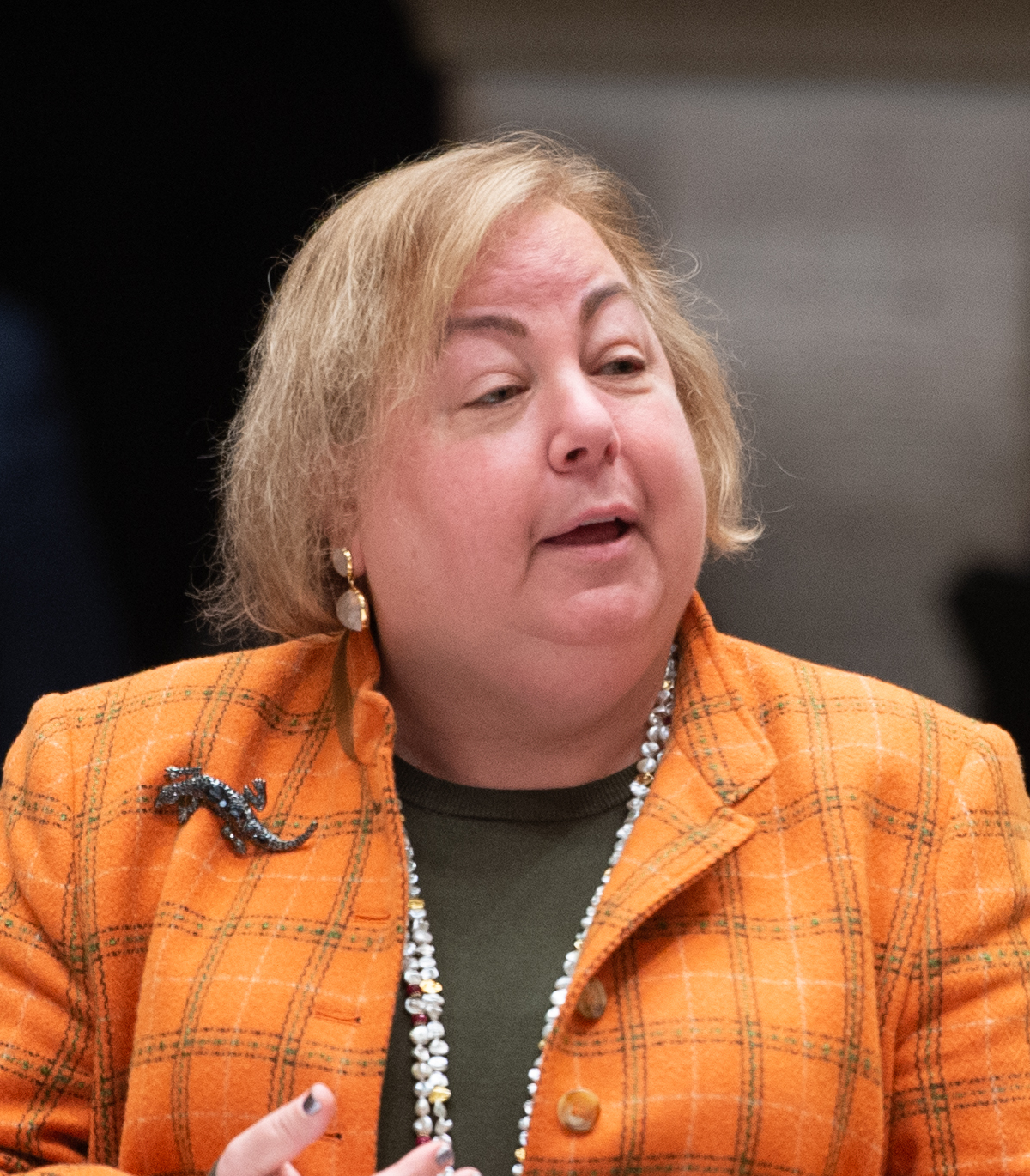

Nominee	Liz Krueger	Alina Bonsell
Party	Democratic	Republican
Incumbent Senator
Liz Krueger
Democratic

The 28th district covers much of the Upper East Side of Manhattan and Midtown, including portions of Gramercy and Murray Hill. The incumbent is Democrat Liz Krueger, who was re-elected to a twelfth full term with 75.88% of the vote in 2024.

=== Democratic primary ===
==== Nominee ====
- Liz Krueger, incumbent senator

=== Republican primary ===
==== Nominee ====
- Alina Bonsell, candidate for New York City Council in 2025

== District 29 ==
2026 New York's 29th State Senate district election
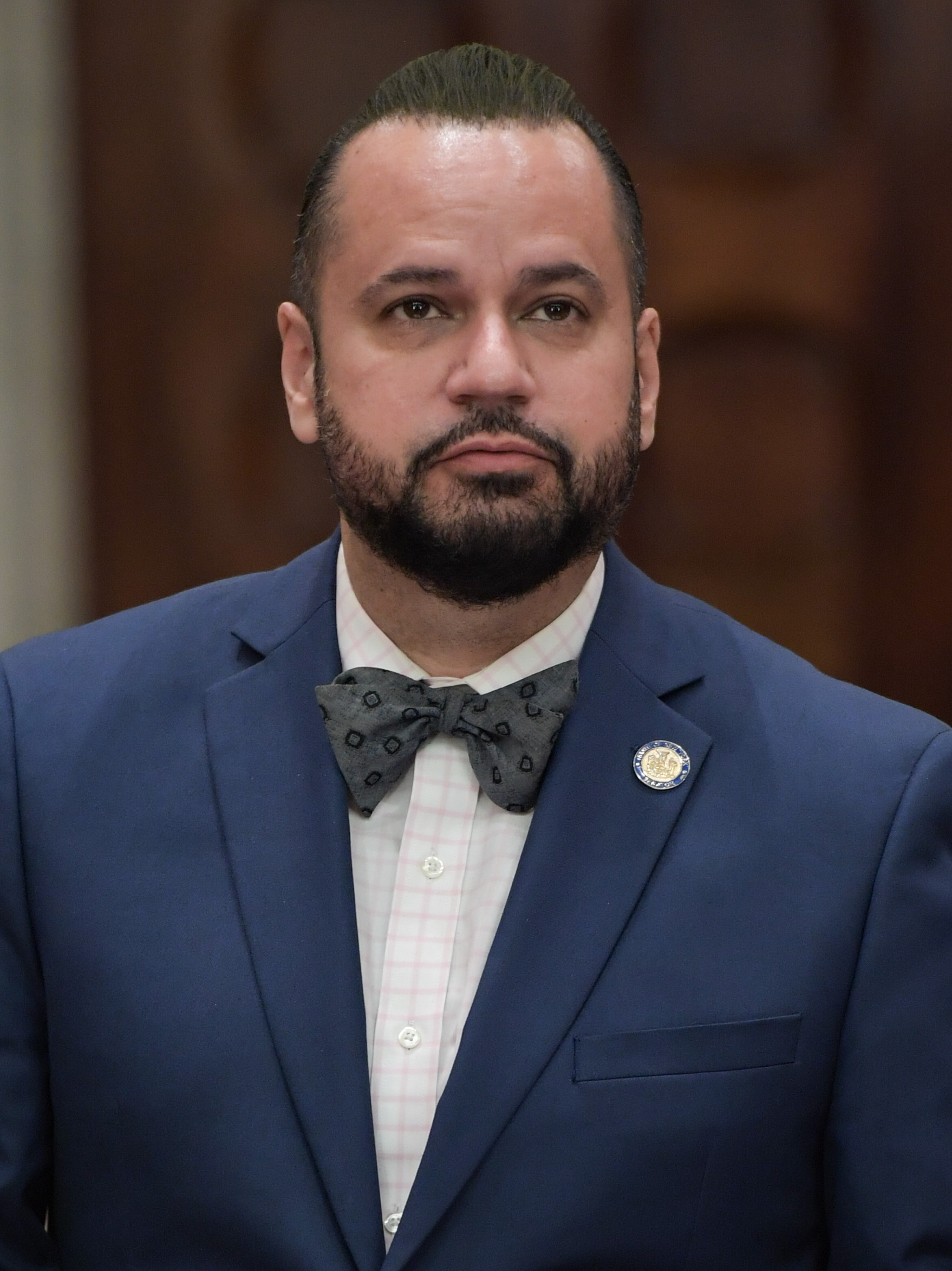
Nominee	José M. Serrano
Party	Democratic
Alliance	Working Families
Incumbent Senator
José M. Serrano
Democratic

The 29th district covers much of the South Bronx and upper Manhattan, as well as Randalls and Wards Islands, Roosevelt Island, and Central Park, including Mott Haven, Melrose, Highbridge, Morris Heights, East Harlem, Yorkville, and a small part of the Upper West Side. The incumbent is Democrat José M. Serrano, who was re-elected to an eleventh term with 81.7% of the vote in 2024.

=== Democratic primary ===
==== Nominee ====
- José M. Serrano, incumbent senator

==== Eliminated in primary ====
- Nicholas Reyes

==== Endorsements ====
José Serrano

Political parties

- New York Working Families Party

==== Results ====
2026 New York State Senate Democratic primary, District 29
Party	Candidate	Votes	%
Democratic	José M. Serrano (incumbent)	11,961	69.0
Democratic	Nicholas Reyes	5,238	30.2
Write-in		130	0.8
Total votes		17,329	100.0

== District 30 ==
2026 New York's 30th State Senate district election
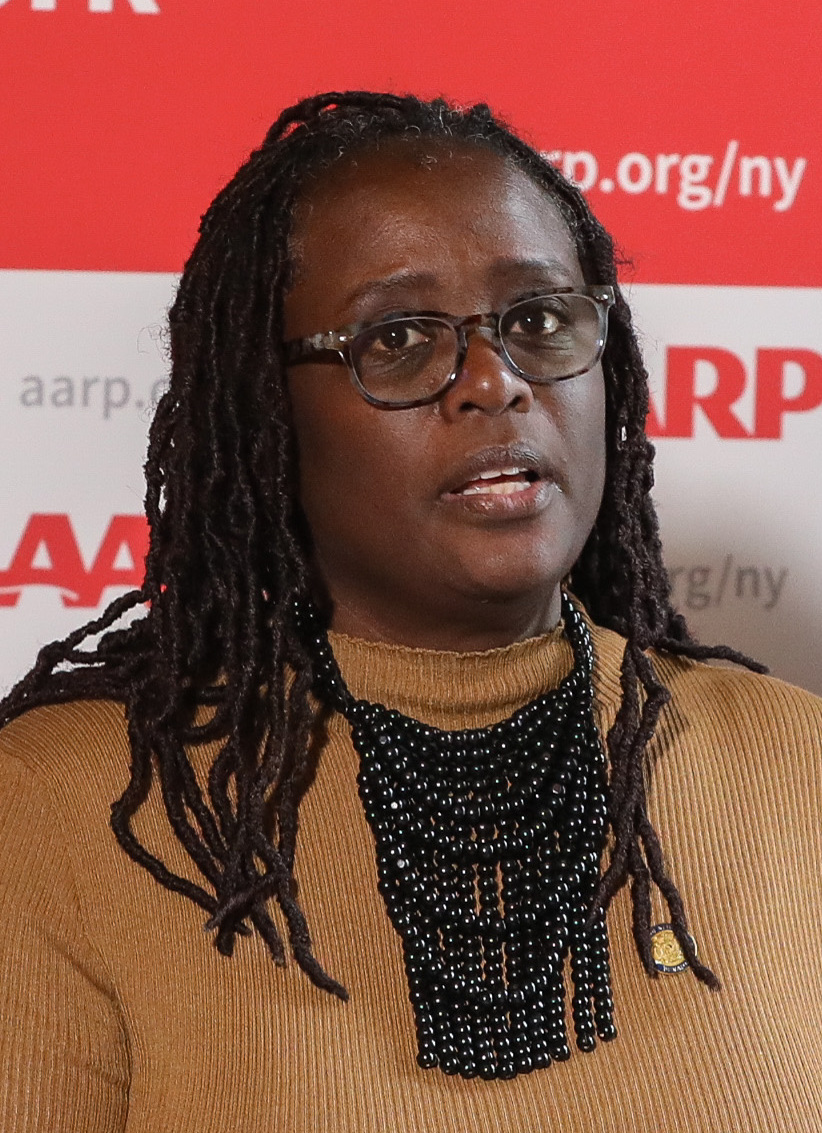
Nominee	Cordell Cleare
Party	Democratic
Alliance	Working Families
Incumbent Senator
Cordell Cleare
Democratic

The 30th district covers much of Harlem in northern Manhattan and portions of East Harlem, the Upper West Side, Morningside Heights, Hamilton Heights, and Washington Heights. The incumbent is Democrat Cordell Cleare, who was re-elected to a second full term with 99.53% of the vote in 2024.

=== Democratic primary ===
==== Nominee ====
- Cordell Cleare, incumbent senator

==== Endorsements ====
Cordell Cleare

Political parties

- New York Working Families Party

== District 31 ==
2026 New York's 31st State Senate district election
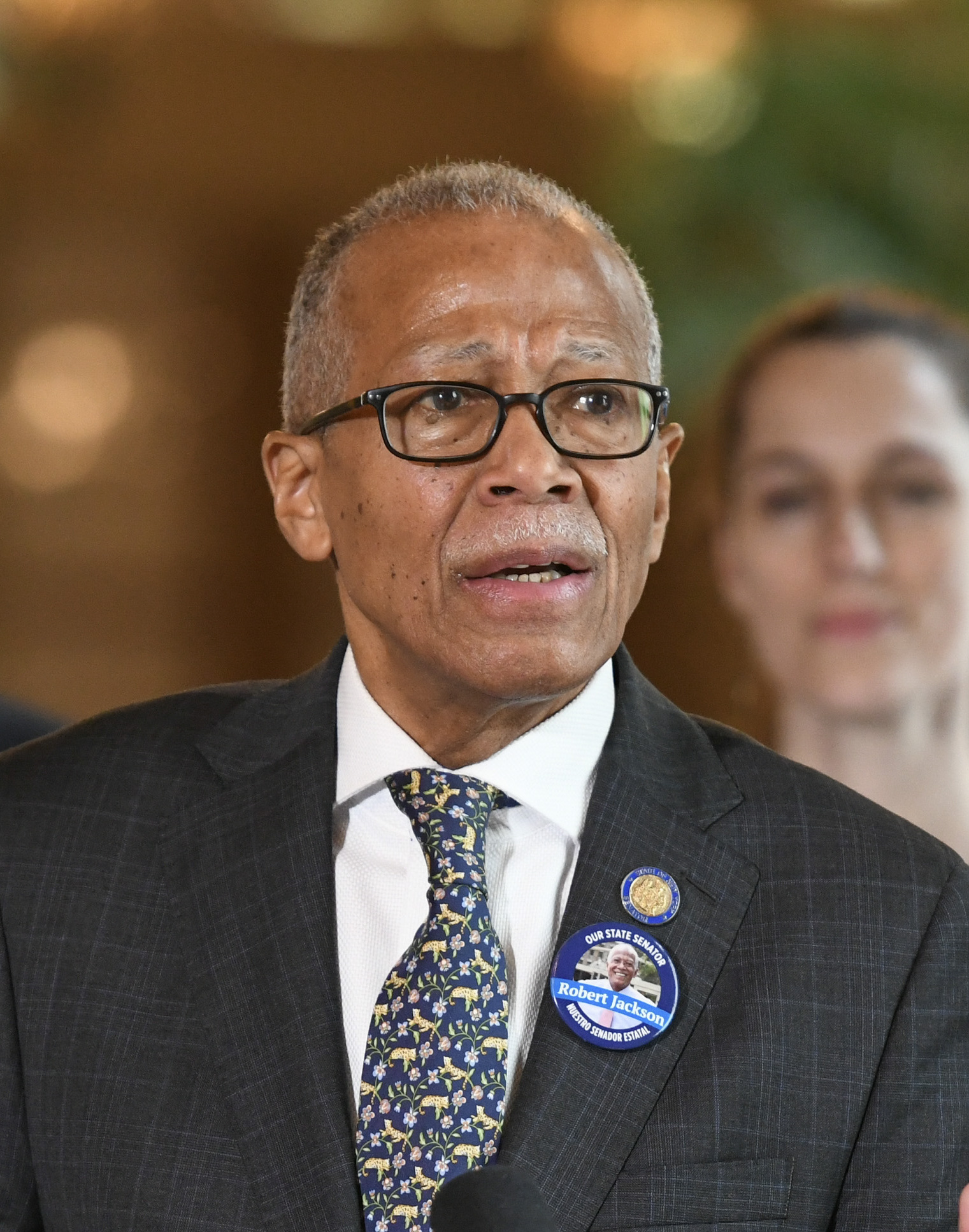
Nominee	Robert Jackson
Party	Democratic
Alliance	Working Families
Incumbent Senator
Robert Jackson
Democratic

The 31st district covers the northern Manhattan neighborhoods of Washington Heights, Inwood, and Marble Hill, stretching south along the Hudson River to include parts of Hamilton Heights, Harlem, Morningside Heights, the Upper West Side, Hell's Kitchen, and Chelsea. The incumbent is Democrat Robert Jackson, who was re-elected to a fourth term with 99.33% of the vote in 2024.

=== Democratic primary ===
==== Nominee ====
- Robert Jackson, incumbent senator

==== Eliminated in primary ====
- Nayma Silver-Matos, candidate for this seat in 2022

==== Endorsements ====
Robert Jackson

Political parties

- New York Working Families Party

==== Results ====
2026 New York State Senate Democratic primary, District 31
Party	Candidate	Votes	%
Democratic	Robert Jackson (incumbent)	18,882	71.9
Democratic	Nayma Silver-Matos	7,280	27.7
Write-in		108	0.4
Total votes		26,270	100.0

== District 32 ==
2026 New York's 32nd State Senate district election
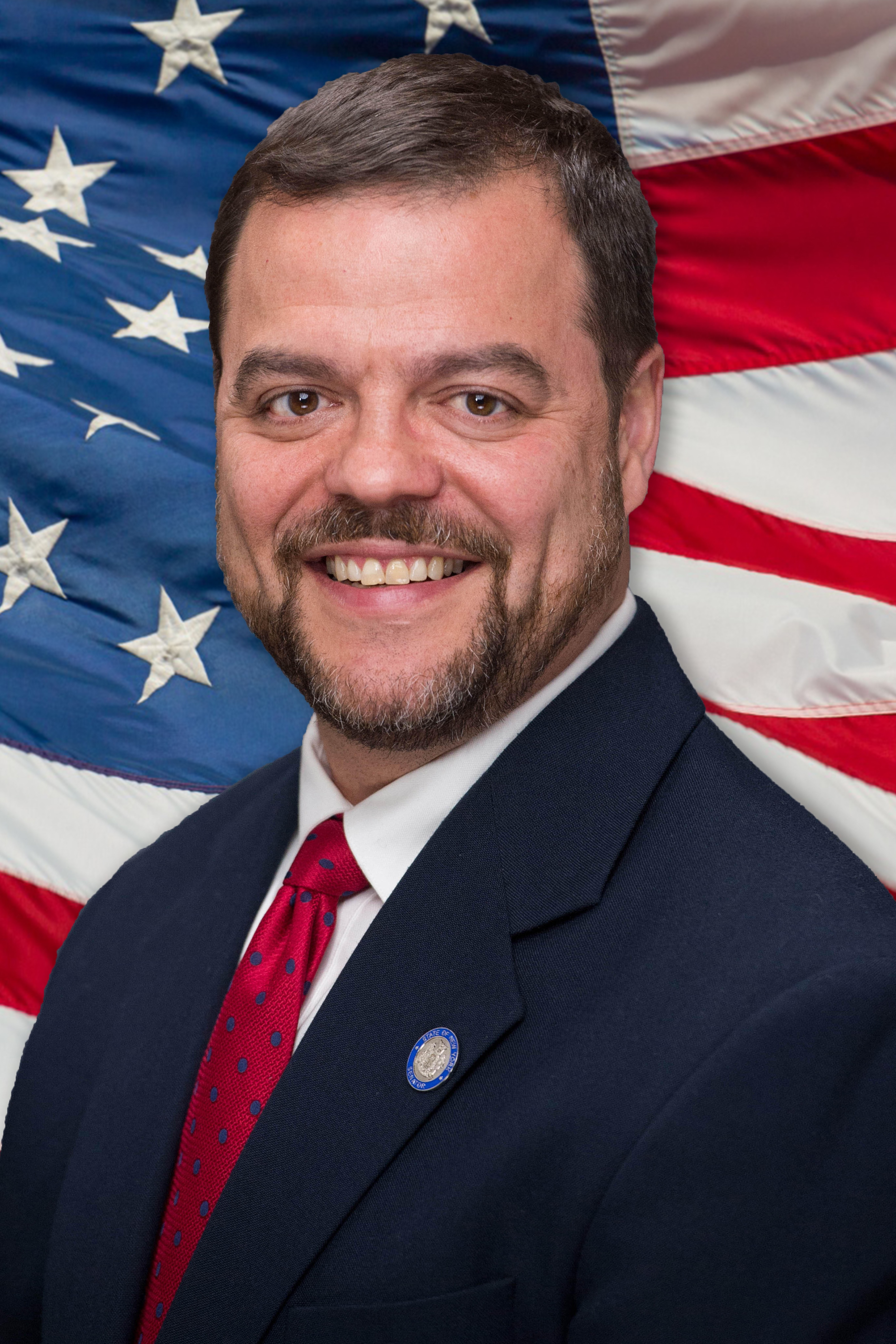
Nominee	Luis R. Sepúlveda
Party	Democratic
Incumbent Senator
Luis R. Sepúlveda
Democratic

The 32nd district covers the south and central Bronx, including portions of the neighborhoods of Parkchester, Soundview, West Farms, Hunts Point, Longwood, Concourse, Melrose, Morrisania, Mott Haven, East Tremont, and Westchester Square. The incumbent is Democrat Luis R. Sepúlveda, who was re-elected to a fourth full term with 79% of the vote in 2024.

=== Democratic primary ===
==== Nominee ====
- Luis Sepúlveda, incumbent senator

== District 33 ==
2026 New York's 33rd State Senate district election
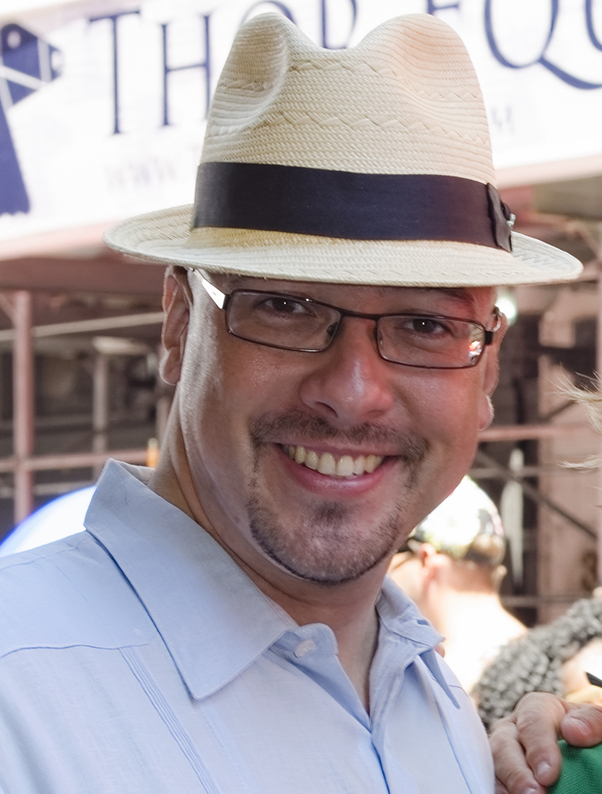
Nominee	Gustavo Rivera
Party	Democratic
Alliance	Working Families
Incumbent Senator
Gustavo Rivera
Democratic

The 33rd district covers the south and central Bronx, including portions of the neighborhoods of Kingsbridge Heights, Tremont, East Tremont, Crotona Park East, Fordham, Belmont, Van Nest, and Morris Park. The incumbent is Democrat Gustavo Rivera, who was re-elected to an eighth term with 74.69% of the vote in 2024.

=== Democratic primary ===
==== Nominee ====
- Gustavo Rivera, incumbent senator

==== Endorsements ====
Gustavo Rivera

Political parties

- New York Working Families Party

== District 34 ==
2026 New York's 34th State Senate district election
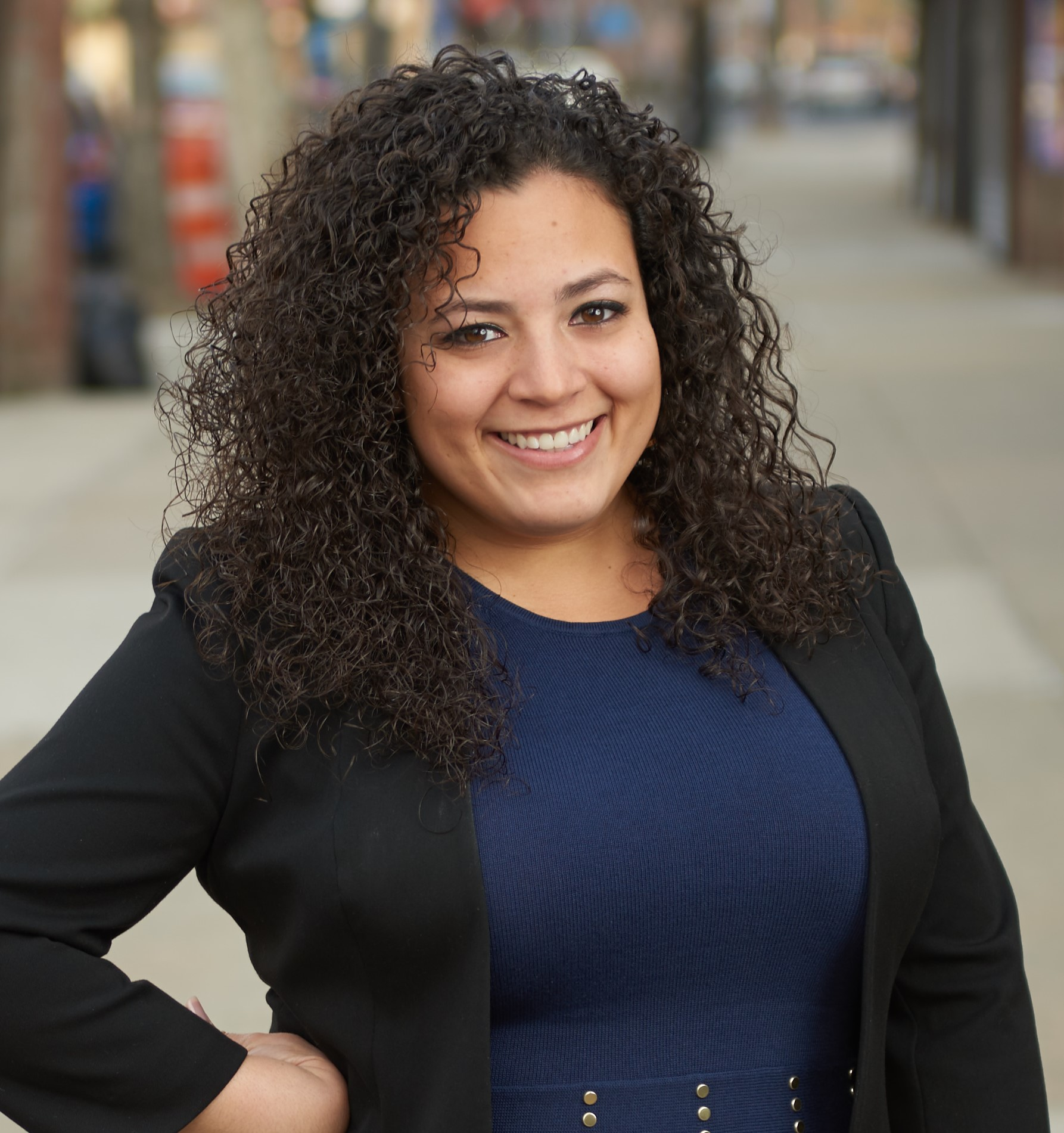

Nominee	Nathalia Fernandez	Adrian Romero
Party	Democratic	Conservative
Alliance	Working Families
Incumbent Senator
Nathalia Fernandez
Democratic

The 34th district covers the south and central Bronx, including portions of the neighborhoods of Kingsbridge Heights, Tremont, East Tremont, Crotona Park East, Fordham, Belmont, Van Nest, and Morris Park. The incumbent is Democrat Nathalia Fernandez, who was re-elected to a second term with 67.47% of the vote in 2024.

=== Democratic primary ===
==== Nominee ====
- Nathalia Fernandez, incumbent senator

==== Endorsements ====
Nathalia Fernandez

Political parties

- New York Working Families Party

=== Republican primary ===
==== Withdrawn or disqualified ====
- Adrian Romero

=== Conservative primary ===
==== Nominee ====
- Adrian Romero

== District 35 ==
2026 New York's 35th State Senate district election
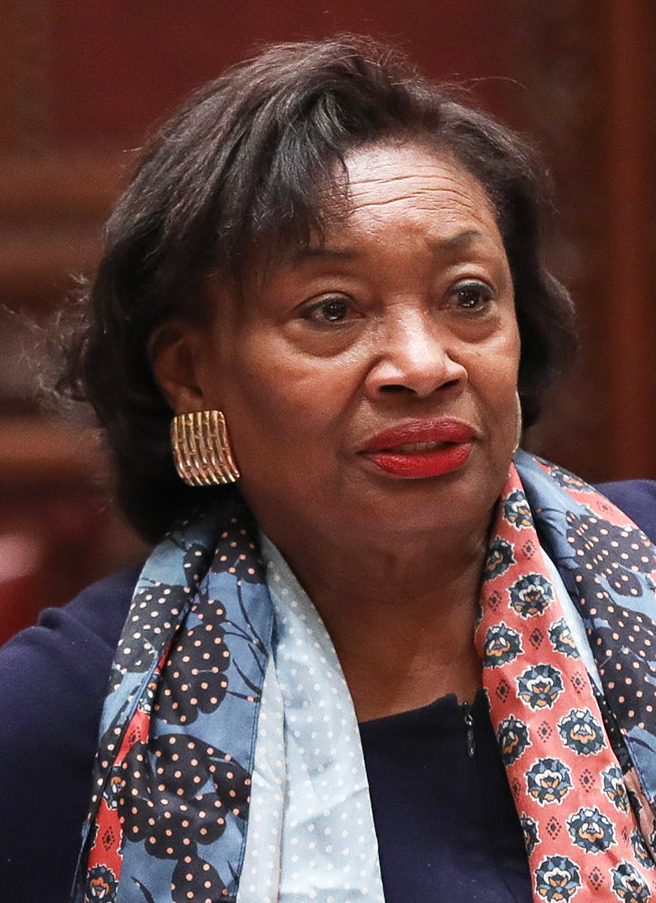

Nominee	Andrea Stewart-Cousins	Anthony Merante
Party	Democratic	Republican
Alliance	Working Families
Incumbent Senator
Andrea Stewart-Cousins
Democratic

The 35th district covers part of southern Westchester County, including all of Greenburgh and Scarsdale and parts of Yonkers, White Plains, and New Rochelle. The incumbent is Democrat Andrea Stewart-Cousins, who was re-elected to a tenth term with 66.14% of the vote in 2024.

=== Democratic primary ===
==== Nominee ====
- Andrea Stewart-Cousins, incumbent senator

==== Endorsements ====
Andrea Stewart-Cousins

Political parties

- New York Working Families Party

=== Republican primary ===
==== Nominee ====
- Anthony Merante, former Yonkers city councilman

=== Conservative primary ===
==== Withdrawn or disqualified ====
- Khristen Kerr, Republican candidate for this district in 2024

== District 36 ==
2026 New York's 36th State Senate district election
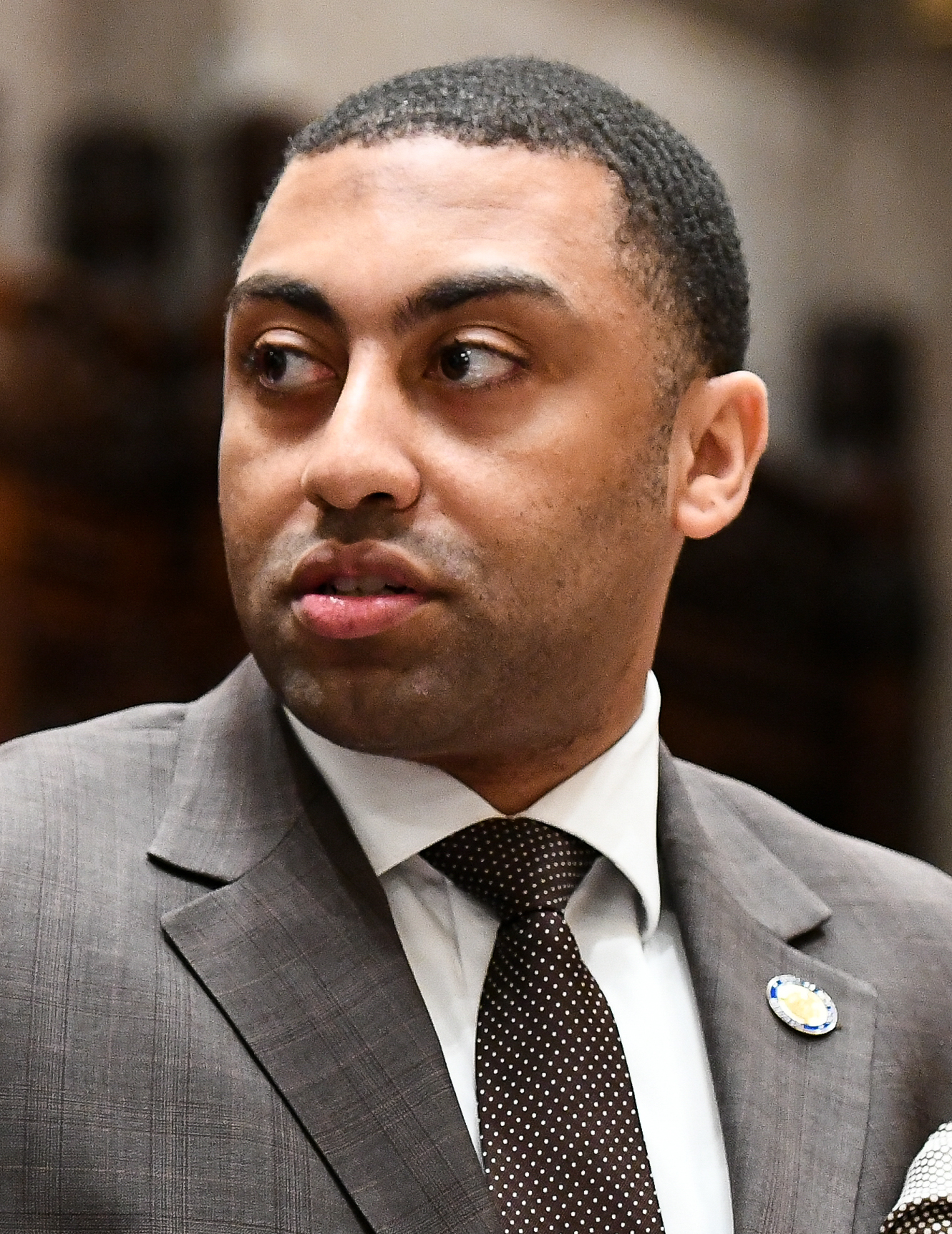

Nominee	Jamaal Bailey	Grace Marrero
Party	Democratic	Conservative
Incumbent Senator
Jamaal Bailey
Democratic

The 36th district covers much of the northern Bronx, including the neighborhoods of Bedford Park, Williamsbridge, Co-op City, Wakefield, and Baychester, as well as the southern Westchester County city of Mount Vernon. The incumbent is Democrat Jamaal Bailey, who was re-elected to a fifth term with 91.49% of the vote in 2024.

=== Democratic primary ===
==== Nominee ====
- Jamaal Bailey, incumbent senator

=== Republican primary ===
==== Withdrawn or disqualified ====
- Grace Marrero, former candidate for Bronx borough president

=== Conservative primary ===
==== Nominee ====
- Grace Marrero, former candidate for Bronx borough president

== District 37 ==
2026 New York's 37th State Senate district election
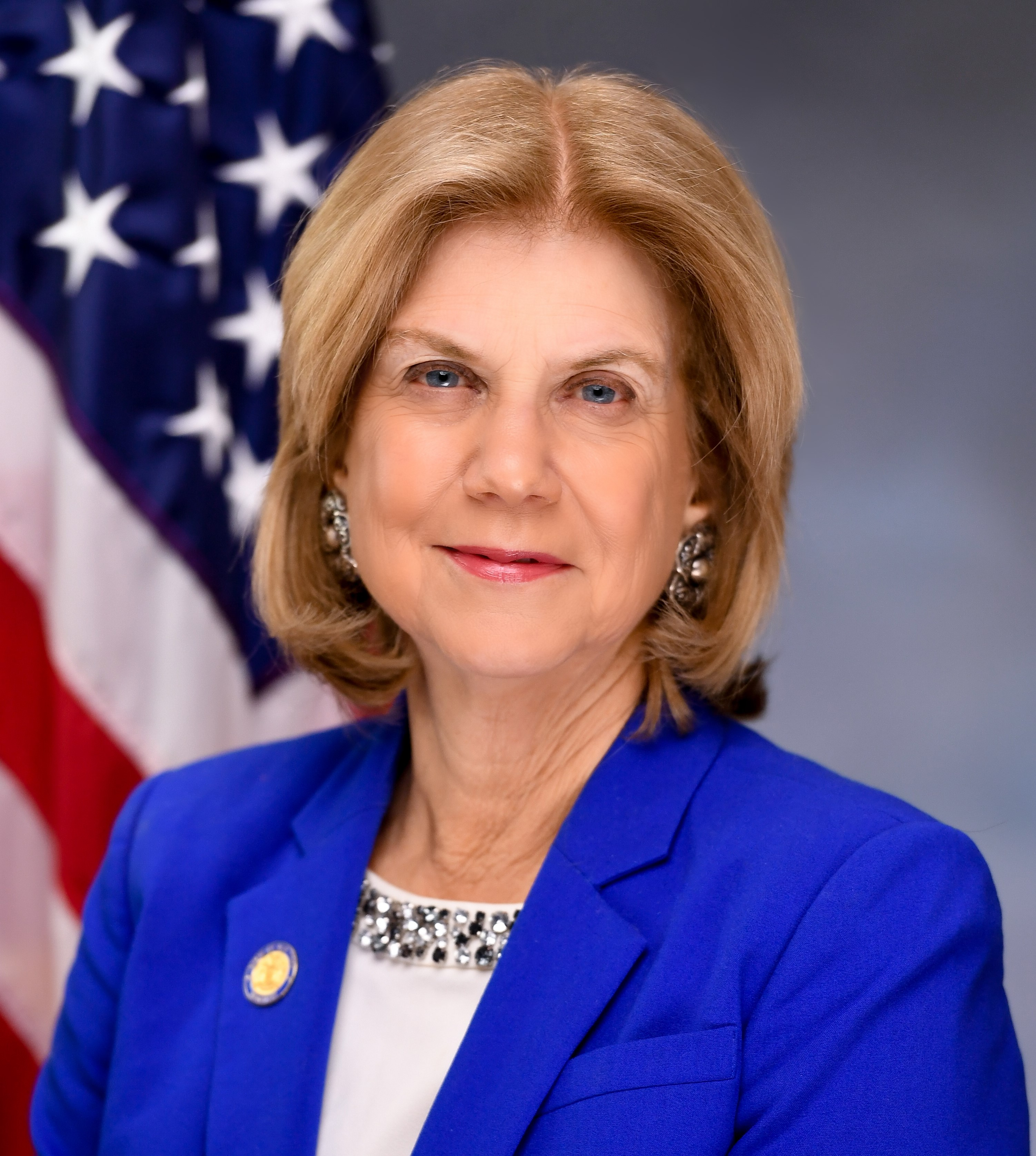

Nominee	Shelley Mayer	Thomas Fix Jr.
Party	Democratic	Republican
Alliance	Working Families
Incumbent Senator
Shelley Mayer
Democratic

The 37th district covers a portion of Westchester County, including parts of Bedford, Eastchester, Harrison, Larchmont, Mamaroneck, New Rochelle, North Castle, Port Chester, Rye, Rye Brook, White Plains, and Yonkers. The incumbent is Democrat Shelley Mayer, who was re-elected to a fourth full term with 61.73% of the vote in 2024.

=== Democratic primary ===
==== Nominee ====
- Shelley Mayer, incumbent senator

==== Endorsements ====
Shelley Mayer

Political parties

- New York Working Families Party

=== Republican primary ===
==== Nominee ====
- Thomas Fix, Jr.

=== Conservative primary ===
==== Withdrawn or disqualified ====
- Thomas Fix, Jr.

== District 38 ==
2026 New York's 38th State Senate district election
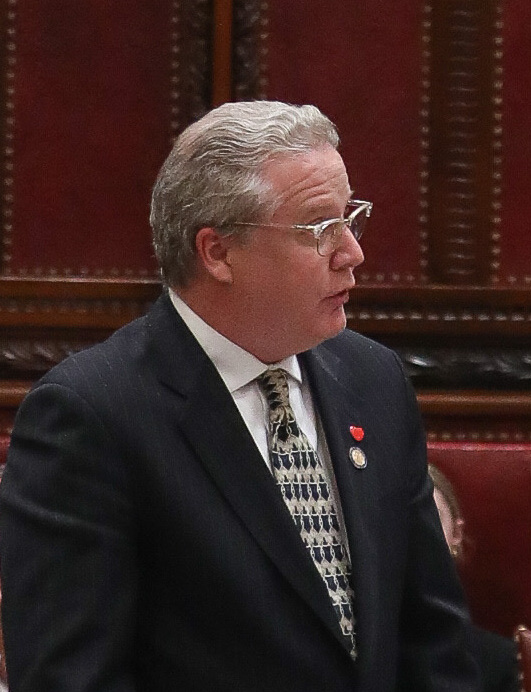

Nominee	Bill Weber	Joseph Rand
Party	Republican	Democratic
Alliance		Working Families
Incumbent Senator
Bill Weber
Republican

The 38th district covers much of Rockland County, including the towns of Orangetown, Clarkstown, and Ramapo; the district also crosses the Hudson River to incorporate a small part of Ossining in Westchester County. The incumbent is Republican Bill Weber, who was re-elected to a second term with 52.37% of the vote in 2024.

=== Republican primary ===
==== Nominee ====
- Bill Weber, incumbent senator

=== Democratic primary ===
==== Nominee ====
- Joseph Rand, mayor of Nyack

=== Working Families primary ===
==== Nominee ====
- Joseph Rand, mayor of Nyack

==== Eliminated in primary ====
- Shimon Weiss (write-in candidate)

==== Endorsements ====
Joseph Rand

Political parties

- New York Working Families Party

==== Results ====
2026 New York State Senate Working Families primary, District 38
Party	Candidate	Votes	%
Working Families	Joseph Rand	219	61.2
Working Families	Shimon Weiss (write-in)	133	37.2
Write-in		6	1.7
Total votes		358	100.0

== District 39 ==
2026 New York's 39th State Senate district election
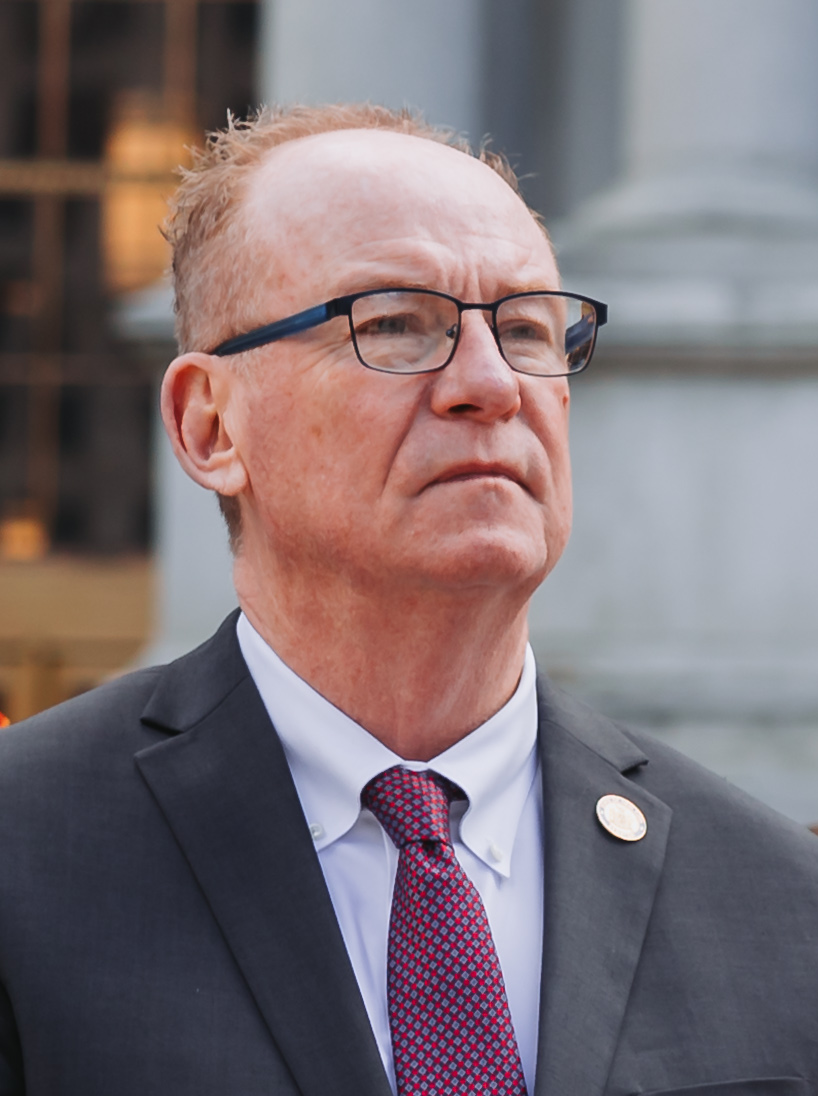

Nominee	Robert Rolison	Lisa Kaul	Evan R. Menist
Party	Republican	Democratic	Working Families
Alliance	Conservative
Incumbent Senator
Robert Rolison
Republican

The 39th district covers some portions of Dutchess, Orange, and Putnam counties, including the cities of Newburgh and Poughkeepsie. The incumbent is Republican Robert Rolison, who was re-elected to a second term with 50.67% of the vote in 2024.

=== Republican primary ===
==== Nominee ====
- Robert Rolison, incumbent senator

=== Democratic primary ===
==== Nominee ====
- Lisa Kaul, Dutchess County legislator

==== Eliminated in primary ====
- Gay Lee, social worker
- Evan R. Menist, Poughkeepsie common council member

==== Withdrawn ====
- Emma Arnoff, Dutchess County legislator

==== Results ====
2026 New York State Senate Democratic primary, District 39
Party	Candidate	Votes	%
Democratic	Lisa Kaul	8,257	62.1
Democratic	Evan R. Menist	4,045	30.4
Democratic	Gay Lee	980	7.4
Write-in		15	0.1
Total votes		13,297	100.0

=== Working Families primary ===
==== Nominee ====
- Evan R. Menist, Poughkeepsie common council member

==== Endorsements ====
Evan Menist

Political parties

- New York Working Families Party

== District 40 ==
2026 New York's 40th State Senate district election
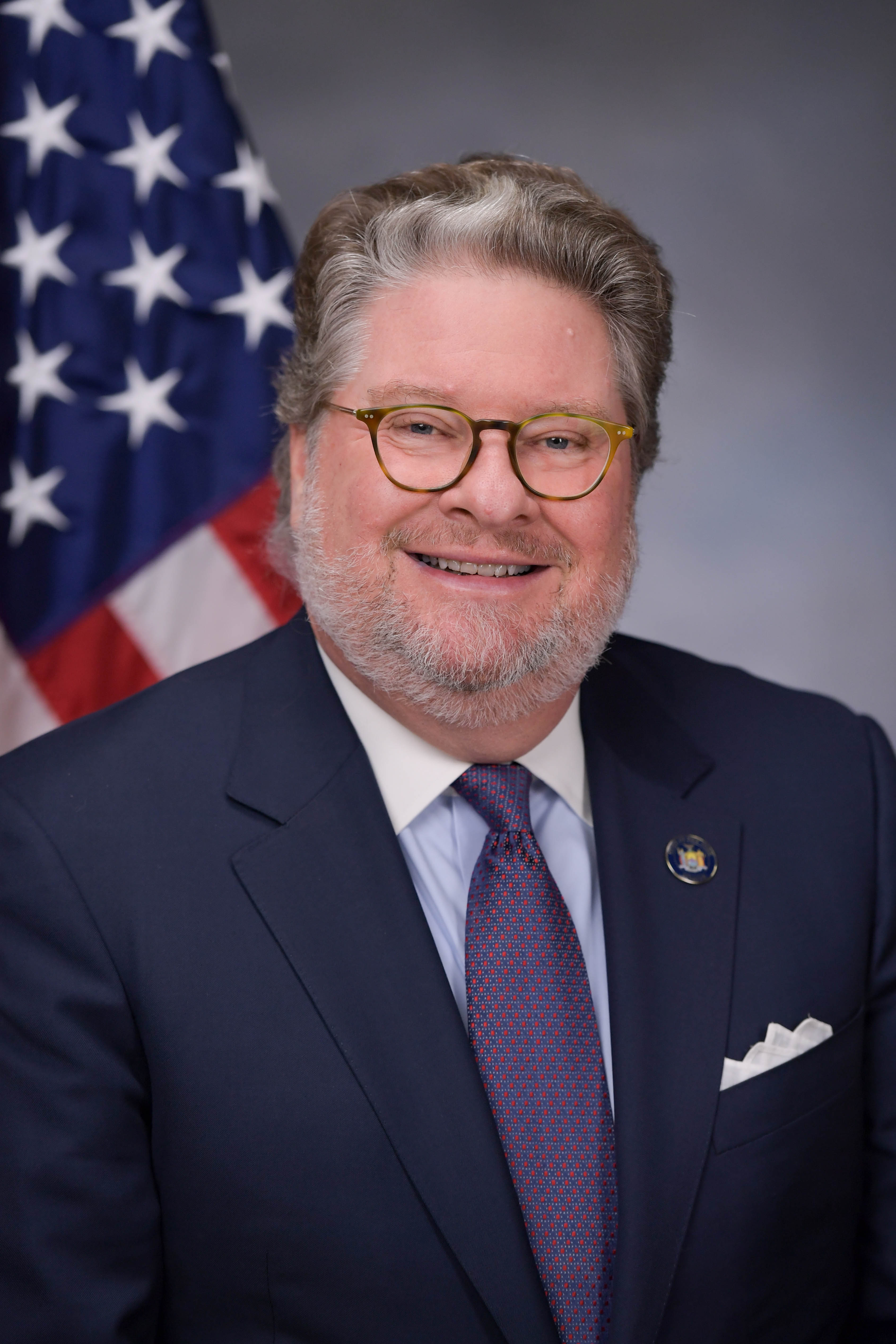

Nominee	Peter Harckham	Sergio Esposito
Party	Democratic	Republican
Alliance	Working Families	Conservative
Incumbent Senator
Peter Harckham
Democratic

The 40th district covers northern Westchester County, eastern Putnam County, and Dutchess County in the Hudson Valley. Including, the municipalities of Yorktown, Cortlandt, Somers, Peekskill, Carmel, Southeast, Patterson, Pawling, and Beekman. The incumbent is Democrat Peter Harckham, who was re-elected to a fourth term with 53.59% of the vote in 2024.

=== Democratic primary ===
==== Nominee ====
- Peter Harckham, incumbent senator

==== Endorsements ====
Peter Harckham

Political parties

- New York Working Families Party

=== Republican primary ===
==== Nominee ====
- Sergio Esposito, deputy supervisor of Yorktown

== District 41 ==
2026 New York's 41st State Senate district election
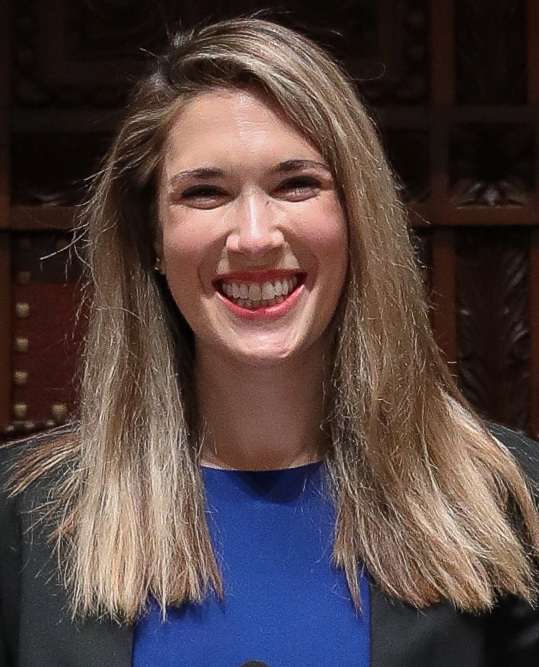

Nominee	Michelle Hinchey	Patrick Sheehan
Party	Democratic	Republican
Alliance	Working Families	Conservative
Incumbent Senator
Michelle Hinchey
Democratic

The 41st district covers almost all of Dutchess County, including the city and town of Poughkeepsie, and the western half of Putnam County. The incumbent is Democrat Michelle Hinchey, who was re-elected to a third term with 58.62% of the vote in 2024.

=== Democratic primary ===
==== Nominee ====
- Michelle Hinchey, incumbent senator

==== Endorsements ====
Michelle Hinchey

Political parties

- New York Working Families Party

=== Republican primary ===
==== Nominee ====
- Patrick Sheehan, candidate for this district in 2024 and for state assembly in 2024

== District 42 ==
2026 New York's 42nd State Senate district election
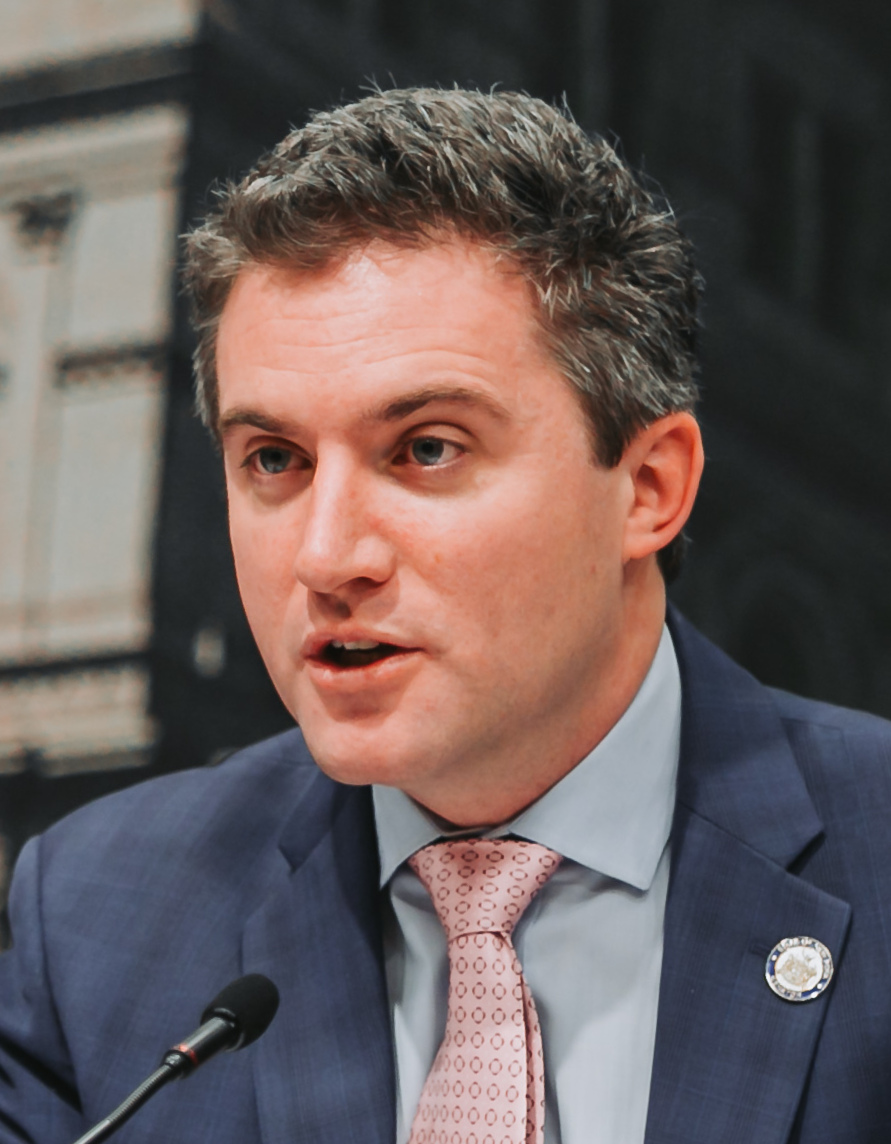

Nominee	James Skoufis	Jennifer R. Figueroa	Joshua Blumenthal
Party	Democratic	Republican	Conservative
Alliance	Working Families
Incumbent Senator
James Skoufis
Democratic

The 42nd district covers almost all of Orange County, including all of the southern and western portions of the county. The incumbent is Democrat James Skoufis, who was re-elected to a fourth term with 54.46% of the vote in 2024.

=== Democratic primary ===
==== Nominee ====
- James Skoufis, incumbent senator

==== Endorsements ====
James Skoufis

Political parties

- New York Working Families Party

=== Republican primary ===
==== Nominee ====
- Jennifer Figueroa

==== Withdrawn or disqualified ====
- Christopher Kasker, trustee of Tuxedo Park

=== Conservative primary ===
==== Nominee ====
- Joshua Blumenthal

==== Eliminated in primary ====
- Jennifer Figueroa

==== Withdrawn or disqualified ====
- Christopher Kasker, trustee of Tuxedo Park

==== Withdrawn ====
- Tim Mitts

==== Results ====
2026 New York State Senate Conservative primary, District 42
Party	Candidate	Votes	%
Conservative	Joshua Blumenthal (write-in)	422	62.5
Conservative	Jennifer R. Figueroa	240	35.6
Write-in		13	1.9
Total votes		675	100.0

== District 43 ==
2026 New York's 43rd State Senate district election
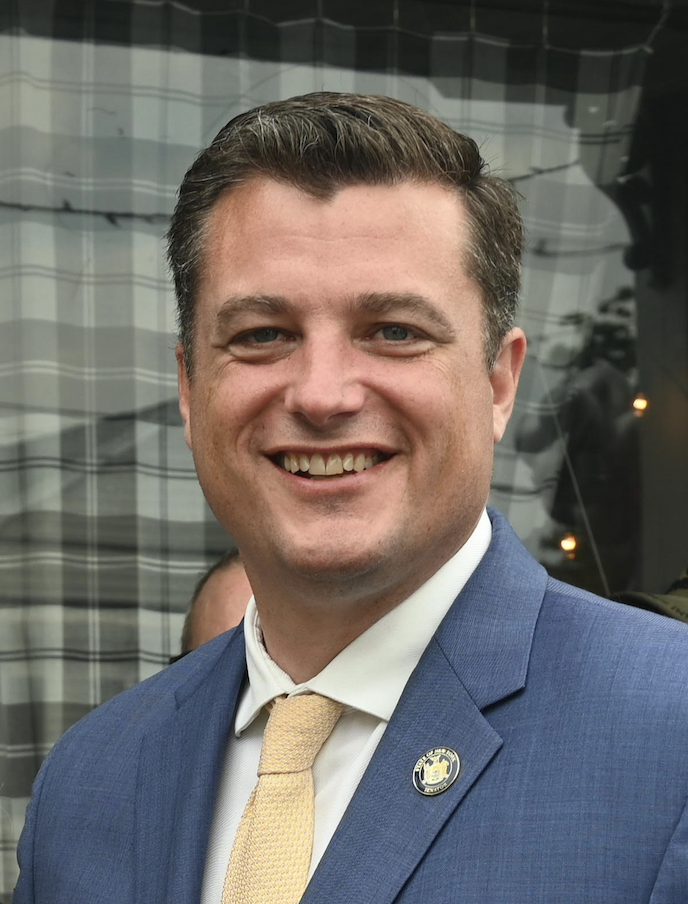

Nominee	Jake Ashby	Devin Lander
Party	Republican	Democratic
Alliance	Conservative	Working Families
Incumbent Senator
Jake Ashby
Republican

The 43rd district covers all of Rensselaer County, most of Washington County, and the northeast corner in Albany County. The incumbent is Republican Jake Ashby, who was re-elected to a second term with 54.61% of the vote in 2024.

=== Republican primary ===
==== Nominee ====
- Jake Ashby, incumbent senator

=== Democratic primary ===
==== Nominee ====
- Devin Lander, New York State historian

==== Endorsements ====
Devin Lander

Political parties

- New York Working Families Party

== District 44 ==
2026 New York's 44th State Senate district election
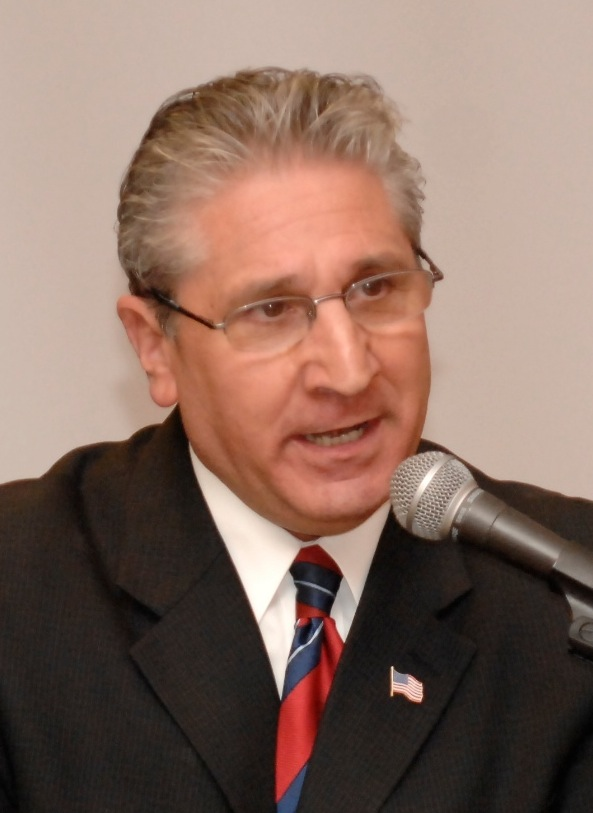

Nominee	Jim Tedisco	Sarah F. Rogerson
Party	Republican	Democratic
Alliance	Conservative	Working Families
Incumbent Senator
Jim Tedisco
Republican

The 44th district covers some portions of Saratoga and Schenectady counties, including the city of Schenectady. The incumbent is Republican Jim Tedisco, who was re-elected to a fifth term with 57.85% of the vote in 2024.

=== Republican primary ===
==== Nominee ====
- Jim Tedisco, incumbent senator

=== Democratic primary ===
==== Nominee ====
- Sarah F. Rogerson

==== Eliminated in primary ====
- Patrick F. Nelson, candidate for this district in 2020

==== Endorsements ====
Sarah Rogerson

Political parties

- New York Working Families Party

==== Results ====
2026 New York State Senate Democratic primary, District 44
Party	Candidate	Votes	%
Democratic	Sarah F. Rogerson	8,603	68.4
Democratic	Patrick F. Nelson	3,957	31.4
Write-in		23	0.2
Total votes		12,583	100.0

== District 45 ==
2026 New York's 45th State Senate district election
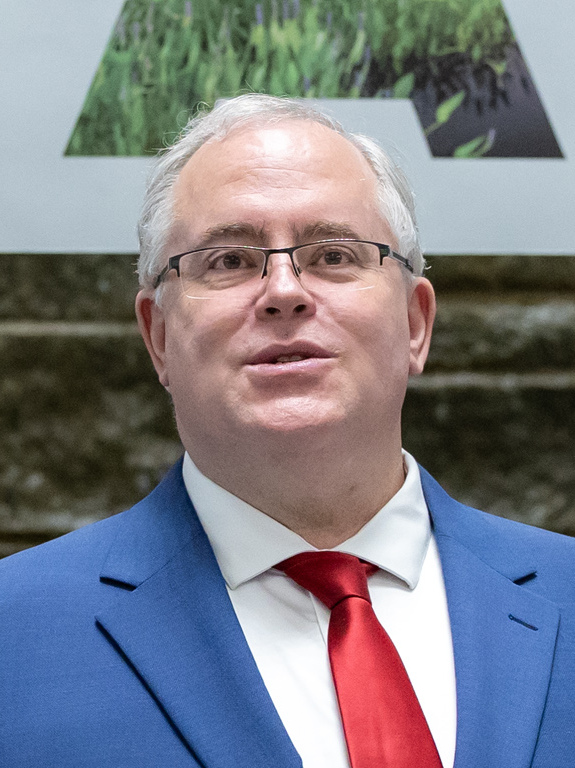

Nominee	Dan Stec	Melissa Seale
Party	Republican	Democratic
Alliance	Conservative	Working Families
Incumbent Senator
Dan Stec
Republican

The 45th district covers a large portion of northeastern New York's North County and Capital District, including all of Clinton, Essex, Franklin, and Warren counties, and parts of St. Lawrence and Washington counties. The district, which contains Plattsburgh and Queensbury, reaches the northernmost point in the state. The incumbent is Republican Dan Stec, who was re-elected to a third term with 99.01% of the vote in 2024.

=== Republican primary ===
==== Nominee ====
- Dan Stec, incumbent senator

=== Democratic primary ===
==== Nominee ====
- Melissa Seale, small business owner

==== Endorsements ====
Melissa Seale

Political parties

- New York Working Families Party

== District 46 ==
2026 New York's 46th State Senate district election
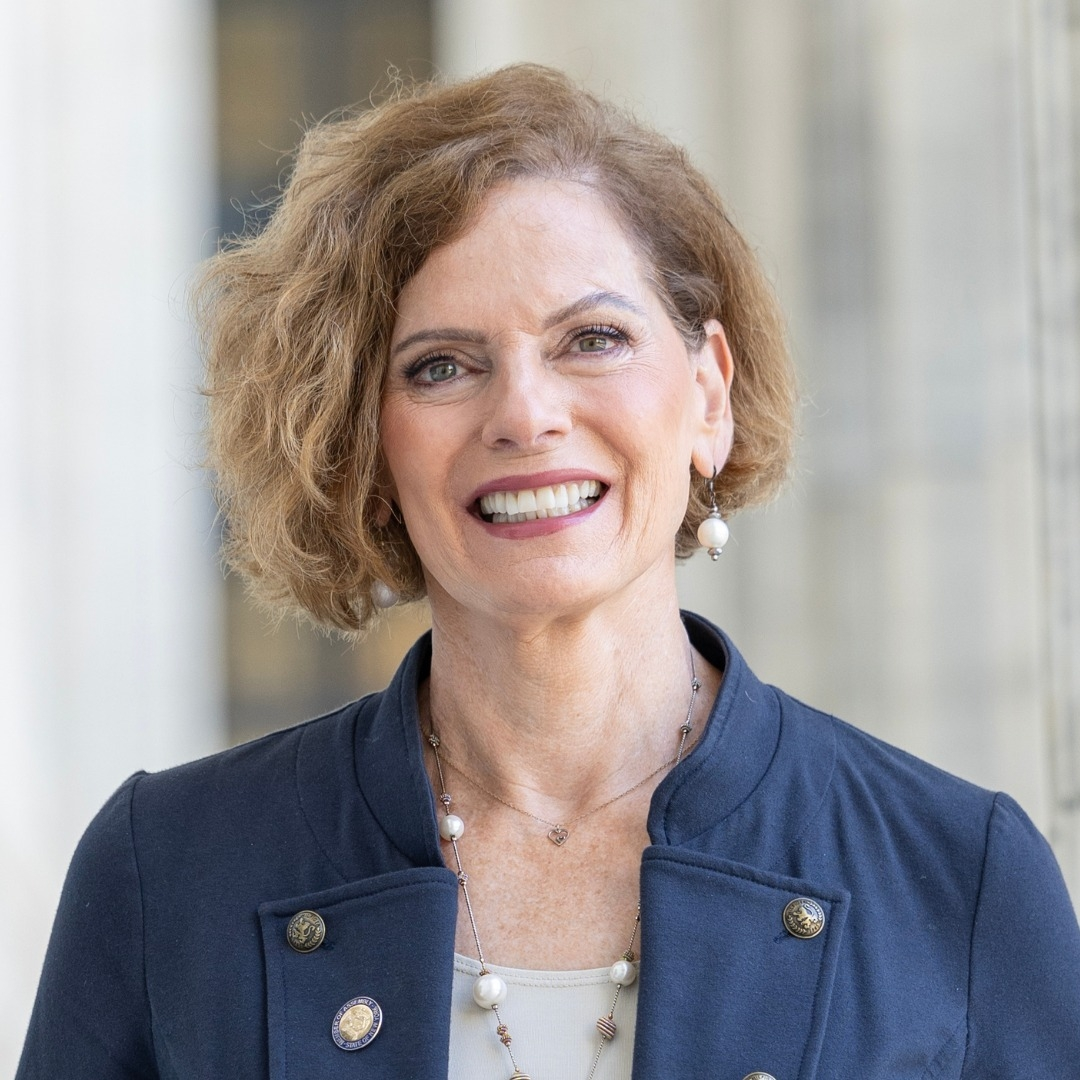

Nominee	Patricia Fahy	Martha McHugh
Party	Democratic	Republican
Alliance	Working Families	Conservative
Incumbent Senator
Patricia Fahy
Democratic

The 46th district covers a portion of western Capital District, including all of Montgomery County and parts of Albany and Schenectady, dominated by the state capital, Albany. The incumbent is Democrat Patricia Fahy, who defeated Republican Theodore Danz Jr. to succeed fourteen-term Democratic incumbent Neil Breslin with 55.87% of the vote in 2024.

=== Democratic primary ===
==== Nominee ====
- Patricia Fahy, incumbent senator

=== Republican primary ===
==== Nominee ====
- Martha McHugh, former New York State assistant commissioner of health

== District 47 ==
2026 New York's 47th State Senate district election
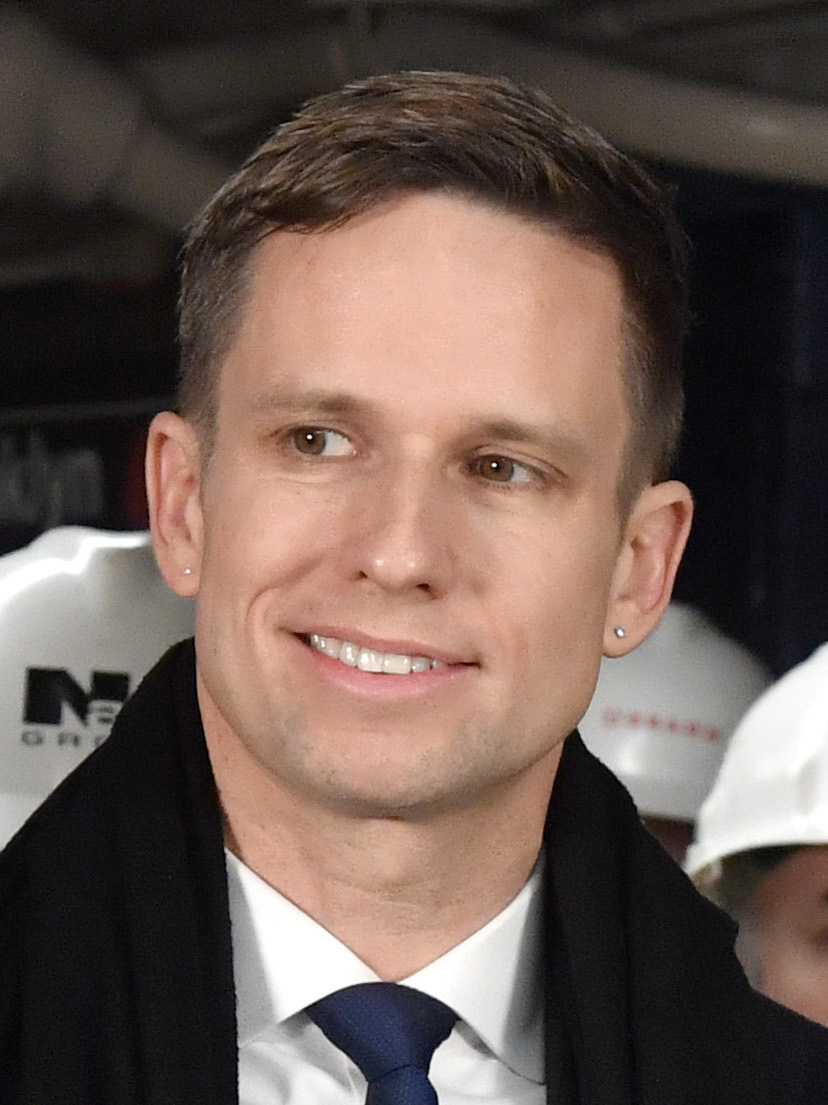

Nominee	Erik Bottcher	Charlotte Friedman	aEmily YueXin Miller
Party	Democratic	Republican	Conservative
Alliance	Working Families
Incumbent Senator
Erik Bottcher
Democratic

The 47th district is located in Manhattan, covering portions of the Upper West Side, Chelsea, and Hell's Kitchen and portions of West Village. The incumbent is Democrat Erik Bottcher, who was elected in a special election with 91.66% of the vote in February 2026.

In 2024, incumbent Democratic senator Brad Hoylman-Sigal won re-election to a seventh term with 83.78% of the vote. On December 31, 2025, he resigned from the state senate to become the Manhattan borough president after winning the general election on November 4. On February 3, 2026, Democrat Erik Bottcher won the special election with 91.66% of the vote against Republican Charlotte Friedman to succeed Hoylman-Sigal. Bottcher was sworn in on February 4.

=== Democratic primary ===
==== Nominee ====
- Erik Bottcher, incumbent senator

==== Endorsements ====
Erik Bottcher

Organization

- Stonewall Democrats

Political parties

- New York Working Families Party

=== Republican primary ===
==== Nominee ====
- Charlotte Friedman, nominee for this district in the 2026 special election

=== Conservative primary ===
==== Nominee ====
- aEmily YueXin Miller, Republican nominee for this district in 2024

== District 48 ==
2026 New York's 48th State Senate district election
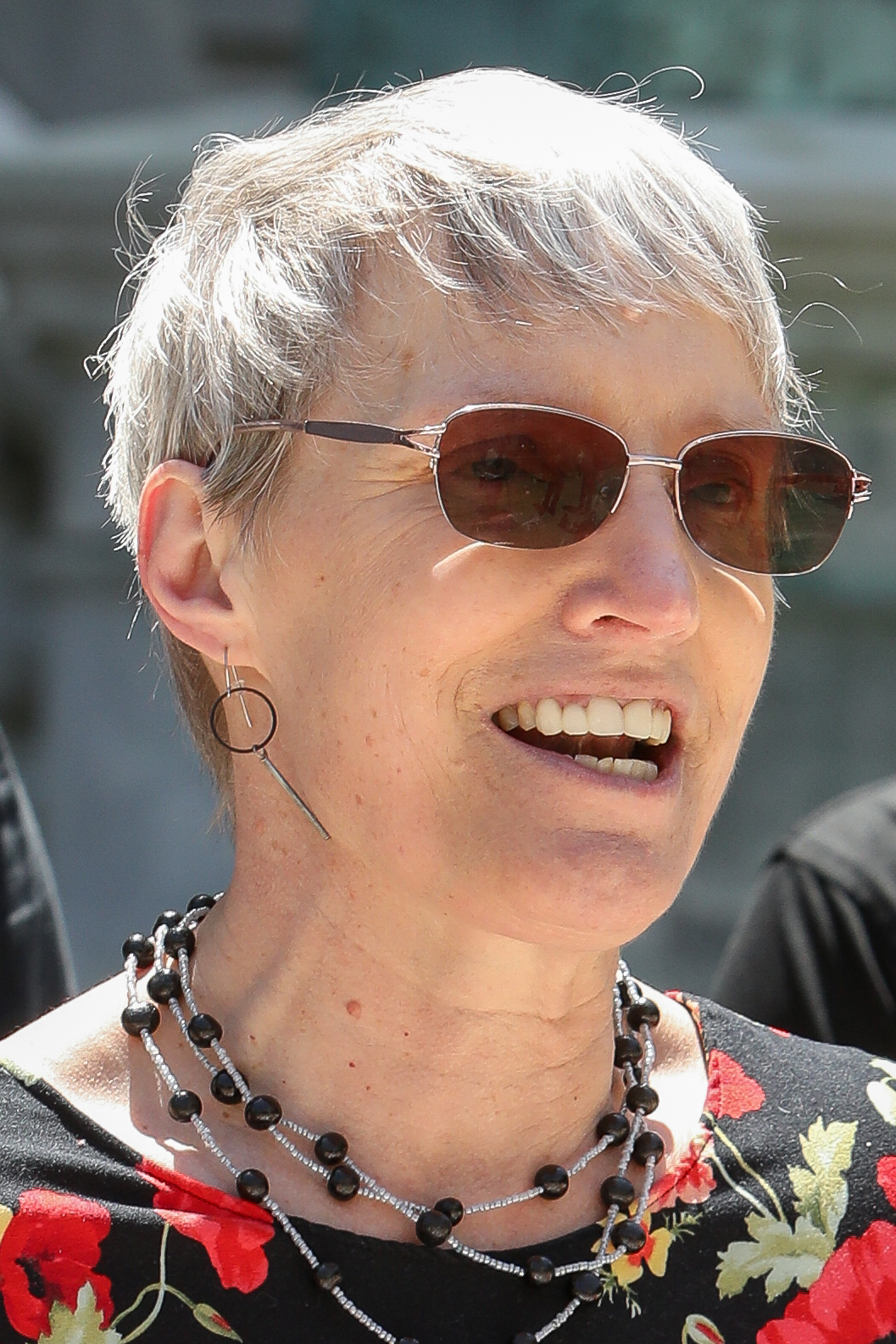

Nominee	Rachel May	Richard McCarron Jr.
Party	Democratic	Republican
Alliance	Working Families	Conservative
Incumbent Senator
Rachel May
Democratic

The 48th district covers portions of Cayuga and Onondaga counties, including the city of Syracuse. The incumbent is Democrat Rachel May, who was re-elected to a fourth term with 58.4% of the vote in 2024.

=== Democratic primary ===
==== Nominee ====
- Rachel May, incumbent senator

==== Endorsements ====
Rachel May

Political parties

- New York Working Families Party

=== Republican primary ===
==== Nominee ====
- Richard McCarron Jr., Onondaga County legislator

== District 49 ==
2026 New York's 49th State Senate district election
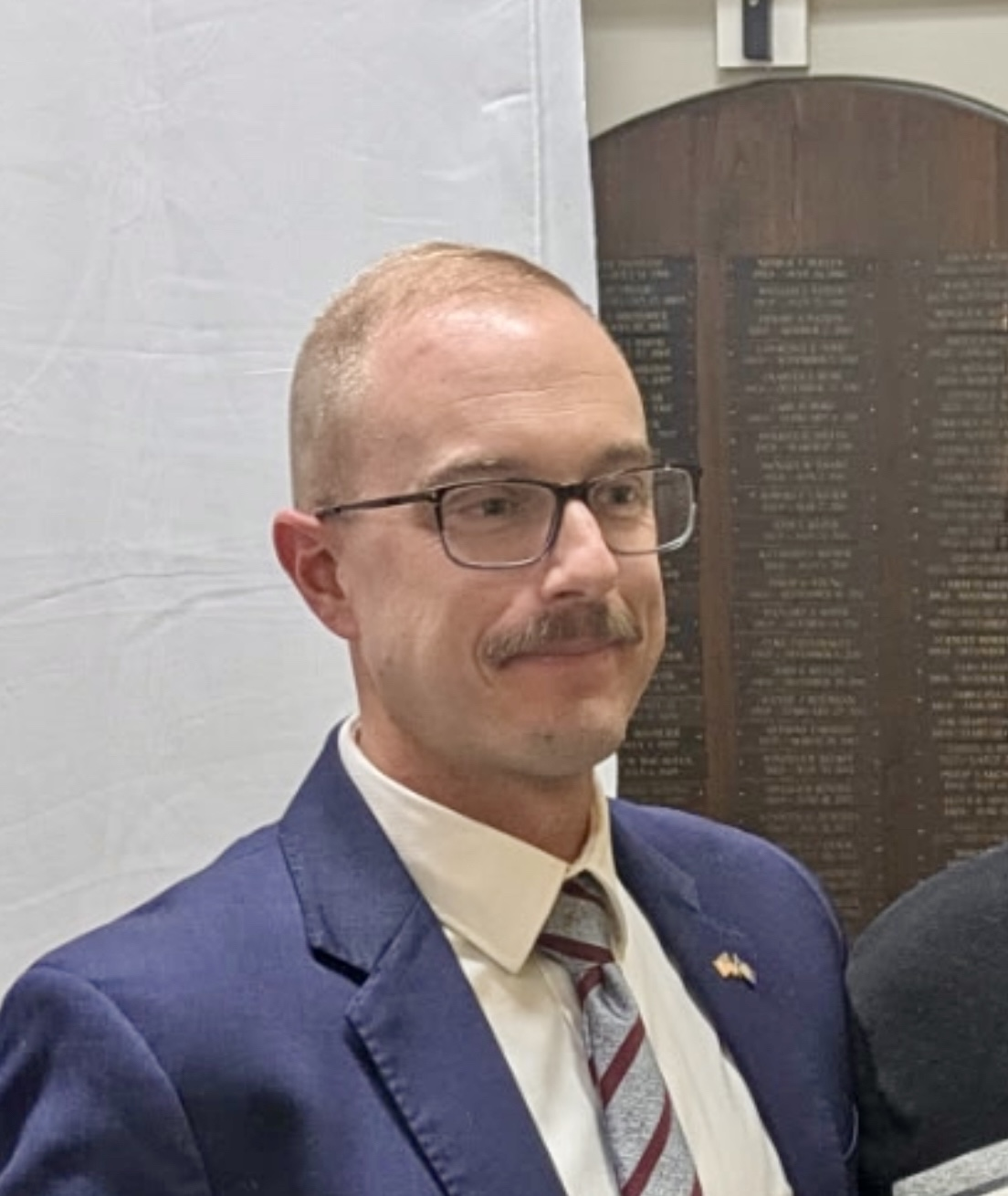

Nominee	Mark Walczyk	Cassie Robbins-Forbus
Party	Republican	Democratic
Alliance	Conservative	Working Families
Incumbent Senator
Mark Walczyk
Republican

The 49th district covers all of Fulton, Hamilton, Jefferson, and Lewis counties, as well as parts of Herkimer, Oswego, and St. Lawrence counties. The incumbent is Republican Mark Walczyk, who was re-elected to a second term with 99.45% of the vote in 2024.

=== Republican primary ===
==== Nominee ====
- Mark Walczyk, incumbent senator

=== Democratic primary ===
==== Nominee ====
- Cassie Robbins-Forbus, grant writer

==== Endorsements ====
Cassie Robbins-Forbus

Political parties

- New York Working Families Party

== District 50 ==
2026 New York's 50th State Senate district election
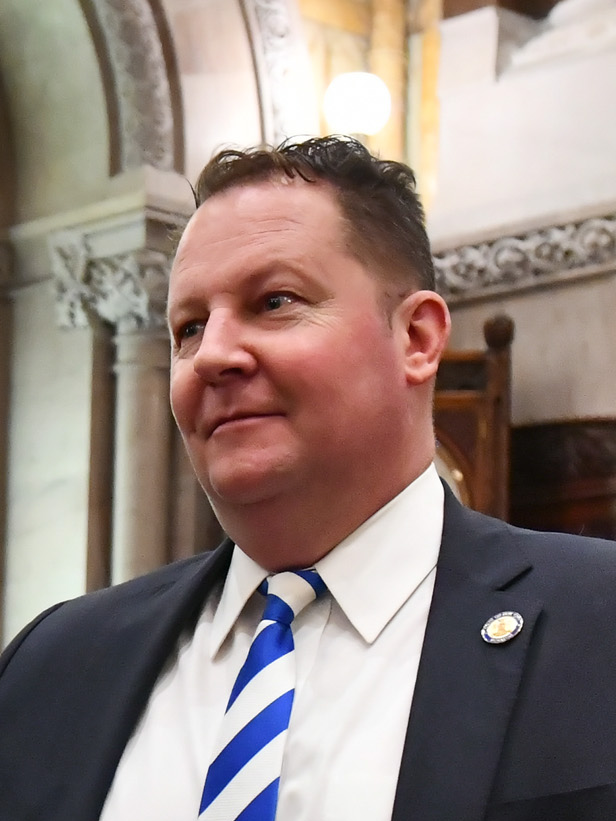

Nominee	Chris Ryan	James Corl
Party	Democratic	Republican
Alliance	Working Families	Conservative
Incumbent Senator
Chris Ryan
Democratic

The 50th district covers parts of Onondaga and Oswego counties, centered on the suburbs of the city of Syracuse. The incumbent is Democrat Chris Ryan, who defeated Republican Nick Paro to succeed two-full-term Democratic incumbent John Mannion with 50.43% of the vote in 2024.

=== Democratic primary ===
==== Nominee ====
- Chris Ryan, incumbent senator

==== Endorsements ====
Chris Ryan

Political parties

- New York Working Families Party

=== Republican primary ===
==== Nominee ====
- James Corl, state senate office worker

== District 51 ==
2026 New York's 51st State Senate district election

Nominee	Christopher Tague	Michele Frazier
Party	Republican	Democratic
Alliance	Conservative	Working Families
Incumbent Senator
Peter Oberacker
Republican

The 51st district covers all of Cortland, Otsego, and Schoharie counties, as well as parts of Cayuga, Chenango, Delaware, Herkimer, Tompkins, and Ulster counties. The incumbent is Republican Peter Oberacker, who was re-elected to a third term with 59.33% of the vote in 2024.

=== Republican primary ===
==== Nominee ====
- Christopher Tague, state assemblyman from the 102nd district (2018–present)

==== Eliminated in primary ====
- Terry Blosser-Bernardo, Sullivan County legislator

==== Declined ====
- Peter Oberacker, incumbent senator (running for the U.S. House of Representatives)

==== Results ====
2026 New York State Senate Republican primary, District 51
Party	Candidate	Votes	%
Republican	Christopher Tague	6,631	53.9
Republican	Terry Blosser-Bernardo	5,663	46.0
Write-in		15	0.1
Total votes		12,309	100.0

=== Democratic primary ===
==== Nominee ====
- Michele Frazier, former Oneonta, New York city councilwoman, candidate for this district in 2024

==== Withdrawn ====
- Chris Hewitt, Ulster County legislator

==== Endorsements ====
Michele Frazier

Political parties

- New York Working Families Party

== District 52 ==
2026 New York's 52nd State Senate district election
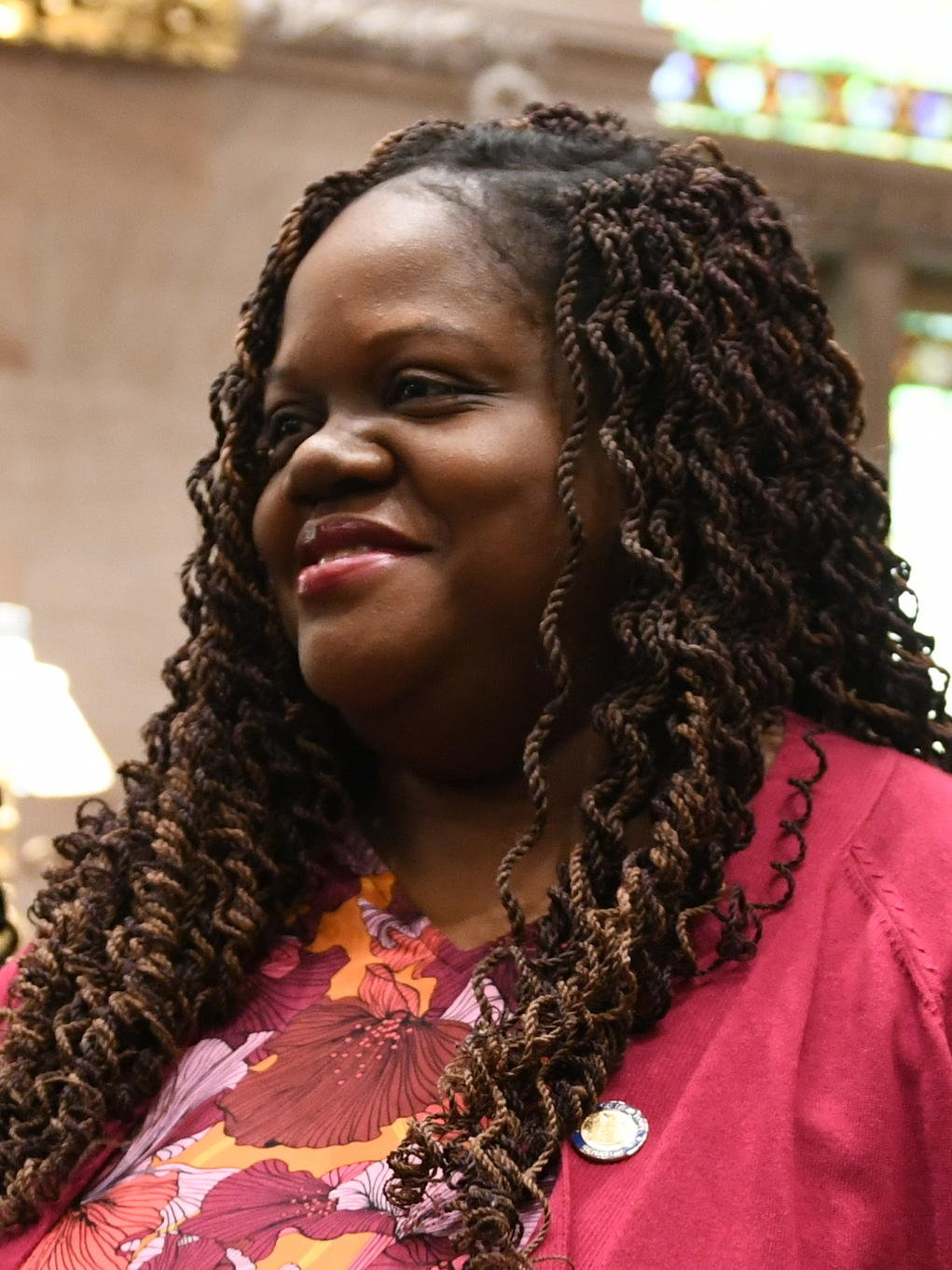

Nominee	Lea Webb	Michael Bolles
Party	Democratic	Republican
Alliance	Working Families	Conservative
Incumbent Senator
Lea Webb
Democratic

The 52nd district covers all of Cortland and Tompkins counties, as well as the western half of Broome County, including the cities of Binghamton and Ithaca. The incumbent is Democrat Lea Webb, who was re-elected to a second term with 57.48% of the vote in 2024.

=== Democratic primary ===
==== Nominee ====
- Lea Webb, incumbent senator

==== Endorsements ====
Lea Webb

Political parties

- New York Working Families Party

=== Republican primary ===
==== Nominee ====
- Michael Bolles

== District 53 ==
2026 New York's 53rd State Senate district election
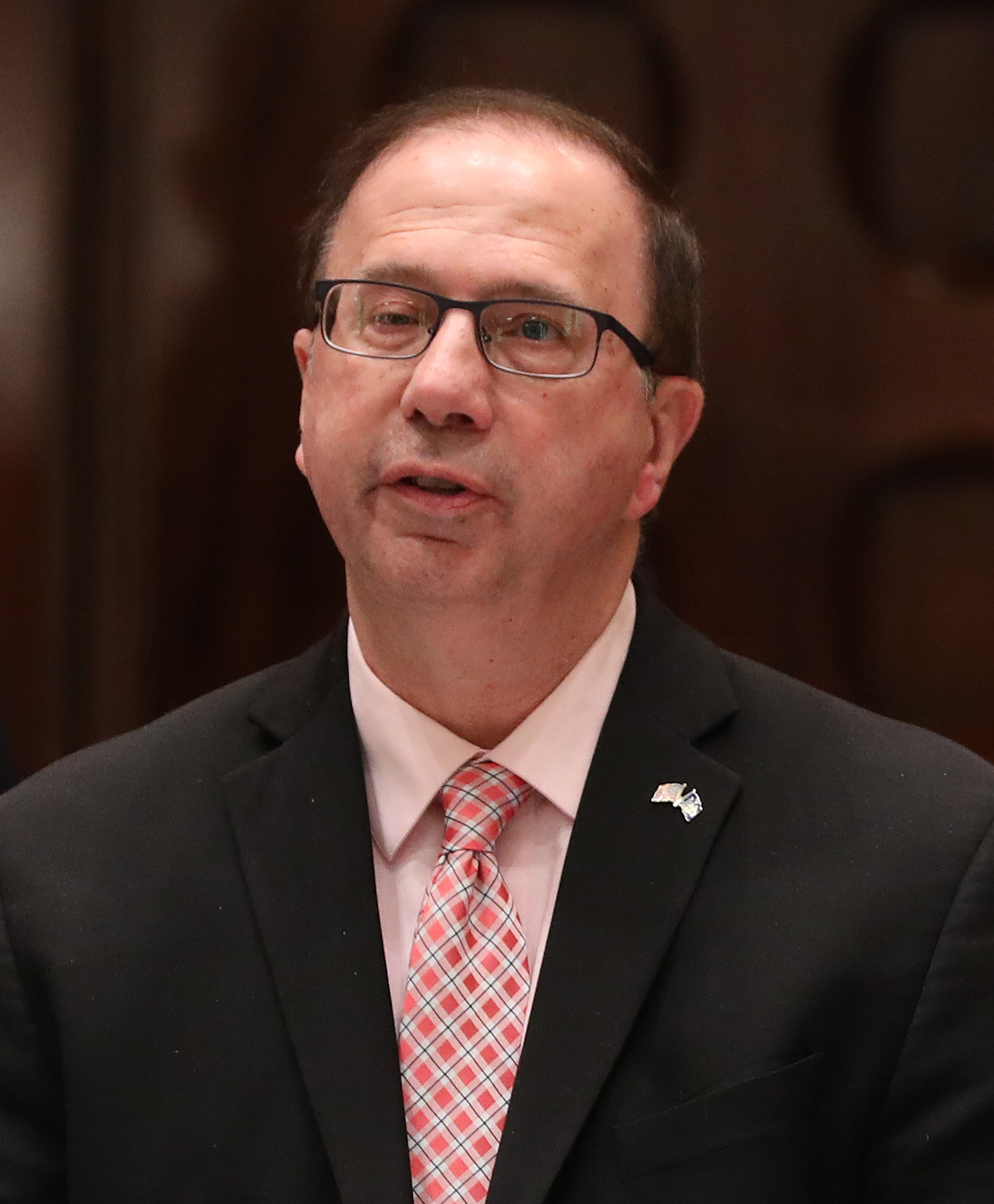

Nominee	Joseph Griffo	Mandi Drake
Party	Republican	Democratic
Alliance	Conservative	Working Families
Incumbent Senator
Joseph Griffo
Republican

The 53rd district covers all of Madison and Oneida counties, and portions of Chenango Herkimer, including the city of Utica. The incumbent is Republican Joseph Griffo, who was re-elected to a tenth term with 70.17% of the vote in 2024.

=== Republican primary ===
==== Nominee ====
- Joseph Griffo, incumbent senator

=== Democratic primary ===
==== Nominee ====
- Mandi Drake

==== Endorsements ====
Mandi Drake

Political parties

- New York Working Families Party

== District 54 ==
2026 New York's 54th State Senate district election
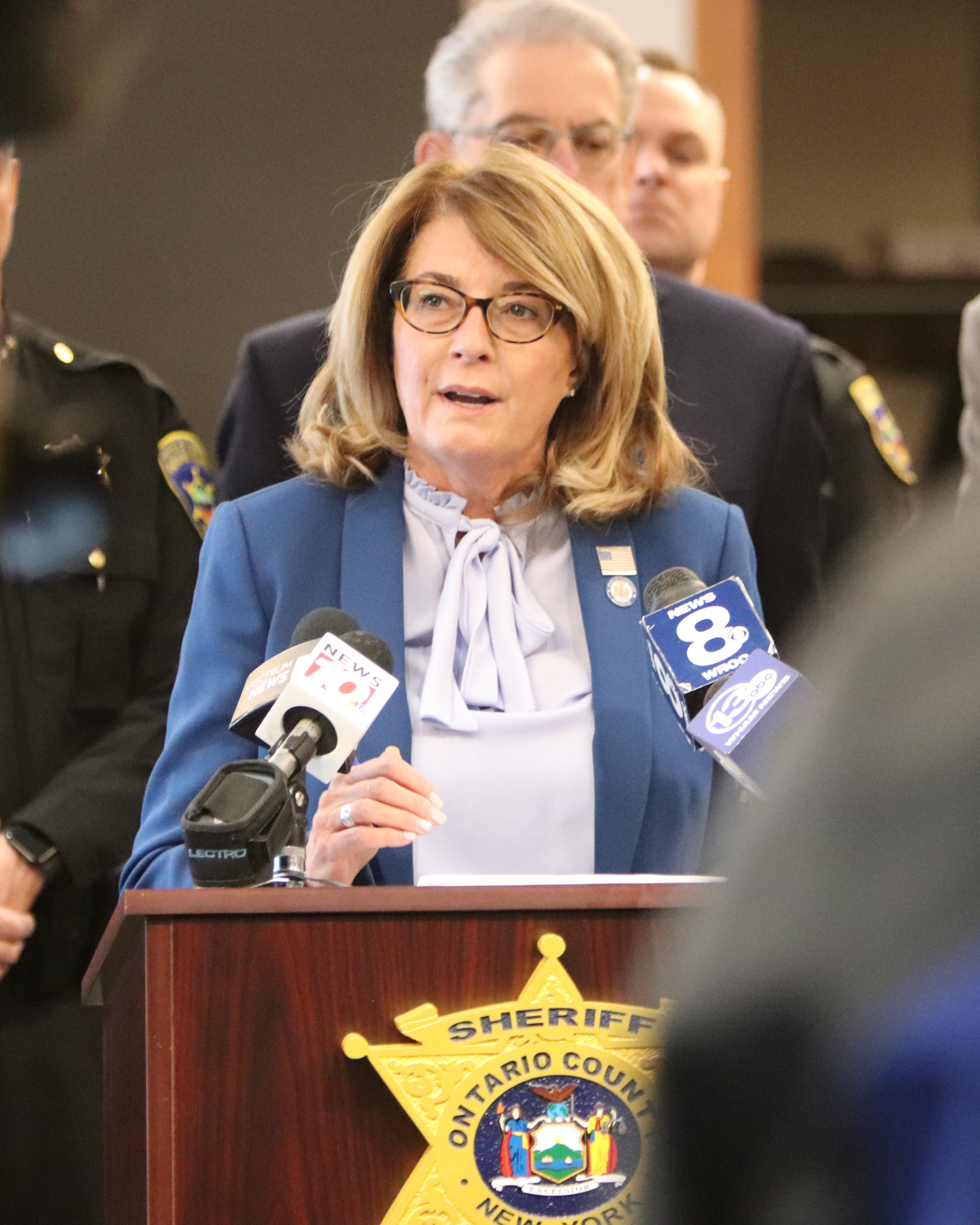

Nominee	Pam Helming	Michael Mills
Party	Republican	Democratic
Alliance	Conservative
Incumbent Senator
Pam Helming
Republican

The 54th district covers all of Wayne County, and portions of Livingston, Monroe, and Ontario counties, including the municipalities of Canandaigua, Geneva, Portage, and Richmond. The incumbent is Republican Pam Helming, who was re-elected to a fifth term with 64.5% of the vote in 2024.

=== Republican primary ===
==== Nominee ====
- Pamela Helming, incumbent senator

=== Democratic primary ===
==== Nominee ====
- Michael Mills, Canandaigua, New York city councilman (2024–present)

==== Eliminated in primary ====
- Scott Comegys, community leader

==== Endorsements ====
Scott Comegys

Political parties

- New York Working Families Party

==== Results ====
2026 New York State Senate Democratic primary, District 54
Party	Candidate	Votes	%
Democratic	Michael Mills	5,245	51.5
Democratic	Scott Comegys	4,925	48.4
Write-in		14	0.1
Total votes		10,184	100.0

== District 55 ==
2026 New York's 55th State Senate district election
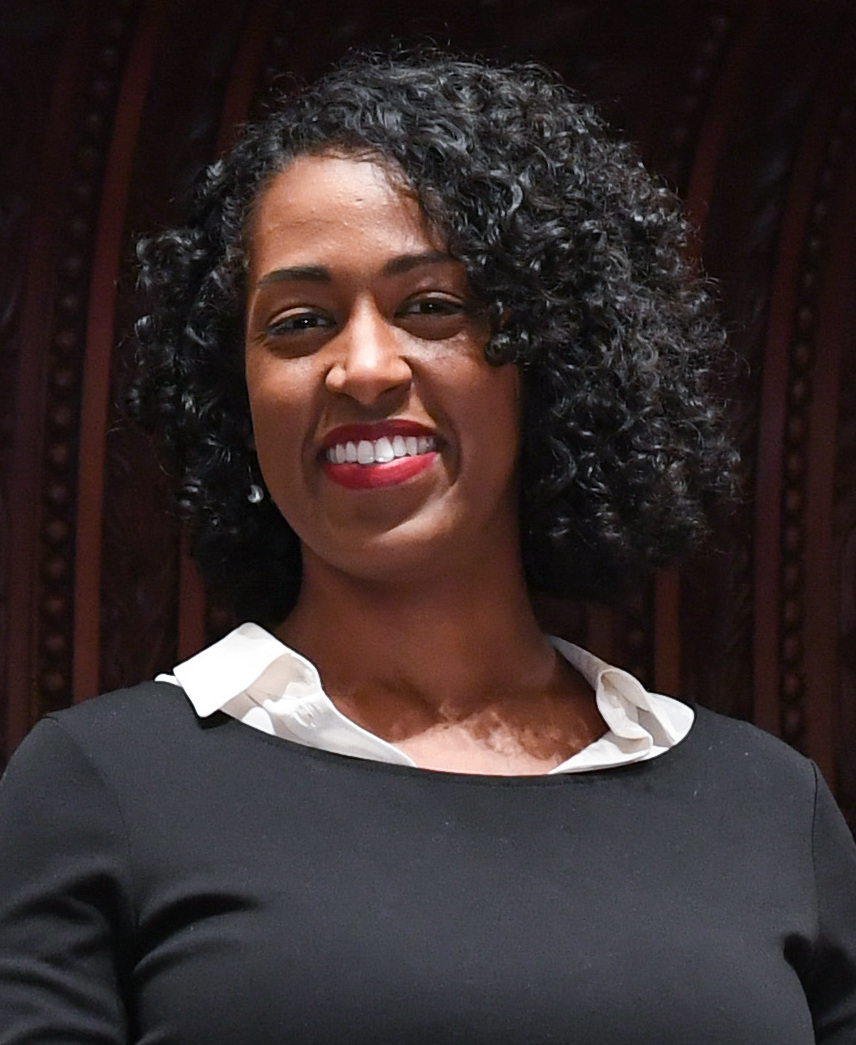

Nominee	Samra Brouk	Chris Brown
Party	Democratic	Republican
Alliance	Working Families	Conservative
Incumbent Senator
Samra Brouk
Democratic

The 55th district covers a portion of Monroe County, including the eastern half of the city of Rochester. The incumbent is Democrat Samra Brouk, who was re-elected to a third term with 61.56% of the vote in 2024.

=== Democratic primary ===
==== Nominee ====
- Samra Brouk, incumbent senator

==== Endorsements ====
Samra Brouk

Political parties

- New York Working Families Party

=== Republican primary ===
==== Nominee ====
- Chris Brown, software engineer

== District 56 ==
2026 New York's 56th State Senate district election

Nominee	Jeremy Cooney	Orlando Rivera
Party	Democratic	Republican
Alliance	Working Families	Conservative
Incumbent Senator
Jeremy Cooney
Democratic

The 56th district covers a portion of Monroe County, including the western half of the city of Rochester. The incumbent is Democrat Jeremy Cooney, who was re-elected to a third term with 58.86% of the vote in 2024.

=== Democratic primary ===
==== Nominee ====
- Jeremy Cooney, incumbent senator

==== Endorsements ====
Jeremy Cooney

Political parties

- New York Working Families Party

=== Republican primary ===
==== Nominee ====
- Orlando Rivera, candidate for New York State Assembly in 2024

== District 57 ==
2026 New York's 57th State Senate district election
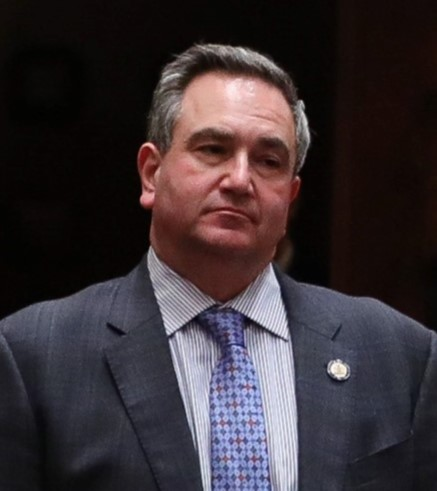

Nominee	George Borrello	Victoria Guite-Williams
Party	Republican	Democratic
Alliance	Conservative	Working Families
Incumbent Senator
George Borrello
Republican

The 57th district covers all of Cattaraugus, Chautauqua, Genesee, and Wyoming counties, and the western half of Allegany County, including the cities of Batavia and Jamestown. The incumbent is Republican George Borrello, who was re-elected to a third full term with 99.59% of the vote in 2024.

=== Republican primary ===
==== Nominee ====
- George Borrello, incumbent senator

=== Democratic primary ===
==== Nominee ====
- Victoria Guite-Williams

==== Endorsements ====
Victoria Guite-Williams

Political parties

- New York Working Families Party

== District 58 ==
2026 New York's 58th State Senate district election
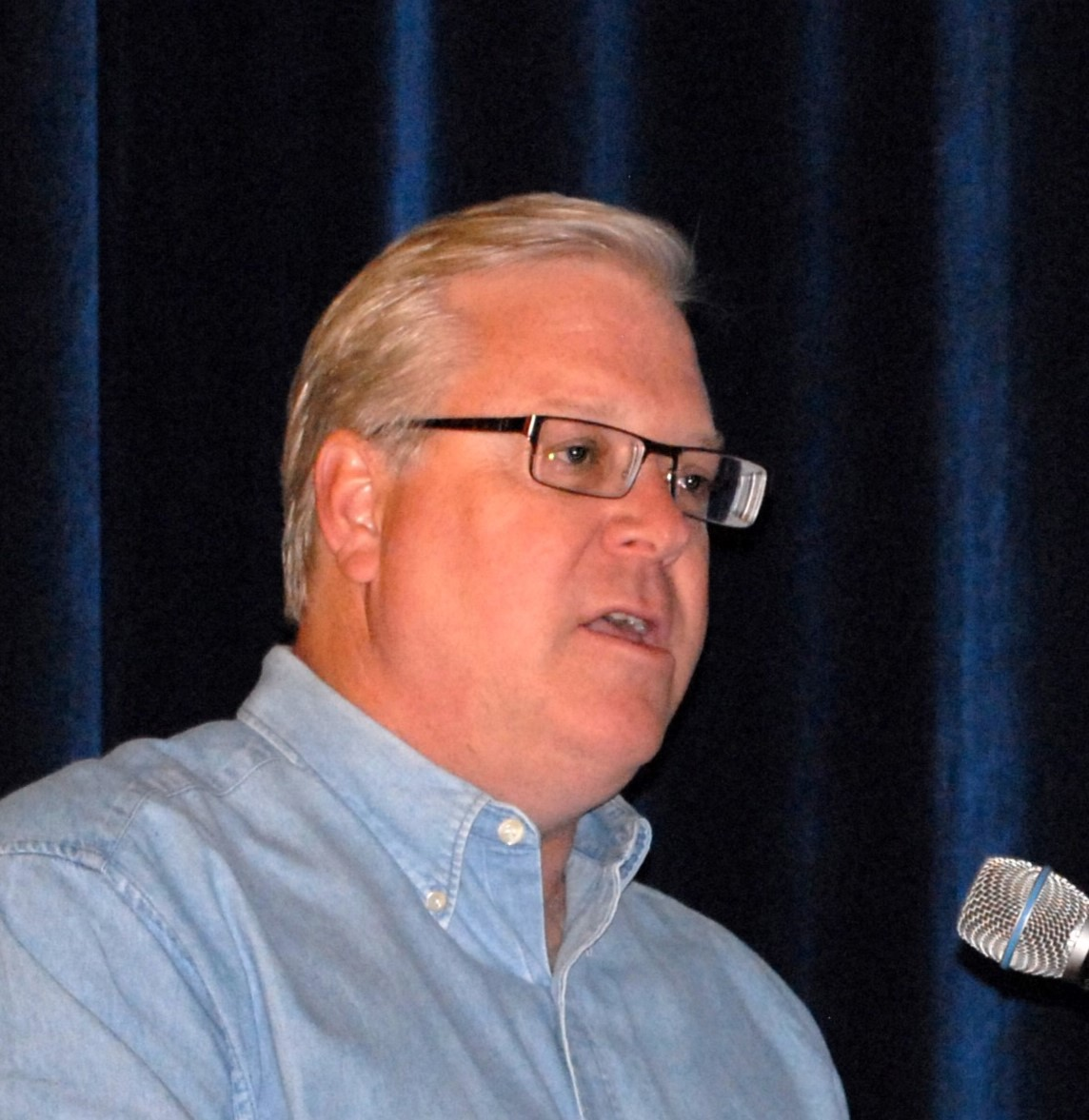

Nominee	Tom O'Mara	James Bobreski
Party	Republican	Democratic
Alliance	Conservative
Incumbent Senator
Tom O'Mara
Republican

The 58th district covers all of Chemung, Schuyler, Seneca, Steuben, Tioga, and Yates counties, and the eastern half of Allegany County, including the city of Elmira. The incumbent is Republican Tom O'Mara, who was re-elected to an eighth term with 99.23% of the vote in 2024.

=== Republican primary ===
==== Nominee ====
- Tom O'Mara, incumbent senator

=== Democratic primary ===
==== Nominee ====
- James Bobreski, engineer

== District 59 ==
2026 New York's 59th State Senate district election
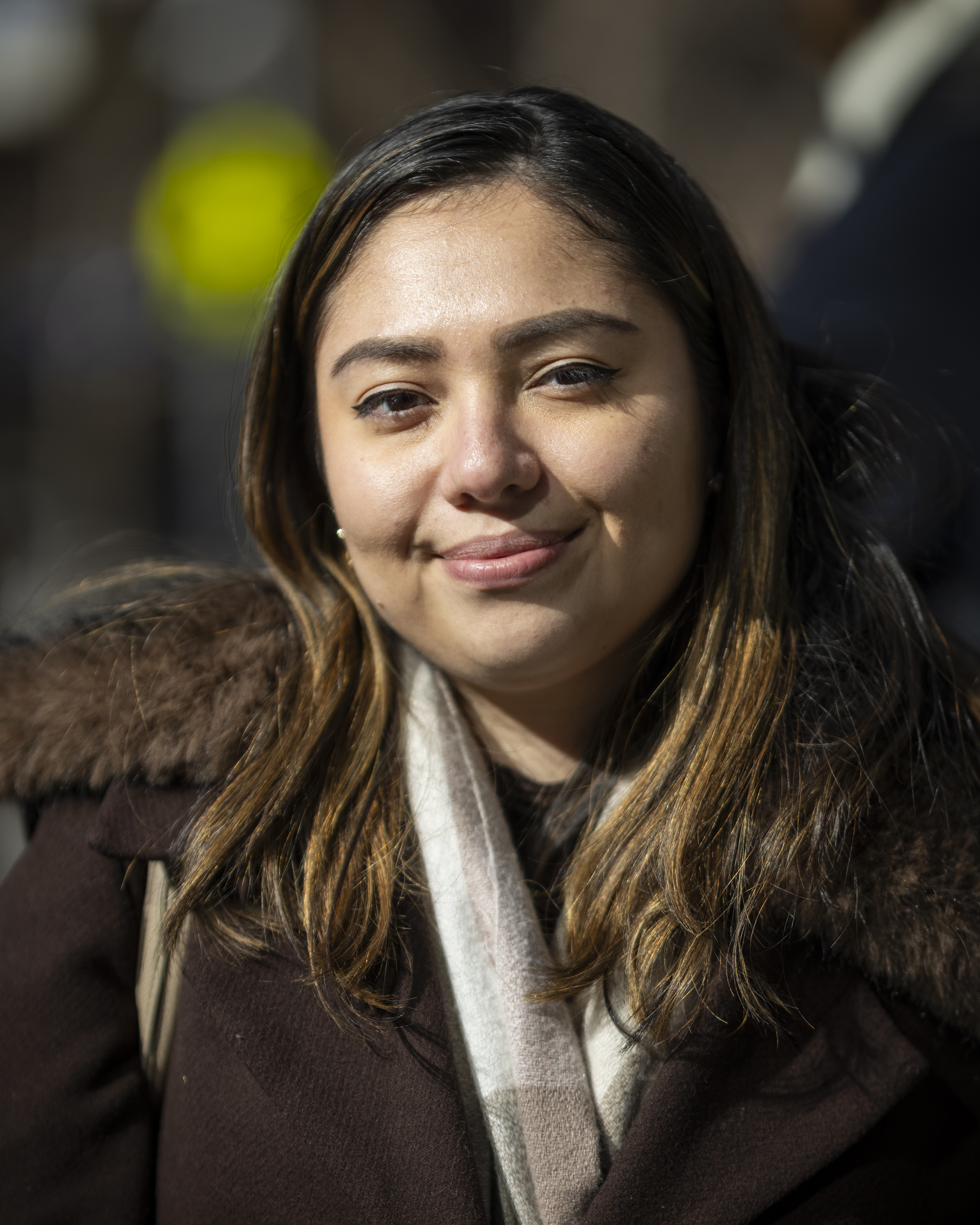
Nominee	Kristen Gonzalez
Party	Democratic
Alliance	Working Families
Incumbent Senator
Kristen Gonzalez
Democratic

The 59th district covers portions of Brooklyn, Manhattan, and Queens in New York City. The incumbent is Democrat Kristen Gonzalez, who was re-elected to a second term with 98.87% of the vote in 2024.

=== Democratic primary ===
==== Nominee ====
- Kristen Gonzalez, incumbent senator

==== Endorsements ====
Kristen Gonzalez

Labor unions

- 1199SEIU United Healthcare Workers East
- Committee of Interns and Residents
- Communication Workers of America
- International Union of Bricklayers and Allied Craftworkers Local #1
- N.Y.C. District Council of Carpenters
- New York State AFL-CIO
- New York State Nurses Association
- New York State United Teachers
- Retail, Wholesale and Department Store Union
- Transport Workers Union of America

Organizations

- Make the Road New York Action
- New York City Democratic Socialists of America
- New York Communities for Change
- Planned Parenthood PAC
- Sunrise Movement NYC

Political parties

- New York Working Families Party

== District 60 ==
2026 New York's 60th State Senate district election
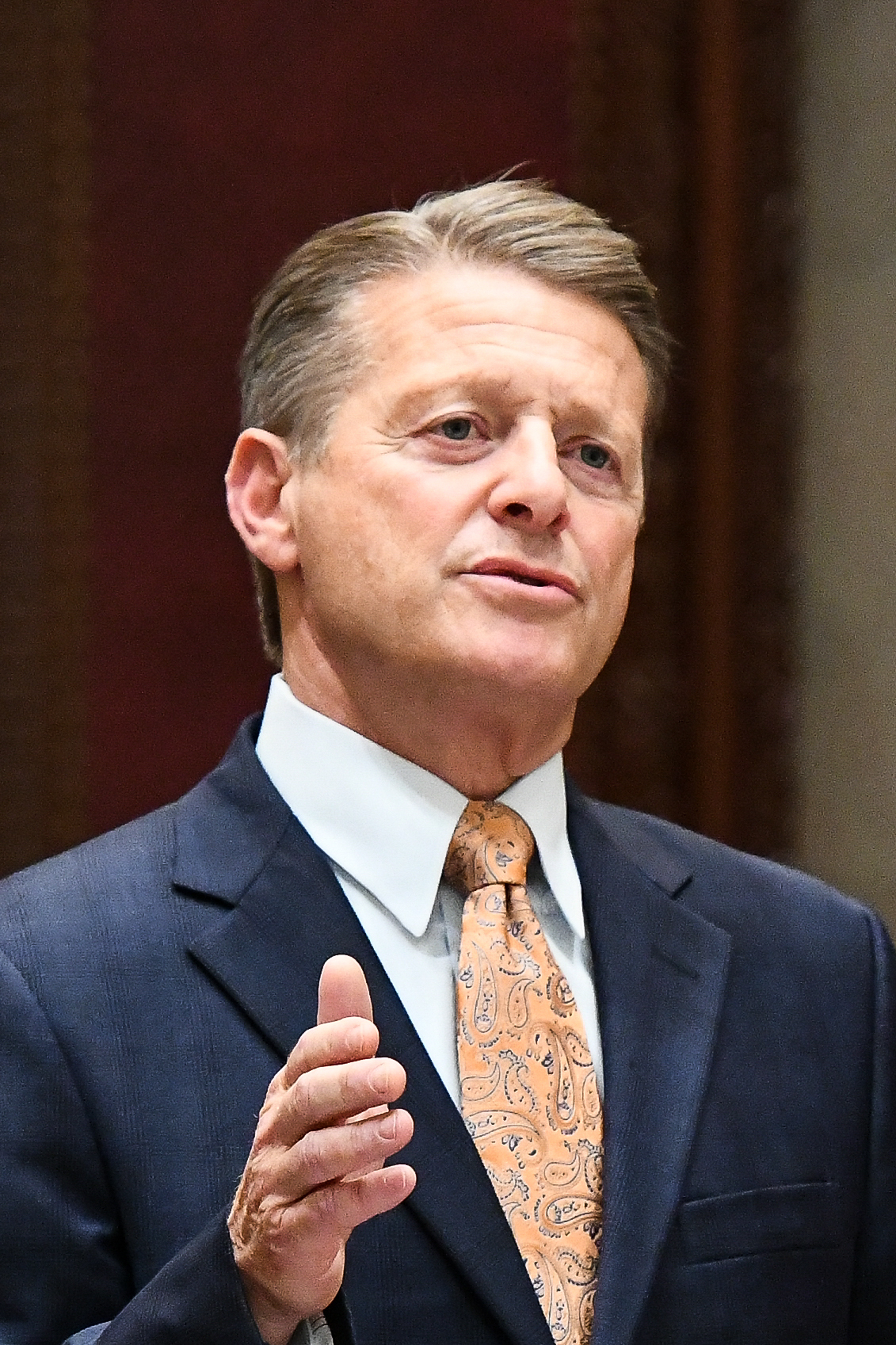
Nominee	Patrick M. Gallivan
Party	Republican
Alliance	Conservative
Incumbent Senator
Patrick M. Gallivan
Republican

The 60th district covers a portion of Erie County, including the towns of Clarence, Colden, and Elma. The incumbent is Republican Patrick M. Gallivan, who was re-elected to an eighth term with 98.97% of the vote in 2024.

=== Republican primary ===
==== Nominee ====
- Patrick M. Gallivan, incumbent senator

=== Democratic primary ===
==== Withdrawn or disqualified ====
- Jacqueline L. Balikowski

== District 61 ==
2026 New York's 61st State Senate district election
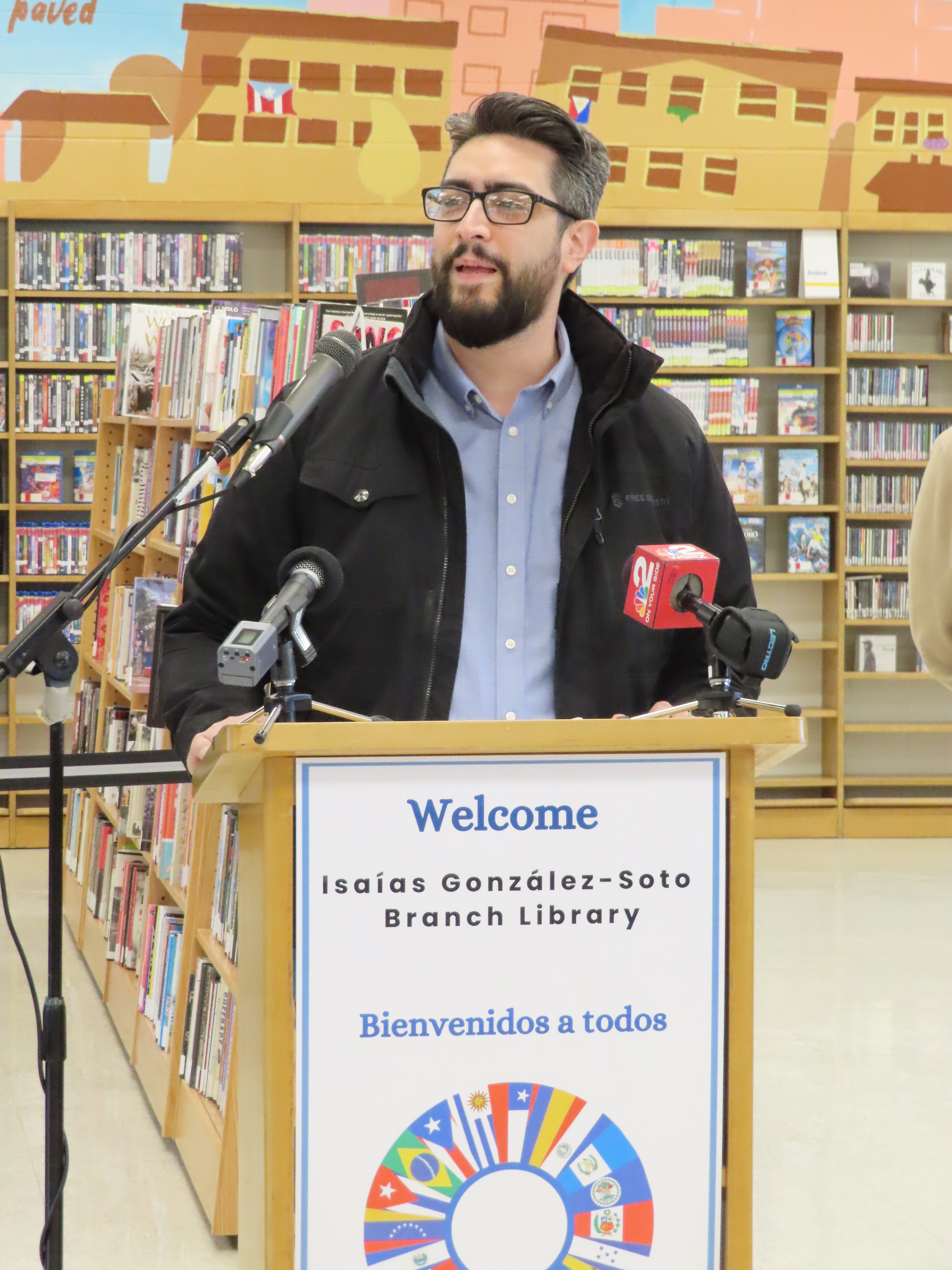
Nominee	Jonathan Rivera
Party	Democratic
Alliance	Working Families
Incumbent Senator
Jeremy Zellner
Democratic

The 61st district is located in Erie County, covering the municipalities of Amherst, Grand Island, the city of Tonawanda, the town of Tonawanda, and portions of Buffalo's Delaware, Ellicott, Masten, Niagara, North, and University wards. The incumbent is Democrat Jeremy Zellner, who was elected in a special election with 59.69% of the vote in February 2026.

In 2024, incumbent Democratic senator Sean Ryan won re-election to a third term with 61.73% of the vote. On December 31, 2025, he resigned from the state senate to become the mayor of Buffalo after winning the general election on November 4. On February 3, 2026, Democrat Jeremy Zellner won the special election with 59.69% of the vote against Republican Dan R. Gagliardo to succeed Ryan. Zellner was sworn in on February 4.

=== Democratic primary ===
==== Nominee ====
- Jonathan Rivera, state assemblymember from the 149th district (2021–present)

==== Eliminated in primary ====
- Jeremy Zellner, incumbent senator

==== Endorsements ====
Jonathan Rivera

Organizations

- Latino Victory Fund
- Our Revolution

Political parties

- New York Working Families Party
Jeremy Zellner

Statewide officials

- Kathy Hochul, governor of New York (2021-present)

==== Results ====
2026 New York State Senate Democratic primary, District 61
Party	Candidate	Votes	%
Democratic	Jonathan Rivera	10,222	54.8
Democratic	Jeremy Zellner (incumbent)	8,412	45.1
Write-in		29	0.2
Total votes		18,663	100.0

=== Republican primary ===
==== Withdrawn or disqualified ====
- Dan R. Gagliardo, businessman and nominee for this district in the 2026 special election
- Christopher McMaster, attorney

=== Conservative primary ===
==== Withdrawn or disqualified ====
- Christopher McMaster, attorney

== District 62 ==
2026 New York's 62nd State Senate district election
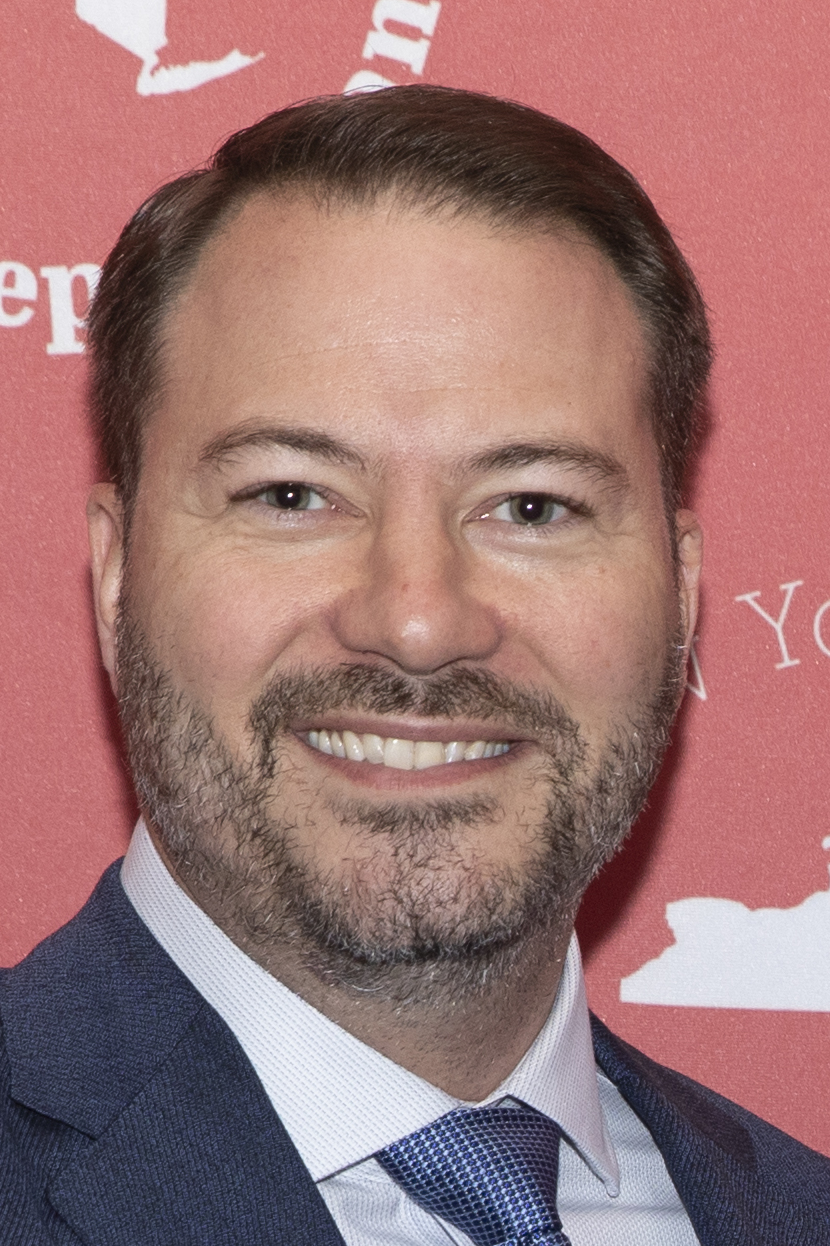

Nominee	Rob Ortt	Thomas Arida
Party	Republican	Democratic
Alliance	Conservative	Working Families
Incumbent Senator
Rob Ortt
Republican

The 62nd district covers all of Niagara and Orleans counties, as well as the western half of Monroe County, including the city of Niagara Falls. The incumbent is Republican Rob Ortt, who was re-elected to a sixth term with 99.37% of the vote in 2024.

=== Republican primary ===
==== Nominee ====
- Rob Ortt, incumbent senator

=== Democratic primary ===
==== Nominee ====
- Thomas Arida, consultant

==== Endorsements ====
Thomas Arida

Political parties

- New York Working Families Party

== District 63 ==
2026 New York's 63rd State Senate district election
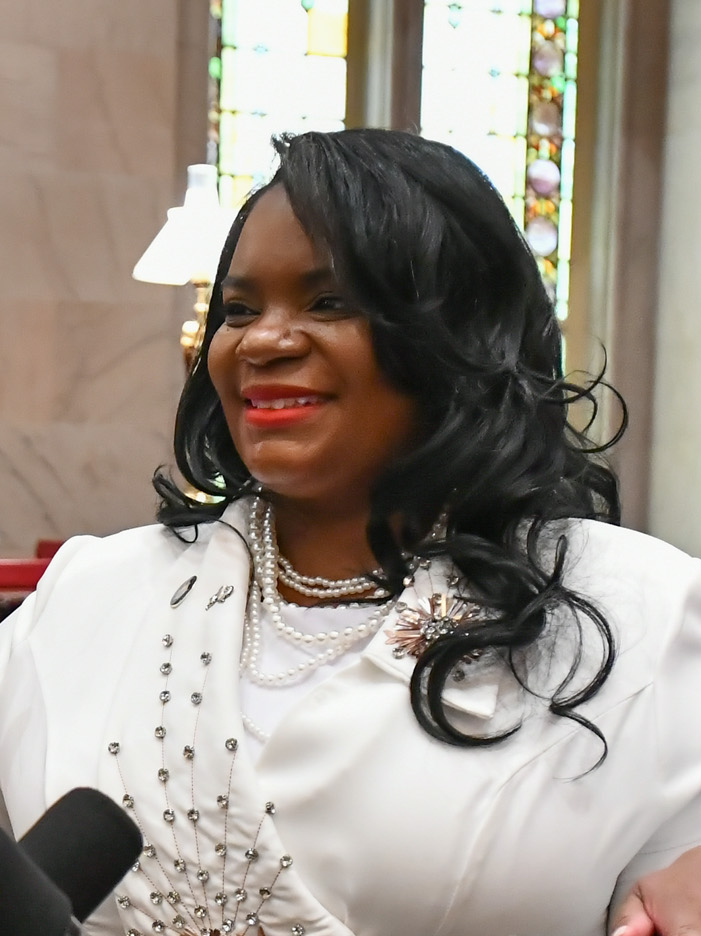

Nominee	April Baskin	Geoffrey Szymanski
Party	Democratic	Republican
Alliance	Working Families	Conservative
Incumbent Senator
April Baskin
Democratic

The 63rd district covers a portion of Erie County, including most of the city of Buffalo and all of Cheektowaga and Lackawanna. The incumbent is Democrat April Baskin, who defeated Republican John P. Moretti Jr. to fill the vacancy of eight-term Democratic incumbent Tim Kennedy, who resigned on May 6, 2024, with 66.3% of the vote in 2024.

=== Democratic primary ===
==== Nominee ====
- April Baskin, incumbent senator

==== Endorsements ====
April Baskin

Political parties

- New York Working Families Party

=== Republican primary ===
==== Nominee ====
- Geoffrey Szymanski, former mayor of Lackawanna

== See also ==
- List of New York State legislatures
