= 2022 New York State Senate election =

- November 8, 2022

All 63 seats in the New York State Senate 32 seats needed for a majority
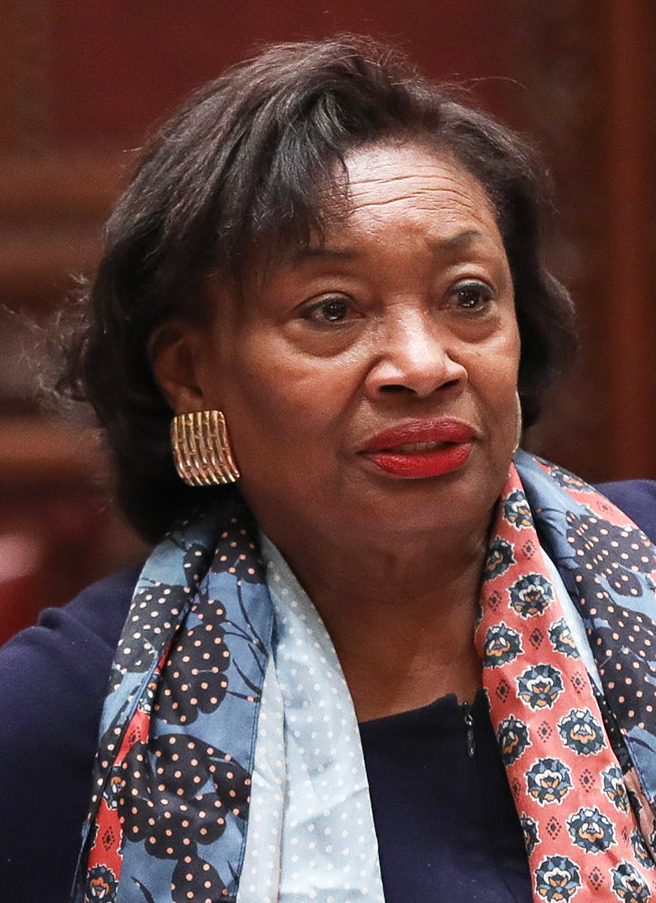

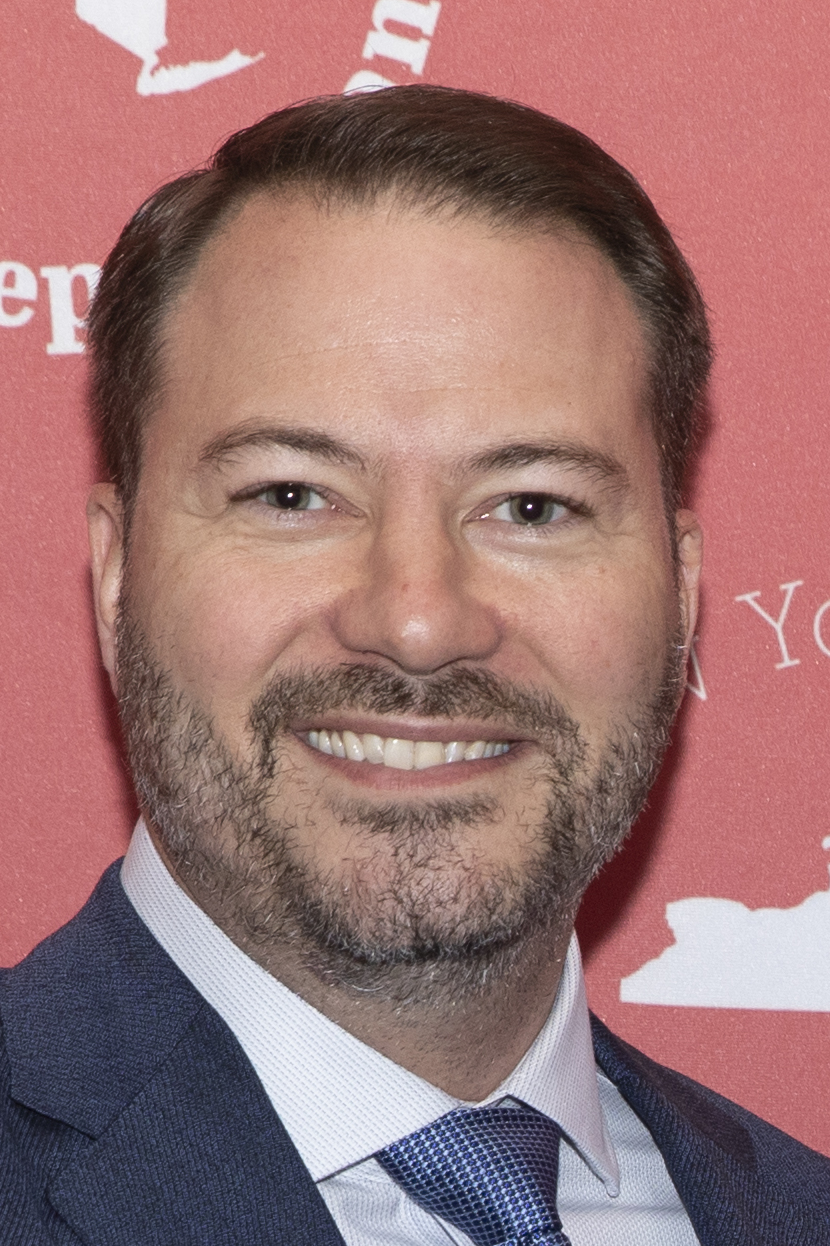
	Majority party	Minority party
Leader	Andrea Stewart-Cousins	Rob Ortt
Party	Democratic	Republican
Leader's seat	35th District	62nd District
Seats before	43	20
Seats after	42	21
Seat change	▼1	▲1
Popular vote	2,658,907	2,233,086
Percentage	48.66%	40.86%
Swing	▼7.30%	▲6.84%
- Democratic gain Republican gain Democratic hold Republican hold 40–50% 50–60% 60–70% 70–80% 80–90% >90% 50–60% 60–70% 70–80% >90% Note: Two districts in New York City are marked as democratic gains because they are newly created districts, not because they switched parties. Two upstate districts, both held by Republicans, were eliminated due to population shifts.
Temporary President and Majority Leader before election
Andrea Stewart-Cousins
Democratic
Elected Temporary President and Majority Leader
Andrea Stewart-Cousins
Democratic

The 2022 New York State Senate election was held on November 8, 2022. Elections were held to elect representatives from all 63 districts across the State of New York. This election coincided with New York elections for the governorship, U.S. Senate, and state assembly, among others. Districts for this election were redrawn following the 2020 United States census. Democrats had held a majority in the New York State Senate since January 2019, as a result of the 2018 elections.

== Background ==
By 2018, the State Senate was the last Republican-controlled body in the New York government. In the 2018 elections, Senate Democrats won control of the chamber from the Republicans. Previously, Republicans had controlled the Senate for all but three years since World War II, with the current era being the Democrats' largest share of New York State Senate seats since 1912.

Prior to the 2020 elections, Democrats held 40 seats in the State Senate, while Republicans held 20 seats and three other seats were vacant. In the 2020 elections, Democrats won 43 State Senate seats.

== Predictions ==
Source	Ranking	As of
Sabato's Crystal Ball	Safe D	May 19, 2022

== Polling ==
Senate District 1
General election

Poll source	Date(s) administered	Sample size (Note: Key: A – all adults RV – registered voters LV – likely voters V – unclear)	Margin of error	Anthony Palumbo (R)	Skyler Johnson (D)	Undecided
Public Policy Polling (D) (Note: Poll sponsored by Johnson's campaign)	August 15–16, 2022	644 (LV)	± 3.8%	46%	41%	13%

== Results ==
=== Election ===
2022 New York State Senate election General election — November 8, 2022
New York State Senate 2022
Party	Votes	Percentage	Seats	+/–
Democratic	2,658,907	48.66	42	▼1
Republican	2,223,086	40.86	22	▲1
Conservative	314,379	5.75	0	Steady
Working Families	225,800	4.13	0	Steady
Medical Freedom	11,163	0.20	0	Steady
Parent	4,937	0.09	0	Steady
Independence	2,428	0.04	0	Steady
We The People	748	0.01	0	Steady
Scattering	13,318	0.24	0	Steady
Valid votes	5,464,766	91.66	63	—
Blank votes	489,550	8.21	—	—
Void votes	7,458	0.13	—	—
Totals	5,961.774	100	63	—

=== Close races ===
Districts where the margin of victory was under 10%:

1. State Senate district 50, 0.01%
2. State Senate district 17, 0.6% (new)
3. State Senate district 42, 1.4%
4. State Senate district 52, 2.2% (gain)
5. State Senate district 4, 2.4% (new)
6. State Senate district 23, 2.8%
7. State Senate district 38, 3.6% (gain)
8. State Senate district 41, 5%
9. State Senate district 43, 5.8%
10. State Senate district 7, 6.4% (gain)
11. State Senate district 39, 6.4% (new)
12. State Senate district 40, 6.8%
13. State Senate district 48, 7.3%
14. State Senate district 56, 8%

=== Summary by Senate District ===
District	PVI	Incumbent	Party	First elected	Status	Results
1	R+1	Anthony Palumbo	Republican	2020	Incumbent re-elected.	▌ ✓ Anthony Palumbo (R) 56.4% ▌Skyler Johnson (D) 43.6%
2	R+4	Mario Mattera	Republican	2020	Incumbent re-elected.	▌ ✓ Mario Mattera (R) 58.1% ▌Susan Berland (D) 41.9%
2	R+4	Jim Gaughran^{Redistricted from the 5th district.}	Democratic	2018	Incumbent retired. Democratic loss.	▌ ✓ Mario Mattera (R) 58.1% ▌Susan Berland (D) 41.9%
3	R+8	Phil Boyle^{Redistricted from the 4th district.}	Republican	2012	Incumbent retired. New member elected. Republican hold.	▌ ✓ Dean Murray (R) 65.4% ▌Farzeen Bham (D) 34.6%
4	D+10	New seat^{Redistricting.}			New seat. New member elected. Democratic gain.	▌ ✓ Monica Martinez (D) 51.2% ▌Wendy Rodriguez (R) 48.8%
5	R+5	John Brooks^{Redistricted from the 8th district.}	Democratic	2016	Incumbent lost re-election. New member elected. Republican gain.	▌ ✓ Steven Rhoads (R) 60.8% ▌John Brooks (D) 39.2%
6	D+17	Kevin Thomas	Democratic	2018	Incumbent re-elected.	▌ ✓ Kevin Thomas (D) 59.1% ▌James Coll (R) 40.9%
7	D+4	Anna Kaplan	Democratic	2018	Incumbent lost re-election. New member elected. Republican gain.	▌ ✓ Jack Martins (R) 53.2% ▌Anna Kaplan (D) 46.8%
8	R+12	Alexis Weik^{Redistricted from the 3rd district.}	Republican	2020	Incumbent re-elected.	▌ ✓ Alexis Weik (R) 69.4% ▌John Alberts (D) 30.6%
9	D+3	Todd Kaminsky	Democratic	2016 (Note: First elected in a special election.)	Incumbent retired. New member elected. Republican gain.	▌ ✓ Patricia Canzoneri-Fitzpatrick (R) 56.2% ▌Kenneth Moore (D) 43.8%
10	D+29	James Sanders Jr.	Democratic	2012	Incumbent re-elected.	▌ ✓ James Sanders Jr. (D) (Note: Unopposed in the general election.)
11	D+17	Toby Ann Stavisky^{Redistricted from the 16th district.}	Democratic	1999	Incumbent re-elected.	▌ ✓ Toby Ann Stavisky (D) 56.0% ▌Stefano Forte (R) 44.0%
12	D+23	Michael Gianaris	Democratic	2010	Incumbent re-elected.	▌ ✓ Michael Gianaris (D)
13	D+29	Jessica Ramos	Democratic	2018	Incumbent re-elected.	▌ ✓ Jessica Ramos (D)
14	D+35	Leroy Comrie	Democratic	2014	Incumbent re-elected.	▌ ✓ Leroy Comrie (D)
15	D+15	Joseph Addabbo Jr.	Democratic	2008	Incumbent re-elected.	▌ ✓ Joseph Addabbo Jr. (D) 56.9% ▌Danniel Maio (R) 43.1%
16	D+13	John Liu^{Redistricted from the 11th district.}	Democratic	2018	Incumbent re-elected.	▌ ✓ John Liu (D) 57.7% ▌Ruben Cruz II (R) 42.3%
17	D+8	New seat^{Redistricting.}			New seat. New member elected. Democratic gain.	▌ ✓ Iwen Chu (D) 50.3% ▌Vito La Bella (R) 49.7%
18	D+35	Julia Salazar	Democratic	2018	Incumbent re-elected.	▌ ✓ Julia Salazar (D)
19	D+41	Roxanne Persaud	Democratic	2015	Incumbent re-elected.	▌ ✓ Roxanne Persaud (D)
20	D+42	Zellnor Myrie	Democratic	2018	Incumbent re-elected.	▌ ✓ Zellnor Myrie (D)
21	D+32	Kevin Parker	Democratic	2002	Incumbent re-elected.	▌ ✓ Kevin Parker (D) 80.5% ▌ David Alexis (WF) 19.5%
22	R+19	Simcha Felder^{Redistricted from the 17th district.}	Democratic	2012	Incumbent re-elected.	▌ ✓ Simcha Felder (D) 95.5% ▌ Marva Brown (WF) 4.5%
23	D+7	Diane Savino	Democratic	2004	Incumbent retired. New member elected. Democratic hold.	▌ ✓ Jessica Scarcella-Spanton (D) 51.4% ▌Joseph L. Tirone Jr (R) 48.6%
24	R+19	Andrew Lanza	Republican	2006	Incumbent re-elected.	▌ ✓ Andrew Lanza (R)
25	D+45	Jabari Brisport	Democratic	2020	Incumbent re-elected.	▌ ✓ Jabari Brisport (D)
26	D+31	Andrew Gounardes^{Redistricted from the 22nd district.}	Democratic	2018	Incumbent re-elected.	▌ ✓ Andrew Gounardes (D) 78.7% ▌ Brian Fox (R) 20.5% ▌ Martha Rowen (MF) 0.7%
27	D+37	Brian P. Kavanagh^{Redistricted from the 26th district.}	Democratic	2017	Incumbent re-elected.	▌ ✓ Brian P. Kavanagh (D) 95.9% ▌ Eric Rassi (I) 4.1%
28	D+31	Liz Krueger	Democratic	2002	Incumbent re-elected.	▌ ✓ Liz Krueger (D) 77.6% ▌ Awadhesh Kumar Gupta (R) 22.4%
29	D+39	José M. Serrano	Democratic	2004	Incumbent re-elected.	▌ ✓ José M. Serrano (D)
30	D+43	Cordell Cleare	Democratic	2021	Incumbent re-elected.	▌ ✓ Cordell Cleare (D)
31	D+37	Robert Jackson	Democratic	2018	Incumbent re-elected.	▌ ✓ Robert Jackson (D) 85.2% ▌ Donald Skinner (R) 14.8%
32	D+40	Luis R. Sepúlveda	Democratic	2018	Incumbent re-elected.	▌ ✓ Luis R. Sepúlveda (D) 83.2% ▌ Antonio Melendez Sr. (R) 14.6% ▌ Dion Powell (C) 2.1%
33	D+33	Gustavo Rivera	Democratic	2010	Incumbent re-elected.	▌ ✓ Gustavo Rivera (D)
34	D+26	Alessandra Biaggi	Democratic	2018	Incumbent retired to run for U.S. Congress. New member elected. Democratic hold.	▌ ✓ Nathalia Fernandez (D) 65.3% ▌ Hasmine S. Zerka (R) 34.7%
35	D+17	Andrea Stewart-Cousins	Democratic	2006	Incumbent re-elected.	▌ ✓ Andrea Stewart-Cousins (D) 64.8% ▌ Khristen Kurr (R) 35.2%
36	D+39	Jamaal Bailey	Democratic	2016	Incumbent re-elected.	▌ ✓ Jamaal Bailey (D)
37	D+15	Shelley Mayer	Democratic	2018	Incumbent re-elected.	▌ ✓ Shelley Mayer (D) 61.0% ▌ Frank Murtha (R) 39.0%
38	D+1	Elijah Reichlin-Melnick	Democratic	2020	Incumbent lost re-election. New member elected. Republican gain.	▌ ✓ William Weber (R) 51.8% ▌ Elijah Reichlin-Melnick (D) 48.2%
39	D+1	New seat^{Redistricting.}			New seat. New member elected. Republican gain.	▌ ✓ Robert Rolison (R) 53.2% ▌ Julie Shiroishi (D) 46.8%
40	D+5	Peter Harckham	Democratic	2018	Incumbent re-elected.	▌ ✓ Peter Harckham (D) 53.4% ▌ Gina M. Arena (R) 46.6%
41	D+3	Michelle Hinchey^{Redistricted from the 46th district.}	Democratic	2020	Incumbent re-elected.	▌ ✓ Michelle Hinchey (D) 52.5% ▌ Sue Serino (R) 47.5%
41	D+3	Sue Serino	Republican	2014	Incumbent lost re-election to a fellow incumbent. Republican loss.	▌ ✓ Michelle Hinchey (D) 52.5% ▌ Sue Serino (R) 47.5%
42	R+4	James Skoufis^{Redistricted from the 39th district.}	Democratic	2018	Incumbent re-elected.	▌ ✓ James Skoufis (D) 50.7% ▌ Dorey Houle (R) 49.3%
42	R+4	Mike Martucci	Republican	2020	Incumbent retired. Republican loss.	▌ ✓ James Skoufis (D) 50.7% ▌ Dorey Houle (R) 49.3%
43	D+1	Daphne Jordan	Republican	2018	Incumbent retired. New member elected. Republican hold.	▌ ✓ Jake Ashby (R) 52.9% ▌ Andrea Smyth (D) 47.1%
44	D+3	Jim Tedisco^{Redistricted from the 49th district.}	Republican	2016	Incumbent re-elected.	▌ ✓ Jim Tedisco (R) 56.6% ▌ Michelle Ostrelich (D) 43.4%
45	R+3	Dan Stec	Republican	2020	Incumbent re-elected.	▌ ✓ Dan Stec (R) 60.4% ▌ Jean Lapper (D) 39.6%
46	D+7	Neil Breslin^{Redistricted from the 44th district.}	Democratic	1996	Incumbent re-elected.	▌ ✓ Neil Breslin (D) 55.2% ▌ Richard M. Amedure Jr. (R) 44.8%
47	D+38	Brad Hoylman^{Redistricted from the 27th district.}	Democratic	2012	Incumbent re-elected.	▌ ✓ Brad Hoylman (D) 93.3% ▌ Maria Danzilo (I) 5.1% ▌ Robert Bobrick (I) 1.6%
48	D+7	Rachel May^{Redistricted from the 53rd district.}	Democratic	2018	Incumbent re-elected.	▌ ✓ Rachel May (D) 50.1% ▌ Julie Abbott (R) 42.8% ▌ Justin Coretti (C) 7.2%
49	R+16	Patty Ritchie^{Redistricted from the 48th district.}	Republican	2010	Incumbent retired. New member elected. Republican hold.	▌ ✓ Mark Walczyk (R)
50	EVEN	John Mannion	Democratic	2020	Incumbent re-elected.	▌ ✓ John Mannion (D) 50.004% ▌ Rebecca Shiroff (R) 49.996%
51	R+9	Peter Oberacker	Republican	2020	Incumbent re-elected.	▌ ✓ Peter Oberacker (R) 62.4% ▌ Eric Ball (D) 37.6%
52	D+8	Fred Akshar	Republican	2015	Incumbent retired to run for Broome County Sheriff. New member elected. Democratic gain.	▌ ✓ Lea Webb (D) 51.1% ▌ Richard David (R) 48.9%
53	R+11	Joseph Griffo^{Redistricted from the 47th district.}	Republican	2006	Incumbent re-elected.	▌ ✓ Joseph Griffo (R)
54	R+8	Pam Helming	Republican	2016	Incumbent re-elected.	▌ ✓ Pam Helming (R) 66.8% ▌ Kenan S. Baldridge (D) 33.2%
55	D+12	Samra Brouk	Democratic	2020	Incumbent re-elected.	▌ ✓ Samra Brouk (D) 58.2% ▌ Len Morrell (R) 41.8%
56	D+11	Jeremy Cooney	Democratic	2020	Incumbent re-elected.	▌ ✓ Jeremy Cooney (D) 54.0% ▌ James VanBrederode (R) 46.0%
57	R+18	George Borrello	Republican	2019	Incumbent re-elected.	▌ ✓ George Borrello (R) 73.3% ▌ Daniel Brown (D) 26.7%
58	R+13	Tom O'Mara	Republican	2010	Incumbent re-elected.	▌ ✓ Tom O'Mara (R)
59	D+35	New seat^{Redistricting.}			New seat. New member elected. Democratic gain.	▌ ✓ Kristen Gonzalez (D)
60	R+10	Patrick M. Gallivan^{Redistricted from the 59th district.}	Republican	2010	Incumbent re-elected.	▌ ✓ Patrick M. Gallivan (R)
61	D+8	Sean Ryan^{Redistricted from the 60th district.}	Democratic	2020	Incumbent re-elected.	▌ ✓ Sean Ryan (D) 56.7% ▌ Edward Rath III (R) 43.3%
61	D+8	Edward Rath III	Republican	2020	Incumbent lost re-election to a fellow incumbent. Republican loss.	▌ ✓ Sean Ryan (D) 56.7% ▌ Edward Rath III (R) 43.3%
62	R+11	Rob Ortt	Republican	2014	Incumbent re-elected.	▌ ✓ Rob Ortt (R)
63	D+19	Timothy M. Kennedy	Democratic	2010	Incumbent re-elected.	▌ ✓ Timothy M. Kennedy (D) 82.7% ▌ Faye Pietrak (C) 17.3%

== See also ==
- List of New York State legislatures

== Notes ==
Partisan clients
