= 2020 New York State Senate election =

- November 3, 2020

All 63 seats in the New York State Senate 32 seats needed for a majority
- Turnout: 57.72%
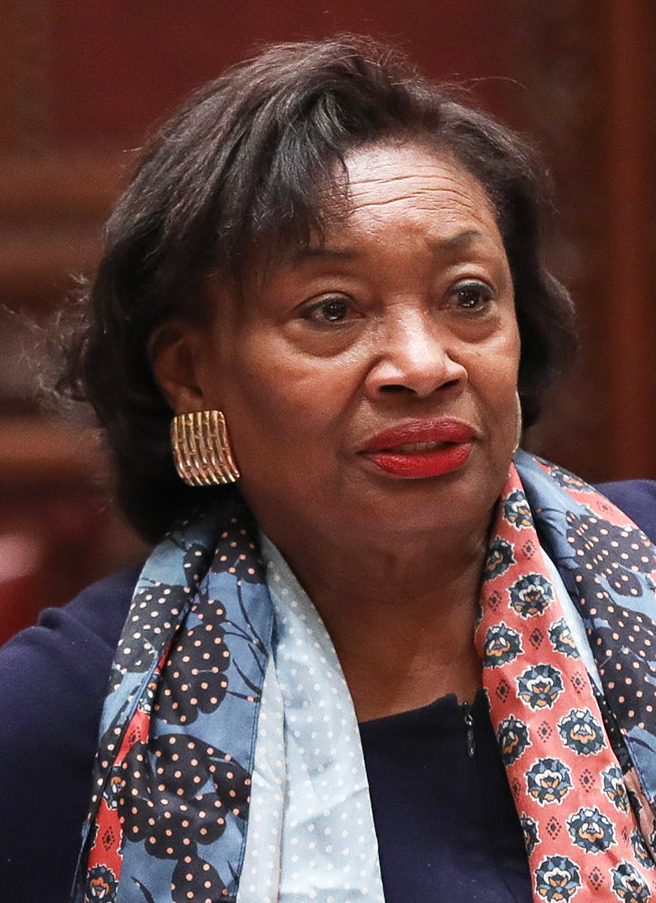

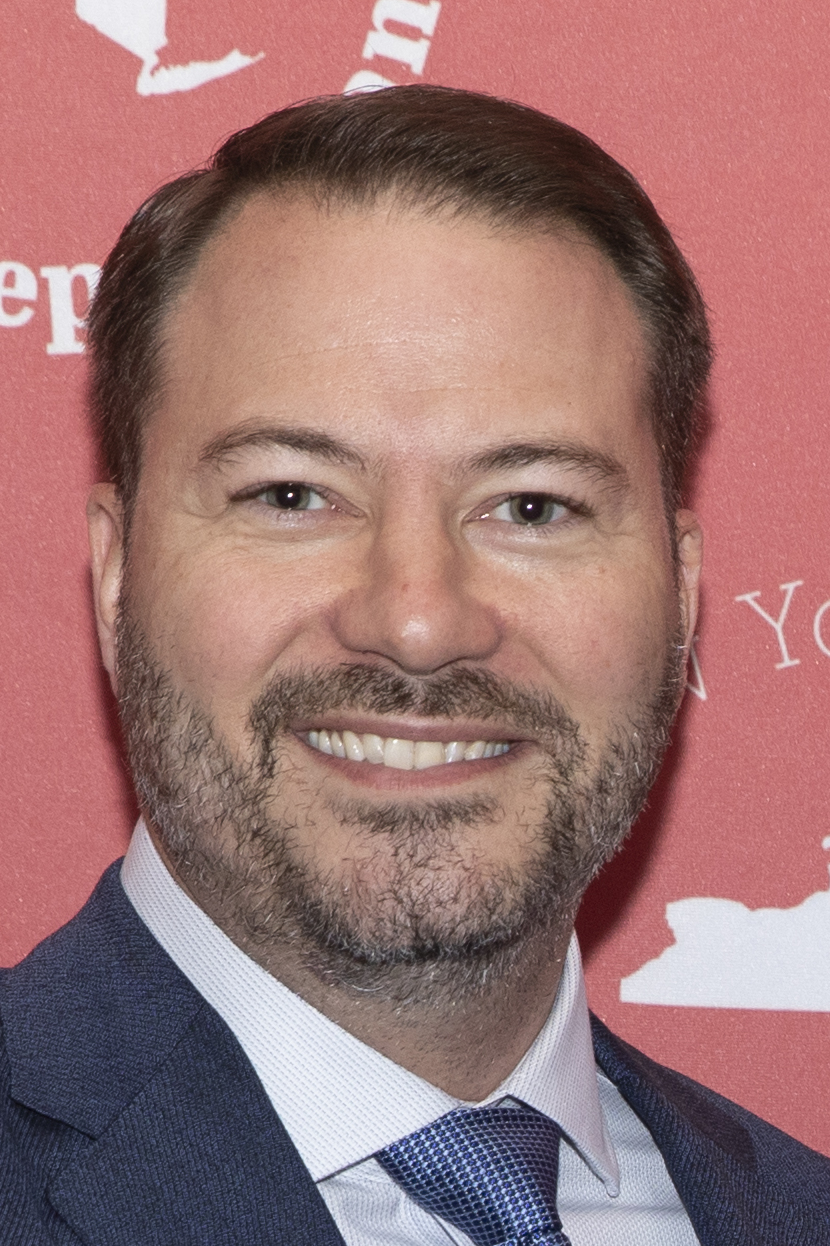
	Majority party	Minority party
Leader	Andrea Stewart-Cousins	Rob Ortt
Party	Democratic	Republican
Leader's seat	35th District	62nd District
Seats before	40	23
Seats won	43	20
Seat change	▲3	▼3
Popular vote	4,379,045	2,661,869
Percentage	55.96%	34.02%
Swing	▼0.02%	▲0.77%
- Democratic gain Republican gain Democratic hold Republican hold 50–60% 60–70% 70–80% 80–90% >90% 50–60% 60–70% 70–80% 80–90% >90%
Majority Leader before election
Andrea Stewart-Cousins
Democratic
Elected Majority Leader
Andrea Stewart-Cousins
Democratic

The 2020 New York State Senate elections were held on November 3, 2020, to elect representatives from all 63 State Senate districts across the U.S. state of New York. Primary elections were held on June 23, 2020.

Prior to the 2020 elections, Democrats held 40 seats in the State Senate, while Republicans held 20 seats and three other seats were vacant. In 2018, Democrats won their greatest share of New York State Senate seats since 1912.

Senate Democrats increased their majority by three seats, flipping five seats from Republican to Democrat while Republicans flipped two seats from Democrat to Republican. This gave Democrats their largest seat share in history, and they acquired a 2/3 supermajority.

== Background ==
By 2018, the State Senate was the last Republican-controlled body in the New York government. In the 2018 elections, Democrats gained eight Senate seats, taking control of the chamber from the Republicans. Previously, Republicans had controlled the Senate for all but three years since World War II, and the Democrats' largest share of New York State Senate seats since 1912. At the beginning of the 2019-2020 legislative session, the Senate Democratic Conference held 39 of the chamber's 63 seats. In July 2019, Simcha Felder — who had caucused with the Republicans during their time in the majority — was accepted into the Senate Democratic Conference, giving the Conference a total of 40 members.

During the 2019-2020 session, Republican Bob Antonacci resigned his seat to become a trial court judge; also, eight other members of the Senate Republican Conference announced that they would not seek re-election in 2020. In June, one of those eight Senate Republicans, Senate Minority Leader John J. Flanagan, announced that he would resign from the Senate to take another position. On July 20, 2020, Republican Sen. Chris Jacobs stepped down after being elected to the United States House of Representatives.

Before the 2020 elections, Democrats held 40 seats in the State Senate. Republicans held 20 seats, and three other seats were vacant.

== Predictions ==
Source	Ranking	As of
The Cook Political Report	Safe D	October 21, 2020

== Results ==
Following the 2020 elections, the New York State Board of Elections noted that county boards of elections "received a historically high number of absentee ballots for the November 3rd 2020 General Election due to the coronavirus pandemic", and added that "unofficial election night results do not include the results of absentee ballot voting". On Election Day, preliminary results showed Republicans leading in most competitive State Senate races. However, absentee ballots trended in favor of the Democrats.

On November 23, 2020, Senate Majority Leader Andrea Stewart-Cousins asserted that Senate Democrats would enter 2021 with "a supermajority of at least 42 members", giving the party an "unprecedented share" of power in the state Legislature. According to Politico, "the numbers mean that Democratic legislators now have the two-thirds needed in each house to override any vetoes from Gov. Andrew Cuomo without relying on Republican support".

The results of the 2020 Senate elections were certified on December 3, 2020. Democrats won a total of 43 seats, while Republicans won 20. Republican Alexis Weik defeated Democratic incumbent Monica Martinez in the 3rd district, and Republican Mike Martucci defeated Democratic incumbent Jen Metzger in the 42nd district. Democrats Michelle Hinchey, John Mannion, Samra Brouk, Jeremy Cooney, and Sean Ryan won open seats that had previously been held by Republicans.

2020 New York State Senate election results
Party	Votes	%	% +/–	Seats	Seats +/–
Democratic	4,379,045	55.96%	▼0.02%	43	▲3
Republican	2,661,869	34.02%	▲0.77%	20	0
Conservative	331,602	4.24%	▼0.14%		
Working Families	308,013	3.94%	▲1.46%		
Independence	108,139	1.38%	▼1.31%		
Libertarian	20,860	0.27%	▲0.27%		
SAM	4,650	0.06%	▲0.06%		
Green	3,111	0.04%	▼0.14%		
Total votes	7,824,767	**100.00%**			
Registered voters/turnout	13,555,547	57.72%			

Popular vote
**Democratic**	55.96%
Republican	34.02%
Other	10.02%

House seats by party nomination
**Democratic**	68.26%
Working Families	46.03%
Independence	41.27%
Conservative	33.33%
Republican	33.33%
Serve America	11.11%
Libertarian	1.59%

House seats by party registration
**Democratic**	68.25%
Republican	31.75%

=== By district ===
Bold represents a flip and italics represent a new senator of the same party.

District	Incumbent	Party	Elected Senator	Party
1	Kenneth LaValle	Rep	Anthony Palumbo	Rep
2	(Vacant)	Rep	Mario Mattera	Rep
3	Monica Martinez	Dem	**Alexis Weik**	**Rep**
4	Phil Boyle	Rep	Phil Boyle	Rep
5	Jim Gaughran	Dem	Jim Gaughran	Dem
6	Kevin Thomas	Dem	Kevin Thomas	Dem
7	Anna Kaplan	Dem	Anna Kaplan	Dem
8	John Brooks	Dem	John Brooks	Dem
9	Todd Kaminsky	Dem	Todd Kaminsky	Dem
10	James Sanders Jr.	Dem	James Sanders Jr.	Dem
11	John Liu	Dem	John Liu	Dem
12	Michael Gianaris	Dem	Michael Gianaris	Dem
13	Jessica Ramos	Dem	Jessica Ramos	Dem
14	Leroy Comrie	Dem	Leroy Comrie	Dem
15	Joseph Addabbo Jr.	Dem	Joseph Addabbo Jr.	Dem
16	Toby Ann Stavisky	Dem	Toby Ann Stavisky	Dem
17	Simcha Felder	Dem	Simcha Felder	Dem
18	Julia Salazar	Dem	Julia Salazar	Dem
19	Roxanne Persaud	Dem	Roxanne Persaud	Dem
20	Zellnor Myrie	Dem	Zellnor Myrie	Dem
21	Kevin Parker	Dem	Kevin Parker	Dem
22	Andrew Gounardes	Dem	Andrew Gounardes	Dem
23	Diane Savino	Dem	Diane Savino	Dem
24	Andrew Lanza	Rep	Andrew Lanza	Rep
25	Velmanette Montgomery	Dem	Jabari Brisport	Dem
26	Brian P. Kavanagh	Dem	Brian P. Kavanagh	Dem
27	Brad Hoylman	Dem	Brad Hoylman	Dem
28	Liz Krueger	Dem	Liz Krueger	Dem
29	Jose M. Serrano	Dem	Jose M. Serrano	Dem
30	Brian Benjamin	Dem	Brian Benjamin	Dem
31	Robert Jackson	Dem	Robert Jackson	Dem
32	Luis R. Sepúlveda	Dem	Luis R. Sepúlveda	Dem
33	Gustavo Rivera	Dem	Gustavo Rivera	Dem
34	Alessandra Biaggi	Dem	Alessandra Biaggi	Dem
35	Andrea Stewart-Cousins	Dem	Andrea Stewart-Cousins	Dem
36	Jamaal Bailey	Dem	Jamaal Bailey	Dem
37	Shelley Mayer	Dem	Shelley Mayer	Dem
38	David Carlucci	Dem	Elijah Reichlin-Melnick	Dem
39	James Skoufis	Dem	James Skoufis	Dem
40	Peter Harckham	Dem	Peter Harckham	Dem
41	Sue Serino	Rep	Sue Serino	Rep
42	Jen Metzger	Dem	**Mike Martucci**	**Rep**
43	Daphne Jordan	Rep	Daphne Jordan	Rep
44	Neil Breslin	Dem	Neil Breslin	Dem
45	Betty Little	Rep	Dan Stec	Rep
46	George A. Amedore Jr.	Rep	**Michelle Hinchey**	**Dem**
47	Joseph Griffo	Rep	Joseph Griffo	Rep
48	Patty Ritchie	Rep	Patty Ritchie	Rep
49	Jim Tedisco	Rep	Jim Tedisco	Rep
50	(Vacant)	Rep	**John Mannion**	**Dem**
51	James Seward	Rep	Peter Oberacker	Rep
52	Fred Akshar	Rep	Fred Akshar	Rep
53	Rachel May	Dem	Rachel May	Dem
54	Pam Helming	Rep	Pam Helming	Rep
55	Richard Funke	Rep	**Samra Brouk**	**Dem**
56	Joseph Robach	Rep	**Jeremy Cooney**	**Dem**
57	George Borrello	Rep	George Borrello	Rep
58	Tom O'Mara	Rep	Tom O'Mara	Rep
59	Patrick Gallivan	Rep	Patrick Gallivan	Rep
60	(Vacant)	Rep	**Sean Ryan**	**Dem**
61	Michael Ranzenhofer	Rep	Edward Rath III	Rep
62	Robert Ortt	Rep	Robert Ortt	Rep
63	Timothy Kennedy	Dem	Timothy Kennedy	Dem

=== Close races ===
Districts where the margin of victory was under 10%:

1. **State Senate district 42, 1.02% (gain)**
2. **State Senate district 5, 1.92%**
3. **State Senate district 6, 1.96%**
4. **State Senate district 46, 1.99% (gain)**
5. **State Senate district 1, 2.74%**
6. **State Senate district 22, 3.76%**
7. **State Senate district 40, 3.8%**
8. **State Senate district 3, 3.86% (gain)**
9. **State Senate district 41, 5.04%**
10. **State Senate district 50, 5.14% (gain)**
11. **State Senate district 43, 5.34%**
12. **State Senate district 38, 7.48%**
13. **State Senate district 61, 7.6%**

== Detailed results ==
=== District 1 ===
==== Democratic primary ====
Democratic primary results
Party	Candidate	Votes	%
Democratic	Laura Ahearn	8,427	34.26
Democratic	Valerie Cartright	6,569	26.71
Democratic	Thomas Schiavoni	5,822	23.67
Democratic	Skyler Johnson	2,827	11.49
Democratic	Nora Higgins	952	3.87
Total valid votes		24,597	94.43
Rejected ballots		1,451	5.57
Total votes		26,048	100.00

==== General election ====
2020 New York's 1st State Senate district election
Party	Candidate	Votes	%
Republican	Anthony Palumbo	77,666	45.56
Conservative	Anthony Palumbo	9,897	5.81
Total	Anthony Palumbo	87,563	51.37
Democratic	Laura Ahearn	81,543	47.84
Protect the Taxpayer	Laura Ahearn	1,357	0.80
Total	Laura Ahearn	82,900	48.63
Total valid votes		170,463	94.59
Rejected ballots		9,745	5.41
Total votes		180,208	100.00
Republican hold			

=== District 2 ===
2020 New York's 2nd State Senate district election
Party	Candidate	Votes	%
Republican	Mario Mattera	81,592	49.73
Conservative	Mario Mattera	9,623	5.87
Independence	Mario Mattera	1,684	1.03
Safe Neighborhoods	Mario Mattera	325	0.20
Total	Mario Mattera	93,224	56.82
Democratic	Michael Siderakis	70,833	43.18
Total valid votes		164,057	92.89
Rejected ballots		12,559	7.11
Total votes		176,616	100.00
Republican hold			

=== District 3 ===
2020 New York's 3rd State Senate district election
Party	Candidate	Votes	%
Republican	Alexis Weik	60,171	45.71
Conservative	Alexis Weik	8,192	6.22
Total	Alexis Weik	68,363	51.93
Democratic	Monica Martinez	61,596	46.79
Independence	Monica Martinez	1,690	1.28
Total	Monica Martinez (incumbent)	63,286	48.07
Total valid votes		131,649	93.72
Rejected ballots		8,825	6.28
Total votes		140,474	100.00
Republican gain from Democratic			

=== District 4 ===
2020 New York's 4th State Senate district election
Party	Candidate	Votes	%
Republican	Phil Boyle	69,651	48.49
Conservative	Phil Boyle	8,200	5.71
Independence	Phil Boyle	1,725	1.20
Total	Phil Boyle (incumbent)	79,576	55.40
Democratic	Christine Pellegrino	60,194	41.91
Working Families	Christine Pellegrino	3,862	2.69
Total	Christine Pellegrino	64,056	44.60
Total valid votes		143,632	92.81
Rejected ballots		11,131	7.19
Total votes		154,763	100.00
Republican hold			

=== District 5 ===
2020 New York's 5th State Senate district election
Party	Candidate	Votes	%
Democratic	Jim Gaughran	84,137	50.21
SAM	Jim Gaughran	343	0.20
Total	Jim Gaughran (incumbent)	84,480	50.41
Republican	Edmund Smyth	71,832	42.87
Conservative	Edmund Smyth	7,364	4.39
Independence	Edmund Smyth	1,326	0.79
Libertarian	Edmund Smyth	741	0.44
Total	Edmund Smyth	81,263	48.49
Green	Barbara Wagner	1,831	1.09
Total valid votes		167,574	92.94
Rejected ballots		12,735	7.06
Total votes		180,309	100.00
Democratic hold			

=== District 6 ===
==== Libertarian primary ====
Libertarian primary results
Party	Candidate	Votes	%
Libertarian	Jonathan Gunther	26	83.87
Libertarian	Dennis Dunne Sr.	5	16.13
Total valid votes		31	68.89
Rejected ballots		14	31.11
Total votes		45	100.00

==== General election ====
2020 New York's 6th State Senate district election
Party	Candidate	Votes	%
Democratic	Kevin Thomas	74,035	49.01
Working Families	Kevin Thomas	2,553	1.69
Total	Kevin Thomas (incumbent)	76,588	50.70
Republican	Dennis Dunne Sr.	66,631	44.10
Conservative	Dennis Dunne Sr.	6,088	4.03
Independence	Dennis Dunne Sr.	911	0.60
Total	Dennis Dunne Sr.	73,630	48.74
Libertarian	Jonathan Gunther	855	0.57
Total valid votes		151,073	92.24
Rejected ballots		12,707	7.76
Total votes		163,780	100.00
Democratic hold			

=== District 7 ===
2020 New York's 7th State Senate district election
Party	Candidate	Votes	%
Democratic	Anna Kaplan	84,635	54.44
Working Families	Anna Kaplan	3,319	2.13
Independence	Anna Kaplan	1,269	0.82
SAM	Anna Kaplan	64	0.04
Total	Anna Kaplan (incumbent)	89,287	57.44
Republican	David Franklin	60,830	39.13
Conservative	David Franklin	5,340	3.43
Total	David Franklin	66,170	42.56
Total valid votes		155,457	92.18
Rejected ballots		13,193	7.82
Total votes		168,650	100.00
Democratic hold			

=== District 8 ===
2020 New York's 8th State Senate district election
Party	Candidate	Votes	%
Democratic	John Brooks	80,497	86.59
Working Families	John Brooks	7,578	8.15
Independence	John Brooks	4,885	5.25
Total	John Brooks (incumbent)	92,960	100.00
Total valid votes		92,960	54.99
Rejected ballots		76,096	45.01
Total votes		169,056	100.00
Democratic hold			

=== District 9 ===
2020 New York's 9th State Senate district election
Party	Candidate	Votes	%
Democratic	Todd Kaminsky	92,414	56.70
Independence	Todd Kaminsky	1,608	0.99
Total	Todd Kaminsky (incumbent)	94,022	57.69
Republican	Victoria Johnson	63,043	38.68
Conservative	Victoria Johnson	5,918	3.63
Total	Victoria Johnson	68,961	42.31
Total valid votes		162,983	92.02
Rejected ballots		14,138	7.98
Total votes		177,121	100.00
Democratic hold			

=== District 10 ===
2020 New York's 10th State Senate district election
Party	Candidate	Votes	%
Democratic	James Sanders Jr.	88,990	94.11
Working Families	James Sanders Jr.	5,565	5.89
Total	James Sanders Jr. (incumbent)	94,555	100.00
Total valid votes		94,555	87.84
Rejected ballots		13,094	12.16
Total votes		107,649	100.00
Democratic hold			

=== District 11 ===
2020 New York's 11th State Senate district election
Party	Candidate	Votes	%
Democratic	John Liu	72,673	58.50
Working Families	John Liu	6,145	4.95
Total	John Liu (incumbent)	78,818	63.45
Republican	Elisa Nahoum	40,859	32.89
Conservative	Elisa Nahoum	3,601	2.90
Save Our City	Elisa Nahoum	940	0.76
Total	Elisa Nahoum	45,400	36.55
Total valid votes		124,218	94.74
Rejected ballots		6,890	5.26
Total votes		131,108	100.00
Democratic hold			

=== District 12 ===
==== Democratic primary ====
Democratic primary results
Party	Candidate	Votes	%
Democratic	Michael Gianaris (incumbent)	27,759	79.04
Democratic	Ignazio Terranova	7,361	20.96
Total valid votes		35,120	91.56
Rejected ballots		3,239	8.44
Total votes		38,359	100.00

==== General election ====
2020 New York's 12th State Senate district election
Party	Candidate	Votes	%
Democratic	Michael Gianaris	81,795	81.25
Working Families	Michael Gianaris	18,876	18.75
Total	Michael Gianaris (incumbent)	100,671	100.00
Total valid votes		100,671	82.11
Rejected ballots		21,928	17.89
Total votes		122,599	100.00
Democratic hold			

=== District 13 ===
==== Democratic primary ====
Democratic primary results
Party	Candidate	Votes	%
Democratic	Jessica Ramos (incumbent)	19,525	85.70
Democratic	Diana Sanchez	3,257	14.30
Total valid votes		22,782	89.54
Rejected ballots		2,660	10.45
Total votes		25,442	100.00

==== General election ====
2020 New York's 13th State Senate district election
Party	Candidate	Votes	%
Democratic	Jessica Ramos	56,542	70.65
Working Families	Jessica Ramos	6,343	7.93
Total	Jessica Ramos (incumbent)	62,885	78.58
Republican	Jesus Gonzalez	15,467	19.33
Conservative	Jesus Gonzalez	1,271	1.59
Save Our City	Jesus Gonzalez	403	0.50
Total	Jesus Gonzalez	17,141	21.42
Total valid votes		80,026	94.49
Rejected ballots		4,666	5.51
Total votes		84,692	100.00
Democratic hold			

=== District 14 ===
2020 New York's 14th State Senate district election
Party	Candidate	Votes	%
Democratic	Leroy Comrie (incumbent)	110,626	100.00
Total valid votes		110,626	87.27
Rejected ballots		16,141	12.73
Total votes		126,767	100.00
Democratic hold			

=== District 15 ===
2020 New York's 15th State Senate district election
Party	Candidate	Votes	%
Democratic	Joseph Addabbo Jr. (incumbent)	68,829	58.26
Republican	Thomas Sullivan	44,108	37.34
Conservative	Thomas Sullivan	3,980	3.37
Save Our City	Thomas Sullivan	1,218	1.03
Total	Thomas Sullivan	49,306	41.74
Total valid votes		118,135	94.51
Rejected ballots		6,856	5.49
Total votes		124,991	100.00
Democratic hold			

=== District 16 ===
2020 New York's 16th State Senate district election
Party	Candidate	Votes	%
Democratic	Toby Ann Stavisky (incumbent)	65,240	100.00
Total valid votes		65,240	70.58
Rejected ballots		27,195	29.42
Total votes		92,435	100.00
Democratic hold			

=== District 17 ===
2020 New York's 17th State Senate district election
Party	Candidate	Votes	%
Republican	Simcha Felder	42,332	53.82
Democratic	Simcha Felder	31,476	40.02
Conservative	Simcha Felder	4,842	6.16
Total	Simcha Felder (incumbent)	78,650	100.00
Total valid votes		78,650	89.15
Rejected ballots		9,568	10.85
Total votes		88,218	100.00
Democratic hold			

=== District 18 ===
==== Democratic primary ====
Democratic primary results
Party	Candidate	Votes	%
Democratic	Julia Salazar (incumbent)	28,590	86.86
Democratic	Andy Marte	4,324	13.14
Total valid votes		32,914	92.17
Rejected ballots		2,796	7.83
Total votes		35,710	100.00

==== General election ====
2020 New York's 18th State Senate district election
Party	Candidate	Votes	%
Democratic	Julia Salazar	77,797	79.24
Working Families	Julia Salazar	18,142	18.48
Total	Julia Salazar (incumbent)	95,939	97.72
New Moderate	Daniel Christmann	2,235	2.28
Total valid votes		98,174	88.66
Rejected ballots		12,557	11.34
Total votes		110,731	100.00
Democratic hold			

=== District 19 ===
==== Democratic primary ====
Democratic primary results
Party	Candidate	Votes	%
Democratic	Roxanne Persaud (incumbent)	19,924	75.04
Democratic	Keron Alleyne	6,627	24.96
Total valid votes		26,551	90.64
Rejected ballots		2,741	9.36
Total votes		29,292	100.00

==== General election ====
2020 New York's 19th State Senate district election
Party	Candidate	Votes	%
Democratic	Roxanne Persaud (incumbent)	95,755	100.00
Total valid votes		95,755	83.81
Rejected ballots		18,500	16.19
Total votes		114,255	100.00
Democratic hold			

=== District 20 ===
2020 New York's 20th State Senate district election
Party	Candidate	Votes	%
Democratic	Zellnor Myrie	83,080	81.40
Working Families	Zellnor Myrie	16,411	16.08
Total	Zellnor Myrie (incumbent)	99,491	97.48
Libertarian	Tucker Coburn	2,570	2.52
Total valid votes		102,061	91.43
Rejected ballots		9,561	8.57
Total votes		111,622	100.00
Democratic hold			

=== District 21 ===
2020 New York's 21st State Senate district election
Party	Candidate	Votes	%
Democratic	Kevin Parker (incumbent)	118,738	100.00
Total valid votes		118,738	89.29
Rejected ballots		14,236	10.71
Total votes		132,974	100.00
Democratic hold			

=== District 22 ===
2020 New York's 22nd State Senate district election
Party	Candidate	Votes	%
Democratic	Andrew Gounardes	46,001	46.28
Working Families	Andrew Gounardes	5,301	5.33
SAM	Andrew Gounardes	263	0.26
Total	Andrew Gounardes (incumbent)	51,565	51.88
Republican	Vito Bruno	43,719	43.98
Conservative	Vito Bruno	3,821	3.84
Independence	Vito Bruno	290	0.29
Total	Vito Bruno	47,830	48.12
Total valid votes		99,395	95.19
Rejected ballots		5,025	4.81
Total votes		104,420	100.00
Democratic hold			

=== District 23 ===
==== Democratic primary ====
Democratic primary results
Party	Candidate	Votes	%
Democratic	Diane Savino (incumbent)	12,473	73.41
Democratic	Rajiv Gowda	4,517	26.59
Total valid votes		16,990	93.36
Rejected ballots		1,208	6.64
Total votes		18,198	100.00

==== General election ====
2020 New York's 23rd State Senate district election
Party	Candidate	Votes	%
Democratic	Diane Savino	62,116	75.83
Independence	Diane Savino	1,432	1.75
Total	Diane Savino (incumbent)	63,548	77.58
Conservative	Justin DeFilippo	17,336	21.16
SAM	John Jairo Rodriguez	1,031	1.26
Total valid votes		81,915	77.53
Rejected ballots		23,745	22.47
Total votes		105,660	100.00
Democratic hold			

=== District 24 ===
2020 New York's 24th State Senate district election
Party	Candidate	Votes	%
Republican	Andrew Lanza	112,028	86.25
Conservative	Andrew Lanza	11,400	8.78
Independence	Andrew Lanza	6,468	4.98
Total	Andrew Lanza (incumbent)	129,896	100.00
Total valid votes		129,896	79.95
Rejected ballots		32,582	20.05
Total votes		162,478	100.00
Republican hold			

=== District 25 ===
==== Democratic primary ====
Democratic primary results
Party	Candidate	Votes	%
Democratic	Jabari Brisport	32,967	57.64
Democratic	Tremaine Wright	20,009	34.99
Democratic	Jason Salmon	4,215	7.37
Total valid votes		57,191	94.89
Rejected ballots		3,080	5.11
Total votes		60,271	100.00

==== General election ====
2020 New York's 25th State Senate district election
Party	Candidate	Votes	%
Democratic	Jabari Brisport	108,059	78.16
Working Families	Jabari Brisport	30,202	21.84
Total	Jabari Brisport	138,261	100.00
Total valid votes		138,261	92.96
Rejected ballots		10,465	7.04
Total votes		148,726	100.00
Democratic hold			

=== District 26 ===
2020 New York's 26th State Senate district election
Party	Candidate	Votes	%
Democratic	Brian P. Kavanagh (incumbent)	95,552	79.06
Republican	Lester Chang	22,549	18.66
Conservative	Lester Chang	2,752	2.28
Total	Lester Chang	25,301	20.94
Total valid votes		120,853	92.96
Rejected ballots		9,147	7.04
Total votes		130,000	100.00
Democratic hold			

=== District 27 ===
==== Democratic primary ====
Democratic primary results
Party	Candidate	Votes	%
Democratic	Brad Hoylman (incumbent)	31,920	74.45
Democratic	Elizabeth Glass	10,957	25.55
Total valid votes		42,877	87.74
Rejected ballots		5,994	12.26
Total votes		48,871	100.00

==== General election ====
2020 New York's 27th State Senate district election
Party	Candidate	Votes	%
Democratic	Brad Hoylman	110,256	86.18
Working Families	Brad Hoylman	17,686	13.82
Total	Brad Hoylman (incumbent)	127,942	100.00
Total valid votes		127,942	86.74
Rejected ballots		19,562	13.26
Total votes		147,504	100.00
Democratic hold			

=== District 28 ===
2020 New York's 28th State Senate district election
Party	Candidate	Votes	%
Democratic	Liz Krueger	105,441	72.72
Working Families	Liz Krueger	7,668	5.29
Total	Liz Krueger (incumbent)	113,109	78.01
Republican	Michael Zumbluskas	31,224	21.53
Independence	Michael Zumbluskas	664	0.46
Total	Michael Zumbluskas	31,888	21.99
Total valid votes		144,997	96.58
Rejected ballots		5,140	3.42
Total votes		150,137	100.00
Democratic hold			

=== District 29 ===
2020 New York's 29th State Senate district election
Party	Candidate	Votes	%
Democratic	José M. Serrano (incumbent)	88,643	87.92
Republican	José Colón	12,175	12.08
Total valid votes		100,818	94.43
Rejected ballots		5,950	5.57
Total votes		106,768	100.00
Democratic hold			

=== District 30 ===
2020 New York's 30th State Senate district election
Party	Candidate	Votes	%
Democratic	Brian Benjamin (incumbent)	115,397	93.16
Republican	Oz Sultan	8,477	6.84
Total valid votes		123,874	92.62
Rejected ballots		9,868	7.38
Total votes		133,742	100.00
Democratic hold			

=== District 31 ===
==== Democratic primary ====
Democratic primary results
Party	Candidate	Votes	%
Democratic	Robert Jackson (incumbent)	30,437	84.34
Democratic	Tirso Santiago Piña	5,653	15.66
Total valid votes		36,090	83.13
Rejected ballots		7,325	16.87
Total votes		43,415	100.00

==== General election ====
2020 New York's 31st State Senate district election
Party	Candidate	Votes	%
Democratic	Robert Jackson	90,090	74.43
Working Families	Robert Jackson	16,982	14.03
Total	Robert Jackson (incumbent)	107,072	88.47
Republican	Melinda Crump	13,961	11.53
Total valid votes		121,033	93.91
Rejected ballots		7,853	6.09
Total votes		128,886	100.00
Democratic hold			

=== District 32 ===
==== Democratic primary ====
Democratic primary results
Party	Candidate	Votes	%
Democratic	Luis R. Sepúlveda (incumbent)	14,846	54.91
Democratic	Pamela Stewart-Martinez	9,069	33.54
Democratic	John Perez	3,122	11.55
Total valid votes		27,037	84.02
Rejected ballots		5,143	15.98
Total votes		32,180	100.00

==== General election ====
2020 New York's 32nd State Senate district election
Party	Candidate	Votes	%
Democratic	Luis R. Sepúlveda (incumbent)	84,128	95.49
Conservative	Jonathon Weiner	3,971	4.51
Total valid votes		88,099	89.87
Rejected ballots		9,935	10.13
Total votes		98,034	100.00
Democratic hold			

=== District 33 ===
2020 New York's 33rd State Senate district election
Party	Candidate	Votes	%
Democratic	Gustavo Rivera	63,207	82.68
Working Families	Gustavo Rivera	4,061	5.31
Total	Gustavo Rivera (incumbent)	67,268	87.99
Republican	Dustin Martinez	8,288	10.84
Conservative	Steven M. Stern	890	1.16
Total valid votes		76,446	94.59
Rejected ballots		4,369	5.41
Total votes		80,815	100.00
Democratic hold			

=== District 34 ===
==== Democratic primary ====
Democratic primary results
Party	Candidate	Votes	%
Democratic	Alessandra Biaggi (incumbent)	28,664	87.91
Democratic	James Gisondi	3,941	12.09
Total valid votes		32,605	90.33
Rejected ballots		3,489	9.67
Total votes		36,094	100.00

==== General election ====
2020 New York's 34th State Senate district election
Party	Candidate	Votes	%
Democratic	Alessandra Biaggi	76,131	67.26
Working Families	Alessandra Biaggi	7,600	6.71
Total	Alessandra Biaggi (incumbent)	83,731	73.97
Republican	James Gisondi	25,634	22.65
Conservative	Antonio Vitiello	3,829	3.38
Total valid votes		113,194	95.56
Rejected ballots		5,257	4.44
Total votes		118,451	100.00
Democratic hold			

=== District 35 ===
2020 New York's 35th State Senate district election
Party	Candidate	Votes	%
Democratic	Andrea Stewart-Cousins	93,833	90.36
Working Families	Andrea Stewart-Cousins	10,006	9.63
Total	Andrea Stewart-Cousins (incumbent)	103,839	100.00
Total valid votes		103,839	75.62
Rejected ballots		33,479	24.38
Total votes		137,318	100.00
Democratic hold			

=== District 36 ===
2020 New York's 36th State Senate district election
Party	Candidate	Votes	%
Democratic	Jamaal Bailey	98,098	95.48
Conservative	Robert Diamond	4,649	4.52
Total valid votes		102,747	91.18
Rejected ballots		9,945	8.82
Total votes		112,692	100.00
Democratic hold			

=== District 37 ===
2020 New York's 37th State Senate district election
Party	Candidate	Votes	%
Democratic	Shelley Mayer	84,087	58.32
Working Families	Shelley Mayer	5,831	4.04
SAM	Shelley Mayer	228	0.16
Total	Shelley Mayer (incumbent)	90,146	62.52
Republican	Liviu Saimovici	47,890	33.22
Conservative	Liviu Saimovici	6,146	4.26
Total	Liviu Saimovici	54,036	37.48
Total valid votes		144,182	91.30
Rejected ballots		13,736	8.70
Total votes		157,918	100.00
Democratic hold			

=== District 38 ===
==== Democratic primary ====
Democratic primary results
Party	Candidate	Votes	%
Democratic	Elijah Reichlin-Melnick	12,542	45.63
Democratic	Justin Sweet	10,042	36.54
Democratic	Eudson Francois	4,902	17.83
Total valid votes		27,486	81.07
Rejected ballots		6,418	18.93
Total votes		33,904	100.00

==== Republican primary ====
Republican primary results
Party	Candidate	Votes	%
Republican	William Weber Jr.	4,617	71.02
Republican	Matthew Weinberg	1,884	28.98
Total valid votes		6,501	94.99
Rejected ballots		343	5.01
Total votes		6,844	100.00

==== General election ====
2020 New York's 38th State Senate district election
Party	Candidate	Votes	%
Democratic	Elijah Reichlin-Melnick	65,707	49.87
Working Families	Elijah Reichlin-Melnick	5,102	3.87
Total	Elijah Reichlin-Melnick	70,809	53.74
Republican	William Weber Jr.	59,654	45.27
SAM	William Weber Jr.	1,301	0.99
Total	William Weber Jr.	60,955	46.26
Total valid votes		131,764	90.91
Rejected ballots		13,172	9.09
Total votes		144,936	100.00
Democratic hold			

=== District 39 ===
2020 New York's 39th State Senate district election
Party	Candidate	Votes	%
Democratic	James Skoufis	66,794	52.53
Working Families	James Skoufis	5,358	4.21
SAM	James Skoufis	404	0.32
Total	James Skoufis (incumbent)	72,556	57.06
Republican	Steve Brescia	48,641	38.25
Conservative	Steve Brescia	5,963	4.69
Total	Steve Brescia	54,604	42.94
Total valid votes		127,160	94.11
Rejected ballots		7,964	5.89
Total votes		135,124	100.00
Democratic hold			

=== District 40 ===
2020 New York's 40th State Senate district election
Party	Candidate	Votes	%
Democratic	Peter Harckham	77,414	47.93
Working Families	Peter Harckham	5,466	3.38
Independence	Peter Harckham	939	0.58
Total	Peter Harckham (incumbent)	83,819	51.90
Republican	Rob Astorino	69,867	43.26
Conservative	Rob Astorino	7,276	4.50
Rebuild Our State	Rob Astorino	545	0.34
Total	Rob Astorino	77,688	48.10
Total valid votes		161,507	95.84
Rejected ballots		7,012	4.16
Total votes		168,519	100.00
Democratic hold			

=== District 41 ===
2020 New York's 41st State Senate district election
Party	Candidate	Votes	%
Republican	Sue Serino	69,462	45.00
Conservative	Sue Serino	9,021	5.84
Independence	Sue Serino	2,142	1.39
Rebuild Our State	Sue Serino	455	0.29
Total	Sue Serino (incumbent)	81,080	52.52
Democratic	Karen Smythe	66,922	43.35
Working Families	Karen Smythe	6,158	3.99
SAM	Karen Smythe	208	0.13
Total	Karen Smythe	73,288	47.48
Total valid votes		154,368	96.64
Rejected ballots		5,374	3.36
Total votes		159,742	100.00
Republican hold			

=== District 42 ===
2020 New York's 42nd State Senate district election
Party	Candidate	Votes	%
Republican	Mike Martucci	60,003	44.73
Conservative	Mike Martucci	6,311	4.70
Independence	Mike Martucci	1,445	1.08
Total	Mike Martucci	67,759	50.51
Democratic	Jen Metzger	59,812	44.58
Working Families	Jen Metzger	6,310	4.70
SAM	Jen Metzger	272	0.20
Total	Jen Metzger (incumbent)	66,394	49.49
Total valid votes		134,153	95.28
Rejected ballots		6,650	4.72
Total votes		140,803	100.00
Republican gain from Democratic			

=== District 43 ===
2020 New York's 43rd State Senate district election
Party	Candidate	Votes	%
Republican	Daphne Jordan	74,142	45.33
Conservative	Daphne Jordan	8,944	5.47
Independence	Daphne Jordan	3,060	1.87
Total	Daphne Jordan (incumbent)	86,146	52.67
Democratic	Patrick Nelson	69,157	42.28
Working Families	Patrick Nelson	8,268	5.05
Total	Patrick Nelson	77,425	47.33
Total valid votes		163,571	96.17
Rejected ballots		6,517	3.83
Total votes		170,088	100.00
Republican hold			

=== District 44 ===
2020 New York's 44th State Senate district election
Party	Candidate	Votes	%
Democratic	Neil Breslin	80,255	63.05
Working Families	Neil Breslin	10,144	7.97
Independence	Neil Breslin	2,616	2.06
Total	Neil Breslin (incumbent)	93,015	73.08
Republican	David Yule	34,269	26.92
Total valid votes		127,284	95.06
Rejected ballots		6,614	4.94
Total votes		133,898	100.00
Democratic hold			

=== District 45 ===
2020 New York's 45th State Senate district election
Party	Candidate	Votes	%
Republican	Dan Stec	69,596	51.53
Conservative	Dan Stec	6,330	4.69
Independence	Dan Stec	2,210	1.64
Total	Dan Stec	78,136	57.85
Democratic	Kimberly Davis	51,922	38.44
Working Families	Kimberly Davis	5,006	3.71
Total	Kimberly Davis	56,928	42.15
Total valid votes		135,064	96.76
Rejected ballots		4,523	3.24
Total votes		139,587	100.00
Republican hold			

=== District 46 ===
2020 New York's 46th State Senate district election
Party	Candidate	Votes	%
Democratic	Michelle Hinchey	68,167	44.15
Working Families	Michelle Hinchey	9,935	6.43
Total	Michelle Hinchey	78,102	50.58
Republican	Richard Amedure Jr.	64,227	41.59
Conservative	Richard Amedure Jr.	8,738	5.66
Independence	Richard Amedure Jr.	2,069	1.34
Total	Richard Amedure Jr.	75,034	48.59
Green	Robert Alft Jr.	1,280	0.83
Total valid votes		154,416	96.65
Rejected ballots		5,357	3.35
Total votes		159,773	100.00
Democratic gain from Republican			

=== District 47 ===
2020 New York's 47th State Senate district election
Party	Candidate	Votes	%
Republican	Joseph Griffo	80,723	80.13
Conservative	Joseph Griffo	10,126	10.05
Independence	Joseph Griffo	9,891	9.82
Total	Joseph Griffo (incumbent)	100,740	100.00
Total valid votes		100,740	78.63
Rejected ballots		27,380	21.37
Total votes		128,120	100.00
Republican hold			

=== District 48 ===
2020 New York's 48th State Senate district election
Party	Candidate	Votes	%
Republican	Patty Ritchie	80,176	81.55
Conservative	Patty Ritchie	10,580	10.76
Independence	Patty Ritchie	7,559	7.69
Total	Patty Ritchie (incumbent)	98,315	100.00
Total valid votes		98,315	80.46
Rejected ballots		23,876	19.54
Total votes		122,191	100.00
Republican hold			

=== District 49 ===
==== Democratic primary ====
Democratic primary results
Party	Candidate	Votes	%
Democratic	Thearse McCalmon	10,671	73.66
Democratic	Donovan McRae	3,816	26.34
Total valid votes		14,487	91.29
Rejected ballots		1,382	8.71
Total votes		15,869	100.00

==== General election ====
2020 New York's 49th State Senate district election
Party	Candidate	Votes	%
Republican	Jim Tedisco	78,404	54.18
Conservative	Jim Tedisco	9,982	6.90
Independence	Jim Tedisco	3,549	2.45
Total	Jim Tedisco (incumbent)	91,935	63.53
Democratic	Thearse McCalmon	52,781	36.47
Total valid votes		144,716	95.79
Rejected ballots		6,363	4.21
Total votes		151,079	100.00
Republican hold			

=== District 50 ===
2020 New York's 50th State Senate district election
Party	Candidate	Votes	%
Democratic	John Mannion	77,293	48.85
Working Families	John Mannion	5,889	3.72
Total	John Mannion	83,182	52.57
Republican	Angi Renna	62,929	39.77
Conservative	Angi Renna	9,806	6.20
Independence	Angi Renna	2,308	1.46
Total	Angi Renna	75,043	47.43
Total valid votes		158,225	96.53
Rejected ballots		5,687	3.47
Total votes		163,912	100.00
Democratic gain from Republican			

=== District 51 ===
2020 New York's 51st State Senate district election
Party	Candidate	Votes	%
Republican	Peter Oberacker	65,531	49.76
Conservative	Peter Oberacker	5,448	4.14
Independence	Peter Oberacker	2,021	1.53
Total	Peter Oberacker	73,000	55.43
Democratic	Jim Barber	58,691	44.57
Total valid votes		131,691	94.49
Rejected ballots		7,685	5.51
Total votes		139,376	100.00
Republican hold			

=== District 52 ===
2020 New York's 52nd State Senate district election
Party	Candidate	Votes	%
Republican	Fred Akshar	80,745	73.50
Independence	Fred Akshar	8,432	7.68
Conservative	Fred Akshar	6,875	6.26
Total	Fred Akshar (incumbent)	96,052	87.44
Libertarian	Thomas Daniel Quiter	13,802	12.56
Total valid votes		109,854	80.47
Rejected ballots		26,669	19.53
Total votes		136,523	100.00
Republican hold			

=== District 53 ===
2020 New York's 53rd State Senate district election
Party	Candidate	Votes	%
Democratic	Rachel May	61,697	50.68
Working Families	Rachel May	5,002	4.11
Total	Rachel May (incumbent)	66,699	54.79
Republican	Sam Rodgers	45,547	37.41
Conservative	Sam Rodgers	6,075	4.99
Independence	Sam Rodgers	2,084	1.71
SAM	Sam Rodgers	102	0.08
Total	Sam Rodgers	53,798	44.19
Libertarian	Russell Penner	1,246	1.02
Total valid votes		121,743	95.28
Rejected ballots		6,025	4.72
Total votes		127,768	100.00
Democratic hold			

=== District 54 ===
2020 New York's 54th State Senate district election
Party	Candidate	Votes	%
Republican	Pam Helming	76,760	53.83
Conservative	Pam Helming	11,483	8.05
Independence	Pam Helming	2,590	1.82
SAM	Pam Helming	154	0.11
Total	Pam Helming (incumbent)	90,987	63.81
Democratic	Shauna O'Toole	51,609	36.19
Total valid votes		142,596	93.43
Rejected ballots		10,029	6.57
Total votes		152,625	100.00
Republican hold			

=== District 55 ===
2020 New York's 55th State Senate district election
Party	Candidate	Votes	%
Democratic	Samra Brouk	83,539	53.04
Working Families	Samra Brouk	6,871	4.36
Total	Samra Brouk	90,410	57.41
Republican	Christopher Missick	56,048	35.59
Conservative	Christopher Missick	8,772	5.57
Independence	Christopher Missick	2,122	1.35
SAM	Christopher Missick	141	0.09
Total	Christopher Missick	67,083	42.59
Total valid votes		157,493	95.10
Rejected ballots		8,112	4.90
Total votes		165,605	100.00
Democratic gain from Republican			

=== District 56 ===
==== Democratic primary ====
Democratic primary results
Party	Candidate	Votes	%
Democratic	Jeremy Cooney	11,134	53.90
Democratic	Hilda Enid Rosario Escher	4,887	23.66
Democratic	Sherita Traywick	4,634	22.44
Total valid votes		20,655	93.53
Rejected ballots		1,428	6.47
Total votes		22,083	100.00

==== General election ====
2020 New York's 56th State Senate district election
Party	Candidate	Votes	%
Democratic	Jeremy Cooney	64,491	51.47
Working Families	Jeremy Cooney	5,460	4.36
Total	Jeremy Cooney	69,951	55.82
Republican	Mike Barry	46,137	36.82
Conservative	Mike Barry	7,572	6.04
Independence	Mike Barry	1,646	1.31
Total	Mike Barry	55,355	44.18
Total valid votes		125,306	93.20
Rejected ballots		9,147	6.80
Total votes		134,453	100.00
Democratic gain from Republican			

=== District 57 ===
2020 New York's 57th State Senate district election
Party	Candidate	Votes	%
Republican	George Borrello	75,790	61.79
Conservative	George Borrello	8,566	6.98
Independence	George Borrello	2,204	1.80
Libertarian	George Borrello	1,374	1.12
Total	George Borrello (incumbent)	87,934	71.70
Democratic	Frank Puglisi	31,967	26.06
Working Families	Frank Puglisi	2,747	2.24
Total	Frank Puglisi	34,714	28.30
Total valid votes		122,648	94.85
Rejected ballots		6,662	5.15
Total votes		129,310	100.00
Republican hold			

=== District 58 ===
2020 New York's 58th State Senate district election
Party	Candidate	Votes	%
Republican	Tom O'Mara	63,815	50.72
Conservative	Tom O'Mara	5,436	4.32
Independence	Tom O'Mara	1,597	1.27
Total	Tom O'Mara (incumbent)	70,848	56.31
Democratic	Leslie Danks Burke	48,193	38.30
Working Families	Leslie Danks Burke	6,499	5.16
SAM	Leslie Danks Burke	284	0.23
Total	Leslie Danks Burke	54,976	43.69
Total valid votes		125,824	96.09
Rejected ballots		5,114	3.91
Total votes		130,938	100.00
Republican hold			

=== District 59 ===
2020 New York's 59th State Senate district election
Party	Candidate	Votes	%
Republican	Patrick M. Gallivan	86,244	54.85
Conservative	Patrick M. Gallivan	15,783	10.04
Independence	Patrick M. Gallivan	4,031	2.56
Total	Patrick M. Gallivan (incumbent)	106,058	67.45
Democratic	Jason Klimek	51,176	32.55
Total valid votes		157,234	95.31
Rejected ballots		7,733	4.69
Total votes		164,967	100.00
Republican hold			

=== District 60 ===
2020 New York's 60th State Senate district election
Party	Candidate	Votes	%
Democratic	Sean Ryan	79,396	52.98
Working Families	Sean Ryan	9,182	6.13
Independence	Sean Ryan	2,452	1.64
Total	Sean Ryan	91,030	60.75
Republican	Joshua Mertzlufft	49,649	33.13
Conservative	Joshua Mertzlufft	9,174	6.12
Total	Joshua Mertzlufft	58,823	39.25
Total valid votes		149,853	95.77
Rejected ballots		6,625	4.23
Total votes		156,478	100.00
Democratic gain from Republican			

=== District 61 ===
==== Democratic primary ====
Democratic primary results
Party	Candidate	Votes	%
Democratic	Jacqueline Berger	9,386	38.79
Democratic	Kim Smith	9,232	38.16
Democratic	Joan Elizabeth Seamans	5,577	23.05
Total valid votes		24,195	93.71
Rejected ballots		1,624	6.29
Total votes		25,819	100.00

==== Independence primary ====
Independence primary results
Party	Candidate	Votes	%
Independence	Edward Rath III	1,003	71.64
Independence	Andrew Gruszka	397	28.36
Total valid votes		1,400	93.02
Rejected ballots		105	6.98
Total votes		1,505	100.00

==== General election ====
2020 New York's 61st State Senate district election
Party	Candidate	Votes	%
Republican	Edward Rath III	66,085	44.75
Conservative	Edward Rath III	10,753	7.28
Independence	Edward Rath III	2,492	1.69
SAM	Edward Rath III	127	0.09
Total	Edward Rath III	79,457	53.80
Democratic	Jacqualine Berger	68,230	46.20
Total valid votes		147,687	94.58
Rejected ballots		8,457	5.42
Total votes		156,144	100.00
Republican gain from			

=== District 62 ===
2020 New York's 62nd State Senate district election
Party	Candidate	Votes	%
Republican	Rob Ortt	77,308	75.88
Conservative	Rob Ortt	13,478	13.23
Independence	Rob Ortt	11,097	10.89
Total	Rob Ortt (incumbent)	101,883	100.00
Total valid votes		101,883	72.60
Rejected ballots		38,451	27.40
Total votes		140,334	100.00
Republican hold			

=== District 63 ===
2020 New York's 63rd State Senate district election
Party	Candidate	Votes	%
Democratic	Timothy M. Kennedy	81,368	85.22
Working Families	Timothy M. Kennedy	10,485	10.98
Independence	Timothy M. Kennedy	3,631	3.80
Total	Timothy M. Kennedy (incumbent)	95,484	100.00
Total valid votes		95,484	78.96
Rejected ballots		25,438	21.04
Total votes		120,922	100.00
Democratic hold			

== See also ==
- 2020 New York state elections
