= New York's 4th State Senate district =

American legislative district

Senator
Monica Martinez; D–Brentwood
- Registration: 35.9% Democratic; 31.0% Republican; 26.3% No party preference
- Demographics: 62% White; 10% Black; 23% Hispanic; 3% Asian; 2% Other
- Population (2018): 313,558
- Registered voters: 213,602

New York's 4th State Senate district is one of 63 districts in the New York State Senate. It has been represented by Democrat Monica Martinez since 2023.

== Geography ==
District 4 is in Suffolk County on Long Island, including portions of Bay Shore, Brentwood, Central Islip, Deer Park, Islandia, North Babylon, West Babylon and Wyandanch.

The district overlaps with New York's 1st and 2nd congressional districts, and with the 5th, 6th, 7th, 9th, 11th, and 12th districts of the New York State Assembly.

== Recent election results ==
=== 2026 ===
2026 New York State Senate election, District 4
Party	Candidate	Votes	%
Democratic	Monica Martinez		
Working Families	Monica Martinez		
Total	Monica Martinez (incumbent)		
Republican	Brianne Wakefield		
Conservative	Brianne Wakefield		
Total	Brianne Wakefield		
Write-in			
Total votes			

=== 2024 ===
2024 New York State Senate election, District 4
Party	Candidate	Votes	%
Democratic	Monica Martinez	58,688	
Working Families	Monica Martinez	3,328	
Total	Monica Martinez (incumbent)	62,016	56.4
Republican	Teresa Bryant	42,538	
Conservative	Teresa Bryant	5,207	
Total	Teresa Bryant	47,745	43.5
Write-in		72	0.1
Total votes		109,883	100.0
Democratic hold			

=== 2022 ===
2022 New York State Senate election, District 4
Primary election
Party	Candidate	Votes	%
Democratic	Monica Martinez	4,180	65.8
Democratic	Philip Ramos	2,177	34.2
Write-in		0	0.0
Total votes		6,357	100.0
General election
Democratic	Monica Martinez	35,478	
Working Families	Monica Martinez	1,695	
Total	Monica Martinez	37,173	51.4
Republican	Wendy Rodriguez	30,855	
Conservative	Wendy Rodriguez	4,288	
Total	Wendy Rodriguez	35,173	48.6
Write-in		14	0.0
Total votes		72,360	100.0
Democratic win (new boundaries)			

=== 2020 ===
2020 New York State Senate election, District 4
Party	Candidate	Votes	%
Republican	Phil Boyle	69,651	
Conservative	Phil Boyle	8,200	
Independence	Phil Boyle	1,725	
Total	Phil Boyle (incumbent)	79,576	55.4
Democratic	Christine Pellegrino	60,194	
Working Families	Christine Pellegrino	3,862	
Total	Christine Pellegrino	64,056	44.6
Write-in		30	0.0
Total votes		143,662	100.0
Republican hold			

=== 2018 ===
2018 New York State Senate election, District 4
Party	Candidate	Votes	%
Republican	Phil Boyle	46,143	
Conservative	Phil Boyle	5,172	
Independence	Phil Boyle	1,247	
Reform	Phil Boyle	205	
Total	Phil Boyle (incumbent)	52,767	51.8
Democratic	Lou D'Amaro	47,294	
Working Families	Lou D'Amaro	1,194	
Women's Equality	Lou D'Amaro	643	
Total	Lou D'Amaro	49,131	48.2
Write-in		25	0.0
Total votes		101,923	100.0
Republican hold			

=== 2016 ===
2016 New York State Senate election, District 4
Party	Candidate	Votes	%
Republican	Phil Boyle	63,490	
Conservative	Phil Boyle	9,292	
Independence	Phil Boyle	3,081	
Reform	Phil Boyle	548	
Total	Phil Boyle (incumbent)	76,411	62.8
Democratic	John Alberts	45,232	37.2
Write-in		73	0.0
Total votes		121,716	100.0
Republican hold			

=== 2014 ===
2014 New York State Senate election, District 4
Party	Candidate	Votes	%
Republican	Phil Boyle	29,897	
Conservative	Phil Boyle	5,998	
Independence	Phil Boyle	2,566	
Total	Phil Boyle (incumbent)	38,461	67.8
Democratic	John Alberts	18,282	32.2
Write-in		24	0.0
Total votes		56,767	100.0
Republican hold			

=== 2012 ===
2012 New York State Senate election, District 4
Party	Candidate	Votes	%
Republican	Phil Boyle	43,859	
Conservative	Phil Boyle	8,072	
Independence	Phil Boyle	2,564	
Total	Phil Boyle	54,515	52.6
Democratic	Ricardo Montano	45,766	
Working Families	Ricardo Montano	3,457	
Total	Ricardo Montano	49,223	47.4
Write-in		29	0.0
Total votes		103,767	100.0
Republican hold			

=== Federal results in District 4 ===
Year	Office	Results
2020	President	Trump 50.6 – 47.9%
2016	President	Trump 52.5 – 44.4%
2012	President	Obama 52.9 – 45.9%
2012	Senate	Gillibrand 65.0 – 33.8%
