= 2018 New York state elections =

- November 6, 2018

Elections were held in the State of New York on November 6, 2018. On that date, the State of New York held elections for the following offices: governor and lieutenant governor (on one ticket), attorney general, Comptroller, U.S. Senate, U.S. House of Representatives, New York State Senate, New York state assembly, and various others. Primary elections took place on September 13, 2018. As of May 2018, Democrats had won all 19 elections to statewide offices that had occurred in New York since 2002.

On Election Day, the Democratic Gov. Andrew Cuomo and Lieutenant Governor Kathy Hochul were re-elected, as were incumbent Democratic U.S. senator Kirsten Gillibrand and incumbent Democratic comptroller Tom DiNapoli. Democrat Letitia James was elected attorney general. Democrats won 40 of 63 seats in the New York State Senate, decisively ousting the Republicans from control of that chamber. Democrats also won 21 seats in the U.S. House of Representatives and maintained their State Assembly supermajority.

== Governor ==
Incumbent Democratic governor Andrew Cuomo was re-elected to a second term in 2014. Cuomo ran for a third term in 2018. Actress and activist Cynthia Nixon unsuccessfully challenged Cuomo in the Democratic primary. Incumbent Democratic lieutenant governor Kathy Hochul sought re-election to her current post. Hochul defeated Democratic New York City Councilmember Jumaane Williams in the Democratic primary.

In the general election, the Cuomo/Hochul ticket (running on the Democratic, Working Families, Independence, and Women's Equality lines) defeated Marcus Molinaro and Julie Killian (Republican, Conservative and Reform Parties), Howie Hawkins and Jia Lee (Green Party), Larry Sharpe and Andrew Hollister (Libertarian Party candidate), and Stephanie Miner and Michael Volpe (running on the Serve America Movement line).

== New York State Attorney General ==
Incumbent Democratic Attorney General Eric Schneiderman, who has been in office since 2011, was re-elected in 2014 with 56% of the vote. On May 7, 2018, he resigned his position, the day that an article in The New Yorker reported detailed allegations of abusive behavior toward several women he had dated during his time in the office. A joint session of the New York State Legislature appointed Solicitor General Barbara Underwood to fulfill the remainder of the term; Underwood agreed not to pursue election to a full term.

New York City Public Advocate Letitia "Tish" James secured the state Democratic Party official endorsement in May 2018; Leecia Eve, Sean Patrick Maloney and Zephyr Teachout challenged her in the Democratic primary. The Republicans nominated Keith Wofford for the post. James prevailed in the Democratic primary on September 13, 2018, with 40.6% of the vote. James went on to easily win the general election, with nearly 60% of the vote versus Wofford's 34%. James is the first woman and the first African-American to be elected New York Attorney General.

== New York State Comptroller ==
Incumbent Democratic Comptroller Thomas DiNapoli, who had been in office since 2007, was re-elected in 2014 with 60% of the vote. Jonathan Trichter, a campaign operative and former public finance banker, received the Republican nomination despite his past Democratic Party enrollment. DiNapoli easily defeated Trichter.

== United States Senate ==
Incumbent Democratic senator Kirsten Gillibrand sought re-election to a second full term. The Republican Party nominated private equity executive Chele Chiavacci Farley to challenge Gillibrand. Gillibrand defeated Farley by a wide margin.

== United States House of Representatives ==
All of New York's twenty-seven seats in the United States House of Representatives were up for election in 2018. Democrats defeated three Republican incumbents and won a total of 21 New York House seats, while Republicans won six. Nationally, the Democratic Party won control of the House of Representatives on Election Day.

== New York State Senate ==
In April 2018, The Wall Street Journal called the New York State Senate the "last bastion of power" of the Republican Party in New York.

All 63 seats of the New York State Senate were up for election in 2018. Five Republican members of the state senate—Sens. John Bonacic, Tom Croci, John A. DeFrancisco, Bill Larkin, and Kathy Marchione—had announced that they would not seek re-election in the fall.

In May 2018, City & State rated the following state senate races as competitive:

- District 3 (likely Republican)
- District 5 (lean Republican)
- District 6 (likely Republican)
- District 7 (toss-up)
- District 8 (lean Democrat)
- District 9 (likely Democrat)
- District 17 (wild card)
- District 22 (likely Republican)
- District 39 (likely Republican)
- District 41 (likely Republican)
- District 42 (likely Republican)

On election day 2018, Democrats gained eight Senate seats, taking control of the chamber from the Republicans. The following day, The New York Times wrote that the Democrats had "decisively evict[ed] Republicans from running the State Senate, which they [had] controlled for all but three years since World War II." Enrolled Democrats won a total of 40 seats.

== New York State Assembly ==
All 150 seats in the New York state assembly were up for election in 2018. The Democrats retained their supermajority.
