= Phil Boyle =

American politician

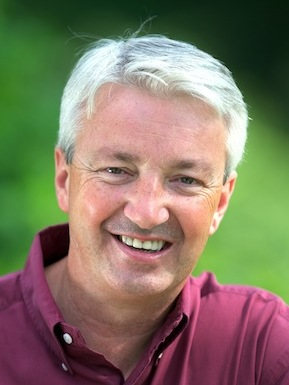

Member of the New York State Senate from the 4th district
- In office January 1, 2013 – December 31, 2022
- Preceded by: Owen H. Johnson
- Succeeded by: Dean Murray (Redistricting)

Member of the New York State Assembly from the 8th district
- In office March 1, 2006 – December 31, 2012
- Preceded by: Thomas F. Barraga
- Succeeded by: Michael J. Fitzpatrick
- In office February 15, 1994 – December 31, 2002
- Preceded by: John C. Cochrane
- Succeeded by: Thomas F. Barraga

Personal details
- Born: July 21, 1961 (age 65) Bay Shore, New York
- Party: Republican
- Spouse: Victoria Ryan
- Education: University of North Carolina, Chapel Hill (AB); University at Albany (MPA); Albany Law School (JD)
- Profession: CEO, Attorney
- Website: https://www.nysenate.gov/senators/phil-boyle

Philip Michael Boyle (born July 21, 1961) is an American politician and Long Island business leader who served as the Senator for the 4th District of the New York Senate from 2013 to 2022. He is a Republican. The district he represented includes the villages of Babylon, Brightwaters, Lindenhurst, Ocean Beach, Saltaire in Suffolk County on Long Island. After leaving the State Senate in 2022, Boyle was named as president and CEO of Suffolk Regional Off-Track Betting (OTB) and Jake's 58 Casino Hotel.

== Early life and education ==
Boyle grew up in East Islip. He attended the State University of New York at Geneseo and transferred to the University of North Carolina at Chapel Hill where he graduated with a Bachelor's Degree in Political Science. He attended Albany Law School where he got his Juris Doctor degree, and also received a Master's in Public Administration from the Rockefeller College of Public Affairs and Policy from the University at Albany. As an attorney, Boyle was a founding partner in the general practice law firm of Steinberg & Boyle, LLP; an Islip Town Assistant Town Attorney; and "Of Counsel" to the law firm of Egan & Golden, LLP.

Boyle and his wife, Victoria Ryan, reside in Bay Shore. Boyle is the stepfather to Patrick and Sarah Ryan.

== Career ==
Phil Boyle served several years on Capitol Hill as a senior congressional aide. Boyle was the legislative director to the late Rep. Frank Horton (R-Rochester) where he played a significant role in expanding the use of forensic DNA in the United States. Subsequently, he served as campaign manager and AA to former Rep. Rick Lazio (R-Brightwaters).

In 1994, Boyle was elected to the New York State Assembly as a representative of the 8th Assembly District. He served as an assembly member for sixteen years where he focused on forensic DNA-related issues and legislation to promote animal welfare.

In 2012, Boyle decided to run for election to the New York Senate, winning a tough race against County Legislator Ricardo Montano 52% to 48%.

=== New York State Senate ===
Soon after his election to the New York State Senate, Boyle founded and chaired the newly formed Joint Senate Task Force on Heroin and Opioid Addiction, holding statewide forums which led to passage of prevention, treatment, and enforcement legislation, along with providing millions of dollars in funding to combat the opioid crisis in New York State.

As a Member of the state senate Majority, Boyle served as Chairman of the State Senate Committee on Commerce, Economic Development & Small Business and as a Member of the Senate Finance Committee. When the New York State Senate changed Majority party control, he served as the Ranking Republican on the Senate Judiciary Committee.

=== Suffolk OTB & Jake's 58 Casino Hotel ===
After retiring from the state senate in 2022, Boyle was appointed as president and CEO of Suffolk Regional OTB & Jake's 58 Casino Hotel, a public benefit corporation with over 500 employees, and one of the most high-profile businesses in downstate New York. His tenure has seen continued growth in the company while it undergoes a $211 million expansion and renovation of the casino.

As a Long Island business leader, Boyle serves on the board of directors of the Long Island Association (LIA) and the HIA-LI. He also serves on the board of the United Veterans Beacon House, a not-for-profit which provides housing for homeless veterans.

New York State Assembly
| Preceded by John Cochrane | Member of the New York State Assembly from the 8th district 1994–2002 | Succeeded by Thomas Barraga |
| Preceded by Thomas Barraga | Member of the New York State Assembly from the 8th district 2006–2013 | Succeeded by Michael J. Fitzpatrick |
New York State Senate
| Preceded by Owen H. Johnson | Member of the New York State Senate from the 4th district 2013–2022 | Succeeded by Monica Martinez |
