= New York's 3rd State Senate district =

American legislative district

Senator
Dean Murray; R–East Patchogue
- Registration: 35.8% Democratic; 29.9% Republican; 26.8% No party preference
- Demographics: 60% White; 9% Black; 27% Hispanic; 3% Asian
- Population (2017): 315,802
- Registered voters: 197,679

New York's 3rd State Senate district is one of 63 districts of the New York State Senate. It has been represented by Republican L. Dean Murray since 2023. For the 2022 election, the 3rd district was redistricted from the old 4th district.

== Geography ==
District 3 covers much of south-central Suffolk County on Long Island, including portions of Brookhaven and Islip. Most of Brentwood, the largest census-designated place on Long Island, is located within the district.

The district overlaps with New York's 1st and 2nd congressional districts, and with the 1st, 2nd, 3rd, 5th, 6th, 7th, and 8th districts of the New York State Assembly.

== Recent election results ==
=== 2026 ===
2026 New York State Senate election, District 3
Party	Candidate	Votes	%
Republican	Dean Murray		
Conservative	Dean Murray		
Total	Dean Murray (incumbent)		
Democratic	Antonio Vargas-Ayala		
Write-in			
Total votes			

=== 2024 ===
2024 New York State Senate election, District 3
Party	Candidate	Votes	%
Republican	Dean Murray	78,923	
Conservative	Dean Murray	10,345	
Total	Dean Murray (incumbent)	89,268	61.5
Democratic	Michael Conroy	55,904	38.5
Write-in		56	0.0
Total votes		145,228	100.0
Republican hold			

=== 2022 ===
2022 New York State Senate election, District 3
Party	Candidate	Votes	%
Republican	Dean Murray	61,459	
Conservative	Dean Murray	9,727	
Total	Dean Murray	71,186	65.1
Democratic	Farzeen Bham	38,129	34.9
Write-in		20	0.0
Total votes		109,335	100.0
Republican win (new boundaries)			

=== 2020 ===
2020 New York State Senate election, District 3
Party	Candidate	Votes	%
Republican	Alexis Weik	60,171	
Conservative	Alexis Weik	8,192	
Total	Alexis Weik	68,363	51.9
Democratic	Monica Martinez	61,596	
Independence	Monica Martinez	1,690	
Total	Monica Martinez (incumbent)	63,286	48.1
Write-in		35	0.0
Total votes		131,684	100.0
Republican gain from Democratic			

=== 2018 ===
2018 New York State Senate election, District 3
Party	Candidate	Votes	%
Democratic	Monica Martinez	46,967	
Working Families	Monica Martinez	1,428	
Women's Equality	Monica Martinez	765	
Total	Monica Martinez	49,160	51.6
Republican	Dean Murray	40,195	
Conservative	Dean Murray	4,798	
Independence	Dean Murray	960	
Reform	Dean Murray	211	
Total	Dean Murray	46,164	48.4
Write-in		13	0.0
Total votes		95,337	100.0
Democratic gain from Republican			

=== 2016 ===
2016 New York State Senate election, District 3
Primary election
Party	Candidate	Votes	%
Democratic	John DeVito Jr.	1,390	42.1
Democratic	Joseph Fritz	1,012	30.7
Democratic	Ricardo Montano	898	27.2
Write-in		0	0.0
Total votes		3,300	100.0
General election
Republican	Thomas Croci	54,727	
Conservative	Thomas Croci	8,107	
Independence	Thomas Croci	2,462	
Reform	Thomas Croci	417	
Total	Thomas Croci (incumbent)	65,713	58.0
Democratic	John DeVito Jr.	43,764	
Working Families	John DeVito Jr.	2,344	
Total	John DeVito Jr.	46,108	40.7
Women's Equality	Joseph Fritz	1,363	1.2
Write-in		97	0.1
Total votes		113,281	100.0
Republican hold			

=== 2014 ===
2014 New York State Senate election, District 3
Primary election
Party	Candidate	Votes	%
Green	Adrienne Esposito	16	84.1
Green	John Miller	1	5.3
Green	Inanimate Carbon Rod	1	5.3
Green	John Walsh	1	5.3
Write-in		0	0.0
Total votes		19	100.0
General election
Republican	Thomas Croci	26,404	
Conservative	Thomas Croci	5,681	
Independence	Thomas Croci	1,776	
Total	Thomas Croci	33,861	58.3
Democratic	Adrienne Esposito	21,213	
Working Families	Adrienne Esposito	2,035	
Green	Adrienne Esposito	952	
Total	Adrienne Esposito	24,200	41.7
Write-in		21	0.0
Total votes		58,082	100.0
Republican hold			

=== 2012 ===
2012 New York State Senate election, District 3
Party	Candidate	Votes	%
Republican	Lee Zeldin	40,908	
Conservative	Lee Zeldin	8,119	
Independence	Lee Zeldin	3,030	
Total	Lee Zeldin (incumbent)	52,057	55.8
Democratic	Francis Genco	41,372	44.2
Write-in		42	0.0
Total votes		93,471	100.0
Republican hold			

=== Federal results in District 3 ===
Year	Office	Results
2020	President	Trump 49.52 – 49.08%
2018	Senate	Gillibrand 55.3– 44.6%
2016	President	Trump 51.3 – 45.3%
2012	President	Obama 55.4 – 43.4%
2012	Senate	Gillibrand 66.7 – 32.1%
