= Thomas Croci =

American politician (born 1972)

Thomas D. Croci
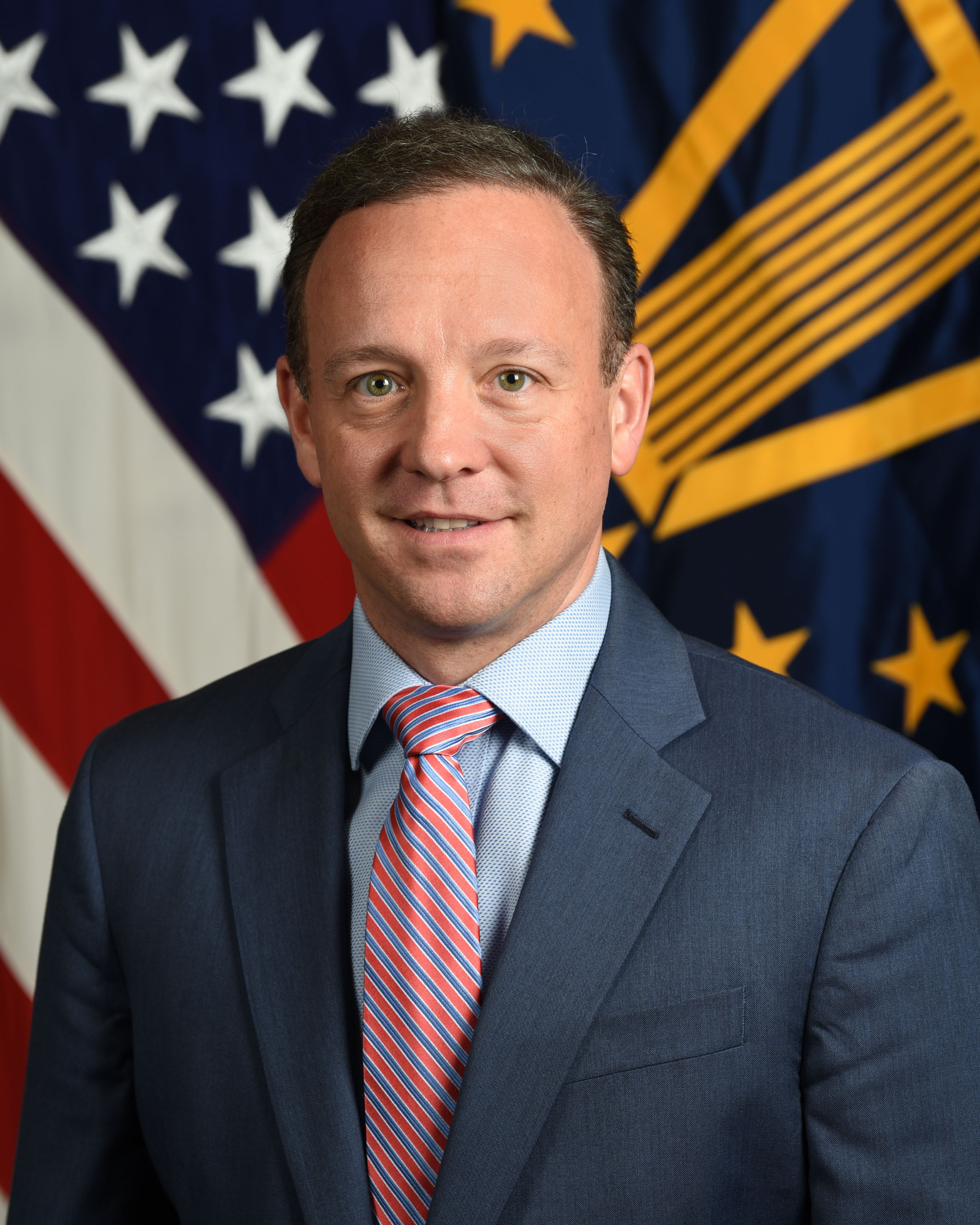
- Official portrait, 2020

Deputy Assistant Secretary of Defense for Afghanistan, Pakistan, and Central Asia
- In office February 3, 2020 – January 19, 2021
- President: Donald Trump
- Preceded by: David Samuel Sedney
- Succeeded by: Rebecca Zimmerman

Member of the New York Senate from the 3rd district
- In office January 1, 2015 – December 31, 2018
- Preceded by: Lee Zeldin
- Succeeded by: Monica Martinez

Town supervisor of Islip, New York
- In office January 1, 2012 – December 31, 2014
- Preceded by: Phil Nolan
- Succeeded by: Angie Carpenter

Personal details
- Born: Thomas Dominick Croci; May 21, 1972 (age 54) Bohemia, New York
- Party: Republican
- Education: James Madison University (BS); New York Law School (JD)
- Website: Official Site

Thomas Dominick Croci (born May 21, 1972) is an American politician and naval officer from the state of New York. A Republican, Croci represented the 3rd District of the New York State Senate from 2015 through 2018. He served as Deputy Assistant Secretary of Defense for Afghanistan, Pakistan, and Central Asia in the Trump administration, from February 3, 2020 to January 19, 2021.

He was elected to his first political office, town supervisor for the Town of Islip, in 2011. Croci was first elected to the State Senate in 2014.

== Early life and education ==
Croci was born on May 21, 1972 in Bohemia, New York.

He graduated from Connetquot High School and received a bachelor's degree from James Madison University in Harrisonburg, Virginia where he earned a Bachelor of Science degree in Political Science.

He graduated from New York Law School in 1997 and then joined the U.S. Navy, where he went to Officer Candidate School in Pensacola, Florida.

== Career ==
He spent eight years on active duty and attained the rank of commander in 2013. He served in Afghanistan and was on the staff of the Homeland Security Council under President George W. Bush and also served on the Barack Obama presidential transition team. Before joining the Homeland Security Council staff, he worked in the White House Situation Room. Croci thereafter returned to active duty as an intelligence officer in Afghanistan, sixteen months into his first term as town supervisor for Islip, New York; he returned to Islip in 2014.

Croci was elected Islip town supervisor in 2011, narrowly defeating the Democratic incumbent, Phil Nolan. As supervisor he clashed with the Republican town board and the town's Republican leader, Frank Tantone, over taxes and appointments. While he was deployed, soil contaminated with carcinogens was found in March 2014 at Roberto Clemente Park in Brentwood, the site of illegal dumping. After returning in July 2014, he apologized on behalf of the town, criticized town employees for allowing the dumping, and ordered the parks and planning departments to draw up a cleanup plan. In December 2014, six people, including former town parks officials, were charged over the dumping.

Croci was formerly an aide to Republican state Senator Lee Zeldin. Croci was elected to New York State Senate for the 3rd district in November 2014, and was elected to a second term. Croci abruptly left the state Senate to rejoin the U.S. Navy in May 2018 without resigning his seat. According to Newsday, Croci's absence threw "a monkey wrench into the day-to-day operations of the State Senate" by depriving Senate Republicans of a governing majority. Croci did not seek re-election in November 2018.

Croci resides in Sayville, New York.

New York State Senate
| Preceded by Lee Zeldin | New York State Senate; 3rd district 2015–2018 | Succeeded by Monica Martinez |
| Preceded by Andrew Lanza | New York State Senate; Chairman of the Committee on Ethics; 2015-2018 | Succeeded by Alessandra Biaggi |
