= Alexis Weik =

American politician

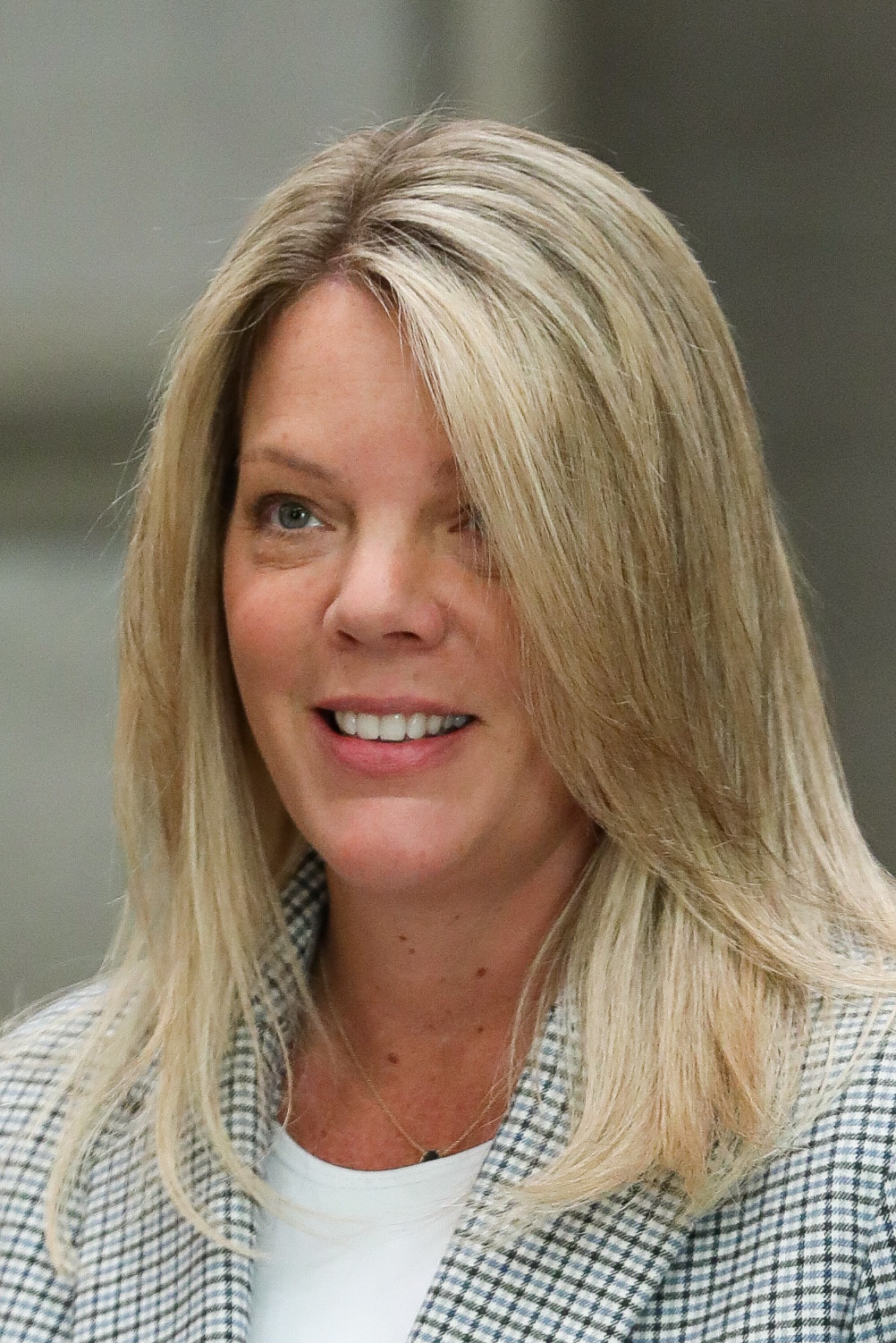
- Weik in 2021

Member of the New York Senate from the 8th district
- Incumbent
- Assumed office January 1, 2021
- Preceded by: Monica Martinez
- Constituency: 3rd district (2021–2022); 8th district (2023–present)

Town of Islip Receiver of Taxes
- In office 2012–2020

Personal details
- Born: September 17, 1972 (age 54) Ronkonkoma, New York, U.S.
- Party: Republican
- Children: 3
- Education: Dowling College (BBA)

Alexis Weik (born September 17, 1972) is an American politician, civil servant, and businesswoman who has represented the 3rd district in the New York State Senate since 2021. A Republican, Weik had previously served as receiver of taxes for the Town of Islip from 2012 until 2020.

== Personal life ==
Weik was raised in both Ronkonkoma, New York and nearby Oakdale on Long Island. She attended Connetquot High School in Bohemia, New York, and later received a Bachelor of Business Administration from Dowling College. She is married and has three children; both her husband and eldest son are police officers. The family resides in Sayville, New York.

Prior to beginning her career in politics, Weik owned a small business in the landscaping industry, and additionally is a certified personal trainer.

== Career ==
=== Receiver of Taxes ===
Alexis Weik has been elected to three terms as the Town of Islip's Receiver of Taxes.

=== New York State Senate ===
In 2020, Alexis Weik was nominated by the Republican Party to run for New York State Senate against incumbent Monica Martinez. Weik won the election with 52% of the vote to Martinez's 48%, a margin of 4%.
