= Monica Martinez =

Salvadoran-American politician (born 1977)

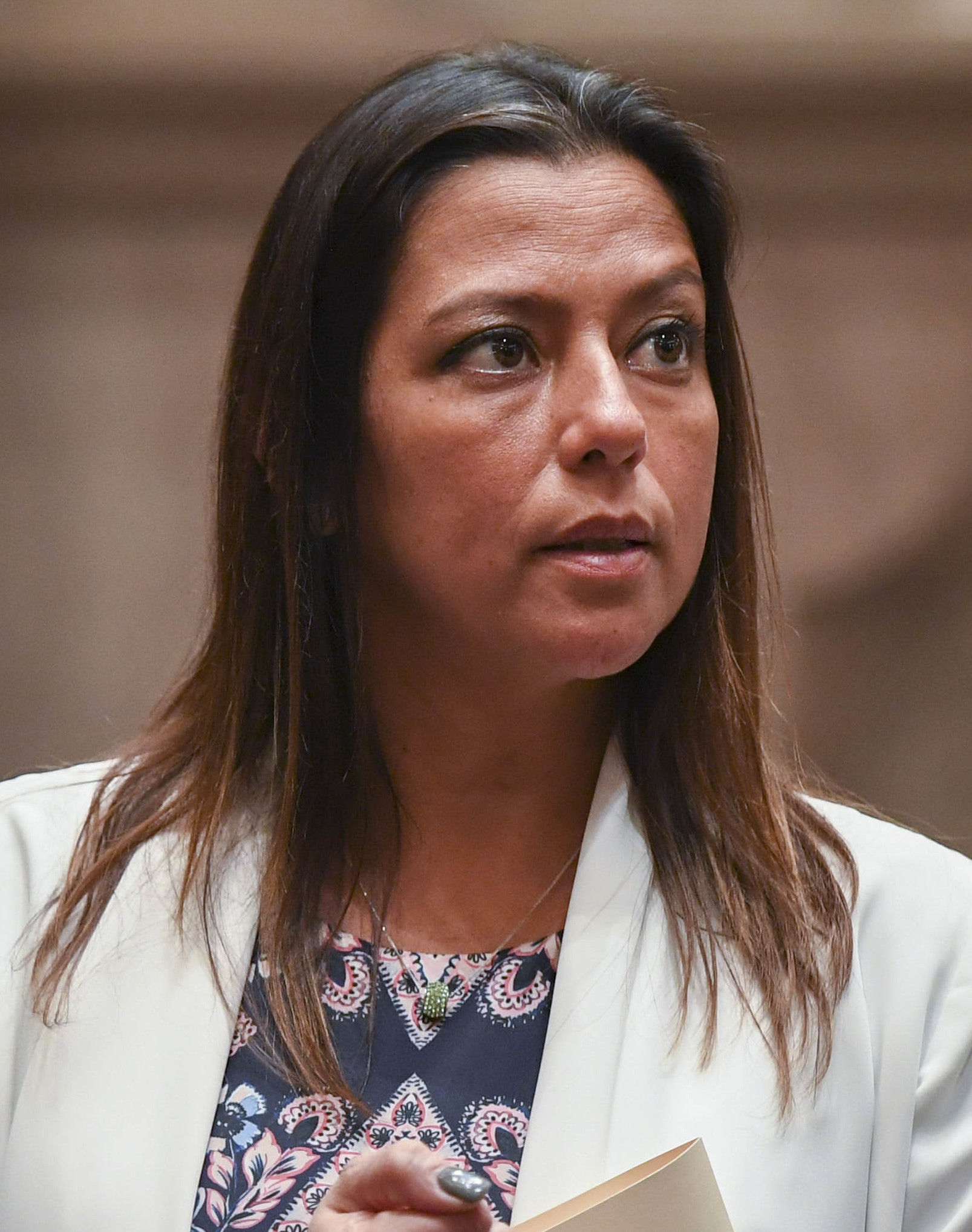

Member of the New York Senate from the 4th district
- Incumbent
- Assumed office January 1, 2023
- Preceded by: New seat (redistricting)
- Constituency: 4th district
- In office January 1, 2019 – December 31, 2020
- Preceded by: Thomas Croci
- Succeeded by: Alexis Weik
- Constituency: 3rd district

Member of the Suffolk County Legislature from the 9th district
- In office January 2, 2014 – December 31, 2018
- Preceded by: Ricardo Montano
- Succeeded by: Samuel Gonzalez

Personal details
- Born: August 13, 1977 (age 49) El Salvador
- Party: Democratic
- Education: Stony Brook University; New York University; Binghamton University
- Profession: Educator
- Website: Official website

Monica R. Martinez (born August 13, 1977) is a Salvadoran-American, civil servant, educator and politician from the state of New York. A Democrat, she is a member of the New York State Senate representing the 4th district. Martinez has also served in the Suffolk County Legislature, representing the 9th district. She is a former Assistant Principal at East Middle School in Brentwood, NY.

== Early life and career ==
Martinez was born in El Salvador and moved to the United States at the age of 3. She received her bachelor's degree from Binghamton University, and subsequently a masters and administrative degree from New York University and Stony Brook University respectively. Martinez worked as a social studies teacher at Brentwood High School for 10 years before becoming the assistant principal of Brentwood's East Middle School.

In 2013, Martinez defeated incumbent Suffolk County Legislator Ricardo Montano in the Democratic primary and was subsequently elected to represent Suffolk County's 9th Legislative District. As a legislator, Martinez was known for taking legislative action on the issues of woman's equality and animal rights. Martinez was appointed chairwoman to the Public Safety Committee and pledged to help eradicate the Long Island gang violence epidemic through collaboration with local law enforcement officials.

Martinez resides in Brentwood, New York. She is the younger sister of the Town of Babylon, New York, councilman Antonio Martinez.

== New York State Senate ==
On June 5, 2018, Martinez announced her intention to seek the New York State Senate seat being vacated by Thomas Croci. On November 6, 2018, Martinez defeated Assemblyman Dean Murray by more than 2,500 votes.

Martinez was named chair for the Committee on Domestic Animal Welfare.

Martinez opposed the Driver's License Access and Privacy Act, a law that authorized undocumented immigrants to obtain New York driver licenses. Of all Senators voting against the bill, Senator Martinez faced the most criticism; she changed her position on the issue after becoming a New York State Senator. Martinez faced protest and has been accused of flip-flopping on the issue and of betraying her own community of origin. In 2025, Make The Road New York hosted a protest in front of Martinez's district office in Hauppauge, New York, after she opposed New York for All, a proposed bill that would force state agencies to end any co-operation with Immigration and Customs Enforcement.

Bills introduced by Martinez that were signed into law include:

- S1719C in the 2019-2020 session, criminalizing revenge porn
- S3852A in the 2019-2020 session, also known as "Shannon's Law", expanding coverage for mammograms under health insurance
- S8138 in the 2019-2020 session, a bill to allow municipalities to defer tax payments during a state of emergency, such as the COVID-19 pandemic occurring at the time.

In November 2020, Martinez lost her re-election bid to Republican Alexis Weik. On February 14, 2022, Martinez announced her candidacy to once again represent New York's 3rd Senate District in the 2022 general election. Due to redistricting, Martinez later switched to run in the newly drawn 4th Senate District. She was elected on November 8, 2022, defeating businesswoman Wendy Rodriguez with 49.18% of the vote to Rodriguez's 46.85%.
