= Ricardo Montano =

American politician (born 1950)

Rick (Ricardo) Montano
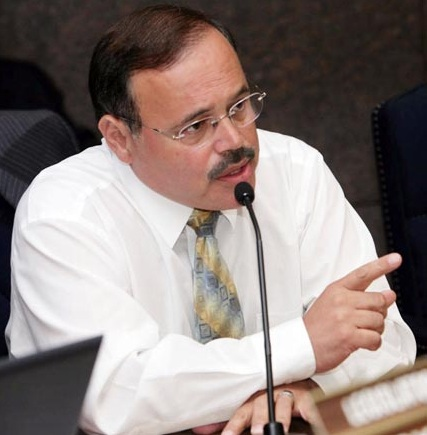

Member of the Suffolk County Legislature from the 9th District
- Incumbent
- Assumed office January 2004
- Preceded by: None

Personal details
- Born: July 1, 1950 (age 75) Bronx, New York
- Party: Democratic
- Education: City College of New York (BA); Temple Law School (JD)
- Profession: Lawyer
- Website: Suffolk County Legislature

Rick (Ricardo) Montano (born July 1, 1950) is a former Suffolk County Legislator from the 9th District, which includes the Town of Islip in west-central Suffolk County. He is a member of the Democratic Party, and the son of former Assemblyman, Armando Montano.

== Personal life ==
Rick Montano was born in the Bronx, New York City, and attended New York City public schools. He moved to Long Island in 1963 where he attended Brentwood High School but returned to New York City, where he graduated from DeWitt Clinton High School in 1968.

Montano graduated from the City College of New York in 1972 with a bachelor's degree in Political Science. Upon graduation, he received a full tuition scholarship to attend Temple Law School in Philadelphia where he earned his Juris Doctor degree in 1975.

Subsequently, he was appointed as an Assistant District Attorney in the City of Philadelphia. Thereafter, Montano returned to New York City and became the Deputy Director of the Institute of Puerto Rican Urban Studies in the Bronx, a housing development program that promoted rehabilitation and new construction.

Montano returned to the practice of law in Philadelphia and was appointed Senior Trial Attorney with the United States Equal Employment Opportunity Commission in 1979. In this position, Montano represented the United States Government in federal civil rights employment cases. In 1981, Montano was appointed Executive Director of the Suffolk County Human Rights Commission, where he served for eight years. He then formed the law firm of Montano & Calisto, and also served as legal counsel to New York State Senator Larry Seabrook of the Bronx.

== Political career ==
In 1999, Montano was appointed Assistant Attorney General for the State of New York in the Suffolk Regional Office. In November 2003, he was elected Suffolk County Legislator from the 9th District. Rick has run unopposed, and has been reelected, four times to the Suffolk County Legislature.

In his former position, Legislator Montano represented Brentwood, Central Islip, and parts of Islandia. Legislator Montano served as the Chairperson of the Ways and Means Committee, Vice Chairperson of the Parks and Recreation Committee, and a member of the Veterans and Seniors Committee.

In September and November 2013, Montano was defeated by Monica Martinez.

=== New York State Senate Race 2012 ===
On July 10, 2012, Montano surprised many when he filed petitions with 2,567 signatures with the Suffolk Board of Elections in what was to prove an unsuccessful bid win a NY State Senate seat held by incumbent Republican State Senator Owen Johnson. Senator Johnson, after 40 years in office announced that he would be retiring and Assemblyman Phil Boyle won the Republican, Independence and Conservative Party nominations as well as the lion's share of endorsements from labor, environmental groups and law enforcement. Montano lost the election by approximately 6000 votes.

==== Sex Offender Vote Controversy ====
On November 16, 2010 the Suffolk County Legislature voted to authorize a vendor to house homeless sex offenders in secret locations around the County. Resolution 1189 passed the legislature with Ricardo Montano's vote in favor and was ultimately vetoed by County Executive Steve Levy. The controversial issue was extended when Legislator Montano voted to override the Executive veto. The votes have become a central issue in Legislator Montano's attempt to win a seat in the New York State Senate. Newsday has covered the issue extensively.

==== Newsday Endorsement ====
On October 19, 2012, Newsday published its endorsements for New York State Senate. Out of the nine State Senators that represent Long Island, Rick Montano was the only Democrat endorsed by Newsday. The article further emphasized the importance of this endorsement by stating, "This is the marquee State Senate race". The Newsday editorial board judged the two candidates' positions on supporting the DREAM Act, lowering property taxes, and reducing unfunded state mandates to be similar. The candidates do differ, however, on several key issues. Rick Montano supports equal pay for women, as well as increasing the minimum wage, maintaining school funding, and protecting the local environment. Toward the end of the endorsement, Newsday concluded, "What's appealing about Montano is his high level of independence, his intelligence, his long resume in civil rights jobs at the federal and county level, plus service with the state attorney general."

==== Vote on MTA Payroll Tax ====
On September 16, 2010, The Suffolk County Legislature held a vote on a resolution (I.R. 1875) - Directing the County Attorney to bring an action against New York State regarding the MTA payroll tax. The resolution passed with strong bipartisan support with 17 votes in favor and a single vote to oppose, which was cast by Legislator Monatano. The lawsuit ultimately succeeded when Justice R. Bruce Cozzens ruled in favor of the County by declaring the New York City MTA's $1.2 payroll tax unconstitutional.

== See also ==
- List of Members of the Suffolk County Legislature
