= New York State Senate =

Upper house of the New York State Legislature

- New York State Legislature

Type
- Type: Upper house

Leadership
- President: Antonio Delgado (D) since May 25, 2022
- Temporary President and Majority Leader: Andrea Stewart-Cousins (D) since January 9, 2019
- Minority Leader: Rob Ortt (R) since June 28, 2020

Structure
- Seats: 63
- Political groups: Majority: Democratic (41); Minority: Republican (22)
- Length of term: 2 years
- Authority: Article III, New York Constitution
- Salary: $142,000/year + per diem

Elections
- Last election: November 5, 2024
- Next election: November 3, 2026
- Redistricting: Legislative Control

Meeting place
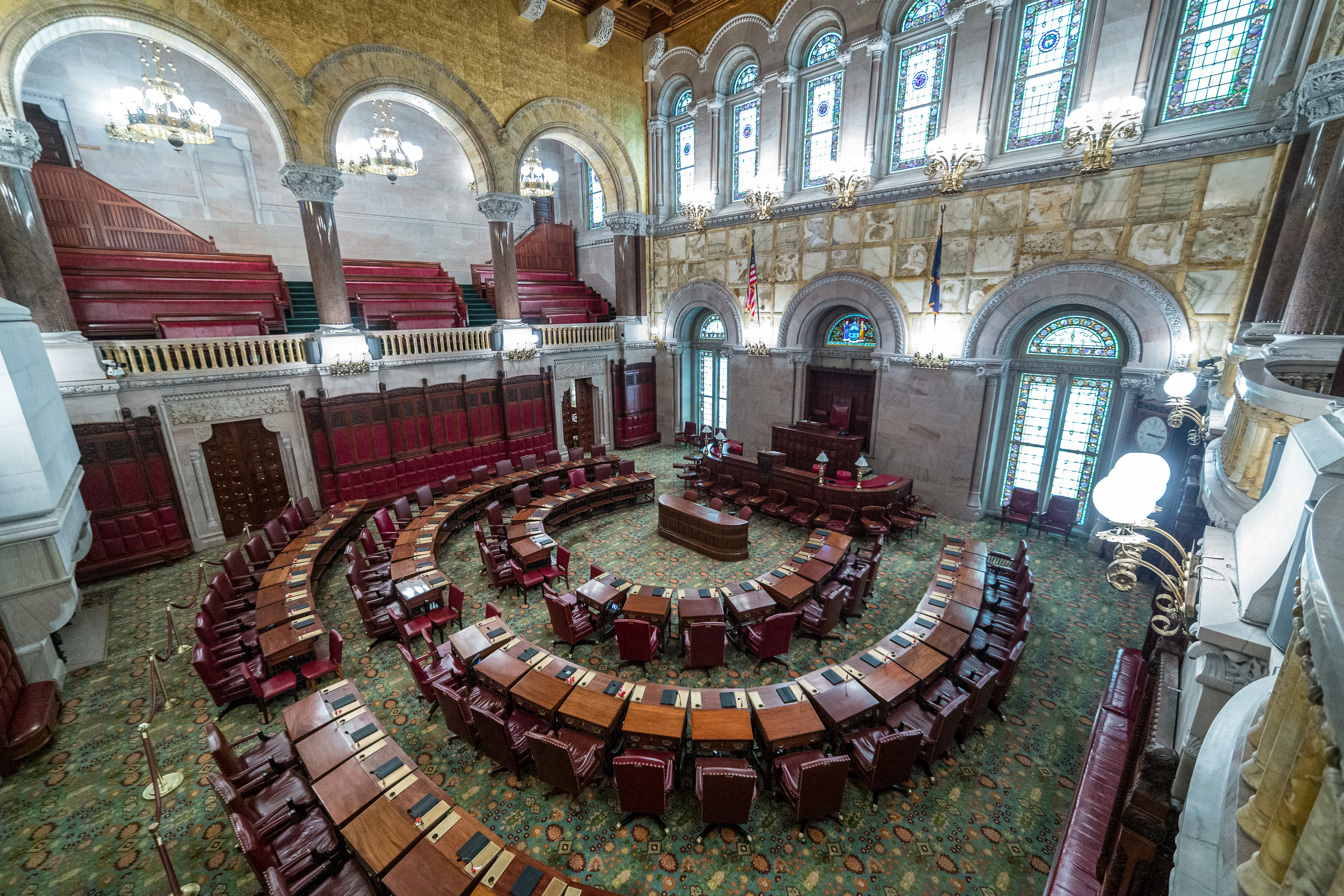
- Senate chamber within the New York State Capitol in Albany, New York.

Website
- nysenate.gov

The New York State Senate is the upper house of the New York State Legislature, while the New York State Assembly is its lower house. Established in 1777 by the Constitution of New York, its members are elected to two-year terms with no term limits. There are 63 seats in the Senate. The Democratic Party has held control of the New York State Senate since 2019. The Senate majority leader is Andrea Stewart-Cousins.

== Recent history ==
The New York State Senate was dominated by the Republican Party for much of the 20th century. Between World War II and the turn of the 21st century, the Democratic Party only controlled the upper house for one year.

=== 2006–2008 ===
In the 2006 elections, Republicans maintained control of the State Senate, but lost the seat of Republican Nicholas Spano in Westchester County.

Entering 2007, Republican control of the Senate seemed precarious. The Senate Republican caucus was diminished to 33 members. In a February 2007 special election, the open Senate vacated by Michael Balboni in Nassau County was lost to Democrat Craig M. Johnson.

As of 2008, the State Senate had been controlled by the Republican Party since 1965.

In February 2008, Democrat Darrel Aubertine won a special election in the majority-Republican 48th District in Watertown. This loss diminished the Republican Senate majority to a single seat.

On July 18, 2008, Senate Majority Leader Joseph Bruno resigned from the Senate.

=== 2009–2010: Democrats control Senate; "parliamentary coup" occurs ===
Democrats won 32 of 62 seats in New York's upper chamber in the 2008 general election on November 4, capturing the Senate majority for the first time in more than four decades.

However, a power struggle emerged before the new term began. Four Democratic senators — Rubén Díaz Sr. (Bronx), Carl Kruger (Brooklyn), Pedro Espada Jr. (Bronx), and Hiram Monserrate (Queens) — immediately refused to caucus with their party. The self-named "Gang of Four" refused to back Malcolm Smith (Queens) as the chamber's majority leader and sought concessions. Monserrate soon rejoined the caucus after reaching an agreement with Smith that reportedly included the chairmanship of the Consumer Affairs Committee. The remaining "Gang of Three" reached an initial compromise in early December that collapsed within a week, but was ultimately resolved with Smith becoming majority leader.

At the beginning of the 2009–2010 legislative session, there were 32 Democrats and 30 Republicans in the Senate. On June 8, 2009, then-Senators Hiram Monserrate and Pedro Espada Jr.—both Democrats—voted with the 30 Republican members to install Senate Republican Leader Dean Skelos (R-Rockville Centre) as the new majority leader of the Senate, replacing Democratic Senate Majority Leader Malcolm Smith. The Associated Press described the vote as a "parliamentary coup". The move came after Republican whip Tom Libous introduced a surprise resolution to vacate the chair and replace Smith as temporary president and majority leader. In an effort to stop the vote, Democratic whip Jeff Klein (Bronx) unilaterally moved to recess, and Smith had the lights and Internet cut off; however, they were unable to prevent the vote from being held. In accordance with a prearranged deal, Espada was elected temporary president and acting lieutenant governor while Skelos was elected majority leader.

Following the "coup", Senate Democrats voted for John Sampson (D-Brooklyn) to replace Smith as Democratic Leader. On June 14, Monserrate declared that he would once again caucus with the Democrats. This development meant that the Senate was evenly split, 31–31, between the Republican Conference and the Democratic Conference. Due to a vacancy in the office of the Lieutenant Governor, there was no way to break the deadlock.

Between June 8 and the end of the "coup" on July 9, the Senate did not conduct any official business. According to The New York Times, Espada's power play "threw the Senate into turmoil and hobbled the state government, making the body a national laughingstock as the feuding factions shouted and gaveled over each other in simultaneous legislative sessions." The "coup" also led to litigation.

On July 9, 2009, the "coup" ended. Espada rejoined the Senate Democratic Conference after reaching a deal in which he would be named Senate Majority Leader, Sampson would remain Senate Democratic Leader, and Smith would be Temporary President of the Senate during a "transition period" after which Sampson would ascend to the Temporary Presidency. On February 9, 2010, the Senate voted to expel Monserrate from the Senate following a misdemeanor domestic violence conviction. Espada was defeated in a September 2010 primary election in which the Democratic Party backed his challenger, Gustavo Rivera.

=== 2011–2012: Republicans return to power; IDC forms ===
Republicans retook the Senate majority in the 2010 elections, winning 32 seats to the Democrats' 30 on Election Day. One Republican Senate incumbent (Sen. Frank Padavan of Queens) was defeated, while Democratic candidate David Carlucci was elected to an open seat in Senate District 38 that had been vacated due to the death of Republican Senator Thomas Morahan on July 12, 2010. Four Democratic incumbents lost their seats to Republicans in the 2010 elections: Sen. Brian Foley was defeated by Lee Zeldin, Sen. Antoine Thompson was defeated by Mark Grisanti, Sen. Darrel Aubertine was defeated by Patty Ritchie, and Craig M. Johnson was defeated by Jack Martins.

Just before the new legislative session convened in January 2011, four Senate Democrats—led by former Democratic whip Jeff Klein—broke away from the Senate Democratic Conference to form an Independent Democratic Conference (IDC). Klein said that he and his three colleagues—Diane Savino, David Carlucci and David Valesky—could no longer support the leadership of Senate Democratic Leader John Sampson.

In March 2011, "Gang of Four" member Senator Carl Kruger surrendered to bribery charges. He later pleaded guilty to those charges in December 2011. On March 20, 2012, Republican David Storobin defeated Democrat Lew Fidler in a special election to fill Kruger's vacated seat; results of the special election took weeks to finalize.

On June 24, 2011, same-sex marriage legislation passed the Senate by a vote of 33–29. Governor Andrew Cuomo signed it into law at 11:55 P.M.

On March 15, 2012, Cuomo signed redistricting legislation that added a 63rd State Senate district. Months prior to the passage of the redistricting legislation, the New York Daily News reported that according to Republican sources, adding a 63rd seat "to the current 62-member body would...make political coups like the one that shut down the chamber two years ago more difficult". The Daily News added: "Insiders note that adding a 63rd seat in the state Senate would avoid any legislative chaos by ensuring one party would be in the majority – as opposed to now, with an even number of seats". Following a lawsuit, the New York Court of Appeals upheld the enacted redistricting plan on May 3, 2012.

=== 2013–2014: Coalition government ===
In the November 6, 2012 elections, Democrats won a total of 33 seats for a three-seat majority. Democrats gained seats in Senate Districts 17 (where Democrat Simcha Felder defeated Republican incumbent David Storobin), 41, and 55 (where Ted O'Brien defeated Sean Hanna to win the seat vacated by the retiring Republican Sen. Jim Alesi), and won the election in the newly created Senate District 46 (discussed below).

The election in Senate District 46—a new district that was created through the redistricting process in 2012—was noteworthy because the candidate who was sworn in as the victor was later found, following a recount, to have lost the election. Republican George Amedore was sworn in to the State Senate following the election. However, a recount revealed that Democrat Cecilia Tkaczyk had defeated Amedore by 18 votes; therefore, Amedore vacated the seat, becoming the shortest-tenured senator in modern New York history. Amedore would eventually win a rematch with Tkaczyk in 2014.

Of the four Republican state senators who voted for the Marriage Equality Act in 2011 (Sens. Roy McDonald, James Alesi, Mark Grisanti, and Stephen Saland), only Grisanti was re-elected in 2012. The Conservative Party of New York withdrew support for any candidate who had voted for the bill. Sen. Alesi opted to retire instead of facing a potential primary challenge; Sen. McDonald lost a Republican primary to Saratoga County Clerk Kathy Marchione; and Sen. Saland won his Republican primary, but lost the general election to Democrat Terry Gipson after Saland's Republican primary challenger, Neil Di Carlo, remained on the ballot on the Conservative line and acted as a spoiler.

On December 4, 2012, it was announced that Senate Republicans had reached a power-sharing deal with the four-member Independent Democratic Conference (IDC). Under their power-sharing arrangement, the IDC and the Senate Republicans would "jointly decide what bills [would] reach the Senate floor each day of the session", would "dole out committee assignments", would "have the power to make appointments to state and local boards", and would "share negotiations over the state budget". Sens. Klein and Skelos also agreed that the title of Senate President would shift back and forth between the two of them every two weeks. Together, the Senate Republicans and the IDC held enough seats to form a governing majority; that majority was augmented when freshman senator Felder of Brooklyn, a Democrat, joined the Senate Republican Conference. Also, former Senate Majority Leader Malcolm Smith joined the IDC in December 2012.

On December 17, 2012, Senate Democrats elected Andrea Stewart-Cousins as Senate Democratic Leader. Stewart-Cousins became the first woman in history to lead a conference in the New York State Legislature.

Malcolm Smith was expelled from the IDC in April 2013 due to a scandal in which he attempted to bribe the Republican Party chairs in New York City for a Wilson Pakula to run in the upcoming New York City mayoral election.

Former Senate Minority Leader John L. Sampson was expelled from the Senate Democratic Conference on May 6, 2013, following his arrest on embezzlement charges. Sampson later forfeited his Senate seat after being convicted of making false statements to federal agents in relation to the initial embezzlement case.

In February 2014, Tony Avella joined the IDC.

=== 2015–2017: Republicans lead again ===
In June 2014, the IDC announced that it would end its political alliance with the Republicans and create a new one with the Senate Democratic Conference, citing a need "to fight for the core Democratic policies that are left undone." In the 2014 elections, Senate Republicans retook an outright majority in the Senate. The election results meant that Klein lost his position as co-leader, with Skelos taking over as the Senate Majority Leader and Temporary President of the Senate and regaining sole control over which bills would reach the Senate floor. After the election, the IDC reversed course and continued its alliance with the Republicans in the 2015 legislative session.

On May 4, 2015, U.S. Attorney Preet Bharara announced the arrest of Senate Majority Leader Dean Skelos (along with his son, Adam Skelos) and the arrest of Assembly Speaker Sheldon Silver. Within days, Skelos announced that he was stepping down as leader of the Republican Caucus and as Majority Leader. Senator John Flanagan, of Suffolk County, became the new Majority Leader, and the first Majority Leader from Suffolk County.

After Skelos was convicted in December 2015, his seat was declared vacant, with a special election to be held on the presidential primary of 2016. The special election was won by Democrat Todd Kaminsky, resulting in the Democratic Party having a numerical 32–31 advantage over the Republicans in the State Senate. Despite this, both Felder and the members of the IDC chose to remain in coalition with the Republican majority.

Late in 2016, Senator Jesse Hamilton announced his intention to join the IDC if re-elected. The IDC aided Hamilton in his first election in 2014, which had resulted in speculation he would eventually join the conference.

In the 2016 elections, Senate Republicans lost one seat on Long Island and gained an upstate seat in Buffalo. On Long Island, freshman Sen. Michael Venditto was defeated in a close race by Democrat John Brooks. In Buffalo, the open seat vacated by Democratic Sen. Mark Panepinto (who did not seek re-election) was won by Republican Erie County Clerk Chris Jacobs. Felder announced that he would continue to caucus with the GOP, which ensured that the Republicans would retain control of the Senate by a margin of 32–31. Newly elected Democratic Sen. Marisol Alcantara also announced that she would join the IDC.

Liberal groups in New York State, including the Working Families Party, called on Cuomo to intervene and pressure Felder, the IDC, and the Senate Democratic Conference to unite. On January 2, 2017, Senate Majority Leader Flanagan and Senate IDC Leader Klein announced the continuation of their coalition.

In late January 2017, Senator Jose Peralta announced that he was joining the IDC. Peralta's action expanded the IDC to eight members and the Republican-IDC-Felder coalition to 40 members; it also reduced the Senate Democratic Conference to 23 members.

=== 2018: The IDC dissolves ===
On April 4, 2018, the IDC announced that it would dissolve, that its members would rejoin the Senate Democratic Conference, that Stewart-Cousins would continue as Senate Democratic Leader, and that Sen. Klein would become the Deputy Democratic Conference Leader. The announcement followed a meeting called by Cuomo at which he requested that the IDC reunite with the Senate Democratic Conference. On April 16, the IDC was dissolved. After the IDC dissolved, the Senate Democratic Conference contained 29 members, the Senate Republican Conference contained 32 members (including Sen. Felder), and there were two vacant Senate seats.

After two April 24, 2018 special elections were won by Democrats, the Democrats gained a 32–31 numerical Senate majority; however, Felder continued to caucus with the Republicans, allowing them to maintain a 32–31 majority.

In 2018, five Republican senators announced that they would not seek re-election in the fall.

In the September 13, 2018 Democratic primary elections, all eight Democratic senators who had been members of the IDC at the time of its dissolution faced challengers. Six of the challengers prevailed. Another Democratic incumbent, Martin Malave Dilan, was also defeated by a primary challenger (Julia Salazar, a self-described democratic socialist).

=== 2019–present: Democratic majority ===
In the 2018 elections, Democrats gained eight Senate seats, taking control of the chamber from the Republicans. In total, enrolled Democrats won 40 of the chamber's 63 seats, while Republicans won 23. Felder offered to rejoin the Democratic Conference, but was turned down in December 2018. Andrea Stewart-Cousins was formally elected Majority Leader and Temporary President on January 9, 2019, becoming the first woman to hold the post.

In July 2019, Felder was accepted into the Senate Democratic Conference; this action gave the Conference a total of 40 members.

In anticipation of Minority Leader Flanagan's resignation on June 28, Sen. Rob Ortt was named the leader of the Senate Republican Conference.

In the 2020 elections, Democrats won a total of 43 seats, while Republicans won 20; the election results gave Senate Democrats a veto-proof two-thirds supermajority.

As of February 10, 2026, the Democratic Party holds 41 seats in the Senate and the Republican Party holds 22 seats.

In line with the 'blue tsunami' 2026 wave election, Democrats flipped 6 Senate seats from Republican control.

== Partisan composition ==
As of February 10, 2026, the Democratic Party holds 41 seats in the Senate and the Republican Party holds 22 seats.

| Affiliation | Recent party affiliation history (Shading indicates majority caucus) | | | | | Total | Vacant |
| Affiliation | Democratic | | | | Republican | Total | Vacant |
| Affiliation | SDC (Note: "SDC" stands for "Senate Democratic Conference".) | | IDC (Note: "IDC" stands for "Independent Democratic Conference".) | SF (Note: "SF" stands for "Simcha Felder". Felder is an enrolled Democrat. From the beginning of his Senate tenure (in 2013) until 2019, he caucused with Senate Republicans. In early 2019, he did not caucus with either party. In July 2019, he joined the Senate Democratic Conference.) | Republican | Total | Vacant |
|---|---|---|---|---|---|---|---|
| Begin 2007 session | 29 | | | | 33 | 62 | 0 |
| End 2008 session | 30 | | | | 31 | 61 | 1 |
| Begin 2009 session | 32 | | | | 30 | 62 | 0 |
| End 2010 session | 32 | | | | 29 | 61 | 1 |
| Begin 2011 session | 26 | | 4 | | 32 | 62 | 0 |
| End 2012 session | 25 | | 4 | | 33 | 62 | 0 |
| Begin 2013 session | 27 | | 5 | 1 | 30 | 63 | 0 |
| End 2014 session | 24 | 2 (Note: As per the additional sources listed below this infobox, two Democratic senators--Malcolm Smith and John Sampson--were expelled from their respective conferences during the 2013-2014 session.) | 5 | 1 | 29 | 61 | 2 |
| Begin 2015 session | 25 | 1 (Note: Democrat John Sampson was not a member of a legislative conference in 2015; he was expelled from the Senate Democratic Conference in 2014.) | 5 | 1 | 32 | 63 | 0 |
| End 2016 session | 25 | | 5 | 1 | 31 | 62 | 1 |
| Begin 2017 session | 24 | | 7 | 1 | 31 | 63 | 0 |
| End 2018 session | 31 | | | 1 | 31 | 63 | 0 |
| Begin 2019 session | 39 | | | 1 | 23 | 63 | 0 |
| End 2020 session | 40 | | | | 20 | 60 | 3 |
| 2021–2022 | 43 | | | | 20 | 63 | 0 |
| Begin 2023 Session | 42 | | | | 21 | 63 | 0 |
| End 2024 | 41 | | | | 21 | 62 | 1 |
| Begin 2025 Session | 41 | | | | 22 | 63 | 0 |
| April 10, 2025 (Note: Democratic Sen. Simcha Felder (District 22) resigned after successfully running for New York City Council.) | 40 | | | | 22 | 62 | 1 |
| May 27, 2025 (Note: Democratic Sen. Sam Sutton was sworn in to succeed Felder.) | 41 | | | | 22 | 63 | 0 |
| December 31, 2025 (Note: Democratic Sens. Brad Hoylman-Sigal (District 47) and Sean Ryan (District 61) resigned from the Senate after being elected to other offices.) | 39 | | | | 22 | 61 | 2 |
| February 4, 2026 (Note: Democratic Sens. Erik Bottcher (District 47) and Jeremy Zellner (District 61) were sworn in to succeed Hoylman-Sigal and Ryan.) | 41 | | | | 22 | 63 | 0 |
| August 7, 2026 (Note: Democratic Sen. Michael Gianaris (District 12) resigned from the Senate.) | 40 | | | | 22 | 62 | 1 |
| Latest voting share | 64.5% | | | | 35.5% | | |

Additional sources regarding recent party affiliation history
- 2007:
- 2008:
- 2009:
- 2010:
- 2011:
- 2012:
- 2013:
- 2014:
- 2015:
- 2016:
- 2017:
- 2018:
- 2019:
- 2020:

== Officers ==
The Lieutenant Governor of New York has a casting vote in the event of a tie vote in the Senate; however, there is debate over the meaning of the term "casting vote".

The Senate has one additional officer outside those who are elected by the people. The Secretary of the Senate is a post that is chosen by a majority vote of the senators, and does not have voting power (the Secretary is allowed, though officially discouraged, from discussing and negotiating legislative matters). The Secretary of the Senate is responsible for administering the Senate's office space, overseeing the handling of bills and the oversight of the sergeants-at-arms and the stenographer. Alejandra Paulino was appointed to the position in December 2018.

New York State Senate officers
| Position | Name | Party | District |
|---|---|---|---|
| President of the Senate/Lieutenant Governor | Antonio Delgado | Democratic | —N/a |
| Temporary President/Majority Leader | Andrea Stewart-Cousins | Democratic | 35 |
| Deputy Majority Leader | —N/a | Democratic | —N/a |
| Vice President Pro Tempore | Toby Ann Stavisky | Democratic | 11 |
| Senior Assistant Majority Leader | Kevin Parker | Democratic | 21 |
| Majority Conference Chair | José M. Serrano | Democratic | 29 |
| Majority Conference Vice-Chair | John Liu | Democratic | 16 |
| Majority Conference Secretary | Roxanne Persaud | Democratic | 19 |
| Assistant Majority Leader on Conference Operations | Gustavo Rivera | Democratic | 33 |
| Assistant Majority Leader on House Operations | Jamaal Bailey | Democratic | 36 |
| Majority Whip | Leroy Comrie | Democratic | 14 |
| Majority Deputy Whip | Joseph Addabbo Jr. | Democratic | 15 |
| Majority Assistant Whip | Shelley Mayer | Democratic | 37 |
| Liaison to the Executive Branch | Monica Martinez | Democratic | 4 |
| Deputy Majority Leader for State Federal Relations | James Skoufis | Democratic | 42 |
| Deputy Majority Leader for Senate and Assembly Relations | Julia Salazar | Democratic | 18 |
| Chair of the Majority Steering Committee | Rachel May | Democratic | 48 |
| Minority Leader | Rob Ortt | Republican | 62 |
| Deputy Minority Leader and Floor Leader | Andrew Lanza | Republican | 24 |
| Minority Conference Chair | Pamela Helming | Republican | 54 |
| Minority Conference Vice-Chair | Patricia Canzoneri-Fitzpatrick | Republican | 9 |
| Minority Conference Secretary | Alexis Weik | Republican | 8 |
| Assistant Minority Leader | Joseph A. Griffo | Republican | 53 |
| Minority Deputy Floor Leader | Anthony Palumbo | Republican | 1 |
| Minority Whip | Patrick M. Gallivan | Republican | 60 |

== Committees ==
New York State Senate Committees for the 248th Legislative Session (2025–2026)
| Committee | Chair | Ranking Member |
|---|---|---|
| Aging | Cordell Cleare | Jacob Ashby |
| Agriculture | Michelle Hinchey | George M. Borrello |
| Alcoholism and Substance Abuse Disorders | Nathalia Fernandez | Peter Oberacker |
| Banks | James Sanders Jr. | George M. Borrello |
| Budget and Revenue | Andrew Gounardes | Bill Weber |
| Children and Families | Jabari Brisport | Robert Rolison |
| Cities 1 | Erik Bottcher | Stephen T. Chan |
| Cities 2 | Christopher J. Ryan | Mark Walczyk |
| Civil Service and Pensions | Robert Jackson | Alexis Weik |
| Codes | Zellnor Myrie | Anthony H. Palumbo |
| Commerce, Economic Development and Small Business | April Baskin | Dean Murray |
| Consumer Protection | Rachel May | Patricia Canzoneri-Fitzpatrick |
| Corporations, Authorities, and Commissions | Leroy Comrie | Mario R. Mattera |
| Crime Victims, Crime and Correction | Julia Salazar | Robert Rolison |
| Cultural Affairs, Tourism, Parks, and Recreation | José M. Serrano | James Tedisco |
| Disabilities | Patricia Fahy | Bill Weber |
| Education | Shelley Mayer | James Tedisco |
| Elections | Kristen Gonzalez | Mark Walczyk |
| Energy and Telecommunications | Kevin S. Parker | Mario R. Mattera |
| Environmental Conservation | Peter Harckham | Daniel G. Stec |
| Ethics and Internal Governance | Shelley Mayer | Steven D. Rhoads |
| Finance | Liz Krueger | Thomas F. O'Mara |
| Health | Gustavo Rivera | Patrick M. Gallivan |
| Higher Education | Toby Ann Stavisky | Joseph A. Griffo |
| Housing, Construction, and Community Development | Brian P. Kavanagh | Jack M. Martins |
| Insurance | Jamaal T. Bailey | Pamela Helming |
| Internet and Technology | Kristen Gonzalez | Daniel G. Stec |
| Investigations and Government Operations | James Skoufis | Thomas F. O'Mara |
| Judiciary | Luis R. Sepúlveda | Anthony H. Palumbo |
| Labor | Jessica Ramos | Steven D. Rhoads |
| Libraries | Siela A. Bynoe | Dean Murray |
| Local Government | Monica R. Martinez | Alexis Weik |
| Mental Health | Samra G. Brouk | Patricia Canzoneri-Fitzpatrick |
| New York City Education | John C. Liu | Stephen T. Chan |
| Procurement and Contracts | Jeremy J. Zellner | Jack M. Martins |
| Racing, Gaming and Wagering | Joseph P. Addabbo Jr. | James Tedisco |
| Rules | Andrea Stewart-Cousins | Robert G. Ortt |
| Social Services | Roxanne J. Persaud | Dean Murray |
| Transportation | Jeremy Cooney | Peter Oberacker |
| Veterans, Homeland Security, and Military Affairs | Jessica Scarcella-Spanton | Jacob Ashby |
| Women's Issues | Lea Webb | Alexis Weik |

== Current members ==
| District | Name | Party | Start | Counties | Residence |
|---|---|---|---|---|---|
| 1 | Anthony Palumbo | Republican | 2020 | Suffolk | New Suffolk |
| 2 | Mario Mattera | Republican | 2020 | Suffolk | St. James |
| 3 | Dean Murray | Republican | 2022 | Suffolk | East Patchogue |
| 4 | Monica Martinez | Democratic | 2022 | Suffolk | Brentwood |
| 5 | Steven Rhoads | Republican | 2022 | Nassau | Bellmore |
| 6 | Siela Bynoe | Democratic | 2024 | Nassau | Westbury |
| 7 | Jack Martins | Republican | 2022 | Nassau | Great Neck |
| 8 | Alexis Weik | Republican | 2020 | Nassau, Suffolk | Sayville |
| 9 | Patricia Canzoneri-Fitzpatrick | Republican | 2022 | Nassau | Malverne |
| 10 | James Sanders Jr. | Democratic | 2012 | Queens | Queens (Far Rockaway) |
| 11 | Toby Ann Stavisky | Democratic | 1999 (Note: First elected in a special election.) | Queens | Queens (Whitestone) |
| 12 | Aber Kawas | Democratic | 2026 | Queens | Queens (Astoria) |
| 13 | Jessica Ramos | Democratic | 2018 | Queens | Queens (East Elmhurst) |
| 14 | Leroy Comrie | Democratic | 2014 | Queens | Queens (St. Albans) |
| 15 | Joseph Addabbo Jr. | Democratic | 2008 | Queens | Queens (Ozone Park) |
| 16 | John Liu | Democratic | 2018 | Queens | Queens (Flushing) |
| 17 | Stephen T. Chan | Republican | 2024 | Kings | Brooklyn (Bensonhurst) |
| 18 | Julia Salazar | Democratic | 2018 | Kings | Brooklyn (Bushwick) |
| 19 | Roxanne Persaud | Democratic | 2015 | Kings | Brooklyn (Canarsie) |
| 20 | Zellnor Myrie | Democratic | 2018 | Kings | Brooklyn (Prospect Lefferts Gardens) |
| 21 | Kevin Parker | Democratic | 2002 | Kings | Brooklyn (Flatbush) |
| 22 | Sam Sutton | Democratic | 2025 | Kings | Brooklyn (Midwood) |
| 23 | Jessica Scarcella-Spanton | Democratic | 2022 | Kings, Richmond | Staten Island (North Shore) |
| 24 | Andrew Lanza | Republican | 2006 | Richmond | Staten Island (Great Kills) |
| 25 | Jabari Brisport | Democratic | 2020 | Kings | Brooklyn (Clinton Hill) |
| 26 | Andrew Gounardes | Democratic | 2018 | Kings | Brooklyn (Bay Ridge) |
| 27 | Brian P. Kavanagh | Democratic | 2017 | New York | Manhattan (East Side) |
| 28 | Liz Krueger | Democratic | 2002 | New York | Manhattan (Upper East Side) |
| 29 | José M. Serrano | Democratic | 2004 | New York, Bronx | The Bronx (South Bronx) |
| 30 | Cordell Cleare | Democratic | 2021 | New York | Manhattan (Harlem) |
| 31 | Robert Jackson | Democratic | 2018 | New York, Bronx | Manhattan (Fort George) |
| 32 | Luis R. Sepúlveda | Democratic | 2018 | Bronx | The Bronx (West Farms) |
| 33 | Gustavo Rivera | Democratic | 2010 | Bronx | The Bronx (University Heights) |
| 34 | Nathalia Fernandez | Democratic | 2022 | Bronx, Westchester | The Bronx (Morris Park) |
| 35 | Andrea Stewart-Cousins | Democratic | 2006 | Westchester | Yonkers |
| 36 | Jamaal Bailey | Democratic | 2016 | Bronx, Westchester | The Bronx (Baychester) |
| 37 | Shelley Mayer | Democratic | 2018 | Westchester | Yonkers |
| 38 | Bill Weber | Republican | 2022 | Rockland | Montebello |
| 39 | Robert Rolison | Republican | 2022 | Dutchess, Orange, Putnam | Poughkeepsie |
| 40 | Peter Harckham | Democratic | 2018 | Putnam, Rockland, Westchester | South Salem |
| 41 | Michelle Hinchey | Democratic | 2020 | Columbia, Dutchess, Greene, Ulster | Saugerties |
| 42 | James Skoufis | Democratic | 2018 | Orange | Cornwall |
| 43 | Jake Ashby | Republican | 2022 | Albany, Rensselaer, Washington | Castleton-on-Hudson |
| 44 | Jim Tedisco | Republican | 2016 | Saratoga, Schenectady | Glenville |
| 45 | Dan Stec | Republican | 2020 | Clinton, Essex, Franklin, Saint Lawrence, Warren, Washington | Queensbury |
| 46 | Patricia Fahy | Democratic | 2024 | Albany, Montgomery, Schenectady | Albany |
| 47 | Erik Bottcher | Democratic | 2026 | New York | Manhattan (Chelsea) |
| 48 | Rachel May | Democratic | 2018 | Cayuga, Onondaga | Syracuse |
| 49 | Mark Walczyk | Republican | 2022 | Fulton, Hamilton, Herkimer, Jefferson, Lewis, Oswego, St. Lawrence | Watertown |
| 50 | Chris Ryan | Democratic | 2024 | Onondaga, Oswego | Syracuse |
| 51 | Peter Oberacker | Republican | 2020 | Broome, Chenango, Delaware, Herkimer, Otsego, Schoharie, Sullivan, Ulster | Schenevus |
| 52 | Lea Webb | Democratic | 2022 | Broome, Cortland, Tompkins | Binghamton |
| 53 | Joseph Griffo | Republican | 2006 | Chenango, Madison, Oneida | Rome |
| 54 | Pam Helming | Republican | 2016 | Livingston, Monroe, Ontario, Wayne | Canandaigua |
| 55 | Samra Brouk | Democratic | 2020 | Monroe | Rochester |
| 56 | Jeremy Cooney | Democratic | 2020 | Monroe | Rochester |
| 57 | George Borrello | Republican | 2019 | Allegany, Cattaraugus, Chautauqua, Genesee, Wyoming | Sunset Bay |
| 58 | Tom O'Mara | Republican | 2010 | Allegany, Chemung, Schuyler, Seneca, Steuben, Tioga, Yates | Big Flats |
| 59 | Kristen Gonzalez | Democratic | 2022 | Kings, New York, Queens | Queens (Long Island City) |
| 60 | Patrick M. Gallivan | Republican | 2010 | Erie | Elma |
| 61 | Jeremy Zellner | Democratic | 2026 | Erie | Tonawanda |
| 62 | Rob Ortt | Republican | 2014 | Monroe, Niagara, Orleans | North Tonawanda |
| 63 | April Baskin | Democratic | 2024 | Erie | Buffalo |

== See also ==
- New York State Assembly
- New York State Capitol
- New York Provincial Congress
- List of New York state senators (past and present)
- List of New York State Legislature members expelled or censured
