= 2010 New York state elections =

- November 2, 2010

Elections were held in the State of New York on November 2, 2010. Due to the special election for US Senate, all of New York's six statewide offices were up for popular election on the same date. At the same time, all 29 members from New York of the U.S. House of Representatives, all 212 members of the New York State legislature, and many other local officials were elected.

The Democratic Party swept all of the statewide races. However, Republicans made net gains of six seats in the House of Representatives and retook control of the New York State Senate, winning 32 Senate seats to the Democrats' 30.

== United States Senate ==
Democratic Senator Charles Schumer won reelection against Jay Townsend, his Republican opponent.

Democratic Senator Hillary Clinton resigned her position in 2009 to become United States Secretary of State in the Obama administration. Democrat Kirsten Gillibrand was appointed to the seat by Governor David Paterson. On November 2, 2010, a special election was held to fill the seat for the remainder of Clinton's unexpired term. Gillibrand defeated Republican Joseph J. DioGuardi in the special election.

== United States House ==
The House seat in New York's 29th congressional district seat was vacated by Democrat Eric Massa, who resigned March 8, 2010. Under the authority of Article I in the U.S. constitution and provisions in New York state law, Governor David Paterson was supposed to call a special election in spring 2010 to fill the seat. However, Paterson waited until September to call the election and scheduled it for the same day as the general election. Two concurrent elections were held, one to fill the remainder of Massa's term (November to January) and one to fill the seat in the subsequent Congress. Both elections had the same candidates on the ballot, Democrat Matthew Zeller and Republican Tom Reed. Reed prevailed in both elections.

All of the New York congressional districts that were expected to be competitive were in Democratic hands; Republicans were expected to mount serious challenges to Democratic incumbents in districts 1, 13, 19, 20, 23, 24, 25 and 29. Republican candidates won their races in Congressional Districts 13, 19, 20, 24, 25, and 29. Republican candidates prevailed in a total of eight congressional races in New York, while Democratic candidates prevailed in the other 21; thus, the GOP gained a total of six House seats in New York.

== State ==
=== Governor ===
Eliot Spitzer, a Democrat, resigned his post as governor of New York in 2008 due to a prostitution scandal. David Paterson, the Lieutenant Governor of New York, succeeded Spitzer. Paterson did not seek election to a full term in 2010.

The following tickets were filed with the New York State Board of Elections:

- Democratic Party: Andrew Cuomo/Bob Duffy (won the general election on November 2, 2010)
- Republican Party: Carl Paladino/Greg Edwards
- Independence Party: Cuomo/Duffy
- Conservative Party: Paladino/Edwards
- Working Families Party: Cuomo/Duffy
- Taxpayers Party: Paladino/Edwards
- Libertarian Party: Warren Redlich/Alden Link
- Green Party: Howie Hawkins/Gloria Mattera
- Rent is Too Damn High Party: Jimmy McMillan/no running mate
- Anti-Prohibition Party: Kristin M. Davis/Tanya Gendelman
- Freedom Party: Charles Barron/Eva Doyle

Andrew Cuomo and Bob Duffy prevailed in the election, receiving 61.4% of the vote.

=== Attorney General ===
In the wake of incumbent Andrew Cuomo's decision to pursue the governor's post and not seek re-election, five Democrats ran in a primary election; the winner was State Senator Eric Schneiderman, who had heavy backing from labor. Dan Donovan was the nominee of the Republican and Conservative parties. Schneiderman prevailed over Donovan in the general election on November 2, 2010, by a margin of 54.9% to 43.7%.

=== Comptroller ===
In February 2007, Thomas DiNapoli was chosen by the New York State Legislature to complete the unexpired term of Alan Hevesi following Hevesi's resignation. DiNapoli faced Republican Harry Wilson in the 2010 election. DiNapoli prevailed over Wilson in the general election on November 2, 2010, by a margin of 50.78% to 46.26%.

=== State Senate ===
All 62 seats of the New York State Senate were up for election in 2010 in accordance with state law.

Republicans retook the Senate majority in the 2010 elections, winning 32 seats to the Democrats' 30 on Election Day. One Republican Senate incumbent, Senator Frank Padavan of Queens, was defeated, while four Democratic incumbents (Sens. Brian Foley, Antoine Thompson, Darrel Aubertine, and Craig Johnson) were defeated in the general election. Democratic candidate David Carlucci was elected to an open seat in Senate District 38 that had become vacant due to the July 2010 death of Republican Senator Thomas Morahan. After defeating incumbent William Stachowski in a Democratic primary, Timothy M. Kennedy prevailed in the general election in Senate District 58. The Republicans' takeover of control of the State Senate was not confirmed until Johnson, who had sought a full hand recount of his race, exhausted his final appeal on December 20, 2010.

==== Open seats ====
- 12th district: Democrat George Onorato announced he would not seek reelection. Assemblyman Michael N. Gianaris, a Democrat, ran for the seat. Gianaris won the general election on November 2, 2010.
- 31st district: Eric Schneiderman, a Democrat who represents a district on the upper-east side of Manhattan, vacated his seat to run successfully for Attorney General. Assemblyman Adriano Espaillat won the Democratic party nomination to succeed Schneiderman. Espaillat won the general election on November 2, 2010.
- 38th district: Thomas Morahan, the Republican who represented this district in Rockland County, died in July 2010 from leukemia; he had already announced his retirement before his death. Five-term Rockland County executive and former lieutenant governor candidate C. Scott Vanderhoef, a Republican, ran to replace him, against three term Clarkstown Town Clerk David Carlucci. Carlucci prevailed in the general election.
- 40th district: Incumbent Republican Vincent Leibell announced he would not seek reelection and would instead run for Putnam County Executive. (Leibell was elected Putnam County Executive, but resigned from both posts in December 2010 amid rumors of corruption charges.) Michael Kaplowitz, Westchester County Legislator was the Democratic candidate. Republican Greg Ball, an Assemblyman, won his party's primary. Ball went on to win the general election.
- 53rd district: Republican George H. Winner, Jr. unexpectedly announced he would not seek re-election on June 2, 2010. Assemblymen Tom O'Mara and James Bacalles, both Republicans representing adjacent districts, made known their intentions to pursue the seat; O'Mara won the Republican primary and ran against Ithaca Democrat Pamela Mackesey. O'Mara won the general election.
- 59th district: Republican Dale Volker retired after 19 terms (38 years) in office. Former Erie County Sheriff Patrick Gallivan won a three-way the Republican primary, although Republican candidates Jim Domagalski and David DiPietro initially remained in the race on minor party lines. (Domagalski eventually withdrew his candidacy). Cynthia Appleton, a Village of Warsaw Trustee and critical care nurse, was the nominee of the Democratic and Working Families Parties. Gallivan prevailed in the general election.

==== Notable races ====
- 1st district: Incumbent Republican Kenneth LaValle, who has served 17 terms (34 years), ran unopposed in 2008. The district includes the five East End towns of Long Island, and the eastern half of the Town of Brookhaven. LaValle faced a potentially formidable Democratic challenger in corporate fraud lawyer Regina Calcaterra, but Calcaterra dropped out after it was revealed that she had not met state residency requirements and was replaced on the ballot by Jennifer Maertz. LaValle won the general election on November 2, 2010.
- 3rd district: Incumbent Democrat Brian X. Foley was elected in 2008 to a seat held by Republican Caesar Trunzo since 1972. In 2010, Foley was opposed by former 2008 1st Congressional District Republican nominee Lee Zeldin. The district stretches across the south shore of Suffolk County from Brentwood to Mastic Beach. Zeldin defeated Foley, the one-term incumbent, in the general election on November 2, 2010, by a margin of 58% to 42%.
- 6th district: Incumbent Republican Kemp Hannon has represented this district since 1989. The district includes Levittown, Massapequa, Garden City, Uniondale, Hempstead, Farmingdale, Franklin Square, Old Bethpage, Salisbury, Garden City South, Plainview, Lakeview, Plainedge, Island Trees and East Meadow. In 2008, Hannon was almost defeated by political newcomer Kristen M. McElroy. Hannon was initially opposed by Democrat Dave Mejias, but Mejias withdrew his candidacy following his arrest on charges of stalking and battery and was replaced on the ballot by Francesca Carlow. Hannon won the general election on November 2, 2010.
- 7th district: Incumbent Democrat Craig M. Johnson was elected in a special election in 2007 and subsequently elected to a full term in November 2008. The district is located in the northwest corner of Nassau County. Mineola mayor Jack Martins ran on the Republican line. On December 4, 2010, the election results in this closely contested race were certified; Republican challenger Jack Martins prevailed. The margin of victory was just 451 votes, 0.5%, and there were discrepancies in two of the 7 machine counts that were audited, leading Democrats to call for a full hand recount. Democrats promised to appeal the decision. However, on December 20, 2010, the New York Court of Appeals rejected Johnson's final appeal and ruled that Martins had won the election; Johnson then conceded.
- 11th district: Incumbent Republican Frank Padavan represented this district since 1972. The district includes Queens Village, Flushing, Bayside, Whitestone, Douglaston, Little Neck, College Point, Bellerose, Hollis, Jamaica Estates, Floral Park, and Glen Oaks. In 2008 he won by only 483 votes over New York City Council member James F. Gennaro. Padavan's challenger in the 2010 election was Democrat Tony Avella. Avella defeated incumbent Padavan on November 2, 2010.
- 15th district: Incumbent Democrat Joseph Addabbo Jr. defeated Republican Senator Serphin R. Maltese in 2008. He faced Republican Anthony Como, a former city councilman. Addabbo won the general election on November 2, 2010.
- 16th district: Incumbent Democrat Toby Ann Stavisky faced two primary challengers: multi-millionaire, cancer researcher and professor Dr. Isaac Sasson and attorney John A. Messer. Stavisky won the primary. She won the general election on November 2, 2010.
- 27th district: Incumbent Democrat Carl Kruger faced a primary challenge from administrative judge Igor Oberman. Kruger came under fire for his vote against same-sex marriage and for his involvement with the dissident Amigos faction within the Democratic caucus. Oberman failed to submit the necessary signatures to participate in the primary. Kruger won the general election on November 2, 2010.
- 32nd district: Incumbent Democrat Rubén Díaz Sr. faced a potential primary challenge from Charlie Ramos; the socially conservative Diaz has come under fire for his public opposition to same-sex marriage, but nevertheless won the primary by a margin of 79% to 22%, and went on to win the general election on November 2, 2010.
- 33rd district: Incumbent Democrat Pedro Espada Jr. faced primary challenges from Desiree Pilgrim-Hunter and José Gustavo Rivera. Espada gained notoriety and earned disdain from Democrats for his brief alliance with Senate Republicans in 2009 that led to his elevation to Senate majority leader; he is currently being investigated by the Bronx County District Attorney in relation to questions regarding whether he meets residency requirements for representing the 33rd district, the IRS for alleged tax fraud, and by the State Attorney General for looting a state-funded health clinic. Espada was defeated by an almost 2-to-1 margin by Rivera in the Democratic primary on September 14, 2010, and Rivera prevailed in the November 2 general election.
- 35th district: Incumbent Democrat Andrea Stewart-Cousins has represented the Yonkers-based district since 2006. Former Yonkers City Councilman Liam McLaughlin was her Republican opponent. Stewart-Cousins won the general election on November 2, 2010.
- 37th district: Incumbent Democrat Suzi Oppenheimer sought re-election (to a 14th term) against Scarsdale real estate executive Bob Cohen, a Republican. Initial election results showed the two candidates almost neck and neck, but in early December, Cohen conceded the race to Oppenheimer.
- 46th district: Incumbent Democrat Neil Breslin sought re-election to his Albany-based district. He faced a primary from Luke Martland and Tim Carney. Republican Robert Domenici, a retired Army Lt. Colonel and member of the South Colonie School board, ran against the Democrat in the general election. Breslin won the primary. Breslin also prevailed in the November 2 general election.
- 48th district: In this Thousand Islands area district, which includes Watertown, incumbent Democrat Darrel Aubertine (a frequent target of the Republicans) faced St. Lawrence County clerk Patty Ritchie. Ritchie defeated incumbent Aubertine in the general election on November 2, 2010.
- 49th district: In the Syracuse area, incumbent Democrat David Valesky faced Republican musician Andrew Russo, who defeated East Syracuse mayor Danny Liedka in the Republican primary. Valesky won the general election on November 2, 2010.
- 58th district: Incumbent Democrat William (Bill) Stachowski, who served for nearly 30 years in the Senate, faced an unexpectedly close race in 2008, winning 53 percent to Dennis Delano's 47 percent. The district includes parts of Buffalo, all of the city of Lackawanna, and the towns of Cheektowaga, West Seneca, Hamburg and Eden. In the 2010 race, Stachowski was defeated in the Democratic primary by Timothy M. "Tim" Kennedy, the district 2 member on the Erie County Legislature. Stachowski remained on the Conservative and Independence party lines, while Assemblyman Jack Quinn III, son of former congressman Jack Quinn, ran on the Republican line. Kennedy edged out Quinn by about 1,800 votes (2 percent) to win the seat, while Stachowski managed to get 7 percent of the vote.
- 60th district: Incumbent Democrat Antoine Thompson has held this seat since 2006. Former state senator Alfred Coppola and Rory Allen, a Buffalo business owner challenged Thompson in the primary election; both lost heavily to the incumbent. Mark Grisanti was Thompson's Republican opponent in the general election on November 2, 2010. Antoine Thompson conceded the general election to Mark Grisanti on November 30, 2010.

=== State Assembly ===
All 150 seats in the Assembly were up for election. Before the November 2 elections, the Democratic Party held an enrollment advantage of 107 seats (including two Independence Party of New York members who caucused with the Democrats) to 42 seats over the Republican Party, with one vacancy. Republicans gained 7 seats, one from Independence and six from Democrats, thereby reducing Democrats to a 99-50-1 majority.

==== Open seats ====
- 14th District: Incumbent Republican Robert Barra decided to retire, citing health issues. Lynbrook Mayor Brian Curran, a Republican, announced that he would run for the seat. Curran defeated Democrat Dermond Thomas in the general election on November 2, 2010.
- 122nd district: Incumbent Dede Scozzafava, a Republican, retired from her seat. Kenneth "Ken" Blankenbush, the Jefferson County legislator who had planned to challenge Scozzafava in the primary, ran to replace her. In the September 14 Democratic primary Brian McGrath won. McGrath, like many other Democratic candidates also ran on the Independence Party of New York State ticket. Blankenbush won the Republican Party primary and like many other Republicans also ran on the Conservative Party line. In the general election on November 2, 2010, Blankenbush defeated McGrath.
- 136th district: Incumbent James Bacalles, a Republican, vacated the seat to run unsuccessfully for the 53rd district Senate seat being vacated by George Winner. (Bacalles was defeated by Tom O'Mara in the 53rd district.) Philip Palmesano won the Republican nomination for the seat. George Matthewson and Randy Weaver were running for the Democratic nomination, but both were controversially removed from the ballot as a result of a technicality, leaving the Democratic line blank. Jason Jordon, nominally a registered Democrat, ran as an independent on the "Common Sense" party line. Palmesano won the general election on November 2, 2010.
- 137th district: Incumbent Tom O'Mara, a Republican, vacated the seat to pursue the 53rd Senate seat vacated by George Winner. (O'Mara won the 53rd district Senate seat, defeating James Bacalles.) Republican Christopher Friend faced off against Democrat James Hare and Conservative Party candidate Paul Marcellus. Friend won the general election on November 2, 2010.
- 150th District Incumbent Democrat William Parment had represented this district, which covers the southwesternmost corner of the state, since 1982. He announced his retirement in July 2010. Prior to his resignation, former Chautauqua County executive Andrew Goodell had announced his candidacy against Parment, marking the first serious challenge against Parment in several years. Nancy Gay Bargar, a former Majority Leader and Minority Leader of the County Legislature was nominated by Democratic Party to run. Goodell won the general election against Bargar on November 2, 2010.

==== Notable races ====
- 3rd District: Incumbent Republican L. Dean Murray was elected in a special election on February 9, 2010. He is the first Republican elected to the Southwest Brookhaven district in 13 years. Murray won re-election on November 2, 2010.
- 5th District: Incumbent Democrat Ginny Fields was first elected in a special election in 2004. In the September 13, 2010 primary, she was defeated by local Democrat Kenneth Mangan, but ran on the Working Families Party and Independence lines in the November 2, 2010 general election, facing challenges from Mangan and Republican Al Graf, in a district that borders a recent Republican pick up, in the 3rd Assembly District, and which is currently located within the 3rd Senate District, where Democratic State Senator, Brian X. Foley, lost his bid for re-election on November 2, 2010, to Lee Zeldin. Graf defeated Mangan and Fields, who ran as a third-party candidate.
- 49th District: Incumbent Democrat Peter Abbate faced a challenge from the winner of the Republican primary, Peter Cipriano. The 49th District was the only district in Brooklyn to vote for John McCain for President in 2008, but Abbate won re-election over Cipriano on November 2, 2010.
- 60th District: Incumbent Democrat Janele Hyer-Spencer was first elected in 2006 in a close race for an open seat formerly held by a retiring Republican. Local republicans recruited Nicole Malliotakis, who defeated Hyer-Spencer in the general election on November 2, 2010.
- 64th District: Incumbent Democrat Sheldon Silver sued to prevent Republican Joan Lipp from appearing on the ballot, as well as to disallow the Republican Party from naming a replacement.
- 108th District: Incumbent Timothy Gordon, a member of the Independence Party, faced a rematch from his 2008 challenger Steve McLaughlin, on the Republican and Taxpayers Party lines. Before Gordon won the open seat in 2006, the seat was in Republican hands. Steve McLaughlin prevailed over Tim Gordon in the November 2, 2010 general election.
- 109th District: Incumbent Democrat Robert Reilly, who also ran as the nominee of the Independence Party of New York State, and the Working Families Party, has represented this Albany County-based district since 2004. He faced potential challenges from several Republicans including Halfmoon Town board member Craig Hayner, former deputy state Attorney General Jennifer Whalen and attorney James Whalen. Jennifer Whalen was also listed as a candidate of the Conservative Party. Reilly won the general election on November 2, 2010, narrowly defeating Whalen.
- 114th District: Incumbent Republican Janet Duprey faced a primary challenge from Cadyville businessman David Kimmel, stemming from her support of Dede Scozzafava in the New York 23 special congressional election. Rudy Johnson, a former energy analyst and small businessman, will run on the Democratic ticket in the general election. Duprey won re-election on November 2, 2010.
- 120th District: Incumbent Democrat William Magnarelli has represented his Syracuse-based district since 1998. He faced a challenge from Republican David Andrew Gay, who initially sought the Republican nomination for New York's 25th Congressional District; Gay was endorsed by Ron Paul. Magnarelli won re-election on November 2, 2010.
- 121st District: Incumbent Democrat Albert Stirpe has represented his Syracuse-based district since 2006 where he won the election after Republican Jeffrey Brown vacated the seat to run for the State Senate. He faced a challenge from Republican Don Miller, a local businessman. Stirpe conceded the race to Miller on November 18, 2010.

=== Judicial positions ===
- New York judicial elections, 2010 at Judgepedia
