= 2012 New York State Senate election =

- November 6, 2012

All 63 seats in the New York State Senate 32 seats needed for a majority
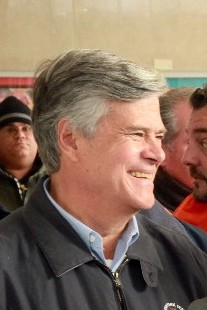

| | Majority party | Minority party |
|---|---|---|
| Leader | Dean Skelos | John L. Sampson |
| Party | Republican | Democratic |
| Leader's seat | 9th District | 19th District |
| Seats before | 33 | 29 |
| Seats after | 30 | 33 |
| Seat change | ▼3 | ▲4 |
- Results: Democratic gain Democratic hold Republican hold
Temporary President and Majority Leader before election
Dean Skelos
Republican
Temporary President and Majority Leader
Dean Skelos
Republican

The 2012 New York State Senate elections were held on November 6, 2012 to elect representatives from all 63 State Senate districts in the U.S. state of New York. Primary elections were held on September 13, 2012.

Democrats won a total of 33 seats for a three-seat majority. Democrats gained seats in Senate Districts 17 (where Democrat Simcha Felder defeated Republican incumbent David Storobin), 41, and 55 (where Ted O'Brien defeated Sean Hanna to win the seat vacated by the retiring Republican Sen. Jim Alesi), and won the election in the newly created Senate District 46. In Senate District 46, Republican George Amedore was named the winner and was sworn in as a senator. However, a recount revealed that Democrat Cecilia Tkaczyk had defeated Amedore by 18 votes; therefore, Amedore vacated the seat (becoming the shortest-tenured senator in modern New York history) and Tkaczyk was sworn in.

Of the four Republican state senators who voted for the Marriage Equality Act in 2011 (Sens. Roy McDonald, James Alesi, Mark Grisanti, and Stephen Saland), only Grisanti was re-elected in 2012.

On December 4, 2012, it was announced that Senate Republicans had reached a power-sharing deal with the four-member Independent Democratic Conference (IDC). Together, the Senate Republicans and the IDC held enough seats to form a governing majority. That majority was augmented when freshman Sen. Simcha Felder of Brooklyn, a Democrat, joined the Senate Republican Conference.

== Predictions ==
| Source | Ranking | As of |
|---|---|---|
| Governing | Tossup | October 24, 2012 |

== Retirements ==
- 4th District: Fifteen-term incumbent Republican Owen H. Johnson, 83, did not seek re-election. Assemblyman Philip Boyle was endorsed by the Republican, Conservative and Independence Parties. Boyle defeated Democrat Ricardo Montano.
- 29th District: Seven-term incumbent Democrat Thomas Duane did not seek re-election in this predominantly LGBT district; Brad Hoylman sought the seat and was elected without opposition.
- 37th District: 14-term Democratic senator Suzi Oppenheimer did not seek re-election. Democratic Assemblyman George S. Latimer defeated Republican Bob Cohen in November.
- 46th District: This newly created district stretches from Montgomery County south to Ulster County. Assemblyman George Amedore ran on the Republican line against Democrat Cecilia Tkaczyk. On January 17, 2013, the final recount was certified, and Tkaczyk was declared the winner by 18 votes.
- 55th District: Incumbent Republican senator James Alesi announced that he would not seek re-election, citing concerns about his ability to prevail against a potential primary challenger following his controversial 2011 vote in favor of same-sex marriage. Monroe County Legislator Ted O'Brien ran as a Democrat, and Assemblyman Sean Hanna received the Republican nomination. O'Brien defeated Hanna.

== District 1 ==
New York's 1st State Senate district election, 2012
| Party | Candidate | Votes | % |
|---|---|---|---|
| Republican | Kenneth LaValle (incumbent) | 76,006 | 59.7 |
| Democratic | Bridget M. Fleming | 51,301 | 40.3 |
| Total votes | | 127,307 | 100.0 |
| Republican hold | | | |

== District 2 ==
New York's 2nd State Senate district election, 2012
| Party | Candidate | Votes | % |
|---|---|---|---|
| Republican | John J. Flanagan (incumbent) | 80,004 | 67.5 |
| Democratic | Errol D. Toulon, Jr. | 38,482 | 32.5 |
| Total votes | | 118,486 | 100.0 |
| Republican hold | | | |

== District 3 ==
New York's 3rd State Senate district election, 2012
| Party | Candidate | Votes | % |
|---|---|---|---|
| Republican | Lee Zeldin (incumbent) | 52,057 | 55.7 |
| Democratic | Francis T. Genco | 41,372 | 44.3 |
| Total votes | | 93,429 | 100.0 |
| Republican hold | | | |

== District 4 ==
New York's 4th State Senate district election, 2012
| Party | Candidate | Votes | % |
|---|---|---|---|
| Republican | Philip Boyle | 54,515 | 52.6 |
| Democratic | Ricardo Montano | 49,223 | 47.4 |
| Total votes | | 103,738 | 100.0 |
| Republican hold | | | |

== District 5 ==
New York's 5th State Senate district election, 2012
| Party | Candidate | Votes | % |
|---|---|---|---|
| Republican | Carl Marcellino (incumbent) | 73,947 | 59.8 |
| Democratic | David B. Wright | 49,647 | 40.2 |
| Total votes | | 123,594 | 100.0 |
| Republican hold | | | |

== District 6 ==
New York's 6th State Senate district election, 2012
| Party | Candidate | Votes | % |
|---|---|---|---|
| Republican | Kemp Hannon (incumbent) | 58,843 | 52.0 |
| Democratic | Ryan E. Cronin | 54,382 | 48.0 |
| Total votes | | 113,225 | 100.0 |
| Republican hold | | | |

== District 7 ==
New York's 7th State Senate district election, 2012
| Party | Candidate | Votes | % |
|---|---|---|---|
| Republican | Jack Martins (incumbent) | 58,039 | 51.8 |
| Democratic | Daniel S. Ross | 53,987 | 48.2 |
| Total votes | | 112,026 | 100.0 |
| Republican hold | | | |

== District 8 ==
New York's 8th State Senate district election, 2012
| Party | Candidate | Votes | % |
|---|---|---|---|
| Republican | Charles Fuschillo (incumbent) | 68,708 | 59.2 |
| Democratic | Carol A. Gordon | 47,393 | 40.8 |
| Total votes | | 116,101 | 100.0 |
| Republican hold | | | |

== District 9 ==
New York's 9th State Senate district election, 2012
| Party | Candidate | Votes | % |
|---|---|---|---|
| Republican | Dean Skelos (incumbent) | 68,816 | 60.7 |
| Democratic | Thomas H. Feffer | 44,646 | 39.3 |
| Total votes | | 113,462 | 100.0 |
| Republican hold | | | |

== District 10 ==
New York's 10th State Senate district election, 2012
| Party | Candidate | Votes | % |
|---|---|---|---|
| Democratic | James Sanders, Jr. | 67,474 | 100.0 |
| Total votes | | 67,474 | 100.0 |
| Democratic hold | | | |

== District 11 ==
New York's 11th State Senate district election, 2012
| Party | Candidate | Votes | % |
|---|---|---|---|
| Democratic | Tony Avella (incumbent) | 64,776 | 73.3 |
| Republican | Joseph R. Concannon | 23,550 | 26.7 |
| Total votes | | 88,326 | 100.0 |
| Democratic hold | | | |

== District 12 ==
New York's 12th State Senate district election, 2012
| Party | Candidate | Votes | % |
|---|---|---|---|
| Democratic | Michael Gianaris (incumbent) | 61,843 | 86.4 |
| Republican | Aurelio A. Arcabascio | 9,775 | 13.6 |
| Total votes | | 71,618 | 100.0 |
| Democratic hold | | | |

== District 13 ==
New York's 13th State Senate district election, 2012
| Party | Candidate | Votes | % |
|---|---|---|---|
| Democratic | Jose Peralta (incumbent) | 49,893 | 100.0 |
| Total votes | | 49,893 | 100.0 |
| Democratic hold | | | |

== District 14 ==
New York's 14th State Senate district election, 2012
| Party | Candidate | Votes | % |
|---|---|---|---|
| Democratic | Malcolm Smith (incumbent) | 86,419 | 100.0 |
| Total votes | | 86,419 | 100.0 |
| Democratic hold | | | |

== District 15 ==
New York's 15th State Senate district election, 2012
| Party | Candidate | Votes | % |
|---|---|---|---|
| Democratic | Joseph Addabbo Jr. (incumbent) | 42,190 | 57.6 |
| Republican | Eric Ulrich | 31,036 | 42.4 |
| Total votes | | 73,226 | 100.0 |
| Democratic hold | | | |

== District 16 ==
New York's 16th State Senate district election, 2012
| Party | Candidate | Votes | % |
|---|---|---|---|
| Democratic | Toby Ann Stavisky (incumbent) | 43,980 | 76.5 |
| Republican | J. D. Kim | 13,507 | 23.5 |
| Total votes | | 57,487 | 100.0 |
| Democratic hold | | | |

== District 17 ==
New York's 17th State Senate district election, 2012
| Party | Candidate | Votes | % |
|---|---|---|---|
| Democratic | Simcha Felder | 39,266 | 66.4 |
| Republican | David Storobin (incumbent) | 19,338 | 32.7 |
| Socialist | Abraham Tischler | 528 | 0.9 |
| Total votes | | 59,132 | 100.0 |
| Democratic gain from Republican | | | |

== District 18 ==
New York's 18th State Senate district election, 2012
| Party | Candidate | Votes | % |
|---|---|---|---|
| Democratic | Martin Malave Dilan (incumbent) | 69,749 | 94.6 |
| Republican | Michael E. Freeman-Saulsberre | 3,987 | 5.4 |
| Total votes | | 73,736 | 100.0 |
| Democratic hold | | | |

== District 19 ==
New York's 19th State Senate district election, 2012
| Party | Candidate | Votes | % |
|---|---|---|---|
| Democratic | John L. Sampson (incumbent) | 78,974 | 90.3 |
| Republican | Jane Neal | 7,226 | 8.3 |
| Conservative | Elias J. Weir | 1,196 | 1.4 |
| Total votes | | 87,396 | 100.0 |
| Democratic hold | | | |

== District 20 ==
New York's 20th State Senate district election, 2012
| Party | Candidate | Votes | % |
|---|---|---|---|
| Democratic | Eric Adams (incumbent) | 81,110 | 95.7 |
| Republican | Rose Laney | 2,683 | 3.2 |
| Conservative | Brian Kelly | 938 | 1.1 |
| Total votes | | 84,731 | 100.0 |
| Democratic hold | | | |

== District 21 ==
New York's 21st State Senate district election, 2012
| Party | Candidate | Votes | % |
|---|---|---|---|
| Democratic | Kevin Parker (incumbent) | 95,310 | 97.2 |
| Conservative | Mindy Meyer | 2,733 | 2.8 |
| Total votes | | 98,043 | 100.0 |
| Democratic hold | | | |

== District 22 ==
New York's 22nd State Senate district election, 2012
| Party | Candidate | Votes | % |
|---|---|---|---|
| Republican | Martin Golden (incumbent) | 38,584 | 57.7 |
| Democratic | Andrew Gounardes | 28,243 | 42.3 |
| Total votes | | 66,827 | 100.0 |
| Republican hold | | | |

== District 23 ==
New York's 23rd State Senate district election, 2012
| Party | Candidate | Votes | % |
|---|---|---|---|
| Democratic | Diane Savino (incumbent) | 50,555 | 77.0 |
| Republican | Lisa Grey | 15,131 | 23.0 |
| Total votes | | 65,686 | 100.0 |
| Democratic hold | | | |

== District 24 ==
New York's 24th State Senate district election, 2012
| Party | Candidate | Votes | % |
|---|---|---|---|
| Republican | Andrew Lanza (incumbent) | 78,418 | 74.5 |
| Democratic | Gary W. Carsel | 26,893 | 25.5 |
| Total votes | | 105,311 | 100.0 |
| Republican hold | | | |

== District 25 ==
New York's 25th State Senate district election, 2012
| Party | Candidate | Votes | % |
|---|---|---|---|
| Democratic | Velmanette Montgomery (incumbent) | 102,940 | 97.2 |
| Republican | John A. Jasilli | 2,944 | 2.8 |
| Total votes | | 105,884 | 100.0 |
| Democratic hold | | | |

== District 26 ==
New York's 26th State Senate district election, 2012
| Party | Candidate | Votes | % |
|---|---|---|---|
| Democratic | Daniel Squadron (incumbent) | 71,621 | 86.7 |
| Republican | Jacqueline Haro | 10,943 | 13.3 |
| Total votes | | 82,564 | 100.0 |
| Democratic hold | | | |

== District 27 ==
New York's 27th State Senate district election, 2012
| Party | Candidate | Votes | % |
|---|---|---|---|
| Democratic | Brad Hoylman | 93,569 | 100.0 |
| Total votes | | 93,569 | 100.0 |
| Democratic hold | | | |

== District 28 ==
New York's 28th State Senate district election, 2012
| Party | Candidate | Votes | % |
|---|---|---|---|
| Democratic | Liz Krueger (incumbent) | 83,503 | 73.9 |
| Republican | David Paul Garland | 29,440 | 26.1 |
| Total votes | | 112,943 | 100.0 |
| Democratic hold | | | |

== District 29 ==
New York's 29th State Senate district election, 2012
| Party | Candidate | Votes | % |
|---|---|---|---|
| Democratic | Jose M. Serrano (incumbent) | 72,650 | 94.0 |
| Conservative | Robert Goodman | 3,382 | 4.4 |
| Green | Thomas Siracuse | 1,245 | 1.6 |
| Total votes | | 77,277 | 100.0 |
| Democratic hold | | | |

== District 30 ==
New York's 30th State Senate district election, 2012
| Party | Candidate | Votes | % |
|---|---|---|---|
| Democratic | Bill Perkins (incumbent) | 98,138 | 100.0 |
| Total votes | | 98,138 | 100.0 |
| Democratic hold | | | |

== District 31 ==
New York's 31st State Senate district election, 2012
| Party | Candidate | Votes | % |
|---|---|---|---|
| Democratic | Adriano Espaillat (incumbent) | 85,162 | 91.2 |
| Republican | Martin Chicon | 8,190 | 8.8 |
| Total votes | | 93,352 | 100.0 |
| Democratic hold | | | |

== District 32 ==
New York's 32nd State Senate district election, 2012
| Party | Candidate | Votes | % |
|---|---|---|---|
| Democratic | Rubén Díaz Sr. (incumbent) | 72,950 | 97.1 |
| Independence | David M. Johnson | 2,188 | 2.9 |
| Total votes | | 75,138 | 100.0 |
| Democratic hold | | | |

== District 33 ==
New York's 33rd State Senate district election, 2012
| Party | Candidate | Votes | % |
|---|---|---|---|
| Democratic | Gustavo Rivera (incumbent) | 57,167 | 96.1 |
| Republican | Michael E. Walters | 2,296 | 3.9 |
| Total votes | | 59,463 | 100.0 |
| Democratic hold | | | |

== District 34 ==
New York's 34th State Senate district election, 2012
| Party | Candidate | Votes | % |
|---|---|---|---|
| Democratic | Jeffrey Klein (incumbent) | 80,422 | 93.8 |
| Conservative | Elizabeth Perri | 3,940 | 4.6 |
| Green | Carl Lundgren | 1,348 | 1.6 |
| Total votes | | 85,710 | 100.0 |
| Democratic hold | | | |

== District 35 ==
New York's 35th State Senate district election, 2012
| Party | Candidate | Votes | % |
|---|---|---|---|
| Democratic | Andrea Stewart-Cousins (incumbent) | 84,180 | 100.0 |
| Total votes | | 84,180 | 100.0 |
| Democratic hold | | | |

== District 36 ==
New York's 36th State Senate district election, 2012
| Party | Candidate | Votes | % |
|---|---|---|---|
| Democratic | Ruth Hassell-Thompson (incumbent) | 86,733 | 97.7 |
| Conservative | Robert L. Diamond | 2,020 | 2.3 |
| Total votes | | 88,753 | 100.0 |
| Democratic hold | | | |

== District 37 ==
New York's 37th State Senate district election, 2012
| Party | Candidate | Votes | % |
|---|---|---|---|
| Democratic | George S. Latimer | 64,236 | 54.1 |
| Republican | Bob Cohen | 54,574 | 45.9 |
| Total votes | | 118,810 | 100.0 |
| Democratic hold | | | |

== District 38 ==
New York's 38th State Senate district election, 2012
| Party | Candidate | Votes | % |
|---|---|---|---|
| Democratic | David Carlucci (incumbent) | 75,428 | 70.6 |
| Republican | Janis A. Castaldi | 31,460 | 29.4 |
| Total votes | | 106,888 | 100.0 |
| Democratic hold | | | |

== District 39 ==
New York's 39th State Senate district election, 2010
| Party | Candidate | Votes | % |
|---|---|---|---|
| Republican | Bill Larkin (incumbent) | 54,921 | 52.5 |
| Democratic | Christopher W. Eachus | 49,746 | 47.5 |
| Total votes | | 104,667 | 100.0 |
| Republican hold | | | |

== District 40 ==
New York's 40th State Senate district election, 2012
| Party | Candidate | Votes | % |
|---|---|---|---|
| Republican | Greg Ball (incumbent) | 64,991 | 51.0 |
| Democratic | Justin R. Wagner | 62,325 | 49.0 |
| Total votes | | 127,316 | 100.0 |
| Republican hold | | | |

== District 41 ==
New York's 41st State Senate district election, 2012
| Party | Candidate | Votes | % |
|---|---|---|---|
| Democratic | Terry Gipson | 53,562 | 43.8 |
| Republican | Stephen Saland (incumbent) | 51,466 | 42.1 |
| Conservative | Neil A. DiCarlo | 17,300 | 14.1 |
| Total votes | | 122,328 | 100.0 |
| Democratic gain from Republican | | | |

== District 42 ==
New York's 42nd State Senate district election, 2012
| Party | Candidate | Votes | % |
|---|---|---|---|
| Republican | John Bonacic (incumbent) | 72,878 | 100.0 |
| Total votes | | 72,878 | 100.0 |
| Republican hold | | | |

== District 43 ==
New York's 43rd State Senate district election, 2012
| Party | Candidate | Votes | % |
|---|---|---|---|
| Republican | Kathleen A. Marchione | 60,856 | 47.2 |
| Democratic | Robin Andrews | 47,022 | 36.5 |
| Independence | Roy McDonald (incumbent) | 20,929 | 16.2 |
| Total votes | | 128,807 | 100.0 |
| Republican hold | | | |

== District 44 ==
New York's 44th State Senate district election, 2012
| Party | Candidate | Votes | % |
|---|---|---|---|
| Democratic | Neil Breslin (incumbent) | 61,771 | 87.5 |
| Green | Peter A. LaVenia, Jr. | 8,796 | 12.5 |
| Total votes | | 70,567 | 100.0 |
| Democratic hold | | | |

== District 45 ==
New York's 45th State Senate district election, 2012
| Party | Candidate | Votes | % |
|---|---|---|---|
| Republican | Betty Little (incumbent) | 87,266 | 100.0 |
| Total votes | | 87,266 | 100.0 |
| Republican hold | | | |

== District 46 ==
New York's 46th State Senate district election, 2012
| Party | Candidate | Votes | % |
|---|---|---|---|
| Democratic | Cecilia Tkaczyk | 63,213 | 50.007 |
| Republican | George Amedore | 63,195 | 49.993 |
| Total votes | | 126,408 | 100.0 |
| Democratic win (new seat) | | | |

== District 47 ==
New York's 47th State Senate district election, 2012
| Party | Candidate | Votes | % |
|---|---|---|---|
| Republican | Joseph Griffo (incumbent) | 81,429 | 100.0 |
| Total votes | | 81,429 | 100.0 |
| Republican hold | | | |

== District 48 ==
New York's 48th State Senate district election, 2012
| Party | Candidate | Votes | % |
|---|---|---|---|
| Republican | Patty Ritchie (incumbent) | 66,016 | 69.9 |
| Democratic | Amy M. Tresidder | 28,470 | 30.1 |
| Total votes | | 94,486 | 100.0 |
| Republican hold | | | |

== District 49 ==
New York's 49th State Senate district election, 2012
| Party | Candidate | Votes | % |
|---|---|---|---|
| Republican | Hugh Farley (incumbent) | 69,861 | 60.1 |
| Democratic | Madelyn C. Thorne | 46,415 | 39.9 |
| Total votes | | 116,276 | 100.0 |
| Republican hold | | | |

== District 50 ==
New York's 50th State Senate district election, 2012
| Party | Candidate | Votes | % |
|---|---|---|---|
| Republican | John DeFrancisco (incumbent) | 94,910 | 85.9 |
| Green | Michael F. Donnelly | 15,591 | 14.1 |
| Total votes | | 110,501 | 100.0 |
| Republican hold | | | |

== District 51 ==
New York's 51st State Senate district election, 2012
| Party | Candidate | Votes | % |
|---|---|---|---|
| Republican | James L. Seward (incumbent) | 76,428 | 68.6 |
| Democratic | Howard Leib | 34,967 | 31.4 |
| Total votes | | 111,395 | 100.0 |
| Republican hold | | | |

== District 52 ==
New York's 52nd State Senate district election, 2012
| Party | Candidate | Votes | % |
|---|---|---|---|
| Republican | Thomas W. Libous (incumbent) | 71,912 | 63.9 |
| Democratic | John P. Orzel | 37,856 | 33.6 |
| Working Families | Barrett Esworthy | 2,798 | 2.5 |
| Total votes | | 112,566 | 100.0 |
| Republican hold | | | |

== District 53 ==
New York's 53rd State Senate district election, 2012
| Party | Candidate | Votes | % |
|---|---|---|---|
| Democratic | David Valesky (incumbent) | 84,429 | 100.0 |
| Total votes | | 84,429 | 100.0 |
| Democratic hold | | | |

== District 54 ==
New York's 54th State Senate district election, 2012
| Party | Candidate | Votes | % |
|---|---|---|---|
| Republican | Michael Nozzolio (incumbent) | 96,302 | 100.0 |
| Total votes | | 96,302 | 100.0 |
| Republican hold | | | |

== District 55 ==
New York's 55th State Senate district election, 2012
| Party | Candidate | Votes | % |
|---|---|---|---|
| Democratic | Ted O'Brien | 70,020 | 52.0 |
| Republican | Sean Hanna | 64,572 | 48.0 |
| Total votes | | 134,592 | 100.0 |
| Democratic gain from Republican | | | |

== District 56 ==
New York's 56th State Senate district election, 2012
| Party | Candidate | Votes | % |
|---|---|---|---|
| Republican | Joseph Robach (incumbent) | 79,572 | 100.0 |
| Total votes | | 79,572 | 100.0 |
| Republican hold | | | |

== District 57 ==
New York's 57th State Senate district election, 2012
| Party | Candidate | Votes | % |
|---|---|---|---|
| Republican | Catharine Young (incumbent) | 93,254 | 100.0 |
| Total votes | | 93,254 | 100.0 |
| Republican hold | | | |

== District 58 ==
New York's 58th State Senate district election, 2012
| Party | Candidate | Votes | % |
|---|---|---|---|
| Republican | Tom O'Mara (incumbent) | 74,458 | 47.2 |
| Total votes | | 74,458 | 100.0 |
| Republican hold | | | |

== District 59 ==
New York's 59th State Senate district election, 2012
| Party | Candidate | Votes | % |
|---|---|---|---|
| Republican | Patrick Gallivan (incumbent) | 99,469 | 58.7 |
| Total votes | | 99,469 | 100.0 |
| Republican hold | | | |

== District 60 ==
New York's 60th State Senate district election, 2012
| Party | Candidate | Votes | % |
|---|---|---|---|
| Republican | Mark Grisanti (incumbent) | 63,683 | 50.2 |
| Democratic | Michael L. Amodeo | 45,140 | 35.6 |
| Conservative | Charles M. Swanick | 15,027 | 11.8 |
| Working Families | Gregory L. Davis | 3,078 | 2.4 |
| Total votes | | 126,928 | 100.0 |
| Republican hold | | | |

== District 61 ==
New York's 61st State Senate district election, 2012
| Party | Candidate | Votes | % |
|---|---|---|---|
| Republican | Michael Ranzenhofer (incumbent) | 73,103 | 59.0 |
| Democratic | Justin M. Rooney | 50,889 | 41.0 |
| Total votes | | 123,992 | 100.0 |
| Republican hold | | | |

== District 62 ==
New York's 62nd State Senate district election, 2012
| Party | Candidate | Votes | % |
|---|---|---|---|
| Republican | George D. Maziarz (incumbent) | 69,359 | 61.4 |
| Democratic | Amy Hope Witryol | 42,508 | 37.6 |
| Green | Jonathon B. Benedict | 1,127 | 1.0 |
| Total votes | | 112,994 | 100.0 |
| Republican hold | | | |

== District 63 ==
New York's 63rd State Senate district election, 2012
| Party | Candidate | Votes | % |
|---|---|---|---|
| Democratic | Timothy M. Kennedy (incumbent) | 82,458 | 100.0 |
| Total votes | | 82,458 | 100.0 |
| Democratic hold | | | |
