= Calcaterra =

Calcaterra is an Italian surname. Notable people with the surname include:

- Alessandro Calcaterra (born 1975), Italian water polo player
- Armando Calcaterra (1912–1990), Uruguayan palaeontologist
- Enrico Calcaterra (1905–1994), Italian ice hockey player and executive
- Fabio Calcaterra (born 1965), Italian footballer and manager
- Fernando Calcaterra (born 1972), Argentine footballer
- Giorgio Calcaterra (born 1972), Italian ultramarathoner
- Giuseppe Calcaterra (born 1964), Italian cyclist
- Grant Calcaterra (born 1998), American football player
- Horacio Calcaterra (born 1989), Argentine footballer
- Joey Calcaterra (born 1998), American basketball player
- Regina Calcaterra (born 1966), American attorney
- Roberto Calcaterra (born 1972), Italian water polo player
- Washington Calcaterra (born 1950), Uruguayan footballer

== See also ==
- USS Calcaterra (DE-390), Edsall-class destroyer escort of the United States Navy
