= Andrew Russo (pianist) =

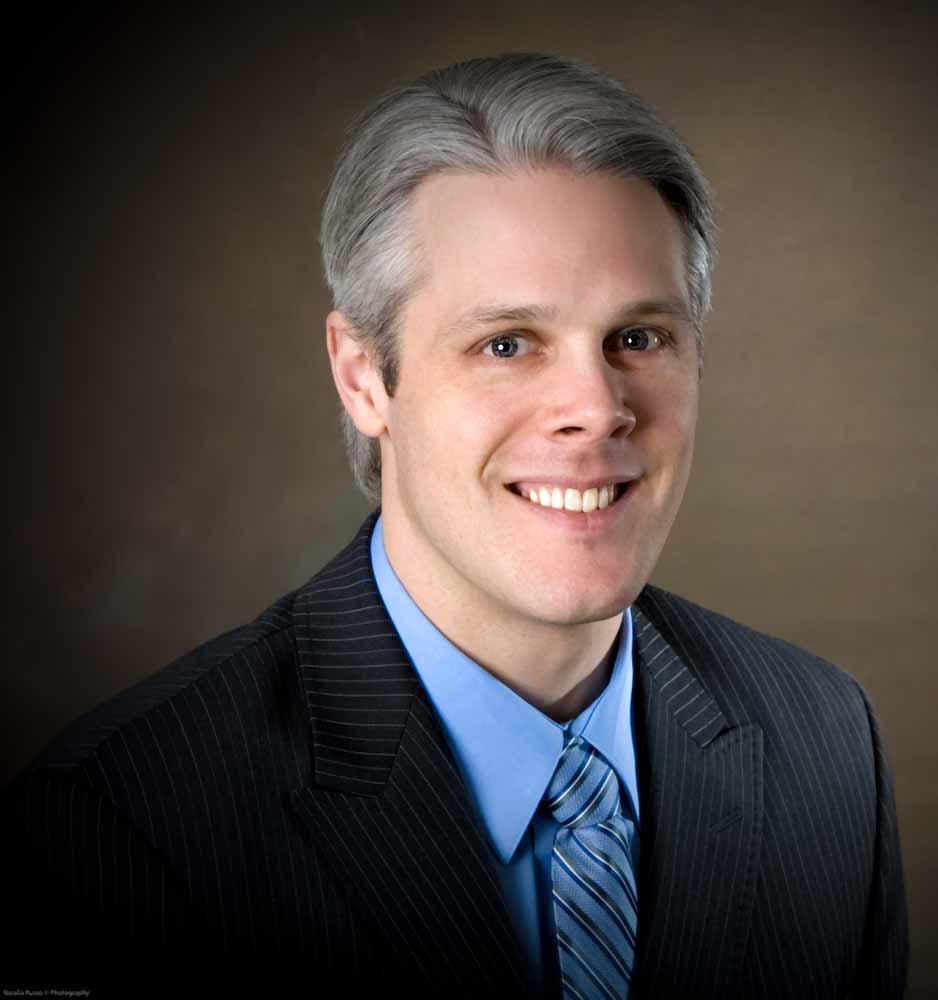

Background information
- Born: October 22, 1975 (age 51); Syracuse, New York
- Occupation: pianist
- Website: andrewrusso.net

Andrew C. Russo (born October 22, 1975) is an American pianist. Russo was born in Syracuse, New York, and studied music in New York City and Europe. He started a nonprofit youth educational foundation in New York at the age of 25 and recorded albums in the 2000s. In 2005, Russo became director of music at Le Moyne College, where he works as an artist in residence. He was an unsuccessful Republican candidate for the 49th New York State Senate district in the 2010 state election.

== Early life and career ==
Russo was born to a father of the same name who played baseball as a catcher for the Philadelphia Phillies. He is a native of Syracuse, New York, and graduated from Fayetteville-Manlius High School in 1993. Russo received his bachelor's and master's degrees from the Juilliard School in New York City and did post-graduate study in France and Germany. He participated in the Gina Bachauer International Piano Competition in 1998, returned to New York at the age of 25, and created Music Journeys Inc., a nonprofit youth educational foundation. Russo played in the Van Cliburn International Piano Competition in 2001, and released Voice of the Whale, an album of songs by composer George Crumb, for the British label Black Box Records in 2002.

Subsequent albums for Black Box, Corigliano: Violin Sonata; Etude Fantasy; Fantasia on an Ostinato; Chiaroscuro (2006), Aaron Jay Kernis: 100 Greatest Dance Hits (2007), Paul Schoenfield: Four Parables; Four Souvenirs; Café Music (2007), and Mix Tape (2008) received positive reviews by Allmusic. Russo's 2007 album Dirty Little Secret for Endeavour Classics was favorably reviewed by Allmusic and The New York Times.

== Politics ==
In November 2009, Russo announced his candidacy for the 49th New York State Senate district as a Republican in the 2010 state election. He had become a registered Republican on June 24, 2009 and was previously registered as a Democrat from 1995 to 2006, when he changed his registration to independent. The 49th Senate district is represented since 2005 by Democrat David Valesky. Russo named as his goals the implementation of term limits, the reduction of taxes, a spending freeze, and the removal of discretionary spending by individual senators. Russo attacked Valesky over his support for same-sex marriage and for "broken promises", "painful tax hikes", and "failed leadership". In December 2009, The Post-Standard reported that Russo had rarely voted since registering in 2001. Russo maintained he had voted in 2006 and 2008, and had failed to vote more often because he had lived outside of the country. Michael Long, chairman of the Conservative Party of New York State, stated on March 3, 2010, that Russo would be the Conservative Party candidate over of his Republican contender, East Syracuse mayor Danny Liedka. In May 2010, the Senate Republican Campaign Committee endorsed Russo over Liedka for the primary election.

Russo won the primary election on September 14 and became the Republican and Conservative candidate. Russo sought to run on the Taxpayers Party of New York ballot line but New York State Board of Elections spokesman John Conklin stated on September 10, 2010, that too many of Russo's collected signatures were determined to be invalid for him to receive the line. Valesky's campaign staff criticized Russo afterwards for having "no clue who is in this senate district".

In the general election, Valesky had a lead in early October in fundraising and opinion polling. Russo's campaign sought to portrait Valesky as a professional politician dependent on his party leadership and Valesky's campaign played up Russo's incomplete voting record and absence from the state. Russo's campaign publicly demanded Valesky return donation from Democratic State Senate leaders, whose names were included in a government report alleging unethical business dealings. Valesky's campaign in turn requested Russo return donations originating in the Seneca Nation of New York, which is suing New York over taxes on reservations. The candidates and their parties committed about two million dollars combined to the election, because the election could decide what party wins a majority in the New York State Senate. The Post-Standard on November 2, 2010, predicted the election to be close. Russo lost to Valesky.

== Personal life ==
Russo lives in Fayetteville, New York. He is married to Natalia Chepurnova.
