= Martin S. Auer =

American businessman and politician

Member of the New York State Senate
- In office January 1, 1973 – December 31, 1984
- Preceded by: Theodore D. Day
- Succeeded by: Nancy Hoffmann
- Constituency: 49th district (1973-1982); 48th district (1983-1984)

Personal details
- Born: July 21, 1918 Syracuse, New York, U.S.
- Died: May 21, 1991 (aged 72) Syracuse, New York, U.S.
- Party: Republican

Martin Swift Auer (July 21, 1918 – May 21, 1991) was an American businessman and politician from New York.

== Life ==
Auer was born on July 21, 1918, in Syracuse, New York to Harriet Swift Auer (1888-1948) and Onondaga County Sheriff Edwin Rugby Auer (1882-1965). He graduated from Syracuse University and from the Army Finance School of Duke University. He served in the U.S. Army during World War II as a Paymaster in the Pacific Theatre, reaching the rank of captain. Afterwards he took over the family business, Auer & Company, a candy and tobacco wholesaler in Syracuse. He married Wilma Tucker (1918–1991), and they had three children, Martin Tucker (b. 1948) Michael (b. 1950) and Virginia (b. 1954).

He entered politics as a Republican, and was City Auditor of Syracuse; and a member of the Board of Supervisors of Onondaga County (Syracuse, 18th Ward).

He was a member of the New York State Senate from 1973 to 1984, sitting in the 180th, 181st, 182nd, 183rd, 184th and 185th New York State Legislatures.

On February 16, 1979, he and some other local Republican bosses were indicted for demanding campaign contributions from insurance agencies who wanted to do business with the county administration. Later it was also charged that the Republican bosses asked county employees to hand over part of their wages to the party. On February 19, 1980, Auer was convicted of conspiracy on the latter charge. On November 4, he was re-elected to the State Senate. On January 12, 1981, he pleaded guilty to having been involved in the insurance agency shake-down. As part of a plea-bargain, his crime was classified as combination in restraint of trade, which is a misdemeanor and not a felony, and thus was able to retain his Senate seat.

In November 1984, he ran again for re-election, but was defeated by Democrat Nancy Larraine Hoffmann.

Auer died on May 21, 1991, in Syracuse University Hospital in Syracuse, New York, of a heart attack; and was buried at the Oakwood Cemetery there.

New York State Senate
Preceded by Theodore D. Day	New York State Senate; 49th District; 1973–1982	Succeeded by Tarky Lombardi, Jr.
Preceded by Charles D. Cook	New York State Senate; 48th District; 1983–1984	Succeeded by Nancy Larraine Hoffmann
