= James S. Alesi =

American politician

James Alesi
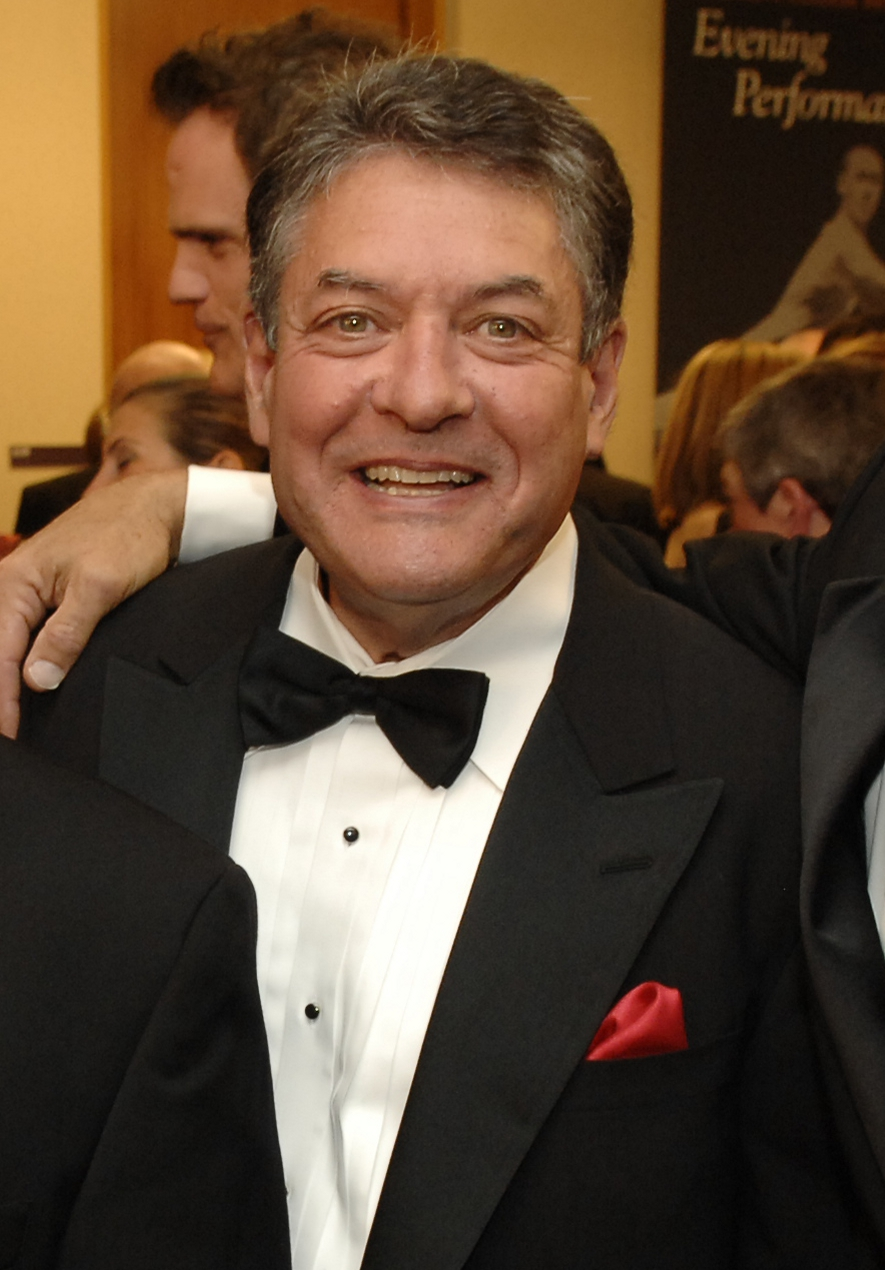
- Alesi in 2009

Member of the New York State Senate from the 55th district
- In office 1996–2012
- Preceded by: Mary Ellen Jones
- Succeeded by: Ted O'Brien

Personal details
- Born: February 23, 1948 (age 78)
- Party: Republican

James S. "Jim" Alesi (born 1948) is a retired politician who served as New York State Senator for the 55th district, representing parts of Monroe County from 1997 to 2012. A Republican, Alesi previously served in the Monroe County Legislature and in the New York State Assembly. Following his 2012 retirement from the Senate, Alesi has served on the state's Unemployment Insurance Appeal Board and on the Public Service Commission.

Alesi is notable as one of four Republican members of the New York State Senate that voted in favor of the Marriage Equality Act in 2011.

== Early life ==
Before entering office, Alesi ran a firm that operated washers and dryers in apartment complexes and colleges.

== Political career ==
Alesi began his political career as the Republican Deputy Town Leader for Perinton, New York. In 1977 he made an unsuccessful bid for a seat in the Monroe County Legislature against Louise Slaughter. He won on his second attempt twelve years later (Ms. Slaughter had left to take a seat in the New York State Assembly and later a seat in the U.S. House of Representatives). In 1992, Alesi was elected to the New York State Assembly, where his colleagues named him President of his class of freshman legislators. He was elected to the New York State Senate in a special election in 1996, and was re-elected every two years until his retirement in 2012.

In January 2008, Alesi illegally entered an unfinished Perinton home, claiming he believed the house was for sale, and broke his leg while climbing a ladder. The front door was locked, but Alesi managed to gain entry through an unlocked back door. He did not have permission from either the builder or the homeowners to enter the house. The owners and builder declined to press charges for trespassing. On January 18, 2011, the same day the statute of limitations for any potential trespassing charges expired, Alesi filed a lawsuit against the owners and the builder alleging an unsafe environment at the home site. After criticism from members of the public and other Republicans, Alesi withdrew the lawsuit.

Alesi is known for passing a resolution commemorating the March Days, legislative resolution J3784-2011 proclaiming March 31, 2012, as the Azerbaijani Remembrance Day and describing the March Days as the genocide "committed by the members of Armenian Dashnak party in concert with Bolsheviks against Azerbaijanis".

=== Position on same-sex marriage ===
In 2009, Alesi voted 'no' on same-sex marriage legislation despite being considered the Republican most likely to support the legislation. He is seen on video from the New York Senate floor casting his no vote with his head in his hands, and later admitted that he struggled with his decision to vote against the legislation.

In 2011, Alesi became the first Republican to announce his support for a new same-sex marriage bill. On June 24, 2011, Alesi was one of four Republicans to vote in favor of the Marriage Equality Act, stating: "I swore with my hand on the Bible to uphold the Constitution ... I didn't swear with my hand on the Constitution to uphold the Bible".

On May 9, 2012, Alesi announced that he would not run for re-election to the State Senate. Alesi stated that many factors, including the welfare of the Republican Party, led to his decision. Sen. Alesi indicated that Senate Majority Leader Dean Skelos had been supportive of his re-election. Prior to Sen. Alesi's announcement, Republican Assemblyman Sean Hanna had expressed interest in running a primary challenge against Sen. Alesi. On the same day that Sen. Alesi announced his decision not to run for re-election, the New York Daily News reported the following:

Sen. James Alesi (R-Rochester) told the New York Daily News Wednesday night that he believes his vote in favor of the landmark gay marriage legislation would have severely hampered his chances in a GOP primary this year. He said the vote — which passed 33-29 due to the GOP defectors — cost him the support of the leadership of the local Republican and Conservative parties. They are now backing his primary opponent ... Believing that his political brand was weakened by the gay marriage vote, Alesi said he decided to step aside out of fear that a bruising primary would eventually cost the GOP his seat — and with it potentially the party's razor-thin Senate majority. His political future was also clouded, however, when he sued a couple after he broke his leg while breaking into their home, which was under construction. He wound up dropping the suit, but the political exposure from an incident in which he was trespassing was anything but favorable.

== Post-Senate career ==
In 2013, Governor Andrew Cuomo appointed Alesi to a $90,000-per-year post on the Unemployment Insurance Appeal Board.

On June 19, 2017, the Daily News reported that Gov. Cuomo was "set to nominate to the state Public Service Commission that oversees New York's utilities a former state Republican senator who helped him pass gay marriage into law into 2011." The Daily News identified Alesi as the potential nominee. Alesi was confirmed by the Senate shortly thereafter. The Public Service Commission post paid $109,800 per year.

== See also ==
- 2009 New York State Senate leadership crisis

Political offices
Preceded by John D. Bouchard	Monroe County Legislator, 11th district January 1, 1990 – December 31, 1992	Succeeded by Pieter W. Smeenk
New York State Assembly
Preceded by James F. Nagle	New York State Assembly, 135th district 1993–1996	Succeeded by David Koon
New York State Senate
Preceded by Mary Ellen Jones	New York State Senate, 55th district 1996 – December 31, 2012	Succeeded by Ted O'Brien
Preceded by William Stachowski	Chairman of the Senate Committee on Commerce Economic Development and Small Business; 2011 – July 2012	Succeeded by Patrick M. Gallivan
