= Darrel Aubertine =

American politician

Member of the New York Senate from the 48th district
- In office February 2008 – December 2010
- Preceded by: James W. Wright
- Succeeded by: Patty Ritchie

Member of the New York State Assembly from the 118th district
- In office 2003–2008
- Preceded by: William Sanford
- Succeeded by: Addie Jenne Russell

Personal details
- Born: June 3, 1953 (age 73) Cape Vincent, New York, U.S.
- Party: Democratic
- Spouse: Margaret
- Children: 3
- Profession: Farmer, politician

Darrel J. Aubertine (born June 3, 1953) is an American politician and farmer from the State of New York. A Democrat, Aubertine served as Commissioner of the New York State Department of Agriculture and Markets from April 2011 to October 2013. He previously represented New York's 48th State Senate district from February 2008 to December 2010 and represented New York's 118th State Assembly district from 2003 to 2008. Aubertine has also held public office at the local level.

== Early life ==
Aubertine was born in Cape Vincent, New York, on June 3, 1953. He and his wife Margaret were married in 1977. They have three children: Erin, Paul, and Timothy. He is a farmer.

== Political career ==
Aubertine served on the Cape Vincent town council from 1994 to 1996. In 1996, he was elected to the Jefferson County legislature, where he served until 2002. In 2002, he was elected to the New York State Assembly representing the 118th district. He served in the Assembly from 2003 to 2008. The owner and operator of his farm in Cape Vincent, Aubertine gave up milking cows when he joined the Assembly, but remained an active crop and livestock farmer.

On February 26, 2008, Aubertine won an upset victory over William A. Barclay in a special election in the 48th district of the New York State Senate. Aubertine succeeded Republican James W. Wright, who retired from the Senate. Barclay's family's ownership of a stretch of the Salmon River became a campaign issue, as the family had charged local fishermen and anglers $30 for access that had previously been free. Aubertine carried significant crossover appeal among Republicans and independents, enabling him to win election in the most Republican district in the State Senate. Aubertine's victory brought the New York State Democrats within one vote of controlling the New York State Senate—and, thus, to controlling all three levels of state power (Democratic Gov. Eliot Spitzer was in office, and Democrats already controlled the State Assembly)---for the first time since 1935.

Soon after being elected in February 2008, Aubertine was successful in securing $250 million for improvements at State University of New York campuses in Oswego and Canton.

On June 22, 2008, the Watertown Daily Times cited unnamed sources in reporting that Gov. David Paterson's office had offered Aubertine a job heading the New York Power Authority. Later that day, the Senator confirmed that he had declined the offer. Two days later, the governor said that there had been a misunderstanding, though sources told the Times Union in Albany that the senator's version of the situation was accurate.

During his November 2008 Senate campaign, Aubertine was criticized for hiring his sister to his staff in violation of State ethics law, though he corrected the problem when notified of the conflict after just a few weeks on the job and later paid back the money she received.

On November 4, 2008, Aubertine defeated Watertown attorney David A. Renzi with 53% of the vote (52,908 to 46,941) to win re-election to a full term. In November, Aubertine's re-election along with the addition of two new Democratic Senators cleared the way for Senator Malcolm Smith to be named Majority Leader on January 8, 2009.

Aubertine was named chairman of the Senate's Agriculture Committee on January 7, 2009, replacing Republican Catharine Young. He was an anomaly in that he was a man chairing a committee traditionally led by women (Young, Patricia McGee, and Nancy Larraine Hoffmann before and Patty Ritchie after).

Aubertine was mentioned as a leading candidate to run for the House seat representing New York's 23rd congressional district, formerly held by Republican John M. McHugh, in 2009. He declined to run for Congress.

On December 2, 2009, Aubertine was one of eight Democratic state senators to vote against same-sex marriage legislation, which failed to pass the Senate.

Aubertine was defeated for re-election by Republican St. Lawrence County Clerk Patty Ritchie in November 2010.

== Commissioner of the Department of Agriculture and Markets ==
Governor Andrew Cuomo nominated Aubertine as Commissioner of the New York State Department of Agriculture and Markets on January 6, 2011. Aubertine was unanimously confirmed by the State Senate on April 5, 2011. Aubertine resigned the position in October 2013.

== Election results ==
- February 2008 special election, NYS Senate, 48th SD

Darrel Aubertine (DEM – WOR)	...	29,504
William A. Barclay (REP – IND – CON)	...	26,662

- November 2008 general election, NYS Senate, 48th SD

Darrel Aubertine (DEM – WOR)	...	52,908
David A. Renzi (REP – IND – CON)	...	46,942

- November 2010 general election, NYS Senate, 48th SD

Patricia A. Ritchie (REP – CON – TXP)	...	38,508
Darrel Aubertine (DEM – IND)	...	34,712

== See also ==
- 2009 New York State Senate leadership crisis

New York State Assembly
Preceded by William E. Sanford	Member from the 118th Assembly district 2003–2008	Succeeded by Addie Jenne Russell
New York State Senate
Preceded by James W. Wright	Member from the 48th Senate district 2008–2010	Succeeded by Patty Ritchie
Political offices
Preceded by Catharine Young	Chairman of the Senate Committee on Agriculture; 2009–2010	Succeeded by Patty Ritchie
Preceded by Kevin Parker	Chairman of the Senate Committee on Energy and Telecommunications; May 2009 – December 2009	Succeeded by George Maziarz
