= James W. Wright =

American politician (born 1949)

Member of the New York State Senate
- In office January 1, 1993 – December 31, 2007
- Preceded by: John M. McHugh
- Succeeded by: Darrel Aubertine
- Constituency: 46th district (1993-2002); 48th district (2003-2008)

Personal details
- Born: February 3, 1949 (age 77)
- Party: Republican

James W. Wright (born February 3, 1949) is an American politician and administrator who was executive director of the Development Authority of the North Country, a position he held for 11 years until his retirement in 2020. Previously he had been a member of the New York State Senate, representing the 48th district. This district includes Oswego and Jefferson counties, as well as part of St. Lawrence County.

Prior to his election, he had been county administrator for Oswego County and later Jefferson County. A Republican, he announced his retirement from elected office in December 2007, and was succeeded in a special election by Democrat Darrel Aubertine.

New York State Senate
Preceded by John M. McHugh	New York State Senate, 46th District; 1993–2002	Succeeded by Neil Breslin
Preceded by Nancy Larraine Hoffmann	New York State Senate, 48th District; 2003–2008	Succeeded by Darrel Aubertine
