= Rich Funke =

American journalist and politician

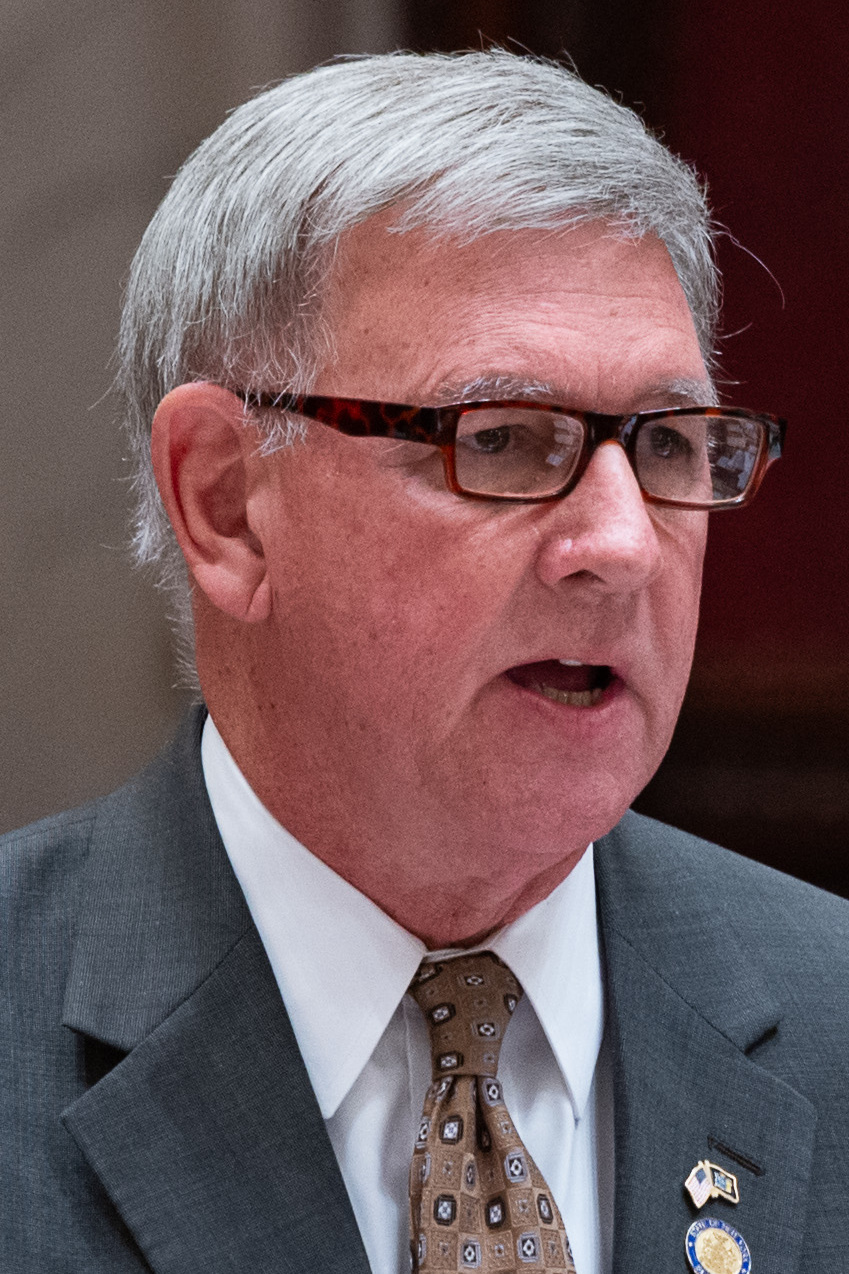
- Funke in 2019

Member of the New York State Senate from the 55th district
- In office January 1, 2015 – December 31, 2020
- Preceded by: Ted O'Brien
- Succeeded by: Samra Brouk

Personal details
- Born: January 30, 1949 (age 77) Batavia, New York, U.S.
- Party: Republican
- Education: Adelphi University
- Occupation: Newsreader, journalist, anchorman
- Website: Official website

Rich Funke (born January 30, 1949) is an American journalist and politician who represented the 55th district of the New York State Senate from 2015 until 2020.

Funke is a Republican who was elected in November 2014 when he defeated Democratic incumbent Ted O'Brien. Prior to his election, Funke had for almost 40 years been a news anchor and sports director for WHEC-TV, the NBC affiliate station in Rochester, New York.

== Media career ==
Funke is a former radio disk jockey, radio and television journalist and television sports reporter and news anchor in Rochester, NY. He began his career in broadcasting at WBTA in Batavia, New York. From there he worked as a news reader and reporter at WHAM in Rochester before moving in 1972 to WAXC a top 40 station as its news director. After WAXC he was brought on as a sports director at WHEC-TV in 1974. After a stint at WTVJ-TV in Miami, Florida from 1980 to 1981 he returned to Rochester and his previous position at WHEC-TV.

In 2005, Funke became the primary anchor of the evening news at 5, 6, 7 and 11 p.m. at WHEC-TV before retiring in 2012 as one of the main faces of the station.

== Political career ==
In March 2014, Funke announced his candidacy for the New York State Senate in Senate District 55 against incumbent Democrat Ted O'Brien. Funke defeated O'Brien, 54,874 votes to 38,624.

Funke ran for re-election unopposed in 2016. In 2018, however, he was a top Democratic target, ultimately defeating Democrat Jen Lunsford by a margin of 52%-48%.

In December 2019, Funke announced that he would not seek re-election the following year.

== Awards and honors ==
Funke received the James H. Ellery Memorial Award for Television for his coverage of the Rochester Americans in 1977 and 1986.

Funke was inducted into the New York State Broadcasters Hall of Fame in December, 2012 shortly after his retirement.

On December 27, 2014, the Rochester Lancers of the Major Arena Soccer League inducted Funke into the Rochester Lancers Wall of Fame as one of Rochester's "soccer pioneers". Funke was the television play-by-play announcer for the original Rochester Lancers of the North American Soccer League.

New York State Senate
| Preceded by Ted O'Brien | New York State Senate, 55th District; January 1, 2015 – December 31, 2020 | Succeeded by Samra Brouk |
