= Samra Brouk =

American politician (born 1986)

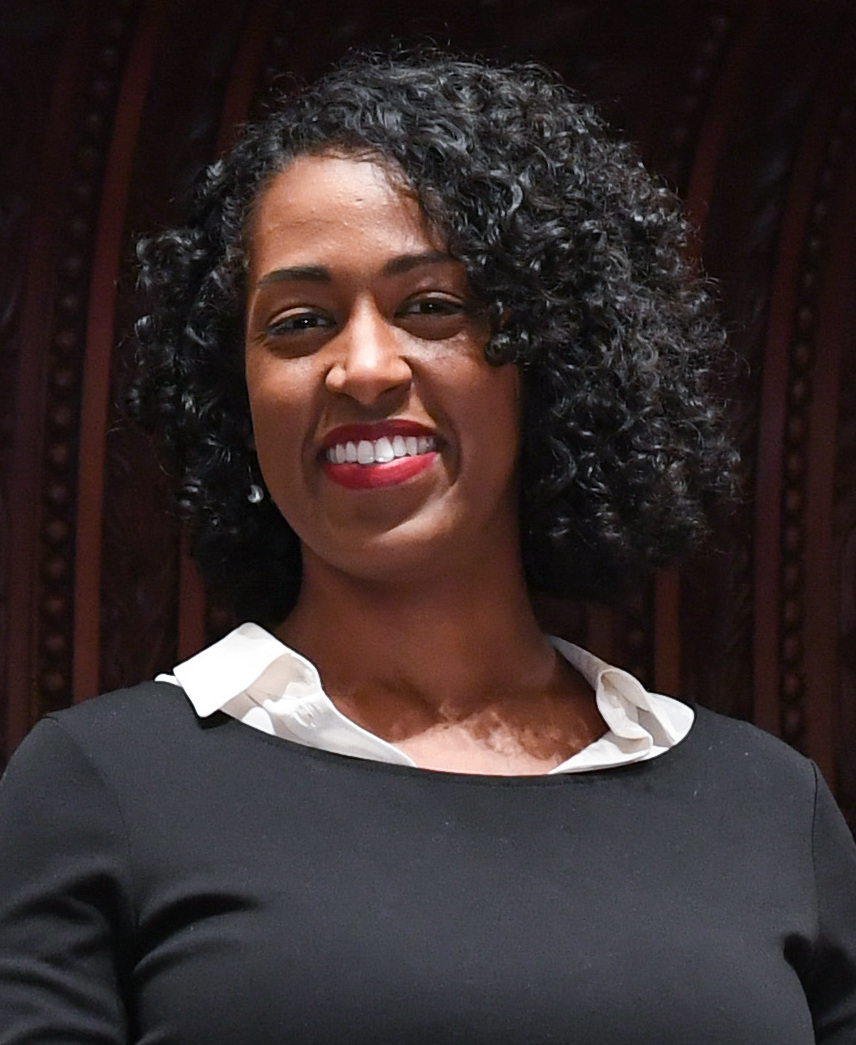

Member of the New York State Senate from the 55th district
- Incumbent
- Assumed office January 1, 2021
- Preceded by: Rich Funke

Personal details
- Born: May 20, 1986 (age 40) Rochester, New York, U.S.
- Party: Democratic
- Education: Williams College (B.A.)
- Website: Campaign website Official website

Samra Brouk (born May 20, 1986) is an American politician from the state of New York. A Democrat, Brouk has represented the 55th district of the New York State Senate, which is based in Rochester and its eastern suburbs, since January 2021.

== Early career ==
The daughter of Ethiopian immigrants, Brouk was born and raised in Rochester and nearby Pittsford. After graduating from Williams College and serving in the Peace Corps, Brouk held jobs at non-profits including DoSomething and Chalkbeat.

== Political history ==
In November 2019, Brouk launched her campaign for the 55th district of the New York State Senate, running against Republican incumbent Rich Funke. A month later, however, Funke chose to retire rather than seek a fourth term. Brouk faced no opposition in the Democratic primary and won the general election over Republican Christopher Missick, winning 57% of the vote to his 42%, flipping the seat.

=== New York State Senate ===
Brouk is currently the chair of the Mental Health Committee, and she is a member of the Aging Committee, the Alcoholism and Substance Abuse Committee, the Education Committee, the Elections Committee, the Health Committee, and the Women's Issues Committee.

== Personal life ==
Brouk lives in Rochester with her husband, Brian.
