= Rob Ortt =

American politician (born 1979)

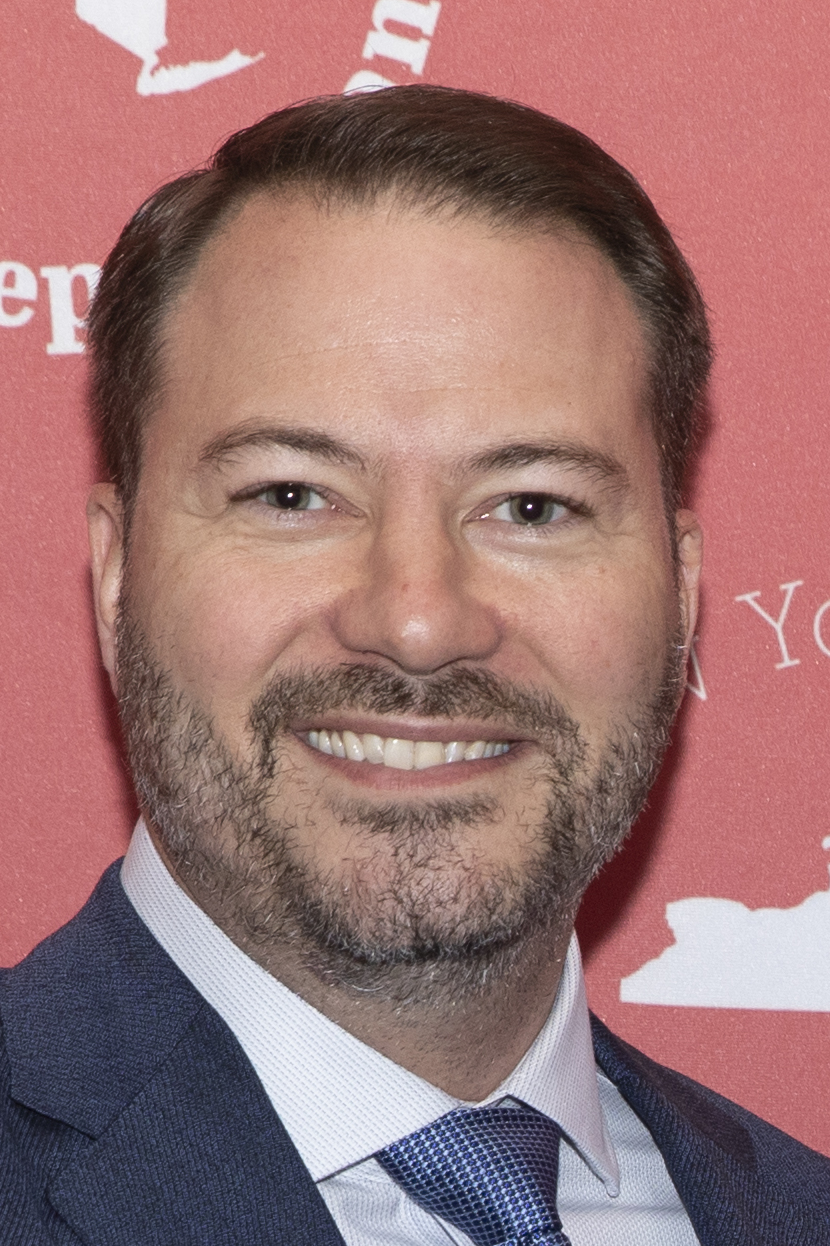
- Ortt in 2021

Minority Leader of the New York State Senate
- Incumbent
- Assumed office June 28, 2020
- Deputy: Andrew Lanza
- Preceded by: John J. Flanagan

Member of the New York Senate from the 62nd district
- Incumbent
- Assumed office January 1, 2015
- Preceded by: George Maziarz

Mayor of North Tonawanda
- In office January 1, 2010 – December 31, 2014
- Preceded by: Lawrence Soos
- Succeeded by: Arthur Pappas

Personal details
- Born: Robert Gary Ortt II; May 23, 1979 (age 47) North Tonawanda, New York, U.S.
- Party: Republican
- Spouse: Meghan Ortt
- Education: Canisius College (BA)

Military service
- Allegiance: United States
- Branch/service: United States Army
- Years of service: 2001–2009
- Rank: First Lieutenant
- Unit: New York Army National Guard
- Battles/wars: War in Afghanistan
- Awards: Bronze Star; Army Commendation Medal; Afghanistan Campaign Medal; Combat Infantryman Badge

Robert Gary Ortt II (born May 23, 1979) is an American politician and military veteran who has served as New York State Senate minority leader since 2020. Ortt represents the 62nd Senate district, which covers Niagara and Orleans counties. First elected to the Senate in 2014, Ortt is a Republican.

Prior to serving in the State Senate, Ortt served as city treasurer and as clerk-treasurer of North Tonawanda, New York. He later served as mayor of North Tonawanda from 2010 to 2014.

== Background ==
Ortt was born on May 23, 1979. He attended St. Joseph's Collegiate Institute in Buffalo and graduated from Canisius College, with a degree in international relations and political science. Ortt and his wife, Meghan, live in North Tonawanda.

== Military service ==
In October 2001, Ortt enlisted in the New York Army National Guard in response to the September 11 attacks. From March 2008 until December 2008, he served in the War in Afghanistan where his mission was to serve as a combat mentor/advisor to the Afghan National Police in Kandahar City, the second-largest city in Afghanistan. In recognition of his service, he was awarded the Bronze Star Medal, Army Commendation Medal, Afghanistan Campaign Medal, and the Combat Infantryman's Badge. He achieved the rank of first lieutenant.

== Early political career ==
On April 3, 2007, Ortt was appointed to the post of City Treasurer by the Common Council of North Tonawanda, New York. A few months later on November 6, 2007, he was elected to serve a four-year term, which began on January 1, 2008. On November 4, 2008, the town voted to eliminate the position of City Clerk and combined the offices of the City Clerk and City Treasurer to form one position of Clerk-Treasurer, making Ortt the first to hold that title.

From January 1, 2010 to December 31, 2014, Ortt served as mayor of North Tonawanda, taking over from Lawrence V. Soos, a Democrat. He was succeeded as mayor by Arthur G. Pappas.

== New York State Senate ==
In 2014, when George Maziarz opted not to run for reelection, Ortt ran for his seat, which Maziarz had held since 1995. The 62nd District covers all of Niagara and Orleans counties, as well as the towns of Sweden and Ogden in Monroe County. Ortt was elected to the New York State Senate, defeating Johnny G. Destino, a Democratic attorney from Niagara Falls.

In the Senate, Ortt was named chairman of the Standing Committee on Mental Health and Developmental Disabilities as well as co-chair of the Senate's Joint Task Force on Heroin and Opioid Addiction.

In May 2015, in the wake of Senate Majority Leader Dean Skelos's arrest on federal corruption charges, Ortt, along with two other Senate Republicans, called for Skelos to step down from his leadership post. Ortt also expressed support for a motion to replace Skelos as majority leader.

In July 2016, Ortt and New York Assemblyman Raymond Walter asked New York's comptroller, Thomas DiNapoli, to objectively investigate the state contracting process. Ortt and Walter requested that DiNapoli pay special attention to the Buffalo Billion, a large state investment into job creation in and around Buffalo, New York.

=== Positions ===
As a candidate for the Senate in 2014, Ortt indicated that he opposes abortion except in cases of rape or incest. He expressed strong support for the nine non-abortion-related pieces of then-Governor Andrew Cuomo's women's equality legislation, including "tougher equal-pay laws and laws to combat sexual harassment, domestic violence, and human trafficking".

In 2017, Ortt introduced legislation that would cause the 2013 gun control law known as the NY SAFE Act to be repealed in all areas of New York other than New York City.

In 2018, Ortt helped pass legislation he sponsored that added geothermal heating systems to the list of financeable heating systems in New York State.

Also in 2019, Ortt voted against the following bills that became law:

- The Reproductive Health Act, an abortion rights bill;
- The New York State Climate Leadership and Community Protection Act;
- The Driver's License Access and Privacy Act (also known as the Green Light Bill), which made driver licenses available to undocumented immigrants; and
- The Jose Peralta New York State DREAM Act, which gave undocumented students the opportunity to receive state-funded financial aid for college.

=== Corruption charges ===
On March 22, 2017, Ortt, along with his predecessor George Maziarz, was indicted by a grand jury on corruption charges. Ortt was charged with three counts of offering a false instrument for filing; he pleaded not guilty. Prosecutors alleged that Republican officials had approached Ortt about running for mayor of North Tonawanda in 2009. However, taking that position would have reportedly involved a $5,000 pay cut for Ortt. According to prosecutors, Synor Marketing, a public relations firm, created a no-show job for Ortt's wife, Meghan; the Niagara County Republican Committee allegedly paid $21,500 to Synor that was to be paid to Meghan Ortt.

==== Dismissal ====
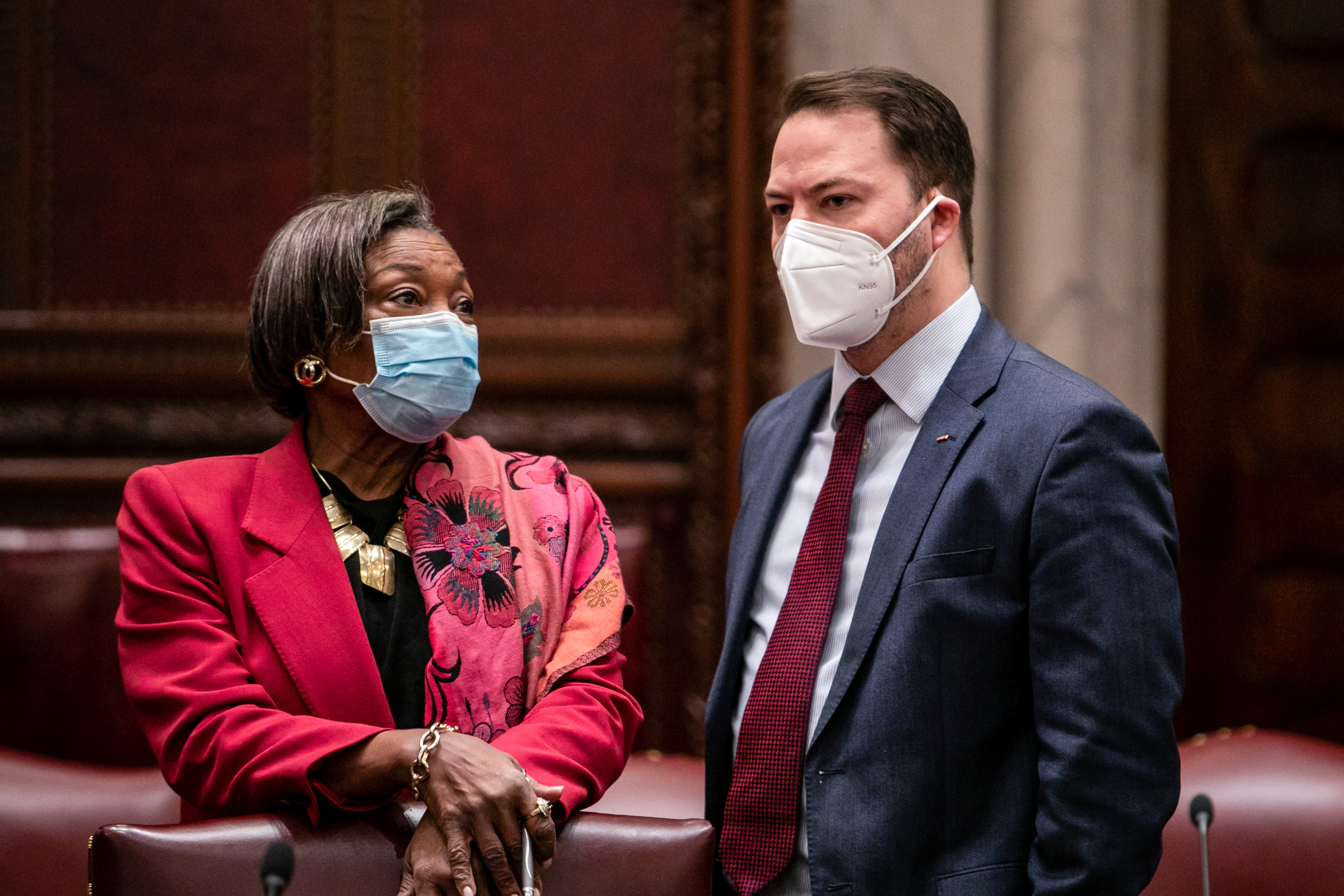
Senator Ortt speaking with Senate Majority Leader Andrea Stewart-Cousins in 2022

On June 27, 2017, all charges against Ortt were dismissed by Judge Peter A. Lynch. Judge Lynch ruled that there was no evidence that Ortt had known that the Niagara County Republican Committee was the source of the payments made to Meghan Ortt. Lynch did not rule that then-New York State Attorney General Eric Schneiderman had prosecuted Ortt in bad faith or presented inaccurate evidence to the court.

=== Senate Minority Leader ===
Ortt was named Minority Leader of the New York Senate on June 19, 2020 after incumbent John J. Flanagan announced his resignation.

== Other political campaigns ==
On August 17, 2019, Ortt announced that he would seek the Republican nomination for the United States House of Representatives in New York's 27th congressional district. The incumbent representative in the district, Republican Chris Collins, was arrested on federal insider trading charges in 2018. Ortt did not receive the Republican nomination, and he ended his congressional campaign on February 11, 2020.

New York State Senate
Preceded by John J. Flanagan	Minority Leader of the New York Senate; 2020–present	Incumbent
