= New York's 62nd State Senate district =

American legislative district

Senator
Rob Ortt; R–North Tonawanda
- Registration: 35.4% Democratic; 35.2% Republican; 20.2% No party preference
- Demographics: 86% White; 6% Black; 3% Hispanic; 1% Asian; 1% Native American
- Population (2017): 288,669
- Registered voters: 187,436

New York's 62nd State Senate district is one of 63 districts in the New York State Senate. It has been represented by Republican Rob Ortt, currently the Senate Minority Leader, since 2015.

== Geography ==
District 62 covers all of Niagara and Orleans Counties, including the city of Niagara Falls, as well as the towns of Sweden and Ogden in Monroe County.

The district overlaps with New York's 24th, 25th, and 26th congressional districts, and with the 134th, 139th, 140th, 144th, 145th, and 146th districts of the New York State Assembly.

== Recent election results ==
=== 2026 ===
2026 New York State Senate election, District 62
Party	Candidate	Votes	%
Republican	Rob Ortt		
Conservative	Rob Ortt		
Total	Rob Ortt (incumbent)		
Democratic	Thomas Arida		
Working Families	Thomas Arida		
Total	Thomas Arida		
Write-in			
Total votes			100.0

=== 2024 ===
2024 New York State Senate election, District 62
Party	Candidate	Votes	%
Republican	Rob Ortt	93,822	
Conservative	Rob Ortt	19,922	
Total	Rob Ortt (incumbent)	113,744	99.4
Write-in		716	0.6
Total votes		114,460	100.0
Republican hold			

=== 2022 ===
2022 New York State Senate election, District 62
Party	Candidate	Votes	%
Republican	Rob Ortt	69,047	
Conservative	Rob Ortt	16,876	
Total	Rob Ortt (incumbent)	85,923	99.3
Write-in		593	0.7
Total votes		86,516	100.0
Republican hold			

=== 2020 ===
2020 New York State Senate election, District 62
Party	Candidate	Votes	%
Republican	Rob Ortt	77,308	
Conservative	Rob Ortt	13,478	
Independence	Rob Ortt	11,097	
Total	Rob Ortt (incumbent)	101,883	99.2
Write-in		802	0.8
Total votes		102,685	100.0
Republican hold			

=== 2018 ===
2018 New York State Senate election, District 62
Party	Candidate	Votes	%
Republican	Rob Ortt	54,154	
Conservative	Rob Ortt	9,804	
Independence	Rob Ortt	4,506	
Reform	Rob Ortt	654	
Total	Rob Ortt (incumbent)	69,118	86.6
Green	Peter Diachun	10,539	13.2
Write-in		131	0.2
Total votes		79,788	100.0
Republican hold			

=== 2016 ===
2016 New York State Senate election, District 62
Party	Candidate	Votes	%
Republican	Rob Ortt	67,228	
Conservative	Rob Ortt	12,761	
Independence	Rob Ortt	8,405	
Reform	Rob Ortt	996	
Total	Rob Ortt (incumbent)	89,390	99.6
Write-in		369	0.4
Total votes		89,759	100.0
Republican hold			

=== 2014 ===
2014 New York State Senate election, District 62
Primary election
Party	Candidate	Votes	%
Republican	Rob Ortt	5,645	78.0
Republican	Gia Arnold	1,589	22.0
Write-in		0	0.0
Total votes		7,234	100.0
Working Families	Paul Brown	59	59.6
Working Families	Johnny Destino	37	37.4
Write-in		3	3.0
Total votes		99	100.0
General election
Republican	Rob Ortt	35,914	
Conservative	Rob Ortt	8,998	
Independence	Rob Ortt	2,694	
Total	Rob Ortt	47,606	66.9
Democratic	Johnny Destino	21,678	30.5
Working Families	Paul Brown	1,840	2.6
Write-in		41	0.0
Total votes		71,165	100.0
Republican hold			

=== 2012 ===
2012 New York State Senate election, District 62
Primary election
Party	Candidate	Votes	%
Republican	George Maziarz (incumbent)	6,905	69.1
Republican	Johnny Destino	3,095	30.9
Write-in		0	0.0
Total votes		10,000	100.0
Working Families	Amy Witryol	100	72.5
Working Families	Timothy Moriarty	38	27.5
Write-in		0	0.0
Total votes		138	100.0
General election
Republican	George Maziarz	35,914	
Conservative	George Maziarz	8,998	
Independence	George Maziarz	2,694	
Total	George Maziarz (incumbent)	69,359	61.4
Democratic	Amy Witryol	35,914	
Working Families	Amy Witryol	8,998	
Total	Amy Witryol	42,508	37.6
Green	Jonathan Benedict	1,127	1.0
Write-in		47	0.0
Total votes		113,041	100.0
Republican hold			

=== Federal results in District 62 ===
Year	Office	Results
2020	President	Trump 55.4 – 42.4%
2016	President	Trump 57.9 – 37.2%
2012	President	Romney 50.6 – 47.6%
2012	Senate	Gillibrand 59.3 – 38.8%
