= George Maziarz =

American politician

George D. Maziarz

Member of the New York State Senate
- In office March 1995 – December 31, 2014
- Preceded by: John B. Daly
- Succeeded by: Robert Ortt
- Constituency: 61st district (1995-2002); 62nd district (2003-2014)

Personal details
- Born: May 25, 1953 (age 73) North Tonawanda, New York
- Party: Republican
- Spouse: Beverly Maziarz

George D. Maziarz (born May 25, 1953) is a Republican politician from New York State. From 1995 to 2015, Maziarz represented the 62nd District in the New York State Senate, which included all of Niagara County, all of Orleans County, and the towns of Sweden and Ogden in Monroe County. In March 2018, Maziarz pleaded guilty to a misdemeanor to avoid trial on five felony charges arising out of the alleged filing of false campaign finance reports.

== Biography ==
Maziarz is a native of North Tonawanda, New York, where he was educated in local schools, first at Ascension Academy and then at North Tonawanda High School, graduating in 1972. Four years later, he earned a Bachelor of Arts degree in history from Niagara University.

He was appointed City Clerk in his hometown of North Tonawanda in 1978 at the age of 25 and he became Niagara County, New York Clerk in 1989. Six years later, State Senator John Daly resigned his seat to become Commissioner of the New York State Department of Transportation, and Maziarz entered the State Senate after winning a special election.

He has served as President of the Chamber of Commerce of the Tonawandas, member of the Board of Directors of the United Way of the Tonawandas, member of the Corporate Advisory Board of DeGraff Memorial Hospital and Chairman of the popular Canal Festival of the Tonawandas. He is also a past officer and long-time member of Live Hose Co. #4, member of the Niagara County Volunteer Firemen’s Association, Knights of Columbus Council 2535, S.C.O.P.E. and the Niagara University Booster Club.

During the 2012 presidential election, Republican Mitt Romney chose George Maziarz as a Polish-American representative to support his campaign.

== New York State Senate ==
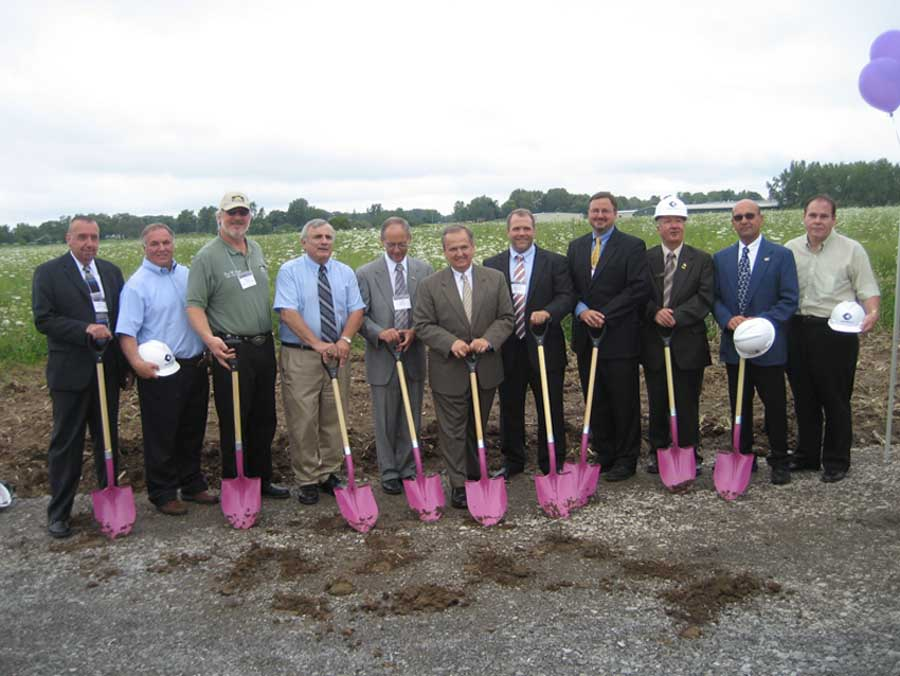
Senator Maziarz at the groundbreaking ceremony for Yahoo!, which he helped bring to Lockport, NY

Maziarz was first elected to the New York State Senate in 1995 and was a "power-broker" in Western New York Republican circles during his term in office. In January 1997, Maziarz was named Chairman of the Senate Aging Committee, a post which he held through the 2001-2002 session. At various points Maziarz served as chairman of the Tourism, Recreation, and Sports Development Committee, Labor Committee, and Energy and Telecommunications Committee; he was also a member of the Rules; Higher Education; Crime, Crime Victims, and Corrections; Environmental Conservation; and Transportation committees. He voted against same-sex marriage legislation on December 2, 2009; the bill was defeated. In 2011, Maziarz voted against a similar bill allowing same-sex marriage in New York, the Marriage Equality Act, which narrowly passed the Senate in a close 33-29 vote.

In July 2014, "amid reports that his office [was] under investigation by a federal prosecutor," Maziarz announced that he would not seek re-election to the Senate that fall.

== Corruption charges and guilty plea ==
In 2014, a team of investigators of the Moreland Commission to Investigate Public Corruption issued subpoenas that showed that "Maziarz's campaign had failed to disclose $147,000 in contributions and $325,000 in spending." A review of Maziarz's bank records showed "personal, nonpolitical expenditures" made from campaign accounts; from 2007 through 2013, investigators found that credit and debit cards associated with Maziarz's campaign funds were used to pay "$28,000 at stores like Pier 1 and Michaels; $7,500 at Shutterfly, the photo-printing site; and $7,850 for reading material, including a stop at a Borders store at Kennedy Airport."

In March 2017, Maziarz was charged with five felony counts of filing false campaign expenditure reports. The New York State Attorney General's Office charged that Maziarz had made the reports to illegally conceal $100,000 in payments to a former aide who had departed from his position amid accusations of sexual harassment. Maziarz pleaded not guilty.

On March 20, 2018, Maziarz pleaded guilty to a misdemeanor as part of a deal allowing him to avoid trial for five felony counts. Maziarz was fined $1,000 "after admitting to one count of offering a false instrument for filing as part of a scheme to cover up payments from his political campaign. "

New York State Senate
Preceded by John B. Daly	New York State Senate; 61st District; 1995–2002	Succeeded by Mary Lou Rath
Preceded by new district	New York State Senate; 62nd District; 2003–2014	Succeeded by Robert G. Ortt
Preceded by Olga A. Méndez	New York State Senate; Chairman of the Committee on Labor; 2005–2008	Succeeded by Joseph Robach
Preceded by James W. Wright	New York State Senate; Chairman of the Committee on Energy and Telecommunications; 2008	Succeeded by Kevin Parker
Preceded by Darrel Aubertine	New York State Senate; Chairman of the Committee on Energy and Telecommunications; January 2010–2014	Succeeded by ?
Preceded by David Valesky	Vice President Pro Tempore of the New York State Senate; 2011–2014	Succeeded by ?
