= Rachel May =

American academic and politician from New York State (born 1957)

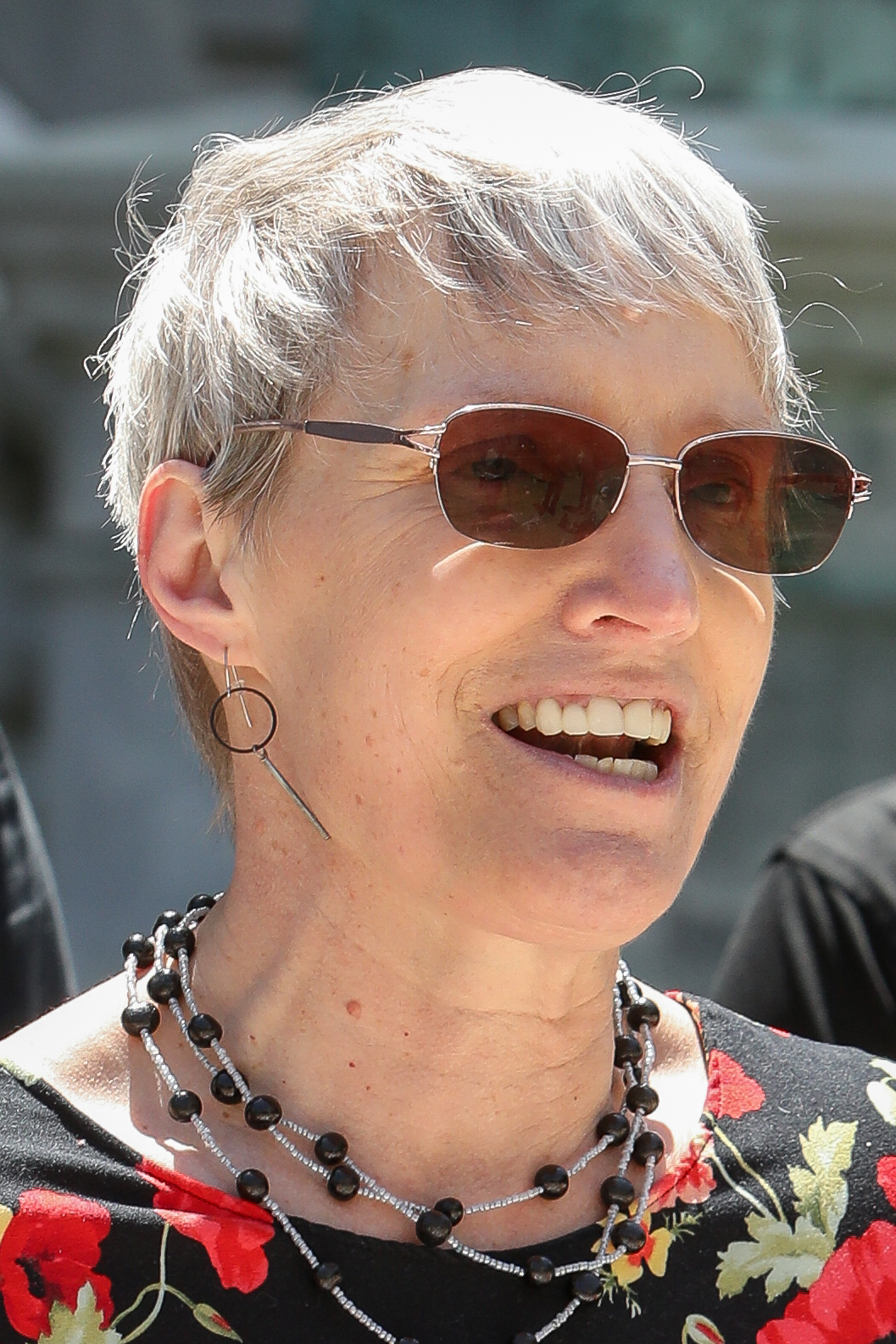

Member of the New York Senate from the 48th district
- Incumbent
- Assumed office January 1, 2019
- Preceded by: David Valesky
- Constituency: 53rd district (2019–2022); 48th district (2023–present)

Personal details
- Party: Democratic
- Education: Princeton University (A.B.); Oxford University (M.A.); Stanford University (Ph.D.); SUNY College of Environmental Science and Forestry (M.S.)
- Website: Official website www.rachelmayforsenate.org

Rachel May (born 1957) is an American academic, university administrator, and politician. She is a member of the New York State Senate, representing the 48th district since 2023, and the 53rd district from 2019‍–‍2022. The district comprises Syracuse, New York and surrounding communities. A Democrat, May defeated incumbent David Valesky in a 2018 primary election and was first elected to the State Senate in November 2018.

== Background ==
May was born in 1957 and is the daughter of the historian Ernest R. May. graduated with an A.B. in Slavic languages and literature from Princeton University in 1978 after completing a 99-page long senior thesis titled "Leisure Time and Its Functions in the Upbringing of New Soviet Men." She was awarded a Marshall Scholarship and graduated from the University of Oxford with a Master of Arts in 1981 before graduating from Stanford University with a Doctor of Philosophy in Slavic languages and Slavic literature in 1990. She taught at Stony Brook University in Stony Brook, New York and Macalester College in St. Paul, Minnesota as a tenured professor of Russian language and literature. In 2001, she and her former husband moved to Syracuse, New York, when he became a professor of philosophy at Le Moyne College.

After May and her family settled in Syracuse, New York, she graduated from the State University of New York College of Environmental Science and Forestry with a master's degree in environmental communications. She worked as an administrator at Syracuse University for fifteen years, first as the Director of the Office of Environment and Society and later as the Coordinator of Sustainability Education until her election to the New York State Senate.

Prior to her election to the Senate, May served on the Onondaga County Board of Zoning Appeals and the Democratic County Committee. She has an adult son.

== New York State Senate ==
Following the election of Donald Trump, voters became more aware of the Independent Democratic Conference, where state Senators elected as Democrats formed an alliance with Republicans to provide them with the Senate majority in return for better committee assignments and larger office budgets, among other benefits. Among the members of the IDC was David Valesky, who had represented the district since 2005.

In the 2018 elections, May ran for New York State Senate against Valesky in the Democratic primary. The election was the first serious challenge to Valesky since he took office. In a year with strong anti-IDC sentiment, May narrowly defeated Valesky. With the district leaning Democratic, she defeated Republican Janet Burman in the general election.

The Democrats took the Senate majority in the 2018 general election, and May was named Chair of Committee on Aging. She has been Chair of the Committee on Consumer Protection since 2025.

May and Senator Robert Jackson received criticism in March 2022 after attending a rally organized by NY Renews, where they posed with a sign that compared climate change to the September 11 attacks. The sign used imagery that depicted a plane flying into the World Trade Center, with "climate change" captioned over the plane. May apologized for the incident, though others (including Nick Langworthy and John Salka) argued her apology did not go far enough, and called on her to resign.

== Bibliography ==
- The Translator in the Text: On Reading Russian Literature in English (1994)
