= New York's 53rd State Senate district =

American legislative district

Senator
Joseph Griffo; R–Rome
- Registration: 41.1% Democratic; 26.4% Republican; 24.6% No party preference
- Demographics: 75% White; 13% Black; 5% Hispanic; 3% Asian; 1% Native American
- Population (2017): 287,434
- Registered voters: 179,529

New York's 53rd State Senate district is one of 63 districts in the New York State Senate. It has been represented by Republican Joseph Griffo since 2023.

== Geography ==
District 53 includes all of Oneida and Madison Counties and parts of Chenango, and Herkimer.

The district overlaps with New York's 19th and 22nd congressional districts, and with the 117th, 121st, 126th, 127th, 128th, and 129th districts of the New York State Assembly.

== Recent election results ==
=== 2026 ===
2026 New York State Senate election, District 53
Party	Candidate	Votes	%
Republican	Joseph Griffo		
Conservative	Joseph Griffo		
Total	Joseph Griffo (incumbent)		
Democratic	Mandi Drake		
Working Families	Mandi Drake		
Total	Mandi Drake		
Write-in			
Total votes			

=== 2024 ===
2024 New York State Senate election, District 53
Party	Candidate	Votes	%
Republican	Joseph Griffo	89,023	
Conservative	Joseph Griffo	10,436	
Total	Joseph Griffo (incumbent)	99,459	70.2
Democratic	James Meyers	38,285	
Working Families	James Meyers	3,921	
Total	James Meyers	42,206	29.8
Write-in		71	0.0
Total votes		141,736	100.0
Republican hold			

=== 2022 ===
2022 New York State Senate election, District 53
Party	Candidate	Votes	%
Republican	Joseph Griffo	73,709	
Conservative	Joseph Griffo	12,663	
Total	Joseph Griffo	86,372	99.3
Write-in		580	0.7
Total votes		86,952	100.0
Republican win (new boundaries)			

=== 2020 ===
2020 New York State Senate election, District 53
Party	Candidate	Votes	%
Democratic	Rachel May	61,697	
Working Families	Rachel May	5,002	
Total	Rachel May (incumbent)	66,699	54.8
Republican	Sam Rodgers	45,537	
Conservative	Sam Rodgers	6,075	
Independence	Sam Rodgers	2,084	
SAM	Sam Rodgers	102	
Total	Sam Rodgers	53,798	44.2
Libertarian	Russell Penner	1,246	1.0
Write-in		49	0.0
Total votes		121,792	100.0
Democratic hold			

=== 2018 ===
2018 New York State Senate election, District 53
Primary election
Party	Candidate	Votes	%
Democratic	Rachel May	8,553	51.8
Democratic	David Valesky (incumbent)	7,943	48.2
Write-in		0	0.0
Total votes		16,496	100.0
Women's Equality	David Valesky (incumbent)	2	66.6
Women's Equality	Zephyr Teachout	1	33.3
Write-in		0	0.0
Total votes		3	100.0
General election
Democratic	Rachel May	45,706	
Working Families	Rachel May	5,002	
Total	Rachel May	48,076	51.3
Republican	Janet Berl Burman	29,627	
Conservative	Janet Berl Burman	5,021	
Total	Janet Berl Burman	34,648	36.9
Independence	David Valesky	9,625	
Women's Equality	David Valesky	1,393	
Total	David Valesky (incumbent)	11,018	11.7
Write-in		68	0.1
Total votes		93,810	100.0
Democratic hold			

=== 2016 ===
2016 New York State Senate election, District 53
Party	Candidate	Votes	%
Democratic	David Valesky	68,854	
Independence	David Valesky	11,017	
Women's Equality	David Valesky	2,653	
Total	David Valesky (incumbent)	82,524	99.2
Write-in		658	0.8
Total votes		83,182	100.0
Democratic hold			

=== 2014 ===
2014 New York State Senate election, District 53
Party	Candidate	Votes	%
Democratic	David Valesky	41,789	
Independence	David Valesky	9,263	
Total	David Valesky (incumbent)	51,052	98.7
Write-in		659	1.3
Total votes		51,711	100.0
Democratic hold			

=== 2012 ===
2012 New York State Senate election, District 53
Party	Candidate	Votes	%
Democratic	David Valesky	68,897	
Independence	David Valesky	7,821	
Working Families	David Valesky	7,711	
Total	David Valesky (incumbent)	84,429	99.4
Write-in		507	0.6
Total votes		84,936	100.0
Democratic hold			

=== Federal results in District 53 ===
Year	Office	Results
2020	President	Biden 57.9 – 39.7%
2016	President	Clinton 54.3 – 39.8%
2012	President	Obama 62.3 – 35.8%
2012	Senate	Gillibrand 70.0 – 27.2%
