= Nancy Larraine Hoffmann =

American politician

Nancy L. Hoffmann

Member of the New York State Senate
- In office January 1, 1985 – December 31, 2004
- Preceded by: Martin S. Auer
- Succeeded by: David Valesky
- Constituency: 48th district (1985-2002); 49th district (2003-2004)

Personal details
- Born: September 22, 1947 (age 78) Needham, Massachusetts, U.S.
- Party: Republican

Nancy Larraine Hoffmann (born September 22, 1947, Needham, Massachusetts) is a Republican former New York State Senator from central New York.

== Career ==
Hoffmann was a member of the Syracuse, New York City Council. She was first elected to the New York State Senate in 1984 as a Democrat. In 1998, she became a Republican. She served in the New York State Senate from 1985 to 2004.

In 2004, Hoffmann was challenged in a Republican State Senate primary in District 49 by Tom Dadey. Hoffmann's support for abortion rights was controversial, and she had drawn conservative criticism for her support of budget legislation that raised income taxes and sales taxes. Republican committees in all four counties in Hoffmann's district withdrew their support from her. Hoffmann defeated Dadey in the Republican primary and then faced a general election battle with Oneida-based Democrat David J. Valesky and Dadey, who ran on the Conservative Party line and the Independence Party line. She lost to Valesky by 742 votes in the three-way race. Dadey, who received 13,234 votes, was blamed for Hoffmann's defeat by her supporters and by other Republicans.

In 2006, Hoffmann indicated that she would run for Lieutenant Governor that year. On May 19, 2006, however, she announced that she was dropping out of the race.

New York State Senate
Preceded by Martin S. Auer	New York State Senate; 48th District; 1985–2002	Succeeded by James W. Wright
Preceded by John A. DeFrancisco	New York State Senate; 49th District; 2003–2004	Succeeded by David J. Valesky
Preceded by ?	New York State Senate; Chairperson of the Committee on Agriculture; 1998–2004	Succeeded by Patricia McGee
