= New York's 55th State Senate district =

American legislative district

Senator
Samra Brouk; D–Rochester
- Registration: 40.3% Democratic; 28.7% Republican; 24.2% No party preference
- Demographics: 77% White; 10% Black; 8% Hispanic; 3% Asian
- Population (2017): 294,445
- Registered voters: 204,872

New York's 55th State Senate district is one of 63 districts in the New York State Senate. It has been represented by Democrat Samra Brouk since 2021, succeeding Republican Rich Funke.

== Geography ==
District 55 covers parts of Monroe and Ontario Counties, including the eastern half of Rochester and many of its eastern and northern suburbs.

The district overlaps with New York's 25th congressional district and with the 131st, 133rd, 135th, 136th, 137th, and 138th districts of the New York State Assembly.

== Recent election results ==
=== 2026 ===
2026 New York State Senate election, District 55
Party	Candidate	Votes	%
Democratic	Samra Brouk		
Working Families	Samra Brouk		
Total	Samra Brouk (incumbent)	83,257	66.56
Republican	Chris Brown		
Conservative	Chris Brown		
Total	Chris Brown	41,740	33.37
Write-in			
Total votes			

=== 2024 ===
2024 New York State Senate election, District 55
Party	Candidate	Votes	%
Democratic	Samra Brouk	89,485	
Working Families	Samra Brouk	8,255	
Total	Samra Brouk (incumbent)	97,740	61.6
Republican	Luis Martinez	52,531	
Conservative	Luis Martinez	8,449	
Total	Luis Martinez	60,980	38.4
Write-in		45	0.0
Total votes		158,765	100.0
Democratic hold			

=== 2022 ===
2022 New York State Senate election, District 55
Party	Candidate	Votes	%
Democratic	Samra Brouk	66,949	
Working Families	Samra Brouk	6,383	
Total	Samra Brouk (incumbent)	73,332	58.4
Republican	Len Morrell	43,199	
Conservative	Len Morrell	8,517	
Independence	Len Morrell	553	
Total	Len Morrell	52,269	41.6
Write-in		37	0.0
Total votes		125,638	100.0
Democratic win (new boundaries)			

=== 2020 ===
2020 New York State Senate election, District 55
Party	Candidate	Votes	%
Democratic	Samra Brouk	83,539	
Working Families	Samra Brouk	6,871	
Total	Samra Brouk	90,410	57.4
Republican	Christopher Missick	56,048	
Conservative	Christopher Missick	8,772	
Independence	Christopher Missick	2,122	
SAM	Christopher Missick	141	
Total	Christopher Missick	67,083	42.6
Write-in		57	0.0
Total votes		157,550	100.0
Democratic gain from Republican			

=== 2018 ===
2018 New York State Senate election, District 55
Party	Candidate	Votes	%
Republican	Rich Funke	54,429	
Conservative	Rich Funke	8,210	
Independence	Rich Funke	3,097	
Reform	Rich Funke	543	
Total	Rich Funke (incumbent)	66,279	51.9
Democratic	Jennifer Lunsford	61,407	48.1
Write-in		38	0.0
Total votes		127,724	100.0
Republican hold			

=== 2016 ===
2016 New York State Senate election, District 55
Party	Candidate	Votes	%
Republican	Rich Funke	75,856	
Independence	Rich Funke	12,403	
Conservative	Rich Funke	11,390	
Reform	Rich Funke	1,685	
Total	Rich Funke (incumbent)	101,334	98.9
Write-in		1,118	1.1
Total votes		102,452	100.0
Republican hold			

=== 2014 ===
2014 New York State Senate election, District 55
Party	Candidate	Votes	%
Republican	Rich Funke	43,270	
Conservative	Rich Funke	7,943	
Independence	Rich Funke	2,640	
Stop Common Core	Rich Funke	1,021	
Total	Rich Funke	54,874	58.6
Democratic	Ted O'Brien	34,777	
Working Families	Ted O'Brien	3,847	
Total	Ted O'Brien (incumbent)	38,624	41.3
Write-in		80	0.1
Total votes		93,578	100.0
Republican gain from Democratic			

=== 2012 ===
2012 New York State Senate election, District 55
Party	Candidate	Votes	%
Democratic	Ted O'Brien	64,973	
Working Families	Ted O'Brien	5,047	
Total	Ted O'Brien	70,020	52.0
Republican	Sean Hanna	53,643	
Conservative	Sean Hanna	8,133	
Independence	Sean Hanna	2,796	
Total	Sean Hanna	64,572	47.9
Write-in		130	0.1
Total votes		134,722	100.0
Democratic gain from Republican			

=== Federal results in District 55 ===
Year	Office	Results
2020	President	Biden 61.9 – 35.4%
2016	President	Clinton 56.3 – 37.8%
2012	President	Obama 56.5 – 41.5%
2012	Senate	Gillibrand 64.9 – 33.3%
