= Sean Hanna =

American politician (born 1961)

Sean T. Hanna

Member of the New York State Assembly from the 130th district
- In office January 1, 2011 – December 31, 2012
- Preceded by: Joseph Errigo
- Succeeded by: Bob Oaks

Personal details
- Born: December 31, 1961 (age 64) Rochester, New York
- Party: Republican
- Spouse: Marlene
- Children: two
- Profession: politician
- Website: Official website

Sean T. Hanna (born December 31, 1961) is an American politician who represented the 130th district in the New York State Assembly from 2011 to 2012. His district included portions of Livingston, Monroe and Ontario Counties.

Shortly after graduating law school, he joined the Monroe County District Attorney's Office, where he served as a felony trial prosecutor for six years.

In 1995, Hanna was elected to the Monroe County Legislature. His colleagues soon elected him Deputy Majority Leader. His eight-year tenure in the county legislature ended when then-Governor George Pataki made Hanna the Avon-based New York State Department of Environmental Conservation Regional Director for the 11 county area enveloping Rochester the Finger Lakes and Corning/Elmira.

Hanna announced in 2012 that he would not seek re-election for a second term in the Assembly, and instead would run for the New York State Senate's 55th district. He lost to Democrat Ted O'Brien in the 2012 general election.

Hanna served as a lead trial attorney for Monroe County Executive Maggie Brooks' administration before his election to the New York State Assembly. He earned his bachelor's degree in economics from Boston College, and his Juris Doctor degree from Wake Forest University School of Law.

He was the co-founder and co-owner of True North Packaging, Inc. in Webster, NY, and was the Chief Strategic Officer at All-American Home Care in Rochester, NY.

He resides with his wife and two children in Webster, New York where is he currently running for Webster Town Supervisor.

New York State Assembly
Preceded by Joseph Errigo	New York State Assembly, 130th District; January 1, 2011 – December 31, 2012	Succeeded by Bob Oaks
