= Ted O'Brien (American politician) =

American politician (born 1957)

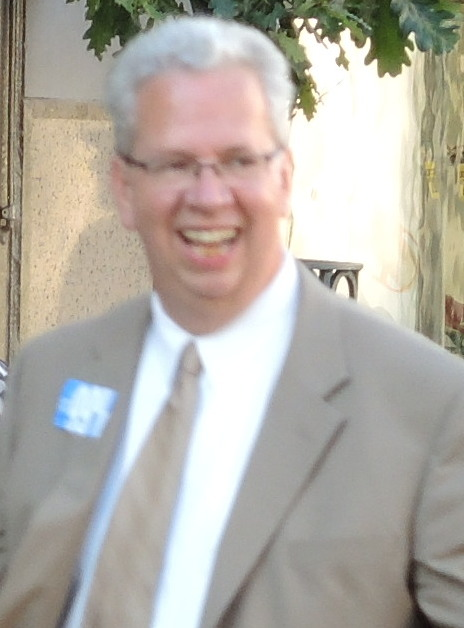

Member of the New York Senate from the 55th district
- In office January 1, 2013 – December 31, 2014
- Preceded by: James Alesi
- Succeeded by: Rich Funke

Personal details
- Born: Edward M. O'Brien
- Party: Democratic
- Education: Union College and Syracuse University
- Website: www.nysenate.gov/senator/ted-obrien

Edward M. O'Brien (born 1957) is an American politician who served in the New York State Senate in 2013 and 2014, representing District 55.

== Early career ==
O'Brien was raised in Webster, New York, and graduated from Webster Thomas High School in 1975, Union College in 1979, and Syracuse University College of Law in 1982.

He was admitted to the New York State Bar Association in 1983 and the U.S. Bankruptcy Court, Western District of New York in 1985. Early in his career he moved to Irondequoit, New York, where he still resides.

He briefly practiced in his family's firm before moving to a series of other law firms. He entered into partnership with other attorneys to form Harris, Chesworth, O'Brien, Johnstone & Welch, LLP in 1991.

== Political career ==
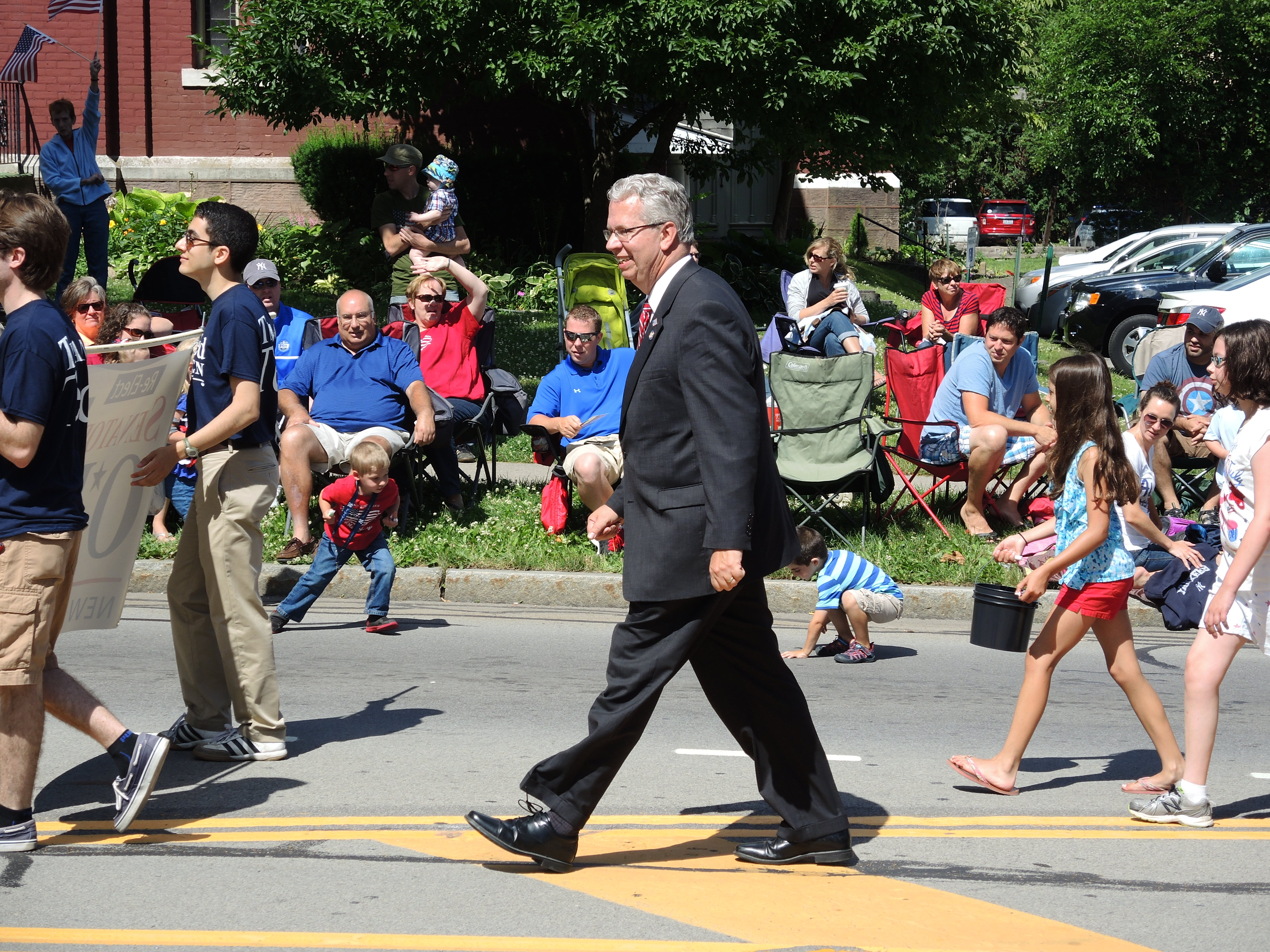

O'Brien began his political career as the chair of the Monroe County Democratic Committee. In 2004, he was appointed to fill the vacancy left by Jay Ricci in the Monroe County Legislature. He served two years as the minority leader there, starting in 2010.

In November 2012, he bested Sean Hanna for the state Senate seat left open by the retiring James Alesi.

O'Brien lost his Senate seat to the Republican and former WHEC-TV anchor Rich Funke in the 2014 general election.

In July 2015, O'Brien was appointed Assistant Attorney General In Charge of the Rochester Office of the New York State Attorney General.

Party political offices
Preceded by	Chairman of the Monroe County, New York Democratic Committee; 2000 – 2002	Succeeded by Molly Clifford
Preceded by Harry B. Bronson	Minority Leader, Monroe County, New York Legislature; 2010 – 2012	Succeeded by Carrie M. Andrews
Political offices
Preceded by Jay Ricci	Monroe County, New York Legislator, 17th District; November, 2004 – December 31, 2012	Vacant Title next held by Joseph D. Morelle, Jr.
New York State Senate
Preceded by James S. Alesi	New York State Senate, 55th District; January 1, 2013 – January 1, 2015	Succeeded by Rich Funke
