= Fernando Calcaterra =

Argentine footballer

Personal information
- Date of birth: 19 August 1972 (age 54)
- Place of birth: Casilda, Argentina
- Position: Forward

Senior career*
Years	Team	Apps	(Gls)
1992–1995	Newell's Old Boys	17	(1)
1995	Platense	14	(3)
1995–1996	O'Higgins		
1997	Caracas		
1997–1998	Deportivo Morón	4	(0)
1998	Deportivo Municipal		
1999–2000	Sport Boys		
2001–2003	Yucatán		
- * Club domestic league appearances and goals

Fernando Calcaterra (born 19 August 1972) is an Argentine former professional footballer who played as a forward, competing for clubs in Argentina, Chile, México, Peru and Venezuela.
