= Danny Liedka =

Danny J. Liedka is the current Onondaga County Legislator for the 7th district which includes the town of Dewitt and the Northside of the City of Syracuse, it also includes the Village of East Syracuse, New York, which Danny was mayor of until 2012.

Liedka was first elected to the Village of East Syracuse Board as a trustee in 2003, and was reelected in 2005. In 2007, he was elected mayor after being the first candidate in Village history to secure the endorsement of all three active political parties there. Danny is a senior sales executive at Marriott International and a sports broadcaster for Time Warner Cable SportsNet.

== Tenure in the County Legislature ==
Liedka was a sponsor of the bill that secured $50,000.00 in funding for the Veteran's Legal Clinic at Syracuse University and was instrumental in its passage.
