= Regina Calcaterra =

American lawyer (born 1966)

Regina M Calcaterra
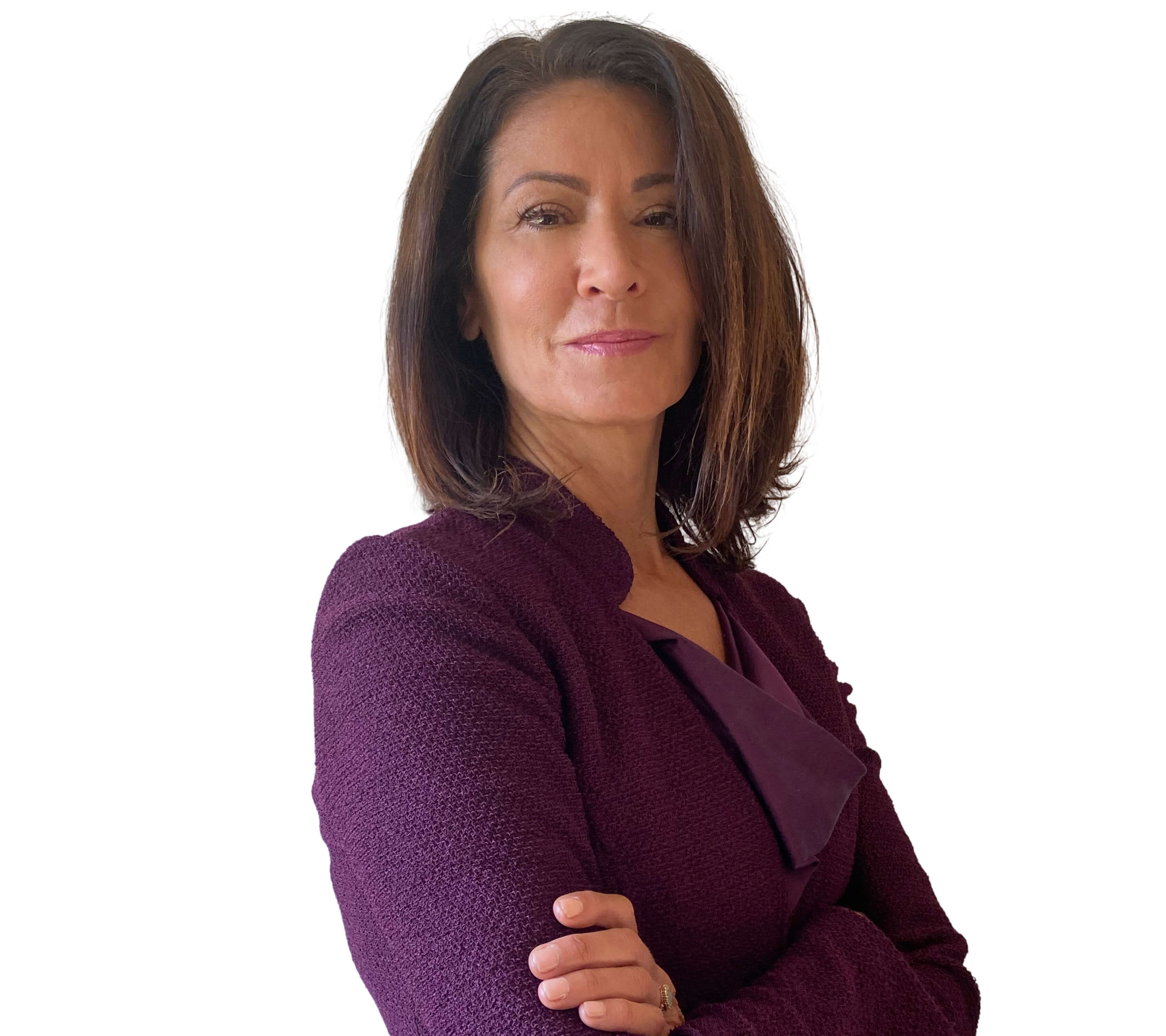
- Born: November 9, 1966 (age 60); New York
- Education: State University of New York at New Paltz (BA); Seton Hall University School of Law (JD)
- Occupations: Complex Litigation, state government executive
- Website: www.reginacalcaterra.com www.calcaterralaw.com

Regina Marie Calcaterra (born November 9, 1966) is an American attorney, founding partner of Calcaterra Law PC law firm, and a New York Times best-selling author. She served as Executive Director to two of New York State Governor Andrew Cuomo's investigatory commissions, Chief Deputy to Suffolk County Executive Steven Bellone, and Deputy General Counsel to both the New York State Insurance Fund and New York City Employees’ Retirement System.

== Early life and education ==
Raised in Lindenhurst, New York, Calcaterra spent her childhood in and out of foster homes and homelessness with her four siblings as chronicled in her #1 International Best-Seller memoir and New York Times Best-Seller Etched in Sand: A True Story of Five Siblings Who Survived an Unspeakable Childhood on Long Island, Harper Collins Publishing (2013).

Calcaterra was the plaintiff in the case In Re: the Parentage of Regina Marie Calcaterra, the first case of its kind in the United States that allowed an adult child to determine their true parentage via DNA paternity testing.

Calcaterra graduated from the State University of New York at New Paltz in 1988 and Seton Hall University School of Law in 1996.

== Government and public policy work ==
Calcaterra served as chief deputy to the Suffolk County executive. During her tenure, she managed the county’s fiscal crisis and oversaw the county’s day-to-day operations, including its response to and recovery from Hurricane Sandy.

In November 2012, Governor Andrew Cuomo appointed Calcaterra executive director of the newly convened Moreland Commission on Utility Storm Preparation and Response. The commission, authorized by the Moreland Act of the early 20th century, was constituted to investigate emergency management and preparedness following Hurricane Irene and Hurricane Sandy. The commission released two published reports, an interim report in January 2013 and a final report in June 2013. Both reports include the results of the commission's findings and policy recommendations, many of which were implemented to strengthen utility storm preparedness and response throughout the state.

From 2013 to 2014 Calcaterra was executive director of the Commission to Investigate Public Corruption. The commission was disbanded by the governor in March 2014, after the state legislature passed some of the Commissions recommendations in the annual budget. In August 2014, Governor Cuomo appointed Calcaterra deputy general counsel to the New York State Insurance Fund.

Calcaterra is a frequent commentator on policy and politics, appearing on CNBC, Newsday, and other media outlets.

== Publications ==
Calcaterra’s New York Times best seller Etched in Sand tells how she and her siblings survived an abusive childhood, the foster-care system, and intermittent homelessness.

She is the coauthor of Girl Unbroken: A Sister's Harrowing Journey from the Streets of Long Island to Farms of Idaho.
