= Patty Ritchie =

American politician (born 1962)

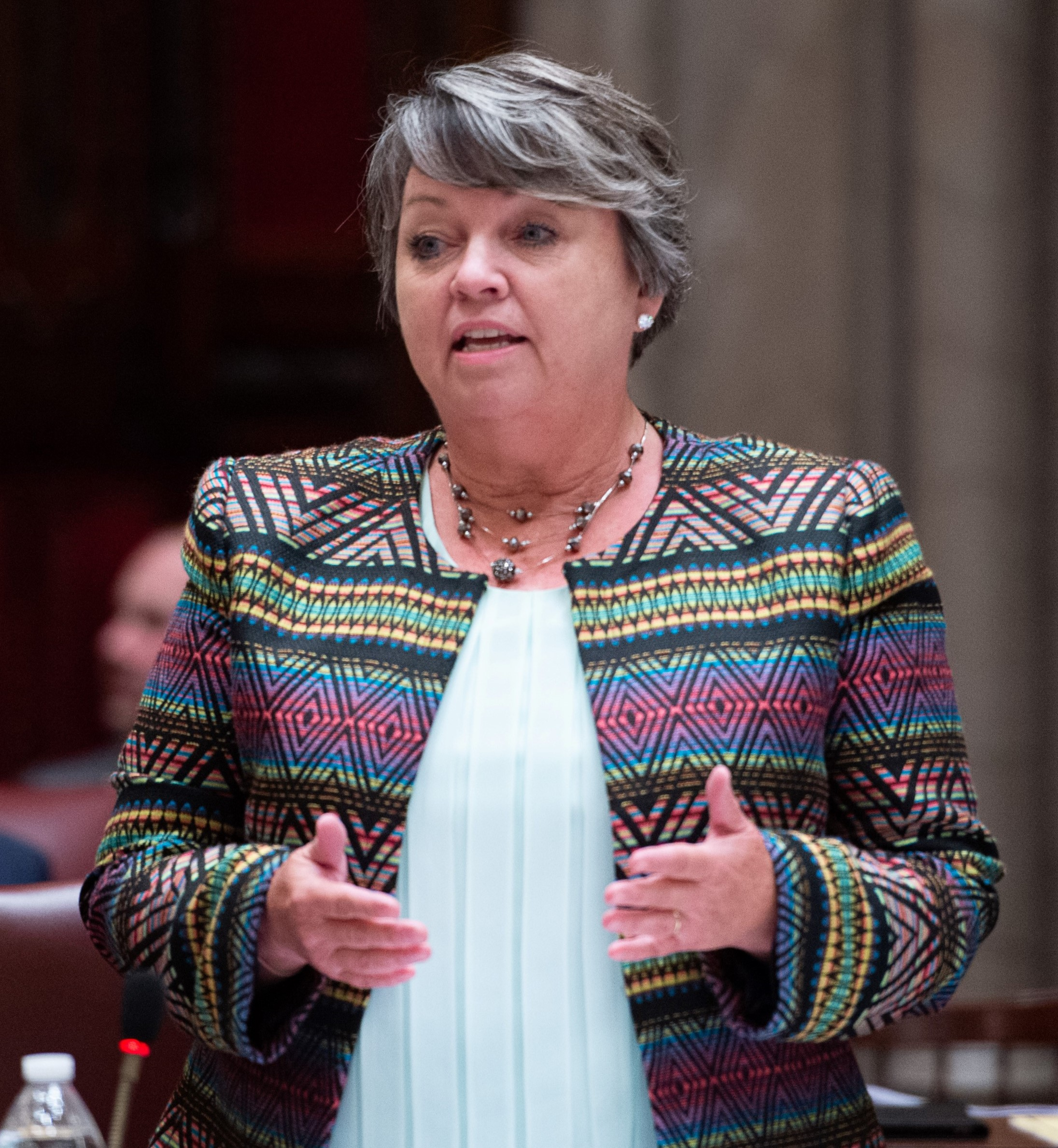
- Ritchie in 2019

Member of the New York State Senate from the 48th district
- In office January 1, 2011 – December 31, 2022
- Preceded by: Darrel Aubertine
- Succeeded by: Mark Walczyk

Personal details
- Born: February 22, 1962 (age 64) De Peyster, New York
- Party: Republican
- Spouse: Thomas P. Ritchie
- Children: three
- Education: SUNY Potsdam
- Website: Official website

Patricia A. Ritchie (born February 22, 1962) was a Republican member of the New York State Senate who represented the 48th district from 2011 to 2022. Her district encompassed portions of the North Country abutting Lake Ontario.

== Early life ==
Ritchie is a lifelong resident of Upstate New York. The daughter of Rita A. and Kenneth H. Hilborne, she was born and raised in DePeyster, New York. At 15, she moved with her parents and brother to town of Oswegatchie, New York. She graduated from Heuvelton Central High School in 1980.

She received an associates degree in social work from Mater Dei College of Ogdensburg, New York, in 1985. She briefly attended SUNY Plattsburgh, then transferred to SUNY Potsdam. She was married in 1982 and continued her education part-time while raising her family and working. Ritchie earned her bachelor's degree in psychology in 1991.

== Career ==
Ritchie worked for the Department of Motor Vehicles from 1986 to 1999. She was then elected as the St. Lawrence County Clerk, a position she held from 2000 through 2010. In 2002, she was the unsuccessful Republican candidate for New York State Assembly district 116, losing to Democrat Darrel Aubertine. In November 2010 she defeated Aubertine, this time for his seat in the State Senate. She was handily reelected in 2012, defeating a little known county legislator from Oswego County. She has run unopposed for reelection three times, in 2014, 2016 and 2018.

In 2011, Ritchie was named Chair of the Senate's Agriculture Committee, where she has been recognized as an outstanding champion of the state's 35,000 farm families and sponsored such initiatives as the Young Farmers Grant and loan forgiveness program. In 2016, Ritchie was named co-chair of the bi-cameral Legislative Commission on Rural Resources, and in 2017, was named Deputy Vice Chair of the important Health Committee, in recognition of her work to improve public health, especially in rural counties, like those she represents.

== Personal life ==
She and her husband Tom live in Oswegatchie. They have three grown children.

New York State Senate
Preceded by Darrel Aubertine	48th Senate district 2011–2022	Succeeded by Mark Walczyk
