= David Valesky =

American politician (born 1966)

Member of the New York State Senate
- In office January 1, 2005 – December 31, 2018
- Preceded by: Nancy Larraine Hoffmann
- Succeeded by: Rachel May
- Constituency: 49th district (2005–2012); 53rd district (2013–2018)

Personal details
- Party: Democratic
- Other political affiliations: Independent Democratic Conference (2011–2018)
- Education: State University of New York at Potsdam; University of Connecticut

David J. Valesky (b. circa 1966) is an American politician who is a former member of the New York State Senate. A Democrat, Valesky represented the 53rd Senate District and the 49th Senate District in upstate New York.

== Career ==
Valesky was first elected to the State Senate in 2004 when he defeated longtime incumbent Sen. Nancy Larraine Hoffmann (R-Fabius). Hoffman was challenged in a Republican primary by Tom Dadey. While Hoffmann defeated Dadey, Dadey remained in the race on third-party lines. Valesky prevailed in the three-way race. He took office as a state senator in January 2005.

In 2011, Valesky joined with Jeffrey D. Klein, Diane Savino, and David Carlucci to form the Independent Democratic Conference (IDC). On April 16, 2018, the IDC was dissolved and Valesky returned to the Senate Democratic Conference.

In the 2018 Democratic primary, Valesky was defeated by Rachel May. Valesky received 46.66% of the primary vote to May's 50.47%. All eight former members of the IDC faced progressive primary challenges in 2018, and six were defeated.

New York State Senate
Preceded by Nancy Larraine Hoffmann	New York State Senate, 49th District; 2005–2013	Succeeded by Hugh Farley
Preceded by Tom O'Mara	New York State Senate, 53rd District; 2013–2018	Succeeded by Rachel May
Political offices
Preceded by Frank Padavan	Vice President Pro Tempore of the Senate; 2009–2010	Succeeded by George Maziarz
Preceded by Martin Golden	Chairman of the Senate Committee on Aging; 2011–2013	Succeeded by Eric L. Adams
