= New York's 48th State Senate district =

American legislative district

Senator
Rachel May; D–Syracuse
- Registration: 41.3% Republican; 27.7% Democratic; 22.6% No party preference
- Demographics: 89% White; 3% Black; 4% Hispanic; 1% Asian
- Population (2017): 293,340
- Registered voters: 176,033

New York's 48th State Senate district is one of 63 districts in the New York State Senate. It has been represented by Democratic Rachel May since 2023.

== Geography ==
District 48 includes parts of Onondaga and Cayuga Counties. The city of Syracuse is located within the district.

The district overlaps with New York's 22nd and 24th congressional districts, and with the 116th, 117th, 118th, 120th, and 130th districts of the New York State Assembly.

== Recent election results ==
=== 2026 ===
2026 New York State Senate election, District 48
Party	Candidate	Votes	%
Democratic	Rachel May		
Working Families	Rachel May		
Total	Rachel May (incumbent)		
Republican	Richard McCarron Jr.		
Conservative	Richard McCarron Jr.		
Total	Richard McCarron Jr.		
Write-in			
Total votes			

=== 2024 ===
2024 New York State Senate election, District 48
Primary election
Party	Candidate	Votes	%
Republican	Caleb Slater	2,636	55.7
Republican	Fanny Patricia Villarreal	2,055	43.5
Write-in		39	0.8
Total votes		4,730	100.0
General election
Democratic	Rachel May	71,227	
Working Families	Rachel May	7,555	
Total	Rachel May (incumbent)	78,782	58.4
Republican	Caleb Slater	55,980	41.5
Write-in		144	0.1
Total votes		134,906	100.0
Democratic hold			

=== 2022 ===
2022 New York State Senate election, District 48
Primary election
Party	Candidate	Votes	%
Conservative	Justin Coretti	279	50.6
Conservative	Julie Abbott	265	48.1
Write-in		7	1.3
Total votes		551	100.0
General election
Democratic	Rachel May	46,968	
Working Families	Rachel May	3,700	
Total	Rachel May	50,668	50.3
Republican	Julie Abbott	42,894	42.5
Conservative	Justin Coretti	7,217	7.2
Write-in		43	0.0
Total votes		100,822	100.0
Democratic win (new boundaries)			

=== 2020 ===
2020 New York State Senate election, District 48
Party	Candidate	Votes	%
Republican	Patty Ritchie	80,176	
Conservative	Patty Ritchie	10,580	
Independence	Patty Ritchie	7,559	
Total	Patty Ritchie (incumbent)	98,311	99.3
Write-in		658	0.7
Total votes		98,969	100.0
Republican hold			

=== 2018 ===
2018 New York State Senate election, District 48
Party	Candidate	Votes	%
Republican	Patty Ritchie	55,917	
Independence	Patty Ritchie	7,144	
Conservative	Patty Ritchie	6,946	
Total	Patty Ritchie (incumbent)	70,007	99.4
Write-in		421	0.6
Total votes		70,428	100.0
Republican hold			

=== 2016 ===
2016 New York State Senate election, District 48
Party	Candidate	Votes	%
Republican	Patty Ritchie	69,196	
Conservative	Patty Ritchie	8,312	
Independence	Patty Ritchie	8,287	
Reform	Patty Ritchie	1,012	
Total	Patty Ritchie (incumbent)	86,807	99.6
Write-in		310	0.4
Total votes		87,117	100.0
Republican hold			

=== 2014 ===
2014 New York State Senate election, District 48
Party	Candidate	Votes	%
Republican	Patty Ritchie	42,718	
Independence	Patty Ritchie	6,501	
Conservative	Patty Ritchie	6,081	
Total	Patty Ritchie (incumbent)	55,300	99.5
Write-in		270	0.5
Total votes		55,570	100.0
Republican hold			

=== 2012 ===
2012 New York State Senate election, District 48
Party	Candidate	Votes	%
Republican	Patty Ritchie	55,029	
Conservative	Patty Ritchie	6,444	
Independence	Patty Ritchie	4,543	
Total	Patty Ritchie (incumbent)	66,016	69.9
Democratic	Amy Tresidder	52,621	
Working Families	Amy Tresidder	2,849	
Total	Amy Tresidder	28,470	30.1
Write-in		35	0.5
Total votes		94,521	100.0
Republican hold			

=== Federal results in District 48 ===
Year	Office	Results
2020	President	Trump 58.6 – 39.3%
2016	President	Trump 57.1 – 37.0%
2012	President	Obama 51.5 – 46.8%
2012	Senate	Gillibrand 63.1 – 34.9%
