= 2022 New York gubernatorial election =

- November 8, 2022
- Turnout: 47.74% ▼0.3 pp
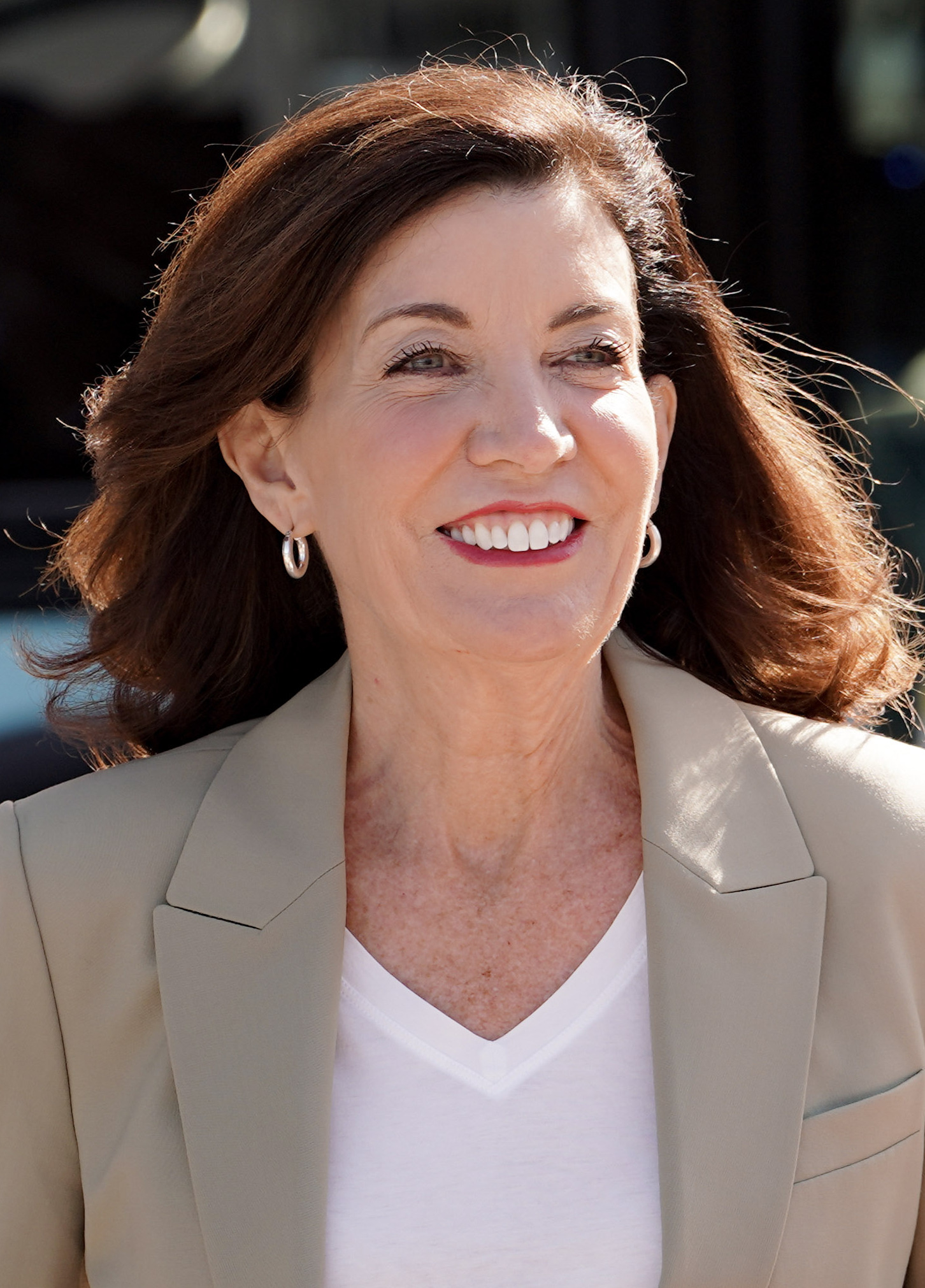

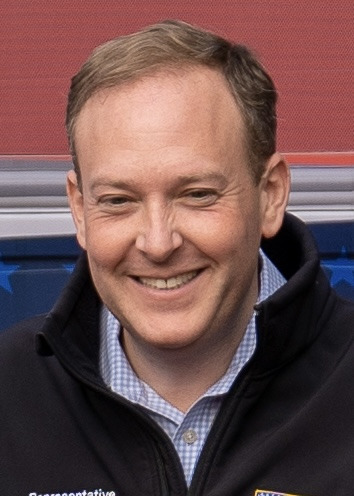
| Nominee | Kathy Hochul | Lee Zeldin |
| Party | Democratic | Republican |
| Alliance | Working Families | Conservative |
| Running mate | Antonio Delgado | Alison Esposito |
| Popular vote | 3,140,415 | 2,762,581 |
| Percentage | 53.12% | 46.73% |
- Hochul: 40–50% 50–60% 60–70% 70–80% 80–90% >90% Zeldin: 40–50% 50–60% 60–70% 70–80% 80–90% >90% Tie: 40–50% 50% No votes
Governor before election
Kathy Hochul
Democratic
Elected Governor
Kathy Hochul
Democratic

The 2022 New York gubernatorial election took place on November 8, 2022 to elect the governor and lieutenant governor of New York.

In August 2021, Lt. Gov. Kathy Hochul ascended to the governorship after Gov. Andrew Cuomo resigned in the wake of allegations of sexual harassment. A Democrat, Hochul sought a full term as governor in 2022 and defeated Jumaane Williams and Tom Suozzi in the June 28, 2022 Democratic primary. Antonio Delgado—who had been appointed lieutenant governor by Hochul earlier in 2022 to fill a vacancy—defeated Ana Maria Archila and Diana Reyna in the Democratic primary for lieutenant governor.

Lee Zeldin ran as the Republican nominee, having defeated Rob Astorino, Andrew Giuliani, and Harry Wilson in the Republican primary. Zeldin selected Alison Esposito, an NYPD officer, as his running mate. Esposito won unopposed in the primary for lieutenant governor, becoming the first openly gay major party nominee for statewide office in New York. This election was the first New York gubernatorial election in over 80 years not to feature any third-party candidates, although the Working Families Party endorsed Hochul and the Conservative Party endorsed Zeldin.

On Election Day, Hochul won a full term in office defeating Zeldin by a margin of 53.1%–46.7% and becoming the first woman to be elected governor of New York. This was New York's closest gubernatorial election since 1994.

== Democratic primary ==
In August 2021, after New York Governor Andrew Cuomo announced his resignation, then-Lieutenant Governor Kathy Hochul announced that she would run for governor in 2022. Hochul was sworn in as governor of New York on August 24, 2021. Hochul was elected to the position of lieutenant governor in 2014, and was re-elected in 2018; in both elections, she was Cuomo's running mate.

New York Attorney General Letitia James garnered attention for releasing a report on her office's investigation into alleged sexual harassment by Cuomo; the release of this report helped lead to Cuomo's resignation in August 2021. James announced her gubernatorial campaign in October 2021 and was considered a formidable challenger to Hochul.

On November 12, 2021, Newsday reported that Hochul had raised $10 million in campaign donations since taking office as governor. On November 16, 2021, New York City Public Advocate Jumaane Williams, described by CNN as "a progressive favorite from Brooklyn", announced his 2022 gubernatorial bid. Williams had run for lieutenant governor against Hochul in 2018, losing a close race. On November 29, 2021, U.S. Rep. Tom Suozzi of Long Island announced that he was running for governor. According to The New York Times, Suozzi was known as a "vocal centrist" and announced an intent to bill himself as a "'common-sense Democrat'". Suozzi was considered to have the potential to siphon votes away from Hochul.

In early December, James withdrew her gubernatorial candidacy and chose to seek re-election as attorney general instead. James' withdrawal from the race was seen as a positive development for Hochul, as James had been considered the second-strongest candidate in the race. The exit of James boosted the campaign of Williams, who became the only major candidate from New York City and the clear choice for the left wing of the Democratic Party.

On February 17, 2022, at the New York State Democratic Convention, Hochul was selected as the preferred Democratic candidate for governor of New York in 2022. At the convention, Hochul received 85.6% of the weighted vote, while Williams received 12.5%. Neither Williams nor Suozzi received sufficient support to obtain automatic ballot access and force a primary election; however, both candidates later gathered sufficient signatures to qualify for the Democratic primary ballot.

On June 28, 2022, Hochul won the Democratic gubernatorial primary with 67.6% of the vote, defeating Williams (19.4%) and Suozzi (13.0%).

=== Governor ===
==== Candidates ====
===== Nominee =====
- Kathy Hochul, incumbent governor of New York (2021–present) (running with Antonio Delgado) (Note: Hochul became governor in 2021 when her predecessor, Andrew Cuomo, resigned. Prior to that, she was the lieutenant governor of New York.)

===== Eliminated in primary =====
- Tom Suozzi, U.S. representative for New York's 3rd congressional district (2017–2023) and candidate in 2006 (running with Diana Reyna)
- Jumaane Williams, New York City Public Advocate (2019–present); candidate for lieutenant governor in 2018 (running with Ana María Archila)

===== Disqualified =====
- Paul Nichols, lawyer and legislative staffer (running with David Englert)

===== Withdrew =====
- Andrew Cuomo, former governor of New York (2011–2021)
- Letitia James, Attorney General of New York (2019–present) (running for re-election)

===== Declined =====
- Charles Barron, New York City Councilmember from the 42nd district (2002–2013, 2021–present); state assembly member from the 60th District (2015–present)
- Bill de Blasio, mayor of New York City (2014–2021); candidate for president of the United States in 2020
- Thomas DiNapoli, New York State Comptroller (2007–present) (running for re-election)
- Kirsten Gillibrand, U.S. senator from New York (2009–present); candidate for president of the United States in 2020 (endorsed Hochul)
- Svante Myrick, mayor of Ithaca (2012–2022)
- Cynthia Nixon, actress, activist and candidate for governor of New York in 2018
- Christine Quinn, Speaker of the New York City Council (2006–2013)
- Jessica Ramos, state senator from the 13th district (2019–present)
- Kathleen Rice, U.S. representative for NY-04 (2015–present) (endorsed Hochul)
- Al Sharpton, civil rights activist
- Andrea Stewart-Cousins, Majority Leader of the New York State Senate (2019–present); state senator from the 35th district (2007–present) (endorsed Hochul) (running for reelection)

==== Endorsements ====
Kathy Hochul

U.S. executive branch officials

- Hillary Clinton, former First Lady of the United States (1993–2001), former U.S. senator from New York (2001–2009), U.S. Secretary of State (2009–2013), Democratic nominee for president of the United States in 2016

U.S. senators

- Kirsten Gillibrand, U.S. senator from New York (2009–present), candidate for president of the United States in 2020

U.S. representatives

- Tim Bishop, U.S. representative from NY-01 (2003–2015)
- Brian Higgins, U.S. representative from NY-26 (2013–present) and NY-27 (2005–2013)
- Steve Israel, chair of the Democratic Congressional Campaign Committee (2011–2015), U.S. representative from NY-03 (2013–2017) and NY-02 (2001–2013)
- Hakeem Jeffries, chair of the House Democratic Caucus (2019–present), U.S. representative from NY-08 (2013–present)
- Nita Lowey, U.S. representative from NY-17 (1989–1993, 2013–2021) and NY-18 (1993–2013)
- Carolyn Maloney, U.S. representative from NY-12 (2013–2023) and NY-14 (1993–2013)
- Sean Patrick Maloney, chair of the Democratic Congressional Campaign Committee (2021–2023), U.S. representative from NY-18 (2013–2023)
- Gregory Meeks, chair of the House Foreign Affairs Committee (2021–present), chair of the Queens Democratic Party (2019–present), U.S. representative from NY-05 (2013–present) and NY-06 (1998–2013), former state assemblymember from the 31st district (1993–1998)
- Grace Meng, U.S. representative from NY-06 (2013–present)
- Charles Rangel, U.S. representative from NY-13 (2013–2017), NY-15 (1993–2013), NY-16 (1983–1993), and NY-19 (1971–1983)
- Kathleen Rice, U.S. representative from NY-04 (2015–present)
- Paul Tonko, U.S. representative from NY-20 (2013–present) and NY-21 (2009–2013),
- Nydia Velázquez, chair of the House Small Business Committee (2019–present, 2007–2011), U.S. representative from the 7th district (2013–present), former U.S. representative from the 12th district (1993–2013), former New York City Councilmember from the 27th district (1984–1985)

State officials

- Brian Benjamin, former lieutenant governor of New York (2021–2022), state senator from the 30th district (2017–2021)
- Antonio Delgado, lieutenant governor (2022–present), former U.S. representative from New York's 19th congressional district (2019–2022)
- Ned Lamont, governor of Connecticut (2019–present)
- Phil Murphy, governor of New Jersey (2018–present)
- Tom Wolf, governor of Pennsylvania (2015–2023)

State senators

- Jamaal Bailey, state senator from the 36th district (2017–present)
- Neil Breslin, state senator from the 44th district (2013–present), the 46th district (2002–2013), and the 42nd district (1997–2002)
- John Brooks, state senator from the 8th district (2017–present)
- Jeremy Cooney, state senator from the 56th district (2021–present)
- Jim Gaughran, state senator from the 5th district (2019–present)
- Andrew Gounardes, state senator from the 22nd district (2019–present)
- Peter Harckham, state senator from the 40th district (2019–present)
- Michelle Hinchey, state senator from the 46th district (2021–present)
- Brad Hoylman, state senator from the 27th district (2013–present)
- Todd Kaminsky, state senator from the 9th district (2016–2022) and the 20th district (2015–2016)
- Anna Kaplan, state senator from the 7th district (2019–present)
- Brian Kavanagh, state senator from the 26th district (2017–present)
- Tim Kennedy, state senator from the 63rd district (2013–2024), former state senator from the 58th district (2011–2013)
- Liz Krueger, state senator from the 28th district (2013–present) and the 26th district (2002–2012)
- John Mannion, state senator from the 50th district (2020–2024)
- Rachel May, state senator from the 53rd district (2019–present)
- Shelley Mayer, state senator from the 37th district (2018–present)
- Roxanne Persaud, state senator from the 19th district (2015–present)
- Elijah Reichlin-Melnick, state senator from the 38th district (2021–present)
- Sean Ryan, state senator from the 60th district (2021–present), former state assemblymember from the 149th district (2011–2021)
- Diane Savino, state senator from the 23rd district (2005–present)
- José M. Serrano, state senator from the 29th district (2013–present), former state senator from the 28th district (2005–2012), former New York City Councilmember from the 38th district (2002–2005)
- James Skoufis, state senator from the 39th district (2019–present) (previously endorsed James)
- Kevin Thomas, state senator from the 6th district (2019–present)

State assemblymembers

- Peter Abbate, state assemblymember from the 49th district (1987–present)
- Didi Barrett, state assemblymember from the 106th district (2013–present) and the 103rd district (2012–2013)
- Rodneyse Bichotte Hermelyn, chair of the Brooklyn Democratic Party (2020–present), state assemblymember from the 42nd district (2015–present)
- Harry Bronson, state assemblymember from the 138th district (2011–present)
- Chris Burdick, state assemblymember from the 93rd district (2021–present)
- Kenny Burgos, state assemblymember from the 85th district (2020–present)
- Robert Carroll, state assemblymember from the 44th district (2017–present)
- William Colton, state assemblymember from the 47th district (1997–present)
- William Conrad, state assemblymember from the 140th district (2021–present)
- Michael Cusick, chair of the Richmond County Democratic Committee (2019–present), state assemblymember from the 63rd district (2003–present)
- Steven Cymbrowitz, state assemblymember from the 45th district (2001–present)
- Taylor Darling, state assemblymember from the 18th district (2019–present)
- Maritza Davila, state assemblymember from the 53rd district (2013–present)
- Manny De Los Santos, state assemblymember from the 72nd district (2022–present)
- Inez Dickens, state assemblymember from the 70th district (2017–present)
- Erik Dilan, state assemblymember from the 54th district (2015–present)
- Steve Englebright, state assemblymember from the 4th district (1992–present)
- Pat Fahy, state assemblymember from the 109th district (2013–present)
- Nathalia Fernandez, state assemblymember from the 80th district (2019–present) (previously endorsed James)
- Sandy Galef, state assemblymember from the 95th district (1993–present)
- Eddie Gibbs, state assemblymember from the 68th district (2022–present)
- Deborah Glick, state assemblymember from the 66th district (1991–present)
- Richard Gottfried, state assemblymember from the 75th district (2003–present), the 64th district (1983–2002), the 67th district (1973–1982), and the 65th district (1971–1972)
- Judy Griffin, state assemblymember from the 21st district (2019–present)
- Pamela Hunter, state assemblymember from the 128th district (2015–present)
- Jonathan Jacobson, state assemblymember from the 104th district (2018–present)
- Billy Jones, state assemblymember from the 115th district (2017–present)
- Jennifer Lunsford, state assemblymember from the 135th district (2021–present)
- Donna Lupardo, state assemblymember from the 123rd district (2005–present)
- Bill Magnarelli, state assemblymember from the 129th district (1999–present)
- John McDonald, state assemblymember from the 108th district (2013–present)
- Karen McMahon, state assemblymember from the 146th district (2019–present)
- Cathy Nolan, Deputy Speaker of the New York State Assembly (2019–present), state assemblymember from the 37th district (1985–present)
- Danny O'Donnell, state assemblymember from the 69th district (2003–present)
- Steve Otis, state assemblymember from the 91st district (2013–present)
- Amy Paulin, state assemblymember from the 88th district (2001–present)
- Crystal D. Peoples-Stokes, Majority Leader of New York State Assembly (2018–present), state assemblymember from the 141st district (2003–present)
- Gary Pretlow, state assemblymember from the 89th district (1993–present)
- Jonathan Rivera, state assemblymember from the 149th district (2021–present)
- Nily Rozic, state assemblymember from the 25th district (2013–present) (previously endorsed James)
- Nader Sayegh, state assemblymember from the 90th district (2019–present)
- Rebecca Seawright, state assemblymember from the 76th district (2015–present)
- Frank Seddio, former chair of the Brooklyn Democratic Party (2012–2020), former state assemblymember from the 59th district (2003–2006), and the 39th district (1999–2003)
- Gina Sillitti, state assemblymember from the 16th district (2021–present)
- Jo Anne Simon, state assemblymember from the 52nd district (2015–present)
- Steve Stern, state assemblymember from the 10th district (2018–present)
- Al Stirpe, state assemblymember from the 127th district (2007–2010, 2013–present)
- Yudelka Tapia, state assemblymember from the 86th district (2021–present)
- Fred Thiele, state assemblymember from the 1st district (2013–present) and the 2nd district (1992–2012)
- Monica Wallace, state assemblymember from the 143rd district (2017–present)
- Jaime Williams, state assemblymember from the 59th district (2016–present)
- Carrie Woerner, state assemblymember from the 113th district (2015–present)
- Kenneth Zebrowski Jr., state assemblymember from the 96th district (2007–present)

Local officials

- Shaun Abreu, New York City Councilmember from the 7th district (2022–present)
- Eric Adams, mayor of New York City (2022–present), former borough president of Brooklyn (2014–2021), former state senator from the 20th district (2007–2013)
- Diana Ayala, Deputy Speaker of the New York City Council (2022–present), New York City Councilmember from the 8th district (2018–present)
- Erik Bottcher, New York City Councilmember from the 3rd district (2022–present)
- Noam Bramson, mayor of New Rochelle (2006–present)
- Justin Brannan, New York City Councilmember from the 43rd district (2018–present)
- Gale Brewer, New York City Councilmember from the 6th district (2002–2013, 2022–present), former borough president of Manhattan (2014–2021)
- Byron Brown, mayor of Buffalo (2006–present), former chair of the New York State Democratic Party (2016–2019), former state senator from the 60th district (2003–2005) (Independent)
- Eric Dinowitz, New York City Councilmember from the 11th district (2021–present)
- Oswald Feliz, New York City Councilmember from the 15th district (2021–present)
- Barbara Fiala, former superintendent of the New York State Department of Motor Vehicles (2011–2014), former Broome County Executive (2005–2010)
- Kamillah Hanks, New York City Councilmember from the 49th district (2022–present)
- Corey Johnson, former Speaker of the New York City Council (2018–2021), former New York City Councilmember from the 3rd district (2014–2021), former acting New York City Public Advocate (2019)
- Ari Kagan, New York City Councilmember from the 47th district (2022–present)
- George Latimer, Westchester County Executive (2018–present), former state senator from the 37th district (2013–2017) (previously endorsed James)
- Alan Maisel, former New York City Councilmember from the 46th district (2014–2021), former state assemblymember from the 59th district (2006–2013)
- Julie Menin, New York City Councilmember from the 5th district (2022–present)
- Donovan Richards, borough president of Queens (2020–present)
- Thomas Roach, mayor of White Plains (2011–present)
- Rafael Salamanca, New York City Councilmember from the 17th district (2017–present)
- Lynn Schulman, New York City Councilmember from the 29th district (2022–present)
- Kathy Sheehan, mayor of Albany (2014–present)
- Mike Spano, mayor of Yonkers (2012–present), former state assemblymember from the 93rd district (2007–2011), the 87th district (1995–2004), and the 83rd district (1992)
- Sandra Ung, New York City Councilmember from the 20th district (2022–present)

Individuals

- Rev. A. R. Bernard, pastor
- Hazel Nell Dukes, former president of the NAACP

Organizations

- Democratic Governors Association
- EMILY's List
- Everytown for Gun Safety Action Fund
- Natural Resources Defense Council Action Fund
- Stonewall Democratic Club of New York

Media

- The New York Times
- Newsday

Labor unions

- Amalgamated Transit Union
- Building and Construction Trades Council of Westchester and Putnam counties
- Civil Service Employees Association
- Council of School Supervisors & Administrators
- Hotel Trades Council
- International Brotherhood of Electrical Workers (7 local chapters)
- LiUNA New York
- New York AFL–CIO
- New York State Building and Construction Trades Council
- New York State United Teachers
- Retail, Wholesale and Department Store Union
- SEIU 32BJ
- Transport Workers Union Local 100
- UNITE HERE Local 100
- United Steelworkers
Letitia James (withdrawn)

State officials

- Keith Ellison, Attorney General of Minnesota (2019–present), former U.S. representative from Minnesota's 5th congressional district (2007–2019), former member of the Minnesota House of Representatives from the 58B district (2003–2007)

State senators

- Kevin Parker, state senator from the 21st district (2003–present)
- Jessica Ramos, state senator from the 13th district (2019–present)
- ~~James Skoufis, state senator from the 39th district (2019–present), former state assemblymember from the 99th district (2013–2019)~~ (switched endorsement to Hochul after James withdrew)

State assemblymembers

- ~~Nathalia Fernandez, state assemblymember from the 80th district (2019–present)~~ (switched endorsement to Hochul after James withdrew)
- Alicia Hyndman, state assemblymember from the 29th district (2016–present)
- Kimberly Jean-Pierre, state assemblymember from the 11th district (2015–present)
- ~~Nily Rozic, state assemblymember from the 25th district (2013–present)~~ (switched endorsement to Hochul after James withdrew)

Local officials

- Vanessa Gibson, borough president of The Bronx (2022–present), former New York City Councilmember from the 16th district (2014–2022)
- ~~George Latimer, Westchester County Executive (2018–present), former state senator from the 37th district (2013–2017), former state assemblymember from the 91st district (2005–2012)~~ (switched endorsement to Hochul after James withdrew)
- Mark Levine, borough president of Manhattan (2022–present), former New York City Councilmember from the 7th district (2014–2021)
- David Tubiolo, member of the Westchester County Board of Legislators from the 14th district (2016–present)

Labor unions

- Transport Workers Union of America
Tom Suozzi

Local officials

- Fernando Ferrer, vice chairman of the MTA (2011–present), former chairman of the MTA (2013, 2017, 2018–2019), former borough president of The Bronx (1987–2001), former New York City Councilmember from the 13th district (1982–1987), nominee for mayor of New York City in 2005 and candidate in 2001 and 1997
- Bob Holden, New York City Councilmember from the 30th district (2018–present)
- Diana Reyna, former New York City councilmember from the 34th district (2001–2013)

Labor unions

- Brotherhood of Railroad Signalmen Local 56
- Brotherhood of Railroad Signalmen Local 241
- International Brotherhood of Electrical Workers Local No. 3
- International Brotherhood of Electrical Workers Local 25
- International Brotherhood of Electrical Workers Local 1049
- Utility Workers Union of America Local 1-2

Media

- The Jewish Press
Jumaane Williams

State senators

- Nina Turner, president of Our Revolution (2017–present), former Ohio state senator from the 25th district (2008–2014), former member of the Cleveland City Council from Ward 1 (2006–2008), Democratic nominee for Ohio Secretary of State in 2014, candidate for Ohio's 11th congressional district in 2021, candidate for Ohio's 11th congressional district in 2022

State assemblymembers

- Ron Kim, state assemblyman from the 40th district (2013–present)
- Yuh-Line Niou, state assemblywoman from the 65th district (2017–2022)

Local officials

- Alexa Avilés, New York City Councilmember from the 38th district (2022–present)
- Rachel Barnhart, assistant minority leader of the Monroe County legislature
- Tiffany Cabán, New York City Councilmember from the 22nd district (2021–present)
- Jennifer Gutiérrez, New York City Councilmember from the 34th district (2022–present)
- Shahana Hanif, New York City Councilmember from the 39th district (2022–present)
- Brad Lander, New York City Comptroller (2022–present) New York City Councilmember from the 39th district (2010–2021)
- Mary Lupien, member of the Rochester city council
- Christopher Marte, New York City Councilmember from the 1st district (2022–present)
- Stanley Martin, member of the Rochester city council
- Mercedes Narcisse, New York City Councilmember from the 46th district (2022–present)
- Sandy Nurse, New York City Councilmember from the 37th district (2022–present)
- Lincoln Restler, New York City Councilmember from the 33rd district (2022–present)
- Antonio Reynoso, borough president of Brooklyn (2022–present), New York City Councilmember from the 34th district (2014–2021)
- Kim Smith, member of the Rochester city council
- Julie Won, New York City Councilmember from the 26th district (2022–present)

Individuals

- India Walton, Democratic nominee for mayor of Buffalo in 2021

Organizations

- Center for Popular Democracy Action
- Citizen Action
- Indivisible Nation Brooklyn
- Make the Road Action
- New York Communities for Change
- Our Revolution
- Voices of Community Activists and Leaders (VOCAL) Action Fund
- Working Families Party

==== Debates ====
2022 New York gubernatorial Democratic primary debates
| Date | Host | Location | Moderator | Link | Participants | | |
|---|---|---|---|---|---|---|---|
| Date | Host | Location | Moderator | Link | Kathy Hochul | Tom Suozzi | Jumaane Williams |
| June 7, 2022 | CBS New York; WCBS Newsradio 880 | New York, New York | Maurice DuBois; Marcia Kramer | | P | P | P |
| June 20, 2022 | NBC New York; Telemundo 47 | New York, New York | David Ushery | | P | P | P |

==== Polling ====
| Source of poll aggregation | Dates administered | Dates updated | Kathy Hochul | Tom Suozzi | Jumaane Williams | Other (Note: Calculated by taking the difference of 100% and all other candidates combined.) | Margin |
|---|---|---|---|---|---|---|---|
| Real Clear Politics | June 6–20, 2022 | June 22, 2022 | 58.5% | 18.0% | 14.5% | 9.0% | Hochul +40.5 |

Hypothetical polling

| Poll source | Date(s) administered | Sample size (Note: Key: A – all adults RV – registered voters LV – likely voters V – unclear) | Margin of error | Steven Bellone | Preet Bharara | Alessandra Biaggi | Andrew Cuomo | Bill de Blasio | Thomas DiNapoli | Kathryn Garcia | Kirsten Gillibrand | Kathy Hochul | Letitia James | Sean Patrick Maloney | Alexandria Ocasio-Cortez | Tom Suozzi | Scott Stringer | Jumaane Williams | Other | Undecided |
|---|---|---|---|---|---|---|---|---|---|---|---|---|---|---|---|---|---|---|---|---|
| Siena College | March 20–24, 2022 | 369 (RV) | ± 5.5% | – | – | – | 30% | – | – | – | – | 38% | – | – | – | 10% | – | 7% | 1% | 14% |
| Emerson College | March 9–10, 2022 | 504 (LV) | ± 4.3% | – | – | – | 33% | – | – | – | – | 37% | – | – | – | 7% | – | 4% | 9% (Note: "Someone else" with 7%, Nichols with 2%) | 9% |
| Zogby Analytics | January 21–24, 2022 | 413 (LV) | ± 4.8% | – | – | – | 20% | – | – | – | – | 41% | – | – | – | 7% | – | 13% | 5% | 14% |
| Data for Progress (D) (Note: This poll was sponsored by Neal Kwatra on behalf of an unnamed donor.) | November 16–17, 2021 | 528 (LV) | ± 4.0% | – | – | – | 15% | 3% | – | – | – | 36% | 22% | – | – | 6% | – | 7% | – | 11% |
| Data for Progress (D) | November 16–17, 2021 | 528 (LV) | ± 4.0% | – | – | – | 27% | – | – | – | – | 64% | – | – | – | – | – | – | – | 9% |
| Siena College | October 10–14, 2021 | 419 (RV) | ± 5.4% | – | – | – | 17% | 6% | – | – | – | 31% | 14% | – | – | – | – | 7% | 2% | 23% |
| Marist College | October 4–7, 2021 | 389 (RV) | ± 6.9% | – | – | – | 19% | – | – | – | 36% | 24% | – | – | – | – | – | 9% | – | 12% |
| co/efficient (R) | August 15–16, 2021 | 814 (LV) | ± 3.4% | – | – | – | – | – | – | – | – | 45% | – | – | 26% | – | – | – | 30% | |
| Slingshot Strategies (D) | August 6–7, 2021 | 600 (LV) | ± 4.0% | 2% | 4% | 1% | 26% | 3% | 3% | 6% | 6% | 4% | 9% | 2% | 8% | 2% | 3% | 2% | – | 19% |
| Slingshot Strategies (D) | August 6–7, 2021 | 600 (LV) | ± 4.0% | 3% | 6% | 2% | – | 5% | 3% | 8% | 10% | 6% | 13% | 3% | 10% | 2% | 4% | 4% | – | 22% |
| Zogby Analytics | February 3–5, 2021 | 316 (LV) | ± 5.5% | – | – | – | 65% | – | – | – | – | – | 22% | – | – | – | – | – | – | 13% |
| Zogby Analytics | February 3–5, 2021 | 316 (LV) | ± 5.5% | – | – | – | 67% | – | – | – | – | – | – | – | 24% | – | – | – | – | 9% |

==== Results ====
Results by county Hochul: 50–60%; 60–70%; 70–80%; 80–90%

Hochul: 30–40%; 40–50%; 50–60%; 60–70%; 70–80%; 80–90%; >90%; Williams: 30–40%; 40–50%; 50–60%; 60–70%; 70–80%; 80–90%; >90%; Suozzi: 30–40%; 40–50%; 50–60%; 60–70%; 70–80%; 80–90%; 90–100%; Tie: 30-40%; 40-50%; 50%; No Votes

Democratic gubernatorial primary results
| Party | Candidate | Votes | % |
|---|---|---|---|
| Democratic | Kathy Hochul (incumbent) | 607,928 | 67.64% |
| Democratic | Jumaane Williams | 173,872 | 19.35% |
| Democratic | Tom Suozzi | 116,972 | 13.01% |
| Total votes | | 898,772 | 100.0% |

=== Lieutenant governor ===
On April 12, 2022, incumbent lieutenant governor Brian Benjamin resigned from office after being arrested for campaign finance violations. On May 3, 2022, Hochul announced her intent to appoint Representative Antonio Delgado to the position of lieutenant governor. He was sworn in on May 25. Delgado ran for lieutenant governor in the June 2022 primary, winning by a large margin.

==== Candidates ====
===== Nominee =====
- Antonio Delgado, lieutenant governor (2022–present), former U.S. representative from New York's 19th congressional district (2019–2022)

===== Eliminated in primary =====
- Ana Maria Archila, Center for Popular Democracy transition advisor and former co-executive director, co-founder of Make the Road New York
- Diana Reyna, deputy borough president of Brooklyn (2014–2018), New York City Councilor from the 34th district (2001–2013)

===== Disqualified =====
- David Englert, mayor of Sodus

===== Withdrawn =====
- Brian Benjamin, lieutenant governor of New York (2021–2022), state senator from the 30th district (2017–2021); candidate for New York City Comptroller in 2021

===== Declined =====
- Svante Myrick, mayor of Ithaca (2012–2022)

==== Endorsements ====
Ana María Archila

U.S. representatives

- Jamaal Bowman, U.S. representative from the 16th district (2021–present)
- Alexandria Ocasio-Cortez, U.S. representative from New York's 14th congressional district (2019–present)
- Nydia Velázquez, chair of the House Small Business Committee (2019–present, 2007–2011), U.S. representative from the 7th district (2013–present), former U.S. representative from the 12th district (1993–2013), former New York City Councilmember from the 27th district (1984–1985)

State senators

- Alessandra Biaggi, state senator from the 34th district (2019–present)
- Jabari Brisport, state senator from the 18th district (2021–present)
- Michael Gianaris, Deputy Majority Leader of the New York State Senate (2019–present), state senator from the 12th district (2011–present), former state assemblymember from the 36th district (2001–2010)
- Andrew Gounardes, state senator from the 22nd district (2019–present)
- John Liu, state senator from the 11th district (2019–present), former New York City Comptroller (2010–2013), former New York City Councilmember from the 20th district (2002–2009)
- Gustavo Rivera, state senator from the 33rd district (2011–present)
- Julia Salazar, state senator from the 18th district (2019–present)
- James Sanders Jr., state senator from the 10th district (2013–present), former New York City Councilmember from the 31st district (2002–2013)

State assemblymembers

- Harvey Epstein, state assemblymember from the 74th district (2018–present)
- Mathylde Frontus, state assemblymember from the 46th district (2018–present)
- Emily Gallagher, state assemblymember from the 50th district (2021–present)
- Jessica González-Rojas, state assemblymember from the 34th district (2021–present)
- Ron Kim, state assemblymember from the 40th district (2013–present)
- Zohran Mamdani, state assemblymember from the 36th district (2021–present)
- Marcela Mitaynes, state assemblymember from the 51st district (2021–present)
- Yuh-Line Niou, state assemblymember from the 65th district (2017–present)
- Philip Ramos, Deputy Majority Leader of the New York State Assembly (2015–present), state assemblymember from the 6th district (2003–present)
- Phara Souffrant Forrest, state assemblymember from the 57th district (2021–present)

Local officials

- Sergio Adams, Albany Common Councilmember for the 7th Ward (2022–present)
- Alexa Avilés, New York City Councilmember from the 38th district (2022–present)
- Dan Aymar-Blair, Beacon City Councilmember for Ward 4 (2020–present)
- Rachel Barnhart, Monroe County Legislator for the 21st District (2022–present)
- Tiffany Cabán, New York City Councilmember from the 22nd district (2022–present), former candidate for Queens County District Attorney in 2019
- Samuel Fein, Albany County Legislator for the 6th District (2016–present)
- Aviva Friedman, Binghamton City Councilmember for the 4th District (2020–present)
- Shahana Hanif, New York City Councilmember from the 39th district (2022–present)
- Crystal Hudson, New York City Councilmember from the 35th district (2022–present)
- Shekar Krishnan, New York City Councilmember from the 25th district (2022–present)
- Brad Lander, New York City Comptroller (2022–present), former New York City Councilmember from the 39th district (2010–2021)
- Kevindaryan Lujan, Orange County Legislator for the 4th District (2018–present)
- Mary Lupian, vice president of the Rochester City Council
- Stanley Martin, Rochester City Councilmember at-Large (2022–present)
- Giselle Martinez, Newburgh Councilmember for the 1st Ward (2022–present)
- Justice McCray, Beacon City Councilmember for Ward 2 (2022–present)
- Ramona Monteverde, Newburgh City Councilmember for Ward 2 (2018–present)
- Brian Nowak, Cheektowaga Councilmember (2018–present)
- Sandy Nurse, New York City Councilmember from the 37th district (2022–present)
- Chi Ossé, New York City Councilmember from the 36th district (2022–present)
- Genesis Ramos, Orange County Legislator for the 6th District (2022–present)
- Lincoln Restler, New York City Councilmember from the 33rd district (2022–present)
- Gabriella Romero, Albany Common Councilmember (2022–present)
- Omari Shakur, Newburgh City Councilmember at-Large (2020–present)
- Kim Smith, Rochester City Councilmember at-Large (2022–present)
- Paloma Wake, Beacon City Councilmember at-Large (2022–present)
- Jumaane Williams, New York City Public Advocate (2019–present), former New York City Councilmember from the 45th district (2010–2019), former candidate for lieutenant governor of New York in 2018
- Julie Won, New York City Councilmember from the 26th district (2022–present)

Individuals

- Ray Harvey, president of the NAACP Newburgh-Highland Falls Chapter
- Cynthia Nixon, activist, actress, and former candidate for governor of New York in 2018

Organizations

- Center for Popular Democracy Action
- Citizen Action
- Empire State Indivisible
- Indivisible Nation Brooklyn
- Jim Owles Liberal Democratic Club
- Lesbian and Gay Democratic Club of Queens
- Make the Road Action
- New York Communities for Change
- Our Revolution
- People's Action
- Stonewall Democrats of New York
- Voteprochoice
- Working Families Party
- Young Democrats of America Brooklyn Chapter

Labor unions

- Committee of Interns and Residents
- National Association of Social Workers New York City Chapter
Brian Benjamin (withdrawn)

State officials

- ~~Kathy Hochul, governor of New York (2021–present), former lieutenant governor of New York (2015–2021), former U.S. representative from the 26th district (2011–2013), former Erie County Clerk~~ (switched endorsement to Delgado after Benjamin withdrew)
Antonio Delgado

U.S. representatives

- Brian Higgins, U.S. representative from New York's 26th congressional district (2013–present), former U.S. representative from New York's 27th congressional district (2005–2013), former state assemblymember from the 145th district (1999–2004), former Buffalo Common Councilmember from the South district (1988–1993)
- Gregory Meeks, chair of the House Foreign Affairs Committee (2021–present), chair of the Queens Democratic Party (2019–present), U.S. representative from New York's 5th congressional district (2013–present), former U.S. representative from New York's 6th congressional district (1998–2013), former state assemblymember from the 31st district (1993–1998)
- Ritchie Torres, U.S. representative from New York's 15th congressional district (2021–present), former New York City Councilmember from the 15th district (2014–2020)

State officials

- Kathy Hochul, governor of New York (2021–present), former lieutenant governor of New York (2015–2021), former U.S. representative from the 26th district (2011–2013), former Erie County Clerk (previously endorsed Benjamin)

State senators

- Jamaal Bailey, chair of The Bronx Democratic Party (2020–present), state senator from the 36th district (2017–present)
- Jeremy Cooney, state senator from the 56th district (2021–present)
- Tim Kennedy, state senator from the 63rd district (2013–present), former state senator from the 58th district (2011–2013)
- Sean Ryan, state senator from the 60th district (2021–present), former state assemblymember from the 149th district (2011–2021)
- José M. Serrano, state senator from the 29th district (2013–present), former state senator from the 28th district (2005–2012), former New York City Councilmember from the 38th district (2002–2005)

State assemblymembers

- Rodneyse Bichotte Hermelyn, chair of the Brooklyn Democratic Party (2020–present), state assemblymember from the 42nd district (2015–present)
- William Conrad, state assemblymember from the 140th district (2021–present)
- Michael Cusick, chair of the Richmond County Democratic Committee (2019–present), state assemblymember from the 63rd district (2003–present)
- Inez Dickens, state assemblymember from the 70th district (2017–present), former Minority Whip of the New York City Council (2006–2013), former New York City Councilmember from the 9th district (2006–2016)
- Jeffrey Dinowitz, state assemblymember from the 81st district (1994–present)
- Nathalia Fernandez, state assemblymember from the 80th district (2019–present)
- Eddie Gibbs, state assemblymember from the 68th district (2022–present)
- Chantel Jackson, state assemblymember from the 79th district (2021–present)
- Latoya Joyner, state assemblymember from the 77th district (2015–present)
- Karen McMahon, state assemblymember from the 146th district (2019–present)
- Crystal Peoples-Stokes, Majority Leader of New York State Assembly (2018–present), state assemblymember from the 141st district (2003–present)
- Yudelka Tapia, state assemblymember from the 86th district (2021–present)
- Al Taylor, state assemblymember from the 71st district (2017–present)
- Monica Wallace, state assemblymember from the 143rd district (2017–present)

Local officials

- Byron Brown, mayor of Buffalo (2006–present), former chair of the New York State Democratic Party (2016–2019), former state senator from the 60th district (2003–2005) (Independent)
- Eric Dinowitz, New York City Councilmember from the 11th district (2021–present)
- Vanessa Gibson, borough president of The Bronx (2022–present), former New York City Councilmember from the 16th district (2014–2022)
- Kevin Riley, New York City Councilmember from the 12th district (2021–present)

Newspapers

- The Jewish Press

Organizations

- The Bronx Democratic Party
- Everytown for Gun Safety Action Fund
- New York State Democratic Party

Labor unions

- New York State AFL–CIO
- New York State Iron Workers
- New York State United Teachers
- SEIU 32BJ
David Englert (disqualified)

Individuals

- Paul Nichols, lawyer and legislative staffer
Diana Reyna

U.S. representatives

- Thomas Suozzi, U.S. representative from the 3rd district (2017–present), former County Executive of Nassau County (2002–2009), former mayor of Glen Cove (1994–2001)

Local officials

- Rubén Díaz Sr., former New York City Councilmember from the 18th district (2018–2021, 2002–2003), former state senator from the 32nd district (2003–2017)
- Fernando Ferrer, Vice Chairman of the MTA (2011–present), former chairman of the MTA (2013; 2017; 2018–2019), former borough president of The Bronx (1987–2001), former New York City Councilmember from the 13th district (1982–1987), nominee for mayor of New York City in 2005 and candidate in 2001 and 1997
- Bob Holden, New York City Councilmember from the 30th district (2018–present)
- Rafael Salamanca, New York City Councilmember from the 17th district (2016–present)

Labor unions

- Brotherhood of Railroad Signalmen Local 56
- Brotherhood of Railroad Signalmen Local 241
- International Brotherhood of Electrical Workers Local No. 3
- International Brotherhood of Electrical Workers Local 25
- International Brotherhood of Electrical Workers Local 1049
- Utility Workers Union of America Local 1-2
Declined to endorse

Local officials

- Eric Adams, mayor of New York City (2022–2025), former borough president of Brooklyn (2014–2021), former state senator from the 20th district (2007–2013)

Newspapers

- The New York Times

==== Results ====
Results by county Delgado: 40–50%; 50–60%; 60–70%; 70–80%; 80–90%; >90%

Delgado: 30–40%; 40–50%; 50–60%; 60–70%; 70–80%; 80–90%; >90%; Archila: 30–40%; 40–50%; 50–60%; 60–70%; 70–80%; 80–90%; >90%; Reyna: 30–40%; 40–50%; 50–60%; 60–70%; 70–80%; 80–90%; 90–100%; Tied: 30-40%; 40-50%; 50%; No Votes

Democratic lieutenant gubernatorial primary results
| Party | Candidate | Votes | % |
|---|---|---|---|
| Democratic | Antonio Delgado (incumbent) | 522,069 | 60.93% |
| Democratic | Ana Maria Archila | 213,210 | 24.88% |
| Democratic | Diana Reyna | 121,589 | 14.19% |
| Total votes | | 856,868 | 100.0% |

== Republican primary ==
In June 2020, Lewis County sheriff Mike Carpinelli became the first Republican to enter the race. He was the only announced challenger until Long Island congressman Lee Zeldin announced his own campaign in April 2021. By the end of April, Zeldin had announced that the Republican Party chairs of Erie County and Niagara County had endorsed his campaign, giving him the necessary 50% of state committee support to gain the Republican nomination. Trump administration official Andrew Giuliani and 2014 New York gubernatorial nominee Rob Astorino made campaign announcements the following month. Contractor and podcast host Derrick Gibson also entered the race.

In June 2021, Zeldin was named the presumed nominee of the New York's Republican Party by state chairman Nick Langworthy after he earned 85 percent of a straw poll vote of county leaders, and was also called the presumptive nominee of the Conservative Party by Conservative state chairman Gerard Kassar. As of February 2022, Zeldin had received the endorsements of 59 of New York's 62 county Republican committees.

In February 2022, shortly before the Republican convention, businessman Harry Wilson announced his candidacy for governor of New York. Wilson stated that he intended to invest $12 million of his own money in the race.

At the Republican convention in Nassau County, Zeldin received 85 percent support from the party's voting committee members, with Astorino and Wilson each receiving 7 percent of the vote and Giuliani receiving less than one percent.

On June 28, 2022, the primary election was held. Zeldin prevailed, receiving the most votes in 48 of New York's 62 counties and earning 76% of the vote in his native Suffolk County. Zeldin received 43.6% of the vote, defeating Giuliani (22.9%), Astorino (18.7%), and Wilson (14.8%).

=== Governor ===
==== Candidates ====
===== Nominee =====
- Lee Zeldin, U.S. representative for NY-01 (2015–2023) (running with Alison Esposito)

===== Eliminated in primary =====
- Rob Astorino, Westchester County executive (2010–2017) and nominee for governor in 2014
- Andrew Giuliani, former special assistant to the president, Newsmax TV contributor, and son of former New York City mayor Rudy Giuliani
- Harry Wilson, businessman and nominee for comptroller in 2010

===== Disqualified =====
- Derrick Gibson, contractor and podcast host

===== Withdrawn =====
- Mike Carpinelli, Lewis County sheriff (endorsed Giuliani)

===== Declined =====
- John Catsimatidis, businessman, owner of WABC radio and Gristedes Foods, and 2013 candidate for mayor of New York City
- Joel Giambra, Erie County executive (2000–2007) (seeking New York State Senate seat)
- John Katko, U.S. representative for NY-24 (2015–2023) (endorsed Zeldin)
- Marc Molinaro, Dutchess County executive (2012–present), state assembly member from the 103rd District (2007–2011), and gubernatorial nominee in 2018 (endorsed Zeldin) (running for U.S. House)
- George Pataki, governor of New York (1995–2006)
- Tom Reed, U.S. representative for NY-23 (2010–2022)

==== Endorsements ====
Andrew Giuliani

Individuals

- Mike Carpinelli, Lewis County sheriff and former candidate in this primary
- Michael Flynn, retired United States Army lieutenant general and former U.S. National Security Advisor

Organizations

- New York Young Republican Club
Lee Zeldin

Executive officials

- Mike Pence, 48th vice president of the United States (2017–2021), Governor of Indiana (2013–2017), and Member of the U.S. House of Representatives from Indiana (2001–2013)
- Mike Pompeo, United States secretary of state (2018–2021), director of the Central Intelligence Agency (2017–2018)

U.S. representatives

- Andrew Garbarino, U.S. representative for NY-02 (2021–present)
- Chris Jacobs, U.S. representative for NY-27 (2020–2023)
- Jim Jordan, U.S. representative for OH-04 (2007–present)
- John Katko, U.S. representative for NY-24 (2015–2023)
- Nicole Malliotakis, U.S. representative for NY-11 (2021–present)

State legislators

- Joe Angelino, New York state assemblyman from the 122nd district (2021–present)
- William Barclay, Minority Leader of the New York State Assembly (2020–present), New York state assemblyman from the 120th district (2003–present)
- George Borrello, New York state senator from the 57th district (2019–present)
- Keith Brown, New York state assemblyman from the 12th district (2021–present)
- Marjorie Byrnes, New York state assemblywoman from the 133rd district (2019–present)
- Michael Fitzpatrick, New York state assemblyman from the 8th district (2003–present)
- Patrick Gallivan, New York state senator from the 59th district (2011–present)
- Joseph Giglio, New York state assemblyman from the 148th district (2013–present)
- Andy Goodell, New York state assemblyman from the 150th district (2011–present)
- Stephen Hawley, New York state assemblyman from the 139th district (2006–present)
- Josh Jensen, New York state assemblyman from the 134th district (2021–present)
- John Lemondes Jr., New York state assemblyman from the 126th district (2021–present)
- Mike Martucci, New York state senator from the 42nd district (2021–present)
- Brian Miller, New York state assemblyman from the 101st district (2017–present)
- Angelo Morinello, New York state assemblyman from the 145th district (2017–present)
- Mike Norris, New York state assemblyman from the 148th district (2017–present)
- Rob Ortt, Minority Leader of the New York State Senate (2020–present), New York state senator from the 62nd district (2015–present)
- Edward Rath III, New York state senator from the 61st district (2021–present)
- Michael Reilly, New York state assemblyman from the 62nd district (2019–present)
- Matt Simpson, New York state assemblyman from the 114th district (2021–present)
- Robert Smullen, New York state assemblyman from the 118th district (2019–present)
- Christopher Tague, New York state assemblyman from the 102nd district (2018–present)
- Mark Walczyk, New York state assemblyman from the 116th district (2019–present)
- Mary Beth Walsh, New York state assemblywoman from the 112th district (2017–present)

Local officials

- Bruce Blakeman, Nassau County executive (2022–present)
- Steven McLaughlin, Rensselaer County executive (2018–present) and former state assemblyman for the 107th district
- Marc Molinaro, Dutchess County executive (2012–present), former state assemblyman for the 103rd district, and Republican gubernatorial nominee in 2018

Individuals

- Newt Gingrich, 2012 Republican presidential candidate and former Speaker of the United States House of Representatives (1995–1999) and U.S. Representative (GA-06) (1979–1999)
- Nick Langworthy, chair of the New York Republican Party
- Randy Levine, president of the New York Yankees
- Carl Paladino, businessman and Republican nominee in the 2010 New York gubernatorial election

Media

- The Jewish Press

Organizations

- Conservative Party of New York State
- International Union of Operating Engineers Local 138
- Laborers' Local 1298
- New York Republican State Committee
Declined to endorse

Media

- The New York Times

==== Debates ====
2022 New York gubernatorial Republican primary debates
| Date | Host | Location | Moderator | Link | Participants | | | |
|---|---|---|---|---|---|---|---|---|
| Date | Host | Location | Moderator | Link | Lee Zeldin | Andrew Giuliani | Rob Astorino | Harry Wilson |
| June 13, 2022 | CBS New York | New York, New York | Maurice DuBois; Marcia Kramer | Video | P | P | P | P |
| June 20, 2022 | NY1 | New York, New York | Susan Arbetter; Errol Louis | Video | P | P | P | P |
| June 21, 2022 | Newsmax | Rochester, New York | Eric Bolling | Video | P | P | P | P |

==== Polling ====
| Source of poll aggregation | Dates administered | Dates updated | Lee Zeldin | Andrew Giuliani | Rob Astorino | Harry Wilson | Other (Note: Calculated by taking the difference of 100% and all other candidates combined.) | Margin |
|---|---|---|---|---|---|---|---|---|
| Real Clear Politics | June 6–20, 2022 | June 22, 2022 | 32.5% | 20.0% | 15.5% | 16.5% | 24.3% | Zeldin +12.5 |

| Poll source | Date(s) administered | Sample size | Margin of error | Rob Astorino | Michael Carpinelli | Derrick Gibson | Andrew Giuliani | Harry Wilson | Lee Zeldin | Other | Undecided |
|---|---|---|---|---|---|---|---|---|---|---|---|
| John Zogby Strategies | June 20–22, 2022 | 400 (LV) | ± 5.0% | 16% | – | – | 28% | 14% | 35% | – | 8% |
| SurveyUSA | June 15–20, 2022 | 538 (LV) | ± 5.4% | 8% | – | – | 23% | 13% | 25% | – | 31% |
| McLaughlin & Associates (R) | June 16–19, 2022 | 600 (LV) | ± 4.0% | 17% | – | – | 17% | 16% | 38% | – | 12% |
| Emerson College | June 9–10, 2022 | 500 (LV) | ± 4.3% | 16% | – | – | 13% | 15% | 34% | – | 22% |
| McLaughlin & Associates (R) | May 24–25, 2022 | 600 (LV) | ± 4.0% | 17% | – | – | 18% | 13% | 41% | – | 12% |
| John Zogby Strategies | May 18–20, 2022 | 408 (LV) | ± 5.0% | 17% | – | – | 35% | 12% | 25% | – | 11% |
| | May 4, 2022 | Gibson does not qualify for primary ballot | | | | | | | | | |
| Emerson College | May 1–3, 2022 | 192 (LV) | ± 7.0% | 16% | 3% | 1% | 18% | 8% | 26% | 10% (Note: "Someone else" with 9%, Lord with 1%) | 19% |
| | April 22, 2022 | Carpinelli withdraws from the race | | | | | | | | | |
| McLaughlin & Associates (R) | April 11–12, 2022 | 400 (LV) | ± 4.9% | 17% | – | – | 15% | 7% | 47% | – | 14% |
| John Zogby Strategies | April 10, 2022 | 267 (LV) | ± 6.1% | 15% | – | – | 29% | 11% | 28% | – | 17% |
| Emerson College | March 9–10, 2022 | 225 (LV) | ± 6.5% | 11% | 5% | 3% | 17% | 6% | 27% | 8% (Note: "Someone else" with 7%, Lord with 1%) | 23% |
| John Zogby Strategies | March 3, 2022 | 266 (LV) | ± 6.1% | 21% | 9% | – | 31% | 5% | 23% | – | 12% |
| Zogby Analytics | January 21–24, 2022 | 243 (LV) | ± 6.3% | 12% | 8% | 7% | 18% | – | 16% | 5% | 33% |
| John Zogby Strategies | January 20–21, 2022 | 251 (LV) | ± 6.3% | 13% | 4% | 5% | 26% | 2% | 28% | 2% (Note: Lord with 2%) | 21% |
| Poll source | Date(s) administered | Sample size | Margin of error | Rob Astorino | Andrew Giuliani | Harry Wilson | Lee Zeldin | Undecided | | | |
| McLaughlin & Associates (R) | April 11–12, 2022 | 400 (LV) | ± 4.9% | 20% | – | 9% | 53% | 18% | | | |
| McLaughlin & Associates (R) | April 11–12, 2022 | 400 (LV) | ± 4.9% | – | – | 13% | 64% | 24% | | | |

==== Results ====
Results by county Zeldin: 30–40%; 40–50%; 50–60%; 70–80%; Giuliani: 40–50%; 50–60%; Astorino: 30–40%; 40–50%; 50–60%; 60–70%; Wilson: 30–40%; 40–50%; 50–60%

Republican gubernatorial primary results
| Party | Candidate | Votes | % |
|---|---|---|---|
| Republican | Lee Zeldin | 196,874 | 43.62% |
| Republican | Andrew Giuliani | 103,267 | 22.88% |
| Republican | Rob Astorino | 84,464 | 18.71% |
| Republican | Harry Wilson | 66,736 | 14.79% |
| Total votes | | 451,341 | 100.0% |

=== Lieutenant governor ===
Zeldin selected Alison Esposito, an NYPD officer, as his running mate, and she won unopposed in the primary. Esposito is the first openly gay major party nominee for statewide office in New York.

==== Nominee ====
- Alison Esposito, former NYPD Deputy Inspector and commanding officer of Brooklyn's 70th Precinct

== Conservative primary ==
At the 2022 Conservative Party convention, the party endorsed Congressman Lee Zeldin for governor and NYPD deputy inspector Alison Esposito for lieutenant governor.

=== Governor ===
==== Designee ====
- Lee Zeldin, U.S. representative for NY-01 (2015–present), state senator from the 3rd district (2011–2014)

=== Lieutenant governor ===
==== Designee ====
- Alison Esposito, former New York City Police Department Deputy Inspector

== Working Families primary ==
On February 8, 2022, the Working Families Party endorsed New York City Public Advocate Jumaane Williams for the governorship. On February 28, 2022, the party announced that its preferred candidate for lieutenant governor was activist Ana Maria Archila.

Following Hochul and Delgado's respective wins in the Democratic gubernatorial and lieutenant gubernatorial primary, the party filed to put the two Democratic nominees on the Working Families ballot line.

=== Governor ===
==== Designee ====
- Kathy Hochul, incumbent governor (2021–present)

==== Withdrawn ====
- Jumaane Williams, New York City Public Advocate (2019–present); candidate for lieutenant governor of New York in 2018

=== Lieutenant governor ===
==== Designee ====
- Antonio Delgado, lieutenant governor (2022–present), former U.S. representative from New York's 19th congressional district (2019–2022)

==== Withdrawn ====
- Ana Maria Archila, executive director of Center for Popular Democracy and co-founder of Make the Road New York

== Other parties ==
In an unprecedented decision, the New York State Board of Elections rejected all petitions for non-qualified party ballot access in July 2022. Among the parties who submitted rejected petitions:

=== Libertarian Party ===
On February 16, 2022, Larry Sharpe, the Libertarian Party's candidate for governor of New York in 2018, officially announced his campaign to run for governor of New York on Kennedy. He received his party's nomination at the convention in Albany on February 19, 2022. In July 2022, the New York State Board of Elections disqualified Sharpe for not meeting the qualifications for ballot access.

==== Governor ====
===== Disqualified =====
- Larry Sharpe, activist, businessman and Libertarian nominee for governor in 2018; ran as a write-in candidate

===== Endorsements =====
Larry Sharpe (disqualified)

Individuals

- Andrew Yang, entrepreneur, founder of Venture for America, Democratic candidate for president of the United States in 2020 and for mayor of New York City in 2021 (Independent)

Organizations

- Forward Party

==== Lieutenant governor ====
===== Disqualified =====
- Andrew Hollister, Libertarian nominee for lieutenant governor in 2018

=== Green Party ===
On April 25, 2022, Howie Hawkins, who had run for numerous elected offices including Governor of New York, launched his campaign. In July 2022, the New York State Board of Elections disqualified Hawkins for not meeting the qualifications for ballot access.

==== Governor ====
===== Disqualified =====
- Howie Hawkins, party co-founder and Green/Socialist nominee for president of the United States in 2020; ran as a write-in candidate

==== Lieutenant governor ====
===== Disqualified =====
- Jia Lee, special education teacher

=== Additional parties ===
- Freedom Party – a petition was filed with the New York State Board of Elections with Skiboky Stora, a 2021 candidate for mayor of New York City, running for governor. On June 27, 2022, Stora's petition was ruled invalid at the New York State Board of Elections Commissioners' meeting. In July 2022, the Board of Elections rejected the party's petitions for ballot access.
- Independence Party of New York – a petition was filed with the New York State Board of Elections, with the Republican slate seeking to restore the Independence Party line. The party had lost ballot status in 2020. On July 14, 2022, the Board of Elections denied the petitions submitted by the Zeldin campaign, due to contested signatures.
- New Visions Party – a petition was filed with the New York State Board of Elections, with Carol Seidelman running for governor and Benjamin Azah running for lieutenant governor. In July 2022, the Board of Elections rejected the party's petitions for ballot access.
- Parent Party – a petition was filed with the New York State Board of Elections, with the Republican slate seeking to create the Parent Party line. The Parent Party endorsed Lee Zeldin and the Republican slate in May 2022. In July 2022, the Board of Elections rejected the party's petitions for ballot access.
- Unite Party – a petition was filed with the New York State Board of Elections, with Harry Wilson running for governor and John Bullis running for lieutenant governor. In July 2022, the Board of Elections rejected the party's petitions for ballot access.

== General election ==
=== Predictions ===
| Source | Ranking | As of |
|---|---|---|
| FiveThirtyEight | Solid D | August 26, 2022 |
| RealClearPolitics | Tossup | October 15, 2022 |
| Sabato's Crystal Ball | Likely D | October 19, 2022 |
| The Cook Political Report | Likely D | October 28, 2022 |
| Fox News | Lean D | November 1, 2022 |
| Inside Elections | Likely D | November 3, 2022 |
| Politico | Lean D | November 4, 2022 |
| Elections Daily | Safe D | November 7, 2022 |

=== Post-primary endorsements ===
Kathy Hochul (D)

U.S. presidents

- Joe Biden, 46th president of the United States (2021–2025), 47th vice president of the United States, former U.S. senator from Delaware (1973–2009)
- Bill Clinton, 42nd president of the United States (1993–2001), 40th and 42nd governor of Arkansas (1979–1981, 1983–1992), 50th attorney general of Arkansas (1977–1979)
- Barack Obama, 44th president of the United States (2009–2017), former U.S. senator from Illinois (2005–2008), former state senator from the 13th district

Local officials

- Ben Walsh, mayor of Syracuse (2018–present) (Independent)

Individuals

- Cher, singer and actress
- Leonardo DiCaprio, actor
- Mark Ruffalo, actor
- Amy Schumer, comedian
- Steven Spielberg, film director

Organizations

- Brady Campaign
- Giffords
- Sierra Club

Newspapers

- The Buffalo News
- The Post-Standard
- Suffolk News-Herald
- Times Union

Labor unions

- National Education Association
Lee Zeldin (R)

U.S. presidents

- Donald Trump, 45th president of the United States (2017–2021)

Executive officials

- David Friedman, United States Ambassador to Israel (2017–2021)
- Richard Grenell, Acting Director of National Intelligence (2020), United States Ambassador to Germany (2018–2020), and Special Presidential Envoy for Serbia and Kosovo Peace Negotiations (2019–2021)
- Anthony Scaramucci, White House Communications Director (2017)

U.S. representatives

- Tulsi Gabbard, U.S. representative for HI-02 (2013–2021), Vice Chair of the Democratic National Committee (2013–2016) (Independent)
- Newt Gingrich, 2012 Republican presidential candidate and former Speaker of the United States House of Representatives (1995–1999) and U.S. Representative (GA-06) (1979–1999)
- Steve Scalise, House Minority Whip (2019–present) and U.S. representative for LA-01 (2008–present)
- Joe Sempolinski, U.S. representative for NY-23 (2022–2023)
- Elise Stefanik, chair of the House Republican Conference (2021–present) and U.S. representative for NY-21 (2015–present)
- Claudia Tenney, U.S. representative for NY-22 (2021–present; 2017–2019)

State officials

- Ron DeSantis, governor of Florida (2019–present)
- George Pataki, governor of New York (1995–2006)
- Glenn Youngkin, governor of Virginia (2022–2026)

State legislators

- Fred Akshar, New York state senator from the 52nd district (2015–present)
- Rubén Díaz Sr., New York state senator from the 32nd district (2003–2017), New York City Councilman from the 18th district (2002–2003, 2018–2021) (Democrat)
- Dov Hikind, New York assemblyman from the 48th district (1983–2018) (Democrat)
- Stephen Kaufman, New York assemblyman from the 82nd district (1998–2004) (Democrat)

Local officials

- Rob Astorino, former Westchester County Executive, Republican nominee for governor in 2014, and former 2022 Republican gubernatorial candidate
- Joe Borelli, Minority Leader of the New York City Council (2021–present), Member of the New York City Council from the 51st district (2015–present)
- Rich David, former mayor of Binghamton, New York (2014–2021)
- Robert Holden, Member of the New York City Council from the 30th district (2018–present) (Democrat)

Individuals

- Robert Burck, also known as the Naked Cowboy, actor, singer, and Times Square street performer
- Robert Cherry, professor emeritus at Brooklyn College
- Bo Dietl, actor and retired police detective (Independent)
- Andrew Giuliani, political commentator and former 2022 Republican gubernatorial candidate
- Harriet Hageman, attorney and Republican nominee for WY-AL in the 2022 election
- Shmuel Kamenetsky, rabbi and dean
- Ronald Lauder, businessman, president of the World Jewish Congress (2007–present), United States Ambassador to Austria (1986–1987)
- Joe Pinion, entrepreneur, former television host, and Republican nominee in the 2022 United States Senate election in New York
- Nosson Scherman, rabbi and editor
- Curtis Sliwa, founder of the Guardian Angels, radio talk show host, and Republican nominee in the 2021 New York City mayoral election
- Harry Wilson, businessman, Republican nominee in the 2010 New York State Comptroller election, and former 2022 Republican gubernatorial candidate
- Donghui Zang, candidate for New York City's 29th City Council district in 2021 (Democrat)

Media

- National Review
- The New York Sun
- Queens County Beacon
- Vos Iz Neias?
- The Wall Street Journal

Organizations

- Fraternal Order of Police
- New Era Democrats
- New York Federation of College Republicans
- New York State Rifle and Pistol Association

Labor unions

- Nassau County Police Detectives Association
- Nassau County Police Superior Officers Association
- New York City Sergeants Benevolent Association
- New York State Law Enforcement Officers Union
- Police Conference of New York
- Suffolk County Police Benevolent Association
Howie Hawkins (G) (disqualified, ran as a write-in)

Individuals

- Paul Glover, author, professor, candidate for governor of Pennsylvania in 2014 and 2018
- Chris Hedges, journalist, minister, and author
- Gayle McLaughlin, mayor of Richmond, California (2007–2015) (Independent)
- Ralph Nader, activist, author, lecturer, attorney, and Presidential candidate in 1996, 2000, 2004, and 2008

Organizations

- Green Party of New York
- Socialist Alternative NYC
- Socialist Party USA
- Solidarity
No endorsement

Newspapers

- New York Daily News

=== Debate ===
2022 New York gubernatorial debate
| No. | Date | Host | Location | Moderator | Link | Republican | Democratic |
| Key: P Participant A Absent N Non-invitee I Invitee W Withdrawn | | | | | | | |
| Key: P Participant A Absent N Non-invitee I Invitee W Withdrawn | | | | | | Lee Zeldin | Kathy Hochul |
|---|---|---|---|---|---|---|---|
| 1 | Oct. 25, 2022 | Spectrum News | Pace University; Manhattan, New York | Errol Louis; Susan Arbetter | | P | P |

=== Polling ===
Aggregate polls

| Source of poll aggregation | Dates administered | Dates updated | Kathy Hochul (D) | Lee Zeldin (R) | Undecided (Note: Calculated by taking the difference of 100% and all other candidates combined.) | Margin |
|---|---|---|---|---|---|---|
| Real Clear Politics | October 26–31, 2022 | November 8, 2022 | 52.0% | 45.0% | 3.0% | Hochul +7.0 |
| FiveThirtyEight | October 20 – November 8, 2022 | November 8, 2022 | 51.7% | 43.9% | 4.4% | Hochul +7.8 |
| Average | | | 51.8% | 44.5% | 3.7% | Hochul +7.4 |

| Poll source | Date(s) administered | Sample size | Margin of error | Kathy Hochul (D) | Lee Zeldin (R) | Other | Undecided |
|---|---|---|---|---|---|---|---|
| Research Co. | November 4–6, 2022 | 450 (LV) | ± 4.6% | 49% | 41% | – | 11% |
| ActiVote (D) | August 8 – November 6, 2022 | 260 (LV) | ± 6.0% | 55% | 45% | – | – |
| Patriot Polling (R) | October 31 – November 3, 2022 | 826 (RV) | – | 49% | 44% | – | 7% |
| Emerson College (Note: Poll conducted for PIX11 and The Hill.) | October 28–31, 2022 | 1,000 (LV) | ± 3.0% | 52% | 44% | 1% (Note: "Someone else" with 1%) | 3% |
| Emerson College | October 28–31, 2022 | 1,000 (LV) | ± 3.0% | 54% | 45% | 2% (Note: "Someone else" with 2%) | – |
| The Trafalgar Group (R) | October 27–31, 2022 | 1,198 (LV) | ± 2.9% | 48% | 48% | – | 4% |
| KAConsulting (R) (Note: Poll conducted for Citizens United, a conservative non-profit organization.) | October 27–29, 2022 | 501 (LV) | ± 4.4% | 46% | 45% | 3% (Note: "Other/Refused" with 3%) | 5% |
| Data for Progress (D) | October 26–28, 2022 | 818 (LV) | ± 3.0% | 54% | 42% | – | 4% |
| Slingshot Strategies (D) | October 25–26, 2022 | 1,000 (LV) | ± 3.1% | 48% | 42% | – | 10% |
| Civiqs | October 22–25, 2022 | 593 (LV) | ± 5.0% | 54% | 43% | 2% (Note: "Someone else" with 2%) | 2% |
| Emerson College | October 20–24, 2022 | 1,000 (LV) | ± 3.0% | 50% | 44% | 2% (Note: "Someone else" with 2%) | 4% |
| Emerson College | October 20–24, 2022 | 1,000 (LV) | ± 3.0% | 52% | 44% | 4% (Note: "Someone else" with 4%) | – |
| Bold Decision | October 16–20, 2022 | 1,204 (LV) | ± 2.8% | 52% | 37% | – | 12% |
| co/efficient (R) | October 18–19, 2022 | 1,056 (LV) | ± 3.3% | 45% | 46% | – | 9% |
| SurveyUSA | October 14–18, 2022 | 702 (LV) | ± 5.4% | 47% | 41% | 4% | 8% |
| Quinnipiac University | October 12–16, 2022 | 1,617 (LV) | ± 2.4% | 50% | 46% | 1% (Note: "Someone else" with 1%) | 2% |
| Siena College | October 12–14, 2022 | 707 (LV) | ± 4.9% | 52% | 41% | 1% (Note: "Another candidate" with 1%; "Not going to vote" with 0%) | 6% |
| Marist College | October 3–6, 2022 | 900 (LV) | ± 4.4% | 52% | 44% | 1% (Note: "Another party's candidate" with 1%) | 3% |
| Marist College | October 3–6, 2022 | 1,117 (RV) | ± 4.0% | 51% | 41% | 1% (Note: "Another party's candidate" with 1%) | 7% |
| The Trafalgar Group (R) | September 30 – October 3, 2022 | 1,087 (LV) | ± 2.9% | 45% | 43% | 3% (Note: Sharpe (L) with 3%) | 10% |
| Siena College | September 16–25, 2022 | 655 (LV) | ± 3.9% | 54% | 37% | 2% (Note: "Another candidate" with 1%; "Not going to vote" with 1%) | 7% |
| Data for Progress (D) | September 9–13, 2022 | 931 (LV) | ± 3.0% | 52% | 39% | – | 9% |
| Public Policy Polling (D) (Note: Poll sponsored by the AFL-CIO) | September 8–9, 2022 | 510 (LV) | – | 54% | 39% | – | 7% |
| co/efficient (R) | September 5–7, 2022 | 1,194 (LV) | ± 3.3% | 49% | 43% | – | 8% |
| Emerson College | September 4–6, 2022 | 1,000 (LV) | ± 3.0% | 50% | 35% | 6% (Note: "Someone else" with 6%) | 9% |
| The Trafalgar Group/InsiderAdvantage (R) | August 31 – September 1, 2022 | 1,091 (LV) | ± 2.9% | 48% | 43% | 2% (Note: Sharpe (L) with 2%) | 7% |
| SurveyUSA | August 17–21, 2022 | 715 (LV) | ± 4.6% | 55% | 31% | – | 14% |
| Emerson College | July 26–28, 2022 | 1,000 (LV) | ± 3.0% | 51% | 35% | 7% | 7% |
| Siena College | July 24–28, 2022 | 806 (LV) | ± 3.5% | 53% | 39% | 0% | 7% |
| | July 7, 2022 | Sharpe is disqualified from the ballot | | | | | |
| SurveyUSA | June 15–20, 2022 | 2,152 (LV) | ± 2.8% | 52% | 28% | – | 20% |
| John Zogby Strategies | May 18–20, 2022 | 1,007 (LV) | ± 3.2% | 52% | 32% | 6% (Note: Sharpe (L) with 6%) | 10% |
| John Zogby Strategies | May 18–20, 2022 | 1,007 (LV) | ± 3.2% | 54% | 36% | – | 10% |
| John Zogby Strategies | April 10, 2022 | 1,001 (LV) | ± 3.2% | 49% | 34% | 3% (Note: Sharpe (L) with 3%) | 14% |
| Data for Progress (D) | March 30 – April 4, 2022 | 947 (LV) | ± 3.0% | 51% | 36% | – | 13% |
| McLaughlin & Associates (R) | March 9–11, 2022 | 800 (LV) | ± 3.4% | 44% | 46% | – | 11% |
| John Zogby Strategies | March 3, 2022 | 1,003 (LV) | ± 3.2% | 47% | 33% | 6% (Note: Sharpe (L) with 6%) | 14% |
| John Zogby Strategies | March 3, 2022 | 1,003 (LV) | ± 3.2% | 50% | 35% | – | 15% |
| Zogby Analytics | January 21–24, 2022 | 869 (LV) | ± 3.3% | 44% | 27% | 6% (Note: Sharpe (L) with 6%) | 23% |
| John Zogby Strategies | January 20–21, 2022 | 1,000 (LV) | ± 3.2% | 50% | 29% | 6% (Note: Sharpe (L) with 6%) | 15% |
| John Zogby Strategies | January 20–21, 2022 | 1,000 (LV) | ± 3.2% | 51% | 33% | – | 16% |

Hypothetical polling

Kathy Hochul vs. Rob Astorino

| Poll source | Date(s) administered | Sample size | Margin of error | Kathy Hochul (D) | Rob Astorino (R) | Larry Sharpe (L) | Undecided |
|---|---|---|---|---|---|---|---|
| SurveyUSA | June 15–20, 2022 | 2,152 (LV) | ± 2.7% | 55% | 28% | – | 17% |
| John Zogby Strategies | May 18–20, 2022 | 1,007 (LV) | ± 3.2% | 54% | 35% | – | 11% |
| John Zogby Strategies | April 10, 2022 | 1,001 (LV) | ± 3.2% | 51% | 34% | – | 16% |
| John Zogby Strategies | March 3, 2022 | 1,003 (LV) | ± 3.2% | 49% | 35% | – | 16% |
| Zogby Analytics | January 21–24, 2022 | 869 (LV) | ± 3.3% | 45% | 27% | 6% | 22% |

Kathy Hochul vs. Andrew Giuliani

| Poll source | Date(s) administered | Sample size | Margin of error | Kathy Hochul (D) | Andrew Giuliani (R) | Undecided |
|---|---|---|---|---|---|---|
| SurveyUSA | June 15–20, 2022 | 2,152 (LV) | ± 2.7% | 56% | 30% | 15% |
| John Zogby Strategies | May 18–20, 2022 | 1,007 (LV) | ± 3.2% | 54% | 35% | 11% |
| John Zogby Strategies | March 3, 2022 | 1,003 (LV) | ± 3.2% | 52% | 33% | 15% |

Kathy Hochul vs. Harry Wilson

| Poll source | Date(s) administered | Sample size | Margin of error | Kathy Hochul (D) | Harry Wilson (R) | Larry Sharpe (L) | Undecided |
|---|---|---|---|---|---|---|---|
| SurveyUSA | June 15–20, 2022 | 2,152 (LV) | ± 2.8% | 54% | 29% | – | 17% |
| John Zogby Strategies | May 18–20, 2022 | 1,007 (LV) | ± 3.2% | 51% | 32% | 5% | 12% |
| John Zogby Strategies | May 18–20, 2022 | 1,007 (LV) | ± 3.2% | 53% | 36% | – | 11% |
| John Zogby Strategies | April 10, 2022 | 1,001 (LV) | ± 3.2% | 50% | 30% | 4% | 16% |
| John Zogby Strategies | April 10, 2022 | 1,001 (LV) | ± 3.2% | 51% | 32% | – | 17% |
| John Zogby Strategies | March 3, 2022 | 1,003 (LV) | ± 3.2% | 50% | 34% | – | 16% |

Tom Suozzi vs. Harry Wilson

| Poll source | Date(s) administered | Sample size | Margin of error | Tom Suozzi (D) | Harry Wilson (R) | Undecided |
|---|---|---|---|---|---|---|
| John Zogby Strategies | May 18–20, 2022 | 1,007 (LV) | ± 3.2% | 50% | 34% | 17% |
| John Zogby Strategies | April 10, 2022 | 1,001 (LV) | ± 3.2% | 45% | 31% | 24% |
| John Zogby Strategies | March 3, 2022 | 1,003 (LV) | ± 3.2% | 44% | 32% | 25% |

Tom Suozzi vs. Lee Zeldin

| Poll source | Date(s) administered | Sample size | Margin of error | Tom Suozzi (D) | Lee Zeldin (R) | Undecided |
|---|---|---|---|---|---|---|
| John Zogby Strategies | May 18–20, 2022 | 1,007 (LV) | ± 3.2% | 48% | 36% | 16% |
| John Zogby Strategies | March 3, 2022 | 1,003 (LV) | ± 3.2% | 43% | 34% | 23% |

Jumaane Williams vs. Rob Astorino

| Poll source | Date(s) administered | Sample size | Margin of error | Jumaane Williams (D) | Rob Astorino (R) | Undecided |
|---|---|---|---|---|---|---|
| John Zogby Strategies | May 18–20, 2022 | 1,007 (LV) | ± 3.2% | 48% | 36% | 17% |
| John Zogby Strategies | April 10, 2022 | 1,001 (LV) | ± 3.2% | 43% | 33% | 24% |
| John Zogby Strategies | March 3, 2022 | 1,003 (LV) | ± 3.2% | 43% | 35% | 22% |

Jumaane Williams vs. Andrew Giuliani

| Poll source | Date(s) administered | Sample size | Margin of error | Jumaane Williams (D) | Andrew Giuliani (R) | Undecided |
|---|---|---|---|---|---|---|
| John Zogby Strategies | May 18–20, 2022 | 1,007 (LV) | ± 3.2% | 49% | 36% | 15% |
| John Zogby Strategies | April 10, 2022 | 1,001 (LV) | ± 3.2% | 45% | 35% | 20% |
| John Zogby Strategies | March 3, 2022 | 1,003 (LV) | ± 3.2% | 46% | 33% | 22% |

Jumaane Williams vs. Harry Wilson

| Poll source | Date(s) administered | Sample size | Margin of error | Jumaane Williams (D) | Harry Wilson (R) | Undecided |
|---|---|---|---|---|---|---|
| John Zogby Strategies | May 18–20, 2022 | 1,007 (LV) | ± 3.2% | 45% | 37% | 18% |
| John Zogby Strategies | April 10, 2022 | 1,001 (LV) | ± 3.2% | 41% | 34% | 25% |
| John Zogby Strategies | March 3, 2022 | 1,003 (LV) | ± 3.2% | 42% | 34% | 24% |

Jumaane Williams vs. Lee Zeldin

| Poll source | Date(s) administered | Sample size | Margin of error | Jumaane Williams (D) | Lee Zeldin (R) | Undecided |
|---|---|---|---|---|---|---|
| John Zogby Strategies | May 18–20, 2022 | 1,007 (LV) | ± 3.2% | 47% | 37% | 16% |
| John Zogby Strategies | April 10, 2022 | 1,001 (LV) | ± 3.2% | 43% | 36% | 21% |
| John Zogby Strategies | March 3, 2022 | 1,003 (LV) | ± 3.2% | 43% | 36% | 22% |

Andrew Cuomo vs. Rob Astorino

| Poll source | Date(s) administered | Sample size | Margin of error | Andrew Cuomo (D) | Rob Astorino (R) | Larry Sharpe (L) | Undecided |
|---|---|---|---|---|---|---|---|
| Zogby Analytics | January 21–24, 2022 | 869 (LV) | ± 3.3% | 34% | 31% | 7% | 28% |

Andrew Cuomo vs. Elise Stefanik

| Poll source | Date(s) administered | Sample size | Margin of error | Andrew Cuomo (D) | Elise Stefanik (R) | Undecided |
|---|---|---|---|---|---|---|
| Zogby Analytics | February 3–5, 2021 | 810 (LV) | ± 3.4% | 49% | 37% | 14% |

Andrew Cuomo vs. Lee Zeldin

| Poll source | Date(s) administered | Sample size | Margin of error | Andrew Cuomo (D) | Lee Zeldin (R) | Larry Sharpe (L) | Undecided |
|---|---|---|---|---|---|---|---|
| Trafalgar Group (R) | October 27–31, 2022 | 1198 (LV) | ± 2.9% | 55% | 45% | – | – |
| Data for Progress (D) | March 30 – April 4, 2022 | 947 (LV) | ± 3.0% | 44% | 41% | – | 15% |
| Zogby Analytics | January 21–24, 2022 | 869 (LV) | ± 3.3% | 34% | 31% | 7% | 28% |

Alexandria Ocasio-Cortez vs. Elise Stefanik

| Poll source | Date(s) administered | Sample size | Margin of error | Alexandria Ocasio-Cortez (D) | Elise Stefanik (R) | Undecided |
|---|---|---|---|---|---|---|
| Zogby Analytics | February 3–5, 2021 | 810 (LV) | ± 3.4% | 48% | 40% | 12% |

Andrew Cuomo vs. generic Republican

| Poll source | Date(s) administered | Sample size | Margin of error | Andrew Cuomo (D) | Generic Republican | Undecided |
|---|---|---|---|---|---|---|
| Siena College | May 16–20, 2021 | 793 (RV) | ± 4% | 48% | 38% | 14% |

Letitia James vs. generic Republican

| Poll source | Date(s) administered | Sample size | Margin of error | Letitia James (D) | Generic Republican | Undecided |
|---|---|---|---|---|---|---|
| Siena College | May 16–20, 2021 | 793 (RV) | ± 4% | 46% | 29% | 25% |

Generic Democrat vs. generic Republican

| Poll source | Date(s) administered | Sample size | Margin of error | Generic Democrat | Generic Republican | Undecided |
|---|---|---|---|---|---|---|
| Siena College | May 16–20, 2021 | 793 (RV) | ± 4% | 55% | 29% | 16% |

Generic Democrat vs. generic Republican with Andrew Cuomo as an independent

| Poll source | Date(s) administered | Sample size | Margin of error | Generic Democrat | Generic Republican | Andrew Cuomo (I) | Undecided |
|---|---|---|---|---|---|---|---|
| Emerson College | May 1–3, 2022 | 1,000 (RV) | ± 3.0% | 33% | 33% | 16% | 18% |
| Emerson College | March 9–10, 2022 | 1,000 (RV) | ± 3.0% | 39% | 33% | 12% | 17% |

Kathy Hochul vs. generic opponent

| Poll source | Date(s) administered | Sample size | Margin of error | Kathy Hochul (D) | Generic Opponent | Undecided |
|---|---|---|---|---|---|---|
| Siena College | June 7–13, 2022 | 802 (RV) | ± 3.9% | 46% | 44% | 10% |
| Siena College | April 18–21, 2022 | 806 (RV) | ± 3.9% | 40% | 45% | 15% |
| Siena College | March 20–24, 2022 | 804 (RV) | ± 4.2% | 43% | 43% | 14% |
| Siena College | February 14–17, 2022 | 803 (RV) | ± 3.9% | 47% | 38% | 15% |

Antonio Delgado vs. Alison Esposito (Note: This poll was conducted as a lieutenant governor poll, but is included here due to the candidates running on the same ticket.)

| Poll source | Date(s) administered | Sample size | Margin of error | Antonio Delgado (D) | Alison Esposito (R) | Undecided |
|---|---|---|---|---|---|---|
| Data for Progress (D) | October 26–28, 2022 | 818 (LV) | ± 3.0% | 52% | 41% | 7% |

=== Results ===
2022 New York gubernatorial election
| Party | Candidate | Votes | % | ±% |
|---|---|---|---|---|
| Democratic | Kathy Hochul; Antonio Delgado | 2,879,092 | 48.70% | −7.39% |
| Working Families | Kathy Hochul; Antonio Delgado | 261,323 | 4.42% | +2.54% |
| Total | Kathy Hochul (incumbent); Antonio Delgado (incumbent) | 3,140,415 | 53.12% | −6.43% |
| Republican | Lee Zeldin; Alison Esposito | 2,449,394 | 41.43% | +9.87% |
| Conservative | Lee Zeldin; Alison Esposito | 313,187 | 5.30% | +1.14% |
| Total | Lee Zeldin; Alison Esposito | 2,762,581 | 46.73% | +10.57% |
| Write-in | | 9,290 | 0.16% | +0.04% |
| Total votes | | 5,912,286 | 100.00% | N/A |
| Democratic hold | | | | |

==== By county ====
By county

| County | Kathy Hochul | | | | | | Lee Zeldin | | | | | | Margin | | Total votes |
| County | Democratic | | WFP | | Total | | Republican | | Conservative | | Total | | Margin | | Total votes |
| County | # | % | # | % | # | % | # | % | # | % | # | % | # | % | Total votes |
|---|---|---|---|---|---|---|---|---|---|---|---|---|---|---|---|
| Albany | 62,327 | 53.46 | 6,708 | 5.75 | 69,035 | 59.22 | 40,416 | 34.67 | 7,129 | 6.12 | 47,545 | 40.78 | 21,490 | 18.43 | 116,580 |
| Allegany | 3,613 | 22.81 | 255 | 1.61 | 3,868 | 24.42 | 10,862 | 68.56 | 1,112 | 7.02 | 11,974 | 75.58 | -8,106 | -51.17 | 15,842 |
| Bronx | 148,131 | 73.88 | 7,433 | 3.71 | 155,564 | 77.58 | 41,685 | 20.79 | 3,263 | 1.63 | 44,948 | 22.42 | 110,616 | 55.17 | 200,512 |
| Broome | 27,272 | 40.02 | 2,527 | 3.71 | 29,799 | 43.73 | 34,542 | 50.69 | 3,801 | 5.58 | 38,343 | 56.27 | -8,544 | -12.54 | 68,142 |
| Cattaraugus | 7,291 | 27.98 | 504 | 1.93 | 7,795 | 29.91 | 16,219 | 62.24 | 2,046 | 7.85 | 18,265 | 70.09 | -10,470 | -40.18 | 26,060 |
| Cayuga | 9,505 | 35.33 | 670 | 2.49 | 10,175 | 37.83 | 14,465 | 53.77 | 2,260 | 8.40 | 16,725 | 62.17 | -6,550 | -24.35 | 26,900 |
| Chautauqua | 14,180 | 32.59 | 1,057 | 2.43 | 15,237 | 35.02 | 24,668 | 56.70 | 3,600 | 8.27 | 28,268 | 64.98 | -13,031 | -29.95 | 43,505 |
| Chemung | 8,998 | 32.32 | 476 | 1.71 | 9,474 | 34.03 | 16,781 | 60.28 | 1,583 | 5.69 | 18,364 | 65.97 | -8,890 | -31.93 | 27,838 |
| Chenango | 4,623 | 27.45 | 345 | 2.05 | 4,968 | 29.50 | 10,911 | 64.80 | 960 | 5.70 | 11,871 | 70.50 | -6,903 | -40.99 | 16,839 |
| Clinton | 11,124 | 40.47 | 770 | 2.80 | 11,894 | 43.28 | 14,223 | 51.75 | 1,367 | 4.97 | 15,590 | 56.72 | -3,696 | -13.45 | 27,484 |
| Columbia | 14,400 | 48.51 | 1,679 | 5.66 | 16,079 | 54.17 | 11,697 | 39.41 | 1,908 | 6.43 | 13,605 | 45.83 | 2,474 | 8.33 | 29,684 |
| Cortland | 6,299 | 39.11 | 513 | 3.19 | 6,812 | 42.29 | 8,349 | 51.84 | 945 | 5.87 | 9,294 | 57.71 | -2,482 | -15.41 | 16,106 |
| Delaware | 5,869 | 31.58 | 621 | 3.34 | 6,490 | 34.92 | 11,076 | 59.60 | 1,019 | 5.48 | 12,095 | 65.08 | -5,605 | -30.16 | 18,585 |
| Dutchess | 50,967 | 44.32 | 4,552 | 3.96 | 55,519 | 48.28 | 52,803 | 45.91 | 6,683 | 5.81 | 59,486 | 51.72 | -3,967 | -3.45 | 115,005 |
| Erie | 166,539 | 48.89 | 14,087 | 4.14 | 180,626 | 53.03 | 128,008 | 37.58 | 31,996 | 9.39 | 160,004 | 46.97 | 20,622 | 6.05 | 340,630 |
| Essex | 6,484 | 41.79 | 508 | 3.27 | 6,992 | 45.07 | 7,878 | 50.78 | 644 | 4.15 | 8,522 | 54.93 | -1,530 | -9.86 | 15,514 |
| Franklin | 5,628 | 37.07 | 375 | 2.47 | 6,003 | 39.54 | 8,385 | 55.23 | 795 | 5.24 | 9,180 | 60.46 | -3,177 | -20.92 | 15,183 |
| Fulton | 4,915 | 26.08 | 340 | 1.80 | 5,255 | 27.88 | 12,342 | 65.49 | 1,249 | 6.63 | 13,591 | 72.12 | -8,336 | -44.23 | 18,846 |
| Genesee | 5,823 | 26.14 | 451 | 2.02 | 6,274 | 28.16 | 13,558 | 60.86 | 2,445 | 10.98 | 16,003 | 71.84 | -9,729 | -43.67 | 22,277 |
| Greene | 6,730 | 33.41 | 921 | 4.57 | 7,651 | 37.98 | 10,722 | 53.23 | 1,770 | 8.79 | 12,492 | 62.02 | -4,841 | -24.03 | 20,143 |
| Hamilton | 770 | 26.72 | 61 | 2.12 | 831 | 28.83 | 1,871 | 64.92 | 180 | 6.25 | 2,051 | 71.17 | -1,220 | -42.33 | 2,882 |
| Herkimer | 5,389 | 24.19 | 364 | 1.63 | 5,753 | 25.82 | 14,984 | 67.25 | 1,545 | 6.93 | 16,529 | 74.18 | -10,776 | -48.36 | 22,282 |
| Jefferson | 8,690 | 27.39 | 514 | 1.62 | 9,204 | 29.01 | 20,488 | 64.58 | 2,035 | 6.41 | 22,523 | 70.99 | -13,319 | -41.98 | 31,727 |
| Kings | 340,206 | 60.16 | 61,908 | 10.95 | 402,114 | 71.10 | 151,740 | 26.83 | 11,690 | 2.07 | 163,430 | 28.90 | 238,684 | 42.20 | 565,544 |
| Lewis | 1,933 | 18.15 | 135 | 1.27 | 2,068 | 19.42 | 7,876 | 73.97 | 704 | 6.61 | 8,580 | 80.58 | -6,512 | -61.16 | 10,648 |
| Livingston | 7,551 | 31.07 | 585 | 2.41 | 8,136 | 33.48 | 13,922 | 57.28 | 2,246 | 9.24 | 16,168 | 66.52 | -8,032 | -33.05 | 24,304 |
| Madison | 9,438 | 36.07 | 754 | 2.88 | 10,192 | 38.95 | 13,693 | 52.34 | 2,279 | 8.71 | 15,972 | 61.05 | -5,780 | -22.09 | 26,164 |
| Monroe | 137,598 | 49.97 | 11,153 | 4.05 | 148,751 | 54.02 | 105,694 | 38.38 | 20,943 | 7.60 | 126,637 | 45.98 | 22,114 | 8.03 | 275,388 |
| Montgomery | 4,708 | 29.64 | 320 | 2.01 | 5,028 | 31.65 | 9,457 | 59.53 | 1,401 | 8.82 | 10,858 | 68.35 | -5,830 | -36.70 | 15,886 |
| Nassau | 222,305 | 42.90 | 9,731 | 1.88 | 232,036 | 44.78 | 264,736 | 51.09 | 21,411 | 4.13 | 286,147 | 55.22 | -54,111 | -10.44 | 518,183 |
| New York | 336,737 | 74.45 | 35,412 | 7.83 | 372,149 | 82.28 | 74,592 | 16.49 | 5,567 | 1.23 | 80,159 | 17.72 | 291,990 | 64.56 | 452,308 |
| Niagara | 27,791 | 36.43 | 1,878 | 2.46 | 29,669 | 38.89 | 38,338 | 50.25 | 8,289 | 10.86 | 46,627 | 61.11 | -16,958 | -22.23 | 76,296 |
| Oneida | 23,658 | 31.40 | 1,700 | 2.26 | 25,358 | 33.65 | 44,685 | 59.30 | 5,306 | 7.04 | 49,991 | 66.35 | -24,633 | -32.69 | 75,349 |
| Onondaga | 85,144 | 50.19 | 6,266 | 3.69 | 91,410 | 53.88 | 66,148 | 38.99 | 12,091 | 7.13 | 78,239 | 46.12 | 13,171 | 7.76 | 169,649 |
| Ontario | 18,945 | 41.06 | 1,221 | 2.65 | 20,166 | 43.70 | 22,154 | 48.01 | 3,825 | 8.29 | 25,979 | 56.30 | -5,813 | -12.60 | 46,145 |
| Orange | 51,397 | 41.47 | 2,989 | 2.41 | 54,386 | 43.88 | 62,845 | 50.70 | 6,713 | 5.42 | 69,558 | 56.12 | -15,172 | -12.24 | 123,944 |
| Orleans | 3,086 | 22.58 | 206 | 1.51 | 3,292 | 24.09 | 8,988 | 65.76 | 1,388 | 10.16 | 10,376 | 75.91 | -7,084 | -51.83 | 13,668 |
| Oswego | 12,217 | 30.38 | 898 | 2.23 | 13,115 | 32.62 | 23,935 | 59.53 | 3,159 | 7.86 | 27,094 | 67.38 | -13,979 | -34.77 | 40,209 |
| Otsego | 8,104 | 36.75 | 691 | 3.13 | 8,795 | 39.89 | 11,833 | 53.66 | 1,422 | 6.45 | 13,255 | 60.11 | -4,460 | -20.23 | 22,050 |
| Putnam | 15,108 | 36.57 | 1,305 | 3.16 | 16,413 | 39.73 | 22,195 | 53.73 | 2,703 | 6.54 | 24,898 | 60.27 | -8,485 | -20.54 | 41,311 |
| Queens | 252,652 | 57.74 | 24,628 | 5.63 | 277,280 | 63.37 | 148,466 | 33.93 | 11,813 | 2.70 | 160,279 | 36.63 | 117,001 | 26.74 | 437,559 |
| Rensselaer | 25,411 | 40.81 | 3,110 | 4.99 | 28,521 | 45.80 | 27,702 | 44.49 | 6,047 | 9.71 | 33,749 | 54.20 | -5,228 | -8.40 | 62,270 |
| Richmond | 44,481 | 31.56 | 2,654 | 1.88 | 47,135 | 33.44 | 87,263 | 61.91 | 6,555 | 4.65 | 93,818 | 66.56 | -46,683 | -33.12 | 140,953 |
| Rockland | 45,258 | 41.57 | 2,596 | 2.38 | 47,854 | 43.95 | 51,462 | 47.27 | 9,556 | 8.78 | 61,018 | 56.05 | -13,164 | -12.09 | 108,872 |
| Saratoga | 45,052 | 43.32 | 3,131 | 3.01 | 48,183 | 46.33 | 48,463 | 46.60 | 7,361 | 7.08 | 55,824 | 53.67 | -7,641 | -7.35 | 104,007 |
| Schenectady | 25,310 | 46.52 | 2,322 | 4.27 | 27,632 | 50.79 | 22,557 | 41.46 | 4,215 | 7.75 | 26,772 | 49.21 | 860 | 1.58 | 54,404 |
| Schoharie | 3,560 | 27.74 | 363 | 2.83 | 3,923 | 30.57 | 7,651 | 59.62 | 1,259 | 9.81 | 8,910 | 69.43 | -4,987 | -38.86 | 12,833 |
| Schuyler | 2,436 | 31.42 | 225 | 2.90 | 2,661 | 34.32 | 4,613 | 59.50 | 479 | 6.18 | 5,092 | 65.68 | -2,431 | -31.36 | 7,753 |
| Seneca | 4,226 | 36.58 | 325 | 2.81 | 4,551 | 39.39 | 6,267 | 54.25 | 735 | 6.36 | 7,002 | 60.61 | -2,451 | -21.22 | 11,553 |
| St. Lawrence | 10,811 | 31.54 | 780 | 2.28 | 11,591 | 33.81 | 20,167 | 58.83 | 2,520 | 7.35 | 22,687 | 66.19 | -11,096 | -32.37 | 34,278 |
| Steuben | 9,053 | 26.20 | 613 | 1.77 | 9,666 | 27.98 | 22,815 | 66.03 | 2,071 | 5.99 | 24,886 | 72.02 | -15,220 | -44.05 | 34,552 |
| Suffolk | 223,688 | 39.52 | 12,048 | 2.13 | 235,736 | 41.64 | 289,077 | 51.07 | 41,260 | 7.29 | 330,337 | 58.36 | -94,601 | -16.71 | 566,073 |
| Sullivan | 8,912 | 35.98 | 847 | 3.42 | 9,759 | 39.40 | 13,363 | 53.95 | 1,646 | 6.65 | 15,009 | 60.60 | -5,250 | -21.20 | 24,768 |
| Tioga | 5,723 | 30.14 | 394 | 2.07 | 6,117 | 32.22 | 11,863 | 62.48 | 1,008 | 5.31 | 12,871 | 67.78 | -6,754 | -35.57 | 18,988 |
| Tompkins | 20,685 | 59.19 | 4,634 | 13.26 | 25,319 | 72.45 | 8,639 | 24.72 | 991 | 2.84 | 9,630 | 27.55 | 15,689 | 44.89 | 34,949 |
| Ulster | 38,207 | 49.03 | 6,376 | 8.18 | 44,583 | 57.21 | 28,938 | 37.13 | 4,409 | 5.66 | 33,347 | 42.79 | 11,236 | 14.42 | 77,930 |
| Warren | 11,601 | 41.23 | 772 | 2.74 | 12,373 | 43.98 | 14,131 | 50.23 | 1,630 | 5.79 | 15,761 | 56.02 | -3,388 | -12.04 | 28,134 |
| Washington | 7,361 | 33.31 | 585 | 2.65 | 7,946 | 35.95 | 12,655 | 57.26 | 1,500 | 6.79 | 14,155 | 64.05 | -6,209 | -28.09 | 22,101 |
| Wayne | 10,074 | 29.95 | 740 | 2.20 | 10,814 | 32.15 | 19,081 | 56.73 | 3,742 | 11.12 | 22,823 | 67.85 | -12,009 | -35.70 | 33,637 |
| Westchester | 187,342 | 57.08 | 10,860 | 3.31 | 198,202 | 60.38 | 119,352 | 36.36 | 10,683 | 3.25 | 130,035 | 39.62 | 68,167 | 20.77 | 328,237 |
| Wyoming | 3,041 | 19.91 | 251 | 1.64 | 3,292 | 21.56 | 10,376 | 67.95 | 1,602 | 10.49 | 11,978 | 78.44 | -8,686 | -56.88 | 15,270 |
| Yates | 2,715 | 32.86 | 186 | 2.25 | 2,901 | 35.11 | 4,729 | 57.23 | 633 | 7.66 | 5,362 | 64.89 | -2,461 | -29.78 | 8,263 |
| Totals | 2,879,092 | 48.77 | 261,323 | 4.43 | 3,140,415 | 53.20 | 2,449,394 | 41.49 | 313,187 | 5.31 | 2,762,581 | 46.80 | 377,834 | 6.40 | 5,902,996 |

Counties that flipped from Republican to Democratic

- Columbia (largest municipality: Hudson)
- Schenectady (largest municipality: Schenectady)

Counties that flipped from Democratic to Republican

- Nassau (largest municipality: Town of Hempstead)
- Richmond (coterminous with New York City's borough of Staten Island)
- Rockland (largest municipality: New City)
- Suffolk (largest municipality: Brookhaven)

==== New York City results ====
| 2022 gubernatorial election in New York City | | Manhattan | The Bronx | Brooklyn | Queens | Staten Island | Total | |
| Democratic- Working Families | Kathy Hochul | 372,149 | 155,564 | 402,114 | 277,280 | 47,135 | 1,254,242 | 69.8% |
| Democratic- Working Families | Kathy Hochul | 82.3% | 77.6% | 71.1% | 63.4% | 33.4% | 1,254,242 | 69.8% |
| Republican- Conservative | Lee Zeldin | 80,159 | 44,948 | 163,430 | 160,279 | 93,818 | 542,634 | 30.2% |
| Republican- Conservative | Lee Zeldin | 17.7% | 22.4% | 28.9% | 36.6% | 66.6% | 542,634 | 30.2% |

===== By New York City council district =====
2022 New York gubernatorial election New York City Council map

Hochul won 42 of 51 city council districts, while Zeldin won 9 of 51 city council districts, including three held by Democrats.

| District | Hochul | Zeldin | City-Council member |
|---|---|---|---|
| 1st | 76.7% | 23.2% | Christopher Marte |
| 2nd | 83.0% | 16.8% | Carlina Rivera |
| 3rd | 84.0% | 15.8% | Erik Bottcher |
| 4th | 73.1% | 26.7% | Keith Powers |
| 5th | 77.2% | 22.7% | Julie Menin |
| 6th | 85.1% | 14.8% | Gale Brewer |
| 7th | 88.6% | 11.2% | Shaun Abreu |
| 8th | 84.8% | 15.1% | Diana Ayala |
| 9th | 92.9% | 6.9% | Kristin Richardson Jordan |
| 10th | 82.2% | 17.7% | Carmen De La Rosa |
| 11th | 74.4% | 25.5% | Eric Dinowitz |
| 12th | 90.3% | 9.7% | Kevin Riley |
| 13th | 53.1% | 46.9% | Marjorie Velázquez |
| 14th | 78.3% | 21.7% | Pierina Sanchez |
| 15th | 80.7% | 19.2% | Oswald Feliz |
| 16th | 84.8% | 15.2% | Althea Stevens |
| 17th | 83.1% | 16.8% | Rafael Salamanca |
| 18th | 86.7% | 12.6% | Amanda Farías |
| 19th | 43.0% | 57.0% | Vickie Paladino |
| 20th | 50.1% | 49.9% | Sandra Ung |
| 21st | 70.1% | 29.9% | Francisco Moya |
| 22nd | 70.9% | 29.0% | Tiffany Cabán |
| 23rd | 59.4% | 40.6% | Linda Lee |
| 24th | 56.0% | 44.0% | James F. Gennaro |
| 25th | 66.6% | 33.3% | Shekar Krishnan |
| 26th | 75.9% | 24.0% | Julie Won |
| 27th | 91.2% | 8.8% | Nantasha Williams |
| 28th | 81.7% | 18.3% | Adrienne Adams |
| 29th | 60.3% | 39.6% | Lynn Schulman |
| 30th | 42.0% | 58.0% | Robert Holden |
| 31st | 82.2% | 17.8% | Selvena Brooks-Powers |
| 32nd | 41.6% | 58.4% | Joann Ariola |
| 33rd | 74.3% | 25.6% | Lincoln Restler |
| 34th | 84.8% | 15.2% | Jennifer Gutiérrez |
| 35th | 90.0% | 9.9% | Crystal Hudson |
| 36th | 94.2% | 5.6% | Chi Ossé |
| 37th | 84.9% | 15.1% | Sandy Nurse |
| 38th | 69.8% | 30.1% | Alexa Avilés |
| 39th | 83.0% | 16.9% | Shahana Hanif |
| 40th | 91.0% | 8.9% | Rita Joseph |
| 41st | 92.1% | 7.9% | Darlene Mealy |
| 42nd | 91.7% | 8.3% | Charles Barron |
| 43rd | 47.5% | 52.4% | Justin Brannan |
| 44th | 15.2% | 84.8% | Kalman Yeger |
| 45th | 76.2% | 23.8% | Farah Louis |
| 46th | 65.3% | 34.7% | Mercedes Narcisse |
| 47th | 36.7% | 63.3% | Ari Kagan |
| 48th | 26.7% | 73.2% | Inna Vernikov |
| 49th | 58.9% | 41.1% | Kamillah Hanks |
| 50th | 29.7% | 70.3% | Steven Matteo |
| 51st | 19.3% | 80.6% | Joe Borelli |

==== By congressional district ====
Hochul won 14 of 26 congressional districts, with the remaining 12 going to Zeldin, including one that elected a Democrat.

| District | Hochul | Zeldin | Representative |
|---|---|---|---|
| 1st | 43% | 57% | Lee Zeldin (117th Congress) |
| 1st | 43% | 57% | Nick LaLota (118th Congress) |
| 2nd | 39% | 61% | Andrew Garbarino |
| 3rd | 44% | 56% | Tom Suozzi (117th Congress) |
| 3rd | 44% | 56% | George Santos (118th Congress) |
| 4th | 47% | 53% | Kathleen Rice (117th Congress) |
| 4th | 47% | 53% | Anthony D'Esposito (118th Congress) |
| 5th | 73% | 27% | Gregory Meeks |
| 6th | 55% | 45% | Grace Meng |
| 7th | 76% | 24% | Nydia Velázquez |
| 8th | 69% | 30% | Hakeem Jeffries |
| 9th | 68% | 32% | Yvette Clarke |
| 10th | 81% | 19% | Jerry Nadler (117th Congress) |
| 10th | 81% | 19% | Dan Goldman (118th Congress) |
| 11th | 36% | 64% | Nicole Malliotakis |
| 12th | 80% | 20% | Carolyn Maloney (117th Congress) |
| 12th | 80% | 20% | Jerry Nadler (118th Congress) |
| 13th | 86% | 14% | Adriano Espaillat |
| 14th | 70% | 30% | Alexandria Ocasio-Cortez |
| 15th | 80% | 20% | Ritchie Torres |
| 16th | 64% | 36% | Jamaal Bowman |
| 17th | 48% | 52% | Mondaire Jones (117th Congress) |
| 17th | 48% | 52% | Mike Lawler (118th Congress) |
| 18th | 49% | 51% | Sean Patrick Maloney (117th Congress) |
| 18th | 49% | 51% | Pat Ryan (118th Congress) |
| 19th | 47% | 53% | Pat Ryan (117th Congress) |
| 19th | 47% | 53% | Marc Molinaro (118th Congress) |
| 20th | 53% | 47% | Paul Tonko |
| 21st | 36% | 64% | Elise Stefanik |
| 22nd | 47% | 53% | Claudia Tenney (117th Congress) |
| 22nd | 47% | 53% | Brandon Williams (118th Congress) |
| 23rd | 36% | 64% | Joe Sempolinski (117th Congress) |
| 23rd | 36% | 64% | Nick Langworthy (118th Congress) |
| 24th | 34% | 66% | John Katko (117th Congress) |
| 24th | 34% | 66% | Claudia Tenney (118th Congress) |
| 25th | 53% | 47% | Joe Morelle |
| 26th | 57% | 43% | Brian Higgins |

== Analysis ==
In 2022, New York was a solidly Democratic state where Republicans had not won a statewide election since the 2002 election for governor of New York. The main focus of the election was crime. Zeldin accused Hochul of being weak on crime, promising to declare a statewide crime emergency and to repeal cashless bail, while Hochul attacked him for his ties to former president Donald Trump and to the anti-abortion movement.

In October, the Associated Press stated that Zeldin's focus on crime was persuasive and was making the race closer; however, Hochul was still favored to prevail. Hochul's campaign ramped up in the final weeks in an effort to prevent an upset loss. She pivoted her messaging to focus more on crime. She also reached out to the Working Families Party and campaigned with Democrats such as Hillary Clinton.

On Election Day, Hochul won a full term in office, defeating Zeldin by a margin of 53.1%–46.7% and becoming the first woman elected to the state's governorship. The election was New York's closest gubernatorial election since 1994, and the closest Democratic win since 1982. Hochul was criticized for prevailing "by single digits and only after some of the biggest names in the Democratic Party traveled to New York in the election's final days to help her". Former U.S. House Speaker Nancy Pelosi blamed Hochul's lack of coattails for Democrats' poor showing in U.S. House races in New York in 2022 and, by extension, for contributing to the Democrats' loss of control of the U.S. House of Representatives. Specifically, Pelosi said that Hochul "'didn't realize soon enough where the trouble was'". Hochul disagreed with this criticism, stating that "'no governor in the history of the state of New York has worked harder to elect members of Congress'" than she had.

Despite his loss, Zeldin's performance helped Republicans to flip four congressional seats in New York, contributing to the GOP's majority in the House of Representatives. Due to his overperformance, Zeldin was considered to be a potential challenger to Ronna McDaniel as chair of the Republican National Committee; however, he later declined to challenge McDaniel.

This election was the first New York gubernatorial election in over 80 years not to feature any third-party candidates, although the Working Families Party endorsed Hochul and the Conservative Party endorsed Zeldin.

Hochul won the city of New York with 69.8% to 30.2%, the latter being the highest vote percentage for a Republican since 2002. Zeldin carried voters outside New York City by a 54.1–45.9% margin and carried Upstate New York by a 54.6%–45.4% margin. Zeldin received the most votes for a Republican since 1970. Exit polls from Fox News Voter Analysis showed that Zeldin won White voters (54%–46%), while Hochul won African Americans (82%–17%), Latinos (64%–35%) (including Puerto Rican Americans (66%–33%)), and other minorities (58%–41%).

== Notes ==
Partisan clients
