= Qualified New York political parties =

In New York State, to obtain automatic ballot access, a party must qualify every two years by receiving the greater of 130,000 votes or 2% of the vote in the previous gubernatorial election or presidential election. As of 2025, the following New York political parties are qualified political parties with automatic ballot access: Democratic, Republican, Working Families, and Conservative.

Parties that do not qualify for automatic ballot access can petition their way onto the ballot. For statewide candidates, this requires 45,000 signatures, and requires 500 signatures in at least half of the congressional districts in the state.

== 1994 ==
Parties that qualified from the 1994 New York gubernatorial election
Party	Candidate	Votes	%	±%
Democratic	Mario Cuomo	2,272,903	43.80	−7.62
Republican	George Pataki	2,156,057	41.55	+20.20
Conservative	George Pataki	328,605	6.33	−14.07
Independence	B. Thomas Golisano	217,490	4.19	N/A
Liberal	Mario Cuomo	92,001	1.77	+0.02
Right to Life	Robert T. Walsh	67,750	1.33	−2.07
New York Tax Cut Now Party	George Pataki	54,040	1.04	N/A

== 1998 ==
Parties that qualified from the 1998 New York gubernatorial election
Party	Candidate	Votes	%	±%
Republican	George Pataki	2,223,264	47.37	+5.82
Democratic	Peter Vallone	1,518,992	32.36	−11.44
Independence	B. Thomas Golisano	364,056	7.76	+3.57
Conservative	George Pataki	348,727	7.43	+1.10
Liberal	Betsy McCaughey Ross	77,915	1.66	−0.11
Right to Life	Michael Reynolds	56,683	1.21	−0.10
Green	Al Lewis	52,533	1.12	+1.12
Working Families	Peter Vallone	51,325	1.09	+1.09

== 2002 ==
Parties that qualified from the 2002 New York gubernatorial election
Party	Candidate	Votes	%	±%
Republican	George Pataki	2,085,407	46.86	−0.51
Democratic	Carl McCall	1,443,531	32.44	+0.07
Independence	B. Thomas Golisano	654,016	14.70	+6.94
Conservative	George Pataki	176,848	3.97	−3.46
Working Families	Carl McCall	90,533	2.03	+0.94

== 2006 ==
Parties that qualified from the 2006 New York gubernatorial election
Party	Candidate	Votes	%	±%
Democratic	Eliot Spitzer	2,740,864	62.85	+30.41
Republican	John Faso	1,105,681	25.35	−21.51
Independence	Eliot Spitzer	190,661	4.37	−10.32
Conservative	John Faso	168,654	3.87	−0.11
Working Families	Eliot Spitzer	155,184	3.56	+1.52

== 2010 ==
Parties that qualified from the 2010 New York gubernatorial election
Party	Candidate	Votes	%	±%
Democratic	Andrew Cuomo	2,610,123	56.08	−6.77
Republican	Carl Paladino	1,290,017	27.72	+2.37
Conservative	Carl Paladino	232,264	4.99	+1.12
Working Families	Andrew Cuomo	154,487	3.32	−0.24
Independence	Andrew Cuomo	146,646	3.15	−1.22
Green	Howie Hawkins	59,928	1.29	+0.40

== 2014 ==
Parties that qualified from the 2014 New York gubernatorial election
Party	Candidate	Votes	%	±%
Democratic	Andrew Cuomo	1,811,672	47.08	−9.00
Republican	Rob Astorino	1,234,951	32.59	+4.87
Conservative	Rob Astorino	250,634	6.6	1.75
Green	Howie Hawkins	184,419	4.86	+3.57
Working Families	Andrew Cuomo	126,244	3.22	−0.10
Independence	Andrew Cuomo	77,762	2.02	−1.13
Women's Equality	Andrew Cuomo	53,802	1.41	N/A
Stop Common Core	Rob Astorino	51,294	1.39	N/A

Two additional parties qualified in the 2014 elections: the Women's Equality Party (a front for incumbent governor Andrew Cuomo) and the Stop Common Core Party (a line created by Republican candidate Rob Astorino). The Stop Common Core Party rechristened itself the Reform Party, initially unrelated to the national Reform Party, on February 17, 2015. In an effort to quash a trademark infringement dispute from the national Reform Party, the state party allowed national Reform Party officers, including chairman Bill Merrill, to take over the party. In September 2016, Curtis Sliwa orchestrated a hostile takeover of the Reform Party, and it is no longer related to the national party.

== 2018 ==
Parties that qualified from the 2018 New York gubernatorial election
Party	Candidate	Votes	%
Democratic	Andrew Cuomo	3,158,459	54.53
Republican	Marcus Molinaro	1,824,581	31.50
Conservative	Marcus Molinaro	238,578	4.12
Working Families	Andrew Cuomo	106,008	1.83
Green	Howie Hawkins	95,716	1.65
Libertarian	Larry Sharpe	90,816	1.57
Independence	Andrew Cuomo	63,518	1.10
SAM	Stephanie Miner	51,367	.89

For the first time in the 48-year history of the Libertarian Party of New York, the party qualified for automatic ballot access with Larry Sharpe's 90,816 votes. In addition, former Syracuse mayor Stephanie Miner achieved automatic ballot access for the newly created Serve America Movement line. The Women's Equality Party and the Reform Party failed to re-qualify. Shortly after the Libertarian Party and Serve America Movement qualified for ballot access, the New York State Board of Elections raised the threshold for automatic ballot access from 50,000 votes to 2% or about 130,000 votes. As a result, both parties had their automatic ballot access rescinded.

== 2020 ==
Parties that qualified from the 2020 New York presidential election
Party	Candidate	Votes	%
Democratic	Joe Biden Kamala Harris	4,844,975	56.37
Republican	Donald Trump Mike Pence	2,949,141	34.31
Working Families	Joe Biden Kamala Harris	386,010	4.49
Conservative	Donald Trump Mike Pence	295,657	3.44

The 2020 presidential race was the first presidential race to count for automatic ballot access in addition to the gubernatorial race. It was also the first election under the new qualification threshold where candidates were required to receive the greater of 130,000 votes or 2% of the vote to maintain automatic ballot access. The Libertarian Party of New York, the Green Party of New York, and the Independence Party of New York did not receive enough votes to re-qualify. The Serve America Movement was unable to re-qualify since it did not run a candidate.

== 2022 ==
Parties that qualified from the 2022 New York gubernatorial election
Party	Candidate	Votes	%
Democratic	Kathy Hochul Antonio Delgado	2,879,092	48.29%
Republican	Lee Zeldin Alison Esposito	2,449,394	41.08%
Conservative	Lee Zeldin Alison Esposito	313,187	5.25%
Working Families	Kathy Hochul Antonio Delgado	261,323	4.38%

The 2022 gubernatorial election was the first New York gubernatorial election in over 80 years not featuring any third-party candidates after the New York State Board of Elections rejected the petitions of all the minor parties that put forward candidates.

== 2024 ==
Parties that qualified from the 2024 New York presidential election
Party	Candidate	Votes	%
Democratic	Kamala Harris Tim Walz	4,341,702	51.80
Republican	Donald Trump JD Vance	3,257,736	38.87
Conservative	Donald Trump JD Vance	321,783	3.84
Working Families	Kamala Harris Tim Walz	277,841	3.31
