= Larry Sharpe =

Larry Sharpe may refer to:

- Larry Sharpe (political activist) (born 1968), American business consultant and political activist
- Larry Sharpe (wrestler) (1951–2017), American professional wrestler
