= New York Board of Elections =

New York Board of Elections may refer to:

- New York State Board of Elections
- New York City Board of Elections
