= Larry Sharpe (political activist) =

American libertarian political activist (born 1968)

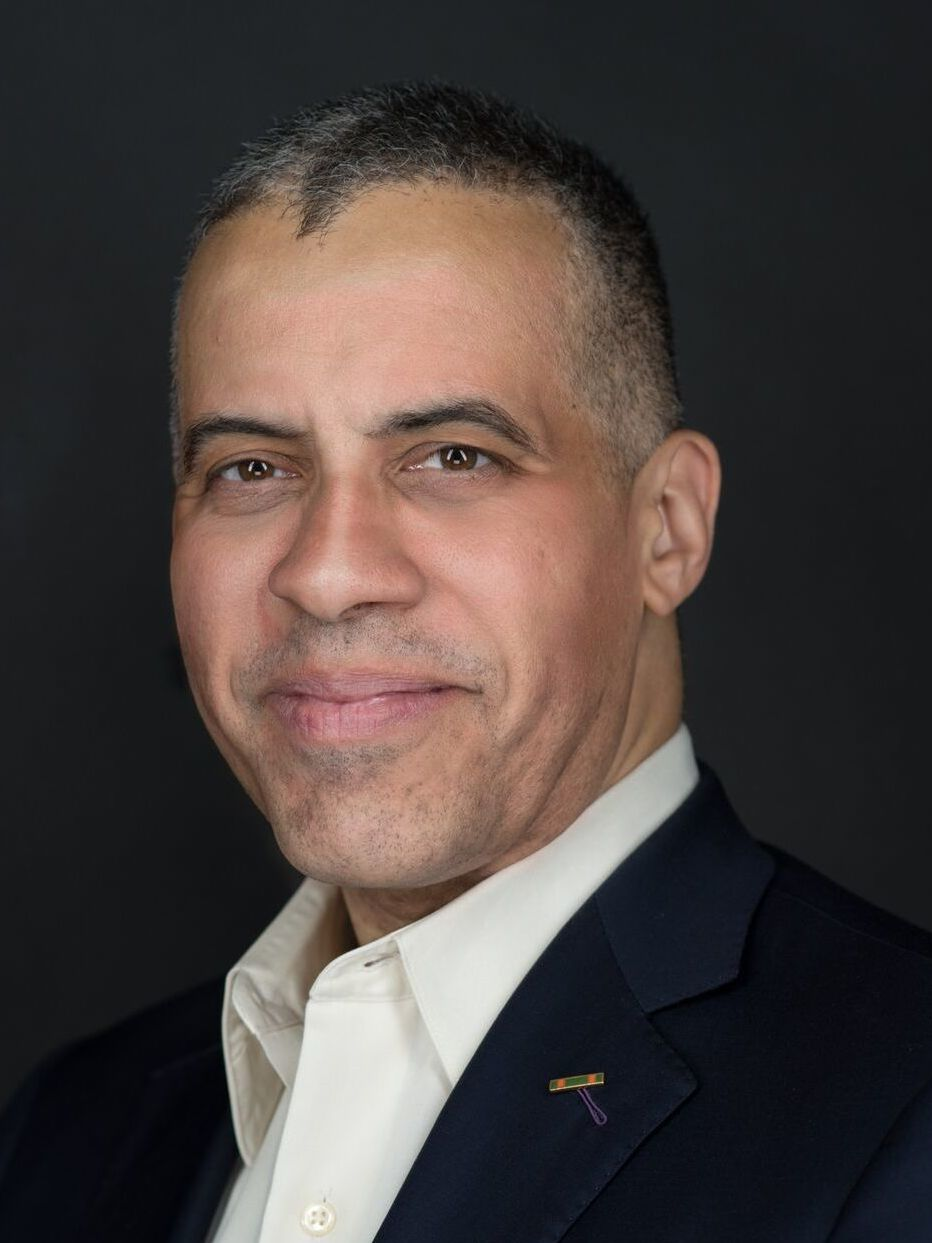
- Sharpe in 2018
- Born: July 12, 1968 (age 58); New York City, New York, U.S.
- Education: University of Maryland University College (BA)
- Occupation: Businessman
- Known for: 2018 Libertarian Party New York gubernatorial candidate; 2016 Libertarian Party vice presidential candidate
- Political party: Republican (2026-present)
- Other political affiliations: Libertarian
- Children: 2
- Military career
- Branch: United States Marine Corps
- Service years: 1986–1993
- Rank: Staff sergeant
- Website: Official website

Larry David Sharpe (born July 12, 1968) is an American businessman, entrepreneur, and political activist. He was a candidate for the Libertarian Party nomination for vice president of the United States in 2016, losing to former Massachusetts governor Bill Weld. Sharpe was the Libertarian Party nominee in the 2018 and 2022 New York gubernatorial elections, losing both races. Sharpe is the gubernatorial nominee of the Libertarian Party and the We The People Party in the 2026 New York gubernatorial election; he also unsuccessfully sought the nomination of the Republican Party.

== Early life and career ==
Sharpe was born on July 12, 1968, in Manhattan, New York, and was adopted as an infant. He joined the United States Marines Corps at age 17, serving from 1986 to 1993. He received a bachelor's degree in anthropology from the University of Maryland University College. After working as an English teacher, Sharpe founded Prime Distribution Inc., a trucking and distribution company which he later sold, in 2001. In 2004, Sharpe built an online business training company called Neo-Sage Group, Inc., for which he serves as managing director.

== Political career ==
As a Libertarian Party activist, Sharpe has outlined a vision to grow the party by encouraging grassroots Libertarian Party campaigns across the country. Sharpe served on the Libertarian National Committee as the Alternate for Region 8, until his resignation in February 2018 because of an internal LNC vote that failed to oust the party's then-vice chair, Arvin Vohra, following public controversial comments made by Vohra.

=== 2016 vice presidential campaign ===
Sharpe was a candidate for the 2016 Libertarian vice presidential nomination. During the 2016 Libertarian National Convention, he placed second on the first ballot with 30.4% of the vote. Because no one received a majority on that ballot, a second ballot vote was held. Sharpe received 46.9% of the vote on the second ballot, finishing second to former Massachusetts governor Bill Weld.

=== 2018 New York gubernatorial campaign ===
On July 12, 2017, Sharpe announced his 2018 candidacy for Governor of New York, making him the first person to formally mount a challenge to incumbent governor Andrew Cuomo in that election race. Sharpe received the Libertarian nomination on April 21, 2018, and Andrew Hollister was selected as the Lieutenant Governor nominee for the ticket.

Sharpe's campaign raised $102,596 prior to the first filing deadline, which was second to Andrew Cuomo's re-election campaign. As of October 10, 2018, Sharpe had raised $449,515 for his campaign, the highest amount ever raised by a Libertarian gubernatorial candidate in New York. Sharpe in addition was the only candidate in the race to have visited all 62 counties on the campaign trail.

On Election Day, Sharpe received 95,033 votes (1.6%) and came in fourth place behind Cuomo, Republican challenger Marc Molinaro, and Green Party candidate Howie Hawkins. Sharpe's vote total achieved automatic ballot access for the Libertarian Party of New York for the first time in the party's history.

=== 2020 vice presidential campaign ===
On April 13, 2020, it was announced that Sharpe would again seek the Libertarian Party's nomination for vice president, as the running mate of 2012 Libertarian vice presidential nominee Judge Jim Gray. After Gray was eliminated during convention presidential balloting, Sharpe withdrew from the race.

=== 2022 New York gubernatorial campaign ===
On February 16, 2022, Sharpe announced his 2022 campaign for governor of New York. During the announcement, he stated that he was seeking to run on the party lines of the Libertarian Party, the Forward Party, and the Unite Party. The Forward Party endorsed Sharpe following his announcement.

Sharpe received the Libertarian gubernatorial nomination on February 19, 2022. Andrew Hollister, Sharpe's running mate in 2018, was again selected as the lieutenant governor nominee. Prior to the 2022 election, the Libertarian Party lost its automatic ballot status following the passage of a law containing stricter ballot access requirements.

In July 2022, the New York State Board of Elections disqualified Sharpe from the general election ballot. Sharpe continued his gubernatorial campaign as a write-in candidate.

Incumbent Democratic Governor Kathy Hochul won the 2022 gubernatorial election. Sharpe received less than 10,000 votes.

=== 2024 vice presidential campaign ===
In 2024, Sharpe was the running mate of Lars Mapstead, who sought the Libertarian Party presidential nomination. At the 2024 Libertarian National Convention, Mapstead finished in fourth place and Chase Oliver became the Libertarian Party nominee. Sharpe then withdrew his vice-presidential candidacy.

=== 2026 New York gubernatorial campaign ===
On October 9, 2025, Sharpe announced his candidacy for the Libertarian Party nomination in the 2026 New York gubernatorial election. He received the Libertarian nomination at the party's state convention on October 25, 2025.

Sharpe is also running as the candidate of the We The People Party.

In February 2026, Sharpe announced that he would attempt to petition his way onto the Republican primary ballot in the gubernatorial election, which was unsuccessful.

In May 2026, the New York State Board of Elections disqualified Sharpe from the general election ballot. Sharpe continued his gubernatorial campaign as a write-in candidate.

== Political positions ==
Sharpe supports reducing regulations such as occupational licensing as well as legalizing marijuana and decriminalizing other drugs. Sharpe has advocated for raising revenue for New York by selling naming rights to bridges and highways.

=== Abortion ===
Sharpe considers himself "pro-choice" as well as "anti-abortion". While running for governor, he vowed to reduce the number of abortions in New York state by increasing availability of other options instead of establishing regulations on abortion.

=== Criminal justice and drugs ===
Sharpe has favored marijuana legalization, calling for hemp and marijuana to be "regulated like onions". Sharpe has said he would pardon those convicted of victimless crimes or otherwise non-violent offenses.

=== Economy ===
Sharpe has supported deregulation to stimulate economic growth, ending the funding of enforcement of unnecessary regulations. In particular, Sharpe has cited occupational licensing as a hurdle to small business, describing mandatory licensing for jobs such as barbers and dog walkers as "barriers to entry and a tax on the poor." Additionally, to reduce the state deficit, Sharpe has called for eliminating unfunded mandates. He has vowed to follow this reduction in state spending with a reduction in property taxes and the ultimate repeal of the New York state income tax.

=== Education ===
Sharpe has called for the decentralization of education in New York State and has proposed a "K-10" model, reducing the span of high school to ready students for the workforce and/or college. Sharpe has also rejected standardized testing until high school. He stated, "everyone should be able to opt out of testing at any time....it puts kids who have special needs at a huge disadvantage. Kids who do not test well are labeled as dumb."

Additionally, Sharpe stated he would refuse federal grants for education. He would also abolish the Board of Regents.

=== Gun laws ===
In his 2018 gubernatorial bid Sharpe vowed, if elected, to repeal the NY SAFE Act by 2020 and pardon those convicted under its provisions. Sharpe supports allowing school teachers and staff to carry firearms on school grounds, on a voluntary basis.

== Personal life ==
As of 2018, Sharpe lived with his wife Georgia and their two children in Queens, New York.

== Books ==
- Barsouk, Adam; Van Staden, Martin (2019). Igniting Liberty: Voices for Freedom Around the World. Sharpe, Larry (foreword). Amazon Digital Services LLC - KDP Print US. ISBN 978-1793165039.
- Consorte, D., Sharpe, L., Goulston, M., Hall, T., & Hogan, K. (2023). Back After Burnout: Master your BURNOUT RECOVERY with the MASHPLAY framework. In H. Burdsal & S. Burdsal (Eds.), Amazon. Luminary Tiger, LLC.
- ter Maat, M., Borders, M., Consorte, D., Mavrakakis, I., Sharpe, L., Sammeroff, A., Paige, R., Jiminez, A. A Gold New Deal: The Government We Will Tolerate. Amazon, Independently published, 30 Dec. 2023, Amazon.

== Electoral history ==
2018 New York gubernatorial election
Party	Candidate	Votes	%	±%
Democratic	Andrew Cuomo	3,424,416	56.2%	+8.6%
Working Families	Andrew Cuomo	114,478	1.9%	−1.4%
Independence	Andrew Cuomo	68,713	1.1%	−0.9%
Women's Equality	Andrew Cuomo	27,733	0.5%	−1.0%
Total	Andrew Cuomo (incumbent)	3,635,340	59.6%	+5.4%
Republican	Marc Molinaro	1,926,485	31.6%	−0.8%
Conservative	Marc Molinaro	253,624	4.2%	−2.4%
Reform	Marc Molinaro	27,493	0.5%	N/A
Total	Marc Molinaro	2,207,602	36.2%	−4.1%
Green	Howie Hawkins	103,946	1.7%	−3.1%
Libertarian	Larry Sharpe	95,033	1.6%	+1.1%
SAM	Stephanie Miner	55,441	0.9%	N/A
Total votes		'6,097,362'	'100%'	N/A
Democratic hold				

2022 New York gubernatorial election
Party	Candidate	Votes	%	±%
Democratic	Kathy Hochul; Antonio Delgado	2,879,092	48.70%	−7.39%
Working Families	Kathy Hochul; Antonio Delgado	261,323	4.42%	+2.54%
Total	Kathy Hochul (incumbent); Antonio Delgado (incumbent)	3,140,415	53.12%	−6.43%
Republican	Lee Zeldin; Alison Esposito	2,449,394	41.43%	+9.87%
Conservative	Lee Zeldin; Alison Esposito	313,187	5.30%	+1.14%
Total	Lee Zeldin; Alison Esposito	2,762,581	46.73%	+10.57%
Write-in		9,290	0.16%	+0.04%
Total votes		5,912,286	100.00%	N/A
Democratic hold				

Party political offices
Preceded by Michael McDermott	Libertarian nominee for Governor of New York; 2018, 2022	Most recent
