= Ana María Archila =

American political activist (born 1979)

Ana Maria Archila
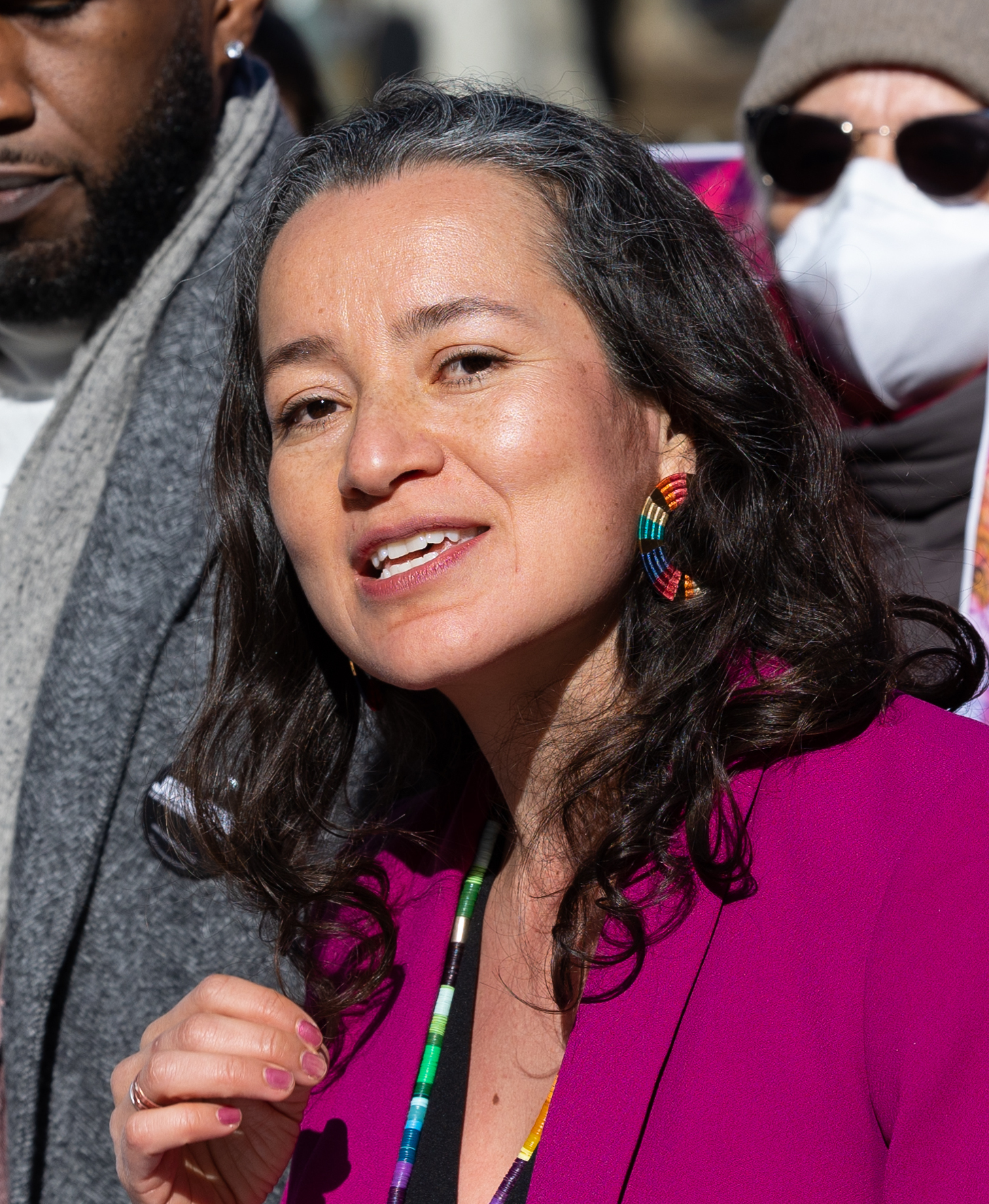

Personal details
- Born: January 27, 1979 (age 47) Colombia
- Party: Democratic; Working Families
- Education: Montclair State University (BA)

Ana María Archila (born in 1979) is an American activist serving as commissioner of the Mayor's Office of International Affairs for New York City. She was the co-director of the New York Working Families Party from 2023 to 2026.

== Early life ==
Archila was born and raised in Bogotá, Colombia. At the age of 17, Archila moved to the United States.

== Career ==
Archila attended Montclair State University before becoming a staff member of the Latin American Integration Center (LAIC) in Staten Island and Queens. The founding director of LAIC, Sara Maria Archila, was a former human rights lawyer from Colombia and was also Archila's aunt.

=== Latin American Integration Center ===
After Sara María Archila died from cancer, Ana María Archila became the executive director of LAIC. She began serving in this role in 2003. Archila advocated on behalf of parents with limited English language skills in Staten Island and Queens, New York, to obtain more information about their children's education. After LAIC merged with Make the Road by Walking to become Make the Road New York (MRNY), she become a co-executive director of the new organization. Under the leadership of Archila and her co-directors, MRNY became the largest grassroots immigrant organization in New York City.

=== Center for Popular Democracy ===
Archila subsequently became a co-executive director of the Center for Popular Democracy (CPD). In her role, Archila spoke out against the immigration policies of US President Donald Trump, as well as his attacks on the Affordable Care Act. She told CNN that removing children from their parents and their family would cause damage that would be difficult to repair later in life. In June 2018, Archila lamented that the zero tolerance policy of the Trump administration which separated immigrant children from their parents was still in operation.

Archila brought attention to Puerto Rico and problems of lack of power after Hurricane Maria. She warned that the territory was lacking in proper governmental organization in advance of the following hurricane season. She advocated for debt relief to alleviate economic problems in Puerto Rico. Archila pointed in particular to Bank of Santander as an example of economic debt pressures on Puerto Rico in the wake of Hurricane Maria. Archila said Puerto Rico was not getting responsive assistance from the US federal government because the United States Congress did not view the locality as within their representation duties.

=== U.S. Senate hearings on Supreme Court nomination ===
On September 28, 2018, US Senator Jeff Flake announced his intention to vote for Supreme Court nominee Brett Kavanaugh. Kavanaugh had been accused of sexual assault by a number of women, including Christine Blasey Ford, who testified for several hours before the Senate Judiciary Committee the day before Flake's announcement. Kavanaugh subsequently testified and denied the allegations. Flake said that Ford's testimony was "compelling," but added that Kavanaugh's response was "persuasive" and left him "with as much doubt as certainty" regarding what had occurred.

Following his announcement, but prior to the Judiciary Committee's vote on the Kavanaugh nomination, Flake was confronted by Archila and Maria Gallagher in a Senate office building elevator. The two women identified themselves as sexual assault survivors, noted the sexual assault allegations against Kavanaugh, and loudly criticized Flake about his support for the Kavanaugh nomination. CNN reported that Flake was "visibly uncomfortable" during the encounter and "seemed to have a change of heart" afterward. The exchange was broadcast live on CNN. On the same day, Flake voted not to subpoena Mark Judge—who Ford said was present during her assault—to appear before the Judiciary Committee. That afternoon, Flake voted to advance Kavanaugh's nomination out of the Senate Judiciary Committee; however, Flake added that he was a "yes" vote "only if the final Senate vote [was] delayed for one week, during which time the FBI [could] investigate sexual harassment allegations against Kavanaugh". Senate Republican leaders agreed to support the proposed investigation. Later that day, President Donald Trump directed the FBI to undertake a one-week investigation of the allegations against Kavanaugh. Kavanaugh's nomination was eventually confirmed.

=== 2022 New York lieutenant governor campaign ===
Archila was selected by Jumaane Williams as his running mate in the 2022 New York gubernatorial election. She was endorsed by Rep. Alexandria Ocasio-Cortez. In the Democratic primary, Archila finished second in a three-person race which was won by the incumbent, Antonio Delgado.

=== New York Working Families Party co-director ===
In 2023, Archila and education activist Jasmine Gripper were named co-directors of the New York chapter of the Working Families Party. She left the position in early 2026.

=== Mamdani administration ===
Archila (center) in September 2026.

On February 17, 2026, Archila was appointed as the commissioner of the Mayor's Office of International Affairs for New York City.

On July 7, 2026, Archila had attempted to meet with Amir-Saeid Iravani, the Permanent Representative of Iran to the United Nations, without informing Mayor Mamdani, according to reporting by the Manhattan Institute's City Journal and confirmed by the New York Times and others. The meeting was cancelled after the U.S. State Department intervened to block the meeting.

== Personal life ==
Archila is openly lesbian. She is married and has two children.
