= Marcia Kramer =

American journalist

- Born: December 30, 1948 (age 76); United States
- Occupation(s): Political correspondent, television news reporter
- Website: www.cbsnews.com/newyork/personality/marcia-kramer/

Marcia Kramer (born December 30, 1948) is the chief political correspondent for WCBS-TV (CBS 2) in New York City. Kramer has collected many awards for her electronic journalism at the station, and at the New York Daily News newspaper, including a George Foster Peabody awards, two Edward R. Murrow Awards, eight Emmy awards, two New York Press Club Golden Typewriter awards, and a first-place award from the Associated Press for her investigative reporting. At the Daily News, she was a staff reporter before she was appointed as the paper's first woman bureau chief in City Hall and Albany.

Kramer joined WCBS-TV in 1990 during a labor disruption at the tabloid. Her broadcast career included many years serving as the host of the station's Sunday morning political show titled "Sunday Edition with Marcia Kramer." The show featured interviews with local and national politicians, as well as round-table discussions with fellow reporters and editors. In 2022 she launched a new Sunday morning talk show on WCBS, “The Point With Marcia Kramer.” In 1996, she married Marc Kalech, who was Managing Editor of the New York Post.

During the 1992 New York presidential primary, Kramer asked then-candidate Bill Clinton the question about his past marijuana use, which prompted his response that he had smoked the drug while in college, “but did not inhale.”

In October 2000, during a New York State Senate debate, Kramer asked candidates Hillary Clinton and Rick Lazio what they thought of "Federal Bill 602-P." Kramer described the bill as a proposal to implement a tax on internet email messages. As part of a promotion by the station, the question had been sent in by a listener but the screeners reviewing the questions, Kramer and the candidates were all unaware that the "tax" was actually an internet hoax. The station quickly issued a statement correcting the error.

== See also ==
- New Yorkers in journalism
