= Alison Esposito =

American former police officer

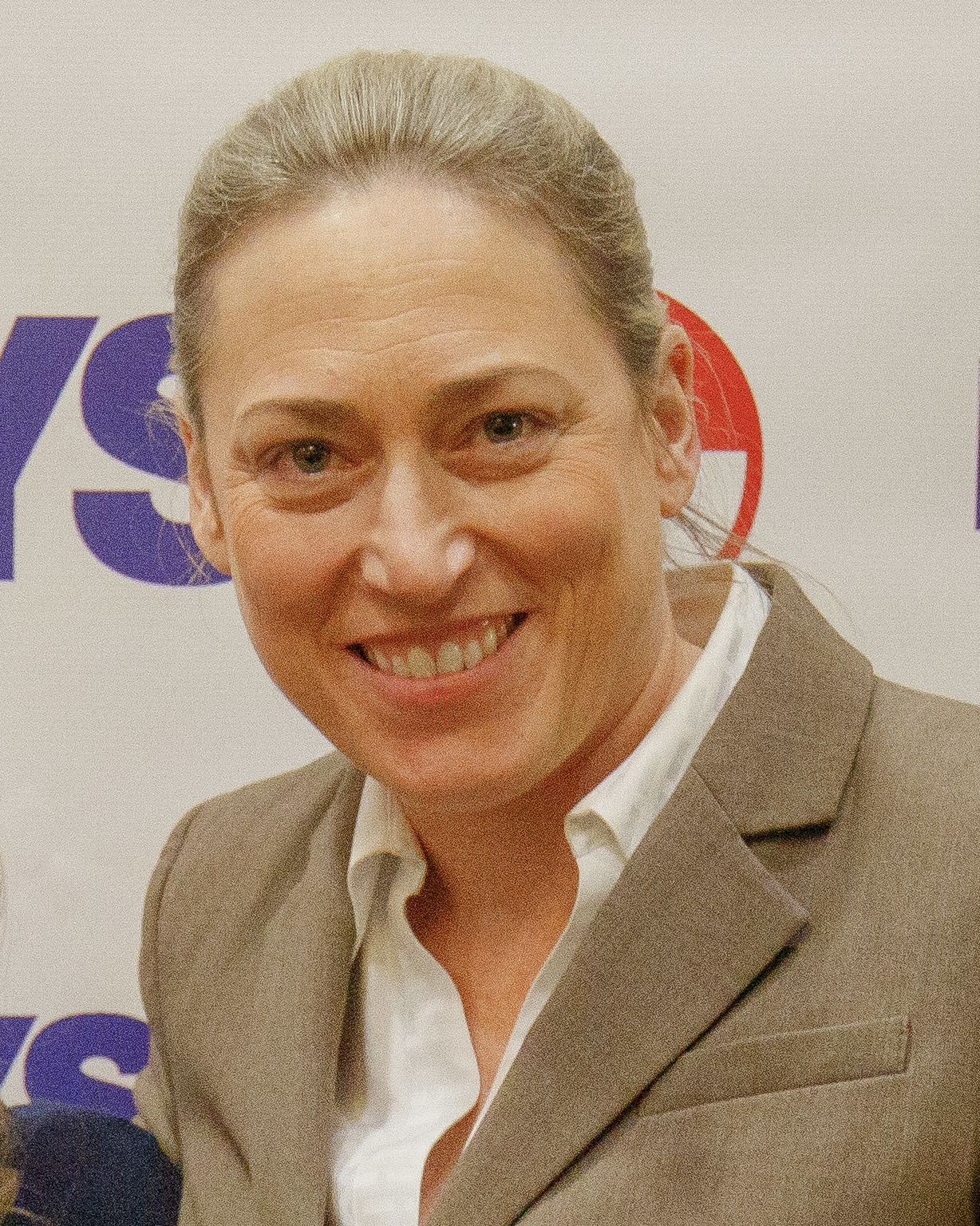
- Esposito in 2022
- Born: Alison Esposito; Highland Mills, New York, U.S.
- Education: State University of New York at Delhi; John Jay College of Criminal Justice; FBI Academy
- Political party: Republican
- Police career
- Department: New York City Police Department
- Service years: 1997–2022
- Rank: Deputy Inspector

Alison Esposito is an American political candidate and former police officer who served in the New York City Police Department from 1997 to 2022. Esposito was the Republican nominee for Lieutenant Governor of New York in 2022. She was also the Republican nominee for New York's 18th congressional district in 2024, but lost to incumbent Pat Ryan.

== Early life and education ==
Esposito was born and raised in Highland Mills, New York. Her father was a senior member of the New York City Police Department. She attended the State University of New York at Delhi, before attending John Jay College of Criminal Justice. After that, she went to the FBI Academy at Quantico.

== Career ==
Esposito joined the New York City Police Department in 1997 and eventually gained the position of deputy inspector and commanding officer in the 70th precinct of Brooklyn. She also served on a SWAT team, but retired from public service in 2022, citing dissatisfaction with the state government. In 2022, Republican U.S. Representative Lee Zeldin announced Esposito as his running mate for governor. They narrowly lost to incumbent Governor Kathy Hochul and Lieutenant Governor Antonio Delgado. It was the closest gubernatorial election since 1994. Esposito ran unopposed in the Republican primary for New York's 18th congressional district. She lost to incumbent Pat Ryan in the general election.

== Personal life ==
Esposito has openly declared herself a gay woman. She is the first openly gay major party nominee for statewide office in New York. Had she been elected to the U.S. House, she would have been the first lesbian to serve as a Republican representative.

== Electoral history ==
2022 New York gubernatorial election
Party	Candidate	Votes	%	±%
Democratic	Kathy Hochul; Antonio Delgado	2,879,092	48.77%	−7.39%
Working Families	Kathy Hochul; Antonio Delgado	261,323	4.43%	+2.55%
Total	Kathy Hochul (incumbent); Antonio Delgado (incumbent)	3,140,415	53.20%	−6.42%
Republican	Lee Zeldin; Alison Esposito	2,449,394	41.49%	+9.89%
Conservative	Lee Zeldin; Alison Esposito	313,187	5.31%	+1.15%
Total	Lee Zeldin; Alison Esposito	2,762,581	46.80%	+10.59%
Total votes		5,788,802	100.0%	
Turnout		5,902,996	47.74%	
Registered electors		12,124,242		
Democratic hold				

2024 New York's 18th congressional district election
Party	Candidate	Votes	%
Democratic	Pat Ryan	189,345	52.3
Working Families	Pat Ryan	17,761	4.9
Total	Pat Ryan (incumbent)	207,106	57.2
Republican	Alison Esposito	138,409	38.2
Conservative	Alison Esposito	16,720	4.6
Total	Alison Esposito	155,129	42.8
Total votes		362,235	100.0
Democratic hold			
