= Center for Popular Democracy =

US progressive political organization

- Abbreviation: CPD
- Formation: 2012
- Founded at: New York City, United States
- Type: Nonprofit
- Purpose: Progressive political advocacy
- Headquarters: Brooklyn, New York
- Co-executive directors: Damareo Cooper; Analilia Mejia
- Revenue: $28.7 million (2023)
- Expenses: $29.8 million (2023)
- Endowment: $35.9 million
- Website: populardemocracy.org

The Center for Popular Democracy (CPD) is an American advocacy group that promotes progressive politics. CPD is a federation of groups that includes some of the old chapters of ACORN. The group's stated goal is to "unapologetically demand transformational change for Black, brown and low-income communities." The organization is allied with teachers' unions and has published studies criticizing charter schools.

== Campaigns and actions ==
The organization gained national prominence during the protests over Brett Kavanaugh's nomination to the United States Supreme Court. One of the organization's co-executive directors, Ana Maria Archila, confronted U.S. Senator Jeff Flake over his support for Kavanaugh and other activists had questions for U.S. Senator Rand Paul.

=== Private prisons ===
CPD has run a years-long campaign against private prisons, and prison companies have warned investors that activist groups are a threat to their future profitability. This notice to investors came after lenders like JP Morgan Chase bowed to pressure from CPD and other groups and agreed to stop doing business with prison companies.

=== Local Progress ===
Local Progress, founded in 2012, started as a CPD project to connect progressive politicians so they could share policy ideas and model legislation. It works to organize grassroots groups with progressive politicians. Former Local Progress board members include Brad Lander, Helen Gym, Gregorio Casar, Phillipe Cunningham, Tefere Gebre, and Lorena González. In 2022, Local Progress spun off from CPD and became its own distinct 501(c)3 and 501(c)4 organizations, Local Progress and the Local Progress Impact Lab.

== Funding ==
CPD has received funding from the Bauman Foundation, the Ford Foundation, the Democracy Alliance, and the Open Society Foundations. It also receives funding from the William and Flora Hewlett Foundation.
