= Make the Road New York =

American nonprofit organization

Make the Road New York (MRNY)
- Predecessor: Make the Road by Walking and Latin American Integration Center
- Formation: September 19, 2007; 18 years ago
- Founders: Oona Chatterjee, Ana Maria Archila, and Andrew Friedman
- Registration no.: 11-3344389
- Co-Executive Directors: Arlenis Morel, Jose Lopez and Theo Oshiro
- Website: maketheroadny.org

Make the Road New York (MRNY) is the largest progressive grassroots immigrant-led organization in New York state. The organization works on issues of workers' rights; immigrant and civil rights; environmental and housing justice; justice for transgender, gender nonconforming, intersex, and queer (TGNCIQ) people; and educational justice. It has over 25,000 members and five community centers in Brooklyn, Queens, Staten Island, Long Island, and Westchester County.

During the Donald Trump administration, Make the Road New York made national headlines for its work to end major banks' financing of private prisons and immigrant detention centers and for leading protests at JFK Airport after the administration's January 27, 2017, announcement of an executive order suspending entry to refugees and to citizens of seven predominantly Muslim countries.

At the state level, the organization has championed legislation for immigrant New Yorkers, such as the New York Dream Act, which gives undocumented students access to financial resources in higher education, and the State Driver's License Access and Privacy Act, restoring access to driver's licenses for all New Yorkers regardless of immigration status.

There are sister Make the Road organizations in Connecticut, New Jersey, Pennsylvania, and Nevada.

== History ==
Make the Road New York was created in 2007 when two New York City-based organizations, Make the Road by Walking and the Latin American Integration Center (LAIC), merged. Make the Road by Walking (MRBW) was a Bushwick, Brooklyn-based community organization founded in 1997 and motivated by the belief that "the center of leadership must be within the community". It helped community members organize to change the public conversation about welfare and improving policy. LAIC, founded in 1992 in Jackson Heights, Queens, provided support to Latin American immigrants in the form of community organizing, adult education, and citizenship assistance.

Make the Road New York opened a Long Island office in Brentwood in 2012 to serve Nassau and Suffolk Counties' growing immigrant communities. In 2018, through a merger with the Westchester Hispanic Coalition, it began working with immigrant and working-class communities in Westchester County out of its White Plains Office.

In April 2021, co-executive directors Deborah Axt and Javier Valdés stepped down, and Arlenis Morel, Jose Lopez, and Theo Oshiro became the new co-executive directors. The current executive team consists of Co-Executive Directors Jose Lopez, Arlenis Morel, and Sienna Fontaine.
