= New York State Board of Elections =

Government agency

State Board of Elections

Agency overview
- Formed: June 1, 1974
- Jurisdiction: New York (state)
- Agency executive: co-chair; co-chair; co-executive director; co-executive director
- Parent department: New York State Executive Department
- Key document: Consolidated Laws of New York
- Website: www.elections.ny.gov

The New York State Board of Elections is a bipartisan agency of the New York state government within the New York State Executive Department responsible for enforcement and administration of election-related laws. It also regulates campaign finance disclosure and limitations through its "fair campaign code".

The State Board of Elections has four commissioners, all appointed by the Governor of New York: For the first two seats, the chairs of the two major political parties each submits a list of two or more recommended candidates, from which the governor appoints one commissioner. For the remaining two seats, each major political party's state legislative leadership submits a recommended candidate, which the governor appoints as commissioner; but if the governor declines or rejects appointing that candidate to a vacancy, the legislative leadership can either appoint the recommended candidate directly, or recommend another person to the governor instead.

In addition to the State Board of Elections, there is also a 2-member or 4-member board of election in each county, except for the five counties covered by the single, 10-member New York City Board of Elections.

== See also ==
- Elections in New York (state)
- List of electronic voting machines in New York state
