= 2026 New York gubernatorial election =

- November 3, 2026
- Reporting: 95% as of Nov 12 at 1:03 PM EST
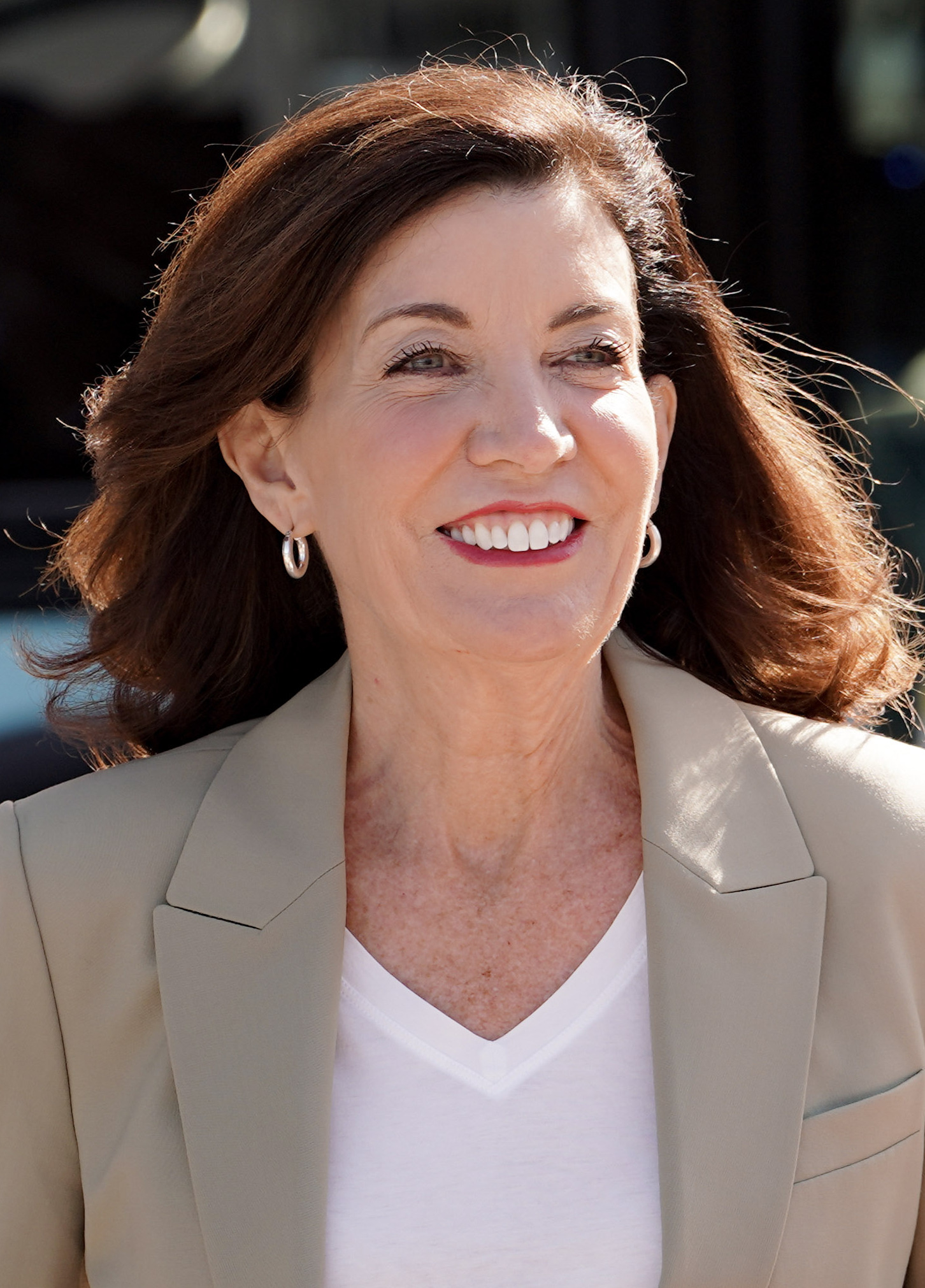

Nominee	Kathy Hochul	Bruce Blakeman
Party	Democratic	Republican
Alliance	Working Families	Parties: Conservative; Vote Affordable
Running mate	Adrienne Adams	Todd Hood
Popular vote	3,659,917	2,452,383
Percentage	59.75%	40.04%
- Hochul: 50–60% 60–70% 70–80% 80–90% Blakeman: 40–50% 50–60% 60–70% 70–80%
Governor before election
Kathy Hochul
Democratic
Elected Governor
Kathy Hochul
Democratic

The 2026 New York gubernatorial election took place on November 3, 2026, to elect the governor of New York. Incumbent Democratic governor Kathy Hochul ran for re-election to a second full term. Primary elections took place on June 23, 2026. The gubernatorial candidates selected their running mates, instead of having separate primaries.

Kathy Hochul faced Nassau County executive Bruce Blakeman, the Republican and Conservative nominee, in the general election. After U.S. representative Elise Stefanik withdrew from the Republican primary in December 2025, Blakeman was endorsed by President Donald Trump. Republicans have not won a statewide election in New York since George Pataki was re-elected governor in 2002.

On Election Day, Hochul won her second full term in office, defeating Blakeman. Her margin of victory improved from the previous election, powered by sweeping gains in Downstate New York. This included narrow victories for Hochul in both of Long Island's suburban counties of Suffolk and Nassau, the later of which was Blakeman's home county and where he has served as county executive since 2022.

== Background ==
Governor Kathy Hochul took office on August 24, 2021, upon the resignation of her predecessor, Andrew Cuomo. Hochul was elected to a full term in 2022 with 53.1% of the vote in the closest New York gubernatorial election since 1994.

== Democratic primary ==
Due to low approval ratings, poor Democratic performances in the 2022 midterm elections in New York, and controversies surrounding her administration, Hochul was considered vulnerable to a primary challenge in 2026.

On June 2, 2025, following months of reports about a strained relationship with the governor's office, Antonio Delgado launched his campaign for the Democratic nomination. On February 4, 2026, he announced nurse, union organizer, and socialist activist India Walton as his running mate.

Despite early perceptions of vulnerability to a left-wing challenge, Hochul was endorsed in February 2026 by Zohran Mamdani and Alexandria Ocasio-Cortez, both prominent members of the New York City Democratic Socialists of America. Politico noted that the endorsements "all but crowd out her little-known primary challenger, (Antonio) Delgado," while Democratic strategist Trip Yang called Hochul "the comeback player of the year." She was soon endorsed by the New York Democratic Party after securing 85% of support from party members at the state convention. Delgado ended his campaign on February 10, 2026, citing a lack of a viable path forward.

=== Candidates ===
==== Nominee ====
- Kathy Hochul, governor of New York (2021–present)
  - Running mate: Adrienne Adams, former speaker of the New York City Council (2022–2025) from the 28th district (2017–2025) and candidate for mayor of New York City in 2025

==== Withdrawn ====
- Antonio Delgado, lieutenant governor of New York (2022–present)
  - Running mate: India Walton, community organizer and nominee for mayor of Buffalo in 2021

==== Declined ====
- Letitia James, attorney general of New York (2019–present) (ran for re-election; endorsed Hochul)
- Tom Suozzi, U.S. representative from New York's 3rd congressional district (2017–2023, 2024–present) and candidate for governor in 2006 and 2022 (ran for re-election, endorsed Hochul)
- Ritchie Torres, U.S. representative from New York's 15th congressional district (2021–present) (ran for re-election; endorsed Hochul)

=== Endorsements ===
Kathy Hochul

U.S. representatives

- Yvette Clarke, NY-9 (2007–present)
- Adriano Espaillat, NY-13 (2017–present)
- Laura Gillen, NY-4 (2025–present)
- Dan Goldman, NY-10 (2023–present)
- Hakeem Jeffries, House minority leader (2023–present) from NY-08 (2013–present)
- Tim Kennedy, NY-26 (2024–present)
- George Latimer, NY-16 (2025–present)
- John Mannion, NY-22 (2025–present)
- Gregory Meeks, NY-5 (1998–present) and chair of the Queens Democratic Party (2019–present)
- Grace Meng, NY-6 (2013–present)
- Joseph Morelle, NY-25 (2018–present)
- Jerry Nadler, NY-12 (1992–present)
- Alexandria Ocasio-Cortez, NY-14 (2019–present)
- Josh Riley, NY-19 (2025–present)
- Pat Ryan, NY-18 (2022–present)
- Tom Suozzi, NY-03 (2017–2023, 2024–present)
- Paul Tonko, NY-20 (2009–present)
- Ritchie Torres, NY-15 (2021–present)
- Ed Towns, former NY-10 (1983–2013)
- Nydia Velázquez, NY-7 (1993–present)

Statewide officials

- Letitia James, attorney general of New York (2019–present)

State legislators

- Jamaal Bailey, SD-36 (2017–present) and chair of the Bronx Democratic Party (2020–present)
- Chris Burdick, AD-93 (2021–present)
- Noah Burroughs, AD-18 (2025–present)
- Siela Bynoe, SD-06 (2025–present)
- Robert Carroll, AD-44 (2017–present)
- Jeremy Cooney, SD-56 (2021–present)
- Brian Cunningham, AD-43 (2022–present)
- Andrew Gounardes, SD-26 (2019–present)
- Judy Griffin, AD-21 (2019–2022, 2025–present)
- Rebecca Kassay, AD-04 (2025–present)
- Peter Harckham, SD-40 (2019–present)
- Carl Heastie, speaker of the New York State Assembly (2015–present) from AD-83 (2001–present)
- Rodneyse Bichotte Hermelyn, AD-42 (2015–present) and chair of the Brooklyn Democratic Party (2020–present) (Note: Rodneyse Bichotte Hermelyn and the Brooklyn Democratic Party rescinded their endorsements of Hochul after she selected Adams as her running mate, before quickly re-endorsing her.)
- Pamela Hunter, speaker pro tempore of the New York State Assembly (2025–present) from AD-128 (2015–present)
- Charles D. Lavine, AD-13 (2005–present)
- Dana Levenberg, AD-95 (2023–present)
- Bill Magnarelli, AD-129 (1999–present)
- Monica Martinez, SD-04 (2023–present) and SD-03 (2019–2020)
- Rachel May, SD-48 (2019–present)
- Shelley Mayer, SD-37 (2018–present)
- Kwani O'Pharrow, AD-11 (2025–present)
- Steven Otis, AD-91 (2013–present)
- Amy Paulin, AD-88 (2001–present)
- Crystal Peoples-Stokes, majority leader of the New York State Assembly (2018–present) from AD-141 (2003–present)
- J. Gary Pretlow, AD-89 (1993–present)
- Phil Ramos, deputy speaker of the New York State Assembly (2015–2020, 2023–present) from AD-06 (2003–present)
- Chris Ryan, SD-50 (2025–present)
- Nader Sayegh, AD-90 (2019–present)
- Tommy John Schiavoni, AD-01 (2025–present)
- Frank Seddio, former AD-59 (1999–2006) and former chair of the Brooklyn Democratic Party (2012–2020)
- MaryJane Shimsky, AD-92 (2023–present)
- Michaelle C. Solages, deputy majority leader of the New York State Assembly from AD-22 (2013–present)
- Steve Stern, AD-10 (2018–present)
- Andrea Stewart-Cousins, majority leader of the New York State Senate (2019–present) from SD-35 (2007–present)
- Al Stirpe, AD-127 (2007–2010, 2013–present)
- Yudelka Tapia, AD-86 (2021–present)
- Keith Wright, former AD-70 (1993–2016) and chair of the Manhattan Democratic Party (2009–present)
- Jeremy Zellner, SD-61 (2026–present)

Local officials

- Malik Evans, mayor of Rochester (2022–present)
- Ken Jenkins, county executive for Westchester County (2025–present)
- Mark Levine, comptroller of New York City (2026–present)
- Zohran Mamdani, mayor of New York City (2026–present)
- Sharon Owens, mayor of Syracuse (2026–present)
- Mark Poloncarz, county executive for Erie County (2012–present)
- Sean Ryan, mayor of Buffalo (2026–present)
- Mike Spano, mayor of Yonkers (2012–present)

Party officials

- Jay Jacobs, chair of the New York State Democratic Party (2019–present)

Labor unions

- Civil Service Employees Association
- District Council 37
- Hotel and Gaming Trades Council
- International Union of Operating Engineers Local 825
- Laborers' International Union of North America
- LIUNA Local 79
- New York State United Teachers
- Retail, Wholesale and Department Store Union
- SEIU 32BJ

Organizations

- Democratic Governors Association
- EMILY's List
- End Citizens United
- Giffords
- Jewish Democratic Council of America
- New York State Alliance for Retired Americans
- People for the American Way
- Stonewall Democrats of New York City

Political parties

- Brooklyn Democratic Party
- Cayuga County Democratic Party
- Clinton County Democratic Committee
- Erie County Democratic Committee
- New York State Democratic Committee
Antonio Delgado (withdrawn)

State legislators

- Jabari Brisport, SD-25 (2021–present)
- Emily Gallagher, AD-50 (2021–present)

Organizations

- Citizen Action New York
- Food & Water Action
- New York Communities for Change
- Third Act NYC and Upstate New York
Declined to endorse

State legislators

- Michael Cashman, AD-115 (2025–present)
- Julia Salazar, SD-18 (2019–present)
- Claire Valdez, AD-37 (2025–present)

Individuals

- John Samuelsen, union leader

Labor unions

- Transport Workers Union of America

Political parties

- New York Working Families Party (Note: The New York Working Families Party declined to endorse Hochul or Delgado, instead nominating a "placeholder candidate" for their ballot line. The party stated that the placeholder candidate will later be replaced by whichever candidate wins the Democratic nomination.)

=== Polling ===
Aggregate polls

Source of poll aggregation	Dates administered	Dates updated	Antonio Delgado	Kathy Hochul	Undecided (Note: Calculated by taking the difference of 100% and all other candidates combined.)	Margin
RealClearPolitics	March 26 – February 3, 2026	December 16, 2025	11.0%	57.5%	31.5%	Hochul +46.5%

Poll source	Date(s) administered	Sample size (Note: Key: A – all adults RV – registered voters LV – likely voters V – unclear)	Margin of error	Antonio Delgado	Kathy Hochul	Other	Undecided
	February 10, 2026	Delgado withdraws from the race					
Siena College	January 26–28, 2026	– (RV)	–	11%	64%	2% (Note: "Someone else" with 2%)	23%
John Zogby Strategies	January 6–8, 2026	– (LV)	–	12%	64%	–	24%
Siena College	December 8–12, 2025	–	± 4.1%	13%	56%	2%	29%
Siena College	November 10–12, 2025	–	± 4.0%	16%	56%	3% (Note: "Someone else" with 3%)	25%
GrayHouse (R) (Note: Poll sponsored by a Stefanik-affiliated PAC.)	September 20–26, 2025	605 (LV)	–	14%	43%	15% (Note: "Someone else" with 15%)	28%
Siena College	August 4–7, 2025	813 (RV)	± 4.2%	15%	50%	4%	31%

Hypothetical polling

Kathy Hochul vs. Antonio Delgado vs. Ritchie Torres

Poll source	Date(s) administered	Sample size	Margin of error	Kathy Hochul	Antonio Delgado	Ritchie Torres	Other	Undecided
Siena College	June 23–26, 2025	800 (RV)	± 4.4%	49%	12%	10%	4%	26%
Siena College	May 12–15, 2025	805 (RV)	± 4.3%	46%	12%	10%	4% (Note: "Someone else" with 4%)	28%
GrayHouse (R)	April 22–24, 2025	262 (RV)	–	24%	6%	7%	8% (Note: Jamaal Bowman with 8%)	55%
Siena College	April 14–16, 2025	802 (RV)	± 4.4%	44%	12%	9%	5% (Note: "Someone else" with 5%)	30%
Data for Progress (D)	March 26–31, 2025	767 (LV)	± 4.0%	51%	11%	11%	–	27%
Siena College	March 2–6, 2025	400 (RV)	–	46%	11%	10%	4%	28%
Citizen Data (Note: Poll sponsored by Unite NY)	February 10, 2025	– (RV)	± 4.4%	52%	15%	12%	–	21%

== Republican primary ==
U.S. representative Elise Stefanik was considered a potential gubernatorial candidate throughout 2025. She formally announced her candidacy on November 7, 2025. A July 2025 Siena poll showed Stefanik leading two other potential Republican gubernatorial candidates, U.S. representative Mike Lawler and Nassau County executive Bruce Blakeman. In May 2025, President Donald Trump endorsed Lawler and Blakeman for re-election to their current posts "in a not-so-subtle attempt to clear the field for upstate Congresswoman Elise Stefanik to get the GOP nomination". On July 23, 2025, Mike Lawler announced that he would run for re-election to Congress.

Bruce Blakeman was re-elected to the post of Nassau County executive by a double-digit margin in November 2025. When asked about Blakeman's potential gubernatorial candidacy, Trump stated that Blakeman and Stefanik were "both great people". On December 9, 2025, Blakeman launched his campaign for the 2026 Republican gubernatorial nomination. According to The New York Times, Trump's decision to remain neutral and not to attempt to clear the field for Stefanik "sent shock waves through Republican circles". On December 19, Stefanik announced she was withdrawing her candidacy. President Trump endorsed Blakeman's candidacy on December 20.

In February 2026, Libertarian nominee Larry Sharpe announced his intention to petition his way onto the Republican primary ballot.

=== Candidates ===
==== Nominee ====
- Bruce Blakeman, Nassau County executive (2021–present)
  - Running mate: Todd Hood, Madison County sheriff (2018–present)

==== Did not qualify ====
- Pat Hahn, union leader
- Larry Sharpe, business training company founder and perennial candidate
  - Running mate: Mike Carpinelli, Lewis County sheriff (2006–present)
- David Tulley, cannabis shop owner

==== Withdrawn ====
- Carl Hyde Jr., town supervisor of Bethany
- Elise Stefanik, U.S. representative from New York's 21st congressional district (2015–present)

==== Declined ====
- Mike Lawler, U.S. representative from New York's 17th congressional district (2023–present) (ran for re-election, endorsed Stefanik)

=== Endorsements ===
Bruce Blakeman

Executive branch officials

- Donald Trump, president of the United States (2017–2021, 2025–present)

U.S. representatives

- Nick LaLota, NY-01 (2023–present)

Statewide officials

- Jenniffer González-Colón, governor of Puerto Rico (2025–present)
- George Pataki, former governor of New York (1995–2006) (previously endorsed Stefanik)

Party officials

- Edward F. Cox, chair of the New York Republican Party (2009–2019, 2023–present) (previously endorsed Stefanik)
- Jerry Kassar, chair of the Conservative Party of New York State (2019–present) (previously endorsed Stefanik)

Labor unions

- Transport Workers Union Locals 106 and 252

Political parties

- Clinton County Republican Committee
- Conservative Party of New York State (previously endorsed Stefanik)
- New York Republican State Committee
Elise Stefanik (withdrawn)

U.S. representatives

- Tom Emmer, House majority whip (2023–present) from MN-06 (2015–present)
- Nick Langworthy, NY-23 (2023–present)
- Mike Lawler, NY-17 (2023–present)
- Nicole Malliotakis, NY-11 (2021–present)
- Claudia Tenney, NY-24 (2023–present), NY-22 (2017–2019, 2021–2023)

Statewide officials

- ~~George Pataki, former governor of New York (1995–2006)~~ (later endorsed Blakeman)

State legislators

- Joe Angelino, AD-121 (2021–present)
- Jake Ashby, SD-43 (2023–present)
- Andrea Bailey, AD-133 (2025–present)
- William A. Barclay, minority leader of the New York State Assembly (2020–present) from the 120th district (2003–present)
- Anil Beephan Jr., AD-105 (2023–present)
- Scott Bendett, AD-107 (2023–present)
- Ken Blankenbush, AD-117 (2011–present)
- Paul Bologna, AD-144 (2025–present)
- George Borrello, SD-57 (2019–present)
- Karl A. Brabenec, AD-98 (2014–present)
- Alec Brook-Krasny, AD-46 (2006–2015, 2023–present)
- Steve Chan, SD-17 (2025–present)
- Lester Chang, AD-49 (2023–present)
- Patrick Chludzinski, AD-143 (2025–present)
- David DiPietro, AD-147 (2023–present)
- Christopher S. Friend, AD-124 (2011–present)
- Jeff Gallahan, AD-131 (2021–present)
- Scott Gray, AD-116 (2023–present)
- Joseph Griffo, SD-47 (2007–present)
- Stephen Hawley, AD-139 (2006–present)
- Pam Helming, SD-54 (2017–present)
- Josh Jensen, AD-134 (2021–present)
- Andrew Lanza, SD-24 (2007–present)
- John Lemondes Jr., AD-126 (2021–present)
- Brian Maher, AD-101 (2023–present)
- Brian Manktelow, AD-130 (2019–present)
- Brian Miller, AD-122 (2017–present)
- Andrew Molitor, AD-150 (2025–present)
- Angelo Morinello, AD-145 (2017–present)
- Michael Novakhov, AD-45 (2023–present)
- Peter Oberacker, SD-51 (2021–present)
- Rob Ortt, minority leader of the New York State Senate (2020–present) from SD-62 (2015–present)
- Phil Palmesano, AD-132 (2011–present)
- Sam Pirozzolo, AD-63 (2023–present)
- Michael Reilly, AD-62 (2019–present)
- Robert Rolison, SD-39 (2023–present)
- Joe Sempolinski, AD-148 (2025–present)
- Sue Serino, county executive of Dutchess County (2024–present) and former SD-41 (2015–2022)
- Matt Simpson, AD-114 (2021–present)
- Matt Slater, AD-94 (2023–present)
- Robert Smullen, AD-118 (2019–present)
- Dan Stec, SD-45 (2021–present)
- Michael Tannousis, AD-64 (2021–present) and chair of the Staten Island Republican Party (2022–present)
- Christopher Tague, AD-102 (2018–present)
- Jim Tedisco, SD-44 (2017–present)
- Mark Walczyk, SD-49 (2023–present)
- Mary Beth Walsh, AD-112 (2017–present)
- Bill Weber, SD-38 (2023–present)

County officials

- Kevin Byrne, county executive for Putnam County (2023–present)
- Steven McLaughlin, county executive for Rensselaer County County executive (2018–present)
- Steve Neuhaus, county executive for Orange County (2024–present)

Local officials

- Inna Vernikov, New York City councilmember from the 48th district (2021–present)

Party officials

- Andrea Catsimatidis, chair of the Manhattan Republican Party (2017–present)
- ~~Edward F. Cox, chair of the New York Republican Party (2009–2019, 2023–present)~~ (later endorsed Blakeman)
- ~~Gerard Kassar, chair of the Conservative Party of New York State (2019–present)~~ (later endorsed Blakeman)
- Curtis Sliwa, former chair of the Reform Party of New York State (2016–2018)

Individuals

- Miriam Adelson, owner of the Las Vegas Sands
- Sid Rosenberg, radio personality
- Leo Terrell, civil rights attorney

Organizations

- Maggie's List
- New York State Rifle and Pistol Association

Political parties

- ~~Conservative Party of New York State~~ (later endorsed Blakeman)

=== Polling ===
Hypothetical polling

Poll source	Date(s) administered	Sample size	Margin of error	Bruce Blakeman	Another candidate	Undecided
John Zogby Strategies	January 6–8, 2026	– (LV)	–	34%	21%	45%

Poll source	Date(s) administered	Sample size	Margin of error	Bruce Blakeman	Elise Stefanik	Other	Undecided
Siena College	December 8–12, 2025	–	± 4.1%	17%	48%	1% (Note: "Someone else" with 1%)	34%
J.L. Partners (R)	November 9–10, 2025	400 (LV)	± 4.9%	5%	74%	7% (Note: "Someone else" with 7%)	14%

Poll source	Date(s) administered	Sample size	Margin of error	Bruce Blakeman	Mike Lawler	Elise Stefanik	Other	Undecided
Siena College	June 23–26, 2025	800 (RV)	± 4.4%	7%	18%	35%	1%	39%
co/efficient (R)	June 18–20, 2025	1108 (LV)	± 3.8%	6%	8%	64%	–	22%
Siena College	May 12–15, 2025	805 (RV)	± 4.3%	11%	22%	35%	2%	30%
co/efficient (R)	May 1–2, 2025	1163 (LV)	± 3.3%	8%	9%	56%	–	27%
GrayHouse (R)	April 22–24, 2025	400 (RV)	± 5.0%	5%	7%	44%	–	44%
Siena College	April 14–16, 2025	802 (RV)	± 4.4%	28%	22%	–	4%	46%
Siena College	March 2–6, 2025	400 (RV)	–	13%	25%	–	3%	60%

== Conservative convention ==
The New York State Conservative Party held its annual conference and nominating convention in Albany in February 2026, officially endorsing Blakeman for governor. Because New York utilizes a fusion voting system, Blakeman accepted the third-party ballot line to run concurrently on both the Republican and Conservative lines.

=== Candidates ===
==== Nominee ====
- Bruce Blakeman, Nassau County executive (2021–present)
  - Running mate: Todd Hood, Madison County sheriff (2018–present)

== Working Families convention ==
The New York Working Families Party declined to nominate Hochul or Delgado, instead opting for a "placeholder candidate" to appear on their ballot line. The party has stated that the placeholder candidate will later be replaced by the Democratic nominee. A convention attendee told City & State that Delgado won 41% of the weighted party committee vote to Hochul's 3%, while "placeholder candidate" won 56% of the vote. State party leaders Jasmine Gripper and Ana María Archila disputed the claim, but did not share the exact vote totals.

On August 21, the Working Families Party nominated Hochul and Adams.

=== Candidates ===
==== Nominee ====
- Kathy Hochul, governor of New York (2021–present)
  - Running mate: Adrienne Adams, former speaker of the New York City Council (2022–2025) from the 28th district (2017–2025) and candidate for mayor of New York City in 2025

== Independents and other parties ==
The New York State Board of Elections rejected all petitions for non-qualified party ballot access in May 2026.

=== Libertarian Party ===
The Libertarian Party of New York (LPNY) had no ballot line in 2026, having lost ballot access after the 2020 state budget raised the qualification thresholds. At its nominating convention in Rochester on October 25, 2025, the party's State Committee nominated Larry Sharpe, its 2018 and 2022 candidate, for governor, giving him 12 of 20 votes over Christopher Olenski and "None of the Above" (NOTA). Nominations for lieutenant governor and the other statewide offices were postponed.

In February 2026, Sharpe announced a campaign for the Republican nomination to challenge Nassau County Executive Bruce Blakeman, urging registered Libertarians to switch their enrollment so they could vote in the closed primary. Sharpe himself later changed his enrollment to the Republican Party. His running mate in that effort was Lewis County Sheriff Michael Carpinelli. Blakeman ultimately faced no contested primary.

On March 8, 2026, the State Committee voted 9–12 against entering Carpinelli, who was not an LPNY member, into nomination for lieutenant governor, short of the required three-quarters vote, and instead nominated Mark Braiman. By April, Sharpe was also discussing a possible run with commentator Shannon Joy as lieutenant governor, without seeking the party's endorsement. On April 12, with petitioning about to begin and no LPNY petition available, the State Committee voted 13–9 (3 abstaining) to rescind Sharpe's nomination. Braiman withdrew, and the committee postponed nominations for statewide office indefinitely and endorsed NOTA for governor, lieutenant governor, attorney general and comptroller without objection.

Sharpe and Joy then sought a place on the ballot as an independent ticket under the "Coalition Party" name, with a goal of gathering 50,000 signatures in five weeks. Their petition was found invalid on prima facie review, with a maximum of 1,615 signatures as filed against the 45,000 required. A separate document filed in the name of "None of the Above" for the Libertarian Party was not recognized as a petition.

In October, the LPNY urged voters to write in "None of the Above" for governor on November 3 as a protest against ballot access laws.

==== Governor ====
- None of the Above (endorsed April 12, 2026)
- Larry Sharpe, activist, businessman and Libertarian nominee for governor in 2018 and 2022; nominated October 25, 2025 (nomination rescinded April 12, 2026)
- Christopher Olenski (nominated for endorsement and lost)

==== Lieutenant governor ====
- None of the Above (endorsed April 12, 2026)
- Mark Braiman, State Committee member from Judicial District 6; nominated March 8, 2026 (withdrew before April 12, 2026)
- Vincent O'Neill, State Committee member from Judicial District 10; nominated March 8, 2026 (eliminated in the first round of voting)

=== Other candidates ===
==== Declared ====
- Jonathan Makeley (Prohibition), chair of the Prohibition Party of New York (write-in)

==== Disqualified ====
- Larry Sharpe (running mate: Shannon Joy Bones) (Coalition), business training company founder and perennial candidate
- Kevin Gay
- Carl Gottstein (Independent), conservative activist

== General election ==
=== Predictions ===
Source	Ranking	As of
The Cook Political Report	Solid D	October 29, 2026
Decision Desk HQ	Likely D	November 3, 2026
Fox News	Solid D	November 1, 2026
Inside Elections	Likely D	October 29, 2026
NBC News	Solid D	November 3, 2026
RealClearPolitics	Solid D	November 1, 2026
Sabato's Crystal Ball	Safe D	November 2, 2026
Silver Bulletin	Solid D	November 3, 2026

=== Post-primary endorsements ===
Kathy Hochul (D)

State legislators

- 4 state senators (Note: Erik Bottcher, SD-47 (2026–present); Nathalia Fernandez, SD-34 (2023–present); Luis R. Sepúlveda, SD-32 (2018–present); José M. Serrano, SD-29 (2005–present))
- 8 state assemblymembers (Note: George Alvarez, AD-78 (2023–present); Michael Benedetto, AD-82 (2005–present); Landon Dais, AD-77 (2024–present); Jeffrey Dinowitz, AD-81 (1994–present); Chantel Jackson, AD-79 (2021–present); Karines Reyes, AD-87 (2019–present); Emerita Torres, AD-85 (2025–present); John Zaccaro, AD-80 (2023–present))

Local officials

- Michael Bloomberg, former mayor of New York City (2002–2013)
- Vanessa Gibson, borough president of the Bronx (2022–present)
- Brad Hoylman-Sigal, borough president of Manhattan (2026–present)
- Julie Menin, speaker of the New York City Council (2026–present) from CD-05 (2022–present)
- Jumaane Williams, public advocate of New York City (2019–present)
- 8 other New York City councilmembers (Note: Shirley Aldebol, CD-13 (2026–present); Eric Dinowitz, CD-11 (2021–present); Elsie Encarnacion, CD-08 (2026–present); Amanda Farías, CD-18 (2022–present); Oswald Feliz, CD-15 (2021–present); Kevin Riley, CD-12 (2021–present); Justin Sanchez, CD-17 (2026–present); Pierina Sanchez, CD-14 (2022–present))

Labor unions

- 1199SEIU United Healthcare Workers East
- Actors' Equity Association
- American Federation of Musicians Local 802
- Communications Workers of America District 1
- IATSE District 10
- New York City Building and Construction Trades Council
- New York State AFL-CIO
- New York State Professional Fire Fighters Association
- Professional Staff Congress
- Public Employees Federation
- Uniformed Fire Officers Association
- Uniformed Firefighters Association

Organizations

- Democrats for Education Reform
- Eleanor's Legacy
- Everytown for Gun Safety
- Human Rights Campaign
- New York League of Conservation Voters
- Planned Parenthood of Greater New York
Bruce Blakeman (R)

Local officials

- Robert Holden, former CD-30 (2018–2025) (Democratic)

Labor unions

- Correction Officers' Benevolent Association
- New York State Court Officers Association
- New York State Supreme Court Officers Association
- United Association Steamfitters Local 638

Individuals

- Debra Messing, actress

=== Fundraising ===
Campaign finance reports as of October 19, 2026
Candidate	Raised	Spent
Kathy Hochul (D)	$37,006,213	$43,151,288
Bruce Blakeman (R)	$27,844,269	$28,283,290
Source: Transparency USA

=== Polling ===
Aggregate polls

Source of poll aggregation	Dates administered	Dates updated	Kathy Hochul	Bruce Blakeman	Other/undecided (Note: Calculated by taking the difference of 100% and all other candidates combined.)	Margin
270toWin	September 11 – October 6, 2026	October 15, 2026	52.3%	39.0%	8.7%	Hochul +13.3%
Decision Desk HQ	through October 19, 2026	October 21, 2026	53.3%	41.0%	5.7%	Hochul +12.3%
FiftyPlusOne	through October 19, 2026	October 21, 2026	52.9%	40.7%	6.4%	Hochul +12.2%
RealClearPolitics	September 11 – October 19, 2026	October 21, 2026	52.5%	41.0%	6.5%	Hochul +11.5%
Silver Bulletin	through October 14, 2026	October 21, 2026	53.2%	40.9%	5.9%	Hochul +12.3%
Average			52.8%	40.5%	6.7%	Hochul +12.3%

Poll source	Date(s) administered	Sample size	Margin of error	Kathy Hochul (D)	Bruce Blakeman (R)	Other	Undecided
Research Co.	October 30 – November 1, 2026	450 (LV)	± 4.6%	52%	43%	—	5%
Marist University	October 22–25, 2026	— (LV)	± 3.9%	53%	42%	0% (Note: "Another party's candidate" with <1%)	4%
Marist University	October 22–25, 2026	1,448 (RV)	± 3.5%	55%	41%	0%	4%
ActiVote	October 1–23, 2026	400 (LV)	± 4.9%	59%	41%	–	–
Siena University	October 19–22, 2026	807 (LV)	± 4.1%	54%	40%	–	6%
Quinnipiac University	October 15–19, 2026	1,167 (LV)	± 3.8%	55%	41%	2% (Note: "Refused" with 2%)	2%
OnMessage Inc. (R) (Note: Poll sponsored by the campaign of Saritha Komatireddy, the Republican nominee for Attorney General)	October 1–6, 2026	1,000 (LV)	± 2.8%	50%	46%	–	4%
Beacon Research (D)	October 1–6, 2026	820 (RV)	± 3.5%	53%	31%	–	16%
Emerson College (Note: Poll sponsored by WPIX)	October 3–5, 2026	900 (LV)	± 3.3%	52%	40%	—	8%
Marist University	October 1–4, 2026	1,361 (RV)	± 3.6%	53%	42%	1% (Note: "Another candidate" with 1%)	5%
co/efficient (R) (Note: Poll sponsored by Coalition to Protect Nassau Taxpayers)	September 23–25, 2026	1,046 (LV)	± 3.0%	48%	41%	–	11%
Quinnipiac University	September 17–20, 2026	1,026 (LV)	± 4.1%	58%	39%	1% (Note: "Refused" with 1%)	2%
Siena College	September 11–17, 2026	1,144 (LV)	± 3.9%	50%	41%	–	9%
McLaughlin & Associates (R) (Note: Poll sponsored by Blakeman's campaign)	August 27–31, 2026	800 (LV)	± 4.7%	50%	46%	–	5%
Concord Public Opinion Partners (D) (Note: Poll sponsored by Education Reform Now)	August 19–21, 2026	505 (LV)	± 4.4%	50%	34%	5% (Note: "Someone else" with 5%)	11%
Siena College	August 3–6, 2026	811 (LV)	± 4.2%	49%	39%	1%	11%
Moxie Strategies (Note: Poll sponsored by the Firefighters Association of the State of New York)	July 22–28, 2026	813 (RV)	± 4.3%	49%	37%	7% (Note: "Would not vote" with 7%)	7%
Red Oak Strategic (R) (Note: Poll sponsored by Strong And Safe, a super PAC supporting Blakeman)	July 7–12, 2026	2,000 (RV)	± 2.2%	47%	43%	–	10%
co/efficient (R)	June 30 – July 2, 2026	1,085 (LV)	± 3.0%	47%	41%	–	12%
	June 23, 2026	Primary elections					
Siena University	June 17–23, 2026	1,120 (RV)	± 3.6%	52%	32%	1%	15%
Pollfinity Research	June 11–14, 2026	229 (RV)	± 6.5%	50%	40%	–	10%
Pollfinity Research	June 11–14, 2026	229 (RV)	± 6.5%	46%	35%	4% (Note: Larry Sharpe (L) with 4%)	14%
Siena College	April 27–30, 2026	806 (RV)	± 4.2%	49%	33%	3%	16%
Siena College	March 23–26, 2026	804 (RV)	± 4.5%	47%	34%	3%	16%
Echelon Insights/Tusk Strategies	March 24–26, 2026	500 (RV)	± 5.4%	55%	40%	–	5%
McLaughlin & Associates (R)	March 4–8, 2026	800 (LV)	± 3.5%	52%	43%	–	5%
Siena University	February 23–26, 2026	805 (RV)	± 4.5%	51%	31%	3%	15%
Marist University	February 16–19, 2026	1,442 (RV)	± 3.3%	50%	33%	2% (Note: "Another party's candidate" with 2%)	15%
MAD Global Strategy (Note: Poll sponsored by Natural Allies for a Clean Energy Future)	February 2–4, 2026	600 (LV)	± 4.0%	47%	34%	–	19%
Siena College	January 26–28, 2026	802 (RV)	± 4.3%	54%	28%	1%	17%
John Zogby Strategies	January 6–8, 2026	844 (LV)	± 3.4%	53%	39%	–	8%
John Zogby Strategies	January 6–8, 2026	844 (LV)	± 3.4%	49%	34%	8% (Note: Larry Sharpe (L) with 8%)	9%
Siena University	December 8–12, 2025	801 (RV)	± 4.1%	50%	25%	4%	21%
J.L. Partners (R)	November 9–10, 2025	500 (LV)	± 4.4%	47%	36%	–	17%
Siena College	June 23–26, 2025	800 (RV)	± 4.4%	44%	19%	–	37%
GrayHouse (R)	April 22–24, 2025	600 (RV)	± 4.0%	44%	36%	–	20%

Hypothetical polling

Kathy Hochul vs. Elise Stefanik

Poll source	Date(s) administered	Sample size	Margin of error	Kathy Hochul (D)	Elise Stefanik (R)	Other	Undecided
Siena College	December 8–12, 2025	801 (RV)	± 4.1%	49%	30%	1%	20%
Siena College	November 10–12, 2025	802 (RV)	± 4.0%	52%	32%	2%	14%
J.L. Partners (R)	November 9–10, 2025	500 (LV)	± 4.4%	46%	43%	–	11%
Manhattan Institute (R)	October 22–26, 2025	900 (LV/RV)	± 3.3%	42%	43%	9% (Note: "Someone else" with 9%)	6%
GrayHouse (R)	September 20–26, 2025	1,250 (LV)	± 2.6%	48%	43%	–	9%
Siena College	September 8–10, 2025	802 (RV)	± 4.2%	52%	27%	3%	17%
Siena College	August 4–7, 2025	813 (RV)	± 4.2%	45%	31%	3%	20%
Siena College	June 23–26, 2025	800 (RV)	± 4.4%	47%	24%	–	29%
Harper Polling (R) (Note: Poll conducted for an undisclosed Republican client)	May 7–9, 2025	600 (LV)	± 4.0%	50%	39%	–	11%
co/efficient (R)	May 1–2, 2025	1,163 (LV)	± 3.3%	43%	42%	–	15%
GrayHouse (R)	April 22–24, 2025	600 (RV)	± 4.0%	46%	40%	–	14%

Kathy Hochul vs. Mike Lawler

Poll source	Date(s) administered	Sample size	Margin of error	Kathy Hochul (D)	Mike Lawler (R)	Other	Undecided
Siena College	June 23–26, 2025	800 (RV)	± 4.4%	44%	24%	–	32%
Harper Polling (R)	May 7–9, 2025	600 (LV)	± 4.0%	48%	41%	–	11%
GrayHouse (R)	April 22–24, 2025	600 (RV)	± 4.0%	45%	38%	–	17%
Citizen Data	February 10, 2025	1,000 (RV)	± 3.1%	46%	38%	10%	6% (Note: "I don't plan to vote in this election" with 6%)

Kathy Hochul vs. different candidate

Poll source	Date(s) administered	Sample size	Margin of error	Kathy Hochul (D)	Different Candidate	Undecided
Siena College	January 26–28, 2026	802 (RV)	± 4.3%	42%	51%	7%
Siena College	November 10–12, 2025	802 (RV)	± 4.0%	42%	48%	10%
J.L. Partners (R)	November 9–10, 2025	500 (LV)	± 4.4%	37%	55%	7%
GrayHouse (R)	September 20–26, 2025	1,250 (LV)	± 2.6%	34%	59%	7%
Siena College	September 8–10, 2025	802 (RV)	± 4.2%	37%	51%	12%
Siena College	August 4–7, 2025	813 (RV)	± 4.2%	35%	53%	12%
Siena College	June 23–26, 2025	800 (RV)	± 4.4%	37%	55%	8%
Siena College	May 12–15, 2025	805 (RV)	± 4.3%	36%	55%	9%
GrayHouse (R)	April 22–24, 2025	600 (RV)	± 4.0%	27%	61%	12%
Siena College	April 14–16, 2025	802 (RV)	± 4.4%	39%	48%	13%
Siena College	March 2–6, 2025	806 (RV)	± 4.3%	34%	56%	10%
Siena College	January 27–30, 2025	803 (RV)	± 4.2%	31%	57%	12%
Siena College	December 2–5, 2024	1,059 (RV)	± 4.1%	33%	57%	11%
Slingshot Strategies (D)	May 2–3, 2024	1,059 (RV)	± 5.0%	34%	44%	21%

Kathy Hochul vs. generic Republican

Poll source	Date(s) administered	Sample size	Margin of error	Kathy Hochul (D)	Generic Republican	Undecided
J.L. Partners (R)	November 9–10, 2025	500 (LV)	± 4.4%	45%	42%	13%

Antonio Delgado vs. Elise Stefanik

Poll source	Date(s) administered	Sample size	Margin of error	Antonio Delgado (D)	Elise Stefanik (R)	Undecided
Manhattan Institute (R)	October 22–26, 2025	900 (LV/RV)	± 3.3%	37%	43%	20%

=== Debate ===
2026 New York gubernatorial election debate
No.	Date	Host	Moderator	Link	Democratic	Republican
Key: P Participant A Absent N Not invited I Invited W Withdrawn						
Key: P Participant A Absent N Not invited I Invited W Withdrawn					Kathy Hochul	Bruce Blakeman
1	October 13, 2026	NY1	Susan Arbetter; Errol Louis	YouTube	P	P

=== Results ===
2026 New York gubernatorial election
Party	Candidate	Votes	%	±%
Democratic	Kathy Hochul; Adrienne Adams			
Working Families	Kathy Hochul; Adrienne Adams			
Total	Kathy Hochul (incumbent); Adrienne Adams	3,659,917	59.75	
Republican	Bruce Blakeman; Todd Hood			
Conservative	Bruce Blakeman; Todd Hood			
Vote Affordable	Bruce Blakeman; Todd Hood			
Total	Bruce Blakeman; Todd Hood	2,452,383	40.04	
Write-in		12,903	0.21	
Total votes		6,125,203	100.0	
Democratic hold				

Counties that flipped from Republican to Democratic

- Broome (largest municipality: Binghamton)
- Dutchess (largest municipality: Poughkeepsie)
- Nassau (largest municipality: Hempstead)
- Orange (largest municipality: Palm Tree)
- Rensselaer (largest municipality: Troy)
- Rockland (largest municipality: Ramapo)
- Saratoga (largest municipality: Clifton Park)
- Suffolk (largest municipality: Brookhaven)

== See also ==
- 2026 United States gubernatorial elections
- 2022 New York gubernatorial election
- 2024 United States presidential election in New York

== Notes ==
Partisan clients
