= 2022 New York Attorney General election =

- November 8, 2022
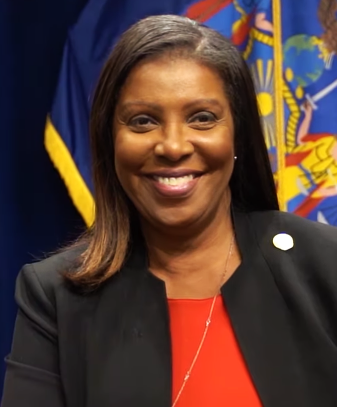

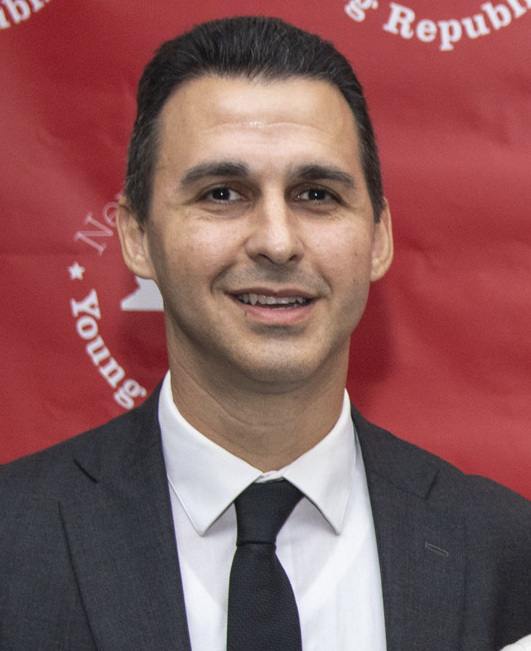
Nominee	Letitia James	Michael Henry
Party	Democratic	Republican
Alliance	Working Families	Conservative
Popular vote	3,168,256	2,631,301
Percentage	54.60%	45.35%
- James: 40–50% 50–60% 60–70% 70–80% 80–90% >90% Henry: 40–50% 50–60% 60–70% 70–80% 80–90% >90% Tie: 40–50% 50% No votes
Attorney General before election
Letitia James
Democratic
Elected Attorney General
Letitia James
Democratic

The 2022 New York Attorney General election was held on November 8, 2022. Incumbent Democratic Attorney General Letitia James was eligible for re-election, but originally decided to run for Governor of New York in 2022. On December 9, 2021, however, she suspended her gubernatorial campaign and announced that she would seek re-election as attorney general. Republicans nominated Michael Henry, an attorney from Queens. James defeated Henry by a margin of 9.2%, down from her 27.2% victory in 2018.

Of all the statewide races in New York in 2022, this is the only one where the incumbent (Letitia James) refused to debate their opponent.

== Democratic primary ==
After incumbent attorney general Letitia James announced her candidacy for governor of New York, several other Democrats launched campaigns for attorney general. When James suspended her campaign for governor and announced that she would seek re-election instead, those candidates ended their campaigns for attorney general and endorsed James. As of June 23, 2022, James had no primary challengers. The Democratic primary for AG was cancelled and James advanced to the November general election.

=== Candidates ===
==== Nominee ====
- Letitia James, incumbent attorney general (2019–present) (previously ran for governor)

==== Withdrew ====
- Dan Goldman, former assistant U.S. Attorney for the Southern District of New York (2007–2017) and former general counsel for the U.S. House Intelligence Committee (2019–2020) (running for U.S. House, endorsed James)
- Shelley Mayer, state senator from the 37th district (2018–present) (running for re-election, endorsed James)
- Zephyr Teachout, Fordham University Associate Professor, candidate for governor in 2014, nominee for NY-19 in 2016, and candidate for attorney general in 2018 (endorsed James)
- Clyde Vanel, state assemblyman for the 33rd District of New York (2017–present) (running for re-election, endorsed James)
- Maria Vullo, former Superintendent of the New York State Department of Financial Services (endorsed James)

==== Declined ====
- Michael Gianaris, state senator from the 12th district (2011–present); Deputy Majority Leader of the New York State Senate (2019–present); state assemblymember from the 36th district (2001–2010) (running for re-election, endorsed James)
- Laura Gillen, former town supervisor of Hempstead (2018–2019) (running for U.S. House)
- Sean Patrick Maloney, U.S. representative for NY-18 (2015–present); candidate for attorney general in 2018 (running for re-election, endorsed James)
- Kathleen Rice, U.S. representative for NY-4 (2015–present) (endorsed James)
- Tom Suozzi, U.S. representative for NY-3 (2017–present) (running for governor)

==== Endorsements ====
Dan Goldman (withdrew)

U.S. representatives

- Adam Schiff, U.S. Representative for CA-28 (2013–2024)
Letitia James

U.S. executive branch officials

- Dan Goldman, assistant U.S. Attorney for the Southern District of New York (2007–2017) and general counsel for the U.S. House Intelligence Committee (2019–2020)

U.S. senators

- Kirsten Gillibrand, U.S. Senator from New York (2009–present)
- Chuck Schumer, Senate Majority Leader (2021–present) and U.S. Senator from New York (1999–present)

U.S. representatives

- Jamaal Bowman, U.S. Representative for NY-16 (2021–present)
- Yvette Clarke, U.S. Representative for NY-09 (2013–present)
- Adriano Espaillat, U.S. Representative for NY-13 (2017–present)
- Brian Higgins, U.S. Representative for NY-26 (2013–present)
- Hakeem Jeffries, U.S. Representative for NY-08 (2013–present)
- Mondaire Jones, U.S. Representative for NY-17 (2021–present)
- Carolyn Maloney, U.S. Representative for NY-12 (2013–present)
- Sean Patrick Maloney, U.S. Representative for NY-18 (2013–present)
- Gregory Meeks, U.S. Representative for NY-05 (2013–present)
- Grace Meng, U.S. Representative for NY-06 (2013–present)
- Joseph Morelle, U.S. Representative for NY-25 (2018–present)
- Jerry Nadler, U.S. Representative for NY-10 (2013–present)
- Alexandria Ocasio-Cortez, U.S. Representative for NY-14 (2019–present)
- Kathleen Rice, U.S. Representative for NY-04 (2015–present)
- Ritchie Torres, U.S. Representative for NY-15 (2021–present)
- Nydia Velázquez, U.S. Representative for NY-07 (2013–present)

State officials

- Michael Gianaris, state senator from the 12th district (2011–present), Deputy Majority Leader of the New York State Senate (2019–present), and state assemblymember from the 36th district (2001–2010)
- Rodneyse Bichotte Hermelyn, state assemblymember from the 47th district (2015–present)
- Kathy Hochul, Governor of New York (2021–present), Lieutenant Governor of New York (2015–2021), U.S. Representative for NY-26 (2011–2013)
- Shelley Mayer, state senator from the 37th district (2018–present)
- Clyde Vanel, state assemblymember from the 33rd district (2017–present)

Local officials

- Eric Adams, Mayor of New York City (2022–present) and Brooklyn Borough President (2014–2022)

Individuals

- Zephyr Teachout, Fordham University law professor, candidate for governor in 2014, nominee for NY-19 in 2016, and candidate for attorney general in 2018
- Maria Vullo, former Superintendent of the New York State Department of Financial Services

Organizations

- Everytown for Gun Safety Action Fund
- Hotel Trades Council, New York hotel workers' union
Zephyr Teachout (withdrew)

State officials

- Keith Ellison, Attorney General of Minnesota (2019–present); U.S. Representative for MN-05 (2007–2019)
- Emily Gallagher, state assemblymember from the 50th district (2021–present)
- Anna Kelles, state assemblymember from the 125th district (2021–present)
- Ron Kim, state assemblymember from the 40th district (2013–present)
- Phillip Steck, state assemblymember from the 110th district (2013–present)

Local officials

- Mark Green, New York City Public Advocate (1994–2001)
- Svante Myrick, Mayor of Ithaca (2012–2022)

Individuals

- Lawrence Lessig, Harvard Law School professor; candidate for the Democratic nomination for president of the United States in 2016

=== Polling ===
Poll source	Date(s) administered	Sample size (Note: Key: A – all adults RV – registered voters LV – likely voters V – unclear)	Margin of error	Andrew Cuomo	Michael Gianaris	Daniel Goldman	Eric Gonzalez	Letitia James	Melinda Katz	Sean Patrick Maloney	Shelley Mayer	Kathleen Rice	Zephyr Teachout	Clyde Vanel	Maria Vullo	Other	Undecided
Emerson College	March 9–10, 2022	504 (LV)	± 4.3%	–	–	–	–	47%	–	–	–	–	–	–	–	25%	28%
Emerson College	March 9–10, 2022	504 (LV)	± 4.3%	33%	–	–	–	45%	–	–	–	–	–	–	–	13%	9%
Data for Progress (D) (Note: This poll was sponsored by Neal Kwatra on behalf of an unnamed donor)	November 16–17, 2021	528 (LV)	± 4.0%	–	2%	5%	7%	–	7%	8%	2%	7%	15%	1%	1%	–	48%

== Republican primary ==
Two candidates, John Sarcone and Michael Henry, competed for the Republican nomination. In a surprise move, Sarcone declined to be nominated at the state Republican convention, leading to Henry earning the endorsement unanimously.

=== Candidates ===
==== Nominee ====
- Michael Henry, attorney

==== Declined ====
- Joseph H. Holland, former Commissioner of the New York State Department of Housing and Community Renewal; candidate for attorney general in 1994 and 2018

==== Withdrew ====
- John Sarcone, former General Services Administration official

==== Endorsements ====
Michael Henry

Federal officials

- Elise Stefanik, United States Representative in Congress (2015–present)

Organizations

- New York Young Republican Club

== Conservative primary ==
=== Candidates ===
==== Nominee ====
- Michael Henry, attorney

== General election ==
=== Predictions ===
Source	Ranking	As of
Sabato's Crystal Ball	Safe D	September 14, 2022
Elections Daily	Safe D	November 1, 2022

=== Post-primary endorsements ===
Letitia James (D)

Newspapers

- The Buffalo News
- Newsday
- The Post-Standard
- Times Union
Michael Henry (R)

Newspapers

- New York Post

=== Polling ===
Graphical summary

Poll source	Date(s) administered	Sample size	Margin of error	Letitia James (D)	Michael Henry (R)	Other	Undecided
KAConsulting (R) (Note: Poll conducted for Citizens United, a conservative non-profit organization.)	October 27–29, 2022	501 (LV)	± 4.4%	47%	41%	–	8%
Data for Progress (D)	October 26–28, 2022	818 (LV)	± 3.0%	55%	40%	–	6%
Slingshot Strategies (D)	October 25–26, 2022	1,000 (LV)	± 3.1%	48%	36%	–	16%
Siena College	October 12–14, 2022	707 (LV)	± 4.9%	51%	40%	1% (Note: "Not going to vote" with 1%; "Another candidate" with 0%)	8%
The Trafalgar Group (R)	September 30 – October 3, 2022	1,087 (LV)	± 2.9%	44%	45%	0%	10%
Siena College	September 16–25, 2022	655 (LV)	± 3.9%	53%	37%	1% (Note: "Not going to vote" with 1%)	9%
The Trafalgar Group (R)	August 31 – September 1, 2022	1,091 (LV)	± 2.9%	43%	44%	0%	13%
Emerson College	July 26–28, 2022	1,000 (LV)	± 3.0%	50%	32%	4%	12%
Siena College	July 24–28, 2022	806 (LV)	± 3.5%	50%	36%	0%	13%

Hypothetical polling

Generic Democrat vs. generic Republican with Andrew Cuomo as an independent

Poll source	Date(s) administered	Sample size	Margin of error	Generic Democrat	Generic Republican	Andrew Cuomo (I)	Undecided
Emerson College	March 9–10, 2022	1,000 (RV)	± 3.0%	36%	34%	13%	17%

=== Results ===
2022 New York Attorney General election
Party	Candidate	Votes	%	±%
Democratic	Letitia James	2,875,687	49.58%	−8.77
Working Families	Letitia James	292,569	5.05%	+2.51
Total	Letitia James (incumbent)	3,168,256	54.60%	−7.79
Republican	Michael Henry	2,317,573	39.96%	+9.07
Conservative	Michael Henry	313,728	5.41%	+1.12
Total	Michael Henry	2,631,301	45.35%	+10.17
Write ins	Write ins	3,073	0.05%	+0.00
Total votes		5,802,630	100.0%	
Democratic hold				

==== By county ====
County	Letitia James Democratic		Michael Henry Republican		Write-ins	
County	#	%	#	%	#	%
Albany	70,637	61.1%	44,838	38.8%	9	0.1%
Allegany	4,001	25.7%	11,561	74.3%	0	0.0%
Bronx	154,433	79.3%	40,272	20.7%	9	0.0%
Broome	30,929	46.1%	38,173	53.9%	2	0.0%
Cattaraugus	8,072	31.7%	17,419	68.3%	0	0.0%
Cayuga	10,495	39.5%	16,050	60.4%	0	0.0%
Chautauqua	15,489	36.2%	27,304	63.8%	1	0.0%
Chemung	9,991	36.5%	17,366	63.4%	2	0.1%
Chenango	5,323	32.1%	11,242	67.8%	1	0.1%
Clinton	12,800	47.3%	14,269	52.7%	0	0.0%
Columbia	16,421	55.8%	13,003	44.2%	0	0.0%
Cortland	6,918	43.4%	9,020	56.6%	0	0.0%
Delaware	6,806	37.0%	11,596	63.0%	1	0.0%
Dutchess	56,201	49.4%	57,454	50.5%	4	0.1%
Erie	178,269	53.1%	157,100	46.8%	16	0.1%
Essex	7,269	48.0%	7,863	52.0%	0	0.0%
Franklin	6,541	44.0%	8,344	56.0%	0	0.0%
Fulton	5,539	30.4%	12,712	69.6%	0	0.0%
Genesee	6,345	29.0%	15,524	71.0%	0	0.0%
Greene	7,735	39.0%	12,084	61.0%	0	0.0%
Hamilton	885	31.6%	1,914	68.4%	0	0.0%
Herkimer	5,633	26.7%	15,453	73.3%	0	0.0%
Jefferson	10,463	33.6%	20,702	66.4%	0	0.0%
Kings	412,066	74.2%	142,542	25.7%	56	0.1%
Lewis	2,518	24.6%	7,733	75.4%	0	0.0%
Livingston	8,156	34.2%	15,687	65.8%	0	0.0%
Madison	10,434	40.2%	15,479	59.7%	2	0.1%
Monroe	147,795	54.2%	124,594	45.7%	13	0.1%
Montgomery	5,416	35.0%	10,083	65.0%	0	0.0%
Nassau	233,574	45.7%	277,689	54.3%	15	0.0%
New York	367,269	82.5%	77,552	17.4%	48	0.1%
Niagara	29,816	39.9%	44,922	60.1%	2	0.0%
Oneida	26,816	36.2%	47,219	63.8%	2	0.0%
Onondaga	91,779	54.7%	76,073	45.3%	6	0.0%
Ontario	20,009	44.0%	25,488	56.0%	1	0.0%
Orange	56,555	46.4%	65,135	53.5%	6	0.1%
Orleans	3,343	25.2%	9,942	74.8%	0	0.0%
Oswego	13,470	34.0%	26,158	66.0%	1	0.0%
Otsego	9,272	42.7%	12,441	57.3%	1	0.0%
Putnam	16,484	40.4%	24,330	59.6%	1	0.0%
Queens	277,817	64.9%	149,712	35.0%	34	0.1%
Rensselaer	29,571	48.1%	31,848	51.8%	2	0.1%
Richmond	47,767	34.3%	91,297	65.6%	7	0.1%
Rockland	49,808	48.3%	53,281	51.6%	11	0.1%
St. Lawrence	13,193	39.6%	20,094	60.4%	0	0.0%
Saratoga	48,932	47.7%	53,700	52.3%	2	0.0%
Schenectady	29,176	52.6%	25,310	47.3%	3	0.1%
Schoharie	4,150	32.8%	8,517	67.2%	0	0.0%
Schuyler	2,756	36.1%	4,881	63.9%	0	0.0%
Seneca	4,597	40.4%	6,784	59.6%	0	0.0%
Steuben	10,052	29.5%	23,984	70.5%	0	0.0%
Suffolk	236,808	42.6%	318,768	57.4%	9	0.0%
Sullivan	10,094	41.7%	14,088	58.2%	1	0.1%
Tioga	6,417	34.3%	12,314	65.7%	0	0.0%
Tompkins	25,314	72.9%	9,375	27.0%	2	0.1%
Ulster	44,983	58.4%	32,073	41.6%	3	0.0%
Warren	12,763	46.1%	14,932	53.9%	1	0.0%
Washington	8,366	38.4%	13,383	61.5%	1	0.1%
Wayne	10,934	33.0%	22,189	67.0%	1	0.0%
Westchester	197,381	61.1%	125,701	38.9%	7	0.0%
Wyoming	3,461	23.0%	11,573	77.0%	0	0.0%
Yates	2,949	36.4%	5,167	63.6%	0	0.0%
Totals	3,168,256	54.60%	2,631,301	45.35%	3,073	0.05%

Counties that flipped from Democratic to Republican

- Clinton (largest municipality: Plattsburgh)
- Essex (largest municipality: Ticonderoga)
- Franklin (largest municipality: Malone)
- Cortland (largest municipality: Cortland)
- Broome (largest municipality: Binghamton)
- Dutchess (county seat: Poughkeepsie)
- Rensselaer (County Seat: Troy)
- Rockland (county seat: New City)
- Nassau (largest municipality: Hempstead)
- Orange (largest municipality: Kiryas Joel)
- Richmond (Staten Island, borough of New York City)
- Suffolk (largest municipality: Brookhaven)

==== By congressional district ====
James won 16 of 26 congressional districts, including one that elected a Republican.

District	James	Henry	Representative
1st	44%	56%	Lee Zeldin (117th Congress)
1st	44%	56%	Nick LaLota (118th Congress)
2nd	41%	59%	Andrew Garbarino
3rd	45%	55%	Tom Suozzi (117th Congress)
3rd	45%	55%	George Santos (118th Congress)
4th	48%	52%	Kathleen Rice (117th Congress)
4th	48%	52%	Anthony D'Esposito (118th Congress)
5th	75%	25%	Gregory Meeks
6th	57%	43%	Grace Meng
7th	79%	21%	Nydia Velázquez
8th	72%	28%	Hakeem Jeffries
9th	72%	28%	Yvette Clarke
10th	83%	17%	Jerry Nadler (117th Congress)
10th	83%	17%	Dan Goldman (118th Congress)
11th	37%	63%	Nicole Malliotakis
12th	80%	20%	Carolyn Maloney (117th Congress)
12th	80%	20%	Jerry Nadler (118th Congress)
13th	88%	12%	Adriano Espaillat
14th	72%	28%	Alexandria Ocasio-Cortez
15th	81%	19%	Ritchie Torres
16th	64%	36%	Jamaal Bowman
17th	50.4%	49.6%	Mondaire Jones (117th Congress)
17th	50.4%	49.6%	Mike Lawler (118th Congress)
18th	51%	49%	Sean Patrick Maloney (117th Congress)
18th	51%	49%	Pat Ryan (118th Congress)
19th	48%	52%	Pat Ryan (117th Congress)
19th	48%	52%	Marc Molinaro (118th Congress)
20th	55%	45%	Paul Tonko
21st	39%	61%	Elise Stefanik
22nd	48%	52%	Claudia Tenney (117th Congress)
22nd	48%	52%	Brandon Williams (118th Congress)
23rd	37%	63%	Joe Sempolinski (117th Congress)
23rd	37%	63%	Nick Langworthy (118th Congress)
24th	35%	65%	John Katko (117th Congress)
24th	35%	65%	Claudia Tenney (118th Congress)
25th	54%	46%	Joseph Morelle
26th	58%	42%	Brian Higgins

== Notes ==
Partisan clients
