= 2022 New York state elections =

- November 8, 2022

Elections were held in the State of New York on November 8, 2022. On this date, the state held elections for the following offices: Governor and Lieutenant Governor (on one ticket), Attorney General, Comptroller, U.S. Senate, U.S. House of Representatives, New York State Senate, New York State Assembly, and various others. Primary elections took place on June 28 and August 23, 2022. This election cycle was highlighted by a redistricting process in which there were many election maps that were ultimately ruled to be unconstitutional Democratic gerrymanders.

The Republican Party performed much more strongly in New York than it did in other parts of the country during the 2022 United States elections, leading the state's election to be termed a "localized red wave".

== Governor and lieutenant governor ==
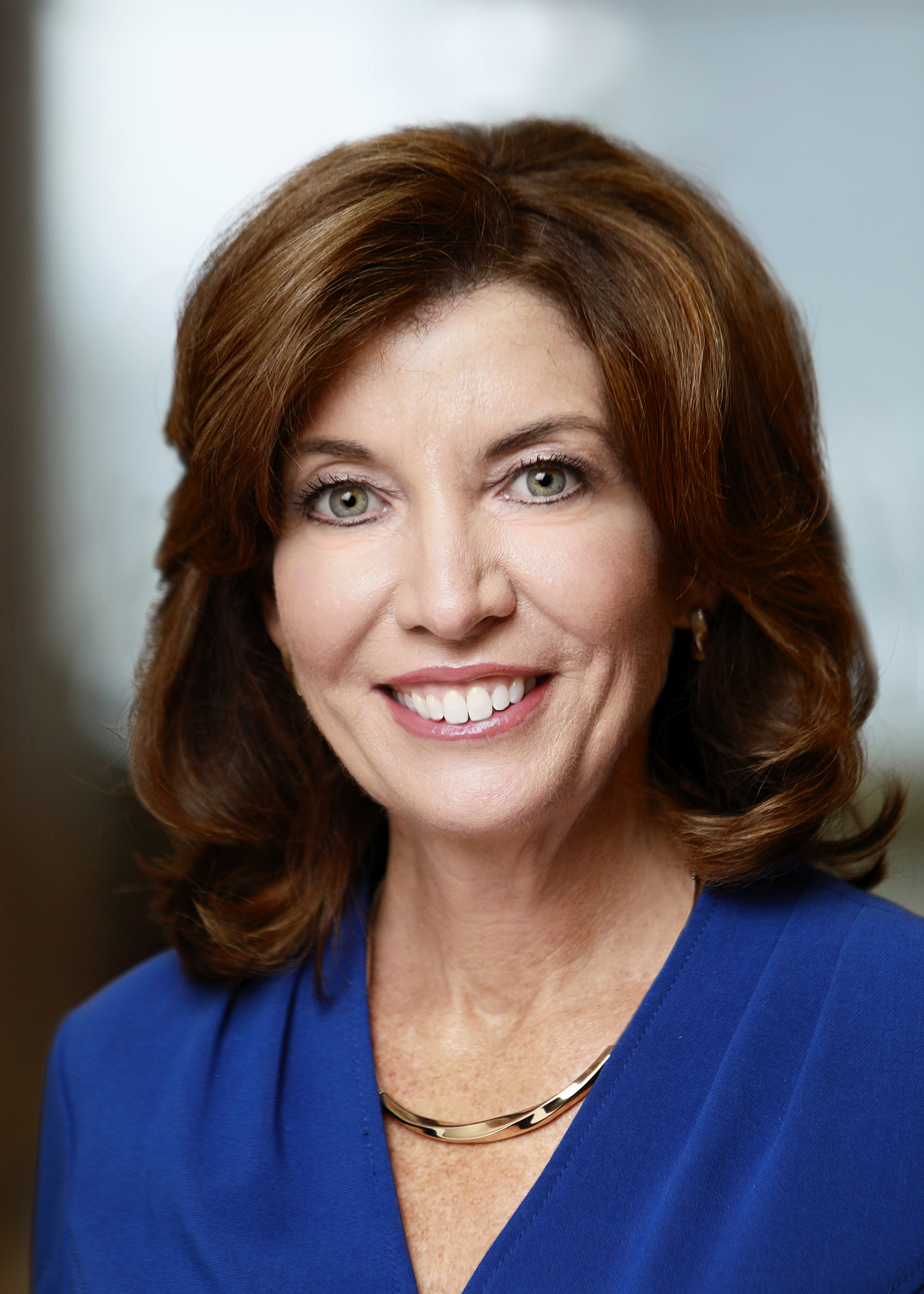
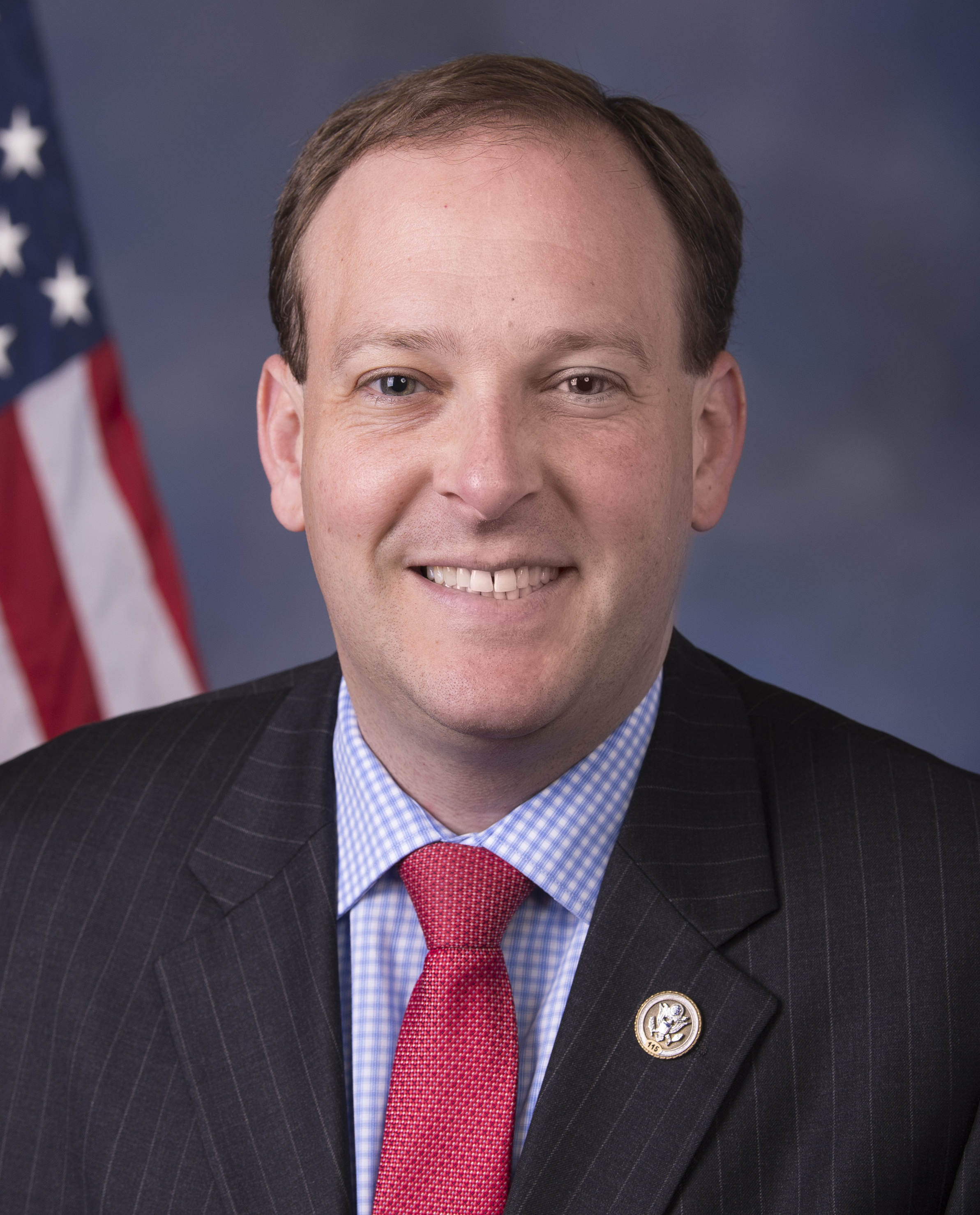
Democratic nominee Kathy Hochul (left), and Republican nominee Lee Zeldin (right)

Democratic governor Andrew Cuomo was elected a third term in 2018. After a series of incidents including a scandal involving nursing home deaths in the COVID-19 pandemic and multiple accusations of sexual harassment, Cuomo resigned in August 2021. Cuomo's Lieutenant Governor, Kathy Hochul, then became the first female governor of New York. Hochul selected Bronx State Senator Brian Benjamin to fill the role of lieutenant governor, and Benjamin served in the role from September 2021 until he was arrested for bribery and resigned in April 2022. Hochul and former Congressman Antonio Delgado each won contested three-way primaries to receive the Democratic nomination for governor.

Congressman Lee Zeldin was the Republican nominee after defeating three high-profile primary challengers. Alison Esposito, a former NYPD employee, was Zeldin's running mate. She was the first openly gay party nominee in state history. Zeldin was endorsed by several Democrats.

Zeldin would lose to Hochul by 6.4%, the best NY GOP gubernatorial performance since 2002, and the best NY GOP gubernatorial raw number since 1970. Hochul had the closest NY Democrat gubernatorial win since Mario Cuomo's 1982 win by just 3.4%. Zeldin's performance has been credited as having a major down-ballot boost for other GOP candidates, helping in part to flip seats in the U.S. House and state legislature for the GOP.

== Attorney general ==
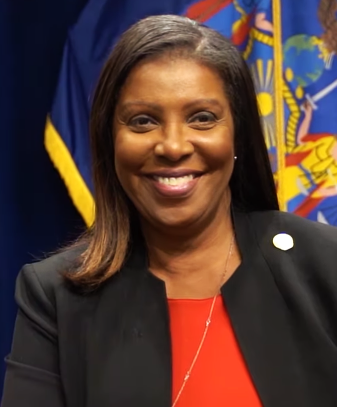
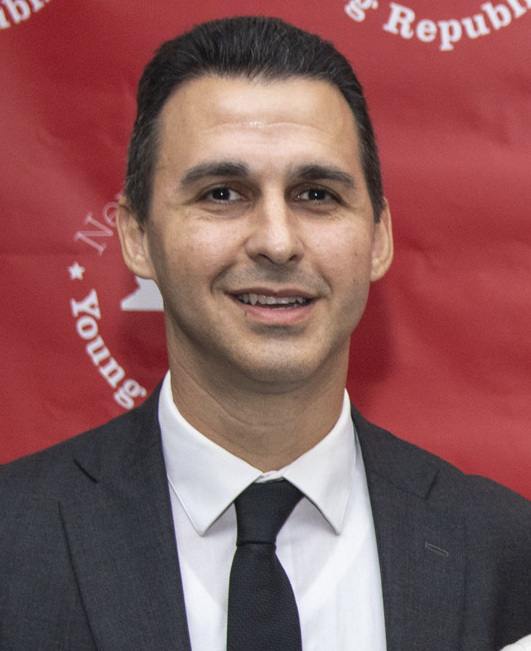
Democratic nominee Letitia James (left), and Republican nominee Michael Henry (right)

Letitia James, the former New York City Public Advocate, was first elected to be attorney general in 2018. James originally challenged Hochul and ran for governor, but later opted to run for re-election instead. Michael Henry, an attorney from Queens, unanimously won the Republican nomination in a surprise. James was re-elected by a nine-point margin.

== Comptroller ==
Democrat Thomas DiNapoli had been the New York State Comptroller since 2007. He received his party's nomination to run for a fifth term. Paul Rodríguez, who previously ran in the 2021 New York City Comptroller election, was the Republican nominee. Rodríguez is a financial advisor and nonprofit developer with a Puerto Rican background. He was raised by a Spanish-speaking single mother in Queens. DiNapoli was re-elected by the widest margin for any statewide Democrat on the ballot.

== United States Senate ==
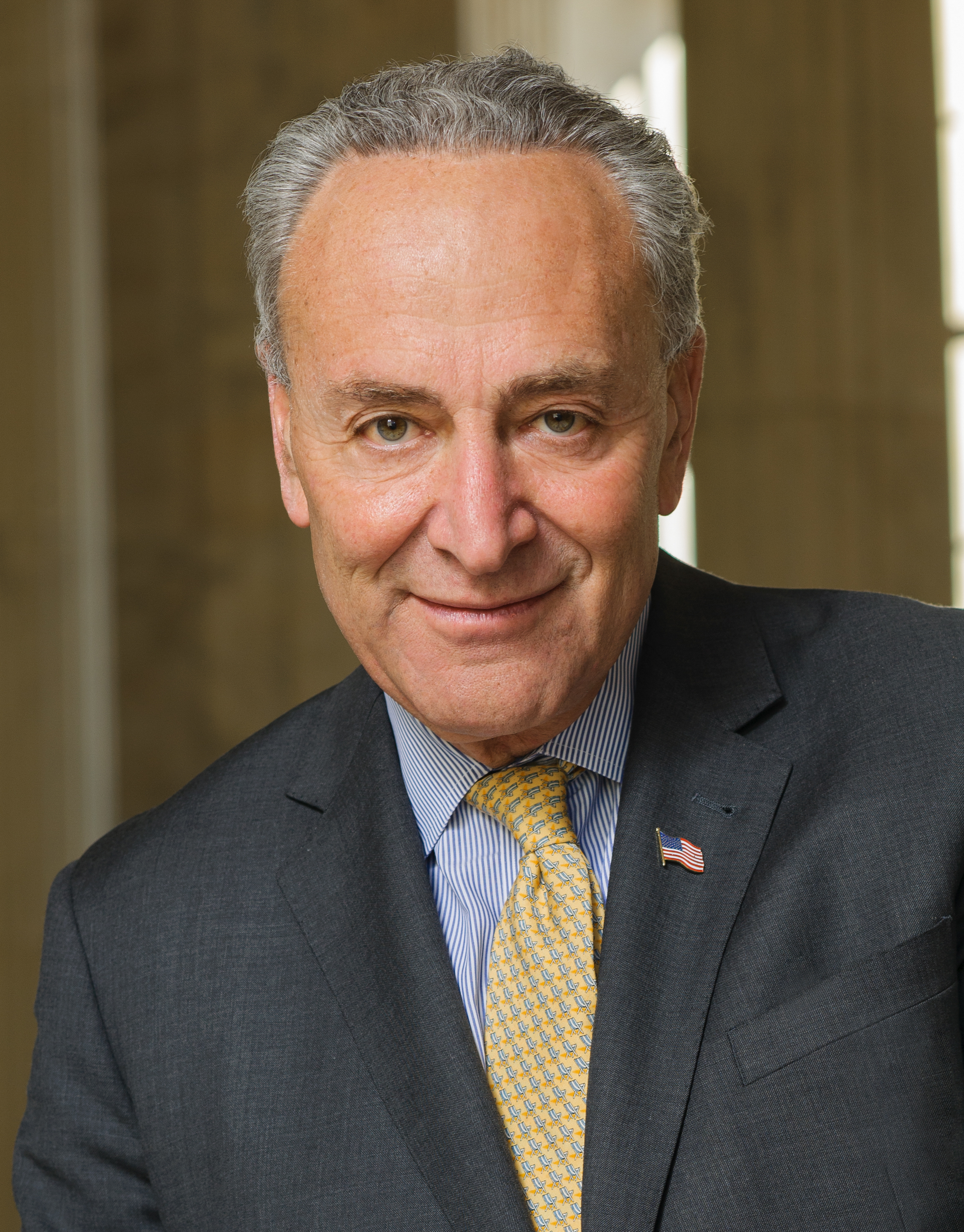
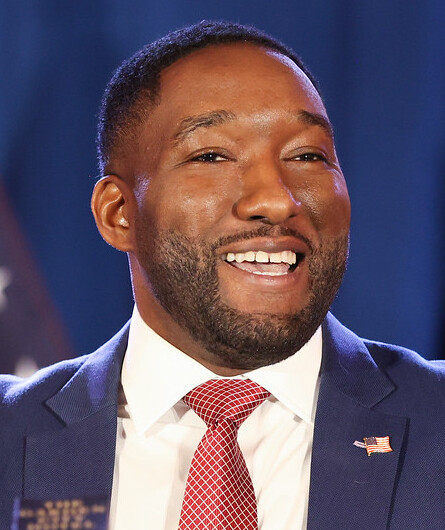
Democratic nominee Chuck Schumer (left), and Republican nominee Joe Pinion (right)

Incumbent senator Chuck Schumer, a Democrat and the Senate Majority Leader, was reelected for a fifth term. Republican challenger Joe Pinion, a former TV host, is the first black individual to receive a major party's senate nomination in New York history.

== United States House of Representatives ==
Elections for all 26 house districts in New York occurred. New York lost a congressional seat following the most recent census.

The congressional map that was going to be used for the cycle was ruled an unconstitutional Democratic gerrymander by a judge, so a new map was drawn by a special master that was used this cycle.

District 3, District 4, District 17, District 18, District 19, and District 22 were all listed as a tossup by at least one source.

Democrats lost four seats by losing the 3rd, 4th, 17th, and 19th districts; however, Republicans only gained three, as they lost a seat through redistricting.

== New York State Senate ==
Elections for all 63 state senate districts were held. This was the first election in which a new election map was used, as redistricting occurred after each census cycle. Despite having an Independent Redistricting Committee, the Democrat-dominated legislature attempted to pass a map that was called gerrymandering by many, and a judge ultimately ruled that a new and fairer map must be drawn. The redrawn map was used during this cycle.

Democrats held a supermajority in the state senate. CNalysis gave Republicans a 40% chance of breaking the supermajority. Ultimately, Democrats lost one seat and maintained their supermajority.

== New York State Assembly ==
Elections for all 150 state assembly districts were held. This was the first election in which a new district map, drawn by Democratic legislators, was used. However, a judge ruled that this map was unconstitutional, and that a new map had to be drawn by the 2024 election.

Democrats held a supermajority in the state assembly, and CNalysis gave Republicans a 36% chance of breaking the supermajority. Democrats ultimately lost five seats and maintained their supermajority.
