= Sandy Galef =

Former Member of New York State Assembly

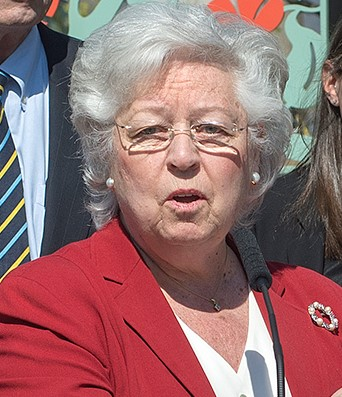
- Galef in 2013

Member of the New York State Assembly from the 95th district
- In office January 1, 2013 – December 31, 2022
- Preceded by: Incumbent
- Succeeded by: Dana Levenberg

Member of the New York State Assembly from the 90th district
- In office January 1, 1993 – December 31, 2012
- Preceded by: George Pataki
- Succeeded by: Redistricted

Minority Leader of the Westchester County Board of Legislators
- In office January 1, 1984 – December 31, 1992

Westchester County Legislator from the 9th District
- In office January 1, 1983 – December 31, 1992

Westchester County Legislator from the 2nd District
- In office January 1, 1980 – December 31, 1982

Personal details
- Born: Sandra Risk; May 7, 1940 (age 86) La Crosse, Wisconsin, U.S.
- Party: Democratic
- Spouse: Steven Galef (married 1963-1998)
- Children: 2
- Education: Purdue University (B.A.); University of Virginia (M.A.)
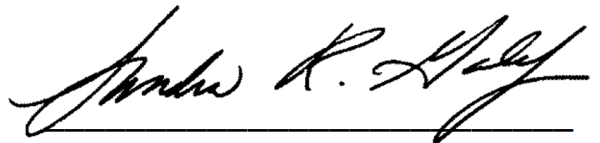
- Signature

Sandra Galef (née Risk; born May 7, 1940) is an American politician who served as a member of the New York State Assembly for 30 years.

== Early life and career ==
Galef was born Sandra Risk in LaCrosse, Wisconsin on May 7, 1940. In 1944, she moved with her family to Westchester County in New York. She received a B.A. from Purdue University and an M.A. in education from the University of Virginia, and began her career as a teacher in a rural schoolhouse near Charlottesville, Virginia. Then, Galef moved back to New York, where she worked as a teacher in Scarsdale, New York. In 1963, she married Steven Galef, a former Westchester County legislator and attorney, with whom she had two children; she remained married to Steven until his death in 1998. She is Jewish.

== Legislative career ==
In 1980, Galef was elected to the Westchester County Board of Legislators, where she represented the 2nd and 9th Districts and served as the minority leader from 1984 until 1992, when she was elected to the Assembly.

Galef was elected to the 90th Assembly District and began her term in 1993. During her time in the Assembly, Galef chaired the Real Property Tax Committee, the Libraries and Education Technology Committee, and the Subcommittee for Rural Health, and was a member of the Corporations, Authorities, and Commissions Committee, the Election Law Committee, the Governmental Operations Committee, and the Health Committee.

In 1997, Galef introduced an amendment to make the language of the New York State Constitution gender neutral. Galef argued that the gendered language of the Constitution was "old-fashioned" and that a change to gender neutral language was "symbolically ... important". New York voters adopted the amendment in November 2001. In 1999, Galef was an early supporter of charter schools in New York. Galef also supported several good government causes, including measures to build consensus with Republican members of the assembly, campaign finance reform, and staff budget parity between the majority and the minority in the Assembly.

In December 2022, Governor Kathy Hochul signed a bill introduced by Galef that allows city and town clerks to issue a one-day permit to a non-ordained individual to officiate a specific wedding in New York.

Throughout her legislative career, Galef hosted two television shows, "Dear Sandy" and "Speakout with Sandy Galef", on public access television.

New York State Assembly
Preceded by George Pataki	New York State Assembly, 95th District; 1993–2022	Succeeded by Dana Levenberg
