= 2022 United States Senate election in New York =

- November 8, 2022
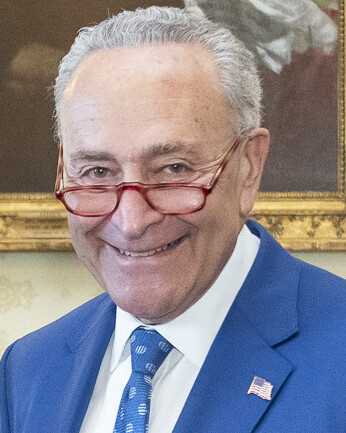

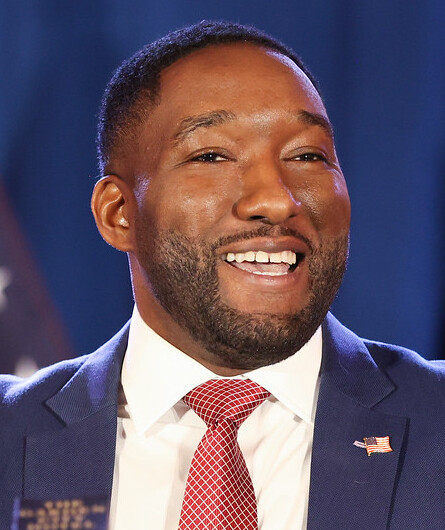
Nominee	Chuck Schumer	Joe Pinion
Party	Democratic	Republican
Alliance	Working Families	Conservative
Popular vote	3,320,561	2,501,151
Percentage	56.74%	42.73%
- Schumer: 40–50% 50–60% 60–70% 70–80% 80–90% >90% Pinion: 40–50% 50–60% 60–70% 70–80% 80–90% >90% Tie: 40–50% 50% No votes
U.S. senator before election
Chuck Schumer
Democratic
Elected U.S. senator
Chuck Schumer
Democratic

The 2022 United States Senate election in New York was held on November 8, 2022, to elect a member of the United States Senate to represent the State of New York.

Incumbent four-term Democratic Senator Chuck Schumer, who had served as Senate Majority Leader since 2021, was first elected in 1998, defeating Republican incumbent Al D'Amato. Schumer ran for a fifth term. Republican Joe Pinion is the first black Senate nominee of any major party in New York history. The filing deadline for the June primary was April 7, 2022. Schumer became the longest-serving U.S. senator in the state's history once his fifth term began in the 118th Congress.

Though Schumer was comfortably re-elected by a margin of 14.01%, he lost significant support on Long Island and Upstate New York compared to his last election in 2016. Pinion flipped the more conservative counties that Schumer had won in his previous runs, as well as some Democratic-leaning counties such as Nassau, Saratoga, Broome, Clinton, and Essex. However, Schumer's lead was large enough in New York City that most media outlets called the race in his favor the moment the polls closed.

Despite Democrats overperforming expectations on a national level during this cycle, this race was the most competitive in Schumer's Senate career since his first election in 1998, when he won by 10.5%, along with being the closest U.S. Senate election from New York since Hillary Clinton won by about 12.3 percentage points in 2000. This was due to an overall Democratic underperformance in New York state despite their overperformance nationally, and Schumer's performance was still the highest margin of victory (aside from Thomas DiNapoli in the concurrent comptroller election) on the statewide ballot.

== Democratic primary ==
=== Candidates ===
==== Nominee ====
- Chuck Schumer, incumbent U.S. senator and Senate majority leader

==== Disqualified ====
- Moses Mugulusi, regulator
- Khaled Salem, activist

==== Declined ====
- Alessandra Biaggi, state senator from the 34th district (ran for U.S. House)
- Jamaal Bowman, U.S. representative for New York's 16th congressional district (ran for re-election)
- Andrew Cuomo, former governor of New York, former attorney general of New York, and former U.S. secretary of housing and urban development
- Mondaire Jones, U.S. representative for New York's 17th congressional district (ran for re-election)
- Alexandria Ocasio-Cortez, U.S. representative for New York's 14th congressional district (ran for re-election)
- Jumaane Williams, New York City public advocate and former New York City Councilor for the 45th district (ran for governor)

=== Endorsements ===
Chuck Schumer

Statewide officials

- Letitia James, attorney general of New York (2019–present)

Organizations

- Civil Service Employees Association
- Feminist Majority PAC
- Jewish Dems
- NRDC Action Fund
- Population Connection Action Fund
- Pro-Israel America
- Public Employees Federation

=== Polling ===
Hypothetical polling

Poll source	Date(s) administered	Sample size (Note: Key: A – all adults RV – registered voters LV – likely voters V – unclear)	Margin of error	Chuck Schumer	Alexandria Ocasio-Cortez	Undecided
Zogby Analytics	May 7–9, 2020	328 (LV)	± 5.4%	54%	21%	25%

== Republican primary ==
At the 2022 New York State Republican Convention, Joe Pinion was designated as the New York State Republican Party's preferred candidate for U.S. Senate. Pinion became the first Black individual to be backed by a major party in a U.S. Senate election in New York.

=== Candidates ===
==== Nominee ====
- Joe Pinion, entrepreneur, TV host and candidate for New York State Assembly in 2018

==== Disqualified ====
- Aleksander Mici, lawyer and candidate for New York City Council in 2021

==== Declined ====
- Andrew Giuliani, former Trump administration official, son of Rudy Giuliani and Newsmax TV contributor (ran for governor)
- John Katko, U.S. representative for New York's 24th congressional district
- Tom Reed, former U.S. representative for New York's 23rd congressional district
- Lee Zeldin, U.S. representative for New York's 1st congressional district and former state senator from the 3rd district (ran for governor)

=== Endorsements ===
Joe Pinion

U.S. representatives

- Elise Stefanik, U.S. representative from New York's 21st congressional district (2015–present) and chair of the House Republican Conference (2021–2025)

Organizations

- New York Young Republican Club

== Conservative primary ==
=== Candidates ===
==== Nominee ====
- Joe Pinion, TV host and candidate for New York State Assembly in 2018

== Working Families primary ==
=== Candidates ===
==== Nominee ====
- Chuck Schumer, incumbent U.S. senator

== Other candidates ==
Diane Sare ran on an Independent ballot line labeled "LaRouche."

== General election ==
=== Predictions ===
Source	Ranking	As of
The Cook Political Report	Solid D	November 19, 2021
Inside Elections	Solid D	January 7, 2022
Sabato's Crystal Ball	Safe D	November 3, 2021
Politico	Solid D	April 1, 2022
RCP	Likely D	October 18, 2022
Fox News	Solid D	May 12, 2022
DDHQ	Solid D	July 20, 2022
538	Solid D	June 30, 2022
The Economist	Solid D	September 7, 2022

=== Endorsements ===
Chuck Schumer (D)

Federal officials

- Joe Biden, president of the United States (2021–2025)

Statewide officials

- Letitia James, attorney general of New York (2019–present)

Individuals

- Lin-Manuel Miranda, actor and lyricist

Organizations

- AIPAC
- Citizen Action of New York
- Civil Service Employees Association
- Feminist Majority PAC
- Humane Society Legislative Fund
- Jewish Dems
- NARAL Pro-Choice America
- National Association of Social Workers
- National Education Association
- Natural Resources Defense Council
- New York AFL–CIO
- New York State Nurses Association
- New York State Public Employees Federation
- New York State United Teachers
- Newtown Action Alliance
- Planned Parenthood
- Population Connection Action Fund
- Pro-Israel America
- Public Employees Federation
- Sierra Club
- Stonewall Democrats
- United Federation of Teachers

Newspapers

- The Buffalo News
- The Post-Standard
- Times Union
Joe Pinion (R)

U.S. representatives

- Elise Stefanik, U.S. representative from New York's 21st congressional district (2015–present) and chair of the House Republican Conference (2021–present)

Organizations

- New York Federation of College Republicans
- New York State Troopers Police Benevolent Association
- New York Young Republican Club

=== Polling ===
Aggregate polls

Source of poll aggregation	Dates administered	Dates updated	Chuck Schumer (D)	Joe Pinion (R)	Undecided (Note: Calculated by taking the difference of 100% and all other candidates combined.)	Margin
Real Clear Politics	October 26–31, 2022	November 8, 2022	54.7%	39.3%	6.0%	Schumer +15.4
FiveThirtyEight	October 12 – November 8, 2022	November 8, 2022	55.7%	38.0%	6.3%	Schumer +17.7
270towin	October 26 – November 7, 2022	November 8, 2022	54.6%	38.6%	6.8%	Schumer +16.0
Average			55.0%	38.6%	6.4%	Schumer +16.4

Graphical summary

Poll source	Date(s) administered	Sample size	Margin of error	Chuck Schumer (D)	Joe Pinion (R)	Other	Undecided
Research Co.	November 4–6, 2022	450 (LV)	± 4.6%	55%	37%	2% (Note: "Some other candidate" with 2%)	6%
ActiVote (D)	August 8 – November 6, 2022	279 (LV)	± 6.0%	60%	40%	–	–
Emerson College	October 28–31, 2022	1,000 (LV)	± 3.0%	55%	36%	3% (Note: Sare (I) with 1%; "Someone else" with 2%)	6%
Emerson College	October 28–31, 2022	1,000 (LV)	± 3.0%	57%	39%	4% (Note: Sare (I) with 1%; "Someone else" with 3%)	–
The Trafalgar Group (R)	October 27–31, 2022	1,198 (LV)	± 2.9%	51%	40%	5% (Note: Sare (I) with 5%)	4%
KAConsulting (R) (Note: Poll conducted for Citizens United, a conservative non-profit organization.)	October 27–29, 2022	501 (LV)	± 4.4%	50%	38%	–	7%
Data for Progress (D)	October 26–28, 2022	818 (LV)	± 3.0%	56%	39%	–	5%
Long Island University	October 24–26, 2022	1,001 (A)	± 3.0%	54%	27%	9% (Note: "Not planning to vote" with 6%; "Another candidate" with 3%)	10%
Civiqs	October 22–25, 2022	593 (LV)	± 5.0%	56%	41%	1% (Note: "Someone else" with 1%)	2%
Emerson College	October 20–24, 2022	1,000 (LV)	± 3.0%	51%	36%	6% (Note: "Someone else" with 4%; Sare (I) with 2%)	8%
Emerson College	October 20–24, 2022	1,000 (LV)	± 3.0%	53%	40%	8% (Note: "Someone else" with 6%; Sare (I) with 2%)	–
SurveyUSA	October 14–18, 2022	702 (LV)	± 5.4%	52%	38%	4%	6%
Quinnipiac University	October 12–16, 2022	1,617 (LV)	± 2.4%	54%	42%	1% (Note: "Someone else" with 1%)	3%
Siena College	October 12–14, 2022	707 (LV)	± 4.9%	57%	37%	1% (Note: "Another candidate" with 1%; "Not going to vote" with 0%)	5%
Marist College	October 3–6, 2022	900 (LV)	± 4.4%	52%	39%	1% (Note: "Another party's candidate" with 1%)	8%
Marist College	October 3–6, 2022	1,117 (RV)	± 4.0%	54%	34%	1% (Note: "Another party's candidate" with 1%)	11%
Siena College	September 16–25, 2022	655 (LV)	± 3.9%	55%	36%	1% (Note: "Another candidate" with 1%)	8%
Emerson College	September 4–6, 2022	1,000 (LV)	± 3.0%	55%	31%	5% (Note: "Someone else" with 5%)	9%
McLaughlin & Associates (R)	August 7–9, 2022	600 (LV)	± 4.0%	51%	36%	–	13%
Emerson College	July 26–28, 2022	1,000 (LV)	± 3.0%	53%	31%	7%	8%
Siena College	July 24–28, 2022	806 (LV)	± 3.5%	56%	35%	0%	8%

Hypothetical polling

Chuck Schumer vs. generic opponent

Poll source	Date(s) administered	Sample size	Margin of error	Chuck Schumer (D)	Generic Opponent	Undecided
McLaughlin & Associates (R)	August 7–9, 2022	600 (LV)	± 4.0%	42%	48%	10%

=== Results ===
2022 United States Senate election in New York
Party	Candidate	Votes	%	±%
Democratic	Chuck Schumer	3,022,822	51.65%	−13.03%
Working Families	Chuck Schumer	297,739	5.09%	+1.82%
Total	Chuck Schumer (incumbent)	3,320,561	56.74%	−13.86%
Republican	Joe Pinion	2,204,499	37.66%	+14.35%
Conservative	Joe Pinion	296,652	5.07%	+1.45%
Total	Joe Pinion	2,501,151	42.73%	+15.56%
LaRouche	Diane Sare	26,844	0.46%	N/A
Write ins	Write ins	4,151	0.07%	
Total votes		5,852,707	100.0%	N/A
Democratic hold				

==== By county ====
County	Chuck Schumer Democratic		Joe Pinion Republican		Various candidates Other parties		Margin		Total
County	#	%	#	%	#	%	#	%	Total
Albany	72,875	62.7%	42,719	36.8%	603	0.5%	30,156	25.9%	116,197
Allegany	4,306	27.5%	11,277	72.0%	84	0.5%	-6,971	-44.5%	15,667
Bronx	158,433	80.6%	37,130	18.9%	1,004	0.5%	121,303	61.7%	196,567
Broome	32,587	48.1%	34,688	51.2%	478	0.7%	-2,101	-3.1%	67,753
Cattaraugus	8,677	33.7%	16,938	65.8%	125	0.5%	-8,261	-32.1%	25,740
Cayuga	11,527	43.0%	15,139	56.5%	132	0.5%	-3,612	-13.5%	26,798
Chautauqua	16,782	38.8%	26,217	60.7%	203	0.4%	-9,435	-21.9%	43,202
Chemung	10,500	38.1%	16,907	61.3%	162	0.6%	-6,407	-23.2%	27,569
Chenango	5,778	34.6%	10,805	64.7%	128	0.8%	-5,027	-30.1%	16,711
Clinton	13,341	48.9%	13,792	50.5%	170	0.6%	-451	-1.6%	27,303
Columbia	16,812	56.9%	12,633	42.8%	98	0.4%	4,179	14.1%	29,543
Cortland	7,469	46.5%	8,485	52.8%	111	0.7%	-1,016	-6.3%	16,065
Delaware	7,041	38.1%	11,316	61.3%	103	0.5%	-4,275	-23.2%	18,460
Dutchess	57,306	50.1%	56,353	49.3%	617	0.5%	953	0.8%	114,276
Erie	188,979	55.6%	148,585	43.7%	2,156	0.7%	40,394	11.9%	339,720
Essex	7,514	49.2%	7,654	50.2%	91	0.6%	-140	-1.0%	15,259
Franklin	6,885	45.8%	8,071	53.6%	90	0.6%	-1,186	-7.8%	15,046
Fulton	6,121	33.2%	12,191	66.1%	121	0.6%	-6,070	-32.9%	18,433
Genesee	7,056	31.9%	14,897	67.4%	135	0.6%	-7,841	-35.5%	22,088
Greene	8,026	40.4%	11,711	59.0%	124	0.6%	-19,861	-18.6%	19,861
Hamilton	969	34.3%	1,838	65.1%	16	0.6%	-869	-30.8%	2,823
Herkimer	6,999	31.6%	15,042	67.9%	122	0.5%	-8,043	-36.3%	22,163
Jefferson	11,618	36.9%	19,667	62.5%	158	0.5%	-8,049	-25.6%	31,443
Kings	423,867	76.1%	129,692	23.3%	3,446	0.7%	294,175	52.8%	557,005
Lewis	3,001	28.8%	7,372	70.8%	37	0.3%	-4,371	-42.0%	10,410
Livingston	9,029	37.4%	14,958	61.9%	171	0.7%	-5,929	-24.5%	24,158
Madison	11,440	43.7%	14,573	55.6%	176	0.7%	-3,133	-11.9%	26,189
Monroe	156,529	56.9%	117,075	42.5%	1,556	0.6%	39,454	14.4%	275,160
Montgomery	5,783	37.0%	9,764	62.5%	85	0.5%	-3,981	-25.5%	15,632
Nassau	248,186	48.2%	265,004	51.5%	1,468	0.2%	-16,818	-3.3%	514,658
New York	383,518	84.9%	65,366	14.5%	2,710	0.6%	318,152	70.4%	451,594
Niagara	31,950	42.3%	43,261	57.2%	400	0.5%	-11,311	-14.9%	75,611
Oneida	29,494	39.4%	44,899	60.0%	430	0.5%	-15,405	-20.6%	74,823
Onondaga	99,205	58.5%	69,374	40.9%	986	0.6%	29,831	17.6%	169,565
Ontario	21,626	47.0%	24,104	52.4%	253	0.5%	-2,478	-5.4%	45,983
Orange	58,364	47.7%	63,292	51.8%	604	0.5%	-4,928	-4.1%	122,260
Orleans	3,788	28.1%	9,609	71.3%	75	0.5%	-5,821	-43.2%	13,472
Oswego	14,909	37.3%	24,802	62.1%	157	0.8%	-9,893	-24.8%	39,968
Otsego	9,623	44.1%	12,042	55.2%	161	0.8%	-2,419	-11.1%	21,826
Putnam	17,019	41.5%	23,863	58.1%	168	0.4%	-6,844	-16.6%	41,050
Queens	291,905	67.5%	137,805	31.9%	2,878	0.7%	154,100	35.6%	432,588
Rensselaer	30,809	49.8%	30,662	49.5%	436	0.7%	147	0.3%	61,907
Richmond	50,985	36.5%	88,015	63.0%	664	0.5%	-37,030	-26.5%	139,664
Rockland	52,298	50.3%	51,183	49.3%	412	0.4%	1,115	1.0%	103,893
St. Lawrence	14,351	42.3%	19,389	57.1%	212	0.6%	-5,038	-14.8%	33,952
Saratoga	50,718	49.1%	52,030	50.4%	549	1.3%	1,312	1.3%	103,297
Schenectady	29,124	54.0%	24,440	45.3%	365	0.7%	4,684	8.7%	53,929
Schoharie	4,385	34.4%	8,254	64.8%	101	0.8%	-3,869	-30.4%	12,740
Schuyler	2,883	37.5%	4,759	61.9%	46	0.6%	-1,876	-24.4%	7,688
Seneca	5,035	43.8%	6,375	55.4%	92	0.8%	-1,340	-11.6%	11,502
Steuben	10,616	31.0%	23,456	68.5%	188	0.5%	-12,840	-37.5%	34,260
Suffolk	246,789	44.0%	311,254	55.6%	2,214	0.4%	-64,465	-11.6%	560,257
Sullivan	10,800	44.4%	13,385	55.0%	160	0.6%	-2,585	-10.6%	24,345
Tioga	6,743	35.8%	11,981	63.6%	123	0.7%	-5,238	-27.8%	18,847
Tompkins	25,928	73.8%	8,956	25.5%	269	0.8%	16,972	48.3%	35,153
Ulster	45,660	58.9%	31,327	40.4%	516	0.7%	14,333	18.5%	77,503
Warren	12,263	47.5%	14,452	51.8%	183	0.6%	-1,189	-4.3%	27,898
Washington	8,773	40.1%	12,987	59.3%	139	0.6%	-4,214	-19.2%	21,899
Wayne	11,983	35.8%	21,320	63.7%	164	0.5%	-9,337	-27.9%	33,467
Westchester	205,496	62.9%	119,891	36.7%	1,136	0.3%	85,605	26.2%	326,523
Wyoming	3,838	25.4%	11,191	74.0%	87	0.6%	-7,353	-48.6%	15,116
Yates	3,247	39.5%	4,934	60.0%	47	0.6%	-1,687	-20.5%	8,228
Totals	3,320,561	56.74%	2,501,151	42.73%	30,995	0.53%	819,410	14.01%	5,852,707

Counties that flipped from Democratic to Republican

- Broome (largest municipality: Binghamton)
- Cattaraugus (largest municipality: Olean)
- Cayuga (largest municipality: Auburn)
- Chautauqua (largest municipality: Jamestown)
- Chemung (largest municipality: Elmira)
- Chenango (largest municipality: Norwich)
- Clinton (largest municipality: Plattsburgh)
- Cortland (largest municipality: Cortland)
- Delaware (largest municipality: Sidney)
- Essex (largest municipality: Ticonderoga)
- Franklin (largest municipality: Malone)
- Fulton (largest municipality: Gloversville)
- Genesee (largest municipality: Batavia)
- Greene (largest municipality: Catskill)
- Herkimer (largest municipality: German Flatts)
- Jefferson (largest municipality: Le Ray)
- Lewis (largest municipality: Lowville)
- Livingston (largest municipality: Geneseo)
- Madison (largest municipality: Oneida)
- Montgomery (largest municipality: Amsterdam)
- Nassau (largest municipality: Hempstead)
- Niagara (largest municipality: Niagara Falls)
- Oneida (largest municipality: Utica)
- Ontario (largest municipality: Geneva)
- Orange (largest municipality: Kiryas Joel)
- Oswego (largest municipality: Oswego)
- Otsego (largest municipality: Oneonta)
- Putnam (largest municipality: Lake Carmel)
- Richmond (Staten Island, borough of New York City)
- St. Lawrence (largest municipality: Massena)
- Saratoga (largest municipality: Saratoga Springs)
- Schoharie (largest municipality: Cobleskill)
- Schuyler (largest municipality: Watkins Glen)
- Seneca (largest municipality: Seneca Falls)
- Suffolk (largest municipality: Brookhaven)
- Sullivan (largest municipality: Monticello)
- Tioga (largest municipality: Waverly)
- Warren (largest municipality: Glens Falls)
- Washington (largest municipality: Hudson Falls)
- Wayne (largest municipality: Newark)
- Yates (largest municipality: Penn Yan)

==== By congressional district ====
Schumer won 19 of 26 congressional districts, including four that elected Republicans.

District	Schumer	Pinion	Representative
1st	45%	54%	Lee Zeldin (117th Congress)
1st	45%	54%	Nick LaLota (118th Congress)
2nd	42%	58%	Andrew Garbarino
3rd	48%	52%	Tom Suozzi (117th Congress)
3rd	48%	52%	George Santos (118th Congress)
4th	50%	49%	Kathleen Rice (117th Congress)
4th	50%	49%	Anthony D'Esposito (118th Congress)
5th	76%	23%	Gregory Meeks
6th	60%	39%	Grace Meng
7th	81%	18%	Nydia Velázquez
8th	73%	27%	Hakeem Jeffries
9th	74%	25%	Yvette Clarke
10th	85%	15%	Jerry Nadler (117th Congress)
10th	85%	15%	Dan Goldman (118th Congress)
11th	40%	60%	Nicole Malliotakis
12th	83%	16%	Carolyn Maloney (117th Congress)
12th	83%	16%	Jerry Nadler (118th Congress)
13th	89%	11%	Adriano Espaillat
14th	74%	26%	Alexandria Ocasio-Cortez
15th	83%	17%	Ritchie Torres
16th	66%	33%	Jamaal Bowman
17th	52%	48%	Mondaire Jones (117th Congress)
17th	52%	48%	Mike Lawler (118th Congress)
18th	51%	48%	Sean Patrick Maloney (117th Congress)
18th	51%	48%	Pat Ryan (118th Congress)
19th	50%	49%	Pat Ryan (117th Congress)
19th	50%	49%	Marc Molinaro (118th Congress)
20th	56%	43%	Paul Tonko
21st	41%	58%	Elise Stefanik
22nd	52%	48%	Claudia Tenney (117th Congress)
22nd	52%	48%	Brandon Williams (118th Congress)
23rd	39%	60%	Joe Sempolinski (117th Congress)
23rd	39%	60%	Nick Langworthy (118th Congress)
24th	38%	61%	John Katko (117th Congress)
24th	38%	61%	Claudia Tenney (118th Congress)
25th	56%	43%	Joseph Morelle
26th	60%	39%	Brian Higgins

== See also ==
- 2022 United States Senate elections

== Notes ==
Partisan clients
