= New York's 90th State Assembly district =

American legislative district

Assemblymember
Nader Sayegh; D–Yonkers

New York's 90th State Assembly district is one of the 150 districts in the New York State Assembly. It has been represented by Democratic Assemblyman Nader Sayegh since 2019. In 2026, he announced that he would not seek re-election.

== Geography ==
District 90 is located entirely within Westchester County. It consists of a majority of Yonkers.

The district is entirely within New York's 16th congressional district, and partially overlaps the 35th and 37th districts of the New York State Senate.

== Recent election results ==
=== 2026 ===
2026 New York State Assembly election, District 90
Primary election
Party	Candidate	Votes	%
Democratic	Frank Jereis	2,826	57.1
Democratic	Jeanette Garcia	2,122	42.9
Write-in		0	0
Total votes		4,948	100.0
General election
Democratic	Frank Jereis		
Republican	John Isaac		
Write-in			
Total votes			100.0

=== 2024 ===
2024 New York State Assembly election, District 90
Party	Candidate	Votes	%
Democratic	Nader Sayegh (incumbent)	27,146	56.5
Republican	John Isaac	19,312	
Conservative	John Isaac	1,732	
Total	John Isaac	20,944	43.5
Write-in		17	0.0
Total votes		48,107	100.0
Democratic hold			

=== 2022 ===
2022 New York State Assembly election, District 90
Party	Candidate	Votes	%
Democratic	Nader Sayegh	16,934	
Fair Deal	Nader Sayegh	294	
Total	Nader Sayegh (incumbent)	17,228	52.8
Republican	Michael Breen	14,152	
Conservative	Michael Breen	1,270	
Total	Michael Breen	15,422	47.2
Write-in		14	0.0
Total votes		32,664	100.0
Democratic hold			

=== 2020 ===
2020 New York State Assembly election, District 90
Party	Candidate	Votes	%
Democratic	Nader Sayegh	32,199	
Independence	Nader Sayegh	2,639	
Total	Nader Sayegh (incumbent)	34,838	99.5
Write-in		158	0.5
Total votes		34,996	100.0
Democratic hold			

=== 2018 ===
2018 New York State Assembly election, District 90
Primary election
Party	Candidate	Votes	%
Working Families	Nader Sayegh	21	100.0
Write-in		0	0.0
Total votes		21	100
Green	Nader Sayegh	16	100.0
Write-in		0	0.0
Total votes		16	100
Women's Equality	Nader Sayegh	9	75.0
Women's Equality	Anthony Nicodemo	3	25.0
Write-in		0	0.0
Total votes		12	100
General election
Democratic	Nader Sayegh	22,276	
Working Families	Nader Sayegh	554	
Independence	Nader Sayegh	437	
Women's Equality	Nader Sayegh	227	
Green	Nader Sayegh	201	
Reform	Nader Sayegh	58	
Total	Nader Sayegh	23,753	65.3
Republican	Joe Pinion	10,772	
Conservative	Joe Pinion	1,860	
Total	Joe Pinion	12,632	34.7
Write-in		24	0.0
Total votes		36,387	100.0
Democratic hold			

=== 2016 ===
2016 New York State Assembly election, District 90
Party	Candidate	Votes	%
Democratic	Shelley Mayer	28,737	
Working Families	Shelley Mayer	2,054	
Independence	Shelley Mayer	1,417	
Total	Shelley Mayer (incumbent)	32,208	99.5
Write-in		170	0.5
Total votes		32,378	100.0
Democratic hold			

=== 2014 ===
2014 New York State Assembly election, District 90
Primary election
Party	Candidate	Votes	%
Democratic	Shelley Mayer (incumbent)	2,705	79.7
Democratic	Michael Sweeney	690	20.3
Write-in		0	0.0
Total votes		3,395	100
General election
Democratic	Shelley Mayer	12,965	
Working Families	Shelley Mayer	1,603	
Independence	Shelley Mayer	1,052	
Total	Shelley Mayer (incumbent)	15,620	98.9
Write-in		179	1.1
Total votes		15,799	100.0
Democratic hold			

=== 2012 ===
2012 New York State Assembly election, District 90
Party	Candidate	Votes	%
Democratic	Shelley Mayer	25,076	
Working Families	Shelley Mayer	1,910	
Independence	Shelley Mayer	1,662	
Total	Shelley Mayer	28,648	99.8
Write-in		123	0.2
Total votes		28,711	100.0
Democratic hold			
