= Joe Pinion =

American politician and former television host (born 1983)

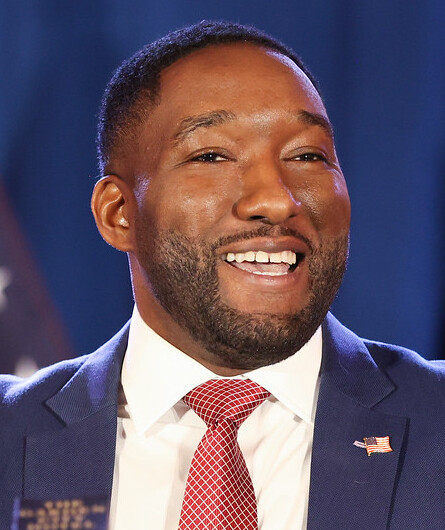
- Pinion in 2022

Personal details
- Born: Joseph Pinion III; August 11, 1983 (age 43) Yonkers, New York, U.S.
- Party: Republican
- Education: Colgate University (BA)

Joseph Pinion III (born August 11, 1983) is an American former television host, businessman, and activist. A member of the Republican Party, he was the nominee of the Republican and Conservative parties in the 2022 United States Senate election in New York, making him the first African American to receive a major party's backing for the U.S. Senate in the state of New York.

== Early life and education ==
Pinion was born on August 11, 1983, in Yonkers. He attended Colgate University on an athletic grant, playing football. He graduated in 2006 with a Bachelor's Degree in English.

== Career ==
Pinion started his career as a youth development director at a Bronx health center, where he worked for several years before becoming a political commentator, where he appeared on news networks such as CNN. Later, Pinion became the host of "Saturday Agenda" on Newsmax. He is also a climate change activist and has criticized climate change deniers within the GOP. He has worked with the organization RepublicEn, a right-leaning environmentalist advocacy organization, since 2017.

== Politics ==
Prior to running for office, Pinion served as the Chair of the Conservative Color Coalition and was the Outreach Director for the New York Young Republican Federation.

In 2018, Pinion announced his candidacy for New York's 90th assembly district, which was vacated after Shelley Mayer won an open seat to the state senate. He received the Republican and Conservative party nominations, but lost the election to Nader Sayegh.

In 2022, on Martin Luther King Jr. Day, Pinion announced that he was running for the United States Senate in a video highlighting Martin Luther King Jr. At the Republican convention in Nassau County, he received the party designation.

He unsuccessfully challenged Democratic incumbent Chuck Schumer, the Senate Majority Leader, in the general election. Pinion ultimately received 2.5 million votes statewide, winning 42.8% of the vote to Schumer's 56.8%. Despite a large funding disparity (Pinion spent only $500,000 on campaign advertising, against Schumer's $38 million), Pinion performed better than any Republican candidate has in a New York U.S. Senate race since Rick Lazio in 2000, and lost to Schumer by a narrower margin than any Republican candidate has since Schumer beat Senator Al D'Amato in 1998. Pinion's performance was part of a "red wave" in the 2022 New York state elections, which saw an overperformance for Republicans in statewide and Congressional races.

== See also ==
- List of African-American United States Senate candidates

Party political offices
Preceded by Wendy Long	Republican nominee for U.S. Senator from New York (Class 3); 2022	Most recent
