= New York's 95th State Assembly district =

American legislative district

Assemblymember
Dana Levenberg; D–Ossining

New York's 95th State Assembly district is one of the 150 districts in the New York State Assembly. It has been represented by Dana Levenberg since 2023, succeeding Sandy Galef.

== Geography ==
=== 2020s ===
District 95 contains portions of Westchester and Putnam counties. It includes the towns of Cortlandt, Croton-on-Hudson, Ossining, Peekskill, Buchanan, Philipstown, Cold Spring and a majority of Briarcliff Manor. The now decommissioned Indian Point nuclear power facility lies within the district.

The district is entirely within New York's 17th congressional district, and overlaps the 39th and 40th districts of the New York State Senate.

=== 2010s ===
District 95 contains portions of Westchester and Putnam counties. It includes the towns of Cortlandt, Croton-on-Hudson, Ossining, Peekskill, Philipstown, Cold Spring, and Kent.

== Recent election results ==
=== 2026 ===
2026 New York State Assembly election, District 95
Party	Candidate	Votes	%
Democratic	Dana Levenberg		
Working Families	Dana Levenberg		
Total	Dana Levenberg (incumbent)		
Republican	Laurie Ryan		
Conservative	Laurie Ryan		
Total	Laurie Ryan		
Write-in			
Total votes			

=== 2024 ===
2024 New York State Assembly election, District 95
Party	Candidate	Votes	%
Democratic	Dana Levenberg	36,042	
Working Families	Dana Levenberg	2,430	
Total	Dana Levenberg (incumbent)	38,472	63.8
Republican	Michael Capalbo	19,682	
Conservative	Michael Capalbo	2,126	
Total	Michael Capalbo	21,808	36.2
Write-in		29	0.0
Total votes		60,309	100.0
Democratic hold			

=== 2022 ===
2022 New York State Assembly election, District 95
Primary election
Party	Candidate	Votes	%
Democratic	Dana Levenberg	4,443	46.9
Democratic	Vanessa Agudelo	3,158	33.4
Democratic	Colin Smith	1,858	19.6
Write-in		5	0.1
Total votes		9,464	100.0
General election
Democratic	Dana Levenberg	26,101	
Working Families	Dana Levenberg	2,394	
Total	Dana Levenberg	28,495	62.4
Republican	Stacy Halper	15,447	
Conservative	Stacy Halper	1,703	
Total	Stacy Halper	17,150	37.6
Write-in		11	0.0
Total votes		45,656	100.0
Democratic hold			

=== 2020 ===
2020 New York State Assembly election, District 95
Party	Candidate	Votes	%
Democratic	Sandy Galef	39,235	66.0
Republican	Lawrence Chiulli	17,968	
Conservative	Lawrence Chiulli	2,269	
Total	Lawrence Chiulli	20,237	34.0
Write-in		20	0.0
Total votes		59,492	100.0
Democratic hold			

=== 2018 ===
2018 New York State Assembly election, District 95
Party	Candidate	Votes	%
Democratic	Sandy Galef	29,299	
Working Families	Sandy Galef	1,398	
Women's Equality	Sandy Galef	528	
Reform	Sandy Galef	159	
Total	Sandy Galef	31,384	68.4
Republican	Lawrence Chiulli	12,406	
Conservative	Lawrence Chiulli	2,089	
Total	Lawrence Chiulli	14,495	31.6
Write-in		12	0.0
Total votes		45,891	100.0
Democratic hold			

=== 2016 ===
2016 New York State Assembly election, District 95
Party	Candidate	Votes	%
Democratic	Sandy Galef	32,062	
Working Families	Sandy Galef	1,829	
Independence	Sandy Galef	1,029	
Women's Equality	Sandy Galef	457	
Total	Sandy Galef	35,377	68.3
Republican	Gregory Purdy	16,055	
Reform	Gregory Purdy	333	
Total	Gregory Purdy	16,388	31.6
Write-in		30	0.1
Total votes		51,795	100.0
Democratic hold			

=== 2014 ===
2014 New York State Assembly election, District 95
Party	Candidate	Votes	%
Democratic	Sandy Galef	18,304	
Working Families	Sandy Galef	2,741	
Independence	Sandy Galef	2,128	
Total	Sandy Galef	23,173	99.1
Write-in		209	0.9
Total votes		23,382	100.0
Democratic hold			

=== 2012 ===
2012 New York State Assembly election, District 95
Party	Candidate	Votes	%
Democratic	Sandy Galef	30,673	
Independence	Sandy Galef	1,946	
Total	Sandy Galef	32,619	68.6
Republican	Kim Izzarelli	12,620	
Conservative	Kim Izzarelli	2,293	
Total	Kim Izzarelli	14,913	31.4
Write-in		24	0.0
Total votes		47,556	100.0
Democratic hold			
