= Nader Sayegh =

American politician

Nader J. Sayegh
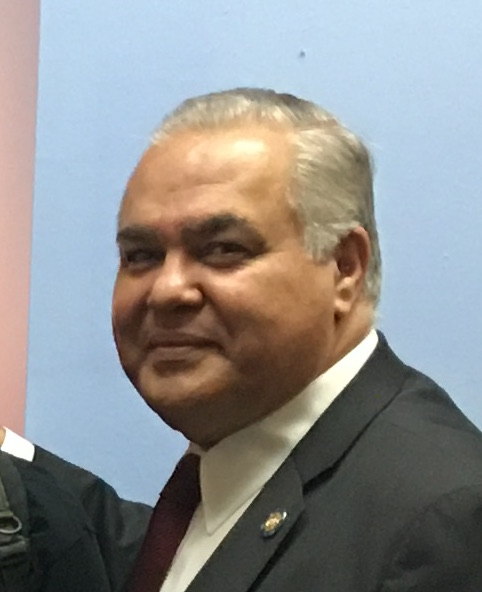
- Sayegh in 2020

Member of the New York State Assembly from the 90th district
- In office January 9, 2019 – November 19, 2026
- Preceded by: Shelley Mayer
- Succeeded by: Frank Jereis

Personal details
- Born: August 30, 1952 (age 74) Mafraq, Jordan
- Party: Democratic
- Spouse: Sana
- Children: 5
- Education: Lehman College, B.A. Fairleigh Dickinson University, M.A. Fordham University, M.A. Pace University School of Law, J.D.
- Website: Official website

Nader J. Sayegh (Arabic: نادر صايغ born August 30, 1952) is a Jordanian-American politician, attorney, and educator from the state of New York. A Democrat, Sayegh represented the 90th district of the New York State Assembly, based in Yonkers, from 2019 to 2026.

== Early life and career ==
Sayegh was born on August 30, 1952, in Mafraq, Jordan to an Eastern Orthodox family. His mother, Jalilah Sayegh (1929-2020), was born in Mafraq and moved with his father Jamil M. Sayegh (died 1965) to the United States in 1957.

Sayegh was an educator with Yonkers Public Schools from 1973 until 2008, and worked as a school superintendent in 2010 and 2011. Sayegh is also an attorney at law and a captain in the New York Guard.

== New York State Assembly ==
=== 2018 State Assembly election ===
In 2018, Sayegh announced he would run for the Assembly seat vacated by Shelley Mayer, who had been elected to the State Senate in a special election. After winning the Democratic primary unopposed, Sayegh defeated Republican Joe Pinion in the general election with 65% of the vote.

=== Tenure ===
Sayegh was sworn in on January 9, 2019, and is the first Jordanian-American to ever serve in the Assembly.

In June 2019, following the 2019 outbreak of measles in New York, a bill to eliminate religious and philosophical exemptions for vaccinations became deadlocked in the Assembly Health Committee, 13–13. Though he personally opposed the bill, Sayegh switched his vote to allow the bill to come to the Assembly floor, saying that "this is a crucial issue that deserves to be put before the entire Assembly to be debated and decided upon." When the bill came up for a vote from the full Assembly, Sayegh voted against it; the bill passed, 84–61.

That October, Sayegh introduced a bill to establish an option for a special driver's license for people with autism, in order to prevent potentially dangerous misunderstandings during traffic stops or other interactions with law enforcement. Some advocates voiced concerns over the bill, given that some individuals on the autism spectrum may not want to reveal their status to employers. The bill was referred to the Transportation Committee and has yet to come up for a vote.

In 2019 and 2021, Sayegh co-sponsored legislation to make the National Day of the People's Republic of China a public holiday in the State of New York.

== Personal life ==
Sayegh lives in Yonkers with his wife, Sana. He has five adult daughters.
