= Shelley Mayer =

American politician

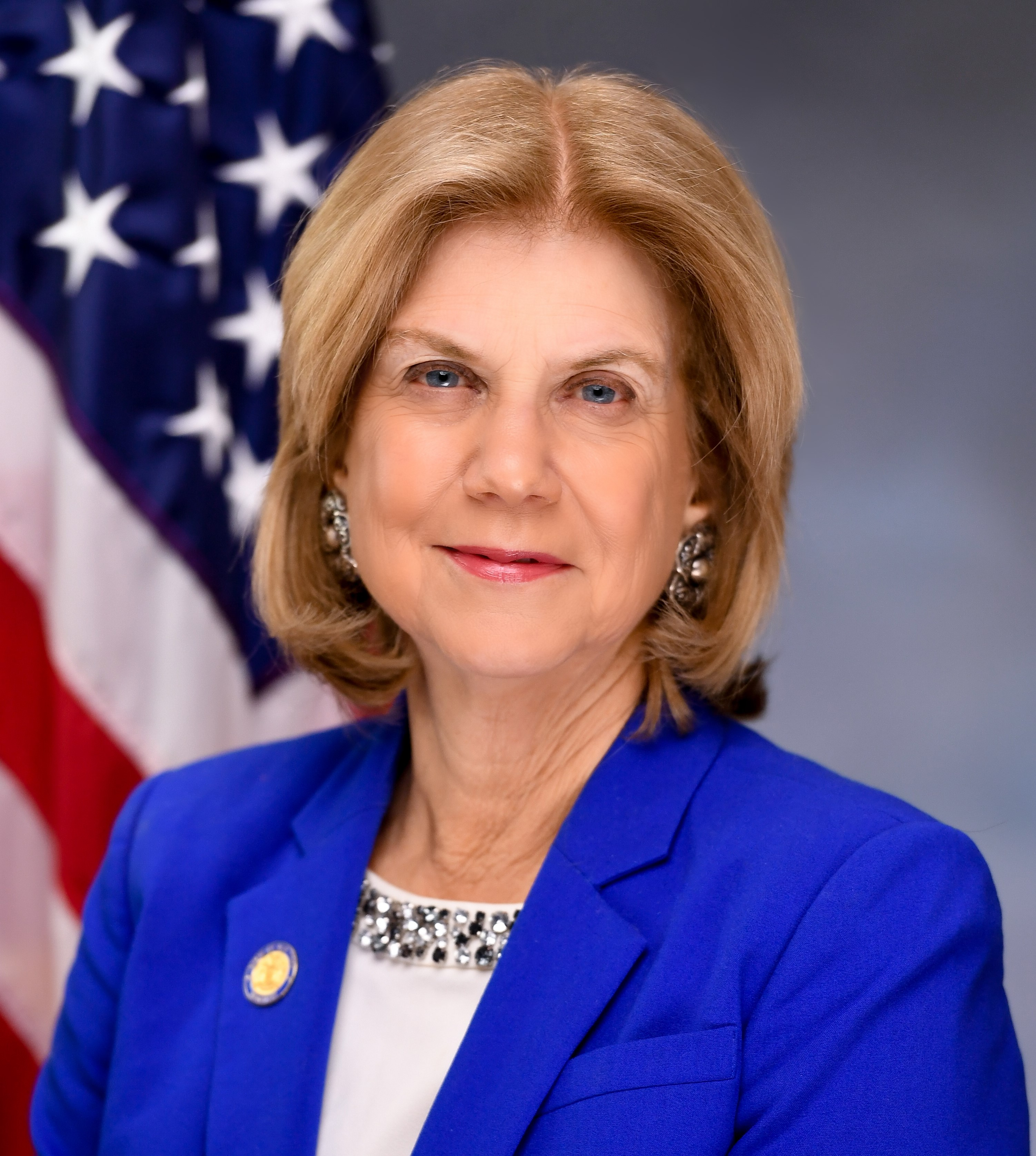
- Mayer in 2020

Member of the New York Senate from the 37th district
- Incumbent
- Assumed office April 30, 2018
- Preceded by: George Latimer

Member of the New York State Assembly
- In office March 21, 2012 – April 30, 2018
- Preceded by: Mike Spano
- Succeeded by: Nader Sayegh
- Constituency: 93rd district (2012); 90th district (2013-2018)

Personal details
- Born: March 6, 1953 (age 73) Yonkers, New York, U.S.
- Party: Democratic
- Spouse: Lee Smith
- Children: 3
- Education: University of California, Los Angeles (BA); SUNY Buffalo School of Law (JD)
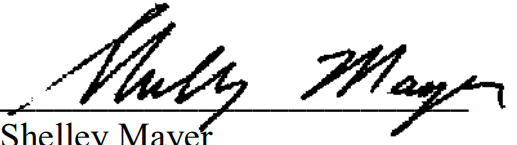
- Signature
- Website: Official website Campaign website

Shelley Mayer (born March 6, 1953) is an American politician serving as a Democratic member of the New York State Senate representing the 37th Senate District, which includes portions of Westchester County. Formerly a member of the New York State Assembly, Mayer was first elected in a special election in 2018 and re-elected in 2020, 2022, and 2024.

== Background ==
Mayer was born and raised in Yonkers. She received her B.A. at the University of California, Los Angeles in 1975 and later her J.D. at the University at Buffalo Law School in 1979

Prior to her election to public office, Mayer was a Senior Counsel at the National State Attorney General Program at Columbia University, where she focused on health care and labor law rights. From 2007 until early 2011, Shelley worked as Chief Counsel to the New York State Senate Conference in Albany.

For over seven years, she served as Vice President of Government and Community Affairs at Continuum Health Partners in New York City (previously St. Luke's-Roosevelt Hospital Center and Beth Israel Medical Center). From 1982 to 1994, Mayer served as an Assistant Attorney General in the office of New York Attorney General Bob Abrams.

In 2006, Mayer made her first run for public office, losing a bid for the New York State Assembly to incumbent Republican Mike Spano. Spano later went on to change parties, ran for Mayor of Yonkers in 2011 as a Democrat, and won.

Mayer was first elected to the New York State Assembly on March 20, 2012, in a special election to succeed Spano, and was re-elected three times.

== New York Senate ==
Mayer was elected to the State Senate to represent the 37th District in a special election held on April 24, 2018 after the office was vacated by Westchester County Executive George Latimer. She was subsequently re-elected in 2020, 2022, and 2024. Mayer appeared on the Democratic, Working Families, and Women's Equality Party lines and won by a margin of 62% to 48%. Mayer attributed her electoral victory to broad support from diverse political groups, including progressives, Democrats, labor unions, and women's advocacy organizations.

Later in 2018, despite the district being deemed competitive by pundits, Mayer was unopposed for a full-term. With Democrats retaking the majority, Mayer is serving as Chair of Committee on Education.

Since becoming Chair of the New York State Senate Committee on Education, Mayer has focused on policies related to funding and resources for public schools, including those serving students with disabilities. From 2013 to 2017, as Chair of the Assembly Education Subcommittee on Students with Special Needs, she supported increased state funding for Special Act schools and other institutions serving students with disabilities. Mayer supported reforms to the Annual Professional Performance Review (APPR) system, contributing to legislation that reduced the weight of standardized test scores in teacher evaluations.

Mayer lives in Yonkers with her husband, Lee Smith, with whom she has three adult children, Aaron, Julia, and Arthur Smith, and five grandchildren.

New York State Assembly
Preceded by Mike Spano	New York State Assembly, 93rd District; 2012–2013	Succeeded by David Buchwald
Preceded by Sandy Galef	New York State Assembly, 90th District; 2013–2018	Succeeded by Nader Sayegh
New York State Senate
Preceded by George Latimer	New York State Senate, 37th District; 2018–present	Incumbent
