= Annual professional performance review =

The Annual Professional Performance Review Plan (also known as an APPR) is the process by which New York state teachers and principals are evaluated on a yearly basis.

New York State Education Department requires that each of the 698 public-school entities around the state document, and requires that local board of education have a plan in place for reviewing the merits of each educator in the public school system.

== See also ==
- Race to the Top
- New York State Education Department
- List of school districts in New York
