= Dana Levenberg =

American politician

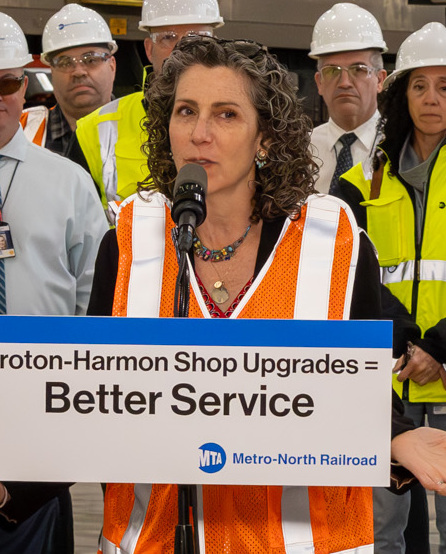

Member of the New York State Assembly from the 95th district
- Incumbent
- Assumed office January 1, 2023
- Preceded by: Sandy Galef

Town Supervisor of Ossining
- In office January 1, 2016 – December 31, 2022
- Succeeded by: Elizabeth Feldman

Personal details
- Party: Democratic
- Spouse: Stephen Hersh
- Children: 2
- Education: Brown University (BA)
- Website: Official website

Dana Ann Levenberg is an American politician who is a member of the New York State Assembly from the 95th district since 2023. First elected in 2022, she previously served as the Town Supervisor of Ossining.

== Career ==
Levenberg began her career working in advertising and TV production. Later, she served as Assemblywoman Sandy Galef's chief of staff and was elected to three terms on the Ossining School Board. Levenberg left Galef's office after being elected Town Supervisor of the Town of Ossining in 2015.

In 2022, Galef announced she would be retiring from the New York State Assembly at the end of the year, and Levenberg entered the race to succeed her. Galef quickly endorsed her. In the Democratic primary, Levenberg won in a 3-way race against former Peekskill Common Council member and democratic socialist Vanessa Agudelo as well as Westchester County Legislator Colin Smith. In the general election, Levenberg ran against Republican Stacy Halper, a retired music teacher from Briarcliff Manor.

== Personal life ==
Levenberg attended Teaneck High School and Brown University. She married Steven Joel Hersh in West Orange, New Jersey in 1993.

== Electoral history ==
=== Ossining Town Supervisor ===
2015 Ossining Town Supervisor General Election
| Party | Candidate | Votes | % |
|---|---|---|---|
| Democratic | Dana Levenberg | 2,324 | 54.00% |
| Working Families | Dana Levenberg | 184 | 4.28% |
| Independence | Dana Levenberg | 94 | 2.18% |
| Women's Equality | Dana Levenberg | 39 | 0.91% |
| Total | Dana Levenberg | 2,641 | 61.36% |
| Conservative | John Perillio | 1,509 | 35.06% |
| Reform | John Perillio | 150 | 3.49% |
| Total | John Perillio | 1,659 | 38.55% |
| Write-in | | 4 | 0.09% |
| Total votes | | 4,304 | 100% |
| Democratic hold | | | |

2017 Ossining Town Supervisor General Election
| Party | Candidate | Votes | % |
|---|---|---|---|
| Democratic | Dana Levenberg | 5,292 | 86.64% |
| Independence | Dana Levenberg | 409 | 6.67% |
| Working Families | Dana Levenberg | 396 | 6.46% |
| Total | Dana Levenberg (incumbent) | 6,097 | 99.49% |
| Write-in | | 31 | 0.51% |
| Total votes | | 6,128 | 100% |
| Democratic hold | | | |

2021 Ossining Town Supervisor Democratic Primary
| Party | Candidate | Votes | % |
|---|---|---|---|
| Democratic | Dana Levenberg (incumbent) | 931 | 59.26% |
| Democratic | Elizabeth Feldman | 640 | 40.74% |
| Total votes | | 1,462 | 100% |

2021 Ossining Town Supervisor General Election
| Party | Candidate | Votes | % |
|---|---|---|---|
| Democratic | Dana Levenberg (incumbent) | 3,808 | 100.00% |
| Total votes | | 3,808 | 100% |
| Democratic hold | | | |

=== New York Assembly ===
2022 New York State Assembly 95th district Democratic primary
| Party | Candidate | Votes | % |
|---|---|---|---|
| Democratic | Dana Levenberg | 4,443 | 46.95% |
| Democratic | Vanessa Agudelo | 3,158 | 33.37% |
| Democratic | Colin Smith | 1,858 | 19.63% |
| Write-in | | 5 | 0.05% |
| Total votes | | 9,464 | 100% |

2022 New York State Assembly 95th district general election
| Party | Candidate | Votes | % |
|---|---|---|---|
| Democratic | Dana Levenberg | 26,101 | 57.17% |
| Working Families | Dana Levenberg | 2,394 | 5.24% |
| Total | Dana Levenberg | 28,495 | 62.41% |
| Republican | Stacy Halper | 15,447 | 33.83% |
| Conservative | Stacy Halper | 1,703 | 3.73% |
| Total | Stacy Halper | 17,150 | 37.56% |
| Write-in | | 11 | 0.02% |
| Total votes | | 45,656 | 100% |
| Democratic hold | | | |

2024 New York State Assembly 95th district general election
| Party | Candidate | Votes | % |
|---|---|---|---|
| Democratic | Dana Levenberg | 32,344 | 53.63% |
| Working Families | Dana Levenberg | 2,430 | 4.03% |
| Total | Dana Levenberg (incumbent) | 38,472 | 63.79% |
| Republican | Michael L. Capalbo | 19,682 | 32.64% |
| Conservative | Michael L. Capalbo | 2,126 | 3.53% |
| Total | Michael L. Capalbo | 21,808 | 36.16% |
| Write-in | | 29 | 0.05% |
| Total votes | | 60,309 | 100% |
| Democratic hold | | | |

Political offices
| Preceded by Sandy Galef | New York Assembly, 95th District; 2023–present | Incumbent |
