= Civil Service Employees Association =

CSEA
- Civil Service Employees Association
- Founded: October 24, 1910
- Headquarters: Albany, NY
- Location: United States
- Members: 300,000+
- Key people: Mary E. Sullivan, President
- Affiliations: AFSCME, AFL–CIO
- Website: www.cseany.org

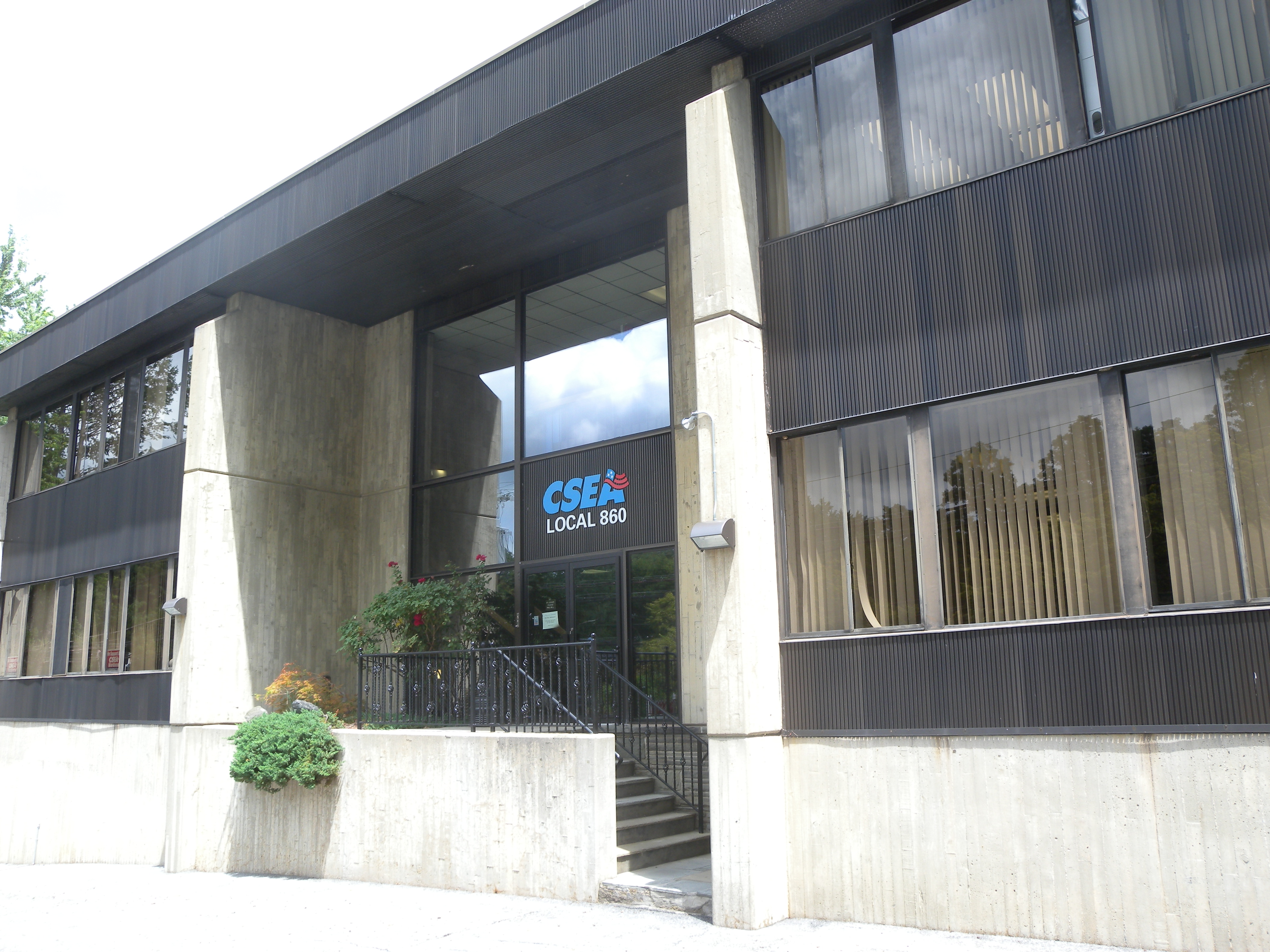
Local 860

The Civil Service Employees Association (CSEA) is a labor union in the state of New York that represents employees in state and local government, as well as school districts, child care, and the private sector. As of 2010, there were about 300,000 members in the union. CSEA is the largest constituent unit in American Federation of State, County and Municipal Employees.

== History ==
Founded by civil service workers for the State of New York as the Association of State Civil Service Employees on Oct. 24, 1910, the CSEA (as it was renamed in 1946) affiliated with AFSCME in 1978.

== Governance ==
CSEA is governed by its members, who meet in an annual convention. Each local elects delegates, based on proportional representation. The delegates debate and approve policy, and set dues.

The union President, Vice President, Treasurer, Secretary are all elected by a vote of the entire CSEA membership by mail-in ballot. Region presidents are elected by a vote of all region members.

=== Statewide officers ===
Current statewide officers are:

- President: Mary E. Sullivan (2019–present)
- Executive Vice President: Vacant
- Secretary: Richard Bebo (2020–present)
- Treasurer: Nicole Meeks (2020–present)

=== Region officers ===
Current region officers are:

- Region 1 - Jarvis Brown
- Region 2 - Lester Crockett
- Region 3 - Anthony Adamo
- Region 4 - Shana Davis
- Region 5 - Ken Greenleaf
- Region 6 - Steve Healy

=== Annual convention ===
Every fall, CSEA is required by its constitution to have a convention that draws nearly 1,000 delegates.

== Local structure ==
CSEA is made up of six geographic regions: Long Island, New York City, Southern, Capital, Central, and Western. Within these regions are more than 375 locals and more than 1,000 units.

Locals have an important role to build the union, protect and improve terms and conditions of employment of the membership and protect individual rights. Each local elects a president, at least one vice president, a secretary and a treasurer. The Local president is ultimately responsible for everything that goes on in that local. In CSEA's State and Private Sector Divisions, locals assist individual members with grievances, notices of discipline, collective bargaining and so forth. In CSEA's Local Government Division these activities are often conducted at the Unit level.

Units are subdivisions of the locals of which they are a member, and have the same basic structure as locals; a president, one or more vice presidents, a secretary and a treasurer. The Unit president is ultimately responsible for everything which transpires in the unit, and is directly responsible to the local. The unit has the same basic responsibilities as the local: to build the union, to protect and improve the terms and conditions of employment of its membership and to protect the rights of individual unit members. In practice, this means that the unit negotiates and polices the collective bargaining agreement, assists members who have possible contract grievances or who have received notices of discipline, and communicates both with its own membership and with the local of which it is a member.
