= New York's 37th State Senate district =

American legislative district

Senator
Shelley Mayer; D–Yonkers
- Registration: 42.5% Democratic; 26.2% Republican; 25.% No party preference
- Demographics: 64% White; 6% Black; 22% Hispanic; 6% Asian
- Population (2017): 321,457
- Registered voters: 209,798

New York's 37th State Senate district is one of 63 districts in the New York State Senate. It has been represented by Democrat Shelley Mayer since 2018, following her victory in a competitive special election to succeed fellow Democrat George Latimer, who had recently been elected Westchester County Executive.

== Geography ==
District 37 covers a swath of Westchester County in the suburbs of New York City, including some or all of Bedford, Eastchester, Harrison, Larchmont, Mamaroneck, New Rochelle, North Castle, Port Chester, Rye, Rye Brook, White Plains, and Yonkers.

The district overlaps New York's 16th, 17th, and 18th congressional districts, and with the 88th, 89th, 90th, 91st, and 93rd districts of the New York State Assembly.

== Recent election results ==
=== 2026 ===
2026 New York State Senate election, District 37
Party	Candidate	Votes	%
Democratic	Shelley Mayer		
Working Families	Shelley Mayer		
Total	Shelley Mayer (incumbent)		
Republican	Thomas Fix Jr.		
Conservative	Thomas Fix Jr.		
Total	Thomas Fix Jr.		
Write-in			
Total votes			

=== 2024 ===
2024 New York State Senate election, District 37
Party	Candidate	Votes	%
Democratic	Shelley Mayer	87,008	
Working Families	Shelley Mayer	3,873	
Total	Shelley Mayer (incumbent)	90,881	61.7
Republican	Tricia Lindsay	52,077	
Conservative	Tricia Lindsay	4,207	
Total	Tricia Lindsay	56,284	38.2
Write-in		59	0.1
Total votes		147,224	100.0
Democratic hold			

=== 2022 ===
2022 New York State Senate election, District 37
Party	Candidate	Votes	%
Democratic	Shelley Mayer	63,913	
Working Families	Shelley Mayer	3,217	
Total	Shelley Mayer (incumbent)	67,130	61.1
Republican	Frank Murtha	42,767	38.9
Write-in		30	0.0
Total votes		109,927	100.0
Democratic hold			

=== 2020 ===
2020 New York State Senate election, District 37
Party	Candidate	Votes	%
Democratic	Shelley Mayer	84,087	
Working Families	Shelley Mayer	5,831	
SAM	Shelley Mayer	228	
Total	Shelley Mayer (incumbent)	90,146	62.5
Republican	Liviu Saimovici	47,890	
Conservative	Liviu Saimovici	6,146	
Total	Liviu Saimovici	54,026	37.5
Write-in		39	0.0
Total votes		144,221	100.0
Democratic hold			

=== 2018 ===
2018 New York State Senate election, District 37
Party	Candidate	Votes	%
Democratic	Shelley Mayer	70,011	
Women's Equality	Shelley Mayer	4,967	
Working Families	Shelley Mayer	1,688	
Independence	Shelley Mayer	1,516	
Total	Shelley Mayer (incumbent)	78,182	99.4
Write-in		682	0.6
Total votes		78,864	100.0
Democratic hold			

=== 2018 special ===
2018 New York State Senate special election, District 37
Party	Candidate	Votes	%
Democratic	Shelley Mayer	26,829	
Working Families	Shelley Mayer	1,066	
Women's Equality	Shelley Mayer	463	
Total	Shelley Mayer	28,358	57.6
Republican	Julie Killian	17,600	
Conservative	Julie Killian	2,872	
Reform	Julie Killian	404	
Total	Julie Killian	20,876	42.4
Write-in		28	0.0
Total votes		49,262	100.0
Democratic hold			

=== 2016 ===
2016 New York State Senate election, District 37
Party	Candidate	Votes	%
Democratic	George Latimer	69,420	
Working Families	George Latimer	2,815	
Women's Equality	George Latimer	881	
Total	George Latimer (incumbent)	73,116	55.7
Republican	Julie Killian	50,713	
Conservative	Julie Killian	5,216	
Independence	Julie Killian	1,809	
Reform	Julie Killian	426	
Total	Julie Killian	58,164	44.2
Write-in		119	0.1
Total votes		131,399	100.0
Democratic hold			

=== 2014 ===
2014 New York State Senate election, District 37
Party	Candidate	Votes	%
Democratic	George Latimer	34,850	
Working Families	George Latimer	3,242	
Total	George Latimer (incumbent)	38,092	52.2
Republican	Joseph Dillon	29,151	
Conservative	Joseph Dillon	4,572	
Independence	Joseph Dillon	1,190	
Total	Joseph Dillon	34,913	47.8
Write-in		28	0.0
Total votes		73,005	100.0
Democratic hold			

=== 2012 ===
2012 New York State Senate election, District 37
Party	Candidate	Votes	%
Democratic	George Latimer	61,010	
Working Families	George Latimer	3,226	
Total	George Latimer	64,236	54.1
Republican	Bob Cohen	48,125	
Conservative	Bob Cohen	4,522	
Independence	Bob Cohen	1,927	
Total	Bob Cohen	54,574	45.9
Write-in		40	0.0
Total votes		118,850	100.0
Democratic hold			

=== Federal results in District 37 ===
Year	Office	Results
2020	President	Biden 62.0 – 36.7%
2016	President	Clinton 59.3 – 37.5%
2012	President	Obama 54.0 – 45.0%
2012	Senate	Gillibrand 64.8 – 33.8%
