= 2024 New York State Senate election =

- November 5, 2024

All 63 seats in the New York State Senate 32 seats needed for a majority
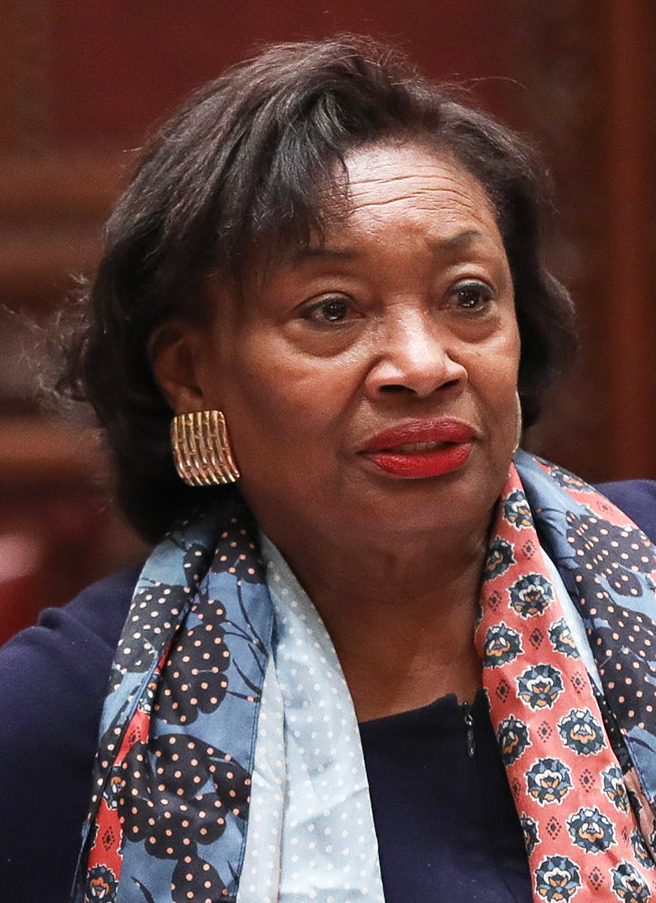

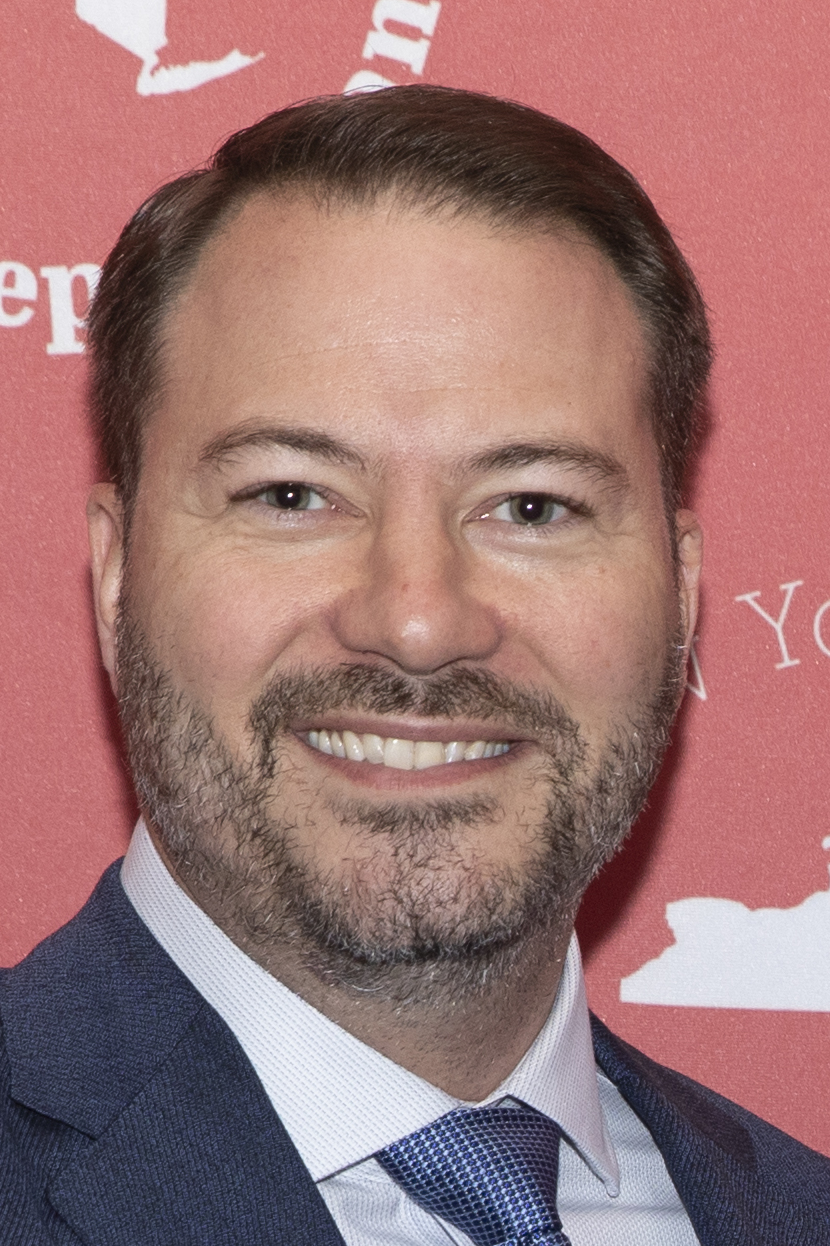
	Majority party	Minority party
Leader	Andrea Stewart-Cousins	Rob Ortt
Party	Democratic	Republican
Leader's seat	35th district	62nd district
Last election	42	21
Seats won	41	22
Seat change	▼1	▲1
Popular vote	3,770,406	2,985,013
Percentage	50.79%	40.21%
Swing	▲2.13%	▼0.65%
- Republican gain Democratic hold Republican hold 50–60% 60–70% 70–80% 80–90% >90% 50–60% 60–70% 70–80% >90%
Temporary President and Majority Leader before election
Andrea Stewart-Cousins
Democratic
Elected Temporary President and Majority Leader
Andrea Stewart-Cousins
Democratic

The 2024 New York State Senate election was held on November 5, 2024. Primary elections were held on June 25, 2024. In this election, the Democratic Party retained its State Senate majority, but lost its veto-proof (two-thirds) majority after it lost one seat in the election for the 17th Senate district.

== Outgoing incumbents ==
1. 6th district: Democrat Kevin Thomas did not seek re-election.
2. 46th district: Democrat Neil Breslin did not seek re-election.
3. 50th district: Democrat John Mannion did not seek re-election; instead, he ran for the U.S. House of Representatives.

=== Incumbents who vacated office before end of term ===
1. 63rd district: Democrat Tim Kennedy resigned on May 6, 2024 after being elected to the United States House of Representatives.

== Predictions ==
Source	Ranking	As of
Sabato's Crystal Ball	Safe D	October 23, 2024

== Results ==
=== Election ===
2024 New York State Senate election General election — November 5, 2024
New York State Senate 2022
Party	Votes	Percentage	Seats	+/–
Democratic	3,770,406	50.79	41	▼1
Republican	2,985,013	40.21	22	▲1
Conservative	403,495	5.44	0	Steady
Working Families	237,758	3.20	0	Steady
Local 607	2,068	0.03	0	Steady
Common Sense	1,372	0.02	0	Steady
Scattering	23,199	0.31	0	Steady
Valid votes	7,423,311	88.83	63	—
Blank votes	911,191	10.90	—	—
Void votes	22,134	0.26	—	—
Totals	8,356,636	100	63	—

== Summary by district ==
† = incumbent who did not seek re-election
Italics = non-incumbent
Bold = district flipped from one party to the other

District	Incumbent	Party	Elected Senator	Party
1st	Anthony Palumbo	Rep	Anthony Palumbo	Rep
2nd	Mario Mattera	Rep	Mario Mattera	Rep
3rd	Dean Murray	Rep	Dean Murray	Rep
4th	Monica Martinez	Dem	Monica Martinez	Dem
5th	Steven Rhoads	Rep	Steven Rhoads	Rep
6th	Kevin Thomas†	Dem	Siela Bynoe	Dem
7th	Jack Martins	Rep	Jack Martins	Rep
8th	Alexis Weik	Rep	Alexis Weik	Rep
9th	Patricia Canzoneri-Fitzpatrick	Rep	Patricia Canzoneri-Fitzpatrick	Rep
10th	James Sanders Jr.	Dem	James Sanders Jr.	Dem
11th	Toby Ann Stavisky	Dem	Toby Ann Stavisky	Dem
12th	Michael Gianaris	Dem	Michael Gianaris	Dem
13th	Jessica Ramos	Dem	Jessica Ramos	Dem
14th	Leroy Comrie	Dem	Leroy Comrie	Dem
15th	Joseph Addabbo Jr.	Dem	Joseph Addabbo Jr.	Dem
16th	John Liu	Dem	John Liu	Dem
17th	Iwen Chu	Dem	**Steve Chan**	**Rep**
18th	Julia Salazar	Dem	Julia Salazar	Dem
19th	Roxanne Persaud	Dem	Roxanne Persaud	Dem
20th	Zellnor Myrie	Dem	Zellnor Myrie	Dem
21st	Kevin Parker	Dem	Kevin Parker	Dem
22nd	Simcha Felder	Dem	Simcha Felder	Dem
23rd	Jessica Scarcella-Spanton	Dem	Jessica Scarcella-Spanton	Dem
24th	Andrew Lanza	Rep	Andrew Lanza	Rep
25th	Jabari Brisport	Dem	Jabari Brisport	Dem
26th	Andrew Gounardes	Dem	Andrew Gounardes	Dem
27th	Brian P. Kavanagh	Dem	Brian P. Kavanagh	Dem
28th	Liz Krueger	Dem	Liz Krueger	Dem
29th	José M. Serrano	Dem	José M. Serrano	Dem
30th	Cordell Cleare	Dem	Cordell Cleare	Dem
31st	Robert Jackson	Dem	Robert Jackson	Dem
32nd	Luis R. Sepulveda	Dem	Luis R. Sepulveda	Dem
33rd	Gustavo Rivera	Dem	Gustavo Rivera	Dem
34th	Nathalia Fernandez	Dem	Nathalia Fernandez	Dem
35th	Andrea Stewart-Cousins	Dem	Andrea Stewart-Cousins	Dem
36th	Jamaal Bailey	Dem	Jamaal Bailey	Dem
37th	Shelley Mayer	Dem	Shelley Mayer	Dem
38th	Bill Weber	Rep	Bill Weber	Rep
39th	Robert Rolison	Rep	Robert Rolison	Rep
40th	Peter Harckham	Dem	Peter Harckham	Dem
41st	Michelle Hinchey	Dem	Michelle Hinchey	Dem
42nd	James Skoufis	Dem	James Skoufis	Dem
43rd	Jake Ashby	Rep	Jake Ashby	Rep
44th	Jim Tedisco	Rep	Jim Tedisco	Rep
45th	Dan Stec	Rep	Dan Stec	Rep
46th	Neil Breslin†	Dem	Pat Fahy	Dem
47th	Brad Hoylman-Sigal	Dem	Brad Hoylman-Sigal	Dem
48th	Rachel May	Dem	Rachel May	Dem
49th	Mark Walczyk	Rep	Mark Walczyk	Rep
50th	John Mannion†	Dem	Chris Ryan	Dem
51st	Peter Oberacker	Rep	Peter Oberacker	Rep
52nd	Lea Webb	Dem	Lea Webb	Dem
53rd	Joseph Griffo	Rep	Joseph Griffo	Rep
54th	Pam Helming	Rep	Pam Helming	Rep
55th	Samra Brouk	Dem	Samra Brouk	Dem
56th	Jeremy Cooney	Dem	Jeremy Cooney	Dem
57th	George Borrello	Rep	George Borrello	Rep
58th	Tom O'Mara	Rep	Tom O'Mara	Rep
59th	Kristen Gonzalez	Dem	Kristen Gonzalez	Dem
60th	Patrick Gallivan	Rep	Patrick Gallivan	Rep
61st	Sean Ryan	Dem	Sean Ryan	Dem
62nd	Rob Ortt	Rep	Rob Ortt	Rep
63rd	Vacant (Note: Tim Kennedy resigned May 6, 2024, after being elected to the United States House of Representatives.)		April Baskin	Dem

== Detailed results ==
Certified primary results:
Candidate list:

=== District 1 ===
==== Results ====
Incumbent Republican Senator Anthony Palumbo won re-election to a third term.

New York's 1st State Senate district, 2024
Party	Candidate	Votes	%
Republican	Anthony Palumbo (incumbent)	77,459	46.81%
Conservative	Anthony Palumbo (incumbent)	10,132	6.12%
Total	Anthony Palumbo (incumbent)	87,591	52.93%
Democratic	Sarah Anker	76,874	46.45%
Common Sense Party	Sarah Anker	979	0.59%
Total	Sarah Anker	77,853	47.04%
Write-in		49	0.03%
Total votes		165,493	100.00%

=== District 2 ===
==== Results ====
Incumbent Republican Senator Mario Mattera won re-election to a third term.

New York's 2nd State Senate district, 2024
Party	Candidate	Votes	%
Republican	Mario Mattera (incumbent)	92,270	51.75%
Conservative	Mario Mattera (incumbent)	11,595	6.50%
Total	Mario Mattera (incumbent)	103,865	58.25%
Democratic	Craig Herskowitz	74,307	41.68%
Write-in		123	0.07%
Total votes		178,295	100.00%

=== District 3 ===
==== Results ====
Incumbent Republican Senator Dean Murray won re-election to a second term.

New York's 3rd State Senate district, 2024
Party	Candidate	Votes	%
Republican	Dean Murray (incumbent)	78,923	54.36%
Conservative	Dean Murray (incumbent)	10,345	7.13%
Total	Dean Murray (incumbent)	89,268	61.47%
Democratic	Michael Conroy	55,904	38.49%
Write-in		56	0.04%
Total votes		145,228	100.00%

=== District 4 ===
==== Results ====
Incumbent Democratic Senator Monica Martinez won re-election to a second term. Martinez previously served one term representing the third district from 2019 to 2021, but lost re-election to a second term to Republican Alexis Weik. She ran in the new fourth district in 2022 following redistricting and won.

New York's 4th State Senate district, 2024
Party	Candidate	Votes	%
Democratic	Monica Martinez (incumbent)	58,688	53.43%
Working Families	Monica Martinez (incumbent)	3,328	3.03%
Total	Monica Martinez (incumbent)	62,016	56.46%
Republican	Teresa Bryant	42,538	38.73%
Conservative	Teresa Bryant	5,207	4.74%
Total	Teresa Bryant	47,745	43.47%
Write-in		72	0.07%
Total votes		109,833	100.00%

=== District 5 ===
==== Results ====
Incumbent Republican Senator Steven Rhoads won re-election to a second term.

New York's 5th State Senate district, 2024
Party	Candidate	Votes	%
Republican	Steven Rhoads (incumbent)	98,005	56.50%
Conservative	Steven Rhoads (incumbent)	8,240	4.75%
Total	Steven Rhoads (incumbent)	106,245	61.25%
Democratic	Lisa Lin	66,977	38.62%
Write-in		222	0.13%
Total votes		173,444	100.00%

=== District 6 ===
Democratic incumbent Kevin Thomas decided not to seek re-election and announced his candidacy for the 4th congressional district in the upcoming House of Representatives elections, although he chose not to run in the end and endorsed Laura Gillen instead. The seat was eventually held by Siela Bynoe who defeated Republican Thomas Montefinise.

==== Democratic primary ====
2024 New York State Senate District 6 Democratic primary
Party	Candidate	Votes	%
Democratic	Siela Bynoe	6,584	53.83%
Democratic	Taylor Darling	5,593	45.73%
Write-in		53	0.43%
Total votes		12,230	100.00%

==== General election ====
New York's 6th State Senate district, 2024
Party	Candidate	Votes	%
Democratic	Siela Bynoe	78,937	60.83%
Republican	Thomas Montefinise	46,276	35.66%
Conservative	Thomas Montefinise	4,437	3.42%
Total	Thomas Montefinise	50,713	39.08%
Write-in		117	0.09%
Total votes		129,767	100.00%
Democratic hold			

=== District 7 ===
==== Democratic primary ====
2024 New York State Senate District 7 Democratic primary
Party	Candidate	Votes	%
Democratic	Kim Keiserman	7,143	75.06%
Democratic	Brad Schwartz	2,314	24.32%
Write-in		59	0.62%
Total votes		9,516	100.00%

==== General election ====
Incumbent Republican Senator Jack Martins won re-election to a second term. Martins previously served three terms from 2011 to 2017.

New York's 7th State Senate district, 2024
Party	Candidate	Votes	%
Republican	Jack Martins (incumbent)	82,154	51.28%
Conservative	Jack Martins (incumbent)	6,099	3.81%
Total	Jack Martins (incumbent)	88,253	55.09%
Democratic	Kim Keiserman	71,700	44.76%
Write-in		251	0.15%
Total votes		160,204	100.00%

=== District 8 ===
==== Results ====
New York's 8th State Senate district, 2024
Party	Candidate	Votes	%
Republican	Alexis Weik	105,939	60.02%
Conservative	Alexis Weik	12,664	7.18%
Total	Alexis Weik (incumbent)	118,603	67.20%
Democratic	Francis Dolan	57,826	32.77%
Write-in		58	0.03%
Total votes		176,487	100.00

=== District 9 ===
==== Results ====
New York's 9th State Senate district, 2024
Party	Candidate	Votes	%
Republican	Patricia Canzoneri-Fitzpatrick	77,628	50.20%
Conservative	Patricia Canzoneri-Fitzpatrick	6,270	4.05%
Total	Patricia Canzoneri-Fitzpatrick (incumbent)	83,898	54.25%
Democratic	James Lynch	70,405	45.53%
Write-in		334	0.22%
Total votes		154,637	100.00%

=== District 10 ===
==== Results ====
New York's 10th State Senate district, 2024
Party	Candidate	Votes	%
Democratic	James Sanders Jr.	65,391	68.19%
Working Families	James Sanders Jr.	2,683	2.80%
Total	James Sanders Jr. (incumbent)	68,074	70.99%
Republican	Michael O'Reilly	25,129	26.21%
Conservative	Michael O'Reilly	2,151	2.24%
Common Sense Party	Michael O'Reilly	393	0.41%
Total	Michael O'Reilly	27,673	28.86%
Write-in		144	0.15%
Total votes		95,891	100.00%

=== District 11 ===
==== Results ====
New York's 11th State Senate district, 2024
Party	Candidate	Votes	%
Democratic	Toby Ann Stavisky	52,998	51.00%
Working Families	Toby Ann Stavisky	3,265	3.15%
Total	Toby Ann Stavisky (incumbent)	56,263	54.15%
Republican	Yiatin Chu	43,525	41.89%
Conservative	Yiatin Chu	3,683	3.54%
Total	Yiatin Chu	47,208	45.43%
Write-in		439	0.42%
Total votes		103,910	100.00%

=== District 12 ===
==== Results ====
New York's 12th State Senate district, 2024
Party	Candidate	Votes	%
Democratic	Michael Gianaris	48,820	55.89%
Working Families	Michael Gianaris	10,049	11.50%
Total	Michael Gianaris (incumbent)	58,869	67.39%
Republican	Han-Khon To	28,192	32.28%
Write-in		290	0.33%
Total votes		87,351	100.00%

=== District 13 ===
==== Results ====
New York's 13th State Senate district, 2024
Party	Candidate	Votes	%
Democratic	Jessica Ramos	40,572	82.50%
Working Families	Jessica Ramos	7,795	15.85%
Total	Jessica Ramos (incumbent)	48,367	98.35%
Write-in		810	1.65%
Total votes		49,177	100.00%

=== District 14 ===
==== Results ====
New York's 14th State Senate district, 2024
Party	Candidate	Votes	%
Democratic	Leroy Comrie (incumbent)	89,194	98.99%
Write-in		912	1.01%
Total votes		90,106	100.00%

=== District 15 ===
==== Results ====
New York's 15th State Senate district, 2024
Party	Candidate	Votes	%
Democratic	Joseph Addabbo Jr. (incumbent)	53,113	76.50%
Conservative	Danniel Maio	15,972	23.00%
Write-in		348	0.50%
Total votes		69,433	100.0%

=== District 16 ===
==== Results ====
New York's 16th State Senate district, 2024
Party	Candidate	Votes	%
Democratic	John Liu	43,841	71.81%
Working Families	John Liu	4,629	7.58%
Total	John Liu (incumbent)	48,470	79.39%
Conservative	Juan Pagan	12,299	20.14%
Write-in		286	0.47%
Total votes		61,055	100.00%

=== District 17 ===
Democratic incumbent Iwen Chu was defeated by Republican candidate Steve Chan, a former NYPD sergeant. This was the first time since 2016 that Republicans won a state senate seat based in Brooklyn. It also resulted in the Democrats losing their super-majority in the state senate.

==== Results ====
New York's 17th State Senate district, 2024
Party	Candidate	Votes	%
Republican	Steve Chan	27,938	49.47%
Conservative	Steve Chan	2,930	5.19%
Total	Steve Chan	30,868	54.66%
Democratic	Iwen Chu	22,679	40.16%
Working Families	Iwen Chu	2,685	4.75%
Total	Iwen Chu (incumbent)	25,364	44.91%
Write-in		240	0.43%
Total votes		56,472	100.00%
Republican gain from Democratic			

=== District 18 ===
==== Results ====
New York's 18th State Senate district, 2024
Party	Candidate	Votes	%
Democratic	Julia Salazar	54,800	80.03%
Working Families	Julia Salazar	13,089	19.12%
Total	Julia Salazar (incumbent)	67,889	99.15%
Write-in		585	0.85%
Total votes		68,474	100.00%

=== District 19 ===
==== Results ====
New York's 19th State Senate district, 2024
Party	Candidate	Votes	%
Democratic	Roxanne Persaud (incumbent)	74,011	99.58%
Write-in		313	0.42%
Total votes		74,324	100.00%

=== District 20 ===
==== Results ====
New York's 20th State Senate district, 2024
Party	Candidate	Votes	%
Democratic	Zellnor Myrie (incumbent)	107,498	99.34%
Write-in		714	0.66%
Total votes		108,212	100.00%

=== District 21 ===
==== Results ====
New York's 21st State Senate district, 2024
Party	Candidate	Votes	%
Democratic	Kevin Parker (incumbent)	82,275	98.44%
Write-in		1,307	1.56%
Total votes		83,582	100.00%

=== District 22 ===
==== Results ====
New York's 22nd State Senate district, 2024
Party	Candidate	Votes	%
Democratic	Simcha Felder	21,959	29.01%
Republican	Simcha Felder	46,468	61.40%
Conservative	Simcha Felder	6,572	8.68%
Total	Simcha Felder (incumbent)	74,999	99.09%
Write-in		689	0.91%
Total votes		75,688	100.00%

=== District 23 ===
==== Results ====
New York's 23rd State Senate district, 2024
Party	Candidate	Votes	%
Democratic	Jessica Scarcella-Spanton (incumbent)	47,737	54.98%
Republican	Marko Kepi	38,701	44.57%
Write-in		394	0.45%
Total votes		86,832	100.00%

=== District 24 ===
==== Results ====
New York's 24th State Senate district, 2024
Party	Candidate	Votes	%
Republican	Andrew Lanza	109,201	88.92%
Conservative	Andrew Lanza	11,443	9.32%
Total	Andrew Lanza (incumbent)	120,644	98.24%
Write-in		2,167	1.76%
Total votes		122,811	100.00%

=== District 25 ===
==== Results ====
New York's 25th State Senate district, 2024
Party	Candidate	Votes	%
Democratic	Jabari Brisport (incumbent)	90,484	99.42%
Write-in		525	0.58%
Total votes		91,009	100.00%

=== District 26 ===
==== Results ====
New York's 26th State Senate district, 2024
Party	Candidate	Votes	%
Democratic	Andrew Gounardes	78,176	67.16%
Working Families	Andrew Gounardes	13,231	11.37%
Total	Andrew Gounardes (incumbent)	91,407	78.53%
Republican	Vito Labella	21,445	18.42%
Conservative	Vito Labella	3,194	2.74%
Total	Vito Labella	24,639	21.16%
Write-in		357	0.31%
Total votes		116,403	100.00%

=== District 27 ===
==== Results ====
New York's 27th State Senate district, 2024
Party	Candidate	Votes	%
Democratic	Brian Kavanagh	79,048	88.79%
Working Families	Brian Kavanagh	9,169	10.30%
Total	Brian Kavanagh (incumbent)	88,217	99.09%
Write-in		807	0.91%
Total votes		89,024	100.00%

=== District 28 ===
==== Results ====
New York's 28th State Senate district, 2024
Party	Candidate	Votes	%
Democratic	Liz Krueger (incumbent)	97,851	75.88%
Republican	Louis Puliafito	30,881	23.94%
Write-in		229	0.18%
Total votes		128,961	100.00%

=== District 29 ===
==== Results ====
New York's 29th State Senate district, 2024
Party	Candidate	Votes	%
Democratic	José M. Serrano	60,984	75.82%
Working Families	José M. Serrano	4,733	5.88%
Total	José M. Serrano (incumbent)	65,717	81.70%
Republican	Tanya Carmichael	13,242	16.46%
Conservative	Tanya Carmichael	1,314	1.63%
Total	Tanya Carmichael	14,556	18.09%
Write-in		165	0.21%
Total votes		80,438	100.00%

=== District 30 ===
==== Results ====
New York's 30th State Senate district, 2024
Party	Candidate	Votes	%
Democratic	Cordell Cleare	80,476	88.48%
Working Families	Cordell Cleare	10,047	11.05%
Total	Cordell Cleare (incumbent)	90,523	99.53%
Write-in		427	0.47%
Total votes		90,950	100.00%

=== District 31 ===
==== Results ====
New York's 31st State Senate district, 2024
Party	Candidate	Votes	%
Democratic	Robert Jackson	61,088	86.32%
Working Families	Robert Jackson	9,206	13.01%
Total	Robert Jackson (incumbent)	70,294	99.33%
Write-in		476	0.67%
Total votes		70,770	100.00%

=== District 32 ===
==== Results ====
New York's 32nd State Senate district, 2024
Party	Candidate	Votes	%
Democratic	Luis R. Sepúlveda (incumbent)	45,549	79.00%
Republican	Bernadette Stroud	10,749	18.64%
Conservative	Bernadette Stroud	1,233	2.14%
Total	Bernadette Stroud	11,982	20.78%
Write-in		125	0.22%
Total votes		57,656	100.00%

=== District 33 ===
==== Results ====
New York's 33rd State Senate district, 2024
Party	Candidate	Votes	%
Democratic	Gustavo Rivera	47,793	69.13%
Working Families	Gustavo Rivera	3,842	5.56%
Total	Gustavo Rivera (incumbent)	51,635	74.69%
Republican	Dion Powell	15,868	22.95%
Conservative	Dion Powell	1,435	2.08%
Total	Dion Powell	17,303	25.03%
Write-in		194	0.28%
Total votes		69,132	100.00%

=== District 34 ===
==== Results ====
New York's 34th State Senate district, 2024
Party	Candidate	Votes	%
Democratic	Nathalia Fernandez (incumbent)	58,327	67.47%
Republican	Edwinna Herrera	25,395	29.38%
Conservative	Edwinna Herrera	2,513	2.91%
Total	Edwinna Herrera	27,908	32.29%
Write-in		208	0.24%
Total votes		86,443	100.00%

=== District 35 ===
==== Results ====
New York's 35th State Senate district, 2024
Party	Candidate	Votes	%
Democratic	Andrea Stewart-Cousins	77,106	62.76%
Working Families	Andrea Stewart-Cousins	4,148	3.38%
Total	Andrea Stewart-Cousins (incumbent)	81,254	66.14%
Republican	Khristen Kerr	41,541	33.81%
Write-in		55	0.05%
Total votes		122,850	100.00%

=== District 36 ===
==== Results ====
New York's 36th State Senate district, 2024
Party	Candidate	Votes	%
Democratic	Jamaal Bailey (incumbent)	77,594	91.49%
Conservative	Irene Estrada	7,086	8.35%
Write-in		133	0.16%
Total votes		84,813	100.0%

=== District 37 ===
==== Results ====
New York's 37th State Senate district, 2024
Party	Candidate	Votes	%
Democratic	Shelley Mayer	87,008	59.10%
Working Families	Shelley Mayer	3,873	2.63%
Total	Shelley Mayer (incumbent)	90,881	61.73%
Republican	Tricia Lindsay	52,077	35.37%
Conservative	Tricia Lindsay	4,207	2.86%
Total	Tricia Lindsay	56,284	38.23%
Write-in		59	0.04%
Total votes		147,224	100.00%

=== District 38 ===
==== Results ====
New York's 38th State Senate district, 2024
Party	Candidate	Votes	%
Republican	Bill Weber	63,428	47.95%
Conservative	Bill Weber	5,850	4.42%
Total	Bill Weber (incumbent)	69,278	52.37%
Democratic	Elijah Reichlin-Melnick	59,750	45.17%
Working Families	Barbara Francis	3,099	2.34%
Write-in		159	0.12%
Total votes		132,286	100.00%

=== District 39 ===
==== Results ====
New York's 39th State Senate district, 2024
Party	Candidate	Votes	%
Republican	Robert Rolison	67,312	45.12%
Conservative	Robert Rolison	8,282	5.55%
Total	Robert Rolison (incumbent)	75,594	50.67%
Democratic	Yvette Valdés Smith	67,756	45.42%
Working Families	Yvette Valdés Smith	5,764	3.87%
Total	Yvette Valdés Smith	73,520	49.29%
Write-in		63	0.04%
Total votes		149,177	100.00%

=== District 40 ===
==== Results ====
New York's 40th State Senate district, 2024
Party	Candidate	Votes	%
Democratic	Peter Harckham	84,088	50.87%
Working Families	Peter Harckham	4,494	2.72%
Total	Peter Harckham (incumbent)	88,582	53.59%
Republican	Gina Arena	69,751	42.20%
Conservative	Gina Arena	6,909	4.18%
Total	Gina Arena	76,660	46.38%
Write-in		59	0.03%
Total votes		165,301	100.00%

=== District 41 ===
==== Results ====
New York's 41st State Senate district, 2024
Party	Candidate	Votes	%
Democratic	Michelle Hinchey	88,604	50.85%
Working Families	Michelle Hinchey	13,550	7.77%
Total	Michelle Hinchey (incumbent)	102,154	58.62%
Republican	Patrick Sheehan	62,725	36.00%
Conservative	Patrick Sheehan	9,297	5.33%
Total	Patrick Sheehan	72,022	41.33%
Write-in		84	0.05%
Total votes		174,260	100.00%

=== District 42 ===
==== Results ====
New York's 42nd State Senate district, 2024
Party	Candidate	Votes	%
Democratic	James Skoufis	68,764	51.01%
Working Families	James Skoufis	4,656	3.45%
Total	James Skoufis (incumbent)	73,420	54.46%
Republican	Dorey F. Houle	54,614	40.51%
Conservative	Timothy Mitts	6,694	4.97%
Write-in		77	0.06%
Total votes		134,805	100.00%

=== District 43 ===
==== Results ====
New York's 43rd State Senate district, 2024
Party	Candidate	Votes	%
Republican	Jake Ashby	69,824	46.65%
Conservative	Jake Ashby	11,903	7.95%
Total	Jake Ashby (incumbent)	81,727	54.60%
Democratic	Alvin Gamble	67,824	45.32%
Write-in		112	0.08%
Total votes		149,663	100.00%

=== District 44 ===
==== Results ====
New York's 44th State Senate district, 2024
Party	Candidate	Votes	%
Republican	James Tedisco	81,103	50.75%
Conservative	James Tedisco	11,342	7.10%
Total	James Tedisco (incumbent)	92,445	57.85%
Democratic	Minita Sanghvi	62,254	38.95%
Working Families	Minita Sanghvi	5,030	3.15%
Total	Minita Sanghvi	67,284	42.10%
Write-in		85	0.05%
Total votes		159,814	100.00%

=== District 45 ===
==== Results ====
New York's 45th State Senate district, 2024
Party	Candidate	Votes	%
Republican	Dan Stec	90,514	84.49%
Conservative	Dan Stec	15,559	14.52%
Total	Dan Stec (incumbent)	106,073	99.01%
Write-in		1,056	0.99%
Total votes		107,129	100.00%

=== District 46 ===
The 46th district has been represented by Democrat Neil Breslin since 2023. Breslin is retiring at the end of 2024. Democrat Patricia Fahy, a former state assemblymember for the 109th district, won the general election.

==== Results ====
New York's 46th State Senate district, 2024
Party	Candidate	Votes	%
Democratic	Patricia Fahy	73,599	50.16%
Working Families	Patricia Fahy	8,377	5.71%
Total	Patricia Fahy	81,976	55.87%
Republican	Ted J. Danz Jr.	55,273	37.67%
Conservative	Ted J. Danz Jr.	9,326	6.36%
Total	Ted J. Danz Jr.	64,599	44.03%
Write-in		155	0.10%
Total votes		146,730	100.00%
Democratic hold			

=== District 47 ===
==== Results ====
New York's 47th State Senate district, 2024
Party	Candidate	Votes	%
Democratic	Brad Hoylman-Sigal	103,859	77.20%
Working Families	Brad Hoylman-Sigal	8,852	6.58%
Total	Brad Hoylman-Sigal (incumbent)	112,711	83.78%
Republican	Emily Yuexin Miller	21,537	16.01%
Write-in		280	0.21%
Total votes		134,528	100.00%

=== District 48 ===
==== Republican primary ====
2024 New York State Senate District 48 Republican primary
Party	Candidate	Votes	%
Republican	Caleb Slater	2,587	53.37
Republican	Fanny Villarreal	1,994	41.14
Total valid votes		4,847	100.00
Rejected ballots			
Total votes		4,847	100.00

==== General election ====
New York's 48th State Senate district, 2024
Party	Candidate	Votes	%
Democratic	Rachel May	71,227	52.80%
Working Families	Rachel May	7,555	5.60%
Total	Rachel May (incumbent)	78,782	58.40%
Republican	Caleb Slater	55,980	41.50
Write-in		144	0.10%
Total votes		134,906	100.00%

=== District 49 ===
==== Results ====
New York's 49th State Senate district, 2024
Party	Candidate	Votes	%
Republican	Mark Walczyk	94,382	86.81%
Conservative	Mark Walczyk	13,737	12.64%
Total	Mark Walczyk (incumbent)	108,119	99.45%
Write-in		599	0.55%
Total votes		108,718	100.00%

=== District 50 ===
Incumbent Democrat John Mannion announced his candidacy for the 22nd congressional district in the upcoming House of Representatives elections. Fellow Democrat Chris Ryan from Onondaga County won his seat.

==== Democratic primary ====
2024 New York State Senate District 50 Democratic primary
Party	Candidate	Votes	%
Democratic	Thomas Drumm	4,171	37.21
Democratic	Chris Ryan	5,895	52.59
Total valid votes		11,209	100.00
Rejected ballots			
Total votes		11,209	100.00

==== General election ====
New York's 50th State Senate district, 2024
Party	Candidate	Votes	%
Democratic	Chris Ryan	75,307	46.50%
Working Families	Chris Ryan	6,366	3.93%
Total	Chris Ryan	81,673	50.43%
Republican	Nick Paro	70,277	43.40%
Conservative	Nick Paro	9,886	6.10%
Total	Nick Paro	80,163	49.50%
Write-in		114	0.07%
Total votes		161,950	100.00%
Democratic hold			

=== District 51 ===
==== Results ====
New York's 51st State Senate district, 2024
Party	Candidate	Votes	%
Republican	Peter Oberacker	81,783	53.16%
Conservative	Peter Oberacker	9,499	6.17%
Total	Peter Oberacker (incumbent)	91,282	59.33%
Democratic	Michele Frazier	55,620	36.15%
Working Families	Michele Frazier	6,865	4.46%
Total	Michele Frazier	62,485	40.61%
Write-in		93	0.06%
Total votes		153,860	100.00%

=== District 52 ===
==== Results ====
New York's 52nd State Senate district, 2024
Party	Candidate	Votes	%
Democratic	Lea Webb	69,643	50.56%
Working Families	Lea Webb	9,532	6.92%
Total	Lea Webb (incumbent)	79,175	57.48%
Republican	Michael Sigler	56,361	40.92%
Local 607	Michael Sigler	2,068	1.50%
Total	Michael Sigler	58,429	42.42%
Write-in		140	0.10%
Total votes		137,744	100.00%

=== District 53 ===
==== Results ====
New York's 53rd State Senate district, 2024
Party	Candidate	Votes	%
Republican	Joseph Griffo	89,023	62.81%
Conservative	Joseph Griffo	10,436	7.36%
Total	Joseph Griffo (incumbent)	99,459	70.17%
Democratic	James Meyers	38,285	27.01%
Working Families	James Meyers	3,921	2.77%
Total	James Meyers	42,206	29.78%
Write-in		71	0.05%
Total votes		141,736	100.00%

=== District 54 ===
==== Results ====
New York's 54th State Senate district, 2024
Party	Candidate	Votes	%
Republican	Pamela Helming	88,996	55.49%
Conservative	Pamela Helming	14,441	9.01%
Total	Pamela Helming (incumbent)	103,437	64.50%
Democratic	Scott Comegys	56,888	35.47%
Write-in		51	0.03%
Total votes		160,376	100.00%

=== District 55 ===
==== Results ====
New York's 55th State Senate district, 2024
Party	Candidate	Votes	%
Democratic	Samra Brouk	89,485	56.36%
Working Families	Samra Brouk	8,255	5.20%
Total	Samra Brouk (incumbent)	97,740	61.56%
Republican	Luis Martinez	52,531	33.09%
Conservative	Luis Martinez	8,449	5.32%
Total	Luis Martinez	60,980	38.41%
Write-in		45	0.03%
Total votes		158,765	100.00%

=== District 56 ===
==== Results ====
New York's 56th State Senate district, 2024
Party	Candidate	Votes	%
Democratic	Jeremy Cooney	70,091	54.04%
Working Families	Jeremy Cooney	6,250	4.82%
Total	Jeremy Cooney (incumbent)	76,341	58.86%
Republican	Jim VanBrederode	45,830	35.34%
Conservative	Jim VanBrederode	7,462	5.75%
Total	Jim VanBrederode	53,292	41.09%
Write-in		69	0.05%
Total votes		129,702	100.00%

=== District 57 ===
==== Results ====
New York's 57th State Senate district, 2024
Party	Candidate	Votes	%
Republican	George Borrello	97,821	84.93%
Conservative	George Borrello	16,883	14.66%
Total	George Borrello (incumbent)	114,704	99.59%
Write-in		475	0.41%
Total votes		115,179	100.00%

=== District 58 ===
==== Results ====
New York's 58th State Senate district, 2024
Party	Candidate	Votes	%
Republican	Tom O'Mara	99,495	85.99%
Conservative	Tom O'Mara	15,319	13.24%
Total	Tom O'Mara (incumbent)	114,814	99.23%
Write-in		897	0.77%
Total votes		115,711	100.00%

=== District 59 ===
==== Democratic primary ====
2024 New York State Senate District 59 Democratic primary
Party	Candidate	Votes	%
Democratic	Kristen Gonzalez (incumbent)	14,091	83.90
Democratic	Gus Lambropoulos	2,442	14.54
Total valid votes		16,794	100.00
Rejected ballots			
Total votes		16,794	100.00

==== General election ====
New York's 59th State Senate district, 2024
Party	Candidate	Votes	%
Democratic	Kristen Gonzalez	84,379	83.37%
Working Families	Kristen Gonzalez	15,694	15.50%
Total	Kristen Gonzalez (incumbent)	100,073	98.87%
Write-in		1,142	1.13%
Total votes		101,215	100.00%

=== District 60 ===
==== Results ====
New York's 60th State Senate district, 2024
Party	Candidate	Votes	%
Republican	Patrick Gallivan	109,393	79.09%
Conservative	Patrick Gallivan	27,499	19.88%
Total	Patrick Gallivan (incumbent)	136,892	98.97%
Write-in		1,424	1.03%
Total votes		138,316	100.00%

=== District 61 ===
==== Results ====
New York's 61st State Senate district, 2024
Party	Candidate	Votes	%
Democratic	Sean Ryan	80,274	56.04%
Working Families	Sean Ryan	8,146	5.69%
Total	Sean Ryan (incumbent)	88,420	61.73%
Republican	Christine Czarnik	46,343	32.35%
Conservative	Christine Czarnik	8,323	5.81%
Total	Christine Czarnik	54,666	38.16%
Write-in		160	0.11%
Total votes		143,246	100.00%

=== District 62 ===
==== Results ====
New York's 62nd State Senate district, 2024
Party	Candidate	Votes	%
Republican	Robert Ortt	93,822	81.97%
Conservative	Robert Ortt	19,922	17.41%
Total	Robert Ortt (incumbent)	113,744	99.38%
Write-in		716	0.62%
Total votes		114,460	100.00%

=== District 63 ===
Incumbent Democrat Tim Kennedy resigned to run for the 26th congressional district. Fellow Democrat April Baskin won his seat in the general election.

==== Results ====
New York's 63rd State Senate district, 2024
Party	Candidate	Votes	%
Democratic	April Baskin	64,386	61.01%
Working Families	April Baskin	5,580	5.29%
Total	April Baskin	69,966	66.30%
Republican	John Moretti Jr.	30,043	28.47%
Conservative	John Moretti Jr.	5,341	5.06%
Total	John Moretti Jr.	35,384	33.53%
Write-in		180	0.17%
Total votes		105,530	100.00%
Democratic hold			

== See also ==
- List of New York State legislatures
