= New York's 63rd State Senate district =

American legislative district

Senator
| April Baskin; D–Buffalo |
- Registration: 65.4% Democratic; 12.2% Republican; 16.3% No party preference
- Demographics: 55% White; 32% Black; 7% Hispanic; 4% Asian
- Population (2017): 286,712
- Registered voters: 186,988

New York's 63rd State Senate district is one of 63 districts in the New York State Senate. It has been represented by Democrat April Baskin since 2025, succeeding Tim Kennedy. The district underwent redistricting, since Kennedy's 2010 primary defeat of incumbent William Stachowski.

Prior to 2012, the State Senate had only 62 districts, meaning that the 63rd district did not exist until then. However, the new district followed similar lines as the old Buffalo-based 58th district, and it was in fact the 46th district that was entirely new.

== Geography ==
District 63 covers parts of Erie County in Western New York, including most of Buffalo and all of Cheektowaga and Lackawanna.

The district is located entirely within New York's 26th congressional district, and overlaps with the 141st, 142nd, 143rd, and 149th districts of the New York State Assembly.

== List of office holders ==
| Name | Party | In office | Counties | Notes |
|---|---|---|---|---|
| Tim Kennedy | Democratic | January 1, 2011 – May 6, 2024 | Erie | Resigned after winning special election to the U.S. House of Representatives. |
| April Baskin | Democratic | January 1, 2025 – present | Erie | |

== Recent election results ==
=== 2026 ===
2026 New York State Senate election, District 63
| Party | Candidate | Votes | % |
|---|---|---|---|
| Democratic | April Baskin | | |
| Working Families | April Baskin | | |
| Total | April Baskin (incumbent) | | |
| Republican | Geoffrey Szymanski | | |
| Conservative | Geoffrey Szymanski | | |
| Total | Geoffrey Szymanski | | |
| Write-in | | | |
| Total votes | | | |

=== 2024 ===
2024 New York State Senate election, District 63
| Party | Candidate | Votes | % |
|---|---|---|---|
| Democratic | April McCants-Baskin | 64,386 | |
| Working Families | April McCants-Baskin | 5,580 | |
| Total | April McCants-Baskin | 69,966 | 66.3 |
| Republican | John Moretti Jr. | 30,043 | |
| Conservative | John Moretti Jr. | 5,341 | |
| Total | John Moretti Jr. | 35,384 | 33.6 |
| Write-in | | 180 | 0.1 |
| Total votes | | 105,530 | 100.0 |
| Democratic hold | | | |

=== 2022 ===
2022 New York State Senate election, District 63
| Party | Candidate | Votes | % |
|---|---|---|---|
| Democratic | Timothy Kennedy | 50,977 | |
| Working Families | Timothy Kennedy | 6,210 | |
| Total | Timothy Kennedy (incumbent) | 57,187 | 82.7 |
| Conservative | Faye Pietrak | 11,885 | 17.2 |
| Write-in | | 104 | 0.1 |
| Total votes | | 69,176 | 100.0 |
| Democratic hold | | | |

=== 2020 ===
2020 New York State Senate election, District 63
| Party | Candidate | Votes | % |
|---|---|---|---|
| Democratic | Timothy Kennedy | 81,368 | |
| Working Families | Timothy Kennedy | 10,485 | |
| Independence | Timothy Kennedy | 3,361 | |
| Total | Timothy Kennedy (incumbent) | 95,484 | 99.0 |
| Write-in | | 984 | 1.0 |
| Total votes | | 96,468 | 100.0 |
| Democratic hold | | | |

=== 2018 ===
2018 New York State Senate election, District 63
Primary election
| Party | Candidate | Votes | % |
|---|---|---|---|
| Democratic | Timothy Kennedy (incumbent) | 23,640 | 76.7 |
| Democratic | Shaqurah Zachery | 7,198 | 23.3 |
| Write-in | | 0 | 0.0 |
| Total votes | | 30,838 | 100.0 |
General election
| Democratic | Timothy Kennedy | 62,370 | |
| Working Families | Timothy Kennedy | 3,811 | |
| Independence | Timothy Kennedy | 3,006 | |
| Women's Equality | Timothy Kennedy | 1,034 | |
| Total | Timothy Kennedy (incumbent) | 70,221 | 100.0 |
| Write-in | | 0 | 0.0 |
| Total votes | | 70,221 | 100.0 |
| Democratic hold | | | |

=== 2016 ===
2016 New York State Senate election, District 63
| Party | Candidate | Votes | % |
|---|---|---|---|
| Democratic | Timothy Kennedy | 78,674 | |
| Working Families | Timothy Kennedy | 6,034 | |
| Independence | Timothy Kennedy | 3,751 | |
| Women's Equality | Timothy Kennedy | 1,191 | |
| Total | Timothy Kennedy (incumbent) | 89,650 | 100.0 |
| Write-in | | 0 | 0.0 |
| Total votes | | 89,650 | 100.0 |
| Democratic hold | | | |

=== 2014 ===
2014 New York State Senate election, District 63
Primary election
| Party | Candidate | Votes | % |
|---|---|---|---|
| Democratic | Timothy Kennedy (incumbent) | 16,660 | 60.2 |
| Democratic | Betty Jean Grant | 10,997 | 39.8 |
| Write-in | | 0 | 0.0 |
| Total votes | | 27,657 | 100.0 |
| Independence | Timothy Kennedy (incumbent) | 287 | 65.1 |
| Independence | Ricky Donovan Sr. | 154 | 34.9 |
| Write-in | | 0 | 0.0 |
| Total votes | | 441 | 100.0 |
General election
| Democratic | Timothy Kennedy | 36,778 | |
| Working Families | Timothy Kennedy | 3,499 | |
| Independence | Timothy Kennedy | 2,001 | |
| Total | Timothy Kennedy (incumbent) | 42,278 | 77.9 |
| Republican | Ricky Donovan Sr. | 8,358 | |
| Conservative | Ricky Donovan Sr. | 3,435 | |
| Total | Ricky Donovan Sr. | 11,973 | 22.1 |
| Write-in | | 0 | 0.0 |
| Total votes | | 54,251 | 100.0 |
| Democratic hold | | | |

=== 2012 ===
2012 New York State Senate election, District 63
Primary election
| Party | Candidate | Votes | % |
|---|---|---|---|
| Democratic | Timothy M. Kennedy (incumbent) | 11,587 | 50.3 |
| Democratic | Betty Jean Grant | 11,431 | 49.7 |
| Write-in | | 0 | 0.0 |
| Total votes | | 23,018 | 100.0 |
General election
| Democratic | Timothy Kennedy | 71,662 | |
| Working Families | Timothy Kennedy | 6,361 | |
| Independence | Timothy Kennedy | 4,435 | |
| Total | Timothy Kennedy (incumbent) | 82,458 | 100.0 |
| Write-in | | 0 | 0.0 |
| Total votes | | 82,458 | 100.0 |
| Democratic hold | | | |

=== Federal results in District 63 ===
| Year | Office | Results |
|---|---|---|
| 2020 | President | Biden 69.4 – 28.9% |
| 2016 | President | Clinton 66.9 – 29.3% |
| 2012 | President | Obama 75.3 – 23.1% |
| 2012 | Senate | Gillibrand 82.4 – 15.9% |
