= 2024 New York's 26th congressional district special election =

- April 30, 2024

New York's 26th congressional district
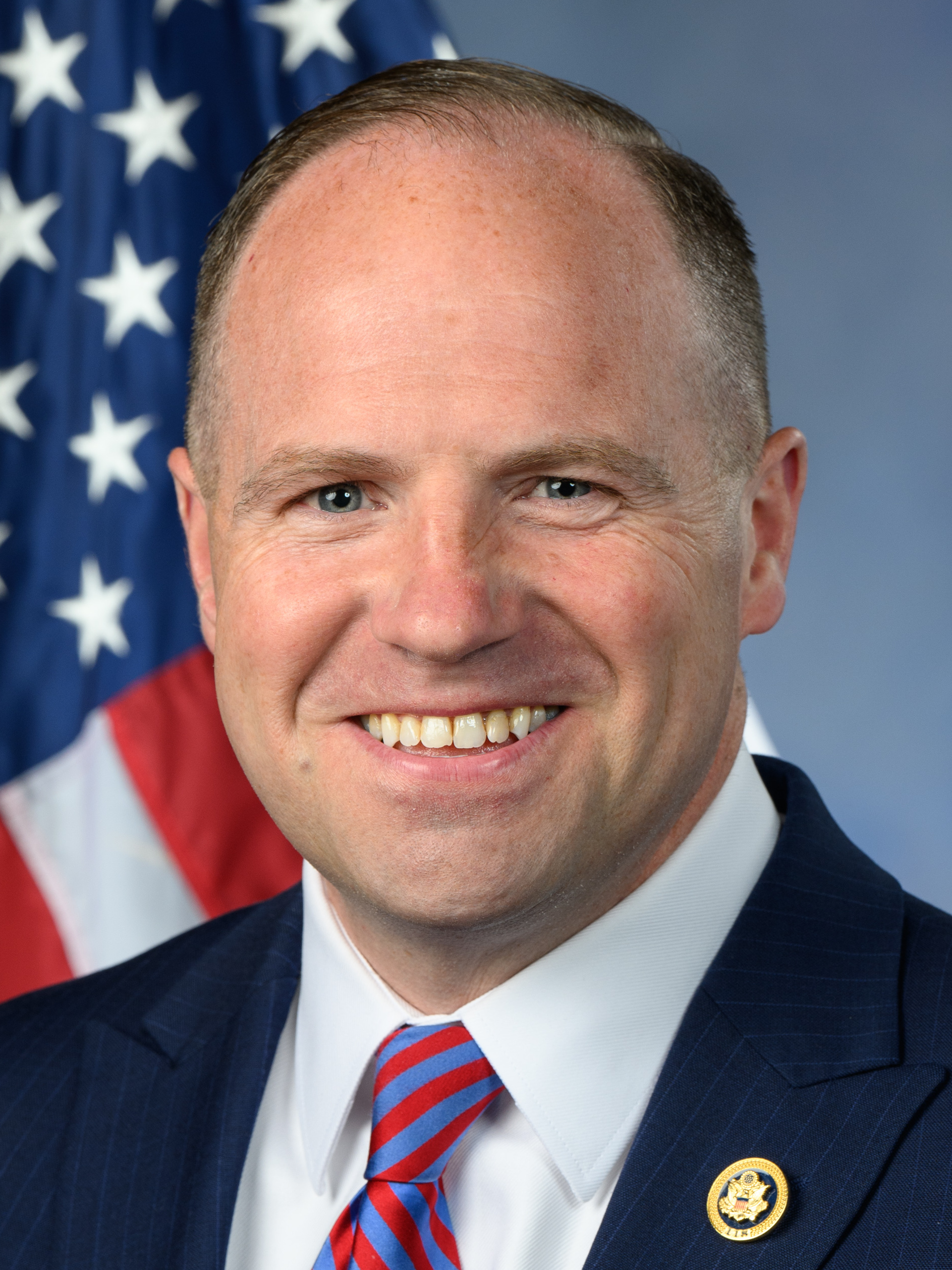

Nominee	Tim Kennedy	Gary Dickson
Party	Democratic	Republican
Alliance	Working Families	Conservative
Popular vote	48,050	21,982
Percentage	68.5%	31.3%
U.S. Representative before election
Brian Higgins
Democratic
Elected U.S. Representative
Tim Kennedy
Democratic

The 2024 New York's 26th congressional district special election was held on April 30, 2024, to fill the vacant seat in New York's 26th congressional district. The seat became vacant after Democratic incumbent Brian Higgins resigned on February 2, 2024, to become president of Shea's Performing Arts Center. The early voting period ran from April 20 to April 28, 2024.

The Associated Press declared Tim Kennedy the winner within an hour of the polls closing. He served in the United States House of Representatives for the remainder of the 118th United States Congress.

== Nominees ==
New York does not use primary elections when filling vacancies. Instead, party officials in the affected counties are responsible for choosing nominees.

=== Democratic Party ===
The Erie County Democratic Committee chose their nominee on February 21, 2024.

==== Candidates ====
===== Nominated =====
- Tim Kennedy, state senator from the 63rd district (2011–present)

===== Lost nomination =====
- Nate McMurray, former town supervisor of Grand Island and nominee for the 27th district in 2018 and 2020 (ran as an independent)
- Jeanne Vinal, Erie County legislator (2020–present)

===== Declined =====
- Byron Brown, mayor of Buffalo (2006–2024), former chair of the New York Democratic Party (2016–2019), and former state senator from the 60th district (2001–2005)
- Mark Poloncarz, Erie County executive (2012–present)

=== Republican Party ===
The Erie County Republican Committee chose their nominee on February 21, 2024.

==== Candidates ====
===== Nominated =====
- Gary Dickson, town supervisor (Note: In New York, the position of town supervisor is equivalent to mayor.) of West Seneca (2019–present)

=== Independents ===
==== Withdrawn ====
- Nate McMurray, (Note: McMurray is a Democrat, but tried to qualify for the ballot as an independent.) former town supervisor of Grand Island and nominee for the 27th district in 2018 and 2020

== General election ==
=== Endorsements ===
Tim Kennedy (D)

U.S. representatives

- Brian Higgins, former U.S. representative for this district (2005–2024)
- Annie Kuster, U.S. representative for NH 2 (2013–present)

Statewide officials

- Letitia James, attorney general of New York (2019–present)

Individuals

- Marshall Wittmann, political commentator

Labor unions

- 1199SEIU United Healthcare Workers East
- Civil Service Employees Association Local 1000
- Communications Workers of America District 1
- International Union of Bricklayers and Allied Craftworkers Local 3
- New York State AFL-CIO
- Transport Workers Union of America Local 100
- United Auto Workers Region 9

Organizations

- AIPAC
- Democratic Majority for Israel
- Erie County Federation of Democratic Women
- Human Rights Campaign
- National Committee to Preserve Social Security and Medicare
- New York League of Conservation Voters
- NewDem Action Fund
- Sierra Club

Newspapers

- The Buffalo News

Political parties

- New York Democratic Party
- Working Families Party
Gary Dickson (R)

Political parties

- Conservative Party of New York State
- New York Republican Party

=== Debate ===
2024 New York's 26th congressional district special election debates
No.	Date	Host	Moderators	Links	Democratic	Republican
P Participant A Absent N Non-invitee I Invitee W Withdrawn						
P Participant A Absent N Non-invitee I Invitee W Withdrawn					Tim Kennedy	Gary Dickson
1	April 24, 2024	WIVB-TV	Marlee Tuskes; Dave Greber	YouTube	P	P

=== Results ===
2024 New York's 26th congressional district special election
Party	Candidate	Votes	%	±%
Democratic	Tim Kennedy	44,411	62.60%	+4.80
Working Families	Tim Kennedy	3,639	5.13%	−0.97
Total	Tim Kennedy	48,050	67.73%	+3.83
Republican	Gary Dickson	16,859	23.76%	−4.94
Conservative	Gary Dickson	5,123	7.22%	−0.08
Total	Gary Dickson	21,982	30.98%	−5.02
Write-in		159	0.22%	+0.12
Total votes		70,946	100.0%	
Democratic hold				

By county

County	Tim Kennedy Democratic		Gary Dickson Republican		Write-in		Margin		Total votes
County	#	%	#	%	#	%	#	%	Total votes
Erie	41,206	71.19	16,530	28.56	146	0.25	24,676	42.63	57,882
Niagara	6,844	55.60	5,452	44.29	13	0.11	1,392	11.31	12,309
Total	48,050	68.46	21,982	31.32	159	0.23	26,068	37.14	70,191

== See also ==
- 2024 United States House of Representatives elections
  - 2024 United States House of Representatives elections in New York
- List of special elections to the United States House of Representatives
- List of United States representatives from New York
- 118th United States Congress
