= Joseph M. Margiotta =

American politician

Member of the New York State Assembly
- In office January 1, 1966 – December 31, 1976
- Preceded by: District created
- Succeeded by: Kemp Hannon
- Constituency: 15th district (1966); 12th district (1967-1972); 17th district (1973-1976)

Personal details
- Born: June 6, 1927
- Died: November 28, 2008 (aged 81) Flower Hill, New York
- Party: Republican

Joseph M. Margiotta (June 6, 1927 – November 28, 2008) was an American political boss who ran the Nassau County, New York Republican Party, considered "one of the most powerful political organizations in New York State", until his 1983 convictions on federal charges.

== Life ==
Margiotta represented Uniondale in the New York State Assembly from 1966 to 1976, sitting in the 176th, 177th, 178th, 179th, 180th and 181st New York State Legislatures.

Margiotta became chairman of the Nassau Republican Party in 1967, exercising control over political appointments and patronage jobs, and playing an active role in issues including allocation of cable television franchises and bridge tolls. Residents would often call a local Republican committeeman to deal with issues like broken streetlights instead of calling a county agency.

At a campaign rally held in 1972 with a crowd of 15,000 at the Nassau Coliseum as part of Richard Nixon's re-election campaign, Nixon's opening words were "This is the biggest and best rally, Joe Margiotta, I have ever seen".

He was convicted in 1981 for his involvement in a scheme in which a Long Island insurance company would split its commissions with Republican politicians, with some $678,000 brought in over a decade. The government's case relied on the presumption that Margiotta's influence over county government made him a public official subject to federal extortion laws, even though he was not an elected official. Margiotta insisted that he had not broken any laws, stating that "I've been convicted because I’ve been a successful political leader". After his conviction on federal mail fraud and conspiracy charges as part of the municipal insurance kickback scheme, he was forced to resign from his post and spent 14 months in prison.

Among his most successful protégés were former United States Senator Alfonse M. D'Amato, former New York State Republican Party chairman Joseph Mondello, and Dean Skelos, majority leader of the New York State Senate.

Margiotta, a resident of Brookville, New York, died on November 28, 2008, in St. Francis Hospital in Flower Hill, New York, where he had been hospitalized for nearly a week.

== Hofstra University ==
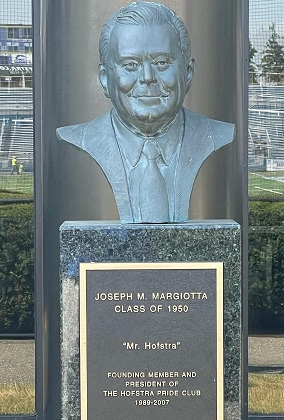
Head bust of Joseph Margiotta on Hofstra University campus which stands outside the main athletic complex.

Margiotta was an alumnus of Hofstra University, which named its field house Margiotta Hall in his honor in 1991. Margiotta was a Hofstra student-athlete and long-time supporter. He founded the Hofstra Pride Club and served as its president for more than 20 years. The Joseph M. Margiotta Distinguished Service Award is given annually by Hofstra in recognition of extraordinary dedication, generosity and service to the Hofstra Pride Club and Hofstra athletics.

New York State Assembly
Preceded by new district	New York State Assembly; 15th District; 1966	Succeeded by Eli Wager
Preceded by Milton Jonas	New York State Assembly; 12th District; 1967–1972	Succeeded by George A. Murphy
Preceded by John E. Kingston	New York State Assembly; 17th District; 1973–1976	Succeeded by Kemp Hannon
