= New York's 6th State Senate district =

American legislative district

Senator
Siela Bynoe; D–Westbury
- Registration: 38.5% Democratic; 33.3% Republican; 22.9% No party preference
- Demographics: 58% White; 14% Black; 20% Hispanic; 6% Asian
- Population (2017): 322,424
- Registered voters: 232,954

New York's 6th State Senate district is one of 63 districts in the New York State Senate currently represented by Democrat Siela Bynoe.

== Geography ==
District 6 is located in central Nassau County on Long Island. It includes portions of the town of Hempstead including Hempstead village, Garden City, Uniondale, Freeport, and Baldwin and stretches into southern North Hempstead including Westbury and New Cassel.

The district overlaps with New York's 2nd, 3rd, and 4th congressional districts, and with the 9th, 14th, 15th, 17th, 18th, 19th, 21st, and 22nd districts of the New York State Assembly.

== Recent election results ==
=== 2026 ===
2026 New York State Senate election, District 6
Party	Candidate	Votes	%
Democratic	Siela Bynoe		
Working Families	Siela Bynoe		
Total	Siela Bynoe (incumbent)		
Republican	Matthew Capp		
Conservative	Matthew Capp		
Total	Matthew Capp		
Write-in			
Total votes			

=== 2024 ===
2024 New York State Senate election, District 6
Primary election
Party	Candidate	Votes	%
Democratic	Siela Bynoe	6,683	53.9
Democratic	Taylor Darling	5,593	45.7
Write-in		52	0.4
Total votes		12,328	100.0
General election
Democratic	Siela Bynoe	78,937	60.8
Republican	Thomas Montefinise	46,276	
Conservative	Thomas Montefinise	4,437	
Total	Thomas Montefinise	50,713	39.1
Write-in		117	0.1
Total votes		129,767	100.0
Democratic hold			

=== 2022 ===
2022 New York State Senate election, District 6
Party	Candidate	Votes	%
Democratic	Kevin Thomas	52,510	
Working Families	Kevin Thomas	1,503	
Total	Kevin Thomas (incumbent)	54,013	59.2
Republican	James Coll	33,877	
Conservative	James Coll	3,354	
Total	James Coll	37,231	40.8
Write-in		45	0.0
Total votes		91,289	100.0
Democratic hold			

=== 2020 ===
2020 New York State Senate election, District 6
Primary election
Party	Candidate	Votes	%
Libertarian	Jonathan Gunther	26	72.2
Libertarian	Dennis Dunne Sr.	5	13.9
Write-in		5	13.9
Total votes		36	100.0
General election
Democratic	Kevin Thomas	74,035	
Working Families	Kevin Thomas	2,553	
Total	Kevin Thomas (incumbent)	76,588	50.7
Republican	Dennis Dunne Sr.	66,631	
Conservative	Dennis Dunne Sr.	6,088	
Independence	Dennis Dunne Sr.	911	
Total	Dennis Dunne Sr.	73,630	48.7
Libertarian	Jonathan Gunther	855	0.6
Write-in		38	0.0
Total votes		151,111	100.0
Democratic hold			

=== 2018 ===
2018 New York State Senate election, District 6
Party	Candidate	Votes	%
Democratic	Kevin Thomas	53,630	
Working Families	Kevin Thomas	1,028	
Women's Equality	Kevin Thomas	546	
Total	Kevin Thomas	55,204	50.8
Republican	Kemp Hannon	47,510	
Conservative	Kemp Hannon	4,906	
Independence	Kemp Hannon	810	
Reform	Kemp Hannon	170	
Total	Kemp Hannon (incumbent)	53,396	49.1
Write-in		40	0.0
Total votes		108,640	100.0
Democratic gain from Republican			

=== 2016 ===
2016 New York State Senate election, District 6
Party	Candidate	Votes	%
Republican	Kemp Hannon	62,674	
Conservative	Kemp Hannon	6,892	
Independence	Kemp Hannon	1,383	
Tax Revolt Party	Kemp Hannon	395	
Reform	Kemp Hannon	279	
Total	Kemp Hannon (incumbent)	71,623	53.8
Democratic	Ryan Cronin	58,623	
Working Families	Ryan Cronin	2,085	
Women's Equality	Ryan Cronin	817	
Total	Ryan Cronin	61,525	46.2
Write-in		64	0.0
Total votes		133,212	100.0
Republican hold			

=== 2014 ===
2014 New York State Senate election, District 6
Party	Candidate	Votes	%
Republican	Kemp Hannon	35,281	
Conservative	Kemp Hannon	5,189	
Independence	Kemp Hannon	1,661	
Tax Revolt Party	Kemp Hannon	183	
Total	Kemp Hannon (incumbent)	42,314	63.1
Democratic	Ethan Irwin	22,986	
Working Families	Ethan Irwin	1,716	
Total	Ethan Irwin	24,702	36.9
Write-in		28	0.0
Total votes		67,044	100.0
Republican hold			

=== 2012 ===
2012 New York State Senate election, District 6
Party	Candidate	Votes	%
Republican	Kemp Hannon	49,998	
Conservative	Kemp Hannon	6,526	
Independence	Kemp Hannon	1,987	
Tax Revolt Party	Kemp Hannon	332	
Total	Kemp Hannon (incumbent)	58,843	52.0
Democratic	Ryan Cronin	51,355	
Working Families	Ryan Cronin	3,027	
Total	Ryan Cronin	54,382	48.0
Write-in		25	0.0
Total votes		113,250	100.0
Republican hold			

=== Federal results in District 6 ===
Year	Office	Results
2020	President	Biden 52.7 – 45.9%
2016	President	Clinton 50.0 – 47.2%
2012	President	Obama 54.7 – 44.3%
2012	Senate	Gillibrand 64.5 – 34.6%
