= George A. Murphy =

American politician (1923–2015)

Member of the New York State Assembly from the 12th district
- In office January 1, 1973 – December 31, 1978
- Preceded by: Joseph M. Margiotta
- Succeeded by: Frederick E. Parola

Member of the New York State Senate from the 4th district
- In office November 2, 1971 – December 31, 1972
- Preceded by: Edward J. Speno
- Succeeded by: Owen H. Johnson

Personal details
- Born: March 16, 1923 Brooklyn, New York
- Died: August 11, 2015 (aged 92)
- Party: Republican
- Children: 10

George Austin Murphy (March 16, 1923 – August 11, 2015) was an American lawyer and politician from New York.

== Life ==
Murphy was born on March 16, 1923, in Brooklyn, New York City and raised in Merrick, New York. He attended Merrick Grammar School and Wellington C. Mepham High School. Murphy then enrolled at St. John's University, but left to enter the U.S. Army during World War II. He served in both the European and Pacific theatres and rose to the rank of major.

After the war, Murphy completed an LL.B. degree at the St. John's University School of Law in 1949 and was admitted to the New York state bar that same year. He then earned a B.S. degree from Fordham University in 1951. Murphy practiced law in Seaford, Nassau County, and entered politics as a Republican. In 1952, he married Teresa, and they had ten children.

In 1954, Murphy was admitted to practice before the Supreme Court of the United States. On November 2, 1971, he was elected to the New York State Senate (4th D.), to fill the vacancy caused by the death of Edward J. Speno, and took his seat in the 179th New York State Legislature during the special session in December 1971. In November 1972, after re-apportionment, Murphy was nominated for election in the 12th State Assembly District.

Murphy was a member of the New York State Assembly from 1973 to 1978, sitting in the 180th, 181st and 182nd New York State Legislatures. In November 1978, he was elected to the New York Supreme Court. Murphy was re-elected in 1992 and retired in 1998.

Murphy died from complications of a stroke on August 11, 2015, and was buried at the Long Island National Cemetery.

Nassau County District Court Judge Terence Murphy (born 1956) is his son.

New York State Senate
Preceded by Edward J. Speno	New York State Senate; 4th District; 1971–1972	Succeeded by Owen H. Johnson
New York State Assembly
Preceded by Joseph M. Margiotta	New York State Assembly; 12th District; 1973–1978	Succeeded by Frederick E. Parola
