= Tom O'Mara =

American politician

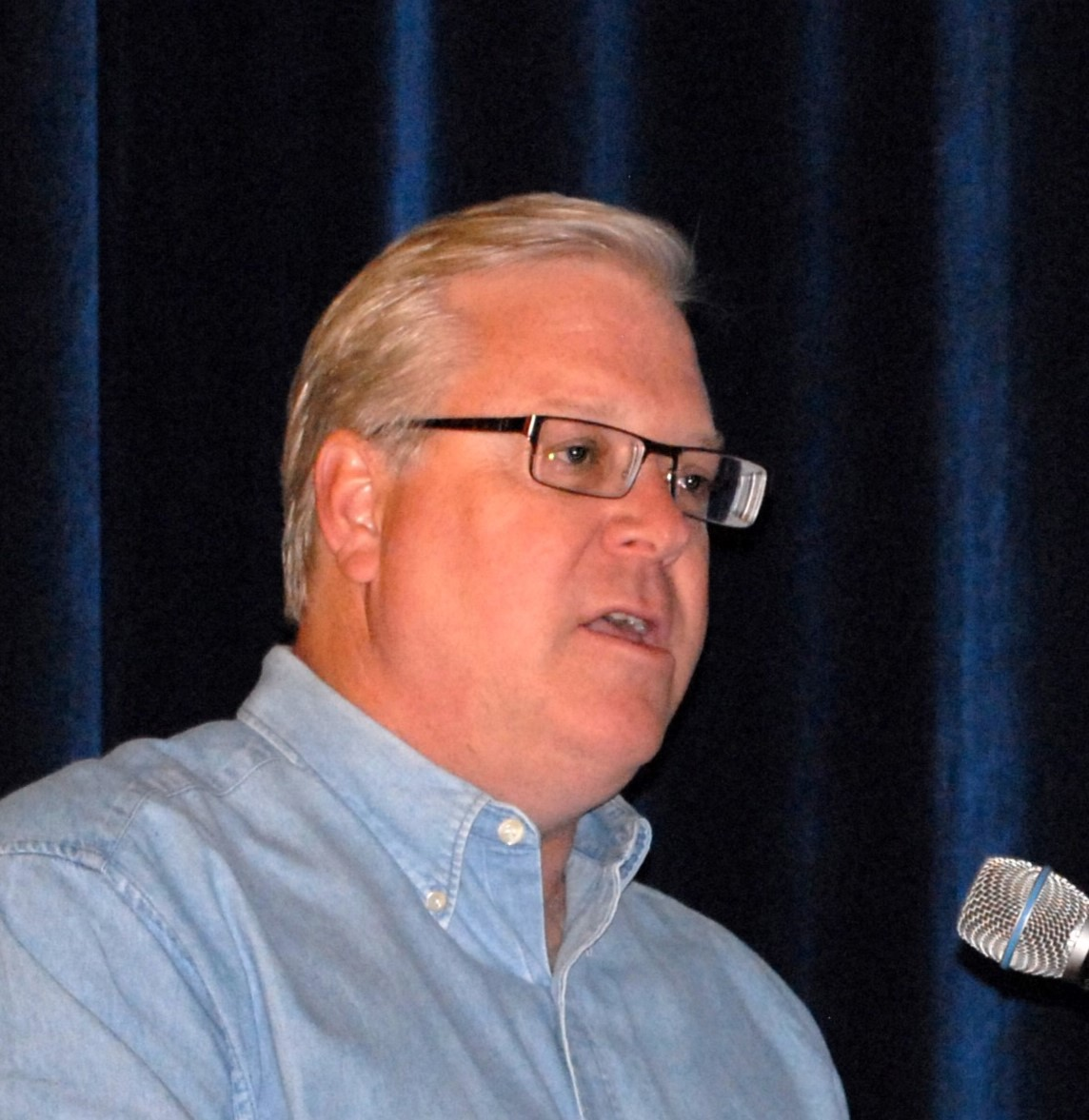
- O'Mara in 2014

Member of the New York Senate from the 58th district
- Incumbent
- Assumed office January 1, 2011
- Preceded by: George H. Winner, Jr.
- Constituency: 53rd district 2011-2012; 58th district 2013-present

Member of the New York State Assembly from the 137th district
- In office January 1, 2005 – December 31, 2010
- Preceded by: George H. Winner, Jr.
- Succeeded by: Christopher Friend

Personal details
- Born: May 31, 1963 (age 63) Elmira, New York, U.S.
- Party: Republican
- Spouse: Marilyn
- Children: 3
- Education: Catholic University of America; Syracuse University College of Law
- Profession: lawyer, politician
- Website: Official website

Thomas F. O'Mara (born May 31, 1963) is a member of the New York State Senate, serving a district in the Southern Tier of New York since 2010. The district is currently numbered the 58th district. O'Mara is a Republican.

Prior to serving in the Senate, O'Mara represented the 137th district of the New York State Assembly from 2005 to 2010.

== Background ==
O'Mara was raised in Horseheads, New York. He received his bachelor's degree from Catholic University of America and later a Juris Doctor from Syracuse University College of Law. He worked as an Assistant District Attorney and County Attorney in Chemung County before becoming the Chemung County District Attorney.

He was first elected to the New York State Assembly in 2004 and represented the 137th Assembly District, which comprised all of Chemung and Schuyler County and portions of Tioga County. He served three two-year terms in the Assembly.

He is a member of the law firm Davidson & O'Mara in Elmira. He and his wife Marilyn have three children Thomas, Catherine and Caroline and reside in Big Flats, New York.

== New York Senate ==
In 2010, O'Mara was first elected to represent the 53rd District in the New York State Senate after surviving a strong primary challenge from fellow Assemblyman James Bacalles. He defeated Democrat Pamela Mackesey in the general election and took office in January 2011.

In 2011, O'Mara voted against allowing same-sex marriage during the senate roll-call vote on the Marriage Equality Act, which the Senate narrowly passed 33-29 legalizing same-sex marriage.

Since his initial election in 2010, O'Mara has never faced a serious re-election, running unopposed in 2012 and 2014. His closest election came in 2016, when he defeated Democrat Leslie Danks-Burke 55% to 45%. He easily won re-election again in 2018.

New York State Assembly
Preceded by George H. Winner, Jr.	New York State Assembly, 137th District; 2005–2010	Succeeded by Christopher Friend
New York State Senate
Preceded by George H. Winner, Jr.	New York State Senate, 53rd District; 2011–2012	Succeeded by David J. Valesky
Preceded by Timothy M. Kennedy	New York State Senate, 58th District; 2013–present	Incumbent
