= Kemp Hannon =

American politician

Member of the New York Senate from the 6th district
- In office December 27, 1989 – December 31, 2018
- Preceded by: John R. Dunne
- Succeeded by: Kevin Thomas

Member of the New York State Assembly from the 17th district
- In office January 1, 1977 – December 26, 1989
- Preceded by: Joseph M. Margiotta
- Succeeded by: Michael Balboni

Personal details
- Born: January 10, 1946 (age 80) Garden City, New York, U.S
- Party: Republican
- Website: Campaign website

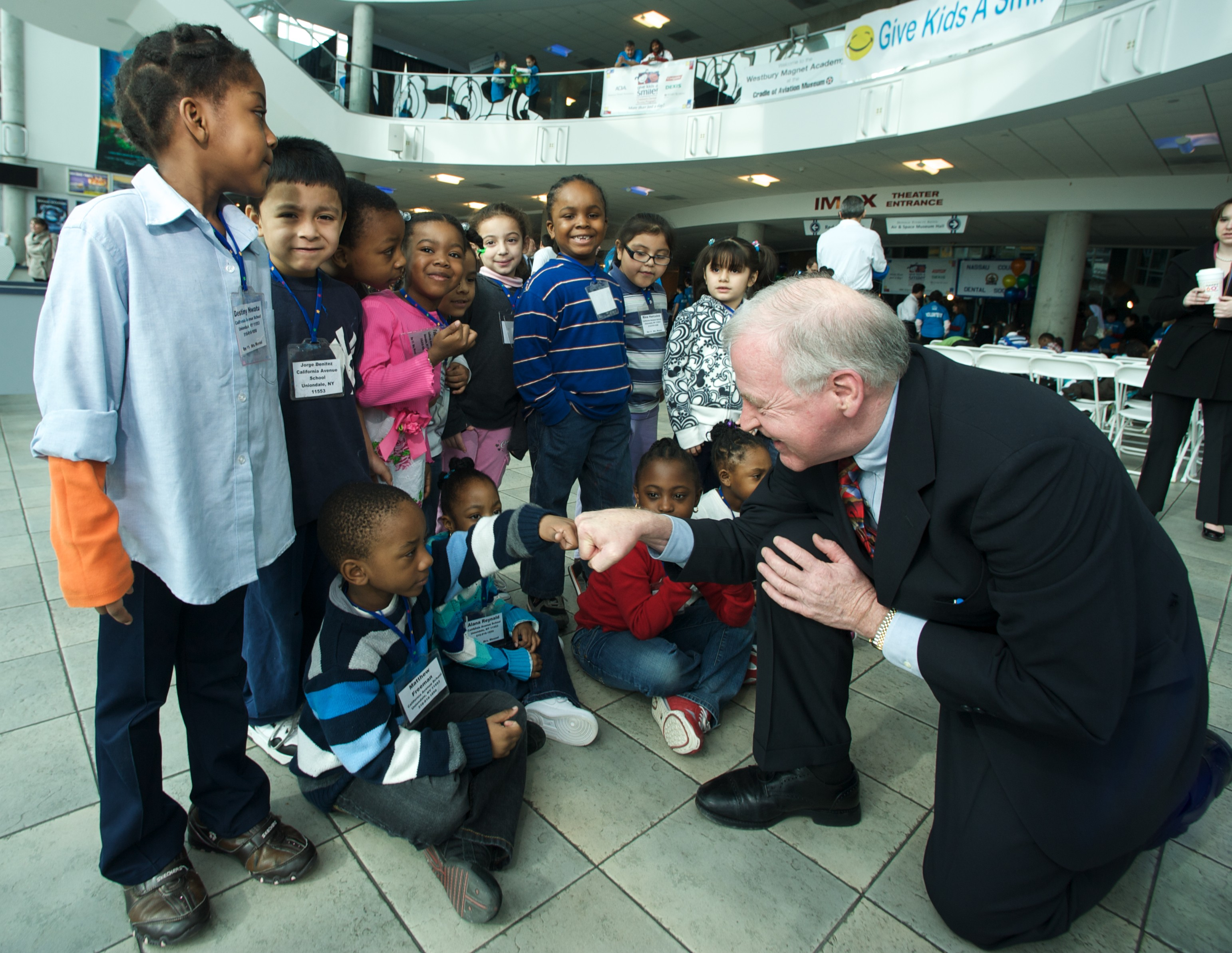
J. kemp Hannon Give Kids A Smile.jpg

J. Kemp Hannon (born January 10, 1946) is an American politician. A Republican, Hannon was a member of the New York State Senate from the 6th district in Nassau County between 1989 and 2018.

== Biography ==
Hannon graduated from Chaminade High School (1963), Boston College (1967) and Fordham University School of Law (1970). During the presidential primary season of 1976, Hannon was a panelmember for an episode of Firing Line with William F. Buckley, Jr., discussing whether Reagan or Ford was the better nominee.

He was Special Counsel to the law firm Farrell Fritz, P.C., ending the association on January 31, 2017. Hannon resides in Garden City, New York, with his wife Bronwyn and their twin daughters, Alexandra and Madeleine.

Hannon served in the New York State Assembly from 1977 to 1989, sitting in the 182nd, 183rd, 184th, 185th, 186th, 187th and 188th New York State Legislatures. In 1989, he was elected to the New York State Senate to fill the vacancy caused by the resignation of John R. Dunne. Hannon represented the 6th State Senate District, which includes Levittown, Massapequa, Garden City, Uniondale, Hempstead, Farmingdale, Franklin Square, Old Bethpage, Salisbury, Garden City South, Plainview, Lakeview, Plainedge, Island Trees and East Meadow.

A Republican, Hannon chaired the New York State Senate Health Committee for nearly two decades.

In 2011, Hannon voted against allowing same-sex marriage in New York during a Senate roll-call vote on the Marriage Equality Act, which passed after a close 33-29 vote. On January 14, 2013, Hannon voted in favor of the NY SAFE Act (a gun control bill), which the Senate passed 43-18. On June 10, 2014, the State Senate passed medical marijuana legislation that was later signed into law by Gov. Andrew Cuomo; Hannon, along with nine other Senate Republicans, voted against the bill.

On November 6, 2018, after having served 29 years in the New York State Senate, Hannon was unexpectedly defeated in his re-election bid by Democratic challenger Kevin Thomas.

New York State Assembly
Preceded by Joseph M. Margiotta	New York State Assembly; 17th District; 1977–1989	Succeeded by Michael Balboni
New York State Senate
Preceded by John R. Dunne	New York State Senate; 6th District; 1989–2018	Succeeded by Kevin Thomas
