= April Baskin =

American politician

April N. M. Baskin
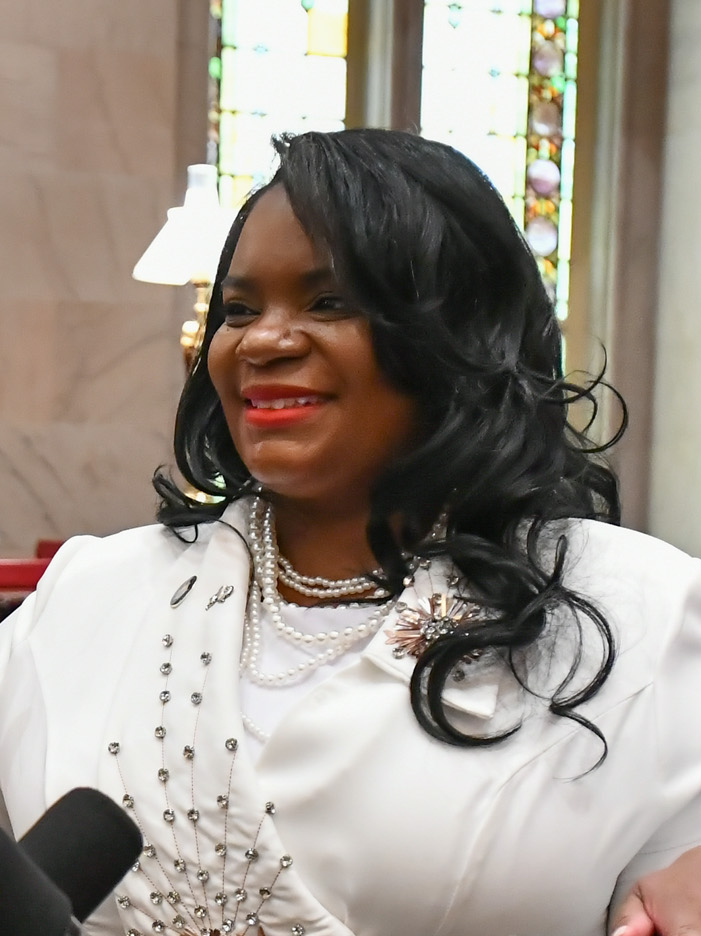

Member of the New York State Senate from the 63rd district
- Incumbent
- Assumed office January 1, 2025
- Preceded by: Tim Kennedy

Member of the Erie County Legislature from the 2nd district
- In office January 2018 – January 2025
- Preceded by: Betty Jean Grant
- Succeeded by: Taisha St. Jean Tard

Personal details
- Born: Buffalo, New York, U.S.
- Party: Democratic
- Education: Empire State University (BA)

April N. M. Baskin (formerly McCants-Baskin) is an American politician serving as a member of the New York State Senate for the 63rd district, which comprises most of Buffalo.

== Erie County Legislature ==
In 2018, Baskin was elected to the Erie County Legislature to represent the 2nd District, and was immediately named Majority Leader. She ran unopposed in the 2017 general election, receiving 11,076 votes.

In 2019, she became the youngest person to be elected as chairwoman of the Erie County Legislature. As chairwoman, Baskin pushed for a 33-year, $140 million-plus Community Benefits Agreement as a condition of a new stadium.

== New York Senate ==
In 2024, she was elected to replace Tim Kennedy as New York State Senator for the 63rd District, becoming the first Black woman to represent Western New York in the State Senate. She defeated Republican John P. Moretti, Jr. with 65.9% of the vote.

In her freshman year, Baskin sponsored "Desha's Law", which requires a cardiac emergency response plan to be implemented in every public school in New York State. Passed unanimously, the bill was signed into law at a ceremony hosted by Governor Kathy Hochul in July 2025.
