= Siela Bynoe =

American politician

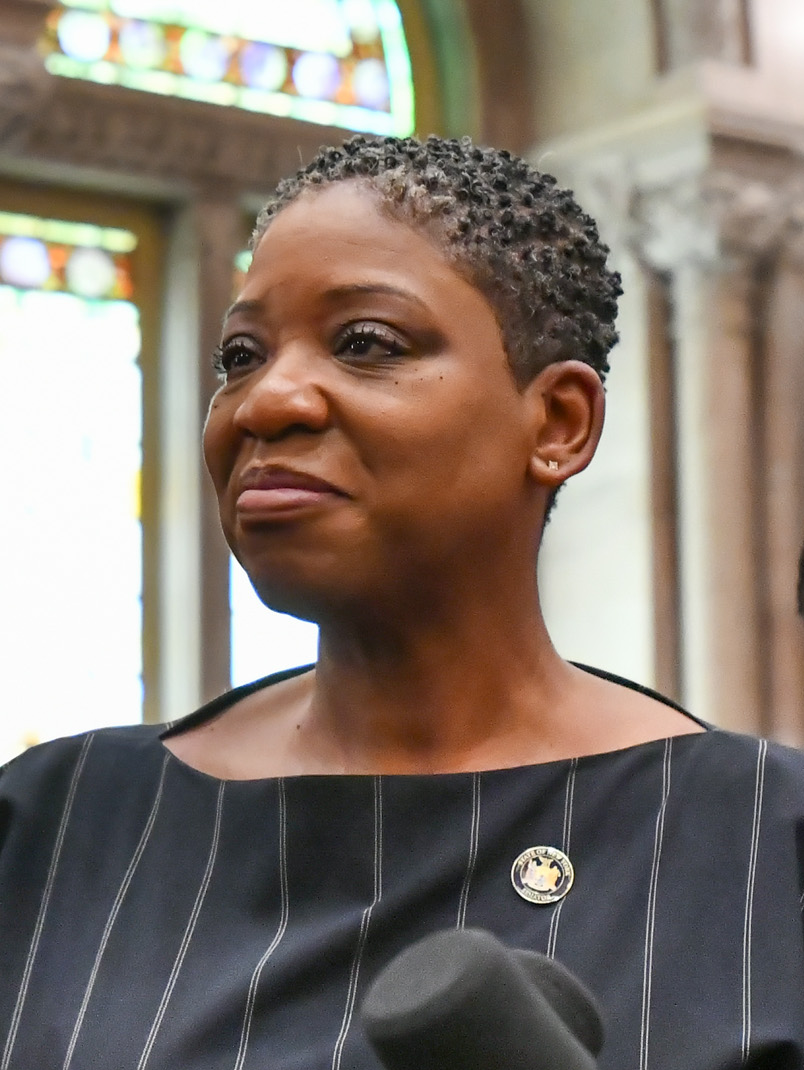

Member of the New York Senate from the 6th district
- Incumbent
- Assumed office January 1, 2025
- Preceded by: Kevin Thomas

Member of the Nassau County Legislature from the 2nd district
- In office February 2014 – December 16, 2024
- Preceded by: Robert Troiano
- Succeeded by: Olena Nicks

Personal details
- Born: 1967 or 1968 (age 57–58)
- Party: Democratic
- Relatives: Eric Evelyn (cousin)
- Education: Nassau Community College (AA); Hofstra University (BS); LIU Post (MPA)

Siela A. Bynoe (born 1967/1968) is an American politician serving as a member of the New York State Senate for the 6th district in central Nassau County on Long Island. A Democrat, she previously served in the Nassau County Legislature.

== Early life and education ==
Bynoe's parents emigrated to the United States from the Caribbean; her father is from Suriname and his great-grandfather originally from Barbados while her mother's family is from Saint Kitts and Nevis and Anguilla. The family moved from Crown Heights to Queens Village, and eventually to Long Island when she was 5.

She graduated from Westbury High School, then earned an Associate's degree in liberal arts from Nassau Community College and a Bachelor’s degree in psychology from Hofstra University. During her time working towards a Masters in Public Administration at LIU Post, Bynoe was diagnosed with breast cancer.

== Political career ==
Bynoe was elected to the Westbury Board of Education in 2010 and served two terms before being elected to the Nassau County Legislature in a special election to replace Robert Troiano in 2014.

== New York State Senate ==
Bynoe defeated New York State Assembly member Taylor Darling in the primary and defeated Republican Thomas Montefinise in the general election, becoming the first Black woman to represent the Long Island region in the Senate.
