= Betty Jean Grant =

American politician

Member of the Erie County Legislature from the 2nd district 7th district (2007-2011)
- In office 2007–2017
- Preceded by: Timothy J. Whalen
- Succeeded by: April Baskin

Chair of the Erie County Legislature
- In office 2012–2015
- Preceded by: Barbara Miller-Williams
- Succeeded by: John J. Mills

Member of the Buffalo Public Schools Board of Education from the Ferry District
- In office 2004–2007
- Preceded by: JoAnna Williams
- Succeeded by: Pamela Cahill

Member of the Buffalo Common Council from the University District
- In office 2001–2003
- Preceded by: Kevin J. Helfer
- Succeeded by: Bonnie E. Russell

Personal details
- Born: 1948 (age 77–78) Brighton, Tennessee, U.S.
- Party: Democratic
- Education: Medaille College

Betty Jean Grant is an American politician from Buffalo, New York. She served as an Erie County Legislator from 2007 until 2017, representing the 2nd district, after previously serving the 7th district.

She is currently running for county legislator in the 2025 general election as an independent candidate on the Restore Buffalo line.

== Early life and education ==
Grant was born in 1948 and raised in Brighton, Tennessee, a small rural town approximately 18 miles from Memphis. She attended Medaille College, where she earned a Bachelor of Science degree in Elementary Education, graduating Magna Cum Laude in 1993. She earned a Master of Science degree in Special Education from Buffalo State College. She has also owned a deli and worked as a school teacher.

== Career ==
Grant was elected to the Buffalo Common Council in 1999 representing the University District. She served two full terms on the Common Council. As a council member, she pushed to clean up a toxic waste site and created three Economic Empowerment Zones that drew new businesses to areas on Bailey Avenue, Kensington Avenue and Main Street.

In 2004, Betty Jean Grant was elected to the Buffalo Public School Board of Education, representing the Ferry District. She was elected to the Erie County Legislature in 2007 and was re-elected in 2009, 2011, 2013 and 2015. In 2012, she began serving as Chair of the Erie County Legislature after both her Democratic and Republican colleagues unanimously voted for her.

Grant lost by only 139 votes to Tim Kennedy in the Democratic Primary for New York State Senate District 63 in 2012. She challenged him again in 2014 in a race that drew much attention because of the dollar amounts involved, but lost again. Grant also ran in the primary for the mayor of Buffalo in 2017, making the point that there was a need for greater city investment in the East Side.

Grant served on the legislature until 2017 when she retired from public service, and April Baskin was elected that year to fill her seat.

After being denied ballot access for the 2025 Democratic primary by the Erie County Democratic Committee, Grant is running in the general election against county legislator Taisha St. Jean Tard as an independent on the Restore Buffalo line.

== Personal life ==
Though no longer an elected official, Grant remains an active community organizer through the We Are Women Warriors empowerment group and is a frequent radio guest on WUFO.

In 2018, she received the Western New York Peace Center's Lifetime Achievement Award at its 51st Annual Dinner. That same year she also received the Woman of Courage, Compassion and Commitment Award during the Buffalo & Erie County Public Library's kickoff event for Women's History Month.

She worked at the Erie County Board of Elections after her time in the Legislature.

Political offices
Preceded by Timothy J. Whalen	2nd District Erie County Legislator; 2012-2018	Succeeded by April Baskin
Preceded by Demone A. Smith	7th District Erie County Legislator; 2007-2011	Succeeded by Patrick B. Burke
