= Brian Higgins =

American politician (born 1959)

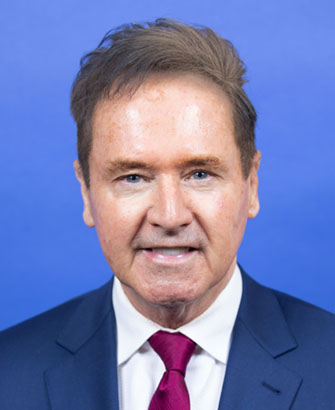
- Official portrait, 2022

Member of the U.S. House of Representatives from New York
- In office January 3, 2005 – February 2, 2024
- Preceded by: Jack Quinn
- Succeeded by: Tim Kennedy
- Constituency: 27th district (2005–2013); 26th district (2013–2024)

Member of the New York State Assembly from the 145th district
- In office January 1, 1999 – December 31, 2004
- Preceded by: Richard J. Keane
- Succeeded by: Mark J. F. Schroeder

Member of the Buffalo Common Council from the South district
- In office 1988–1993
- Preceded by: James Keane
- Succeeded by: Bonnie Kane Lockwood

Personal details
- Born: Brian Michael Higgins; October 6, 1959 (age 67) Buffalo, New York, U.S.
- Party: Democratic
- Spouse: Mary Hannon
- Children: 2
- Education: Buffalo State College (BA, MA); Harvard University (MPA)

Brian Michael Higgins (born October 6, 1959) is an American former politician who was the U.S. representative for New York's 26th congressional district, from 2005 until 2024. The district, numbered as the 27th district from 2005 to 2013 and as the 26th from 2013 to 2024, included Buffalo and Niagara Falls, along with some surrounding urban and suburban areas. Higgins is a member of the Democratic Party, and of several congressional committees and caucuses. He was born and raised Buffalo, New York, before obtaining a bachelor's and master's from Buffalo State College and an MPA from Harvard University.

== Early life, education, and career ==
Brian Higgins was born on October 6, 1959, in Buffalo, New York. A native of South Buffalo, Higgins served on the Buffalo Common Council (city council) from 1988 to 1993, representing the South District. Higgins's grandparents were from Ireland.

In 1993, during his final year on the Council, Higgins was rated "Buffalo's Best Lawmaker" in a 1993 Buffalo News Survey of Western New York business and community leaders. Responding to the survey were 158 business, community, and government leaders in Western New York. Higgins earned the highest rating of any political leader, with a 3.81 out of a possible score of 5. The Buffalo News wrote of Higgins: "During his 5 1/2 years on the Council, he has earned a reputation as a thoughtful, soft-spoken lawmaker who has paid attention to both district and citywide concerns." One community leader said, "Brian is a very bright, responsible public official", while a government leader said of Higgins, "The best Councilman in Buffalo. Has great vision."

Higgins graduated from Buffalo State College with a BA in political science in 1984 and an MA in history in 1985. He received an MPA from Harvard University's John F. Kennedy School of Government in 1996. Higgins has taught courses on state and local government, and the economic history of Buffalo and Western New York, in Buffalo State College's history and economics departments. He served as the 145th district representative to the New York State Assembly from 1999 to 2004.

== U.S. House of Representatives ==
=== Elections ===
Jack Quinn, a moderate Republican who had represented the heavily Democratic 27th since 1993, unexpectedly announced his retirement in 2004. In April 2004, Higgins entered the race, and narrowly defeated then-Erie County Comptroller Nancy Naples. After the 2000 redistricting, the district was made slightly friendlier for Quinn (in part, by adding mostly rural Chautauqua County), but was still at the time the most Democratic district in the country represented by a Republican. Since Higgins's initial election, the district has since reverted to form, and Higgins was reelected without serious difficulty, never receiving less than 60% of the vote. He easily dispatched his 2008 and 2010 opponents even after they posted six-figure fundraising numbers. In 2006 and 2008, Higgins garnered more than 70% of the vote.

For his first four terms, Higgins represented the southern two-thirds of Buffalo, as well as Chautauqua County. After the 2010 census, his district was renumbered as the 26th, and a special master redrew it to be much more compact and Democratic. He picked up the rest of Buffalo, as well as several inner-ring suburbs that used to be in the territory of Louise Slaughter, while losing Chautauqua County to its traditional Southern Tier district. He also picked up a large portion of Niagara County, including all of North Tonawanda and 99% of Niagara Falls.

Higgins has received financial contributions for his campaigns from many business executives in Western New York throughout his tenure in Congress. In 2012, his reelection committee raised more than $1,000,000, with approximately 2/3 coming from individual donors, representing major businesses in Western New York.

=== Tenure ===
Higgins has positioned himself as a centrist, although his voting record in the House has placed him close to the center of his party. In 1998, he ran for the Assembly on the Democratic and Conservative party lines, and in 2000 and 2004 he ran with both parties' endorsements, as well as that of the Working Families Party.

Higgins describes himself as a pro-union moderate who wants to spur job growth. He has said he supports allowing seniors to buy prescription drugs from Canada, and one of his priorities in Congress is legislation allowing the government to negotiate for volume discounts on drugs. He has also said he wants Congress to repeal President George W. Bush's tax cuts for the wealthiest individuals.

Higgins procured $279 million over 50 years for Erie County's various governments and agencies from the New York Power Authority as part of the Niagara Power Project 50-year relicensing agreement. He is an advocate for economic development and job creation, and played a pivotal role through his membership on the House's Transportation and Infrastructure Committee in securing approval for the construction of a new federal courthouse in downtown Buffalo.

Higgins strongly advocates for increased federal funding for cancer research, as Buffalo is home to Roswell Park Comprehensive Cancer Center, the nation's first major medical facility devoted exclusively to treating cancer, with cancer research as its main mission.

In 2006, Higgins and Representatives James T. Walsh and Tim Murphy met with several government leaders in Ireland and announced confirmation of the Irish Republican Army (IRA) weapons decommissioning. Government leaders with whom the three met included Irish Foreign Minister Dermot Ahern, Secretary of State for Northern Ireland Peter Hain, US Ambassador to Ireland James C. Kenny, US Ambassador to the United Kingdom Robert H. Tuttle, and the leadership of each of the main political parties involved in the process for peace.

Regarding Higgins' visit to Ireland in association with the peace talks, Higgins stated on his congressional website on January 20, 2006:

I was honored to represent the United States at this important moment in the Irish peace process. My colleagues and I went to Ireland and the United Kingdom to focus international intention on the stalled negotiations and to build momentum for the fulfillment of the Good Friday Accords. While we met with leaders from different nationalities, political parties, and religious faiths, each discussion was filled with hope and the common belief that lasting peace can finally reach all residents of Northern Ireland.

Higgins has also supported efforts for peace in South Asia and Africa, and the Middle East, including Iraq, Afghanistan, and Darfur.

Higgins received an "A+" on the 2007 Congressional Scorecard on middle-class issues from the Drum Major Institute, which describes itself as "providing the ideas that fuel the progressive movement."

Several media outlets named Higgins as one of the leading candidates to succeed Hillary Clinton in the United States Senate after she became Secretary of State in an Obama administration. He was one of six candidates on New York Governor David Paterson's "short list" for the position; a WKBW-TV poll showed 75% of respondents on the station's website would support Higgins's nomination. In the end, Paterson appointed Representative Kirsten Gillibrand. On January 31, 2009, Higgins led a delegation of Western New York elected leaders in welcoming Gillibrand to the region, moderating an economic roundtable discussion held at the Bioinformatics Center of Excellence, on the Buffalo Niagara Medical Campus.

In December 2008, after only two terms in the House, Higgins secured a spot on the United States House Committee on Ways and Means, considered one of the most important and powerful committees in Congress due to its wide jurisdiction. Higgins was subsequently appointed to serve on the Ways and Means Committee's subcommittee on Select Revenue Measures and its subcommittee on Oversight. After the GOP takeover of the House following the 2010 elections, Higgins left the Ways and Means Committee and became a member of the United States House Committee on Foreign Affairs and the United States House Committee on Homeland Security. On the latter, Higgins quickly rose to the position of Ranking Member of the United States House Homeland Security Subcommittee on Counterterrorism and Intelligence.

On February 2, 2024, Higgins resigned from Congress, having announced the plan three months prior on November 12. He cited his impatience with "growing dysfunction" in Congress as the reason.

=== Committee assignments ===
- United States House Committee on Ways and Means
- United States House Committee on the Budget

=== Caucus memberships ===
- Co-chair, member, House Cancer Caucus
- Co-chair, Revitalizing Older Cities Task Force
- Former co-chair, member, Great Lakes Task Force
- Former co-chair, member, House Cancer Caucus
- Former co-chair, Historic Preservation Caucus
- Former co-chair, member, Northeast-Midwest Congressional Coalition
- Former co-chair, Northern Border Caucus
- Member, House Steel Caucus
- Member, China Caucus
- Member, Arts Caucus
- Medicare for All Caucus
- Congressional Arts Caucus
- Congressional Wildlife Refuge Caucus
- Afterschool Caucuses
- Black Maternal Health Caucus
- Blue Collar Caucus
- Congressional Caucus on Turkey and Turkish Americans
- Congressional Equality Caucus

== Political positions ==
Higgins voted with President Joe Biden's stated position 100% of the time in the 117th Congress, according to a FiveThirtyEight analysis.

Self-described as an independent, Higgins is considered to be in the center of his party. He supports the strengthening of Social Security, and has been a proponent for a public option of health insurance. He further supports national and regional economic development. Higgins supports abortion rights. He has also supported efforts for peace in many areas of the world, and has been actively involved in the Northern Ireland peace process.

=== Social Security ===
On a previous policy position from his website, Higgins said: "For too long, the Social Security Administration has under-funded and under-staffed hearing offices in Western New York ... Citizens who have contributed to the Social Security system throughout their lives should have proper customer service when their benefits come due."

In 2010, Higgins and many other congressional members sent President Barack Obama a letter, encouraging him to keep Social Security and make it stronger, saying: "We write today to express our strong support for Social Security and our view that it should be strengthened. We oppose any cuts to Social Security benefits, including raising the retirement age. We also oppose any effort to privatize Social Security, in whole or in part ... Cutting Social Security benefits beyond the already scheduled increase in the retirement age from 65 to 67 would create even more needless hardship for millions of vulnerable Americans." This was in response to Obama giving the task of cutting government spending to the National Commission on Fiscal Responsibility and Reform on October 15, 2010. The letter also stressed that Social Security is "prohibited by law from adding to the national budget deficit".

Higgins opposes privatizing Social Security. He "support[s] full funding for the Social Security Administration to process checks on time; fight against waste, fraud, and abuse; and combat unacceptable claims backlogs". His district includes nearly 150,000 senior citizens. Higgins introduced related legislation, House Resolution (HR) 3997, in February 2014. The bill aims requires the Social Security Commissioner to submit an estimated annual budget, and to submit the estimated budget to Congress before submitting it to the President; prohibits the closing or limitation of field offices and hearing offices without justification; and mandates particular procedures related to closings, consolidations, and/or public limitations.

=== Abortion ===
In the New York State Assembly from 1999 to 2002, Higgins supported certain anti-abortion measures, but since 2003, he has identified himself as pro-choice. In 2006, Higgins was given a rating of 9% by the NRLC, which indicates a pro-choice stance. Higgins received a score of 100% (a perfect score) from Planned Parenthood in 2012, and from NARAL Pro-Choice America in 2011.

=== Health care ===
Higgins voted for the Affordable Care Act, also known as "ObamaCare". In June 2012, Higgins said he believed that health care providers will have to embrace "Accountable Care Organizations, comparative effectiveness research — which studies various treatments to determine what works best — and other changes". He believed that this should have been done decades ago.

On his congressional website, Higgins has stated that "there is no question that [the Patient Protection and Affordable Care Act] was needed". He added that it is a beginning of health care reform in the United States.

Higgins strongly believes in a national health care program, with a "public option", whereby the government provides health insurance that would compete with other businesses' plans. A letter Higgins signed from a group of representatives to Senator Harry Reid, then the Senate Majority Leader, stated: "As the Senate continues to work on health reform legislation, we strongly urge you to consider including a public option." The American Public Health Association gave Higgins a perfect rating of 100% in 2009.

=== Stimulus spending ===
It was reported that Higgins was "proposing something unprecedented in this era of $1.3 trillion annual deficits: a $1.25 trillion, five-year plan to rebuild the nation's roads, bridges, railroads, ports, and airports". Higgins's website gives the cost of these endeavors as $1.2 trillion. The bill, the Nation Building Here at Home Act, based on research by the New America Foundation, would cost significantly more than Obama's $787 billion stimulus package. Higgins said that he wants to rebuild the US, "as we've rebuilt other countries — Iraq and Afghanistan — in recent years". He also said that it is not a stimulus bill, but a "nation-building bill".

=== Education ===
Higgins is a supporter of education, including early education through higher education. He has said, "Every child has a right to a quality education." Ensuring that young people have a quality early education, and that legislators are supportive of education for individuals in primary, elementary, secondary, and higher educational institutions, are among Higgins's aims. He is a proponent of congressional support for measures that increase student achievement, but that also reward success, rather than punish failure, as the No Child Left Behind Act has done. Higgins further believes that financial barriers to education should not hinder anyone from pursuing higher education.

=== Student loan interest rates ===
Higgins supports maintaining lower interest rates on loans incurred by college and university students. He co-sponsored two bills — H.R. 3826, and H.R. 4816 — in efforts to extend the period of time in maintaining the reduced 3.4% interest rate on student loans. In 2007, Higgins supported The College Cost Reduction and Access Act, a bill passed into law that included the reduced 3.4% interest rate on subsidized Stafford student loans through the end of the 2012 academic year.

=== Syria ===
In 2023, Higgins was among 56 Democrats to vote in favor of H.Con.Res. 21, which directed President Joe Biden to remove U.S. troops from Syria within 180 days.

== Personal life ==
Higgins resides in South Buffalo, New York. He has two adult children, John and Maeve.

== See also ==
- List of Harvard University politicians

U.S. House of Representatives
Preceded by Jack Quinn	Member of the U.S. House of Representatives from New York's 27th congressional district 2005–2013	Succeeded by Chris Collins
Preceded by Kathy Hochul	Member of the U.S. House of Representatives from New York's 26th congressional district 2013–2024	Succeeded by Tim Kennedy
U.S. order of precedence (ceremonial)
Preceded by Matthew F. McHugh as Former U.S. Representative	Order of precedence of the United States as Former U.S. Representative	Succeeded by Sue Myrick as Former U.S. Representative
