= Tim Kennedy (politician) =

American politician (born 1976)

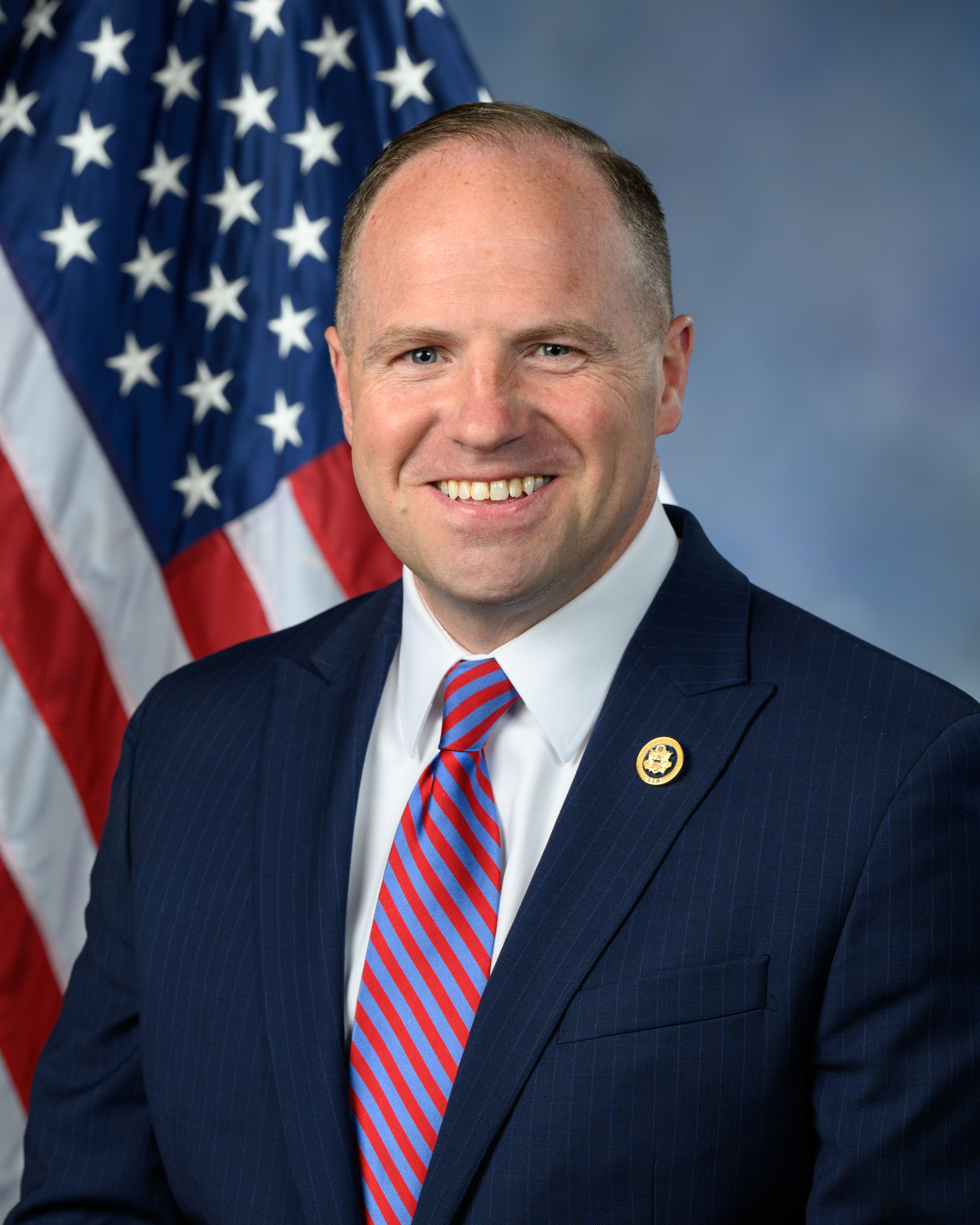
- Official portrait, 2024

Member of the U.S. House of Representatives from New York's 26th district
- Incumbent
- Assumed office April 30, 2024 (Note: Kennedy's official service begins on the date of the special election, while he was not sworn in until May 6, 2024.)
- Preceded by: Brian Higgins

Member of the New York State Senate
- In office January 1, 2011 – May 6, 2024
- Preceded by: William Stachowski
- Succeeded by: April Baskin
- Constituency: 58th district (2011–2013); 63rd district (2013–2024)

Personal details
- Born: Timothy Martin Kennedy; October 20, 1976 (age 49) Buffalo, New York, U.S.
- Party: Democratic
- Spouse: Katie Kennedy
- Children: 3
- Education: D'Youville University (BS, MS)
- Website: House website Campaign website

Timothy Martin Kennedy (born October 20, 1976) is an American politician who is the U.S. representative for New York's 26th congressional district. A member of the Democratic Party, he was elected in the April 2024 special election to finish the remainder of Brian Higgins' term in the 118th United States Congress. Prior to his congressional tenure, Kennedy served in the New York State Senate from 2011 to 2024.

== Early life and education ==
Kennedy was raised in South Buffalo, one of five children of Martin F. and Mary Kennedy. His father worked as Buffalo's commissioner of assessment and taxation, and his mother is a retired nurse who taught nursing at D'Youville University. He received his early education at St. Martin's Elementary School, and attended St. Joseph's Collegiate Institute. He earned a bachelor's degree and a master's degree in occupational therapy from D'Youville University.

== Early career ==
From 1999 to 2010, Kennedy worked as a licensed occupational therapist at Catholic Health.

=== Erie County Legislature ===
In late 2004, at the age of 28, Kennedy was appointed to the Erie County Legislature, representing the 2nd district, after Mark J. F. Schroeder was elected to the State Assembly.

In 2005, Kennedy defeated Democratic primary opponent Paul Sullivan by a vote of 65% to 35%. He won 72% of the vote in the general election against his Republican opponent, Julieanne Mazurkiewicz.

In 2007, Kennedy ran unopposed for a second full term to the Erie County Legislature.

=== New York State Senate ===
==== Elections ====
===== 2010 =====
In 2010, Kennedy challenged incumbent William Stachowski for the Democratic nomination for the 58th district in the New York State Senate. Kennedy also earned the endorsement of the Conservative Party, which had previously supported Stachowski. Stachowski was one of eight Democratic state senators who had voted against a bill allowing same-sex marriage in New York, while Kennedy supported it, earning him the backing of gay rights organizations in the primary. Kennedy ultimately defeated Stachowski by a margin of 63% to 26%. amid a wave of anti-incumbent voter sentiment. Stachowski remained on the ballot on the Independence Party and Working Families Party lines.

In the 2010 general election, Kennedy defeated Republican Assemblyman Jack Quinn III, gaining 47% of the vote to Quinn's 45%. The remaining votes went to Stachowski.

===== 2012 =====
Seeking reelection in 2012, Kennedy won a primary challenge from Democrat Betty Jean Grant, prevailing by 156 votes. The closeness of the election prompted a protracted court battle heard by Justice Joseph R. Glownia of the State Supreme Court. Kennedy ran uncontested in the November 2012 general election and was re-elected.

===== 2014 =====
In 2014, Kennedy defeated Grant in a Democratic primary rematch, receiving 16,660 votes (60.2%) to Grant's 10,997 votes (39.8%). The race received much attention, with campaign spending by the candidates and outside groups surpassing $1 million. Kennedy received the backing of the New York State United Teachers and realtors, while Grant received the Erie County Democratic Committee endorsement and help from the Independent Democratic Conference, a breakaway group of state Senate Democrats who sided with Republicans in the Senate. Kennedy's base of support was South Buffalo, Lackawanna, and Cheektowaga, while Grant's base of support was Buffalo's East Side.

In the November 2014 general election, Kennedy (who ran on the Democratic, Working Families, and Independence ballot lines) defeated Ricky T. Donovan, Sr. (who ran on the Republican and Conservative ballot lines). Out of 59,094 total votes, Kennedy received 42,278 (71.5%), while Donovan received 11,973 (20.3%).

===== 2016 =====
In the 2016 general election, Kennedy ran unopposed on the Democratic, Working Families, Independence, and Women's Equality ballot lines and received 89,650 votes.

===== 2018 =====
In 2018, Kennedy defeated Shaqurah Zachery in a Democratic primary, winning 23,640 (76.6%) of the vote. He ran unopposed in the general election.

==== Tenure ====
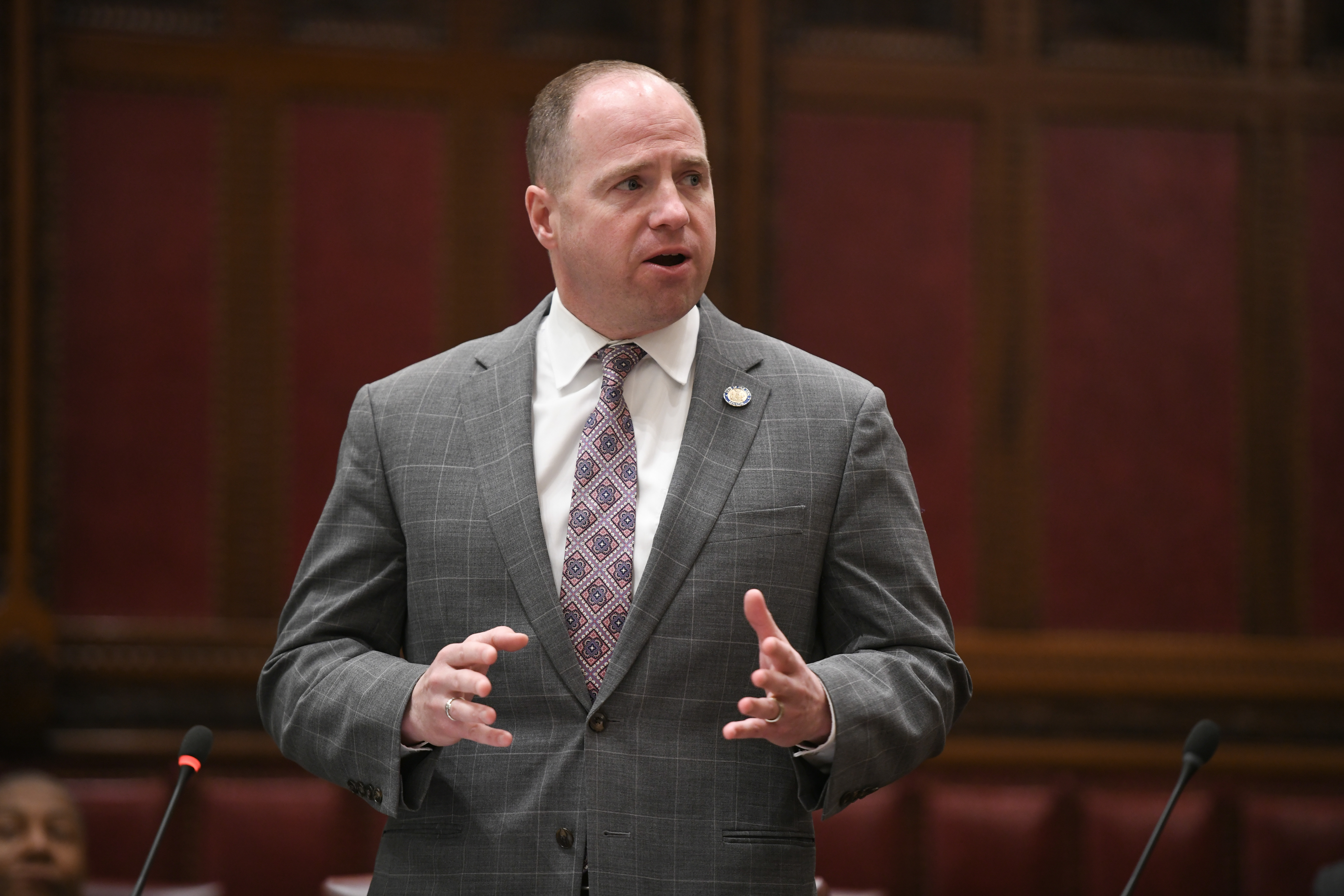
Kennedy speaking on a resolution to remember the victims of the 2022 Buffalo shooting on May 10, 2023

2011–2018

In 2011, Kennedy voted in favor of the Marriage Equality Act, which legalized same-sex marriage in New York. Kennedy lost the support of the Conservative Party in 2012 following his vote on the marriage issue.

Also in 2011, Kennedy authored Jay-J's Law, which sought to stiffen penalties for repeat child abusers by increasing the look back period in which someone can be charged with aggravated assault. The bill was named after Jay-J Bolvin, a young boy who suffered 11 fractured bones, a severe seizure disorder and developmental delays as a result of a severe beating from his father, who had previously been convicted of assaulting one of his other sons. The bill was passed by the legislature and later signed into law by Governor Andrew Cuomo in July 2013.

In 2012, Kennedy introduced a package of four bills to combat the opioid epidemic in New York. One of the bills would create a prescription-monitoring system for physicians and pharmacists to track the prescription of narcotic painkillers. This proposal was made by New York State Attorney General Eric Schneiderman.

Kennedy ran for State Senate in 2010 as a pro-life candidate. In 2013, Kennedy cast a procedural vote for the tenth point of Gov. Andrew Cuomo's Women's Equality Act, which would have expanded abortion rights in New York. In February 2014, Kennedy acknowledged that his position on abortion had "evolved" and that he supported the tenth point of the Women's Equality Act; he added, "'I believe at the end of the day that a woman has to be able to make a decision upon her health, her life and her family that is in her best interests and their best interests'". Pro-choice groups praised his shift on the issue, while Bishop Richard Malone of the Buffalo diocese of the Roman Catholic Church criticized him for it. In 2019, Kennedy voted in favor of the Reproductive Health Act, which was described by The Buffalo News as "the most sweeping set of protections to the state’s abortion laws in 49 years".

In 2013, Kennedy co-sponsored legislation to increase the state minimum wage to $9 an hour, and automatically adjust the minimum wage to account for cost-of-living increases.

In May 2013, Kennedy introduced a Jackie's Law into the Senate, which was prompted by the death of West Seneca woman Jackie Wisniewski, who was killed after being stalked by a former boyfriend using a GPS tracking device on her car. Kennedy's bill updated New York's stalking statutes by allowing police to pursue criminal charges against those who use electronic tracking devices to stalk victims. Assemblywoman Crystal Peoples-Stokes sponsored companion legislation in the Assembly. Governor Andrew Cuomo signed the bill into law in July 2014.

In 2014, Kennedy introduced legislation that would limit the state's legal immunity for claims for damages. The legislation would specifically amend Section 58 of the State Highway Law, which immunizes the state from "liability for damages arising from defects in its highways" during cold-weather months. The bill proposed by Kennedy "would allow motorists to seek damages from the state for 'egregious or unreasonable' defects year-round or when it was given prior notice of a defect." State Assemblyman Thomas J. Abinanti filed companion legislation in the State Assembly.

Kennedy has been a supporter of the legalization of mixed martial arts (MMA) in New York, which at the time was the only U.S. state to bar MMA events. Kennedy argued that MMA could economically benefit Western New York, with events at First Niagara Center in Buffalo benefiting local businesses. The legal status of MMA had been a state political issue for years; the state Senate passed legalization legislation seven times over six years, but the bills were not taken up by the State Assembly. Kennedy expressed disappointment at the failure to pass the legislation in 2015, and welcomed passage of MMA legislation in 2016.

In 2017, Kennedy supported legalizing vehicle for hire companies in all areas of New York State.

2019−2024

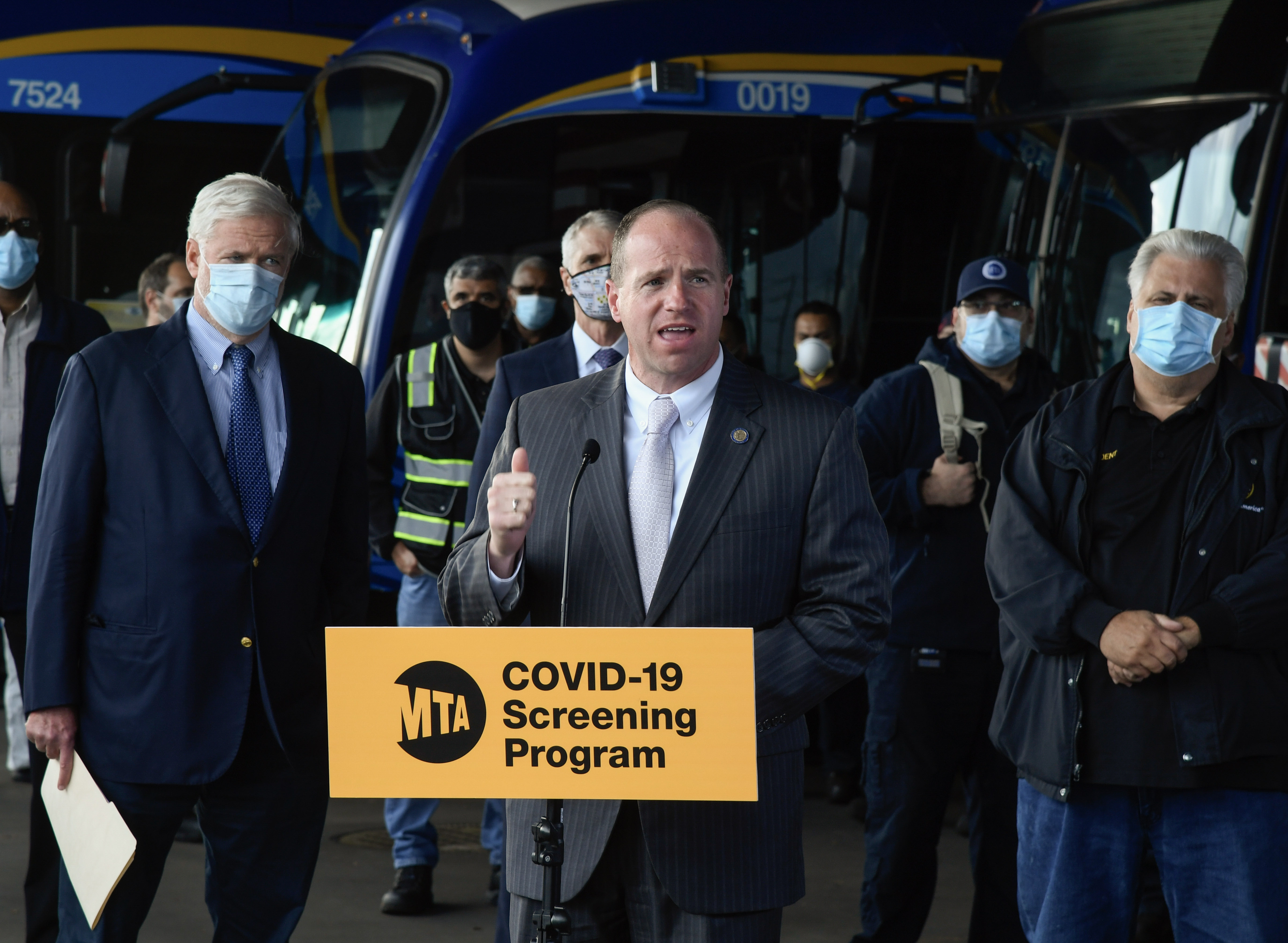
Kennedy speaking at the launch of voluntary COVID-19 screening program for MTA employees on October 27, 2020

When the Democratic Party won the majority in the State Senate in 2018, Kennedy was appointed chair of the New York State Senate Transportation, Infrastructure, and Capital Investment Committee. He also served on the Finance, Rules, Energy & Telecommunications, Insurance, Banks, and Social Services Committees.

In his first year chairing of the Senate Transportation Committee, Kennedy secured $100 million for the Niagara Frontier Transportation Authority (NFTA) Buffalo Metro Rail System. Kennedy was one of the main players in getting a new Amtrak Buffalo–Exchange Street station built.

In 2019, Kennedy convened a Transportation Committee hearing about Limousine Safety, where families of victims of the Schoharie County and Suffolk County limousine crashes testified. Subsequently, the New York State Senate passed a package of bills designed to improve bus and limousine safety.

Also in his first year as chairman of the Transportation Committee, Kennedy authored legislation that became law allowing school districts to install cameras on the back of school buses to catch vehicles illegally and dangerously passing stopped buses.

During his tenure as Transportation Committee chair, he secured historic investments in local roads and bridges, through the CHIPS, PAVE NY and BRIDGE NY programs.

In 2020, Kennedy passed legislation that became law to allow striking workers to collect unemployment insurance after two weeks, when striking workers previously had to wait seven weeks prior to filing for unemployment.

In 2022, after the racist shooting at Tops grocery store in Buffalo, Kennedy supported a "landmark legislative package to immediately strengthen the state's gun laws, close critical loopholes exposed by shooters in Buffalo and Uvalde and protect New Yorkers from the scourge of gun violence that continues to infect our nation and endanger our communities."

== U.S. House of Representatives ==
=== 2024 special election ===
On November 14, 2023, Kennedy announced that he would run for the soon-to-be vacated congressional seat held at the time by Brian Higgins. He won the election on April 30, 2024, defeating Republican nominee Gary Dickson. Kennedy received 68.6% of the vote to Dickson's 31.3%.

=== 2024 ===
Kennedy was sworn into the U.S. House of Representatives on May 6, 2024.

The first bill Kennedy cosponsored was H.R. 2530, the Nurse Staffing Standards for Patient Safety and Quality Care Act. In his first floor speech, he highlighted the need for safe staffing nurse-to-patient ratios.

On the second anniversary of the racist shooting at Tops grocery store in Buffalo, Kennedy honored the victims in a 30-minute special order proceeding where he was joined by Rep. Jim Clyburn. He also introduced legislation with Rep. Grace Meng to ban the sale of enhanced body armor, which was used by the shooter in Buffalo.

=== 2025 ===
Kennedy voted to table the articles of impeachment introduced by Rep. Al Green against president Donald Trump on June 24, 2025.

=== Committee assignments ===
For the 119th Congress:

- Committee on Homeland Security
  - Subcommittee on Emergency Management and Technology (Ranking Member)
- Committee on Veterans Affairs
  - Subcommittee on Economic Opportunity
  - Subcommittee on Oversight and Investigations

=== Caucus memberships ===
- Congressional Equality Caucus
- Future Forum
- New Democrat Coalition
- Congressional Ukraine Caucus
- Labor Caucus
- House Baltic Caucus

== Personal life ==
Kennedy lives in Buffalo with his wife Katie and their three children.

He is Roman Catholic and has Irish heritage.

== Electoral history ==
2024 New York's 26th congressional district special election
Party	Candidate	Votes	%	±%
Democratic	Tim Kennedy	44,411	62.60%	+4.80
Working Families	Tim Kennedy	3,639	5.13%	−0.97
Total	Tim Kennedy	48,050	67.73%	+3.83
Republican	Gary Dickson	16,859	23.76%	−4.94
Conservative	Gary Dickson	5,123	7.22%	−0.08
Total	Gary Dickson	21,982	30.98%	−5.02
Write-in		159	0.22%	+0.12
Total votes		70,946	100.0%	
Democratic hold				

2024 New York's 26th congressional district general election
Party	Candidate	Votes	%
Democratic	Tim Kennedy	190,668	59.4
Working Families	Tim Kennedy	18,463	5.8
Total	Tim Kennedy (incumbent)	209,131	65.2
Republican	Anthony Marecki	95,035	29.6
Conservative	Anthony Marecki	16,737	5.2
Total	Anthony Marecki	111,772	34.8
Total votes		320,903	100.0
Democratic hold			

U.S. House of Representatives
Preceded by Brian Higgins	Member of the U.S. House of Representatives from New York's 26th congressional district 2024–present	Incumbent
U.S. order of precedence (ceremonial)
Preceded by Celeste Maloy	United States representatives by seniority 358th	Succeeded by Vince Fong
