= Marshall Wittmann =

American writer

Marshall Wittmann (born 1953) is an American lobbyist and the chief spokesman for AIPAC.

On November 22, 2006, he was hired to be the communications director and spokesman for Senator Joe Lieberman (I-CT). Wittmann is a former senior fellow at the Progressive Policy Institute, a think tank affiliated with the Democratic Leadership Council. In 2012, he became the chief spokesman for AIPAC.

== Political career ==
Wittmann was born in 1953 in Waco, Texas. He studied at New York University and obtained a Bachelor in Elementary Education from the University Michigan in 1975 and a master's degree.

He served as the conservative Heritage Foundation's director of congressional relations, the Christian Coalition's director of legislative affairs, and as a senior fellow at the conservative Hudson Institute for two years from September 2000 to October 2002. In the George H. W. Bush administration, he served as a deputy assistant secretary at the Department of Health and Human Services. Wittmann also was the legislative representative with the National Association of Retired Federal Employees, which seeks to protect and enhance the earned pay, retirement, and health care benefits of U.S. federal government employees, retirees, and their survivors and a public affairs specialist with the National Treasury Employees Union, which fights for fair pay and benefits, improved working conditions, and other issues that impact the working lives of federal employees.

He became a spokesman for AIPAC in September 2012.

== Bull Moose Blog ==
In his blog, Bull Moose Blog, Wittmann refers to himself in third-person as "the Moose". For example, he writes "The Moose has enjoyed the distinct pleasure of being labeled both a Republican squish and a Rovian Plant". Wittmann borrowed his nickname from Teddy Roosevelt, whom Wittmann admires.

He retired his blog on November 17, 2006, and five days later, he was named the new Director of Communications for Senator Joseph Lieberman. His new role comes after a bitter campaign for the junior Senate seat in Connecticut where Lieberman defeated Ned Lamont; Wittmann was Lieberman's most prominent blog supporter and argued that Lamont's supporters were from the "nutroots".

== Political stances ==
Wittmann has changed his political party affiliation and modified his political philosophy. Wittmann describes himself as a member of the "McCainiac wing of the Democratic Party". "McCainiac" refers to senator John McCain, the Republican for whom Wittmann once worked for as a communications director and advisor. According to a 2004 The New York Sun article, Wittmann is a neo-conservative and social conservative who "worship[s]" McCain but split with the Republican Party to support John Kerry's candidacy for president and join the Progressive Policy Institute because of his split with the GOP over tax cuts. He called the Bush tax cuts in a time of war "frivolous and obscene" and said the Bush administration must give more support to poor families.

Though the Progressive Policy Institute is a Democratic institution, both the organization and Wittmann have been criticized by some left-wing progressives because of his defenses of the War on Terror and attacks on the far left. When President Bush's warrantless surveillance program was revealed, Wittmann dismissed concerns about its impact on civil liberties as "fevered imaginations of graying baby boomers and twenty-something bloggers" and opined that "The Democratic Party is increasingly under the influence of modern day McGovernites". Furthermore, Wittmann has claimed that vocal critics of President Bush constitute a "left wing Cult of Bush Hatred" because "in the left wing universe, one must oppose everything the President supports." During the final days of the Lieberman-Lamont Primary Election, Marshall not only suggested that detractors of DLC member Joe Lieberman were hateful, left-wing fanatics, but also argued that some supporters of Ned Lamont were motivated by anti-Semitism.

Glenn Greenwald writing at Salon.com said that "the unabashed and undiluted use of anti-Semitism accusations as a partisan tool to win elections" was a new low for Marshall Wittmann and labeled it as "the basest and most divisive tactics of identity politics and religious tribalism".

Wittmann has also been critical of the Republican leadership: "Republicans are about as serious about fiscal responsibility as Paris Hilton is about modesty," Wittmann said, according to The Washington Post on January 4, 2006.

During the 2021 Israel–Palestine crisis, he said "We appreciate the steadfast support from President Biden and his administration for Israel’s efforts to defeat terrorism," acknowledging Biden's support for Israel.
