= Kevin Thomas (politician) =

American attorney and politician

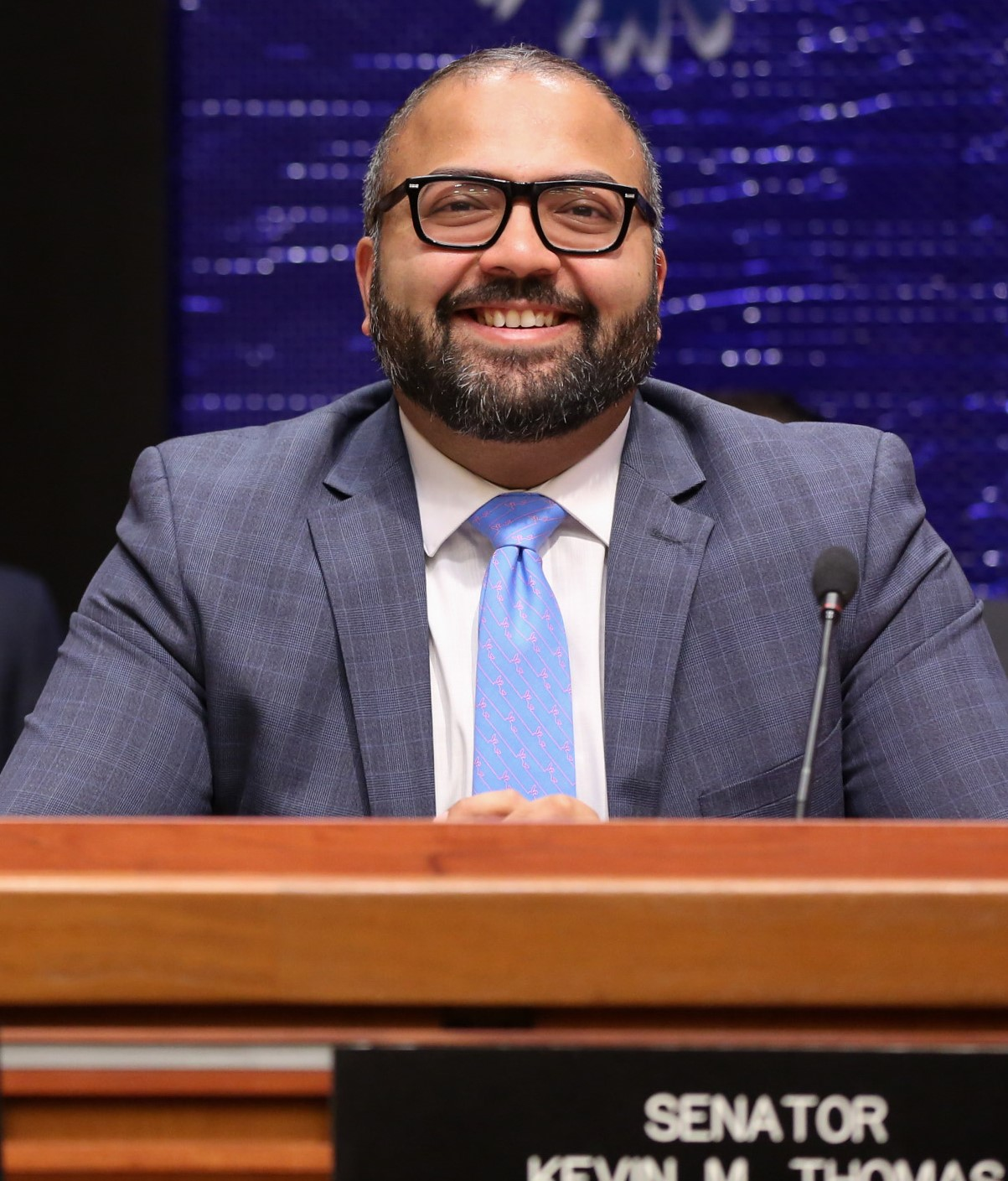
- Thomas in 2019

Member of the New York State Senate from the 6th district
- In office January 1, 2019 – December 31, 2024
- Preceded by: Kemp Hannon
- Succeeded by: Siela Bynoe

Personal details
- Born: Dubai, United Arab Emirates
- Party: Democratic
- Profession: Attorney
- Website: Official website

Kevin Thomas is an American attorney and politician from the state of New York. A Democrat, Thomas represented the 6th district in the New York State Senate from 2019 until 2024. In July 2023, he announced his candidacy in the 2024 election for New York's 4th congressional district.

== Early life and career ==
Thomas is an Indian-American of Malayali descent. He was born in Satwa, Dubai, United Arab Emirates, to a family originating from Kerala. He has an older sister. Thomas attended St. Mary's School in Dubai before he immigrated to the United States as a ten-year-old boy. He earned his bachelor's degree from St. John's University and his Juris Doctor from Western Michigan University's Cooley Law School.

Thomas worked for the New York Legal Assistance Group as an attorney and was an appointee of the US Commission on Civil Rights to the New York State Advisory Committee, a federal agency tasked with civil rights oversight.

== New York Senate ==
In an upset victory, Thomas defeated incumbent Senator Kemp Hannon 50.8%–49.1% in the 6th Senate District in the 2018 New York State Senate elections.

Thomas was sworn in for his first term on January 1, 2019, and is serving as Chair of the Consumer Protection committee. He is the first South Asian American and the first Indian-American to serve in the New York State Senate.

In 2020, Thomas worked on a data bill entitled the New York Privacy Act, which would require companies to allow consumers to obtain the names of all entities with whom their information is shared and give those consumers the power to stop the company from sharing that data if they do not want it distributed.

In October 2020, Thomas secured a second term after defeating Republican challenger Dennis Dunne.

In 2024, Thomas was "mapped out" or prevented from running for his State Senate seat because he was redistricted into another district. He was planning to run for the House of Representatives, but decided against running for the House in the last minute. He endorsed Laura Gillen for the House seat.Siela Bynoe replaces Kevin Thomas as New York State Senator of the new 6th New York State Senate district.

== Personal life ==
Thomas and his wife, Rincy, have a daughter.
