= New York's 58th State Senate district =

American legislative district

Senator
Tom O'Mara; R–Big Flats
- Registration: 38.6% Republican; 33.6% Democratic; 20.1% No party preference
- Demographics: 87% White; 3% Black; 3% Hispanic; 4% Asian
- Population (2017): 292,701
- Registered voters: 173,742

New York's 58th State Senate district is one of 63 districts in the New York State Senate. It has been represented by Republican Tom O'Mara, under different district numbers and lines, since 2011.

== Geography ==
District 58 covers some or all of 5 counties in Western New York along the Pennsylvania border: Chemung, Schuyler, Steuben, Tompkins, and Yates, incorporating, for example, the cities of Corning, Elmira, Watkins Glen, and Seneca. It no longer includes Ithaca.

The district is located entirely within New York's 19th and 23rd congressional district, and overlaps with the 124th, 125th, 132nd, 133rd, and 148th districts of the New York State Assembly.

== Recent election results ==
=== 2026 ===
2026 New York State Senate election, District 58
Party	Candidate	Votes	%
Republican	Tom O'Mara		
Conservative	Tom O'Mara		
Total	Tom O'Mara (incumbent)		
Democratic	James Bobreski		
Write-in			
Total votes			

=== 2024 ===
2024 New York State Senate election, District 58
Party	Candidate	Votes	%
Republican	Tom O'Mara	99,495	
Conservative	Tom O'Mara	15,319	
Total	Tom O'Mara (incumbent)	114,814	99.2
Write-in		897	0.8
Total votes		115,711	100.0
Republican hold			

=== 2022 ===
2022 New York State Senate election, District 58
Party	Candidate	Votes	%
Republican	Tom O'Mara	79,820	
Conservative	Tom O'Mara	10,532	
Total	Tom O'Mara (incumbent)	90,352	99.3
Write-in		627	0.7
Total votes		90,979	100.0
Republican hold			

=== 2020 ===
2020 New York State Senate election, District 58
Party	Candidate	Votes	%
Republican	Tom O'Mara	63,815	
Conservative	Tom O'Mara	5,436	
Independence	Tom O'Mara	1,597	
Total	Tom O'Mara (incumbent)	70,848	56.3
Democratic	Leslie Danks Burke	48,193	
Working Families	Leslie Danks Burke	6,499	
SAM	Leslie Danks Burke	284	
Total	Leslie Danks Burke	54,976	43.7
Write-in		15	0.7
Total votes		125,839	100.0
Republican hold			

=== 2018 ===
2018 New York State Senate election, District 58
Primary election
Party	Candidate	Votes	%
Democratic	Amanda Kirschgessner	8,575	61.5
Democratic	Michael Lausell	5,375	38.5
Write-in		0	0.0
Total votes		13,950	100.0
General election
Republican	Tom O'Mara	51,769	
Conservative	Tom O'Mara	4,565	
Independence	Tom O'Mara	1,813	
Reform	Tom O'Mara	340	
Total	Tom O'Mara (incumbent)	58,487	59.2
Democratic	Amanda Kirschgessner	36,546	
Working Families	Amanda Kirschgessner	3,268	
Total	Amanda Kirschgessner	39,814	40.3
Write-in		452	0.5
Total votes		98,753	100.0
Republican hold			

=== 2016 ===
2016 New York State Senate election, District 58
Party	Candidate	Votes	%
Republican	Tom O'Mara	55,399	
Conservative	Tom O'Mara	5,500	
Independence	Tom O'Mara	2,067	
Reform	Tom O'Mara	304	
Total	Tom O'Mara (incumbent)	63,270	54.7
Democratic	Leslie Danks Burke	45,863	
Working Families	Leslie Danks Burke	5,380	
Women's Equality	Leslie Danks Burke	1,245	
Total	Leslie Danks Burke	52,488	45.3
Write-in		36	0.0
Total votes		115,794	100.0
Republican hold			

=== 2014 ===
2014 New York State Senate election, District 58
Party	Candidate	Votes	%
Republican	Tom O'Mara	45,375	
Conservative	Tom O'Mara	6,030	
Independence	Tom O'Mara	5,400	
Total	Tom O'Mara (incumbent)	56,805	99.4
Write-in		346	0.6
Total votes		57,151	100.0
Republican hold			

=== 2012 ===
2012 New York State Senate election, District 58
Party	Candidate	Votes	%
Republican	Tom O'Mara	59,417	
Independence	Tom O'Mara	8,566	
Conservative	Tom O'Mara	6,475	
Total	Tom O'Mara (incumbent)	74,458	99.8
Write-in		153	0.2
Total votes		74,611	100.0
Republican hold			

=== Federal results in District 58 ===
Year	Office	Results
2020	President	Trump 51.6 – 46.3%
2016	President	Trump 51.6 – 42.7%
2012	President	Obama 50.7 – 47.2%
2012	Senate	Gillibrand 61.5 – 36.6%
