= Duchin =

Duchin is a surname. It is the surname of:

- Arkadi Duchin (born 1963), Israeli singer-songwriter and musical producer
- Eddy Duchin (1909–1951), American pianist and bandleader, father of Peter
- Faye Duchin (born 1944), American computer scientist and economist
- Moon Duchin, American mathematician
- Peter Duchin (born 1937), American pianist and bandleader, son of Eddy
