= Susan Zhuang =

American politician

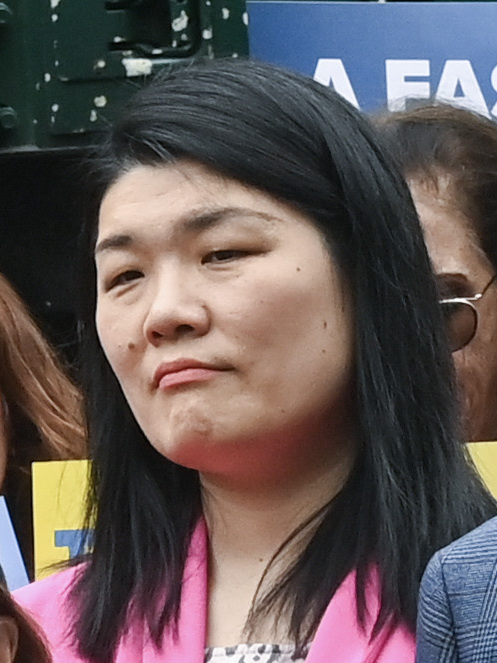
- Zhuang in 2025

Member of the New York City Council from the 43rd district
- Incumbent
- Assumed office January 1, 2024
- Preceded by: Justin Brannan (redistricting)

Personal details
- Born: January 30, 1986 (age 40) Baipu, Jiangsu, China
- Party: Democratic
- Education: State University of New York at Oswego (BS); University of Southern Indiana (MBA)
- Website: Official website Campaign website (Archived)

Susan Zhuang (Chinese: 莊文怡; pinyin: Zhuāng Wényí) is an American politician who is a member of the New York City Council for the 43rd district in Brooklyn, which covers Sunset Park, Dyker Heights, Bensonhurst, Bath Beach, Gravesend, Borough Park, and other neighborhoods in South Brooklyn.

== Early life and education ==
Zhuang was born in Baipu, China, and came to the United States in 2007 as a student. She earned a bachelor's degree in finance from the State University of New York at Oswego and later a Master of Business Administration from the University of Southern Indiana.

== Career ==
Zhuang previously worked as chief of staff for New York State Assemblyman William Colton.

=== New York City Council ===
Zhuang announced her campaign for the 43rd district, a newly created Asian-majority seat. While campaigning, Zhuang told a voter in Mandarin that her ideas aligned with the Republican Party and that she was running as a Democrat out of convenience. In 2023, she beat Wai-Yee Chan in the Democratic primary election, accusing the candidate of "supporting violent Hong Kong independence" due to past social media post about the 2019–2020 Hong Kong protests. Zhuang's election marked the first time the area had been represented by Asian Americans in both chambers of the New York State Legislature as well as the New York City Council; though policy and political differences between New York State Senator Iwen Chu, Republican Assemblyman Lester Chang, and Zhuang persist. In office, Zhuang has been described as a conservative Democrat. According to The New York Times, since being elected, Zhuang has appeared at events alongside officials of the Consulate General of China, New York over 30 times.

New York Daily News reported that in February 2024, Zhuang used her official government email account to solicit money, in a potential violation of state ethics laws, for a local united front group called Asian American Community Empowerment, which goes by the acronym BRACE.

In December 2024, Zhuang voted against the City of Yes legislation that will allow the construction and conversion of 80,000 legal and new housing units across the city. It awaits Mayor Adams' signature. Some community boards in Brooklyn voted against this new zoning proposal that was modified from the original proposal of Mayor Adams.

Zhuang did not attend a February 2025 meeting between the council's Common Sense caucus and border czar Tom Homan, telling City & State that "I’m an immigrant – I cannot abandon my own community. It’s very different from the other council members, even in the Common Sense Caucus... The good people should stay. We cannot deport everyone. This is going crazy right now."

In an August 2025 investigative report, The New York Times noted that more than a dozen overseas Chinese hometown associations—several with tax-exempt nonprofit status and ties to the government of the People's Republic of China—hosted a fund-raising dinner in January 2025 that raised over $20,000 for Zhuang's re-election campaign. According to the Times, Zhuang has since appeared at dozens of events with Chinese diplomatic officials. As a council member, she has allocated more than $300,000 in city funds to Chinese American hometown associations that supported her, many with close connections to Beijing.

==== 2024 protest and biting incident ====
In March 2024, Zhuang and Colton led a large protest against a proposed homeless shelter location in Bensonhurst. On July 17, 2024, Zhuang was arrested and charged with biting New York City Police Department Deputy Chief Frank DiGiacomo during a protest against a homeless shelter. She was released without bond that same day. In an interview a week later, she claimed to have protected an elderly woman who fell amid the chaos. BRACE subsequently organized a protest march across the Brooklyn Bridge in support of Zhuang.

In April 2025, criminal charges of biting a police officer were dropped after Zhuang completed a course in restorative justice.

Despite the charges being dropped after Zhuang completed a course in restorative justice, Deputy Chief Frank DiGiacomo proceeded with a civil lawsuit that accused Zhuang of negligence, causing DiGiacomo permanent injury, and trauma and distress. Months later, it was reported that DiGiacomo was, allegedly, still in disbelief about the incident and angry that Zhuang was painting herself as a victim. While Zhuang claimed that DiGiacomo was choking her when she bit him, DiGiacomo claimed that his arm was resting on a crowd barrier when the incident occurred. At the time of the original incident the President of the Police Benevolent Association of the City of New York, Patrick Hendry, released a statement on Twitter saying, "We are extremely shocked by the reported violence against NYPD members at today's protest in Brooklyn, especially because Councilmember Susan Zhuang has been a steadfast supporter of police officers during her time in the Council. There is never any excuse or justification for assaulting a police officer. There should be no double standard in this case. After a full and fair investigation, Councilmember Zhuang and anyone else involved must face full accountability for their conduct."

== Electoral history ==
=== 2025 ===
2025 New York City Council election, District 43
Party	Candidate	Votes	%
Democratic	Susan Zhuang	13,194	76.2
Conservative	Susan Zhuang	3,868	22.3
Total	Susan Zhuang (incumbent)	17,062	98.6
Write-in		245	1.4
Total votes		17,307	100.0
Democratic hold			

=== 2023 ===
2023 New York City Council Democratic primary, District 43
Party	Candidate	Votes	%
Democratic	Susan Zhuang	2,126	58.5
Democratic	Wai-Yee Chan	1,127	31.0
Democratic	Stanley Ng	347	9.6
Write-in		32	0.9
Total votes		3,632	100.0

2023 New York City Council election, District 43
Party	Candidate	Votes	%
Democratic	Susan Zhuang	4,898	58.7
Republican	Ying Tan	2,188	26.2
Conservative	Vito J. LaBella	1,215	14.5
Write-in		50	0.6
Total votes		8,351	100.0
Democratic hold			

== See also ==
- Chinese people in New York City
