= Larry He =

American politician

Member-elect of the New York Senate from the 17th district
- Assuming office January 1, 2027
- Succeeding: Steve Chan

Personal details
- Born: Northwestern China
- Party: Democratic
- Education: Huazhong University of Science and Technology; McMaster University; Rensselaer Polytechnic Institute (PhD)

Larry He, also known as He Lening (贺立宁), is an American politician. He is the Democratic member-elect of the New York State Senate from the 17th district. Prior to his victory, he was a senior analyst for Independent System Operators and became active in Asian-American community affairs and served as chief of staff to state assemblyman William Colton.

== Biography ==
=== Early life and non-political career ===
He was born in Northwestern China. He earned a bachelor's degree in electrical engineering from Huazhong University of Science and Technology, a master's degree in electrical engineering from McMaster University, and a PhD in economics Rensselaer Polytechnic Institute in 2007. His doctoral dissertation, Interregional transportation, trade, and regional comparative advantage and development in China, was supervised by Faye Duchin. During his time at RPI, he served as the student body's academic senate representative.

He was employed as a senior analyst at both the California Independent System Operator and the New York Independent System Operator. He later became prominent in community leadership, including as president of the Chinese Community Center of the Capital District of New York and executive director of the Global Asian Carp Coalition. He has also served on the board of United Chinese Americans.

=== Political career ===
He worked as an intern at state assemblyman William Colton's office in 2006. In January 2024, he was appointed chief of staff to Colton. In December 2024, he became the Brooklyn Democratic Party's district leader for the 47th district. In March 2025, he was hired as the Asian outreach director for Andrew Cuomo's campaign in the 2025 New York City Democratic mayoral primary. He was a 2025 BridgesNY Fellow.

In May 2025, the New York Post and The New York Times both reported that He held several executive positions at Guangxi Beibu Gulf Investment Group, a Chinese state-owned enterprise, including as chair of their Coastal Petrochemical subsidiary, and that he did not disclose such connections as legally required for filings. Speaking to The New York Times, He denied being a member of the Chinese Communist Party and stated that his resume excluded his Chinese government connections "to avoid causing concern". He resigned from Cuomo's campaign, stating that he did not want the investigation "to be a distraction to this campaign". An American Enterprise Institute article linked He to New York City-based united front powerbroker John Chan, and called He's situation an example of foreign interests' involvement in machine politics.

He ran in the 2026 New York State Senate election in the 17th district against Republican incumbent Steve Chan. Preliminary vote counts after voting closed showed He winning the election by over 14 percentage points. New York Focus later called the election for He, flipping the district to Democratic.

=== Personal life ===
In 2024, He renounced his Chinese citizenship and became an American citizen.
