= Anne Carter (economist) =

American economist (born 1925)

- Born: Anne Pitts; May 7, 1925 (age 101); New York City, U.S.
- Education: Queens College, City University of New York, Radcliffe College
- Spouses: Robert Grosse, Franklin Carter
- Awards: 2008 Carolyn Shaw Bell Award; Fellow of the Econometric Society, 2003
- Scientific career
- Workplaces: Bates College, Brooklyn College, Brandeis University, Smith College, Wellesley College
- Doctoral advisor: Joseph Schumpeter

Anne Pitts Carter (born May 7, 1925) is an American educator and economist, specializing in technical change and technology transfer.

== Life ==
The daughter of Jacob J. Pitts, she was born Anne Pitts in New York City. She completed a bachelor's degree at Queens College and pursued graduate studies at Harvard University although, due to the conventions of the time, she was enrolled through Radcliffe College. In 1946, she married Robert Grosse, also a graduate student in economics. While she was working on her PhD thesis at Harvard, she taught part-time at Bates College and was professor of economics at Brooklyn College; she received her PhD in 1949. In the summer of that year, she moved to Cambridge to work with Wassily Leontief's Harvard Economic Research Project (HERP). She was given a full-time position; her husband was also offered a full-time position with the project and she was appalled to discover that he was given a larger salary. The couple divorced in 1950. From 1951 to 1955, she was a research fellow at Harvard, also teaching at Smith and Wellesley Colleges. In 1953, she married psychiatrist Franklin Carter; she had her first child in 1955. She was offered more flexible work arrangements so that she could continue her work with HERP.

During the 1960s, Carter became known as a leading expert in the field of input-output analysis; she served as director for HERP from 1968 to 1972. In 1966, she became an assistant professor in the Harvard economics department, becoming the first woman in the faculty. In 1970, she published Structural Change in the American Economy, which compared technical coefficients of the American economy in 1939, 1947 and 1958 as technology changed over time.

In 1971, Carter moved to Brandeis University as a visiting professor. She became full professor the following year. In 1973, when HERP was officially closed, its library and research materials were moved to Brandeis. From 1972 to 1979, Carter was director of the Brandeis Economic Research Center. She was dean of the Economics faculty from 1981 to 1986, chair of the Economics department from 1987 to 1993 and acting Dean of Arts and Sciences from 1999 to 2000. She is now professor emeritus at Brandeis.

In 1974, Leontief was asked by the United Nations to study the future of the world economy and he asked Carter to assist with developing an operational "world model" in support of this project.

Carter has served as an economic policy advisor to the American government and other private and international organizations. She was chair for the Russell Sage Foundation and founding president of the International Input-Output Association from 1987 to 1991. In 2009, she received the Carolyn Shaw Bell Prize from the American Economic Association. Carter is a fellow of the Econometric Society (2003), the Union of Concerned Scientists, and the American Association for the Advancement of Science (1984).
