= John Chan (born 1954) =

Chinese-American activist (born 1954)

- 陳善莊
- Born: 1954 (age 71–72); Fujian, China
- Other names: Chen Shanzhuang, Ah Jong
- Occupation: Political operative (united front)
- Organization: Chinese People's Political Consultative Conference
- Criminal information
- Status: Convicted
- Criminal charges: Racketeering; human smuggling; drug trafficking

John Chan (Chinese: 陳善莊; pinyin: Chen Shanzhuang, born 1954) is a united front operative based in New York City. Prior to his political activism, Chan was incarcerated for human smuggling and heroin trafficking.

== Background ==
Chan was born in Langqi Island, Fujian, China in 1954. In 1974, he moved to Hong Kong with his family to escape the Cultural Revolution. While in Hong Kong, he joined a gang. In 1985, he moved to the United States.

In 2012, he served as president of the Hong Kong Chinese Chamber of Commerce in the United States. In 2013, he co-founded the Brooklyn Asian Community Association (now known as the American Asian Community Association) with overseas Chinese leaders. In 2015, he organized the Coalition of Asian Americans for Civil Rights (CAACR).

=== Criminal history ===
While in New York, he was a part of the Wo Lee Kwan triad, becoming a part of an operation to smuggle Chinese nationals into the United States.

In July 2001, he was charged and convicted with smuggling Chinese nationals inside shipping containers at ports in Washington. Chan got his sentence reduced after giving information about triad boss Frank Ma. Pleading guilty to racketeering, human smuggling, trafficking heroin and operating illegal gambling parlors, Chan was sentenced to time served and released in 2008 after assisting prosecutors for more than five years from prison.

== Political activism ==
Chan has been a prominent fundraiser within the local overseas Chinese community for Eric Adams, Grace Meng, and other politicians. The New York Times and The Washington Post has described Chan as a prominent power broker in local New York City politics.

=== United Front work ===
Chan has cultivated strong ties with officials from the Consulate General of China, New York and has frequently engaged in joint events.

In 1999, he organized a protest against the United States bombing of the Chinese embassy in Belgrade. In that same year, Chan organized New Jersey's first PRC flag raising event and attended the 50th National Day celebrations in Beijing as a special guest. Months later, Chan sent letters to members of Congress that expressed support for Beijing's policies towards Falun Gong and hosting of the 2008 Summer Olympics. In 2017, an organization that Chan founded hosted a celebration marking the 20th anniversary of Hong Kong's handover to the PRC. In that same year, Chan sent a message to the 19th National Congress of the Chinese Communist Party lending his support to the "Chinese Dream" and stating, "Overseas Chinese should stay closely united like pomegranate seeds and build the Chinese dream together, as President Xi said."

Chan helped pass a 2019 resolution in the New York State Senate which designated October 1, 2019 as China Day and had fundraised for William Colton, a New York State Assemblyman who in the same year introduced a bill that proposed designating the same day as a public holiday in the state. During the COVID-19 pandemic, an organization that Chan led helped send 1 million masks to China in the beginning of 2020 after obtaining approval from the Chinese consulate in New York. Later that year, the organization helped the consulate distribute personal protective equipment to the local Chinese American community. The same year, he issued a statement in support of the 2020 Hong Kong national security law.

In the 2022 New York State Senate election, Chan supported a primary challenger to Democratic New York State Senator Yuh-Line Niou, who had taken in part in events with Taiwanese officials. He also supported Republican candidate Lester Chang, who defeated Democratic incumbent Peter J. Abbate Jr. who had held the seat since 1987. In the early morning of March 31, 2023, Chan participated in a pro-Chinese unification protest in front of the Lotte New York Palace in Midtown Manhattan, New York, opposing Taiwanese President Tsai Ing-wen’s visit to the United States and calling her a traitor. After New York State Senator Iwen Chu attended a banquet with Tsai, Chan supported her opponent Steve Chan in the 2024 New York State Senate election, contributing to Chu's loss. Chan also supported an opponent of Senator Ron Kim, who was unsuccessful.

In 2023, Chan, in coordination with Chinese consular officials, helped to organize protests in support for President Xi Jinping during his attendance to the APEC summit in San Francisco in which Tibetan, Uyghur, and Hong Kong dissidents were attacked. He also attended the invitation-only banquet dinner for Xi during his trip. In March 2024, Chan was one of the 20 Chinese diaspora representatives to attend the second session of the 14th National Committee of the Chinese People's Political Consultative Conference in Beijing. Chan was reportedly interviewed by the FBI shortly prior to traveling to China.

== See also ==
- Transnational repression by China
