= Polenske =

Polenske is a surname. Notable people with the surname include:

- Karen R. Polenske (born 1937), American economist
- Michael Polenske, American entrepreneur, gallery owner, and vintner

== See also ==
- Polenske value, in food chemistry, a value determined when examining fat
