= Joseph Lin =

Joseph Lin may refer to:

- Joseph Lin (violinist)
- Joseph Lin (basketball)
