= Taiwanese people in New York City =

Ethnic group in the United States

New York City is home to the second-largest Taiwanese American population, after the Los Angeles metropolitan area, California, enumerating an estimated 40,000 to 50,000 individuals as of 2020.

== History and location ==
The neighborhood of Flushing, Queens, is one of the largest and fastest growing Taiwanese enclaves outside Asia. Main Street and the area to its west, particularly along Roosevelt Avenue, have become the primary nexus of Flushing's Taiwanese community. However, this community continues to expand southeastward along Kissena Boulevard and northward beyond Northern Boulevard. Taiwanese began the surge of immigration in the 1980s. Flushing originally started off as Little Taipei or Little Taiwan due to the large Taiwanese population. Due to the working-class Cantonese immigrants population and poor housing conditions of Manhattan's Chinatown, the more affluent Taiwanese population settled in Flushing.

Later on, when groups of Mandarin-speaking non-Cantonese Chinese started arriving into New York City, they mainly settled in Flushing's developing Chinatown with other Mandarin Chinese speakers, away from Manhattan's then Cantonese-dominant Chinatown. Later, Flushing's Chinatown would become the main center of different Chinese regional groups and cultures in New York City.

By 1990, Asians constituted 41% of the population of the core area of Flushing, with the Chinese population in turn representing 41% of Asian residents. A 1986 estimate by the Flushing Chinese Business Association approximated 60,000 Chinese in Flushing alone. Mandarin Chinese, commonly spoken by Taiwanese, has since become the lingua franca in New York City's ethnic Chinese communities.

Elmhurst, Queens, also has a large and growing Taiwanese community. Previously a small area with Chinese shops on Broadway between 81st Street and Cornish Avenue, this new Chinatown has now expanded to 45th Avenue and Whitney Avenue. Since 2000, thousands of Taiwanese Americans have migrated into Whitestone, Queens (白石), given the sizeable presence of the neighboring Flushing Chinatown, and have continued their expansion eastward in Queens and into neighboring affluent and highly educated Nassau County (拿騷縣) on Long Island (長島).

== Transportation ==
Facilitating migration from Taiwan to New York City are China Airlines and EVA Air, which fly non-stop between Taipei Taoyuan International Airport and John F. Kennedy International Airport in Queens.

As of 2016, the two largest Taiwanese airlines have provided free shuttle services to and from JFK International Airport in New York City for customers based in New Jersey.

- China Airlines's service stops in Fort Lee, Parsippany, and Jersey City
- EVA Air's service stops in Jersey City, Piscataway, Fort Lee, and East Hanover.

== Taiwanese New Yorkers ==
Taiwanese New Yorkers (紐約華台灣人)

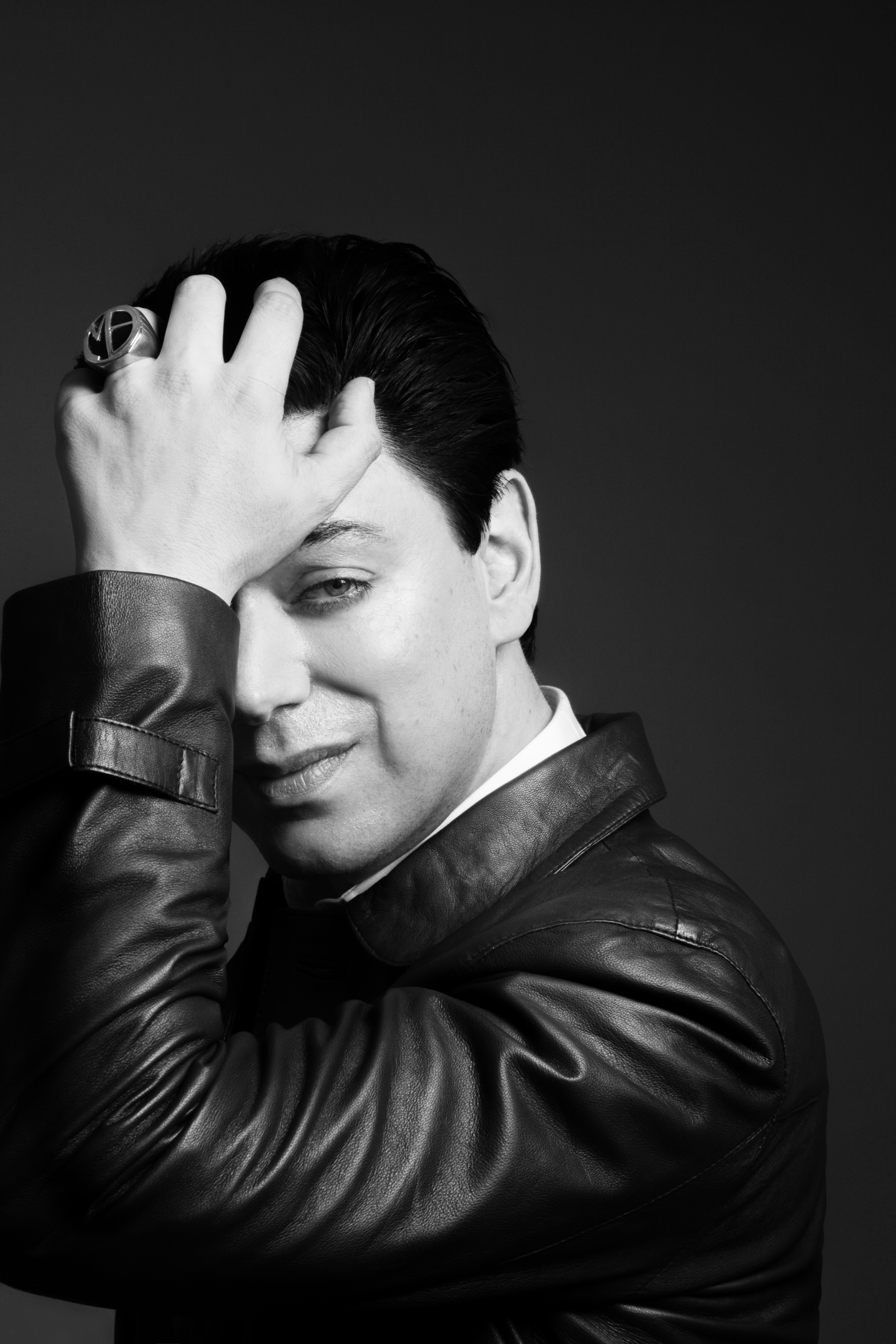
Malan Breton

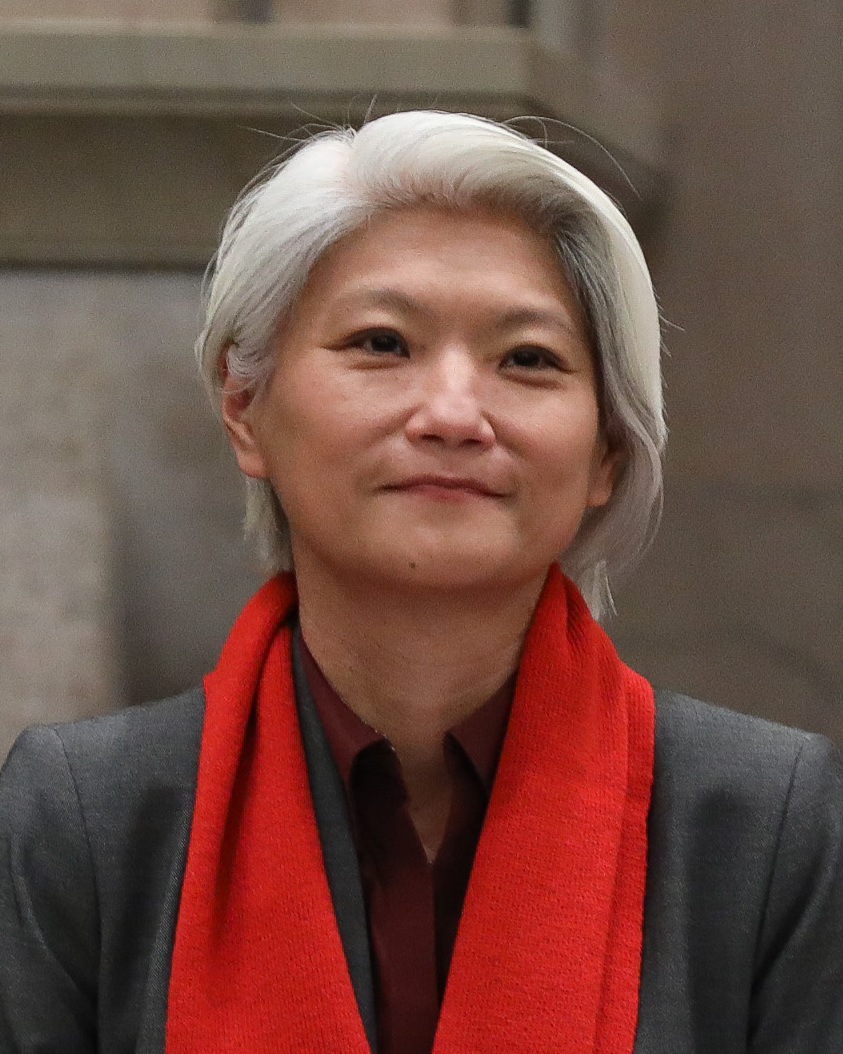
Iwen Chu

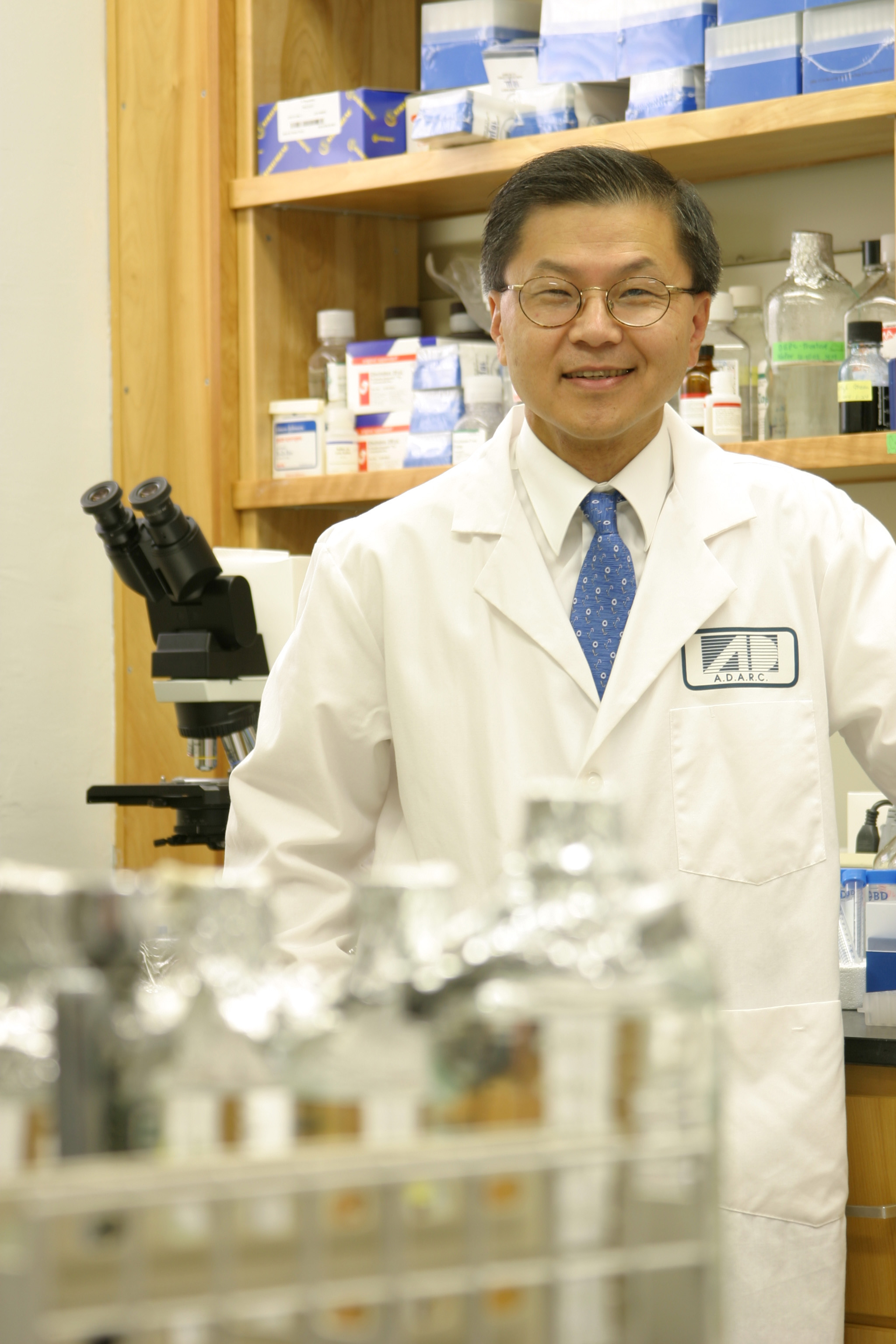
David Ho

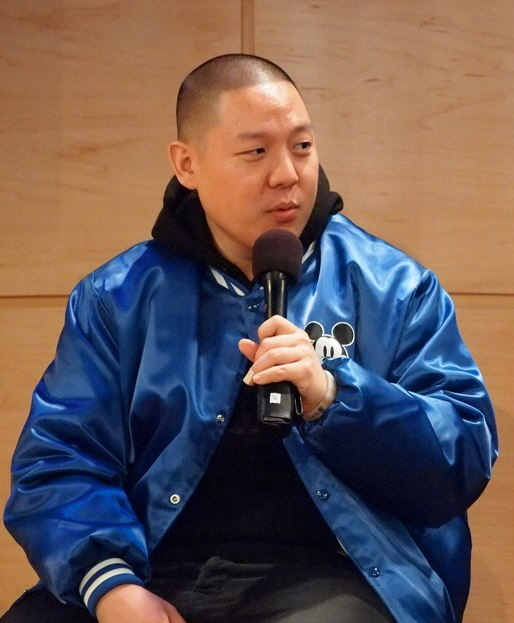
Eddie Huang

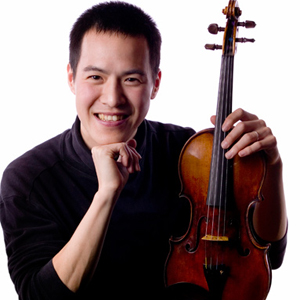
Joseph Lin

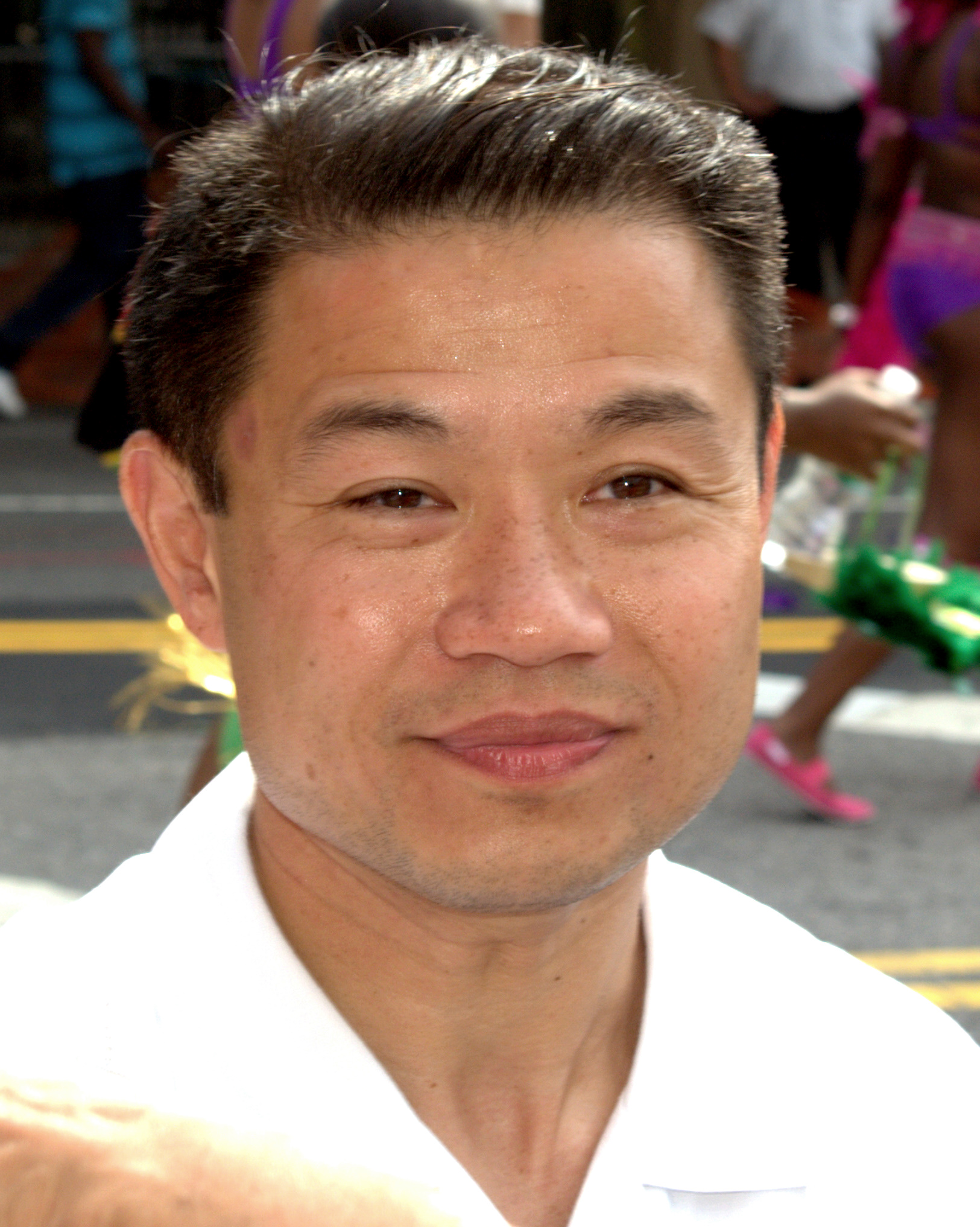
John Liu

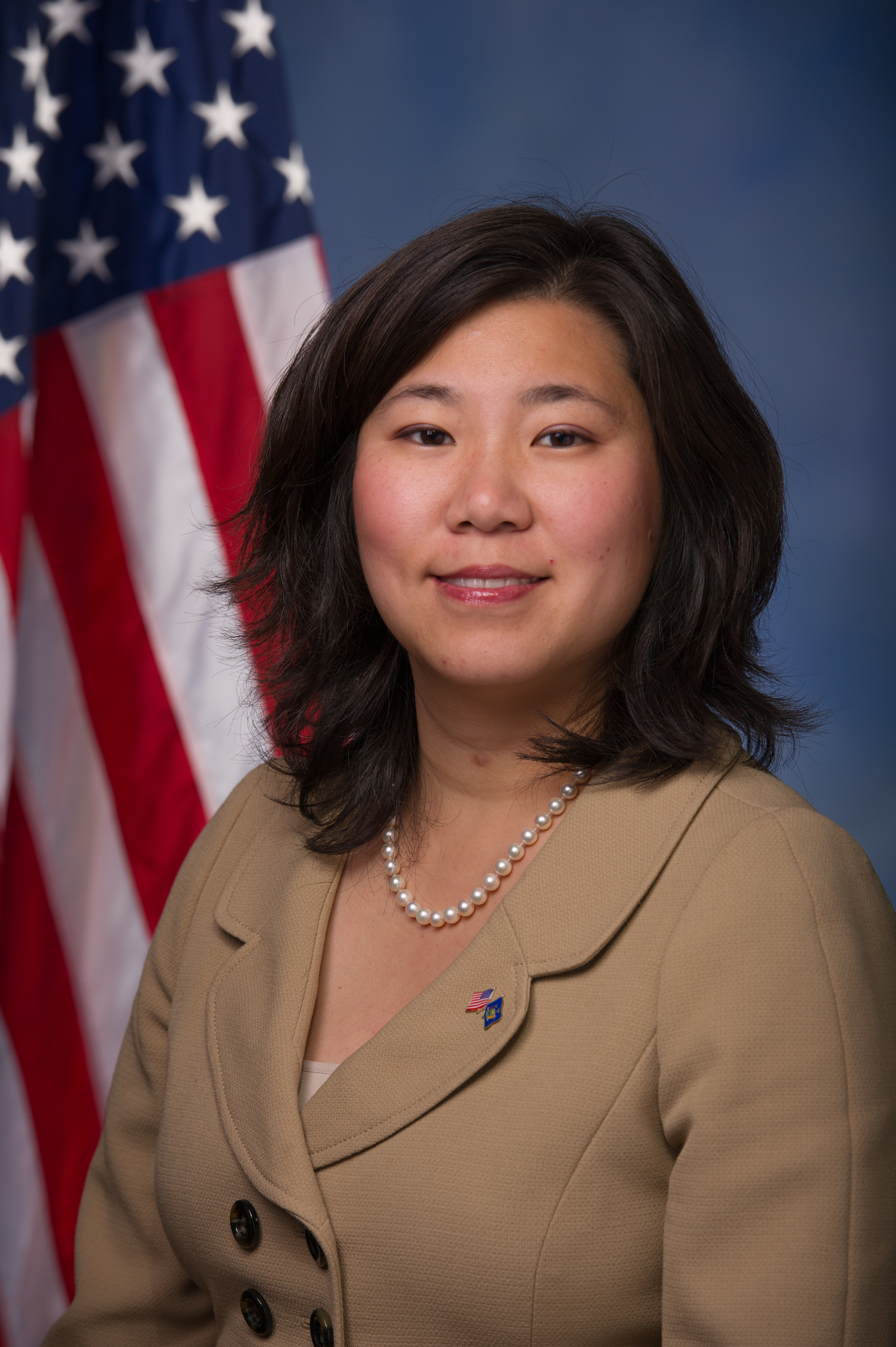
Grace Meng

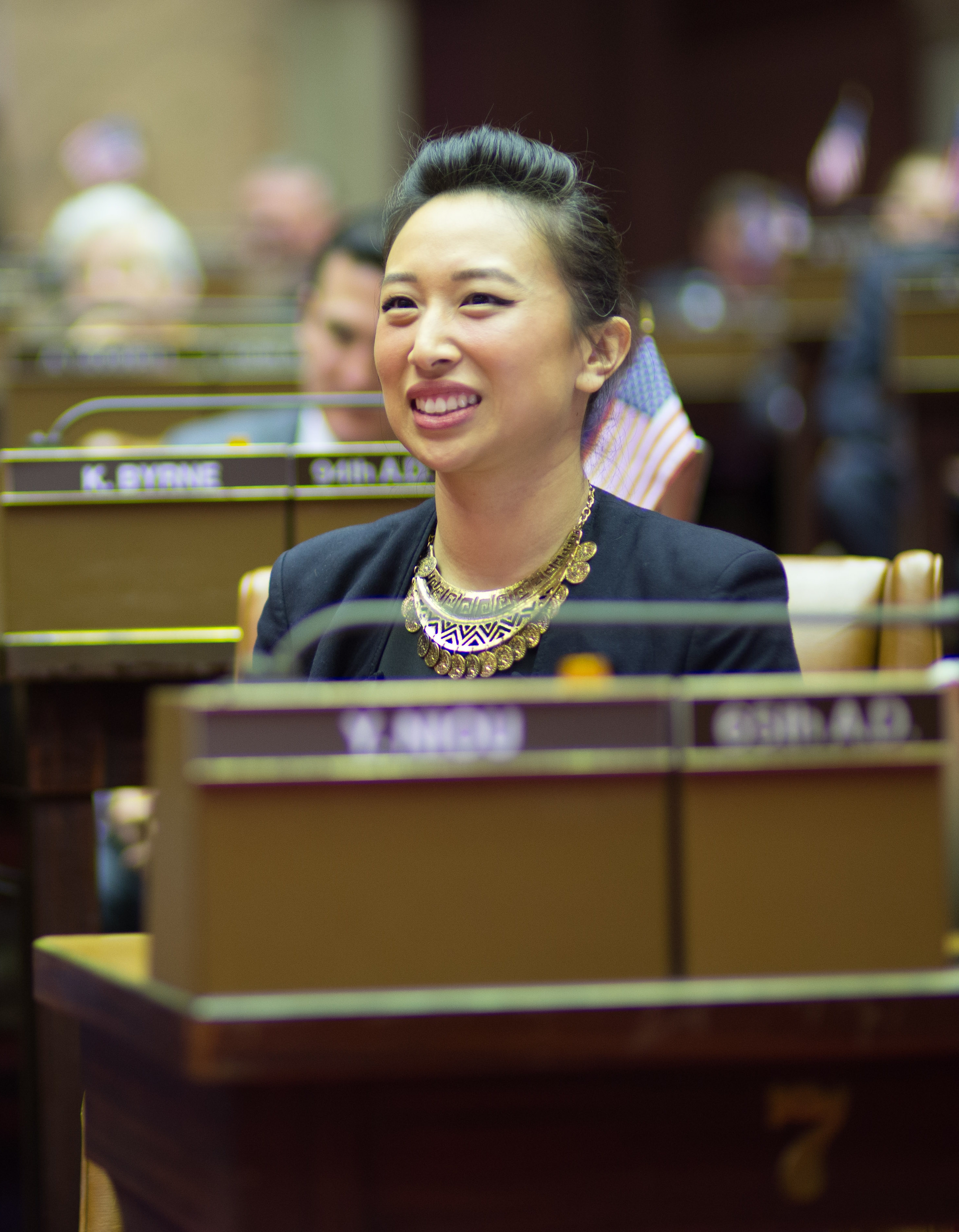
Yuh-Line Niou

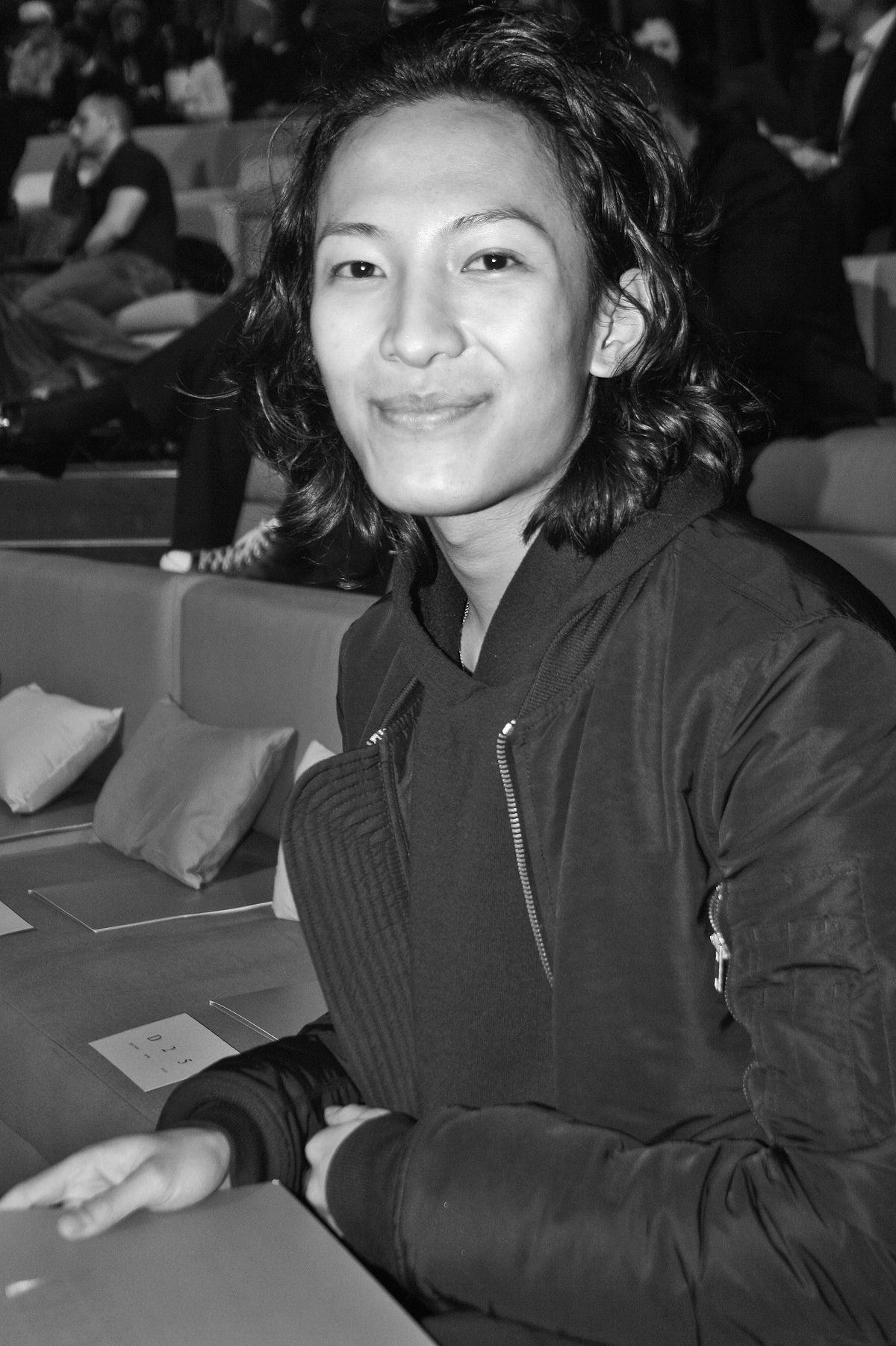
Alexander Wang

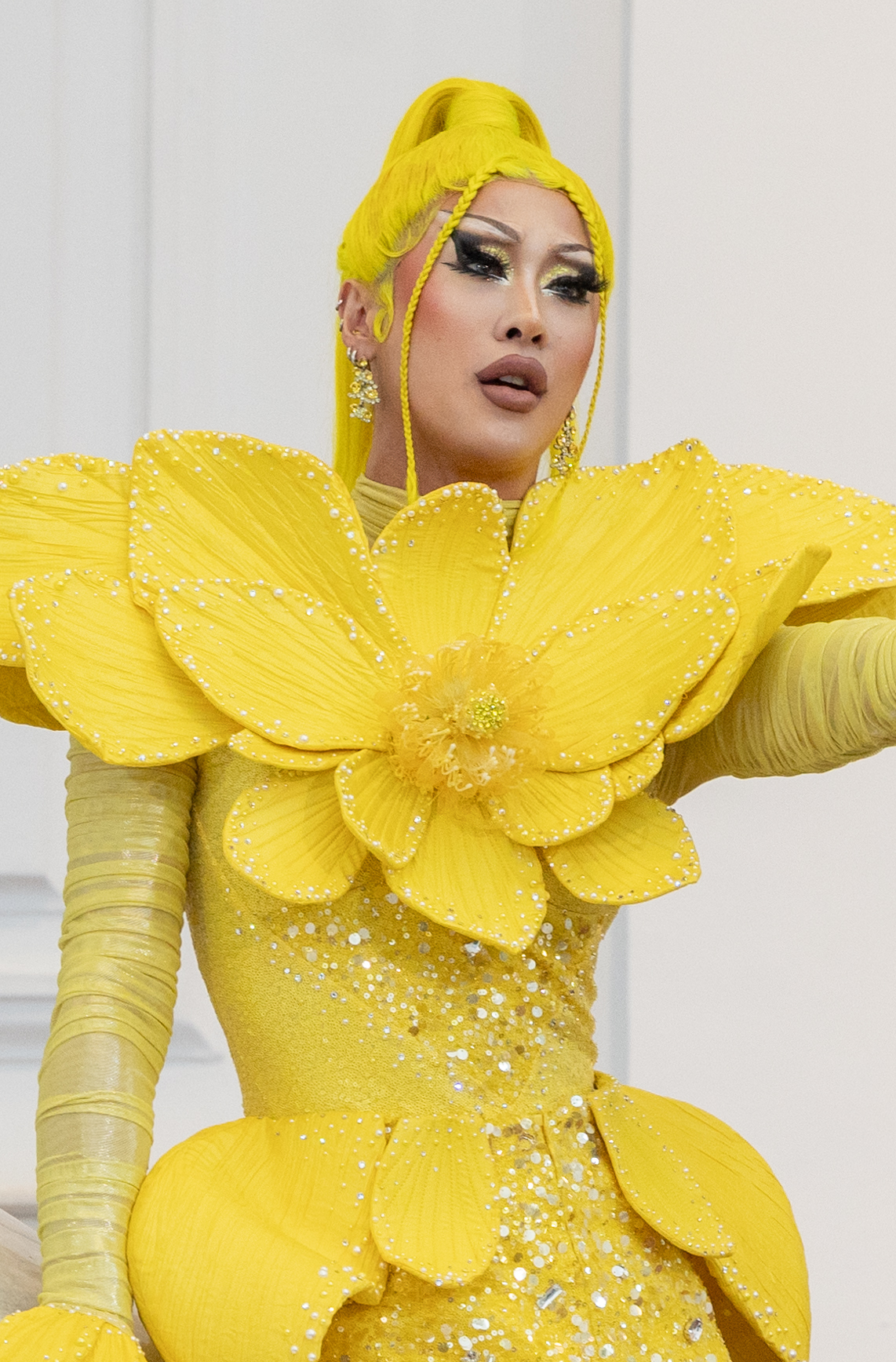
Nymphia Wind

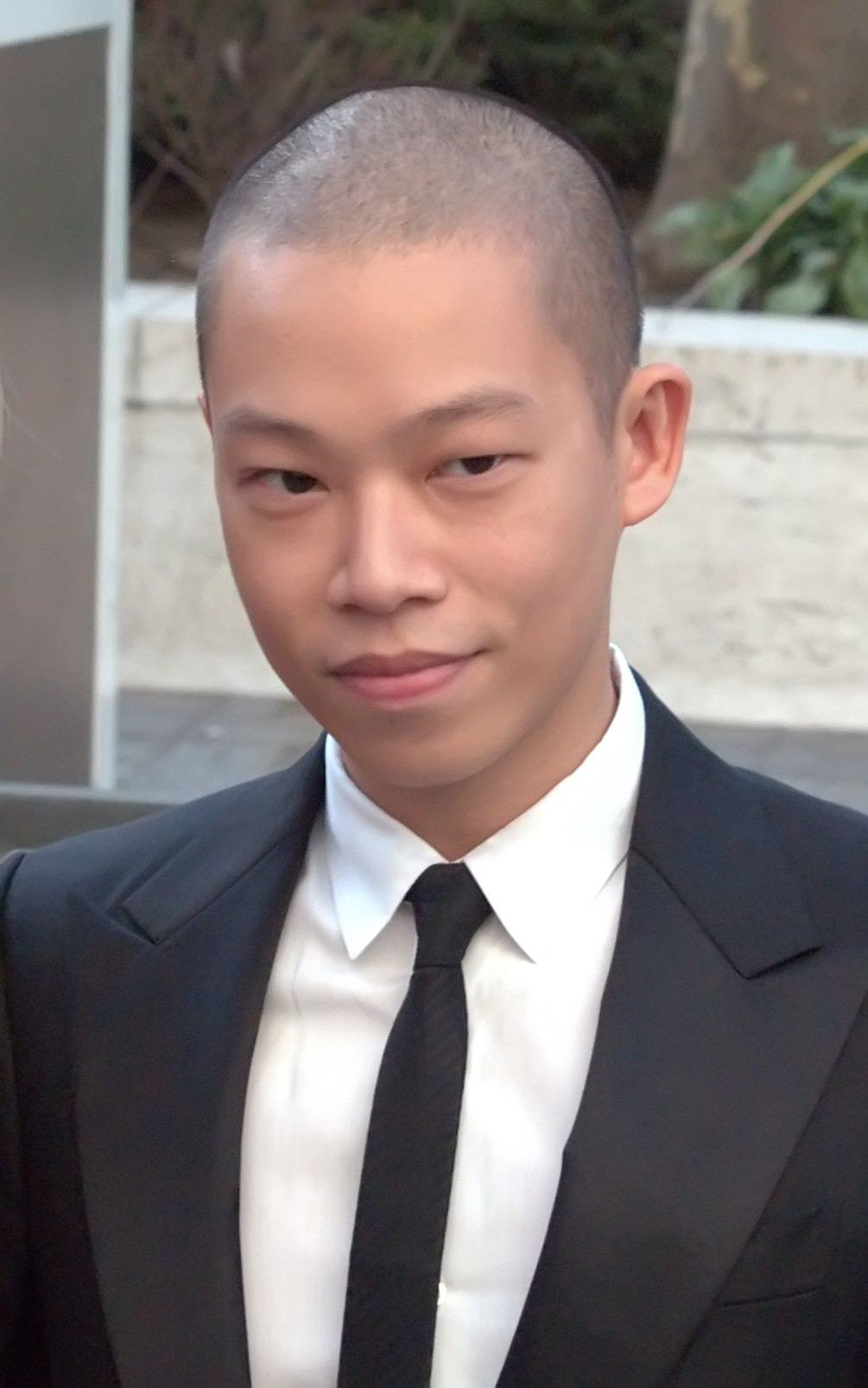
Jason Wu

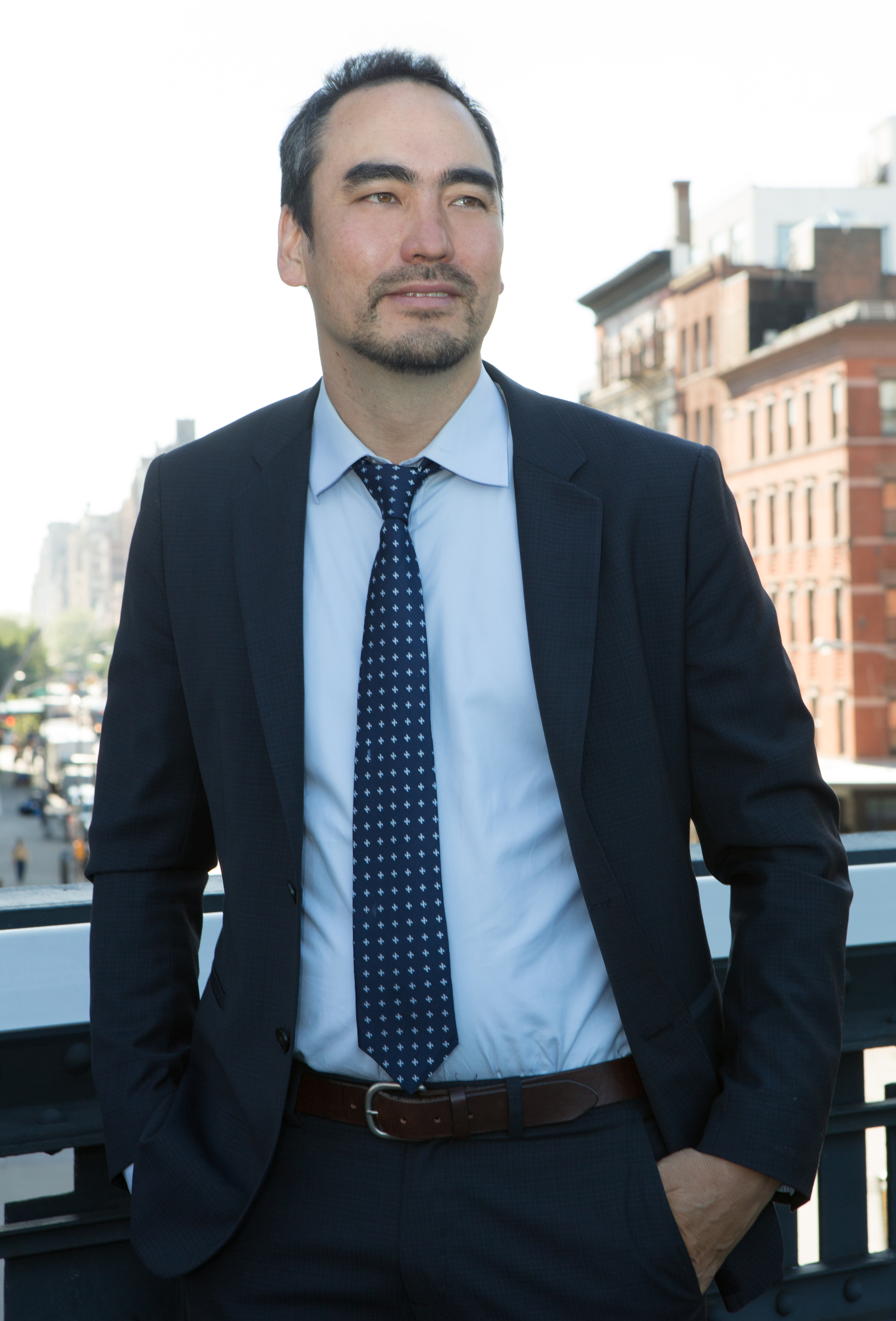
Tim Wu

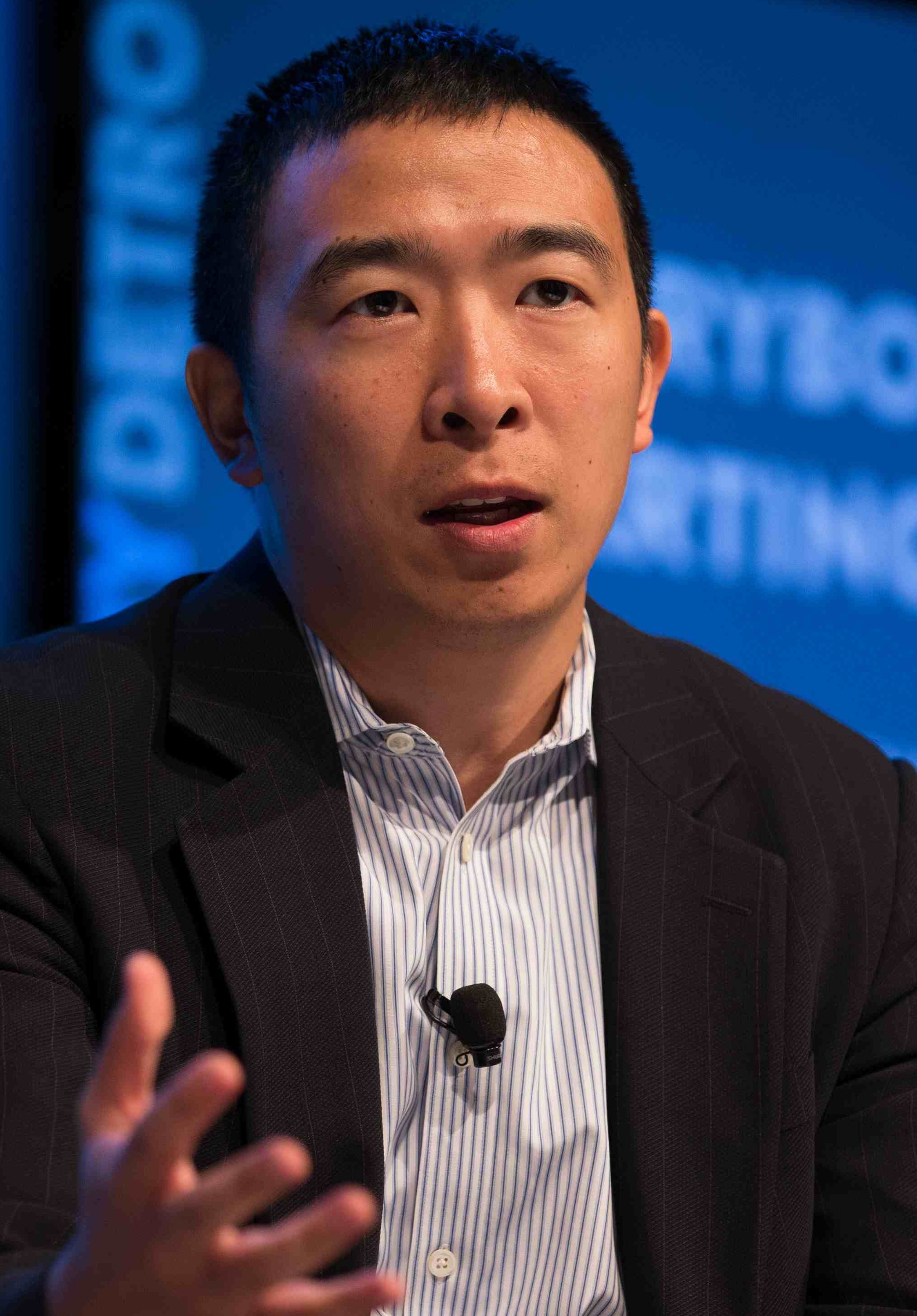
Andrew Yang

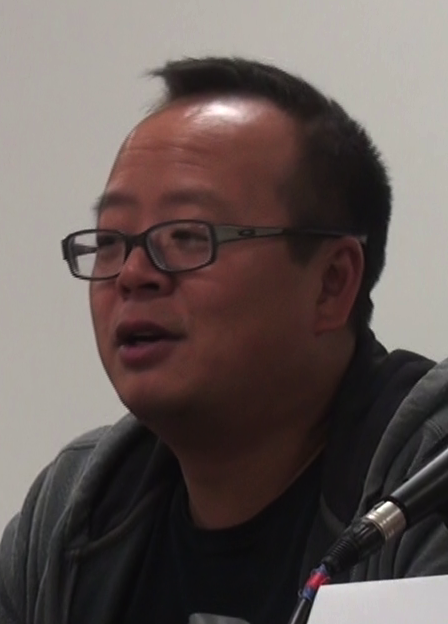
Jeff Yang

=== Academia and humanities ===
- Tim Wu – professor at Columbia Law School

=== Academia and sciences ===
- David Ho – scientific researcher and Helen Wu professor at Columbia University

=== Entrepreneurship and technology ===
- Andrew Yang – founder, Venture for America; U.S. 2020 Democratic presidential candidate and universal basic income advocate

=== Law, politics, and diplomacy ===
- Iwen Chu – former New York State Senator, 17th district (2023-2024)
- John Liu – New York State Senator, 16th district (2023-present) and former New York City Comptroller (first Taiwanese American and Asian American to be elected Comptroller, 2010-2014)
- Grace Meng – member of the United States House of Representatives, representing New York's 6th congressional district in Queens (2013-present)
- Yuh-Line Niou – former member of the New York State Assembly, representing the 65th District in Lower Manhattan (2017-2022)

=== Media ===
- Eddie Huang – writer, journalist, author of Fresh Off the Boat: A Memoir
- Jennifer 8. Lee – journalist, credits including The New York Times
- Hua Hsu – journalist, The New Yorker
- Jeff Yang – media consultant, "Tao Jones" columnist for The Wall Street Journal

=== Theater, arts, and culture ===
- Jenny Lin – pianist
- Joseph Lin – violinist
- Alexander Wang – fashion designer
- Jason Wu – fashion designer
- Sophia Yan – classical pianist; journalist
- Nymphia Wind – winner of RuPaul's Drag Race season 16; fashion designer

== See also ==
- Asian Americans in New York City
- Chinese people in New York City
- Bangladeshis in New York City
- Demographics of New York City
- Filipinos in the New York metropolitan area
- Fuzhounese in New York City
- Indians in the New York City metropolitan region
- Japanese in New York City
- Koreans in New York City
- Russians in New York City
- Taiwanese Americans
