= John Chan (disambiguation) =

John Chan is the chairman of Transport International Holdings Limited and former Hong Kong Secretary for Education.

John Chan may also refer to:

- John Chan, New Democratic Party candidate, 2008 Canadian federal election for Calgary Centre-North district
- Claw (John Chan), DC Comics character
- Johnny Chan (born 1957), American poker player
- Johnny Chan (actor) (fl. 1970s), Hong Kong actor
- John Chan (born 1954), united front operative

== See also ==
- John Chen
- Jackie Chan (disambiguation)
