= New York's 47th State Assembly district =

American legislative district

Assemblymember
William Colton; D–Bensonhurst

New York's 47th State Assembly district is one of the 150 districts in the New York State Assembly. It has been represented by Democrat William Colton since 1997.

== Geography ==
=== 2020s ===
District 47 is in Brooklyn. It comprises most of Gravesend, and portions of Bath Beach and Bensonhurst.

The district overlaps (partially) with New York's 8th, 9th and 11th congressional districts, the 17th, 22nd, 23rd and 26th districts of the New York State Senate, and the 38th, 43rd, 47th, 48th and 50th districts of the New York City Council.

=== 2010s ===
District 47 is in Brooklyn. It comprises Bath Beach, Bensonhurst, Gravesend, Dyker Heights and portions of Midwood.

== Recent election results ==
=== 2026 ===
2026 New York State Assembly election, District 47
Party	Candidate	Votes	%
Democratic	William Colton (incumbent)		
Republican	John Riccotone		
Conservative	John Riccotone		
Stop Mamdani	John Riccotone		
Total	John Riccotone		
Write-in			
Total votes			100.0

=== 2024 ===
2024 New York State Assembly election, District 47
Party	Candidate	Votes	%
Democratic	William Colton (incumbent)	16,365	60.5
Republican	David Sepiashvili	9,489	
Conservative	David Sepiashvili	1,087	
Total	David Sepiashvili	10,566	39.1
Write-in		121	0.4
Total votes		27,052	100.0
Democratic hold			

=== 2022 ===
2022 New York State Assembly election, District 47
Party	Candidate	Votes	%
Democratic	William Colton (incumbent)	9,503	54.7
Republican	Dmitriy Kugel	7,329	
Conservative	Dmitriy Kugel	509	
Total	Dmitriy Kugel	7,838	45.1
Write-in		21	0.1
Total votes		17,362	100.0
Democratic hold			

=== 2020 ===
2020 New York State Assembly election, District 47
Party	Candidate	Votes	%
Democratic	William Colton	16,977	
Working Families	William Colton	1,882	
Total	William Colton (incumbent)	18,859	61.8
Republican	Barbara Marino	10,769	
Conservative	Barbara Marino	843	
Total	Barbara Marino	11,612	38.1
Write-in		43	0.1
Total votes		30,514	100.0
Democratic hold			

=== 2018 ===
2018 New York State Assembly election, District 47
Party	Candidate	Votes	%
Democratic	William Colton	11,860	
Working Families	William Colton	665	
Total	William Colton (incumbent)	12,525	69.4
Republican	Florence Lasalle	5,101	
Conservative	Florence Lasalle	400	
Total	Florence Lasalle	5,501	30.5
Write-in		21	0.1
Total votes		18,047	100.0
Democratic hold			

=== 2016 ===
2016 New York State Assembly election, District 47
Party	Candidate	Votes	%
Democratic	William Colton	16,989	
Working Families	William Colton	1,883	
Total	William Colton (incumbent)	18,872	88.5
Conservative	Malka Shahar	2,416	11.3
Write-in		48	0.2
Total votes		21,336	100.0
Democratic hold			

=== 2014 ===
2014 New York State Assembly election, District 47
Party	Candidate	Votes	%
Democratic	William Colton	5,851	
Working Families	William Colton	596	
Total	William Colton (incumbent)	6,447	70.7
Republican	Joseph Baranello	2,151	
Conservative	Joseph Baranello	490	
Total	Joseph Baranello	2,641	29.0
Write-in		32	0.3
Total votes		9,120	100.0
Democratic hold			

=== 2012 ===
2012 New York State Assembly election, District 47
Party	Candidate	Votes	%
Democratic	William Colton	13,393	
Working Families	William Colton	977	
Total	William Colton (incumbent)	14,370	74.3
Republican	James Rippa	4,436	
Conservative	James Rippa	506	
Total	James Rippa	4,942	25.6
Write-in		19	0.1
Total votes		19,331	100.0
Democratic win (new boundaries)			

=== 2010 ===
2010 New York State Assembly election, District 47
Party	Candidate	Votes	%
Democratic	William Colton	8,155	
Working Families	William Colton	450	
Total	William Colton (incumbent)	8,605	65.8
Republican	Phyllis Carbo	3,943	
Conservative	Phyllis Carbo	514	
Total	Phyllis Carbo	4,457	34.1
Write-in		9	0.1
Total votes		13,071	100.0
Democratic hold			

=== 2008 ===
2008 New York State Assembly election, District 47
Party	Candidate	Votes	%
Democratic	William Colton	14,178	
Working Families	William Colton	771	
Total	William Colton (incumbent)	14,949	72.6
Republican	Russell Gallo	5,229	
Conservative	Russell Gallo	398	
Total	Russell Gallo	5,627	27.3
Write-in		1	0.1
Total votes		20,577	100.0
Democratic hold			

=== 2006 ===
2006 New York State Assembly election, District 47
Party	Candidate	Votes	%
Democratic	William Colton	8,644	
Working Families	William Colton	524	
Total	William Colton (incumbent)	9,168	78.5
Republican	Phyllis Carbo	2,246	
Conservative	Phyllis Carbo	263	
Total	Phyllis Carbo	2,509	21.5
Write-in		0	0.0
Total votes		11,677	100.0
Democratic hold			

=== 2004 ===
2004 New York State Assembly election, District 47
Party	Candidate	Votes	%
Democratic	William Colton	14,306	
Working Families	William Colton	758	
Total	William Colton (incumbent)	15,064	94.8
Conservative	Glenn Bell	821	5.2
Write-in		0	0.0
Total votes		15,885	100.0
Democratic hold			

=== 2002 ===
2002 New York State Assembly election, District 47
Party	Candidate	Votes	%
Democratic	William Colton	7,247	
Working Families	William Colton	231	
Liberal	William Colton	203	
Total	William Colton (incumbent)	7,681	93.2
Conservative	Rose Delgiudice	561	6.8
Write-in		0	0.1
Total votes		8,242	100.0
Democratic hold			

=== 2000 ===
2000 New York State Assembly election, District 47
Party	Candidate	Votes	%
Democratic	William Colton	14,374	
Liberal	William Colton	342	
Working Families	William Colton	318	
Total	William Colton (incumbent)	15,034	71.1
Republican	Nora DeAngelo	4,973	23.5
Conservative	Vincent Cimato	1,140	5.4
Write-in		0	0.0
Total votes		21,147	100.0

=== Federal results in Assembly District 47 ===
Year	Office	Results
2024	President	Trump 60.8 - 37.3%
2024	Senate	Sapraicone 55.4 - 43.3%
2022	Senate	Pinion 55.2 – 44.8%
2020	President	Biden 51.6 – 47.2%
2018	Senate	Gillibrand 62.5 – 37.5%
2016	President	Clinton 52.7 – 44.7%
2016	Senate	Schumer 77.6 – 20.7%
2012	President	Obama 57.5 – 41.3%
2012	Senate	Gillibrand 68.4 – 29.9%
