= Moon Duchin =

American mathematician

- Education: Harvard University (BA Mathematics and Women's Studies 1998); University of Chicago (MS Mathematics 1999, PhD Mathematics 2005)
- Known for: Research in geometric group theory and the mathematics of gerrymandering
- Awards: Fellow of the American Mathematical Society, Guggenheim Fellowship
- Scientific career
- Fields: Mathematics
- Workplaces: Cornell University, Tufts University
- Thesis: Thin triangles and a multiplicative ergodic theorem for Teichmüller geometry (2005)
- Doctoral advisor: Alex Eskin

Moon Duchin is an American mathematician who works as a professor at the University of Chicago. Her mathematical research concerns geometric topology, geometric group theory, and Teichmüller theory. She has done significant research on the mathematics of redistricting and gerrymandering, and founded a research group, MGGG Redistricting Lab, to advance these mathematical studies and their nonpartisan application in the real world of US politics. She is also interested in the cultural studies, philosophy, and history of science. Duchin was one of the core faculty members and served as director of the Science, Technology, and Society program at Tufts.

== Early life and education ==
Duchin was born to Faye Duchin, an economist, and Micha Brym. Duchin was given her first name, Moon, by parents "on the science-y fringes of the hippie classification". She was given her mother's last name, and her sister was given her father's. She grew up knowing from a young age that she wanted to become a mathematician. As a student at Stamford High School in Connecticut, she completed the regular high school mathematics curriculum in her sophomore year, and continued to learn mathematics through independent study. She was active in math and science camps and competitions, and did a summer research project in the geometry of numbers with Noam Elkies.

Duchin studied at Harvard University as an undergraduate, where she was also active in queer organizing, and finished a double major in mathematics and women's studies in 1998. At the time, she was unsure how to combine the two majors into a single thesis, so she decided to write two separate ones.

As a graduate student in mathematics at the University of Chicago, she continued feminist activism by teaching gender studies and pushing the university to add gender-neutral bathrooms, and was mentioned mockingly by name on the Rush Limbaugh show. She completed her doctorate in 2005, under the supervision of Alex Eskin. She was a postdoctoral researcher at the University of California at Davis, and the University of Michigan, before joining the Tufts faculty in 2011.

== Work ==
Duchin's mathematical research has focused on geometric topology, geometric group theory, and Teichmüller theory. For example, one of her results is that, for a broad class of locally flat surfaces, the geometry of the surface is entirely determined by the shortest length in each homotopy class of simple closed curves. In 2022 Duchin appeared in the Netflix documentary A Trip to Infinity, discussing the mathematical implications of infinity.

Duchin's expertise in geometry has led her to conduct research on the mathematics of gerrymandering. A key aspect of this research is the geometric notion of the compactness of a given political district, a numerical measure that attempts to quantify how extensively gerrymandered it is. “What courts have been looking for is one definition of compactness that they can understand, that we can compute, and that they can use as a kind of go-to standard”, she said in an interview with The Chronicle of Higher Education.

To help tackle the challenge of finding an agreed-upon standard, Duchin has developed a long-term, wide-ranging project on the mathematics of gerrymandering. As a part of this project, she founded a summer program to train mathematicians to become expert witnesses in related legal cases. In 2016, she founded the Metric Geometry and Gerrymandering Group (MGGG) which is a nonpartisan research group that coordinates and publicizes research on geometry, computing, and their application to the redistricting process in the US.

In 2018-2019 she took a leave of absence from Tufts, and was a Fellow at the Radcliffe Institute for Advanced Study at Harvard University. Her research focus was "Political Geometry: The Mathematics of Redistricting". In 2018, Governor of Pennsylvania Tom Wolf enlisted Duchin to help him evaluate newly drawn redistricting maps for fairness. This happened as a consequence of the Supreme Court of Pennsylvania decision which declared the state's 2011 US congressional districting map to be unconstitutional. Duchin prepared a report published on February 15, 2018.

In 2022, a panel of judges threw out Alabama's soon-to-be-used congressional maps, citing the fact that the percentage of black people in the state had risen to about a quarter of the population. To draw some new, fairer maps, they turned to Duchin, who came up with 4 nearly-similar maps that would put the Black and Democratic-leaning cities of Mobile and Montgomery together, therefore complementing the one Black and blue-leaning district in the state with a second one.

Duchin was hired by Cornell University in 2024 as part of the Brooks School of Public Policy and College of Arts and Sciences mathematics department. As of 2026, she is a professor at the University of Chicago.

== Awards and honors ==
In 2016 Duchin was named as a fellow of the American Mathematical Society "for contributions to geometric group theory and Teichmüller theory, and for service to the mathematical community". She was also a Mathematical Association of America Distinguished Lecturer for that year, speaking on the mathematics of voting systems. In 2018 she was awarded a Guggenheim fellowship.
