= Karen R. Polenske =

American economist

Karen Rosel Polenske
- Born: March 20, 1937 (age 89)

Academic background
- Education: Harvard University; Syracuse University
- Influences: Wassily Leontief

Academic work
- Discipline: Regional science, economic development, political economy
- Institutions: Massachusetts Institute of Technology
- Notable ideas: Input-output model
- Awards: Regional Science Association International Fellow (2005)

Karen Rosel Polenske (born March 20, 1937) is an American regional economist specialized in energy, environmental, and infrastructure analyses, and input-output accounts and models, particularly at the subnational scale. She is currently the Peter de Florez Professor of Regional Political Economy at the Massachusetts Institute of Technology (MIT).

Polenske received her undergraduate degree in Home Economics from the Oregon State University in 1959. She holds a master's degree in public administration and economics from Syracuse University and a PhD in economics from Harvard University, where she was in charge of the regional work at the Harvard Economic Research Project. Working with Wassily W. Leontief, she directed one of the most extensive multiregional input-output research studies of the U.S. economy in history.

She has been director of the multiregional planning research team at MIT since 1972. She is also past president of the International Input-Output Association. Polenske has been an advisor to international agencies, including the United Nations Development Programme, Intergovernmental Panel on Climate Change, and the World Bank, as well as an economic consultant to the U.S. Bureau of Economic Analysis, Department of Commerce, Department of Justice, and the United States Army Corps of Engineers.

== Awards ==
We consider [Polenske's] work to be an absolute exemplar of an industry studies book due to its focus on a particular industry, its close contact with people in that industry at multiple levels, its theoretical and empirical grounding, its impact on the industry, and its potential impact as a model for industry studies across countries

— Sloan Industry Studies Selection Committee, on Polenske's book The Technology, Energy, Environmental-Health (TEEH) Chain in China: A Case Study of Cokemaking, winner of the Sloan Industry Studies 2008 Best Book Award

In 2007, Polenske received special recognition from Rajendra K. Pachauri, chair of the Intergovernmental Panel on Climate Change, for having "contributed substantially to the work of the Intergovernmental Panel on Climate Change (IPCC)," thus contributing to the IPCC's award of the 2007 Nobel Peace Prize. In 2005 she became a lifetime Regional Science Association International (RSAI) Fellow, in recognition to significant scholarly and research contributions to the field of regional science. In 1999, she received the Margaret McCoy Award, for her outstanding contribution towards the advancement of women in planning at institutions of higher education through service, teaching, and research, and in 1996 she was awarded the Walter Isard Distinguished Scholar Prize for distinguished long-term achievements in the field of Regional Science.

== Selected publications ==
Her publications include eight books, and numerous articles in key economic, energy, environmental, and planning journals, establishing her as a leading political economist.

=== Recent articles ===
- Karen R. Polenske, Feng Fu, Hongtao Liu, Zheng Li, "Measuring the energy consumption of China’s domestic investment from 1992 to 2007", Elsevier, 2013-02-01
- Karen R. Polenske, Nicolas O. Rockler, "Ideal or Not Ideal Interregional Input-Output Accounts and Model", SAGE Journals, 2013-01-01
- Karen R. Polenske, Roberto Guerrero Compeán, "Antagonistic bioenergies: Technological divergence of the ethanol industry in Brazil", Elsevier, 2011-11-01
- Karen R. Polenske, Xin Li, Zhiyu Chen, "Land Recycling in China and its Implication for the Regional Economy", AISRe-Associazione Italiana di Scienze Regionali, 2011-01-01
- Karen R. Polenske, Hongtao Liu, YouminXi, Ju’eGuo, "Comprehensive evaluation of effects of straw-based electricity generation: A Chinese case", ElsevierLtd., 2010-10-01
- Karen R. Polenske, Patrick Canning, Ainsley Charles, Sonya Huang, Arnold Waters, "Energy Use in the U.S. Food System", United States Department of Agriculture, Economic Research Service, 2010-03-01
- Karen R. Polenske, Roberto Guerrero Compeán, Ciro Biderman, "Regional, Economic, and Environmental Implications of Dual Ethanol Technologies in Brazil", 2009-07-13
- Karen R. Polenske, "KICKING AWAY INDUSTRIAL POLICY MYTHS— A Response to Ha-Joon Chang’s Plenary Paper", 2009-06-22
- Karen R. Polenske, Zhan Guo; Ning Ai, "Evaluating environmental and economic benefits of yellow dust storm-related policies in north China", Taylor & Francis, 2008-10-01
- Karen R. Polenske, Ning Ai, "Socioeconomic Impact Analysis of Yellow-dust Storms: An Approach and Case Study for Beijing", Routledge, 2008-06-01
- Karen R. Polenske, Jan Oosterhaven, "Modern regional input–output and impact analyses ", 2008-01-01
- Karen R. Polenske, "Clustering in Space Versus Dispersing Over Space", Springer, 2006-01-01

=== Books ===
- The U.S. Multiregional Input-Output Accounts and Model. Lexington, MA: Lexington Books, D.C. Heath and Company, 1980. Chinese translation published in 1990 by Liaoning Publishing House, Shenyang, Liaoning Province, China.
- State Estimates of Technology, 1963. Lexington, MA: Lexington Books, D.C. Heath and Company, 1974 (jointly with members of research staff).
- State Estimates of the Gross National Product, 1947, 1958, 1963. Lexington, MA: Lexington Books, D.C. Heath and Company, 1972 (jointly with members of research staff).

=== Edited volumes ===
- The Economic Geography of Innovation. 2007. (Cambridge University Press) (Editor)
- Technology-Energy-Environmental-Health (TEEH) Chain in China. 2006. (Springer/Kluwer) (Editor) A Chinese translation was published in 2007.
- Chinese Economic Planning and Input-Output Analysis. Hong Kong: Oxford University Press. 1991. (Co-editor with Chen Xikang.)
- Frontiers of Input-Output Analysis. New York, NY: Oxford University Press, 1989. (Co-editor with Ronald E. Miller and Adam Z. Rose).
- Advances in Input-Output Analysis. Cambridge, MA: Ballinger Publishing Company, 1976 (Co-editor with Jiri V. Skolka).
- Multiregional Input-Output Analysis. Three volumes; Lexington, MA: Lexington Books, D.C. Heath and Company, 1972, 1972, 1973 (Editor).
