= Jackie Chan (disambiguation) =

Jackie Chan (born 1954) is a Hong Kong actor.

Jackie or Jack Chan may also refer to:

- Jackie Chan (politician) (born 1938), former member of the Legislative Council of Hong Kong
- Jackie Chan Hiu-ki (born 1986), better known as Kellyjackie, Hong Kong pop singer
- Jackie Chan (character), in Jackie Chan Adventures
- Jack Chan, character played by Johnny Ngan
- "Jackie Chan" (song), by Tiësto and Dzeko ft. Preme and Post Malone
- Jackie Chan (footballer), Ivanilson Barbosa Chaul (born 1996), Brazilian footballer

== See also ==
- John Chan (disambiguation)
- Jacqui Chan (1934–2026), Chinese-Trinidadian dancer
