= John Chen =

John Chen may refer to:

- John Chen Shi-zhong (1917–2012), Chinese Roman Catholic bishop
- John Chen (pianist) (born 1986), Malaysia-born New Zealand concert pianist
- John S. Chen, CEO of BlackBerry, former CEO of Sybase
- Chen Chwen-jing or Jonathan Chen, Taiwanese politician
- John Chen, a character in Noble House by James Clavell
- John Chen, a hero of the 2022 Laguna Woods shooting

== See also ==
- John Chan (disambiguation)
- John Cheng (1961–2013), Singaporean actor
