= William Colton =

American politician (b. 1946)

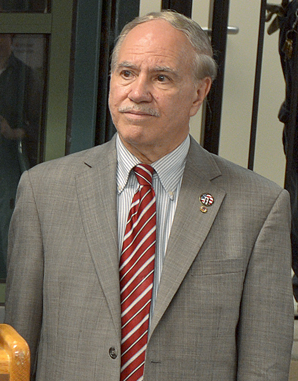
- Colton in 2012

Member of the New York State Assembly from the 47th district
- Incumbent
- Assumed office January 3, 1997
- Preceded by: Frank J. Barbaro

Personal details
- Born: March 6, 1946 (age 80)
- Party: Democratic
- Spouse: Mary
- Education: St. John's University (BA, JD); Brooklyn College (MS)
- Website: State Assembly website

William Colton (born March 6, 1946) is an American politician who represents District 47 in the New York State Assembly, which comprises Bath Beach, Bensonhurst, Gravesend, Dyker Heights, and Midwood.

== Early career ==
He holds a B.A. in degree in Urban Education from St. John's University, an M.S. in Urban Education from Brooklyn College and a J.D. from St. John's School of Law.

According to his self-published biography, Colton is a lifelong resident of the district. Prior to entering the Assembly, Colton worked as a teacher within the New York City public school system, serving as a UFT Chapter Chairperson for six of his eleven years in that occupation, and as a licensed attorney since 1979. Colton is the co-founder and organizer of the Bensonhurst Tenants Council, founder of the Bensonhurst Straphangers Committee and served as an attorney in the lawsuit that successfully prevented the re-opening of the Southwest Brooklyn Incinerator.

== Political career ==
First elected to the Assembly in 1996, Colton currently serves as Majority Whip. He sits on the Correction, Environmental Conservation, Governmental Employees, Labor, Rules, and Ways and Means committees and is a member of the Asian Pacific American Task Force. He has previously served as chair and Vice Chair of the Majority Conference and as Chair of the Legislative Commission on Solid Waste Management. His chief of staff is Larry He.

=== Legislation ===
In the 2019-2020 and the 2021-2022 legislative terms, Colton was the primary sponsor of legislation to make the National Day of the People's Republic of China a public holiday in New York State.

=== Controversy ===
Colton received criticism for a Facebook post he posted on August 9, 2020, calling Black Lives Matter a hate group, comparing it to the Ku Klux Klan. Colton later clarified that he did not think Black Lives Matter was a hate group, but that there were some bad actors within the movement who seek to spread hate, which he said was similar to how the Ku Klux Klan was started by "well intentioned" people until they later turned towards hate. The Black, Puerto Rican, Hispanic, and Asian Legislative Caucus of New York released a statement saying they were "shocked and offended" by Colton's post.

=== Elections ===
Colton has won 14 terms since 1996 and has never been primaried. His closest election occurred in 2022, when he beat Republican Dmitriy Kugel with 54.73% to Kugel's 45.15%.

=== Support for Republicans ===
In the lead up to the 2022 New York state elections, Colton (D) expressed interest in potentially voting for Vito LaBella (R). In 2022, LaBella was the Republican nominee in New York State Senate District 17. In 2023, LaBella lost a Republican primary against Ying Tan for New York City Council District 43. In 2024, LaBella was the Republican nominee in New York State Senate District 26. As of 2025, Vito LaBella is the Chief of Staff & Legislative Director for NYS Senator Steve Chan (R).
