= Faye Duchin =

American economist

- Born: Bayonne, NJ

Academic background
- Education: University of California
- Influences: Wassily Leontief

Academic work
- Discipline: Industrial Ecology
- School or tradition: New Institutional School
- Institutions: Renssalaer Polytechnic Institute
- Website: Information at IDEAS / RePEc

Faye Duchin (/ˈdjuːtʃɪn/; born 1944) is an American computer scientist and professor emeritus of economics at Rensselaer Polytechnic Institute ("RPI"), where she was the dean of the School of Humanities and Social Sciences from 1996 to 2002. She worked in the fields of ecological economics and industrial ecology and employs Input-Output Analysis in her work. Her faculty page at RPI stated that she was "concerned with ways of achieving economic development while avoiding environmental disasters."

== Biography ==
Faye Duchin was raised in Bayonne, New Jersey, attended Cornell University, and received a BA in experimental psychology in 1965. In 1973, she completed a Ph.D. in computer science at UC Berkeley with a dissertation on the newly passed rent control law in Berkeley.

From 1977–1996, Duchin was on the faculty at New York University, where she worked for Nobel laureate Wassily Leontief on input-output economics. In 1985, she became director of the NYU Institute for Economic Analysis, a position she held until 1996 when she left to become dean of the School of Humanities and Social Sciences at Rensselaer Polytechnic Institute. In 2002, Duchin resigned as dean.

== Professional affiliations ==
Duchin served as president of the International Input-Output Association from 2004 to 2006, and is a former vice president of the International Society for Ecological Economics (ISEE). She is a member of the editorial boards of various journals, including the journal of Industrial Ecology, having held this position since the journal's founding in 1997. was one of the founders and a managing editor of the journal Structural Change and Economic Dynamics,

== Scholarly contributions ==
Duchin has stated that she examines factors that could "make a difference in satisfying major global imperatives." She has examined technological change, lifestyle change, quality of life, income distribution, consumption, international trade, natural resource use and environmental degradation using input-output models. She calls her work "problem-oriented rather than discipline- or technique-oriented" and has used an interdisciplinary approach to study sustainability. She claims to study physical realities and constraints, not just monetary values, by using process and engineering data to model technology and resource use.

== Publications ==
- 1983: Military Spending: Facts and Figures, Worldwide Implications and Future Outlook with Wassily Leontief
- 1986: The Future Impact of Automation on Workers with Wassily Leontief
- 1994: The Future of the Environment: Ecological Economics and Technological Change with Glenn-Marie Lange
- 1998: Structural Economics: Measuring Change in Technology, Lifestyles, and the Environment
