= Steve Chan (American politician) =

American politician

- 陳學理
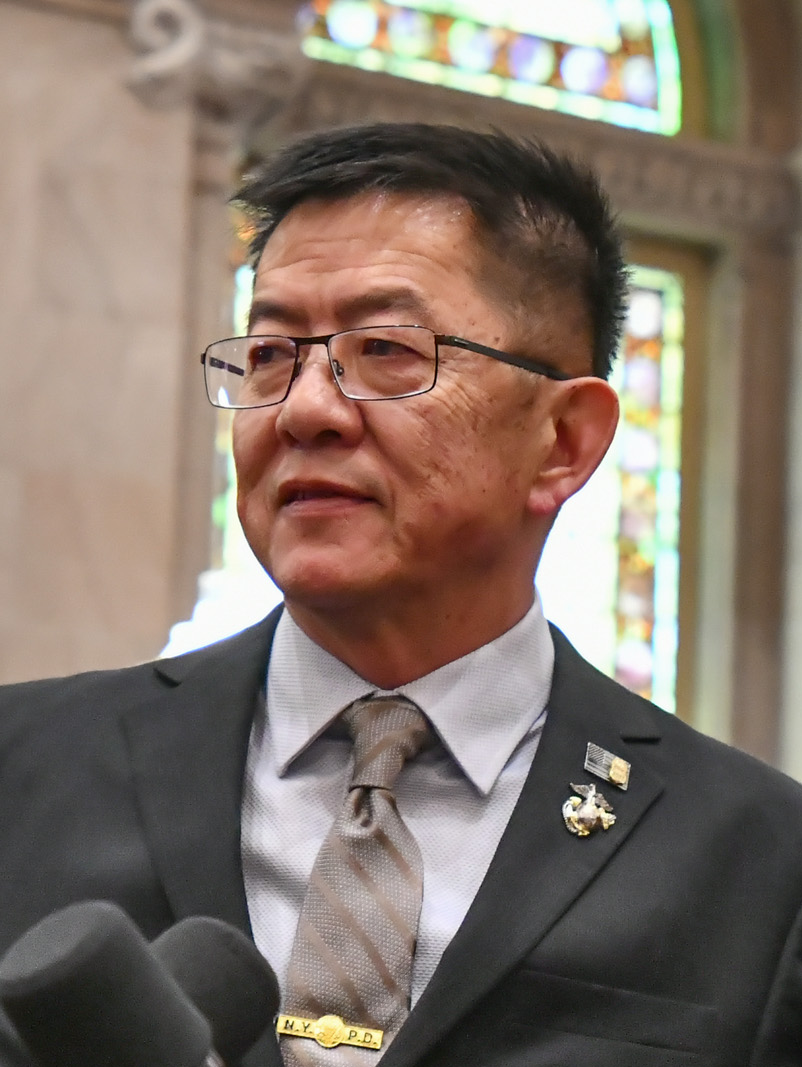
- Chan in 2025

Member of the New York State Senate from the 17th district
- Incumbent
- Assumed office January 1, 2025
- Preceded by: Iwen Chu
- Succeeded by: Larry He

Personal details
- Born: May 13, 1966 (age 60) Hong Kong
- Party: Republican
- Education: Baruch College; Empire State University
- Occupation: U.S. Marine; Pilot; New York City Police Department Sergeant; PTA President; Politician

Military service
- Branch/service: United States Marine Corps
- Years of service: 1984-1990

Stephen Chan (Chinese: 陳學理, born May 13, 1966) is an American politician, former U.S. Marine pilot, PTA president, and former New York City Police Department sergeant who was a former member of the New York State Senate for the 17th district, which comprises part of South Brooklyn.

A Republican, he defeated Democratic incumbent Iwen Chu in 2024.

In the 2026 New York State Senate election, Chan ran against Larry He, the former Asian outreach director to Andrew Cuomo's 2025 mayoral campaign and chief of staff for William Colton. Preliminary vote counts after the close of Election Day showed Steve Chan losing the election to He by over 14 percentage points. That night, Chan left a message conceding the race.

== Electoral history ==
=== 2026 ===
2026 New York State Senate election, District 17
Party	Candidate	Votes	%
Republican	Steve Chan		
Conservative	Steve Chan		
Total	Steve Chan (incumbent)	16,827	42%
Democratic	Larry He	22,786	57%
Write-in			
Total votes		39,613	100%

=== 2024 ===
2024 New York State Senate election, District 17
Party	Candidate	Votes	%
Republican	Steve Chan	27,938	49.5
Conservative	Steve Chan	2,930	5.2
Total	Steve Chan	30,868	54.7
Democratic	Iwen Chu	22,679	40.2
Working Families	Iwen Chu	2,685	4.8
Total	Iwen Chu (incumbent)	25,364	44.9
Write-in		240	0.4
Total votes		56,472	100.0
Republican gain from Democratic			

== See also ==
- Chinese Americans in New York City
