= Joseph Lin (violinist) =

Taiwanese-American violinist

Joseph Lin 林以信
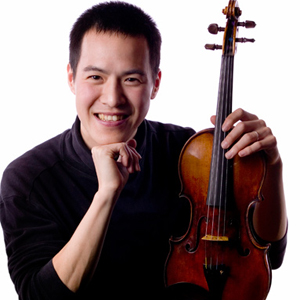

Background information
- Born: 1978
- Genres: Classical
- Occupation(s): Violin teacher, chamber musician
- Instrument: Violin

Joseph Lin (Chinese: 林以信; pinyin: Lín Yǐxìn; born 1978) is a Taiwanese-American violinist. From 2011 to 2018, he was the first violinist of the Juilliard String Quartet. Currently, he is on the violin and chamber music faculty of the Juilliard School in New York City.

== Early life and education ==
Lin was born in the United States to immigrant parents from Taiwan. He attended the Juilliard School Pre-College Division and later graduated magna cum laude from Harvard College in 2000.

== Career ==
Lin has performed with many orchestras, including the Boston Symphony Orchestra, Boston Pops Orchestra, Santa Fe Symphony Orchestra, Kyiv Chamber Orchestra, Moravian Philharmonic, Sapporo Symphony Orchestra, National Symphony Orchestra (Taiwan), New Japan Philharmonic, and the Auckland Symphony Orchestra. As a chamber musician, he appears regularly at several festivals, including Ravinia, Tanglewood, and Marlboro. He was an assistant professor of violin at Cornell University from 2007 to 2011. In 2010 he was appointed first violinist of the Juilliard String Quartet and thus started teaching at Juilliard. At the completion of the 2017–18 season, he stepped down from the Juilliard String Quartet to devote more time to his four young children, while continuing to teach at the Juilliard.

In 1996, he won first prize at the Concert Artists Guild International Competition and was named a Presidential Scholar. In 1999, he was the youngest musician to receive the Pro Musicis International award. A year later, he was a prizewinner in the Hanover International Violin Competition. In 2001, he was the winner of the inaugural edition of the Michael Hill International Violin Competition. In 2006, the Formosa Quartet, of which he was a founding member, won first prize and the Amadeus prize in the London International String Quartet Competition.

Lin began studying violin with Mary Canberg, then with Shirley Givens at Juilliard and Lynn Chang at Harvard.

== See also ==
- Chinese people in New York City
- Taiwanese people in New York City
