= International Input–Output Association =

The International Input–Output Association (IIOA) is a scientific, nonprofit, membership organization to facilitate development of input–output analysis in economics and interdisciplinary areas of inquiry.

Input–output models and analysis in economics were developed by Nobel Laureate Wassily Leontief. Leontief worked from transactions among different industries, such as agriculture, manufacturing and services but for more detailed industries level and embedded in a macroeconomic framework. The field is also known as interindustry economics.

Development includes theoretical advances and improved modeling; empirical applications of input–output models and techniques; and expanded compilation of input–output tables, matrices, and associated accounts, in both national statistical offices and other kinds of venues. Data collection and analysis are carried out at the local and regional levels, for individual countries, and for economies made up of interdependent countries or regions.

== History ==
The IIOA was founded in 1988 growing from an informal international network of economists, government officials, engineers, and managers with interests in the analysis of interdependency in economic and other kinds of systems. It increasingly includes industrial ecologists and other environmental scientists. IIOA hosts biannual conferences and more frequent meetings on specific topics to facilitate networking among its members and other interested parties.

The Association publishes a scholarly journal, Economic Systems Research, and hosts several modes of electronic communication intended to support and encourage research activities and data development.
