= Iwen Chu =

American politician (born 1978)

- 曲怡文
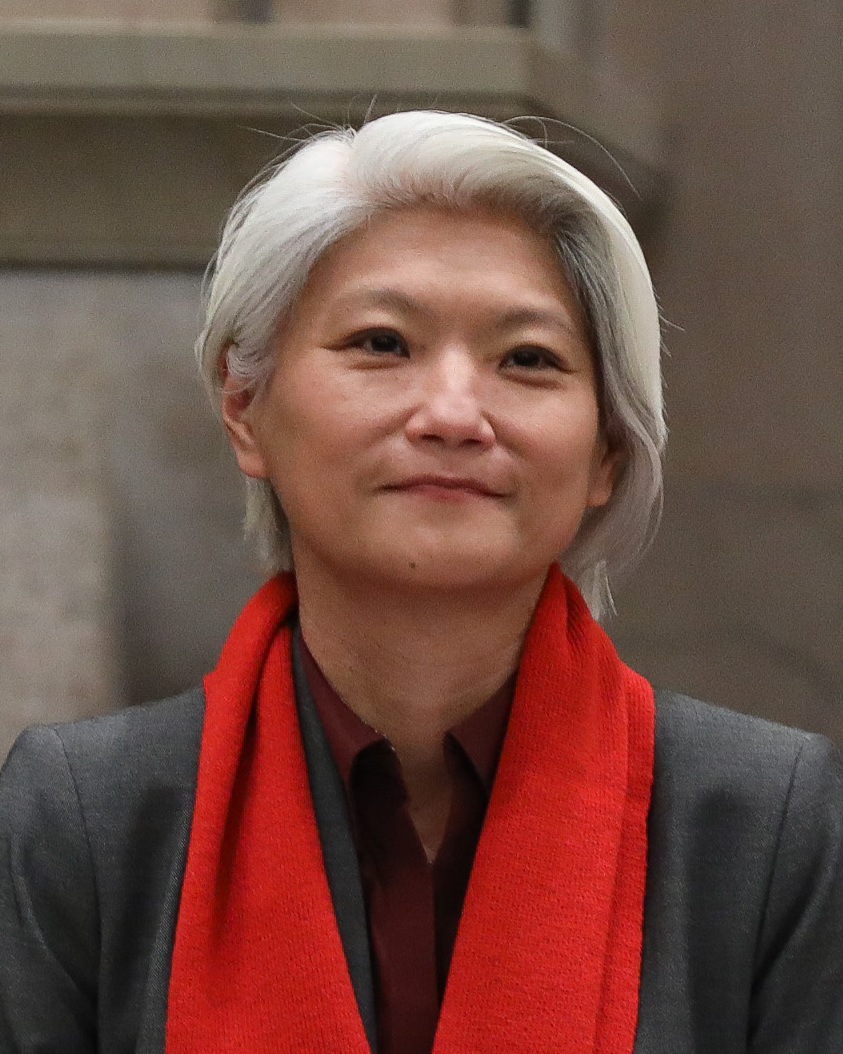
- Chu in 2024

Member of the New York State Senate from the 17th district
- In office January 1, 2023 – December 31, 2024
- Preceded by: Open seat (redistricting)
- Succeeded by: Steve Chan

Personal details
- Born: December 16, 1978 (age 47) Taiwan
- Party: Democratic
- Education: Shih Hsin University (BA); Brooklyn College (MA)
- Website: Campaign website Official website

Iwen Chu (Chinese: 曲怡文; born December 16, 1978) is a Taiwanese-American politician who served as a member of the New York State Senate for the 17th district from 2023 to 2024. A Democrat, she is the first Asian American woman to be elected to the state senate.

== Early life and education ==
Chu was born and raised in Taiwan. After graduating from Shih Hsin University in 2000, she worked for Chung T'ien Television and moved to New York at the age of 27 to pursue a Master of Arts (M.A.) in sociology at Brooklyn College.

== Career ==
Chu previously worked as chief of staff to former state assemblymember Peter Abbate and as a reporter for World Journal. She previously served as a member of Community Board 11 and Community Education Council District 20.

After announcing it would not make an endorsement in the 2025 New York City Democratic mayoral primary, The New York Times convened a panel of civic leaders including Chu to provide commentary on the candidates. She ranked Brad Lander as the best candidate overall and detracted from Zohran Mamdani, saying "Even though my heart wants to agree with him [Mamdani], my brain tells me I can’t. You need to spend the money on things you need. Unfortunately, I don’t see his policy as a viable option for New Yorkers."

== New York State Senate ==
In 2022, Chu ran for the New York Senate in the newly drawn 17th district which includes the South Brooklyn communities of South Slope, Windsor Terrace, Kensington, Sunset Park, Borough Park, Dyker Heights, Bensonhurst and Gravesend. She defeated Republican candidate Vito LaBella in a close race.

In 2024, she lost her re-election bid to Republican candidate Steve Chan. Democrats thus lost their supermajority in the body.

In June 2025, City & State reported that Chu had filed to run for an undeclared state office and established an exploratory committee.

== Personal life ==
Chu lives with her husband and daughter in Dyker Heights.

== See also ==
- Chinese Americans in New York City
- Taiwanese Americans in New York City
