= New York's 17th State Senate district =

American legislative district

Senator
Steve Chan; R–Bensonhurst
- Registration: 57.6% Democratic; 16.7% Republican; 23.0% No party preference
- Demographics: 32% White; 2% Black; 19% Hispanic; 44% Asian; 1% Hawaiian/Pacific Islander; 3% Other
- Population (2022): 293,218
- Registered voters: 155,905

New York's 17th State Senate district is one of 63 districts in the New York State Senate. It has been represented by Republican Steve Chan since 2025, defeating Iwen Chu.

== Geography ==
District 17 is located in Southwestern Brooklyn, including some or all of the neighborhoods of Bath Beach, Bay Ridge, Sunset Park, Kensington, Dyker Heights, Bensonhurst, and Gravesend.

The district overlaps with New York's 7th, 9th, 10th, and 11th congressional districts, and with the 41st, 42nd, 44th, 45th, 47th, 48th, 49th, and 51st districts of the New York State Assembly.

== Recent election results ==
=== 2026 ===
2026 New York State Senate election, District 17
Party	Candidate	Votes	%
Republican	Steve Chan		
Conservative	Steve Chan		
Stop Mamdani	Steve Chan		
Total	Steve Chan (incumbent)		
Democratic	Larry He		
Write-in			
Total votes			100.0

=== 2024 ===
2024 New York State Senate election, District 17
Party	Candidate	Votes	%
Republican	Steve Chan	27,938	
Conservative	Steve Chan	2,930	
Total	Steve Chan	30,868	54.7
Democratic	Iwen Chu	22,679	
Working Families	Iwen Chu	2,685	
Total	Iwen Chu (incumbent)	25,364	44.9
Write-in		240	0.4
Total votes		56,472	100.0
Republican gain from Democratic			

=== 2022 ===
2022 New York State Senate election, District 17
Party	Candidate	Votes	%
Democratic	Iwen Chu	16,167	
Working Families	Iwen Chu	2,195	
Total	Iwen Chu	18,362	50.7
Republican	Vito LaBella	16,659	
Conservative	Vito LaBella	1,169	
Total	Vito LaBella	17,828	49.2
Write-in		57	0.1
Total votes		36,243	100.0
Democratic win (new boundaries)			

=== 2020 ===
2020 New York State Senate election, District 17
Party	Candidate	Votes	%
Republican	Simcha Felder	42,332	
Democratic	Simcha Felder	31,476	
Conservative	Simcha Felder	4,842	
Total	Simcha Felder (incumbent)	78,650	97.8
Write-in		1,730	2.2
Total votes		80,380	100.0
Democratic hold			

As he had done in the past, Felder ran in 2020 on both the Democratic and Republican party lines.

=== 2018 ===
2018 New York State Senate election, District 17
Primary election
Party	Candidate	Votes	%
Democratic	Simcha Felder (incumbent)	15,589	65.4
Democratic	Blake Morris	8,200	34.4
Write-in		39	0.2
Total votes		23,828	100.0
General election
Democratic	Simcha Felder	20,585	
Republican	Simcha Felder	18,152	
Conservative	Simcha Felder	2,283	
Independence	Simcha Felder	733	
Total	Simcha Felder (incumbent)	41,544	84.3
Working Families	Jumaane Williams	6,611	13.4
Reform	Luis Rivera	733	1.5
Write-in		395	0.8
Total votes		49,283	100.0
Democratic hold			

Jumaane Williams, then a New York City Councilmember, did not actively campaign, and was listed on the ballot to allow the Working Families Party to remove him from consideration for the 2018 lieutenant gubernatorial election, in accordance with complex New York election laws.

=== 2016 ===
2016 New York State Senate election, District 17
Party	Candidate	Votes	%
Democratic	Simcha Felder	35,432	
Republican	Simcha Felder	23,560	
Conservative	Simcha Felder	4,010	
Total	Simcha Felder (incumbent)	63,002	99.1
Write-in		555	0.9
Total votes		63,557	100.0
Democratic hold			

In 2016, Felder ran on both the Democratic and Republican party lines.

=== 2014 ===
2014 New York State Senate election, District 17
Party	Candidate	Votes	%
Democratic	Simcha Felder	21,384	
Conservative	Simcha Felder	8,105	
Total	Simcha Felder (incumbent)	29,489	98.8
Write-in		355	1.2
Total votes		29,844	100.0
Democratic hold			

=== 2012 ===
2012 New York State Senate election, District 17
Primary election
Party	Candidate	Votes	%
Democratic	Simcha Felder	6,643	81.5
Democratic	Abraham Tischler	1,427	17.5
Write-in		82	1.0
Total votes		8,152	100.0
Conservative	Simcha Felder (write-in)	113	53.6
Conservative	David Storobin (incumbent)	98	46.4
Write-in		0	0.0
Total votes		211	100.0
General election
Democratic	Simcha Felder	32,759	
Conservative	Simcha Felder	6,135	
Tax Cuts Now	Simcha Felder	372	
Total	Simcha Felder	39,266	66.2
Republican	David Storobin (incumbent)	19,338	32.6
School Choice	Abraham Tischler	528	0.9
Write-in		155	0.3
Total votes		59,287	100.0
Democratic gain from Republican			

=== Federal results in District 17 ===
Year	Office	Results
2020	President	Trump 61 – 38%
2016	President	Trump 52.8 – 44.7%
2012	President	Romney 58.3 – 40.8%
2012	Senate	Gillibrand 61.2 – 37.5%
