= 2018 New York State Senate election =

- November 6, 2018

All 63 seats in the New York State Senate 32 seats needed for a majority
- Turnout: 45.59%
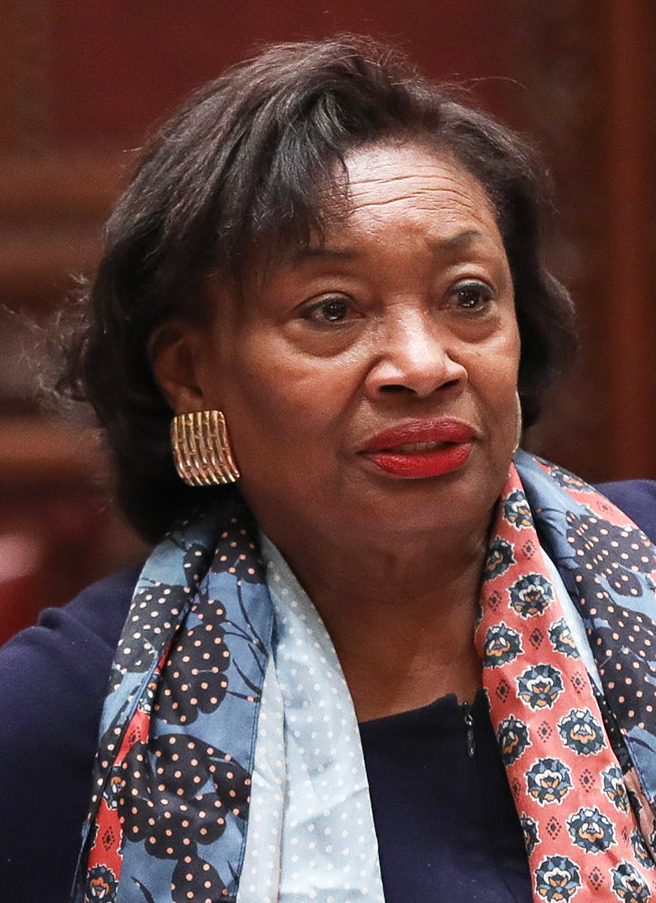

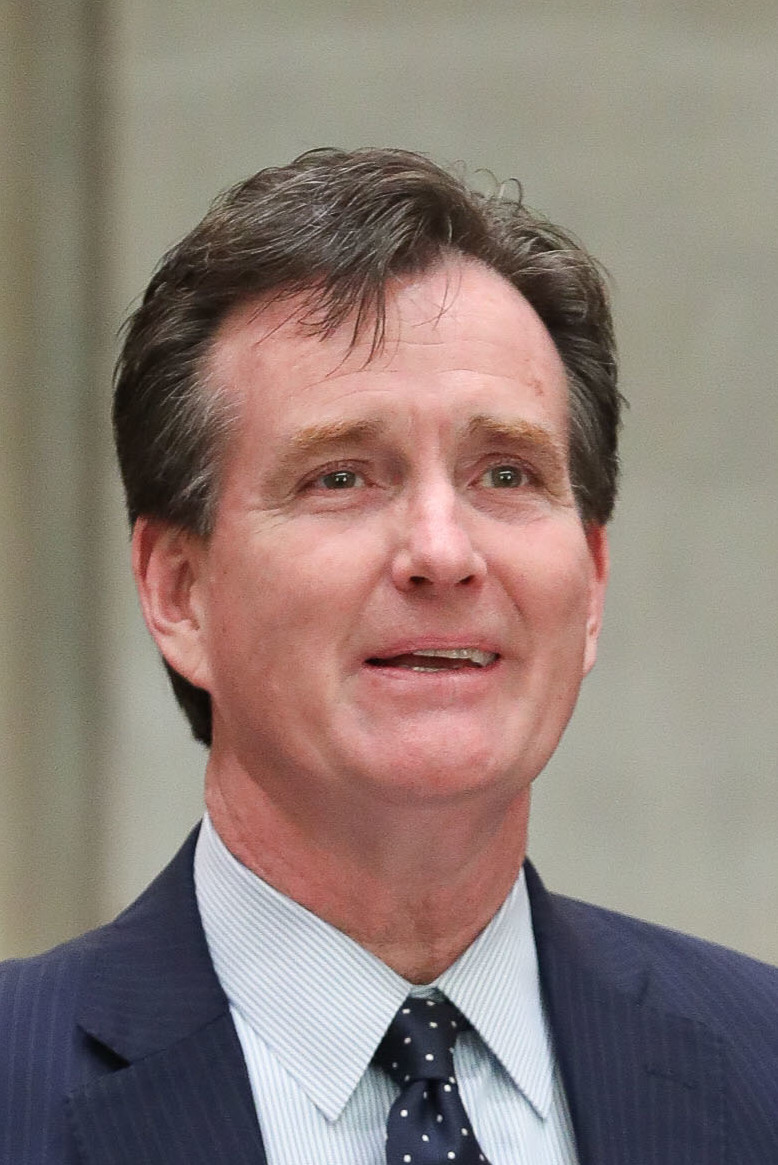
	Majority party	Minority party
Leader	Andrea Stewart-Cousins	John J. Flanagan
Party	Democratic	Republican
Leader's seat	35th District	2nd District
Seats before	31	32 (Note: This figure includes Democratic Senator Simcha Felder, an enrolled Democrat who caucused with the Senate Republican Conference from 2013 to 2018.)
Seats won	39 (Note: This figure does not include Senator Simcha Felder, an enrolled Democrat who caucused with the Senate Republican Conference from 2013 to 2018, and was barred from joining the Senate Democratic Conference in December 2018.)	23
Seat change	▲8	▼8
Popular vote	3,242,586	1,926,123
Percentage	55.98%	33.25%
Swing	▲4.48%	▼3.27%
- Democratic gain Republican gain Democratic hold Republican hold 50–60% 60–70% 70–80% 80–90% >90% 50–60% 60–70% 80–90% >90%
Temporary President and Majority Leader before election
John J. Flanagan
Republican
Temporary President and Majority Leader
Andrea Stewart-Cousins
Democratic

The 2018 New York State Senate elections were held on November 6, 2018, to elect representatives from all 63 State Senate districts in the U.S. state of New York. Primary elections were held on September 13, 2018.

In April 2018, The Wall Street Journal described the state senate as the "last bastion of power" of the Republican Party in the State of New York. The coalition of Republicans and members of the Independent Democratic Conference collapsed in 2018, with 7 of the 8 IDC members returning to the Democratic Caucus. Democrat Simcha Felder, however, continued to caucus with the Republicans, giving them control of the chamber with only 31 seats. On Election Day, Democrats gained control of the chamber from the Republicans by picking up eight seats.

The following day, The New York Times wrote that the Democrats had "decisively evict[ed] Republicans from running the State Senate, which they [had] controlled for all but three years since World War II". Enrolled Democrats won 40 of the chamber's 63 seats, including all but one seat in New York City and six of the nine seats on Long Island, the latter of which had been under total Republican control since the early 1970s. Brooklyn Senator Simcha Felder, a Democrat who had previously caucused with the Republicans, sought to rejoin the Senate Democratic Conference, but was turned down in December 2018; he was later accepted into the Conference on July 1, 2019.

The Democrats' election victories made possible the January 2019 election of Andrea Stewart-Cousins as the first female Majority Leader and Temporary President in the chamber's history.

== Party composition ==
Affiliation	Party (Shading indicates majority caucus)			Total
Affiliation	Democratic		Republican	Total
Affiliation	Mainline Caucus	SF (Note: The "SF" column refers to Senator Simcha Felder, an enrolled Democrat who caucused with the Senate Republican Conference from 2013 to 2018 and was barred from joining the Senate Democratic Conference in December 2018.)	Republican	Total
End 2017-2018 session	31	1	31	63
Begin 2019-2020 session	39	1	23	63
Latest voting share	61.9%	1.6%	36.5%	

The vote totals for each party were:

Party	Votes	Percentage	Swing
Democratic	3,242,586	55.98%	▲4.48%
Republican	1,926,123	33.25%	▼3.27%
Conservative	253,452	4.38%	▼0.69%
Independence	155,542	2.69%	▼0.38%
Working Families	143,776	2.48%	▲0.40%
Women's Equality	33,835	0.58%	▲0.11%
Reform	25,362	0.44%	▼0.12%
Green	10,539	0.18%	▼0.36%
Stop de Blasio	415	0.01%	New
Upstate Jobs	347	0.01%	New
Tax Revolt	278	0.00%	▼0.02%

== Results ==
District	Incumbent	Party	Elected Senator	Party
1	Kenneth LaValle	Rep	Kenneth LaValle	Rep
2	John J. Flanagan	Rep	John J. Flanagan	Rep
3	Thomas Croci	Rep	Monica Martinez	Dem
4	Phil Boyle	Rep	Phil Boyle	Rep
5	Carl L. Marcellino	Rep	Jim Gaughran	Dem
6	Kemp Hannon	Rep	Kevin Thomas	Dem
7	Elaine Phillips	Rep	Anna Kaplan	Dem
8	John Brooks	Dem	John Brooks	Dem
9	Todd Kaminsky	Dem	Todd Kaminsky	Dem
10	James Sanders Jr.	Dem	James Sanders Jr.	Dem
11	Tony Avella	Dem (Note: Member of the former Independent Democratic Conference.)	John Liu	Dem
12	Michael Gianaris	Dem	Michael Gianaris	Dem
13	Jose Peralta	Dem	Jessica Ramos	Dem
14	Leroy Comrie	Dem	Leroy Comrie	Dem
15	Joseph Addabbo Jr.	Dem	Joseph Addabbo Jr.	Dem
16	Toby Ann Stavisky	Dem	Toby Ann Stavisky	Dem
17	Simcha Felder	Dem (Note: Caucusing with the Republicans.)	Simcha Felder	Dem (Note: Not a member of the Democratic majority.)
18	Martin Malave Dilan	Dem	Julia Salazar	Dem
19	Roxanne Persaud	Dem	Roxanne Persaud	Dem
20	Jesse Hamilton	Dem	Zellnor Myrie	Dem
21	Kevin Parker	Dem	Kevin Parker	Dem
22	Martin Golden	Rep	Andrew Gounardes	Dem
23	Diane Savino	Dem	Diane Savino	Dem
24	Andrew Lanza	Rep	Andrew Lanza	Rep
25	Velmanette Montgomery	Dem	Velmanette Montgomery	Dem
26	Brian P. Kavanagh	Dem	Brian P. Kavanagh	Dem
27	Brad Hoylman	Dem	Brad Hoylman	Dem
28	Liz Krueger	Dem	Liz Krueger	Dem
29	Jose M. Serrano	Dem	Jose M. Serrano	Dem
30	Brian Benjamin	Dem	Brian Benjamin	Dem
31	Marisol Alcantara	Dem	Robert Jackson	Dem
32	Luis R. Sepúlveda	Dem	Luis R. Sepúlveda	Dem
33	Gustavo Rivera	Dem	Gustavo Rivera	Dem
34	Jeffrey D. Klein	Dem	Alessandra Biaggi	Dem
35	Andrea Stewart-Cousins	Dem	Andrea Stewart-Cousins	Dem
36	Jamaal Bailey	Dem	Jamaal Bailey	Dem
37	Shelley Mayer	Dem	Shelley Mayer	Dem
38	David Carlucci	Dem	David Carlucci	Dem
39	William J. Larkin Jr.	Rep	James Skoufis	Dem
40	Terrence Murphy	Rep	Peter Harckham	Dem
41	Sue Serino	Rep	Sue Serino	Rep
42	John Bonacic	Rep	Jen Metzger	Dem
43	Kathy Marchione	Rep	Daphne Jordan	Rep
44	Neil Breslin	Dem	Neil Breslin	Dem
45	Betty Little	Rep	Betty Little	Rep
46	George A. Amedore Jr.	Rep	George A. Amedore Jr.	Rep
47	Joseph Griffo	Rep	Joseph Griffo	Rep
48	Patty Ritchie	Rep	Patty Ritchie	Rep
49	Jim Tedisco	Rep	Jim Tedisco	Rep
50	John DeFrancisco	Rep	Bob Antonacci	Rep
51	James Seward	Rep	James Seward	Rep
52	Fred Akshar	Rep	Fred Akshar	Rep
53	David Valesky	Dem	Rachel May	Dem
54	Pam Helming	Rep	Pam Helming	Rep
55	Richard Funke	Rep	Richard Funke	Rep
56	Joseph Robach	Rep	Joseph Robach	Rep
57	Catharine Young	Rep	Catharine Young	Rep
58	Tom O'Mara	Rep	Tom O'Mara	Rep
59	Patrick Gallivan	Rep	Patrick Gallivan	Rep
60	Chris Jacobs	Rep	Chris Jacobs	Rep
61	Michael Ranzenhofer	Rep	Michael Ranzenhofer	Rep
62	Robert Ortt	Rep	Robert Ortt	Rep
63	Timothy Kennedy	Dem	Timothy Kennedy	Dem

== Retiring incumbents ==
Five incumbent Republican senators did not seek re-election in 2018. They were:

- Thomas Croci (R), District 3
- William J. Larkin Jr. (R), District 39
- John Bonacic (R), District 42
- Kathy Marchione (R), District 43
- John A. DeFrancisco (R), District 50

== Incumbents defeated ==
=== In primary ===
Seven incumbent senators (all Democrats) ran for re-election, but were defeated in the September 13 primaries. They were:

- Tony Avella (D-District 11)
- Jose Peralta (D-District 13)
- Martin Malave Dilan (D-District 18)
- Jesse Hamilton (D-District 20)
- Marisol Alcantara (D-District 31)
- Jeffrey D. Klein (D-District 34)
- David Valesky (D-District 53)

With the exception of Sen. Dilan, all seven had been members of the Independent Democratic Conference.

=== In general election ===
The following Republican incumbents were defeated on election day:

- Carl L. Marcellino (R-District 5)
- Kemp Hannon (R-District 6)
- Elaine Phillips (R-District 7)
- Martin Golden (R-District 22)
- Terrence Murphy (R-District 40)

The six Democratic members of the IDC who were defeated in the September primaries (Sens. Avella, Peralta, Hamilton, Alcantara, Klein, and Valesky) were also on the ballot in November, on either the Independence Party line, the Women's Equality Party line, or both (Sen. Peralta also received votes on the Reform Party line). None of the six was re-elected.

== Predictions ==
Source	Ranking	As of
Governing	Lean D (flip)	October 8, 2018

== Detailed results ==
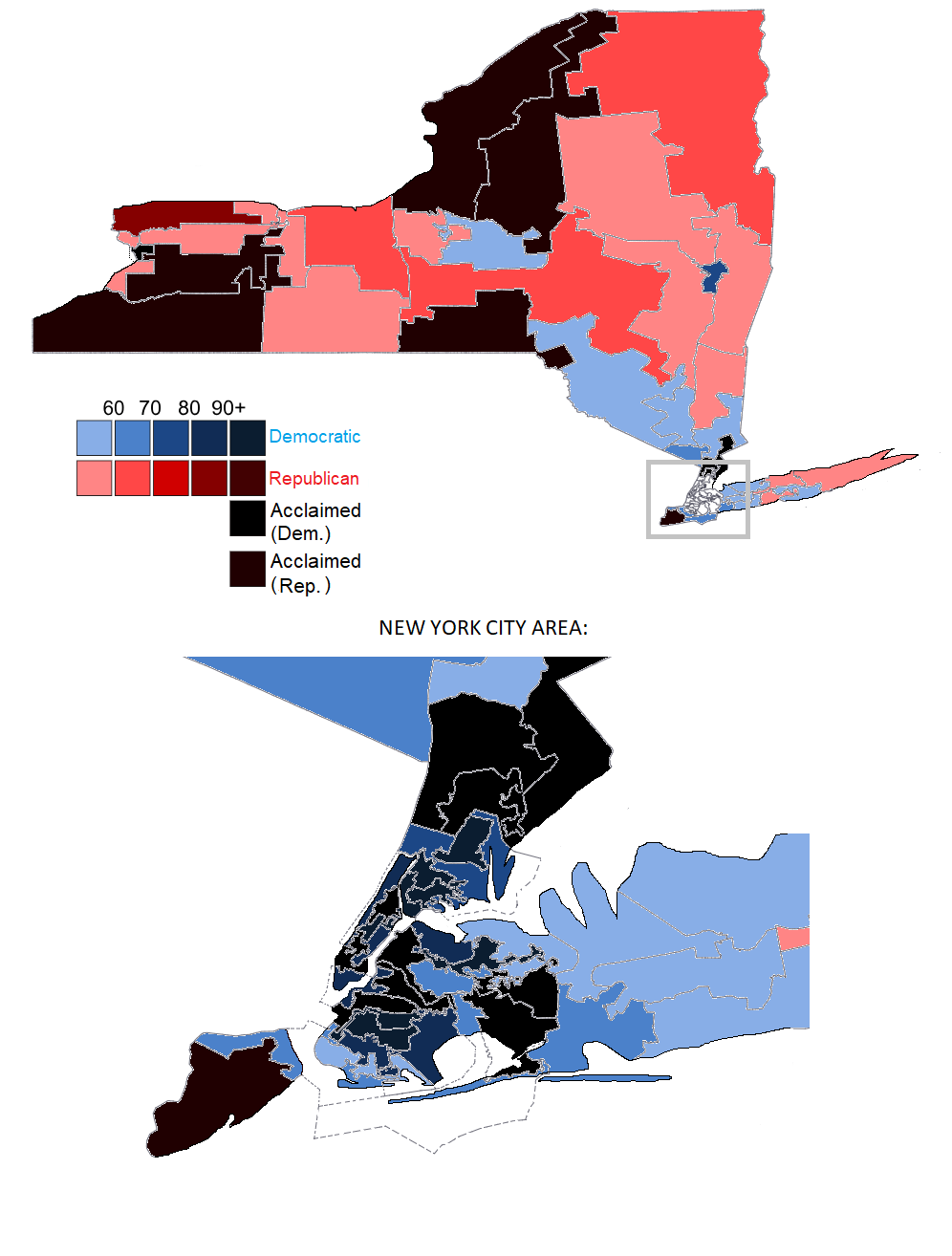
Vote share of each candidate by main party per district. Candidates can run on multiple parties in New York; the shading is the sum of votes a candidate received for all parties, although only the main party is used for shading. Simcha Felder is considered a Democrat for purposes of this map.

- The New York State Board of Elections only publishes results for contested primary elections.

=== District 1 ===
New York's 1st State Senate district, 2018
Party	Candidate	Votes	%
Republican	Kenneth LaValle	60,586	48.5
Conservative	Kenneth LaValle	6,920	5.6
Independence	Kenneth LaValle	3,150	2.5
Reform	Kenneth LaValle	361	0.3
Total	Kenneth LaValle (incumbent)	71,017	56.9
Democratic	Greg Fischer	53,790	43.1
Total votes		124,807	100.0
Republican hold			

=== District 2 ===
New York's 2nd State Senate district, 2018
Party	Candidate	Votes	%
Republican	John J. Flanagan	57,621	47.9
Conservative	John J. Flanagan	6,682	5.5
Independence	John J. Flanagan	1,524	1.3
Reform	John J. Flanagan	227	0.2
Total	John J. Flanagan (incumbent)	66,054	54.9
Democratic	Kathleen Cleary	52,861	44.0
Women's Equality	Kathleen Cleary	1,291	1.1
Total	Kathleen Cleary	54,152	45.1
Total votes		120,206	100.0
Republican hold			

=== District 3 ===
The 3rd district is located on Long Island and includes Medford, Ronkonkoma, and Sayville. Republican Thomas Croci had represented this district since 2015. Croci did not run for reelection.

New York's 3rd State Senate district, 2018
Party	Candidate	Votes	%
Democratic	Monica Martinez	46,967	49.3
Working Families	Monica Martinez	1,428	1.5
Women's Equality	Monica Martinez	765	0.8
Total	Monica Martinez	49,160	51.6
Republican	Dean Murray	40,195	42.2
Conservative	Dean Murray	4,798	5.0
Independence	Dean Murray	960	1.0
Reform	Dean Murray	211	0.2
Total	Dean Murray	46,164	48.4
Total votes		95,320	100.0
Democratic gain from Republican			

=== District 4 ===
New York's 4th State Senate district, 2018
Party	Candidate	Votes	%
Republican	Phil Boyle	46,143	45.3
Conservative	Phil Boyle	5,172	5.1
Independence	Phil Boyle	1,247	1.2
Reform	Phil Boyle	205	0.2
Total	Phil Boyle (incumbent)	52,767	51.8
Democratic	Lou D'Amaro	47,294	46.4
Working Families	Lou D'Amaro	1,194	1.2
Women's Equality	Lou D'Amaro	643	0.6
Total	Lou D'Amaro	49,131	48.2
Total votes		101,898	100.0
Republican hold			

=== District 5 ===
New York's 5th State Senate district, 2018
Party	Candidate	Votes	%
Democratic	Jim Gaughran	65,673	53.0
Working Families	Jim Gaughran	1,465	1.2
Women's Equality	Jim Gaughran	889	0.7
Total	Jim Gaughran	68,027	54.9
Republican	Carl L. Marcellino	49,411	39.9
Conservative	Carl L. Marcellino	5,223	4.2
Independence	Carl L. Marcellino	952	0.8
Reform	Carl L. Marcellino	239	0.2
Total	Carl L. Marcellino (incumbent)	55,825	45.1
Total votes		123,852	100.0
Democratic gain from Republican			

=== District 6 ===
In an unexpected upset, Democratic challenger Kevin Thomas defeated Republican incumbent Kemp Hannon.

New York's 6th State Senate district, 2018
Party	Candidate	Votes	%
Democratic	Kevin Thomas	53,630	49.4
Working Families	Kevin Thomas	1,028	0.9
Women's Equality	Kevin Thomas	546	0.5
Total	Kevin Thomas	55,204	50.8
Republican	Kemp Hannon	47,510	43.7
Conservative	Kemp Hannon	4,906	4.5
Independence	Kemp Hannon	810	0.8
Reform	Kemp Hannon	170	0.2
Total	Kemp Hannon (incumbent)	53,396	49.2
Total votes		108,600	100.0
Democratic gain from Republican			

=== District 7 ===
New York's 7th State Senate district, 2018
Party	Candidate	Votes	%
Democratic	Anna Kaplan	60,969	53.6
Working Families	Anna Kaplan	1,120	1.0
Women's Equality	Anna Kaplan	588	0.5
Total	Anna Kaplan	62,677	55.1
Republican	Elaine Phillips	46,115	40.5
Conservative	Elaine Phillips	3,959	3.5
Independence	Elaine Phillips	771	0.7
Reform	Elaine Phillips	230	0.2
Total	Elaine Phillips (incumbent)	51,075	44.9
Total votes		113,752	100.0
Democratic gain from Republican			

=== District 8 ===
New York's 8th State Senate district, 2018
Party	Candidate	Votes	%
Democratic	John Brooks	61,784	53.2
Working Families	John Brooks	1,240	1.1
Women's Equality	John Brooks	655	0.5
Total	John Brooks (incumbent)	63,679	54.8
Republican	Jeffrey Pravato	46,719	40.2
Conservative	Jeffrey Pravato	4,831	4.2
Independence	Jeffrey Pravato	764	0.7
Reform	Jeffrey Pravato	174	0.1
Total	Jeffrey Pravato	52,488	45.2
Total votes		116,167	100.0
Democratic hold			

=== District 9 ===
Democrat Todd Kaminsky was first elected in a 2016 special election.

==== Reform primary ====
Reform primary results
Party	Candidate	Votes	%
Reform	Todd Kaminsky (incumbent)	505	79.8
Reform	Francis Becker Jr.	114	18.0
Reform	Other	14	2.2
Total votes		633	100.0

==== General election ====
New York's 9th State Senate district, 2018
Party	Candidate	Votes	%
Democratic	Todd Kaminsky	70,538	59.4
Working Families	Todd Kaminsky	1,110	0.9
Independence	Todd Kaminsky	918	0.8
Women's Equality	Todd Kaminsky	693	0.6
Reform	Todd Kaminsky	153	0.1
Total	Todd Kaminsky (incumbent)	73,412	61.8
Republican	Francis Becker Jr.	41,095	34.6
Conservative	Francis Becker Jr.	4,044	3.4
Tax Revolt	Francis Becker Jr.	278	0.2
Total	Francis Becker Jr.	45,417	38.2
Total votes		118,829	100.0
Democratic hold			

=== District 10 ===
New York's 10th State Senate district, 2018
Party	Candidate	Votes	%
Democratic	James Sanders Jr.	62,095	97.5
Working Families	James Sanders Jr.	1,461	2.3
Reform	James Sanders Jr.	148	0.2
Total	James Sanders Jr. (incumbent)	63,704	100.0
Total votes		63,704	100.0
Democratic hold			

=== District 11 ===
==== Democratic primary ====
- Tony Avella, incumbent
- John Liu, former New York City Comptroller

Democratic primary results
Party	Candidate	Votes	%
Democratic	John Liu	12,578	52.3
Democratic	Tony Avella (incumbent)	11,489	47.7
Total votes		24,067	100.0

==== Republican primary ====
Republican primary results
Party	Candidate	Votes	%
Republican	Vickie Paladino	1,735	56.7
Republican	Simon Minching	1,323	43.3
Total votes		3,058	100.0

==== General election ====
New York's 11th State Senate district, 2018
Party	Candidate	Votes	%
Democratic	John Liu	42,047	53.6
Republican	Vickie Paladino	19,062	24.3
Independence	Tony Avella	15,528	19.8
Women's Equality	Tony Avella	713	0.9
Total	Tony Avella (incumbent)	16,241	20.7
Conservative	Simon Minching	1,123	1.4
Total votes		78,473	100.0
Democratic hold			

=== District 12 ===
==== Reform primary ====
Reform primary results
Party	Candidate	Votes	%
Reform	Opportunity to Ballot	162	100.0
Total votes		162	100.0

==== General election ====
New York's 12th State Senate district, 2018
Party	Candidate	Votes	%
Democratic	Michael Gianaris	65,892	91.6
Working Families	Michael Gianaris	6,076	8.4
Total	Michael Gianaris (incumbent)	71,968	100.0
Total votes		71,968	100.0
Democratic hold			

=== District 13 ===
==== Democratic primary ====
- Jose Peralta, incumbent
- Jessica Ramos, community activist

Democratic primary results
Party	Candidate	Votes	%
Democratic	Jessica Ramos	12,550	54.8
Democratic	Jose Peralta (incumbent)	10,362	45.2
Total votes		22,912	100.0

==== General election ====
New York's 13th State Senate district, 2018
Party	Candidate	Votes	%
Democratic	Jessica Ramos	41,573	85.9
Working Families	Jessica Ramos	1,886	3.9
Total	Jessica Ramos	43,459	89.8
Independence	Jose Peralta	3,769	7.8
Reform	Jose Peralta	766	1.6
Women's Equality	Jose Peralta	404	0.8
Total	Jose Peralta (incumbent)	4,939	10.2
Total votes		48,398	100.0
Democratic hold			

=== District 14 ===
New York's 14th State Senate district, 2018
Party	Candidate	Votes	%
Democratic	Leroy Comrie	76,188	97.2
Working Families	Leroy Comrie	1,972	2.5
Reform	Leroy Comrie	217	0.3
Total	Leroy Comrie (incumbent)	78,377	100.0
Total votes		78,377	100.0
Democratic hold			

=== District 15 ===
==== Republican primary ====
Republican primary results
Party	Candidate	Votes	%
Republican	Thomas Sullivan	3,377	67.8
Republican	Slawomir Platta	1,602	32.2
Total votes		4,979	100.0

==== Reform primary ====
Reform primary results
Party	Candidate	Votes	%
Reform	Opportunity to Ballot	285	100.0
Total votes		285	100.0

==== General election ====
New York's 15th State Senate district, 2018
Party	Candidate	Votes	%
Democratic	Joseph Addabbo	44,706	61.0
Working Families	Joseph Addabbo	2,262	3.1
Total	Joseph Addabbo Jr. (incumbent)	46,968	64.1
Republican	Thomas Sullivan	22,729	31.0
Conservative	Thomas Sullivan	2,762	3.8
Independence	Thomas Sullivan	611	0.8
Reform	Thomas Sullivan	179	0.3
Total	Thomas Sullivan	26,281	35.9
Total votes		73,249	100.0
Democratic hold			

=== District 16 ===
New York's 16th State Senate district, 2018
Party	Candidate	Votes	%
Democratic	Toby Ann Stavisky	39,951	89.0
Working Families	Toby Ann Stavisky	2,201	4.9
Women's Equality	Toby Ann Stavisky	664	1.5
Total	Toby Ann Stavisky (incumbent)	42,816	95.4
Reform	Vincent Pazienza	2,053	4.6
Total votes		44,869	100.0
Democratic hold			

=== District 17 ===
==== Democratic primary ====
- Simcha Felder, incumbent
- Blake Morris, attorney

Democratic primary results
Party	Candidate	Votes	%
Democratic	Simcha Felder (incumbent)	15,589	65.5
Democratic	Blake Morris	8,200	34.5
Total votes		23,789	100.0

==== General election ====
New York's 17th State Senate district, 2018
Party	Candidate	Votes	%
Democratic	Simcha Felder	20,585	42.1
Republican	Simcha Felder	18,152	37.1
Conservative	Simcha Felder	2,283	4.7
Independence	Simcha Felder	524	1.1
Total	Simcha Felder (incumbent)	41,544	85.0
Working Families	Jumaane Williams	6,611	13.5
Reform	Luis Rivera	733	1.5
Total votes		48,888	100.0
Democratic hold			

=== District 18 ===
==== Democratic primary ====
- Martin Malave Dilan, incumbent
- Julia Salazar, political activist

Democratic primary results
Party	Candidate	Votes	%
Democratic	Julia Salazar	21,419	58.9
Democratic	Martin Malave Dilan (incumbent)	14,974	41.1
Total votes		36,393	100.0

==== General election ====
New York's 18th State Senate district, 2018
Party	Candidate	Votes	%
Democratic	Julia Salazar	71,329	100.0
Total votes		71,329	100.0
Democratic hold			

=== District 19 ===
New York's 19th State Senate district, 2018
Party	Candidate	Votes	%
Democratic	Roxanne Persaud	68,041	88.2
Working Families	Roxanne Persaud	1,279	1.7
Total	Roxanne Persaud (incumbent)	69,320	89.9
Republican	Jeffrey J. Ferretti	7,117	9.2
Conservative	Jeffrey J. Ferretti	703	0.9
Total	Jeffrey J. Ferretti	7,820	10.1
Total votes		77,140	100.0
Democratic hold			

=== District 20 ===
==== Democratic primary ====
- Jesse Hamilton, incumbent
- Zellnor Myrie, lawyer and former legislative director in New York City Council

Democratic primary results
Party	Candidate	Votes	%
Democratic	Zellnor Myrie	23,784	54.0
Democratic	Jesse Hamilton (incumbent)	20,266	46.0
Total votes		44,050	100.0

==== General election ====
New York's 20th State Senate district, 2018
Party	Candidate	Votes	%
Democratic	Zellnor Myrie	67,683	85.8
Working Families	Zellnor Myrie	5,491	6.9
Total	Zellnor Myrie	73,174	92.7
Independence	Jesse Hamilton	4,983	6.3
Women's Equality	Jesse Hamilton	745	1.0
Total	Jesse Hamilton (incumbent)	5,728	7.3
Total votes		78,902	100.0
Democratic hold			

=== District 21 ===
New York's 21st State Senate district, 2018
Party	Candidate	Votes	%
Democratic	Kevin Parker	85,830	88.2
Working Families	Kevin Parker	8,627	8.8
Total	Kevin Parker (incumbent)	94,457	97.0
Conservative	Brian Kelly	2,893	3.0
Total votes		97,350	100.0
Democratic hold			

=== District 22 ===
Democratic challenger Andrew Gounardes defeated Ross Barkan in the Democratic primary and narrowly defeated Golden in the general election.

==== Democratic primary ====
- Ross Barkan, journalist
- Andrew Gounardes, 2012 Democratic nominee for NY-SD22

Democratic primary results
Party	Candidate	Votes	%
Democratic	Andrew Gounardes	9,007	57.7
Democratic	Ross Barkan	6,616	42.3
Total votes		15,623	100.0

==== General election ====
New York's 22nd State Senate district, 2018
Party	Candidate	Votes	%
Democratic	Andrew Gounardes	31,736	48.3
Working Families	Andrew Gounardes	1,599	2.4
Reform	Andrew Gounardes	172	0.3
Total	Andrew Gounardes	33,507	51.0
Republican	Martin Golden	28,453	43.3
Conservative	Martin Golden	2,885	4.4
Independence	Martin Golden	898	1.3
Total	Martin Golden (incumbent)	32,236	49.0
Total votes		65,743	100.0
Democratic gain from Republican			

=== District 23 ===
==== Democratic primary ====
- Jasmine Robinson, legal secretary
- Diane Savino, incumbent
- Brandon Stradford

Democratic primary results
Party	Candidate	Votes	%
Democratic	Diane Savino (incumbent)	13,270	67.5
Democratic	Jasmine Robinson	4,015	20.4
Democratic	Brandon Stradford	2,363	12.1
Total votes		19,648	100.0

==== Reform primary ====
Reform primary results
Party	Candidate	Votes	%
Reform	Diane Savino (incumbent)	531	91.4
Reform	Other	50	8.6
Total votes		581	100.0

==== General election ====
New York's 23rd State Senate district, 2018
Party	Candidate	Votes	%
Democratic	Diane Savino	43,429	66.5
Independence	Diane Savino	1,019	1.6
Women's Equality	Diane Savino	282	0.4
Reform	Diane Savino	265	0.4
Total	Diane Savino (incumbent)	44,995	68.9
Republican	David Krainert	16,861	25.8
Conservative	David Krainert	1,223	1.9
Total	David Krainert	18,084	27.7
Working Families	Jasmine Robinson	2,196	3.4
Total votes		65,275	100.0
Democratic hold			

=== District 24 ===
New York's 24th State Senate district, 2018
Party	Candidate	Votes	%
Republican	Andrew Lanza	65,185	81.3
Conservative	Andrew Lanza	6,561	8.2
Independence	Andrew Lanza	6,238	7.8
Reform	Andrew Lanza	2,169	2.7
Total	Andrew Lanza (incumbent)	80,153	100.0
Total votes		80,153	100.0
Republican hold			

=== District 25 ===
New York's 25th State Senate district, 2018
Party	Candidate	Votes	%
Democratic	Velmanette Montgomery	99,071	89.9
Working Families	Velmanette Montgomery	11,104	10.1
Total	Velmanette Montgomery (incumbent)	110,175	100.0
Total votes		110,175	100.0
Democratic hold			

=== District 26 ===
==== Reform primary ====
Reform primary results
Party	Candidate	Votes	%
Reform	Anthony Arias	335	84.4
Reform	Other	62	15.6
Total votes		397	100.0

==== General election ====
New York's 26th State Senate district, 2018
Party	Candidate	Votes	%
Democratic	Brian Kavanagh	73,740	80.9
Working Families	Brian Kavanagh	6,373	7.0
Total	Brian Kavanagh (incumbent)	80,113	87.9
Republican	Anthony Arias	9,615	10.5
Reform	Anthony Arias	530	0.6
Total	Anthony Arias	10,145	11.1
Conservative	Stuart Avrick	913	1.0
Total votes		91,171	100.0
Democratic hold			

=== District 27 ===
New York's 27th State Senate district, 2018
Party	Candidate	Votes	%
Democratic	Brad Hoylman	99,229	92.5
Working Families	Brad Hoylman	8,004	7.5
Total	Brad Hoylman (incumbent)	107,233	100.0
Total votes		107,233	100.0
Democratic hold			

=== District 28 ===
==== Independence primary ====
Independence primary results
Party	Candidate	Votes	%
Independence	Opportunity to Ballot	88	100.0
Total votes		88	100.0

==== General election ====
New York's 28th State Senate district, 2018
Party	Candidate	Votes	%
Democratic	Liz Krueger	90,487	79.3
Working Families	Liz Krueger	2,793	2.5
Total	Liz Krueger (incumbent)	93,280	81.8
Republican	Peter Holmberg	19,551	17.1
Independence	Peter Holmberg	703	0.6
Stop de Blasio	Peter Holmberg	415	0.4
Reform	Peter Holmberg	94	0.1
Total	Peter Holmberg	20,763	18.2
Total votes		114,043	100.0
Democratic hold			

=== District 29 ===
New York's 29th State Senate district, 2018
Party	Candidate	Votes	%
Democratic	Jose M. Serrano (incumbent)	68,681	92.9
Republican	Jose A. Colon	5,237	7.1
Total votes		73,918	100.0
Democratic hold			

=== District 30 ===
New York's 30th State Senate district, 2018
Party	Candidate	Votes	%
Democratic	Brian Benjamin	90,746	94.0
Working Families	Brian Benjamin	5,782	6.0
Total	Brian Benjamin (incumbent)	96,528	100.0
Total votes		96,528	100.0
Democratic hold			

=== District 31 ===
==== Democratic primary ====
- Marisol Alcantara, incumbent
- Robert Jackson, former New York City councilman
- Thomas Leon
- Tirso Santiago Pina

Democratic primary results
Party	Candidate	Votes	%
Democratic	Robert Jackson	29,140	56.2
Democratic	Marisol Alcantara (incumbent)	19,885	38.3
Democratic	Tirso Pina	2,076	4.0
Democratic	Thomas Leon	778	1.5
Total votes		51,879	100.0

==== General election ====
New York's 31st State Senate district, 2018
Party	Candidate	Votes	%
Democratic	Robert Jackson	81,821	83.6
Working Families	Robert Jackson	5,145	5.3
Total	Robert Jackson	86,966	88.9
Republican	Melinda Crump	6,067	6.2
Reform	Melinda Crump	168	0.2
Total	Melinda Crump	6,235	6.4
Independence	Marisol Alcantara (incumbent)	4,660	4.7
Total votes		97,861	100.0
Democratic hold			

=== District 32 ===
Democrat Luis Sepúlveda had represented this district since winning a special election in April 2018.

New York's 32nd State Senate district, 2018
Party	Candidate	Votes	%
Democratic	Luis Sepúlveda	58,019	93.1
Working Families	Luis Sepúlveda	1,130	1.8
Total	Luis R. Sepúlveda (incumbent)	59,149	94.9
Republican	Patrick Delices	2,183	3.5
Reform	Pamela Stewart-Martinez	566	0.9
Conservative	Migdalia Denis	415	0.7
Total votes		62,313	100.0
Democratic hold			

=== District 33 ===
New York's 33rd State Senate district, 2018
Party	Candidate	Votes	%
Democratic	Gustavo Rivera	45,627	93.2
Working Families	Gustavo Rivera	906	1.9
Total	Gustavo Rivera (incumbent)	46,533	95.1
Republican	Nicole Torres	2,099	4.3
Conservative	Steve Stern	302	0.6
Total votes		48,934	100.0
Democratic hold			

=== District 34 ===
==== Democratic primary ====
- Alessandra Biaggi, Deputy National Operations Director for Hillary Clinton's 2016 presidential campaign
- Jeffrey D. Klein, incumbent

Democratic primary results
Party	Candidate	Votes	%
Democratic	Alessandra Biaggi	19,318	54.3
Democratic	Jeffrey D. Klein (incumbent)	16,290	45.7
Total votes		35,608	100.0

==== General election ====
New York's 34th State Senate district, 2018
Party	Candidate	Votes	%
Democratic	Alessandra Biaggi	58,112	73.0
Working Families	Alessandra Biaggi	2,470	3.1
Total	Alessandra Biaggi	60,582	76.1
Republican	Richard Ribustello	11,875	14.9
Independence	Jeffrey D. Klein (incumbent)	5,736	7.2
Conservative	Antonio Vitiello	1,430	1.8
Total votes		79,623	100.0
Democratic hold			

=== District 35 ===
==== Democratic primary ====
- Virginia Perez
- Andrea Stewart-Cousins, incumbent

Democratic primary results
Party	Candidate	Votes	%
Democratic	Andrea Stewart-Cousins (incumbent)	25,129	80.9
Democratic	Virginia Perez	5,925	19.1
Total votes		31,054	100.0

==== General election ====
New York's 35th State Senate district, 2018
Party	Candidate	Votes	%
Democratic	Andrea Stewart-Cousins	74,393	92.9
Working Families	Andrea Stewart-Cousins	2,630	3.3
Independence	Andrea Stewart-Cousins	1,594	2.0
Women's Equality	Andrea Stewart-Cousins	885	1.1
Reform	Andrea Stewart-Cousins	572	0.7
Total	Andrea Stewart-Cousins (incumbent)	80,074	100.0
Total votes		80,074	100.0
Democratic hold			

=== District 36 ===
New York's 36th State Senate district, 2018
Party	Candidate	Votes	%
Democratic	Jamaal Bailey	73,189	95.8
Working Families	Jamaal Bailey	1,516	2.0
Total	Jamaal Bailey (incumbent)	74,705	97.8
Conservative	Robert Diamond	1,688	2.2
Total votes		76,393	100.0
Democratic hold			

=== District 37 ===
Democrat Shelley Mayer had represented this district since winning a special election in April 2018.

New York's 37th State Senate district, 2018
Party	Candidate	Votes	%
Democratic	Shelley Mayer	70,011	89.5
Women's Equality	Shelley Mayer	4,967	6.4
Working Families	Shelley Mayer	1,688	2.2
Independence	Shelley Mayer	1,516	1.9
Total	Shelley Mayer (incumbent)	78,182	100.0
Total votes		78,182	100.0
Democratic hold			

=== District 38 ===
Democrat David Carlucci, a former member of the Independent Democratic Conference (IDC), was first elected in 2010. Like other former IDC members, Carlucci received a Democratic primary challenge in 2018. After defeating Julie Goldberg in the primary, Carlucci turned back Republican Scott Vanderhoef in the general election.

==== Democratic primary ====
- David Carlucci, incumbent
- Julie Goldberg, school librarian

Democratic primary results
Party	Candidate	Votes	%
Democratic	David Carlucci (incumbent)	13,066	53.9
Democratic	Julie Goldberg	11,174	46.1
Total votes		24,240	100.0

==== General election ====
New York's 38th State Senate district, 2018
Party	Candidate	Votes	%
Democratic	David Carlucci	60,990	63.3
Women's Equality	David Carlucci	2,019	2.1
Total	David Carlucci (incumbent)	63,009	65.4
Republican	C. Scott Vanderhoef	26,265	27.3
Conservative	C. Scott Vanderhoef	4,242	4.4
Reform	C. Scott Vanderhoef	2,097	2.2
Independence	C. Scott Vanderhoef	723	0.7
Total	C. Scott Vanderhoef	33,327	34.6
Total votes		96,336	100.0
Democratic hold			

=== District 39 ===
Republican Sen. William J. Larkin Jr. did not seek re-election.

==== Reform primary ====
Reform primary results
Party	Candidate	Votes	%
Reform	James Skoufis	931	99.7
Reform	Other	3	0.3
Total votes		934	100.0

==== General election ====
New York's 39th State Senate district, 2018
Party	Candidate	Votes	%
Democratic	James Skoufis	48,267	50.5
Working Families	James Skoufis	1,862	2.0
Reform	James Skoufis	712	0.8
Women's Equality	James Skoufis	707	0.7
Total	James Skoufis	51,548	54.0
Republican	Tom Basile	34,195	35.8
Conservative	Tom Basile	5,080	5.3
Independence	Tom Basile	4,713	4.9
Total	Tom Basile	43,988	46.0
Total votes		95,536	100.0
Democratic gain from Republican			

=== District 40 ===
==== Democratic primary ====
Democratic primary results
Party	Candidate	Votes	%
Democratic	Peter Harckham	11,647	53.5
Democratic	Robert Kesten	10,119	46.5
Total votes		21,766	100.0

==== General election ====
New York's 40th State Senate district, 2018
Party	Candidate	Votes	%
Democratic	Peter Harckham	59,560	49.4
Working Families	Peter Harckham	1,777	1.5
Women's Equality	Peter Harckham	818	0.7
Total	Peter Harckham	62,155	51.6
Republican	Terrence Murphy	49,730	41.3
Conservative	Terrence Murphy	6,550	5.4
Independence	Terrence Murphy	1,681	1.4
Reform	Terrence Murphy	360	0.3
Total	Terrence Murphy (incumbent)	58,321	48.4
Total votes		120,476	100.0
Democratic gain from Republican			

=== District 41 ===
New York's 41st State Senate district, 2018
Party	Candidate	Votes	%
Republican	Sue Serino	49,685	42.1
Conservative	Sue Serino	7,683	6.5
Independence	Sue Serino	1,698	1.4
Reform	Sue Serino	368	0.3
Total	Sue Serino (incumbent)	59,434	50.3
Democratic	Karen Smythe	55,582	47.0
Working Families	Karen Smythe	2,274	1.9
Women's Equality	Karen Smythe	890	0.8
Total	Karen Smythe	58,746	49.7
Total votes		118,180	100.0
Republican hold			

=== District 42 ===
Republican John Bonacic, who had represented this district since 1999, did not seek re-election, and was succeeded by Democrat Jen Metzger.

==== Democratic primary ====
- Pramilla Malick, 2016 Democratic nominee for NYSD-42
- Jen Metzger, Rosendale town councilwoman

Democratic primary results
Party	Candidate	Votes	%
Democratic	Jen Metzger	10,797	61.7
Democratic	Pramilla Malick	6,707	38.3
Total votes		17,504	100.0

==== Reform primary ====
Reform primary results
Party	Candidate	Votes	%
Reform	Ann Rabbitt	597	92.4
Reform	Other	49	7.6
Total votes		646	100.0

==== General election ====
New York's 42nd State Senate district, 2018
Party	Candidate	Votes	%
Democratic	Jen Metzger	48,556	48.1
Working Families	Jen Metzger	2,730	2.7
Women's Equality	Jen Metzger	1,006	1.0
Total	Jen Metzger	52,292	51.8
Republican	Ann Rabbitt	41,648	41.3
Conservative	Ann Rabbitt	5,362	5.3
Independence	Ann Rabbitt	1,225	1.2
Reform	Ann Rabbitt	337	0.4
Total	Ann Rabbitt	48,572	48.2
Total votes		100,864	100.0
Democratic gain from Republican			

=== District 43 ===
Republican Kathy Marchione, who had represented this district since 2013, did not seek re-election, and was succeeded by fellow Republican Daphne Jordan.

New York's 43rd State Senate district, 2018
Party	Candidate	Votes	%
Republican	Daphne Jordan	54,576	43.0
Conservative	Daphne Jordan	9,240	7.3
Independence	Daphne Jordan	2,943	2.3
Reform	Daphne Jordan	618	0.5
Total	Daphne Jordan	67,377	53.1
Democratic	Aaron Gladd	54,784	43.1
Working Families	Aaron Gladd	3,433	2.7
Women's Equality	Aaron Gladd	1,398	1.1
Total	Aaron Gladd	59,615	46.9
Total votes		126,992	100.0
Republican hold			

=== District 44 ===
New York's 44th State Senate district, 2018
Party	Candidate	Votes	%
Democratic	Neil Breslin	61,880	63.6
Working Families	Neil Breslin	4,275	4.4
Independence	Neil Breslin	2,575	2.7
Total	Neil Breslin (incumbent)	68,730	70.7
Republican	Christopher Davis	23,647	24.3
Conservative	Christopher Davis	4,204	4.3
Reform	Christopher Davis	683	0.7
Total	Christopher Davis	28,534	29.3
Total votes		97,264	100.0
Democratic hold			

=== District 45 ===
New York's 45th State Senate district, 2018
Party	Candidate	Votes	%
Republican	Betty Little	56,669	55.9
Conservative	Betty Little	4,945	4.9
Independence	Betty Little	3,184	3.1
Reform	Betty Little	472	0.5
Total	Betty Little (incumbent)	65,270	64.4
Democratic	Emily Martz	33,876	33.4
Working Families	Emily Martz	2,185	2.2
Total	Emily Martz	36,061	35.6
Total votes		101,331	100.0
Republican hold			

=== District 46 ===
New York's 46th State Senate district, 2018
Party	Candidate	Votes	%
Republican	George Amedore	55,703	45.5
Conservative	George Amedore	9,201	7.5
Independence	George Amedore	2,818	2.3
Reform	George Amedore	537	0.5
Total	George Amedore (incumbent)	68,259	55.8
Democratic	Pat Courtney Strong	48,813	39.9
Working Families	Pat Courtney Strong	3,885	3.2
Women's Equality	Pat Courtney Strong	1,418	1.1
Total	Pat Courtney Strong	54,116	44.2
Total votes		122,375	100.0
Republican hold			

=== District 47 ===
New York's 47th State Senate district, 2018
Party	Candidate	Votes	%
Republican	Joseph Griffo	59,879	80.3
Independence	Joseph Griffo	7,063	9.5
Conservative	Joseph Griffo	6,736	9.0
Reform	Joseph Griffo	874	1.2
Total	Joseph Griffo (incumbent)	74,552	100.0
Total votes		74,552	100.0
Republican hold			

=== District 48 ===
New York's 48th State Senate district, 2018
Party	Candidate	Votes	%
Republican	Patty Ritchie	55,917	79.9
Independence	Patty Ritchie	7,144	10.2
Conservative	Patty Ritchie	6,946	9.9
Total	Patty Ritchie (incumbent)	70,007	100.0
Total votes		70,007	100.0
Republican hold			

=== District 49 ===
==== Reform primary ====
Reform primary results
Party	Candidate	Votes	%
Reform	Jim Tedisco (incumbent)	1,099	72.8
Reform	Michelle Ostrelich	401	26.6
Reform	Other	10	0.6
Total votes		1,510	100.0

==== General election ====
New York's 49th State Senate district, 2018
Party	Candidate	Votes	%
Republican	Jim Tedisco	54,556	50.1
Conservative	Jim Tedisco	7,172	6.6
Independence	Jim Tedisco	2,331	2.1
Reform	Jim Tedisco	494	0.5
Total	Jim Tedisco (incumbent)	64,553	59.3
Democratic	Michelle Ostrelich	41,059	37.7
Working Families	Michelle Ostrelich	2,075	1.9
Women's Equality	Michelle Ostrelich	1,151	1.1
Total	Michelle Ostrelich	44,285	40.7
Total votes		108,838	100.0
Republican hold			

=== District 50 ===
Republican John DeFrancisco had represented this district since 1993 and did not seek re-election. As of November 7, 2018, Republican Bob Antonacci led Democrat John Mannion by 2,829 votes and declared victory in the race, although absentee ballots remained to be counted. On November 21, 2018, elections officials confirmed Antonacci's victory.

New York's 50th State Senate district, 2018
Party	Candidate	Votes	%
Republican	Bob Antonacci	50,970	41.7
Conservative	Bob Antonacci	8,132	6.6
Independence	Bob Antonacci	2,881	2.4
Upstate Jobs	Bob Antonacci	347	0.3
Total	Bob Antonacci	62,330	51.0
Democratic	John Mannion	56,438	46.1
Working Families	John Mannion	2,427	2.0
Women's Equality	John Mannion	1,133	0.9
Total	John Mannion	59,998	49.0
Total votes		122,328	100.0
Republican hold			

=== District 51 ===
New York's 51st State Senate district, 2018
Party	Candidate	Votes	%
Republican	James Seward	58,100	55.0
Conservative	James Seward	6,014	5.7
Independence	James Seward	2,500	2.4
Reform	James Seward	487	0.4
Total	James Seward (incumbent)	67,101	63.5
Democratic	Joyce St. George	36,628	34.6
Women's Equality	Joyce St. George	1,982	1.9
Total	Joyce St. George	38,610	36.5
Total votes		105,711	100.0
Republican hold			

=== District 52 ===
New York's 52nd State Senate district, 2018
Party	Candidate	Votes	%
Republican	Fred Akshar	66,559	82.1
Independence	Fred Akshar	7,562	9.3
Conservative	Fred Akshar	5,797	7.1
Reform	Fred Akshar	1,176	1.5
Total	Fred Akshar (incumbent)	81,094	100.0
Total votes		81,094	100.0
Republican hold			

=== District 53 ===
==== Democratic primary ====
- Rachel May, board member of OCRRA and former college professor
- David Valesky, incumbent

Democratic primary results
Party	Candidate	Votes	%
Democratic	Rachel May	8,553	51.8
Democratic	David Valesky (incumbent)	7,943	48.2
Total votes		16,496	100.0

==== General election ====
New York's 53rd State Senate district, 2018
Party	Candidate	Votes	%
Democratic	Rachel May	45,706	48.8
Working Families	Rachel May	2,370	2.5
Total	Rachel May	48,076	51.3
Republican	Janet Berl Burman	29,627	31.6
Conservative	Janet Berl Burman	5,021	5.4
Total	Janet Berl Burman	34,648	37.0
Independence	David Valesky	9,625	10.3
Women's Equality	David Valesky	1,393	1.4
Total	David Valesky (incumbent)	11,018	11.7
Total votes		93,742	100.0
Democratic hold			

=== District 54 ===
New York's 54th State Senate district, 2018
Party	Candidate	Votes	%
Republican	Pam Helming	55,858	51.5
Conservative	Pam Helming	8,249	7.6
Independence	Pam Helming	2,566	2.4
Reform	Pam Helming	550	0.5
Total	Pam Helming (incumbent)	67,223	62.0
Democratic	Kenan Baldridge	38,808	35.8
Working Families	Kenan Baldridge	1,618	1.5
Women's Equality	Kenan Baldridge	843	0.7
Total	Kenan Baldridge	41,269	38.0
Total votes		108,492	100.0
Republican hold			

=== District 55 ===
New York's 55th State Senate district, 2018
Party	Candidate	Votes	%
Republican	Rich Funke	54,429	42.6
Conservative	Rich Funke	8,210	6.4
Independence	Rich Funke	3,097	2.5
Reform	Rich Funke	543	0.4
Total	Rich Funke (incumbent)	66,279	51.9
Democratic	Jennifer Lunsford	61,407	48.1
Total votes		127,686	100.0
Republican hold			

=== District 56 ===
New York's 56th State Senate district, 2018
Party	Candidate	Votes	%
Republican	Joseph Robach	43,152	45.1
Conservative	Joseph Robach	7,200	7.5
Independence	Joseph Robach	2,310	2.4
Reform	Joseph Robach	429	0.5
Total	Joseph Robach (incumbent)	53,091	55.5
Democratic	Jeremy Cooney	40,214	42.1
Working Families	Jeremy Cooney	1,452	1.5
Women's Equality	Jeremy Cooney	831	0.9
Total	Jeremy Cooney	42,497	44.5
Total votes		95,588	100.0
Republican hold			

=== District 57 ===
New York's 57th State Senate district, 2018
Party	Candidate	Votes	%
Republican	Catharine Young	64,261	82.0
Conservative	Catharine Young	8,414	10.8
Independence	Catharine Young	4,961	6.3
Reform	Catharine Young	728	0.9
Total	Catharine Young (incumbent)	78,364	100.0
Total votes		78,364	100.0
Republican hold			

=== District 58 ===
==== Democratic primary ====
- Amanda Kirchgessner, community activist
- Michael Lausell, Schuyler County legislator

Democratic primary results
Party	Candidate	Votes	%
Democratic	Amanda Kirchgessner	8,575	61.5
Democratic	Michael Lausell	5,375	38.5
Total votes		13,950	100.0

==== General election ====
New York's 58th State Senate district, 2018
Party	Candidate	Votes	%
Republican	Tom O'Mara	51,769	52.7
Conservative	Tom O'Mara	4,565	4.6
Independence	Tom O'Mara	1,813	1.8
Reform	Tom O'Mara	340	0.4
Total	Tom O'Mara (incumbent)	58,487	59.5
Democratic	Amanda Kirchgessner	36,546	37.2
Working Families	Amanda Kirchgessner	3,268	3.3
Total	Amanda Kirchgessner	39,814	40.5
Total votes		98,301	100.0
Republican hold			

=== District 59 ===
New York's 59th State Senate district, 2018
Party	Candidate	Votes	%
Republican	Patrick M. Gallivan	67,140	73.2
Conservative	Patrick M. Gallivan	14,280	15.5
Independence	Patrick M. Gallivan	8,969	9.8
Reform	Patrick M. Gallivan	1,349	1.5
Total	Patrick M. Gallivan (incumbent)	91,738	100.0
Total votes		91,738	100.0
Republican hold			

=== District 60 ===
New York's 60th State Senate district, 2018
Party	Candidate	Votes	%
Republican	Chris Jacobs	48,643	44.0
Conservative	Chris Jacobs	9,490	8.6
Independence	Chris Jacobs	3,027	2.7
Reform	Chris Jacobs	527	0.5
Total	Chris Jacobs (incumbent)	61,687	55.8
Democratic	Carima El Behairy	45,106	40.8
Working Families	Carima El Behairy	2,537	2.3
Women's Equality	Carima El Behairy	1,300	1.1
Total	Carima El Behairy	48,943	44.2
Total votes		110,630	100.0
Republican hold			

=== District 61 ===
New York's 61st State Senate district, 2018
Party	Candidate	Votes	%
Republican	Michael Ranzenhofer	49,410	44.0
Conservative	Michael Ranzenhofer	9,199	8.2
Independence	Michael Ranzenhofer	1,746	1.5
Reform	Michael Ranzenhofer	425	0.4
Total	Michael Ranzenhofer (incumbent)	60,780	54.1
Democratic	Joan Seamans	48,279	43.0
Working Families	Joan Seamans	2,010	1.8
Women's Equality	Joan Seamans	1,182	1.1
Total	Joan Seamans	51,471	45.9
Total votes		112,251	100.0
Republican hold			

=== District 62 ===
New York's 62nd State Senate district, 2018
Party	Candidate	Votes	%
Republican	Robert Ortt	54,154	68.0
Conservative	Robert Ortt	9,804	12.3
Independence	Robert Ortt	4,506	5.7
Reform	Robert Ortt	654	0.8
Total	Robert Ortt (incumbent)	69,118	86.8
Green	Peter Diachun	10,539	13.2
Total votes		79,657	100.0
Republican hold			

=== District 63 ===
==== Democratic primary ====
- Timothy M. Kennedy (incumbent)
- Shaqurah Zachery, teacher

Democratic primary results
Party	Candidate	Votes	%
Democratic	Timothy M. Kennedy (incumbent)	23,640	76.7
Democratic	Shaqurah Zachery	7,198	23.3
Total votes		30,838	100.0

==== General election ====
New York's 63rd State Senate district, 2018
Party	Candidate	Votes	%
Democratic	Timothy M. Kennedy	62,370	88.8
Working Families	Timothy M. Kennedy	3,811	5.4
Independence	Timothy M. Kennedy	3,006	4.3
Women's Equality	Timothy M. Kennedy	1,034	1.5
Total	Timothy M. Kennedy (incumbent)	70,221	100.0
Total votes		70,221	100.0
Democratic hold			

== Aftermath ==
One question that remained after the 2018 elections was which caucus Democratic senator Simcha Felder would join. Felder, since his first Senate election in 2012, had been a member of the Republican majority. After the dissolution of the Independent Democratic Conference, Felder remained with the Republicans as the decisive vote for Senate control. Felder maintained throughout his tenure that he would rejoin the Democrats if doing so would benefit his district, but after retaking control of the Senate in the 2018 elections, the Senate Democratic Conference did not allow him to join. Felder was allowed into the Senate Democratic Conference in July 2019; this action gave the Conference a total of 40 members.
