= New York's 22nd State Senate district =

American legislative district

Senator
Sam Sutton; D–Gravesend
- Registration: 49.7% Democratic; 21.1% Republican; 25.1% No party preference
- Demographics: 56% White; 1% Black; 13% Hispanic; 27% Asian
- Population (2017): 329,323
- Registered voters: 172,624

New York's 22nd State Senate district is one of 63 districts in the New York State Senate. It has been represented by Democratic Senator Sam Sutton since 2025.

== Geography ==
=== 2020s ===
District 22 is located in southern Brooklyn, encompassing part or all of the neighborhoods of Borough Park, Midwood, Madison, Homecrest, Gravesend, Gerritsen Beach, Sheepshead Bay, and Marine Park.

The district overlaps with New York's 7th, 8th, 9th, 10th, and 11th congressional districts, and with the 41st, 42nd, 44th, 45th, 47th, 48th, 49th, 51st, and 59th districts of the New York State Assembly.

=== 2010s ===
District 22 is located in southern Brooklyn, then encompassing the neighborhoods of Bay Ridge, Dyker Heights, Bensonhurst, Bath Beach, Gravesend, Gerritsen Beach, Manhattan Beach, and Marine Park.

The district overlapped with New York's 7th, 8th, 9th, 10th, and 11th congressional districts, and with the 41st, 45th, 46th, 47th, 48th, 49th, 51st, 59th, and 64th districts of the New York State Assembly.

== List of office holders ==
Name	Party	In office	Counties	Notes
Marty Golden	Republican	January 20, 2003 – December 31, 2018	Brooklyn	Lost re-election.
Andrew Gounardes	Democratic	January 1, 2019 – December 31, 2022	Brooklyn	Redistricted to the 26th district.
Simcha Felder	Democratic	January 1, 2023 – April 9, 2025	Brooklyn	Redistricted from the 17th district. Resigned after winning a special election to the New York City Council.
Sam Sutton	Democratic	May 27, 2025 – present	Brooklyn	Won in a special election.

== Recent election results ==
=== 2026 ===
2026 New York State Senate election, District 22
Primary election
Party	Candidate	Votes	%
Republican	Nachman Caller	535	44.5
Republican	Bernard Vaiselberg	517	43.0
Write-in		151	12.5
Total votes		1,203	100.0
General election
Democratic	Sam Sutton (incumbent)		
Republican	Nachman Caller		
Conservative	Nachman Caller		
Total	Nachman Caller		
Write-in			
Total votes			100.0

=== 2025 special ===
2025 New York State Senate special election, District 22
Party	Candidate	Votes	%
Democratic	Sam Sutton	8,970	67.0
Republican	Nachman Caller	3,736	
Conservative	Nachman Caller	536	
Total	Nachman Caller	4,272	31.9
Write-in		140	1.1
Total votes		13,382	100.0
Democratic hold			

=== 2024 ===
2024 New York State Senate election, District 22
Party	Candidate	Votes	%
Republican	Simcha Felder	46,468	
Democratic	Simcha Felder	21,959	
Conservative	Simcha Felder	6,572	
Total	Simcha Felder (incumbent)	74,999	99.1
Write-in		689	0.9
Total votes		75,688	100.0
Democratic hold			

=== 2022 ===
2022 New York State Senate election, District 22
Party	Candidate	Votes	%
Republican	Simcha Felder	39,234	
Democratic	Simcha Felder	16,386	
Conservative	Simcha Felder	3,914	
Total	Simcha Felder	59,534	95.1
Working Families	Marva Brown	2,846	4.5
Write-in		242	0.4
Total votes		62,622	100.0
Democratic win (new boundaries)			

=== 2020 ===
2020 New York State Senate election, District 22
Party	Candidate	Votes	%
Democratic	Andrew Gounardes	46,001	
Working Families	Andrew Gounardes	5,301	
SAM	Andrew Gounardes	263	
Total	Andrew Gounardes (incumbent)	51,565	51.8
Republican	Vito Bruno	43,719	
Conservative	Vito Bruno	3,821	
Independence	Vito Bruno	290	
Total	Vito Bruno	47,830	48.1
Write-in		121	0.1
Total votes		99,516	100.0
Democratic hold			

=== 2018 ===
2018 New York State Senate election, District 22
Primary election
Party	Candidate	Votes	%
Democratic	Andrew Gounardes	9,007	57.1
Democratic	Ross Barkan	6,616	41.9
Write-in		150	1.0
Total votes		15,773	100.0
General election
Democratic	Andrew Gounardes	31,736	
Working Families	Andrew Gounardes	1,599	
Reform	Andrew Gounardes	172	
Total	Andrew Gounardes	33,507	50.9
Republican	Marty Golden	28,453	
Conservative	Marty Golden	2,885	
Independence	Marty Golden	898	
Total	Marty Golden (incumbent)	32,236	49.0
Write-in		61	0.1
Total votes		65,804	100.0
Democratic gain from Republican			

=== 2016 ===
2016 New York State Senate election, District 22
Party	Candidate	Votes	%
Republican	Marty Golden	47,491	
Independence	Marty Golden	6,654	
Conservative	Marty Golden	5,694	
Reform	Marty Golden	2,194	
Total	Marty Golden (incumbent)	62,033	98.3
Write-in		1,054	1.7
Total votes		63,087	100.0
Republican hold			

=== 2014 ===
2014 New York State Senate election, District 22
Party	Candidate	Votes	%
Republican	Marty Golden	18,243	
Conservative	Marty Golden	4,015	
Independence	Marty Golden	1,322	
Total	Marty Golden (incumbent)	23,580	68.8
Democratic	Jamie Kemmerer	9,183	
Working Families	Jamie Kemmerer	1,440	
Total	Jamie Kemmerer	10,633	31.1
Write-in		48	0.1
Total votes		34,261	100.0
Republican hold			

=== 2012 ===
2012 New York State Senate election, District 22
Party	Candidate	Votes	%
Republican	Marty Golden	32,774	
Conservative	Marty Golden	4,178	
Independence	Marty Golden	1,632	
Total	Marty Golden (incumbent)	38,584	57.7
Democratic	Andrew Gounardes	26,525	
Working Families	Andrew Gounardes	1,718	
Total	Andrew Gounardes	28,243	42.2
Write-in		51	0.1
Total votes		66,878	100.0
Republican hold			

=== Federal results in District 22 ===
Year	Office	Results
2020	President	Trump 50.4 – 48.1%
2016	President	Trump 48.8 – 48.1%
2012	President	Obama 51.9 – 46.8%
2012	Senate	Gillibrand 65.3 – 33.0%
