= New York's 107th State Assembly district =

American legislative district

Assemblymember
Scott Bendett; R–Averill Park

New York's 107th State Assembly district is one of the 150 districts in the New York State Assembly. It has been represented by Republican Scott Bendett since 2023, succeeding Jake Ashby.

== Geography ==
District 107 consists of a majority of Rennselaer County, portions of Washington and Columbia counties, and the town of Bethlehem in Albany County. It includes the towns of Averill Park, Cambridge, Chatham, Ghent, Hoosick, Kinderhook, Nassau, Poestenkill, Schaghticoke, and Valatie.

The district overlaps (partially) with New York's 19th, 20th, and 21st congressional districts, as well as the 41st, 43rd and 46th districts of the New York State Senate.

=== 2010s ===
District 107 consists of a majority of Rennselaer County (except for the city of Rensselaer) and portions of Washington and Columbia counties.

== Recent election results ==
=== 2026 ===
2026 New York State Assembly election, District 107
Party	Candidate	Votes	%
Republican	Scott Bendett		
Conservative	Scott Bendett		
Total	Scott Bendett (incumbent)		
Democratic	Chloe Pierce		
Working Families	Chloe Pierce		
Total	Chloe Pierce		
Write-in			
Total votes			

=== 2024 ===
2024 New York State Assembly election, District 107
Primary election
Party	Candidate	Votes	%
Democratic	Chloe Pierce	3,615	54.3
Democratic	Kent Sopris Jr.	3,012	45.3
Write-in		28	0.4
Total votes		6,655	100.0
General election
Republican	Scott Bendett	33,746	
Conservative	Scott Bendett	6,024	
Total	Scott Bendett (incumbent)	39,770	52.8
Democratic	Chloe Pierce	35,433	47.1
Write-in		67	0.1
Total votes		75,270	100.0
Republican hold			

=== 2022 ===
2022 New York State Assembly election, District 107
Party	Candidate	Votes	%
Republican	Scott Bendett	31,202	
Conservative	Scott Bendett	7,707	
Total	Scott Bendett	38,909	97.5
Write-in		979	2.5
Total votes		39,888	100.0
Republican hold			

=== 2020 ===
2020 New York State Assembly election, District 107
Party	Candidate	Votes	%
Republican	Jake Ashby	32,642	
Conservative	Jake Ashby	4,216	
Independence	Jake Ashby	1,659	
Total	Jake Ashby (incumbent)	38,517	54.1
Democratic	Brittany Vogel	28,335	
Working Families	Brittany Vogel	3,648	
Total	Brittany Vogel	31,983	45.0
Libertarian	Charles Senrick	672	0.9
Write-in		21	0.0
Total votes		71,193	100.0
Republican hold			

=== 2018 ===
2018 New York State Assembly election, District 107
Primary election
Party	Candidate	Votes	%
Democratic	Tistrya Houghtling	4,764	59.3
Democratic	Donald Boyajian	3,271	40.7
Write-in		0	0.0
Total votes		8,035	100
Green	Tistrya Houghtling	30	85.7
Green	Donald Boyajian	5	14.3
Write-in		0	0.0
Total votes		35	100
General election
Republican	Jake Ashby	22,973	
Conservative	Jake Ashby	4,621	
Independence	Jake Ashby	1,353	
Reform	Jake Ashby	223	
Total	Jake Ashby (incumbent)	29,170	50.8
Democratic	Tistrya Houghtling	25,058	
Working Families	Tistrya Houghtling	1,730	
Women's Equality	Tistrya Houghtling	790	
Green	Tistrya Houghtling	704	
Total	Tistrya Houghtling	28,282	49.2
Write-in		8	0.0
Total votes		57,460	100.0
Republican hold			

=== 2018 special ===
Incumbent Steven McLaughlin resigned his seat on December 31, 2017 to serve as county executive of Rensselaer County, triggering a special election. In special elections for state legislative offices, primaries are usually not held - county committee members for each party select nominees.

2018 New York State Assembly special election, District 107
Party	Candidate	Votes	%
Republican	Jake Ashby	5,833	
Conservative	Jake Ashby	1,577	
Independence	Jake Ashby	727	
Reform	Jake Ashby	98	
Total	Jake Ashby	8,235	50.5
Democratic	Cynthia Doran	6,919	
Working Families	Cynthia Doran	707	
Women's Equality	Cynthia Doran	435	
Total	Cynthia Doran	8,061	49.5
Write-in		8	0.0
Total votes		16,304	100.0
Republican hold			

=== 2016 ===
2016 New York State Assembly election, District 107
Party	Candidate	Votes	%
Republican	Steven McLaughlin	38,219	
Independence	Steven McLaughlin	8,630	
Conservative	Steven McLaughlin	6,853	
Reform	Steven McLaughlin	802	
Total	Steven McLaughlin (incumbent)	54,504	99.3
Write-in		383	0.7
Total votes		54,887	100.0
Republican hold			

=== 2014 ===
2014 New York State Assembly election, District 107
Primary election
Party	Candidate	Votes	%
Independence	Steven McLaughlin (incumbent)	475	61.4
Independence	Philip Malone	299	38.6
Write-in		0	0.0
Total votes		774	100
Working Families	Philip Malone	80	62.5
Working Families	Steven McLaughlin (incumbent)	48	37.5
Write-in		0	0.0
Total votes		128	100
General election
Republican	Steven McLaughlin	20,591	
Conservative	Steven McLaughlin	5,049	
Independence	Steven McLaughlin	2,495	
Stop Common Core	Steven McLaughlin	344	
Total	Steven McLaughlin (incumbent)	28,479	66.3
Democratic	Philip Malone	12,142	
Working Families	Philip Malone	2,284	
Total	Philip Malone	14,426	33.6
Write-in		8	0.0
Total votes		42,912	100.0
Republican hold			

=== 2012 ===
2012 New York State Assembly election, District 107
Primary election
Party	Candidate	Votes	%
Democratic	Cheryl Roberts	2,519	79.3
Democratic	Keith Hammond	659	20.7
Write-in		0	0.0
Total votes		3,178	100
Working Families	Cheryl Roberts	52	81.3
Working Families	Brenda Mahar	12	18.7
Write-in		0	0.0
Total votes		64	100
General election
Republican	Steven McLaughlin	23,934	
Conservative	Steven McLaughlin	3,968	
Independence	Steven McLaughlin	2,348	
Total	Steven McLaughlin (incumbent)	30,250	51.8
Democratic	Cheryl Roberts	25,338	
Working Families	Cheryl Roberts	2,802	
Total	Cheryl Roberts	28,140	48.2
Write-in		6	0.0
Total votes		58,396	100.0
Republican hold			
