= Chloe Pierce =

American politician

Member-elect of the New York State Assembly from the 107th district
- Assuming office January 2027
- Succeeding: Scott Bendett

Personal details
- Party: Democratic

Chloe Pierce (born November 17, 1995) is an American politician and lobbyist. She is the Democratic member-elect of the New York State Assembly from the 107th district, defeating incumbent Scott Bendett.

== Biography ==
Pierce was born November 17, 1995, in Niskayuna, New York. She studied at the University at Albany, where she obtained her bachelor's and master's degrees, both in history.

Pierce worked as a lobbyist for an Albany firm, with one of her clients being the New York State Nurses Association. She works for lobbying firm Malkin & Ross, with her work including the Medical Aid in Dying Act and the New York Health Act. She has also worked for AARP.

Pierce ran in the 2024 New York State Assembly election from the 107th district, which is located alongside the state's borders with Vermont and Massachusetts. She was running against Republican incumbent Scott Bendett, whom Jason Beeferman of Politico called as "a top target for Democrats". She won the June Democratic primary, defeating Kent Sopris 54.3% to 45.3%. She lost the November general election to Bendett, 52.8% to 47.1%.

In 2026, Pierce ran in a rematch with Bendett. She cited affordability, food security, and housing as issues for her campaign. She received the endorsement of state comptroller Tom DiNapoli.

Pierce won the Democratic nomination in June with a lack of opposition. She won the general election in November, unseating Bendett and flipping the district. She also became the youngest Assemblymember to ever represent an upstate district.

Pierce lives in Slingerlands, a hamlet inside the Albany suburb of Bethlehem.
