= Devin Lander =

American politician

Member-elect of the New York State Senate from the 43rd district
- Assuming office January 2027
- Succeeding: Jake Ashby

Personal details
- Party: Democratic

Devin Lander is an American politician. A member of the Democratic Party, he is the member-elect for the 43rd district of the New York State Senate.

== Early life and education ==
Lander was raised in Wayland, New York. After graduating high school in 1996, he attended the State University of New York at Plattsburgh in Plattsburgh, New York, majoring in American history.

== Career ==
In 2007, Lander was hired as deputy legislative director and committee clerk for Steve Englebright, a New York assemblyman. He remained on Englebright's staff when Englebright became chair of the governmental operations committee in the New York State Assembly.

In 2014, Lander was hired as the executive director of the Museum Association of New York. In 2016, he was named the 16th New York State Historian at the New York State Museum in Albany, New York. During time as the state historian, he served managing editor of the New York History, and was co-host of the podcast A New York Minute in History.

In 2025, Lander became an adjunct professor in the department of history at University at Albany. He announced his run for the 43rd district of the New York State Senate in December 2025. He campaigned on a platform of delivering resources to the district, working on the affordability crisis and combating utility costs, and he defeated Republican incumbent Jake Ashby in the 2026 general election.
