= Jake Ashby =

American politician

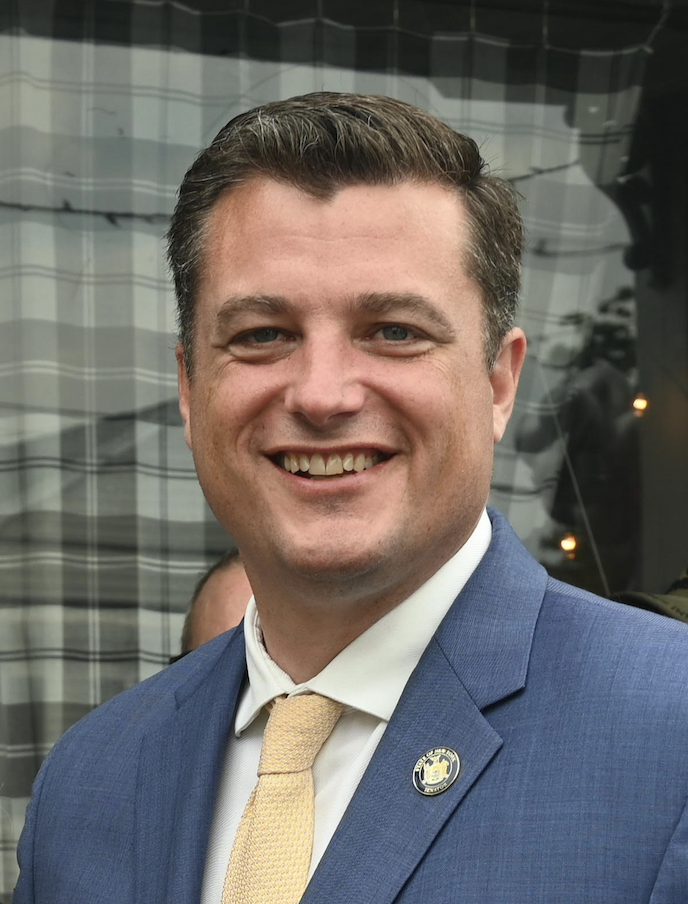
- Ashby in 2025

Member of the New York State Senate from the 43rd district
- Incumbent
- Assumed office January 1, 2023
- Preceded by: Daphne Jordan
- Succeeded by: Devin Lander (elect)

Member of the New York State Assembly from the 107th district
- In office April 30, 2018 – December 31, 2022
- Preceded by: Steven McLaughlin
- Succeeded by: Scott Bendett

Personal details
- Party: Republican
- Spouse: Kristy
- Children: 2
- Education: Keuka College; Union Graduate College
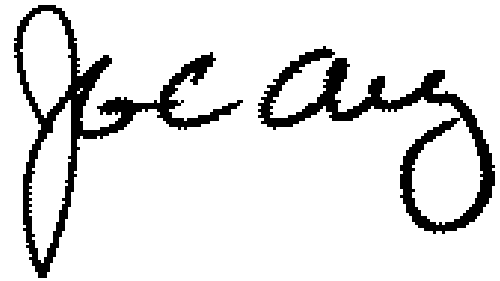
- Signature
- Website: Campaign website; Official website

Jacob C. Ashby is an American politician from the state of New York. A Republican, Ashby has represented the 43rd district in the New York State Senate since 2023. He previously served in the Rensselaer County Legislature and the New York State Assembly.

== Education and early career ==
Ashby is a graduate of Hudson Valley Community College, Keuka College, and Union Graduate College.

Ashby is an occupational therapist. He has taught at Maria College. He is a former captain in the United States Army Reserve, having completed tours in Afghanistan and Iraq.

== Political career ==
A Republican, Ashby is a former member of the Rensselaer County Legislature.

=== Elections ===
In 2018, Ashby ran for State Assembly in the 107th district. The district had been represented by Steven McLaughlin until his election as Rensselaer County Executive. In a close special election in April 2018, Ashby defeated Democrat Cynthia Doran by 174 votes. Ashby won another close election that November, defeating Democrat Tistrya Houghtling by less than 1,000 votes. In his 2020 re-election campaign, Ashby defeated Democrat Brittany Vogel.

In 2022, Ashby ran for State Senate in the newly reconfigured 43rd district. He defeated Democrat Andrea Smyth by a narrow margin. In 2024, he defeated Democratic challenger Alvin Gamble to win re-election.

=== Political positions ===
As an assemblymember, Ashby "pushed for policy changes to help veterans, including bills to create peer mental health support programs for first responders and frontline health workers struggling with depression, anxiety or PTSD".

In 2024, as a member of the State Senate, Ashby introduced legislation to combat poverty by providing $1,000 "baby bonuses" to parents of newborns.

Ashby helped to pass legislation creating a new program to help undocumented New York military veterans acquire U.S. citizenship.

In June 2025, as a member of the State Senate, Ashby voted against the Medical Aid in Dying Act and debated the bill on the Senate floor. Also in 2025, Ashby supported legislation to provide greater access to mental health courts.

Ashby introduced a bill mandating that internet pornography websites verify that their users are adults before allowing them access to adult content. As of August 2025, 30 legislators had signed on as cosponsors of the bill.

Ashby has also introduced legislation to ban U.S. Immigration and Customs Enforcement agents from sensitive locations and to ban local law enforcement from coordinating with ICE on immigration enforcement raids conducted without warrants. The bill would not ban law enforcement from coordinating with ICE in executing judicial warrants in criminal investigations. In February 2026, Ashby said, "'I think what we’ve seen recently is a failure in leadership at the federal level. I would hope that a bill like this would prompt change'".

== Personal life ==
Ashby lives in Castleton-on-Hudson with his wife, Kristy, and their two children, a son and a daughter.
