= Roy J. McDonald =

American politician

Roy McDonald

Member of the New York State Senate from the 43rd district
- In office January 7, 2009 – December 31, 2012
- Preceded by: Joseph Bruno
- Succeeded by: Kathy Marchione

Member of the New York State Assembly from the 112th district
- In office January 8, 2003 – December 31, 2008
- Preceded by: Dierdre Scozzafava
- Succeeded by: Tony Jordan

Member of the New York State Assembly from the 100th district
- In office February 12, 2002 – December 31, 2002
- Preceded by: Robert D'Andrea
- Succeeded by: Thomas Kirwan

Personal details
- Born: April 12, 1947 (age 79) Lansingburgh, Troy, New York, U.S.
- Party: Republican
- Spouse: Angela
- Education: State University of New York at Oneonta
- Website: Official website

Roy J. McDonald (born April 12, 1947) is a Republican politician and former member of the New York State Legislature who represented the 43rd District in the New York State Senate and Districts 100 and 112 in the New York State Assembly. McDonald served as Town and County Supervisor for the Town of Wilton, New York for 23 years. Following his tenure as Supervisor, McDonald served in the Assembly from 2002 to 2008 and served in the Senate from 2009 to 2012.

McDonald is notable as one of four Republican members of the New York State Senate that voted in favor of the Marriage Equality Act in 2011. In 2012, he was defeated in a Republican primary by his eventual successor, Kathy Marchione.

== Political career ==
For 23 years, McDonald was Town and County Supervisor for the Town of Wilton, New York and in 1986, served a term as Chairman of the Saratoga County Board of Supervisors. McDonald has been a leader regarding autism awareness, creating the Saratoga County Autism Council; his two grandsons are autistic. Before being elected to the New York State Senate in District 43 on November 4, 2008, McDonald had served in the New York State Assembly since 2002, representing the 100th and 112th Districts, respectively. During McDonald's tenure, Senate District 43 included all of Rensselaer County and part of Saratoga County.

=== 2011 same-sex marriage vote ===
McDonald voted against same-sex marriage legislation in 2009.

When same-sex marriage legislation was passed by the State Senate on June 24, 2011, McDonald voted "yes." McDonald was one of four Republican state senators to vote in favor of the bill in 2011.

On June 16, 2011, eight days prior to the Senate vote on same-sex marriage, McDonald spoke to the press about his intended support for the bill. In response to the pressure he was receiving from other Republicans to vote against the bill, he said:

You get to the point where you evolve in your life where everything isn't black and white, good and bad, and you try to do the right thing. You might not like that. You might be very cynical about that. Well, fuck it, I don't care what you think. I'm trying to do the right thing. I'm tired of Republican-Democrat politics. They can take the job and shove it. I come from a blue-collar background. I'm trying to do the right thing, and that's where I'm going with this.

Following his vote in favor of same-sex marriage, McDonald and the three other Republican senators who voted for the bill saw a massive increase in fundraising; this increase included money generated from an event hosted by New York City Mayor Michael Bloomberg.

=== 2012 re-election campaign ===
On March 18, 2012, the Saratoga County Republican Party County Committee declined to nominate Senator McDonald for re-election. McDonald did receive the support of the Independence Party of New York.

On April 4, 2012, Saratoga County Clerk Kathleen Marchione announced that she would challenge McDonald in a Republican primary in Senate District 43. Marchione criticized McDonald for his same-sex marriage vote and accused him of lacking a consistent conservative voting record. One writer commented that the McDonald-Marchione primary contest "could prove to be one of the state's most hotly contested races because of McDonald's recent voting pattern, notably his votes to enact same-sex marriage and Gov. Andrew Cuomo's tax plan."

The Marchione-McDonald primary was called "one of three localized referend[a] on New York's 2011 same-sex marriage law". It was also described as "divisive", "bitter," and "nasty". Initially, the results of the primary were too close to call. Marchione declared victory on September 25, 2012, while McDonald's campaign announced that the senator was considering his options. Marchione defeated McDonald by 99 votes. Later that week, Gov. Andrew Cuomo, a Democrat, weighed in on the race by announcing his support for McDonald to continue his re-election bid on a third-party line.

Following his primary defeat, McDonald opted to cease his campaign and throw his support to Marchione, stating that he was "very proud of [his] time in public service" and that "[s]tanding up for the communities [he] represented was always [his] first priority". Marchione went on to win the general election on November 6, 2012, defeating Democrat Robin Andrews and McDonald (who received 20,929 votes on the Independence Party line despite having suspended his campaign).

Following McDonald's loss in his 2012 primary, Newsday described him as "a political casualty of same-sex marriage."

New York State Assembly
Preceded by Robert A. D'Andrea	New York State Assembly, 100th District; 2002	Succeeded by Thomas Kirwan
Preceded by Dierdre Scozzafava	New York State Assembly, 112th District; 2003–2008	Succeeded by Tony Jordan
New York State Senate
Preceded by Joseph Bruno	New York State Senate, 43rd District; 2009–2013	Succeeded by Kathleen Marchione
Preceded by Thomas Morahan	Chairman of the Senate Committee on Mental Health and Developmental Disabilities; 2011-2013	Succeeded by David Carlucci
