= Andrew Gounardes =

American politician

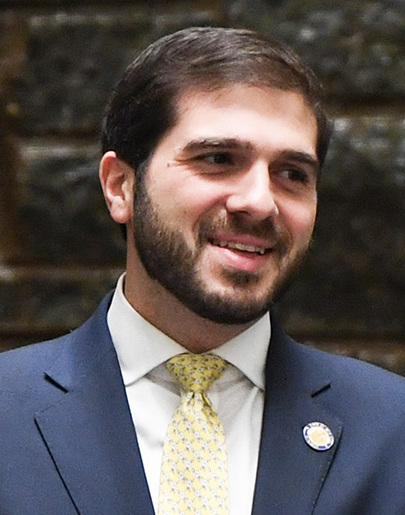

Member of the New York Senate from the 26th district
- Incumbent
- Assumed office January 1, 2019
- Preceded by: Marty Golden
- Constituency: 22nd district (2019–2023); 26th district (2023–present)

Personal details
- Born: July 8, 1985 (age 41) New York City, New York, U.S.
- Party: Democratic
- Education: Hunter College (BA); George Washington University (JD)
- Website: State Senate website Campaign website

Andrew Gounardes (born July 8, 1985) is an American lawyer and politician. He is a Democrat and a member of the New York State Senate, representing the 26th district, which encompasses the neighborhoods of Bay Ridge, Dyker Heights, Sunset Park, Greenwood Heights, Red Hook, Park Slope, Gowanus, Carroll Gardens, Boerum Hill, Cobble Hill, Downtown Brooklyn, Fort Greene, Brooklyn Heights, Vinegar Hill, and DUMBO in Brooklyn.

== Early life and education ==
Gounardes was born in Brooklyn to Steven, a dentist, and Dianne Gounardes, and raised in the Bay Ridge neighborhood. A fourth-generation Greek-American, he graduated from Fort Hamilton High School, before going on to earn degrees from Hunter College and the George Washington University Law School.

== Early career ==
Following law school, Gounardes worked for Councilman Vincent J. Gentile as a constituent aide, and later as Counsel to Brooklyn Borough President Eric Adams.

Gounardes formerly served as a trustee of the New York City Employees’ Retirement System, and as a member of Brooklyn Community Board 10. Following Hurricane Sandy in 2012, Gounardes, along with Justin Brannan, founded the nonprofit Bay Ridge Cares, which assisted local residents with disaster relief.

== New York Senate ==
Gounardes first ran against Republican Senator Marty Golden in 2012, but lost. In a traditionally politically conservative area, Golden proved to be a popular incumbent due to his name recognition and strong constituent services. Golden even ran unopposed in 2016.

However, in 2018, Golden faced scrutiny after it was publicized that he had failed to pay a number of parking tickets, and was illegally posing as a police officer to run red lights. He also utilized illegal parking placards. As a result, and along with the national political climate, Golden was seen as vulnerable by New York political operatives. Gounardes declared his candidacy in early 2018. After defeating journalist Ross Barkan in the Democratic primary, he went on to defeat Golden in the general election, 51% to 49%.

In the Senate, Gounardes serves as Chairman of the Committee on Civil Service and Pensions.

In 2023, Gournardes was one of 26 New York State Senators to endorse Democrat John Mannion, who was running for the New York's 22nd congressional district.
