= Scott Bendett =

New York politician

Member of the New York State Assembly from the 107th district
- Incumbent
- Assumed office January 2, 2023
- Preceded by: Jake Ashby

Rensselaer County Legislature
- In office 2017–2023

Personal details
- Party: Republican; Conservative
- Children: Samuel Bendett, Alexandra Bendett
- Education: University at Albany, SUNY
- Occupation: Businessman
- Website: nyassembly.gov/mem/Scott-Bendett

Scott Bendett is an American politician from New York who has represented the New York State Assembly's 107th district consisting of most of Rensselaer County and portions of Washington and Columbia counties as a Republican since 2023.

== Biography ==
Bendett attended Niskayuna High School and the University at Albany and lives in Averill Park, New York.

Prior to his election to the State Assembly, Bendett was the founder and owner of the Habana Premium Cigar Shoppe in Sand Lake, founding the business in 1998 as a small kiosk and seeing success as an online marketplace. He is also the CEO of the Bendett Investment Group, a real estate development firm.

=== Political career ===
Bendett began his political career being elected to the Rensselaer County Legislature in 2017.

Bendett then ran unopposed to the 107th district which saw its prior assemblyman, Jake Ashby (R) get redistricted to the 43rd District. Due to the Democrats not running a candidate, Bendett won with 97.5% of the vote after also securing the Conservative nomination. Bendett would be sworn in on January 2, 2023, at the Rensselaer County Courthouse.

Bendett has supported increasing the tax credit that emergency medical services volunteers receive in an effort to increase their numbers and retention. Bendett has also co-sponsored the Psychedelic Assisted Therapy Bill which would see the legalization of possession of psilocybin, ibogaine, and DMT in the state of New York. Bendett has supported the expansion of vocational education, including vocational classes in public high-schools. Bendett joined the calls for resignation of Jason Schofield, the former Rensselaer County Republican elections board commissioner who plead guilty to federal charges of fraudulently obtaining and filing absentee ballots.

In 2025, Bendett secured a grant for the town of Bethlehem to install flashing crosswalk beacons in a busy area on Kenwood Avenue near the Bethlehem Middle School and St Thomas the Apostle school. <https://www.news10.com/news/albany-county/flashing-crosswalk-beacons-to-be-installed-in-bethlehem/>

== Personal life ==
Bendett has two children: Samuel and Alexandra.

New York State Assembly
Preceded by Jake Ashby	New York State Assembly, 107th District; 2023–	Succeeded by Incumbent
