= New York's 26th State Senate district =

American legislative district

- The 26th district since 2023.
Senator
Andrew Gounardes; D–Brooklyn
- Demographics: 49.8% White; 9.4% Black; 24.0% Hispanic; 17.6% Asian; 2.1% Native American; 0.2% Hawaiian/Pacific Islander
- Population (2020) • Voting age • Citizens of voting age: 322,005; 260,860; 204,057

New York's 26th State Senate district is one of 63 districts in the New York State Senate. Based in western Brooklyn, neighborhoods located entirely or partially within the district's boundaries include Carroll Gardens, Cobble Hill, the Columbia Street Waterfront District, Dumbo, Dyker Heights, Fort Hamilton, Gowanus, Park Slope, Red Hook, South Slope, and Sunset Park. Also within its boundaries are the Brooklyn Bridge, the Statue of Liberty, and Ellis Island.

It is currently represented by Democrat Andrew Gounardes. Prior to redistricting in 2022, much of the seat's territory fell within the 19th district.

President Franklin D. Roosevelt began his political career representing the 26th district from 1911 to 1913, albeit under entirely different lines. The district was previously based in upstate New York and contained portions of Columbia, Dutchess and Putnam counties.

== Recent election results ==
=== 2026 ===
2026 New York State Senate election, District 26
Party	Candidate	Votes	%
Democratic	Andrew Gounardes		
Working Families	Andrew Gounardes		
Total	Andrew Gounardes (incumbent)		
Republican	Tom Stanten		
Conservative	Tom Stanten		
Total	Tom Stanten		
Write-in			
Total votes			100.0

=== 2024 ===
2024 New York State Senate election, District 26
Party	Candidate	Votes	%
Democratic	Andrew Gounardes	78,176	
Working Families	Andrew Gounardes	13,231	
Total	Andrew Gounardes (incumbent)	91,407	78.5
Republican	Vito LaBella	21,445	
Conservative	Vito LaBella	3,194	
Total	Vito LaBella	24,639	21.2
Write-in		357	0.3
Total votes		116,403	100.0
Democratic hold			

=== 2022 ===
2022 New York State Senate election, District 26
Primary election
Party	Candidate	Votes	%
Democratic	Andrew Gounardes (incumbent)	18,353	65.3
Democratic	David Yassky	9,614	34.2
Write-in		123	0.5
Total votes		28,090	100.0
General election
Democratic	Andrew Gounardes	56,550	
Working Families	Andrew Gounardes	13,426	
Total	Andrew Gounardes (incumbent)	69,976	79.1
Republican	Brian Fox	16,145	
Conservative	Brian Fox	1,622	
Total	Brian Fox	17,767	20.0
Medical Freedom	Martha Rowen	665	0.8
Write-in		77	0.1
Total votes		88,485	100.0
Democratic win (new boundaries)			

=== 2020 ===
2020 New York State Senate election, District 26
Party	Candidate	Votes	%
Democratic	Brian Kavanagh (incumbent)	95,552	78.9
Republican	Lester Chang	22,549	
Conservative	Lester Chang	2,752	
Total	Lester Chang	25,301	20.9
Write-in		222	0.2
Total votes		121,075	100.0
Democratic hold			

=== 2018 ===
2018 New York State Senate election, District 26
Primary election
Party	Candidate	Votes	%
Reform	Anthony Arias	335	82.1
Write-in		73	17.9
Total votes		408	100.0
General election
Democratic	Brian Kavanagh	73,740	
Working Families	Brian Kavanagh	6,373	
Total	Brian Kavanagh (incumbent)	80,113	87.7
Republican	Anthony Arias	9,615	
Reform	Anthony Arias	530	
Total	Anthony Arias	10,145	11.1
Conservative	Stuart Avrick	913	1.0
Write-in		134	0.2
Total votes		91,305	100.0
Democratic hold			

=== 2017 special ===
2017 New York State Senate special election, District 26
Party	Candidate	Votes	%
Democratic	Brian Kavanagh	30,188	
Working Families	Brian Kavanagh	4,486	
Total	Brian Kavanagh	34,674	85.0
Republican	Analicia Alexander	5,915	14.5
Write-in		185	0.5
Total votes		40,774	100.0
Democratic hold			

=== 2016 ===
2016 New York State Senate election, District 26
Party	Candidate	Votes	%
Democratic	Daniel Squadron	87,460	
Working Families	Daniel Squadron	8,002	
Total	Daniel Squadron (incumbent)	95,462	99.4
Write-in		607	0.6
Total votes		96,069	100.0
Democratic hold			

=== 2014 ===
2014 New York State Senate election, District 26
Party	Candidate	Votes	%
Democratic	Daniel Squadron	26,169	
Working Families	Daniel Squadron	6,290	
Total	Daniel Squadron (incumbent)	32,459	86.3
Republican	Wave Chan	5,067	13.5
Write-in		71	0.2
Total votes		37,597	100.0
Democratic hold			

=== 2012 ===
2012 New York State Senate election, District 26
Party	Candidate	Votes	%
Democratic	Daniel Squadron	65,282	
Working Families	Daniel Squadron	5,056	
Total	Daniel Squadron (incumbent)	70,338	86.6
Republican	Jacqueline Haro	10,790	13.3
Write-in		78	0.1
Total votes		81,206	100.0
Democratic hold			

=== Federal results in District 26 ===
Year	Office	Results
2020	President	Biden 81.2 – 17.3%
2016	President	Clinton 85.1 – 11.8%
2012	President	Obama 81.8 – 16.5%
2012	Senate	Gillibrand 85.9 – 12.1%
