= Steven McLaughlin =

American politician (born 1963)

Steve McLaughlin
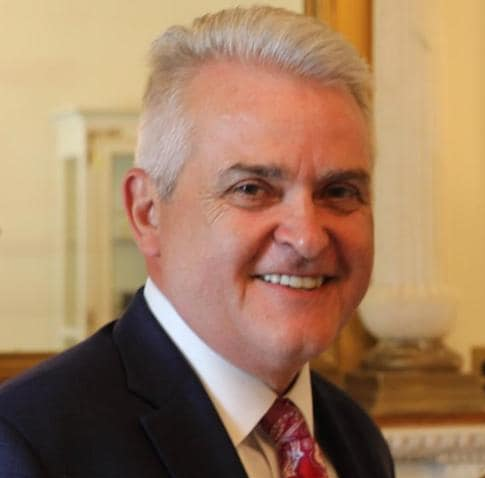
- McLaughlin in 2024

County Executive of Rensselaer County
- Incumbent
- Assumed office January 1, 2018
- Preceded by: Kathleen Jimino

Member of the New York State Assembly from the 107th district
- In office January 1, 2011 – December 31, 2017
- Preceded by: Timothy Gordon
- Succeeded by: Jacob Ashby

Personal details
- Born: Steven Francis McLaughlin; October 4, 1963 (age 63) Boston, Massachusetts, U.S.
- Party: Republican
- Children: 2
- Education: Florida Institute of Technology; Arizona State University, Tempe; Empire State University (BA); University of Phoenix (MBA)

Steven Francis "Steve" McLaughlin (born October 4, 1963) is an American politician serving as County Executive of Rensselaer County, New York. A Republican, McLaughlin represented the 107th District in the New York State Assembly from 2011 to 2017; the district included parts of Albany, Columbia, Greene and Rensselaer Counties in New York's Capital Region. McLaughlin was elected Rensselaer County Executive in November 2017.

== Early life and education ==
McLaughlin was born in Boston, Massachusetts, the third of four children of Arthur and Winifred McLaughlin. He was raised in Wrentham, Massachusetts, attending public elementary school and Xaverian Brothers High School.

He attended the Florida Institute of Technology in 1983 and received commercial and instrument aircraft ratings. He then studied finance at Arizona State University. He earned a B.A. degree from Empire State College (State University of New York) and an M.B.A. from the University of Phoenix.

== Career ==
Before entering politics, McLaughlin was an airline pilot and a banker and solar product salesperson.

=== New York State Assembly (2011-2017) ===
McLaughlin was elected to the New York State Assembly on November 2, 2010, when he defeated incumbent Timothy P. Gordon. McLaughlin had previously run against Gordon in 2008 but was defeated. McLaughlin was re-elected to the Assembly in 2012, 2014, and 2016.

McLaughlin was censured by the New York State Assembly Ethics Committee in 2017 for violations of the Sexual Harassment Policy after he requested a female staff member send him nude photos.

McLaughlin was accused of "roughing up" a former top aide. He was recorded telling the same aide, “You’re still fat. You are. Not attractive — and you’re a (expletive) awful human being.”

In 2013, McLaughlin criticized Cuomo's gun control policies and compared him to Adolf Hitler, Mussolini, and Putin. McLaughlin later apologized for making the comparison.

=== Rensselaer County Executive (2018-present) ===
McLaughlin ran for Rensselaer County Executive in 2017 following the retirement of longtime County Executive Kathy Jimino. After defeating Deputy County Executive Christopher Meyer in a contentious Republican primary, McLaughlin narrowly prevailed over Democrat Andrea Smyth in the general election.

Mclaughlin was sworn in as Rensselaer County executive on January 1, 2018.

In November 2019, leaked audio from a verbally abusive private meeting between McLaughlin, several of his top political and governmental aides, former Republican Congressman John Sweeney, and then-Republican candidate for Troy mayor Thomas Reale, was published by the Times Union. During the meeting, McLaughlin, County Director of Operations Richard Crist, County Director of Purchasing James Gordon, and Sweeney pressured Reale to drop out of the mayoral race and endorse Rodney Wiltshire, a third-party candidate defeated in the Democratic primary by incumbent Democratic Mayor Patrick Madden. Mr. Reale remained in the race and was defeated by Madden in the general election.

In November 2019, McLaughlin was accused of withholding his signature from documents approving a property transfer between Rensselaer County and the city of Troy associated with the South Troy Industrial Park Road project. McLaughlin later said the delay was the result of alleged unpaid bills between the two municipalities and a separate dispute over engineering services.

On December 1, 2021, McLaughlin was indicted on two felony counts, including grand larceny in the third degree for misusing campaign funds to pay personal debts. On January 25, 2023, McLaughlin was acquitted of the felony counts by a jury after one hour of deliberations.

In April 2023, several of McLaughlin’s top aides, including Crist and Gordon, were indicted by the FBI on federal criminal charges which alleged fraud and intimidation were used to obtain absentee ballots in the names of voters during the 2021 primary and general elections in Rensselaer County.

== Personal life ==
McLaughlin resides in North Greenbush with his second wife Blondie. He has two sons, Danny and Sean. Sean was a losing contestant on the 20th season of ABC’s dating series The Bachelor.
