= Kathy Marchione =

American politician

Kathleen A. Marchione

Member of the New York State Senate from the 43rd district
- In office January 1, 2013 – December 31, 2018
- Preceded by: Roy McDonald
- Succeeded by: Daphne Jordan

Saratoga County Clerk
- In office January 1997 – December 2012
- Preceded by: Rosemarie Corbett
- Succeeded by: Peter Martin

Personal details
- Born: June 13, 1955 (age 71) Halfmoon, New York, U.S.
- Party: Republican
- Spouse: Frank Marchione
- Website: Official website

Kathleen A. Marchione (born June 13, 1955) is an American politician from the state of New York. A Republican, she served as Town Clerk and Town Supervisor in the Town of Halfmoon, New York before becoming Saratoga County Clerk. She served in that role from 1997 through 2012. In 2012, Marchione was elected to the New York State Senate in District 43; she held that position from 2013 until 2018, when she declined to seek re-election. She is notable for having unseated State Senator Roy McDonald, a fellow Republican, following his 2011 vote to legalize same-sex marriage in New York.

== Life and political career ==
Marchione first entered public service at the age of 25, serving as Town Clerk in her hometown of Halfmoon. She subsequently served as Halfmoon Town Supervisor, and later as clerk of the Saratoga County Board of Supervisors. In 1997, she won a special election to be the Saratoga County Clerk following the resignation of Rosemarie Corbett. She was subsequently elected to a full term in 1998, and won re-election every four years thereafter until her election to the State Senate. Marchione served as Saratoga County Clerk from 1997 to 2012. In 2007, she was chosen as the President of the New York State Association of County Clerks.

In 2009, Marchione led a group of New York county clerks to oppose a plan to require the replacement of new license plates beginning in 2010. In her leadership role with the NYSACC, she spoke out against Gov. Eliot Spitzer's 2007 plan to allow undocumented immigrants to obtain driver's licenses; Spitzer withdrew the proposal under heavy pressure from multiple sources.

Marchione is married to Frank Marchione and lives in Halfmoon, New York. She has two children and one stepchild. She is the daughter of Hall of Fame modified stock car driver Pete Corey.

=== New York State Senate ===
==== 2012 election ====
On April 4, 2012, Marchione announced that she would challenge Sen. Roy McDonald in a Republican primary in Senate District 43. Sen. McDonald had voted for the Marriage Equality Act in 2011 after having voted "no" on same-sex marriage legislation in 2009. Marchione criticized McDonald for his same-sex marriage vote and accused him of lacking a consistent conservative voting record. She faced resistance to her primary challenge from the establishment within her own party.

The Marchione-McDonald primary was variously described as "one of three localized referend[a] on New York's 2011 same-sex marriage law" and as "divisive", "bitter," and "nasty". Initially, the results of the race were too close to call. Marchione declared victory on September 25, 2012, while Sen. McDonald's campaign announced that the senator was considering his options. Later that week, Gov. Andrew Cuomo, a Democrat, weighed in on the race by announcing his support for Sen. McDonald to continue his re-election bid on a third party line. The Troy Record reported that McDonald spent five times what Marchione did during the Republican primary contest.

Ultimately, Marchione defeated McDonald by 99 votes in the 2012 Republican primary; a total of 14,579 votes were cast. Sen. McDonald opted to cease his campaign and throw his support to Marchione. The Albany Times Union called the Marchione-McDonald primary contest "a reminder that a solid portion of the Republican base remains uncomfortable with same-sex marriage, and that grass-roots insurgents are at least an even match for the party's establishment candidates." Marchione won the November general election, defeating Democrat Robin Andrews and McDonald (who received 20,929 votes on the Independence Party line despite having suspended his campaign).

==== Senate tenure ====
Marchione began her tenure in the Senate on January 1, 2013. She was re-elected to the Senate in 2014 and 2016. In 2018, the Times Union described her as "an outspoken opponent of gun control legislation, a critic of business regulations, a voice for conservatism and an advocate for the region’s horse racing and tourism industries".

In April 2018, Marchione announced that she would not seek re-election to the Senate. She was succeeded by her legislative director, Daphne Jordan.
