= Ross Barkan =

American journalist, novelist, and politician (born 1989)

- Barkan in 2017
- Born: Ross Elliot Barkan; October 22, 1989 (age 37); New York City, U.S.
- Education: Stony Brook University (BA); New York University (MA)
- Occupations: Journalist; novelist; political candidate
- Years active: 2011–present

Ross Elliot Barkan (born October 22, 1989) is an American journalist, novelist, and essayist.

== Early life and education ==
Barkan grew up in Bay Ridge, Brooklyn. He attended Stony Brook University and earned a master's degree from New York University.

== Career ==
=== Journalist ===
Barkan was a staff reporter at the Queens Tribune. He covered New York City and national politics for the New York Observer from 2013 to 2016. In April 2016, he rose to prominence after resigning from the Observer over the newspaper's close relationship with Donald Trump, the Republican presidential candidate. The Observer's executive editor, Ken Kurson, said in an interview that he had advised Trump on a speech Trump gave before the American Israel Public Affairs Committee. Barkan resigned the day after the Observer endorsed Trump in the New York Republican primary, He later told CNN, "a line had been crossed and I thought it was time for myself to depart."

As a columnist and freelance reporter, Barkan has contributed to the Village Voice, The Guardian, The Washington Post, The New Yorker, The New York Times, The Nation, Reuters, Esquire, GQ, New York Daily News, Daily Beast, The Baffler, the Los Angeles Review of Books, and the Columbia Journalism Review. He covered the 2013 New York City mayoral race, including Anthony Weiner's campaign, and the 2016 presidential race. He also taught journalism and media studies at NYU and St. Joseph's College in Brooklyn. He was hired as a staff reporter at New York Magazine in 2022.

Barkan was a columnist for The Guardian and a columnist for Jacobin magazine. He is a contributor to The Nation.

In 2023, he was named a contributing writer to The New York Times Magazine.

In 2025, he co-founded The Metropolitan Review, a books and culture review publication, where he is editor-in-chief.

In 2026, Barkan was accused of instances of plagiarism by other journalists from The Washington Post and NPR. In response to the allegations of plagiarism, New York Magazine edited Barkan's story and announced that it would conduct a review of Barkan's prior work. The review found that Barkan failed to adhere to editorial standards, and that he wrote 67 columns out of nearly 250 without providing proper attribution of others' work. Following the review, New York Magazine ended Barkan's column in August 2026. Barkan stated to Semafor that he moved from New York to writing a new column at the Nation, which the Nation denied, stating through a spokesperson that he was not under contract. Also in August 2026, Penguin Random House suspended sales and publication of Barkan's upcoming book on Zohran Mamdani.

=== Author ===
Barkan has published fiction in Post Road, Boston College's literary magazine, and literary criticism in the Iowa Review, Harvard Review, The Rumpus, and The Brooklyn Rail.

His debut novel, Demolition Night, was published in 2018.

His second book, The Prince: Andrew Cuomo, Coronavirus, and the Fall of New York, was published in 2021. It was well-reviewed, with The Nation calling it a "swift and devastating read".

In 2022, Barkan's second novel, The Night Burns Bright, was published.

Washington Post columnist Shadi Hamid called Barkan "consistently one of the most interesting and original essayists of his generation". His third novel, Glass Century, was published in May 2025 to critical acclaim. The Wall Street Journal called it "absorbing" and "charged with heart-in-throat suspense" and George Monaghan in The New Statesman deemed it "unflaggingly bright". The Jewish Book Council reviewed the novel favorably, arguing it "earns its place in the canon of the New York City novel, along with Don Delillo’s Underworld, Tom Wolfe’s The Bonfire of the Vanities, E. L. Doctorow’s Ragtime, and many others."

His fourth novel, Colossus, was published in 2026. It earned praise from National Book Award finalist Dana Spiotta and was described by the National Review as a novel that "primes us to see a distinctly American form of grandeur and squalor, a colossus with feet of clay." A reviewer at The Pittsburgh Review of Books wrote that "the world Barkan builds in this picaresque is as sprawling and surreal as the suburbia of Cheever’s Swimmer."

=== 2018 New York State Senate primary candidacy ===
In October 2017, Barkan announced he was running in a September 2018 Democratic Party State Senate primary in New York City, planning if nominated to challenge incumbent Marty Golden. His campaign was managed by future New York City mayor Zohran Mamdani and endorsed by the New York Daily News and local politicians such as Alexandria Ocasio-Cortez, but he lost the primary to Andrew Gounardes by 15 percentage points.

In Barkan's 2018 candidate profile page on the New York City Campaign Finance Board website, he described himself as a member of the Democratic Socialists of America.

== Professional accolades ==
Barkan received the New York Press Club's award for distinguished newspaper commentary in 2017 and in 2019.

== Books ==
- Demolition Night (Tough Poets Press, 2018)
- The Prince: Andrew Cuomo, Coronavirus, and the Fall of New York (OR Books, 2021)
- The Night Burns Bright (Lake Union Publishing, 2022)
- Glass Century (Tough Poets Press, 2025)
- Fascism or Genocide: How a Decade of Political Disorder Broke American Politics (Verso Books, 2025)
- Colossus (Arcade, 2026)

== See also ==
- New Yorkers in journalism
