= Daphne Jordan =

American politician

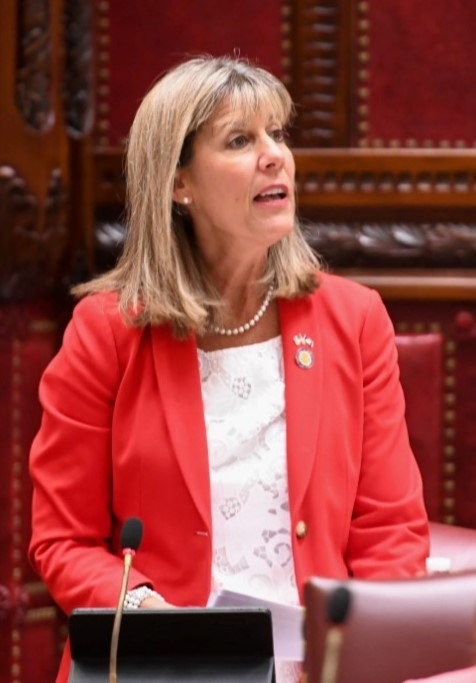
- Jordan in 2019

Member of the New York State Senate from the 43rd district
- In office January 1, 2019 – December 31, 2022
- Preceded by: Kathy Marchione
- Succeeded by: Jim Tedisco (redistricting)

Personal details
- Born: November 28, 1959 (age 66)
- Party: Republican
- Education: Lehigh University (BA); Penn State University (JD)
- Website: Official website

Daphne Veras Jordan is an American politician and attorney from the state of New York. A Republican, Jordan represented the 43rd district in the New York State Senate from 2019 to 2022. During Jordan's tenure, Senate District 43 included Columbia County and portions of Rensselaer, Saratoga, and Washington counties. Prior to her Senate tenure, Jordan served as a member of the town board in Halfmoon, New York.

== Early life and education ==
Jordan was born Daphne Veras in Philadelphia, Pennsylvania.

Jordan is of Greek descent. Her paternal ancestors came from Mytilene and Evia, while her maternal ancestors came from Skoura and Kastania.

Jordan earned a Bachelor of Arts degree in Government and English from Lehigh University in 1981. She earned a Juris Doctor from Penn State Dickinson Law in 1984.

== Early career ==
Jordan served on the Halfmoon Planning Board and the Halfmoon Zoning Board of Appeals. In 2014, Jordan was appointed to fill a vacancy on the Halfmoon Town Board. She was elected to a full term in 2015.

Jordan served as a Trustee, Member of the Executive Committee, and Treasurer for the Clifton Park-Halfmoon Public Library.

Jordan worked as a legislative director for her predecessor in the State Senate, Kathy Marchione.

== New York State Senate ==
=== Elections ===
==== 2018 State Senate election ====
In 2018, Republican Senator Kathy Marchione announced that she would not seek reelection in Senate District 43 that fall. Marchione's announcement immediately put District 43 into play as a competitive district. Following Marchione's retirement announcement, Jordan stated that she would run for State Senate in District 43.

Jordan described herself as pro-life and pro-Second Amendment. Jordan netted many endorsements, running on a platform that she said would serve as a check and balance to Governor Andrew Cuomo and the powerful New York City Democrats. Jordan opposed sanctuary cities and free college for undocumented immigrants. Jordan defeated Democrat Aaron Gladd, 67,377 votes to 59,615 votes.

==== 2020 State Senate election ====
Jordan was re-elected to the State Senate in 2020, winning her race over Democratic challenger Patrick Nelson by a margin of 86,146 to 77,425.

==== 2022 State Senate election ====
In May 2022, following redistricting, Republican State Sen. Jim Tedisco announced his intent to move into the newly redrawn 44th Senate District to challenge Jordan for the seat. This action caused controversy. On June 14, 2022, Jordan announced that she would not seek re-election to the Senate. Jordan accused Tedisco of "creating a 'circus atmosphere' in the campaign", commenting: "'I want no part of this sideshow. I’m not going to play a political game that would be destructive, divisive, and undermine the principles that I care deeply about'".

Jordan's name remained on the primary ballot; she received nearly two thousand votes on the Republican line and almost one hundred votes on the Conservative line.

=== Tenure ===
During Jordan's tenure, Senate District 43 included Columbia County and portions of Rensselaer, Saratoga, and Washington counties.

Jordan voted against the Reproductive Health Act, which codified abortion rights in New York. During the January 22, 2019 Senate floor debate on the bill, Jordan stated that "strengthening abortion rights contributes to what she calls a 'throwaway' culture. 'A baby inside its mother is not an inanimate object, it’s a life,' Jordan said. 'Think about what you’re allowing to be tossed away with a yes vote'".

Also in 2019, Jordan opposed a proposal to grant driver licenses to undocumented immigrants. Jordan argued that the measure would jeopardize public safety and open the door to identity theft, voter fraud, and non-citizen voting.

Jordan "proposed legislation that would fund a study into the short-term and long-term costs of separating New York City and the surrounding area from the rest of New York".

During her 2020 re-election campaign, Jordan expressed opposition to tax credits for the film industry and to New York's system of public funding for political campaigns. She also advocated for "a repeal of the state’s bail reform laws" and "joined fellow lawmakers in calling for an independent investigation into the state’s COVID-19-related nursing home deaths".

Jordan opposed allowing a large-scale solar farm to be approved in 2021 under an expedited state siting process.

On March 18, 2022, the American Red Cross named Jordan a Legislator of The Year.

Jordan introduced bipartisan legislation to honor philanthropist Marylou Whitney by designating a portion of the state highway system in the city of Saratoga Springs as "Marylou Whitney Way". Jordan's bill was signed into law by Governor Kathy Hochul.

In 2019, Jordan launched an effort to honor the courage of Purple Heart recipients by establishing local Purple Heart Communities across the 43rd Senate District. Within the 43rd District, all 60 towns, villages, and cities are Purple Heart Communities, and all four counties (Saratoga, Rensselaer, Washington, and Columbia) passed local resolutions to become Purple Heart Communities.

== Personal life ==
Jordan is married to Phil Jordan. During Jordan's Senate tenure, she resided with her family in Halfmoon, New York. The Jordans have two sons.
