= Marty Golden =

American politician

Martin Golden
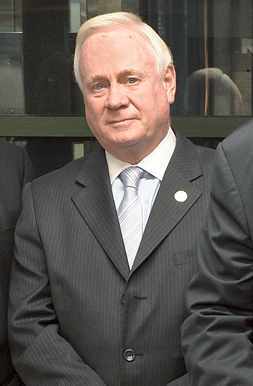
- Martin Golden

Member of the New York State Senate from the 22nd district
- In office January 20, 2003 – December 31, 2018
- Preceded by: Vincent Gentile
- Succeeded by: Andrew Gounardes

Member of the New York City Council from the 43rd district
- In office January 1, 1998 – January 20, 2003
- Preceded by: Sal F. Albanese
- Succeeded by: Vincent J. Gentile

Personal details
- Born: September 22, 1950 (age 76) Brooklyn, New York, U.S.
- Party: Republican
- Education: St. John's University
- Occupation: Politician
- Police Career
- Department: New York City Police Department
- Service years: 1973–1976; 1978–1983
- Rank: Patrolman

Martin J. Golden (born September 22, 1950) is an American politician from Brooklyn, New York, one of the five boroughs of New York City. A Republican, Golden represented the 43rd district in the New York City Council from 1998 to 2002 and represented the 22nd district of the New York State Senate from 2003 to 2018.

== Early life, family, and early career ==
Golden is the oldest of eight children born to Irish immigrants who settled in Bay Ridge. Golden attended St. Patrick's and Our Lady of Angels Grammar Schools, New York School of Printing, and John Jay College. He holds an associate's degree from St. John's University. Golden and his wife, Colleen, have two children, Michael and P.J.

Golden is a retired New York City police officer. He received 49 commendations during his seven years as an officer in the New York City Police Department. He served from 1973 until 1976 in the 67th Precinct, whereupon he was laid off due to the fiscal crisis. He was rehired in 1978. In 1978, Golden faced an Internal Affairs Investigation and a disciplinary proceeding for losing his service weapon, which he claimed was a result of his mother discarding the firearm along with an old train set while he was away "on a vacation cruise". According to Golden, he suffered a career-ending injury in 1981; while witnessing a suspected drug deal, he chased the suspect, was struck by a car, and suffered a broken arm and ligament damage to his legs. Golden has said that he retired the following year and received a three-quarters disability pension.

== Political career ==
From 1998 through 2002, Golden represented the 43rd district of the New York City Council. Golden was first elected to represent Brooklyn's 22nd Senate district in 2002. The 22nd State Senate district includes the neighborhoods of Bay Ridge, Dyker Heights, Bensonhurst, Marine Park, Gerritsen Beach, Gravesend, Manhattan Beach, and parts of Sheepshead Bay, Borough Park and Midwood.

In 2011, Golden voted against legalizing same-sex marriage in New York, stating that he considered it a "destruction of the sacrament of marriage."

Golden voted in favor of the gun control law known as the NY SAFE Act in January 2013.

In 2013, Golden was a vocal opponent of traffic enforcement cameras. In 2017, he described plans to expand the number of speed cameras near public schools in New York City as "non-starters". While in May 2018, he stated support for legislation that would double the number of speed cameras in New York City, this concession came only after Republican members of the State Senate worked to reduce the number of speed cameras from the proposed 750 to just 290. In June 2018, Golden co-sponsored legislation to eliminate all speed cameras after six months.

Following the murder of NYPD Officer Randolph Holder in 2015, Golden proposed legislation that would prevent anyone with two or more felony convictions from entering a drug treatment program as an alternative to imprisonment. Tyrone Howard, the killer of Officer Holder, had a long history of arrests but was still allowed into a diversion program in early 2015. The bill passed the Senate in 2017.

In June 2017, approximately 150 protesters rallied outside Golden's office in support of the New York Health Act, an act to establish a single-payer healthcare system in New York. Golden and his staff reportedly declined the protesters' request for him to hold a healthcare townhall.

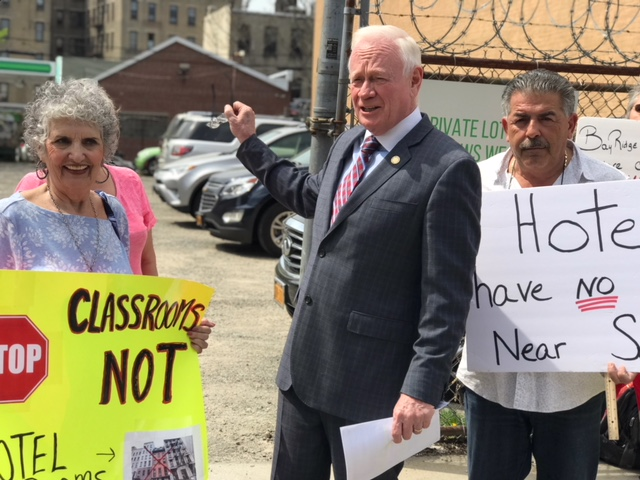
Martin Golden protests the proposed site of a hotel in March 2018

Golden has been a vocal opponent of a proposed hotel that would sit directly across from a P.S. 104 in Bay Ridge. Golden stated, "We don't want to put a hotel where we so desperately need classrooms". Since March 2018, Golden has attended three protests at the vacant lot. Golden started a petition online to help garner more support for the protest of the proposed hotel.

In September 2018, The New York Times described Golden as a "popular figure" in his district who has "consistently won support from both Republicans and Democrats, who know him for his omnipresence at scholarship dinners and senior citizens' birthday parties". He ran unopposed in four of his elections, even though Democrats hold a two-to-one voter registration advantage in the district.

In his 2018 re-election bid, Golden was defeated by Democratic challenger Andrew Gounardes by 1,100 votes.

=== Controversies ===
On August 6, 2005, Golden struck a 74-year-old woman with his SUV when she attempted to cross the street against the light. Golden provided help to the woman, and witnesses said he "was visibly shaken by the accident." Later that night, he "went to the hospital to check on her condition." The NYPD determined Golden was not at fault; no charges were filed. The woman died six months later, and Golden paid her family $750,000 to settle a lawsuit.

In 2011, the New York Daily News reported that Golden spent just under $40,000 in campaign funds at the Bay Ridge Manor, a catering hall in Bay Ridge, Brooklyn owned by Golden's brother. Golden sold the business to his brother in 2002. As of August 2011, Golden still owned the building that housed the Bay Ridge Manor and still received rent from his brother for the Manor. An investigation revealed that since Golden became Senator in 2002, he had paid $355,000 in campaign money to the Bay Ridge Manor. Golden denied nepotism, but was criticized by Michael Murphy, Susan Lerner, and other politicians. In December 2017, the Albany Times Union reported that Golden had spent more than $797,000 in campaign funds at the Bay Ridge Manor.

In 2012, Golden advertised an etiquette class for women to help them be successful in the workplace that included strategies such as "walking up and down stairs elegantly" and "sitting, standing, and walking like a model". This event, which was taxpayer-funded, was heavily criticized, and Golden eventually cancelled it.

In July 2015, Senator Golden made a controversial joke on his Facebook page regarding marijuana and same-sex marriage, stating "It all makes sense now. Gay marriage and marijuana being legalized on the same day. Leviticus 20:13 – 'if a man lays with another man he should be stoned.' We've just been interpreting it wrong all these years," He deleted the comment within hours.

In February 2017, Golden—speaking in defense of President Donald Trump's executive order barring persons from certain majority-Muslim nations from entering the United States—inaccurately claimed that a number of the terrorists involved in the 9-11 attacks lived in Bay Ridge. Golden's spokesman, John Quaglione, later claimed that Golden had confused the 9-11 attacks with the 1993 attack on the World Trade Center; one of the 1993 attackers had, in fact, lived in Bay Ridge, Brooklyn.

In June 2017, while endorsing his staffer, John Quaglione, in a local City Council race, Golden was overheard referring derisively to one of Quaglione's Democratic challengers as "Fat Boy" in front of reporters, warning a reporter present who had taken note of the gaffe not to print it or "[she] would never have a sit-down with [him] again."

In December 2017, Brian Howald, a bicyclist and member of Brooklyn Community Board 2's transportation committee, alleged that Golden, while a passenger in a vehicle that was driving illegally in the bicycle lane, impersonated a police officer and threatened to arrest him if he did not yield to Golden's vehicle. Golden denied parts of the story, including the allegation about claiming that he was a police officer.

Following the shooting at Marjory Stoneman Douglas High School in Parkland, Florida in 2018, Golden fired a staffer named Anthony Testaverde who had shared Twitter posts comparing David Hogg to Hitler and Nazi Youth.

Political offices
Preceded by Sal Albanese	Member of the New York City Council from the 43rd district 1998–2002	Succeeded by Vincent J. Gentile
New York State Senate
Preceded by Seymour P. Lachman	Member of the New York State Senate from the 22nd district 2003–2018	Succeeded by Andrew Gounardes
Preceded by Rubén Díaz Sr.	Chairman of the Senate Committee on Aging; January 2011 – January 2011	Succeeded by David Valesky
Preceded by William J. Larkin Jr.	Chairman of the Senate Committee on Civil Service and Pensions; January 2011 – December 2018	Succeeded by Andrew Gounardes
