= New York's 43rd State Senate district =

American legislative district

Senator
Jake Ashby; R–Castleton-on-Hudson
- Registration: 31.5% Republican; 30.5% Democratic; 27.0% No party preference
- Demographics: 90% White; 3% Black; 3% Hispanic; 2% Asian
- Population (2017): 297,962
- Registered voters: 214,964

New York's 43rd State Senate district is one of 63 districts in the New York State Senate. It has been represented by Republican Jake Ashby since 2023.

== Geography ==
District 43 covers all of Rensselaer County, most of Washington County and the northeast corner of Albany County.

The district overlaps with New York's 20th, and 21st congressional districts, and with the 102nd, 106th, 107th, 108th, 112th, and 113th districts of the New York State Assembly.

== Recent election results ==
=== 2026 ===
2026 New York State Senate election, District 43
Party	Candidate	Votes	%
Republican	Jake Ashby		
Conservative	Jake Ashby		
Total	Jake Ashby (incumbent)		
Democratic	Devin Lander		
Working Families	Devin Lander		
Total	Devin Lander		
Write-in			
Total votes			

=== 2024 ===
2024 New York State Senate election, District 43
Party	Candidate	Votes	%
Republican	Jake Ashby	69,824	
Conservative	Jake Ashby	11,903	
Total	Jake Ashby (incumbent)	81,727	54.6
Democratic	Alvin Gamble	67,824	45.3
Write-in		112	0.1
Total votes		149,663	100.0
Republican hold			

=== 2022 ===
2022 New York State Senate election, District 43
Party	Candidate	Votes	%
Republican	Jake Ashby	52,918	
Conservative	Jake Ashby	9,951	
Total	Jake Ashby	62,769	52.9
Democratic	Andrea Smyth	50,510	
Working Families	Andrea Smyth	5,425	
Total	Andrea Smyth	55,935	47.1
Write-in		62	0.0
Total votes		118,766	100.0
Republican hold			

=== 2020 ===
2020 New York State Senate election, District 43
Party	Candidate	Votes	%
Republican	Daphne Jordan	74,142	
Conservative	Daphne Jordan	8,944	
Independence	Daphne Jordan	3,060	
Total	Daphne Jordan (incumbent)	86,146	52.7
Democratic	Patrick Nelson	69,157	
Working Families	Patrick Nelson	8,268	
Total	Patrick Nelson	77,425	47.3
Write-in		53	0.0
Total votes		163,624	100.0
Republican hold			

=== 2018 ===
2018 New York State Senate election, District 43
Party	Candidate	Votes	%
Republican	Daphne Jordan	54,576	
Conservative	Daphne Jordan	9,240	
Independence	Daphne Jordan	2,943	
Reform	Daphne Jordan	618	
Total	Daphne Jordan	67,377	53.0
Democratic	Aaron Gladd	54,784	
Working Families	Aaron Gladd	3,433	
Women's Equality	Aaron Gladd	1,398	
Total	Aaron Gladd	59,615	46.9
Write-in		53	0.1
Total votes		127,028	100.0
Republican hold			

=== 2016 ===
2016 New York State Senate election, District 43
Party	Candidate	Votes	%
Republican	Kathy Marchione	68,172	
Conservative	Kathy Marchione	10,304	
Independence	Kathy Marchione	6,080	
Reform	Kathy Marchione	501	
Total	Kathy Marchione (incumbent)	85,057	61.1
Democratic	Shaun Francis	46,626	
Working Families	Shaun Francis	4,034	
Total	Shaun Francis	50,660	36.4
Green	Joseph Levy	3,330	2.4
Write-in		64	0.1
Total votes		139,111	100.0
Republican hold			

=== 2014 ===
2014 New York State Senate election, District 43
Party	Candidate	Votes	%
Republican	Kathy Marchione	45,196	
Conservative	Kathy Marchione	9,618	
Independence	Kathy Marchione	4,580	
Total	Kathy Marchione (incumbent)	59,394	64.3
Democratic	Brian Howard	28,045	
Working Families	Brian Howard	4,856	
Total	Brian Howard	32,901	35.6
Write-in		44	0.1
Total votes		92,339	100.0
Republican hold			

=== 2012 ===
2012 New York State Senate election, District 43
Primary election
Party	Candidate	Votes	%
Republican	Kathy Marchione	7,339	50.3
Republican	Roy McDonald (incumbent)	7,240	49.7
Write-in		0	0.0
Total votes		14,579	100.0
Conservative	Kathy Marchione	580	62.4
Conservative	Edward Gilbert	350	37.6
Write-in		0	0.0
Total votes		930	100.0
General election
Republican	Kathy Marchione	51,734	
Conservative	Kathy Marchione	9,122	
Total	Kathy Marchione	60,856	47.2
Democratic	Robin Andrews	47,022	36.5
Independence	Roy McDonald (incumbent)	20,929	16.2
Write-in		23	0.0
Total votes		128,830	100.0
Republican hold			

=== Federal results in District 43 ===
Year	Office	Results
2020	President	Biden 51.6 – 46.1%
2016	President	Trump 48.5 – 45.6%
2012	President	Obama 52.9 – 45.2%
2012	Senate	Gillibrand 67.8 – 30.9%
