= 2012 New York state elections =

- November 6, 2012

Elections were held in the State of New York on November 6, 2012. These elections included the 2012 presidential election, an election to one U.S. Senate seat, and elections to all 27 New York congressional seats, all 63 seats in the New York State Senate, and all 150 seats in the New York State Assembly.

Incumbent Democratic president Barack Obama defeated Republican nominee Mitt Romney in New York and was re-elected. Incumbent Democratic U.S. Senator Kirsten Gillibrand was re-elected as well. In New York's elections to the U.S. House of Representatives, Democrats won 21 seats and Republicans won six. The Republican Party lost its majority in the New York State Senate, as Democratic candidates won 33 of 63 seats; following the elections, however, Senate Republicans retained control of the State Senate through alliances with dissident Democrats. Democrats maintained control of the New York State Assembly.

== Presidential election ==
New York had 29 electoral votes at stake. As is the case with most states, the electors were winner-takes-all. The candidates that achieved ballot access were as follows, in order of their position on the ballot:

- Democratic Party: Barack Obama / Joe Biden
- Republican Party: Mitt Romney / Paul Ryan
- Conservative Party: Mitt Romney / Paul Ryan
- Working Families Party: Barack Obama / Joe Biden
- The Independence Party of New York, despite having automatic ballot access, will not field candidates.
- Green Party: Jill Stein / Cheri Honkala
- Party for Socialism and Liberation: Peta Lindsay / Yari Osorio
- Libertarian Party: Gary Johnson / James P. Gray
- Constitution Party: Virgil Goode / Jim Clymer

President Obama won New York by a 63.4-35.2% margin over Gov. Mitt Romney.

== United States Senate ==
Kirsten Gillibrand was appointed to the seat by Governor David Paterson in 2009, and was officially elected in a special election on November 2, 2010. Senator Gillibrand sought re-election for a full term against Republican attorney Wendy E. Long, who defeated Nassau County Comptroller George Maragos and U.S. Representative Bob Turner in a primary election for the Republican Party nomination. Sen. Gillibrand was re-elected by a margin of 72.2%-26.3% over Long.

== United States House of Representatives ==
After a loss of two seats following the 2010 United States census, the New York congressional delegation was reduced from twenty-nine to twenty-seven U.S. Representatives. The two existing districts that were eliminated were District 9, held by Republican Rep. Bob Turner, and District 22, held by retiring Democratic Rep. Maurice Hinchey. Democratic Reps. Gary Ackerman and Democratic Maurice Hinchey, as well as freshman Republican Bob Turner, did not seek re-election to the House of Representatives.

On Election Day, the Democratic Party regained the 17th and 24th districts previously held by Republicans, while the Republican Party regained the 27th district previously held by a Democrat. In total, 21 Democrats and six Republicans prevailed thereby reducing the Republican seats by two and leaving the Democrats' total unchanged.

== State Legislature ==
=== State Senate ===
Following the 2010 census, the Senate was redistricted effective in January 2013. The newly redistricted Senate was expanded from 62 to 63 seats. On June 24, 2011, same-sex marriage became legal in New York upon the enactment of the Marriage Equality Act. The passage of the Marriage Equality Act had an impact upon the 2012 State Senate elections, as three Republican senators who voted for the bill faced primary challenges and the Conservative Party of New York withdrew support for any candidate who had voted for the bill. (In New York, which allows fusion voting, Republican candidates are often endorsed by the Conservative Party.) Republican Senators Roy McDonald, James Alesi, Mark Grisanti, and Stephen Saland each voted in favor of the Marriage Equality Act. Carl Paladino, the 2010 Republican gubernatorial nominee, announced he would financially back primary candidates against Grisanti and Saland. Sen. Alesi opted to retire instead of facing a potential primary challenge; Sen. McDonald lost a Republican primary to Saratoga County Clerk Kathy Marchione; and Sen. Saland won his Republican primary, but lost the general election to Democrat Terry Gipson by a margin of approximately 2,000 votes after his primary challenger, Neil Di Carlo, remained on the ballot on the Conservative line and acted as a spoiler.

Of the four Republican state senators who voted for the Marriage Equality Act in 2011, only Sen. Grisanti was re-elected in 2012. The Conservative Party endorsed former county legislator Charles Swanick (a registered Democrat), while Carl Paladino and local Tea Party activists endorsed Republican Kevin Stocker in a primary contest against Grisanti. The Democrats nominated Hamburg Attorney Michael Amodeo, who faced a primary challenge from Swanick as well as former senator Al Coppola. Additionally, Kenmore Mayor Patrick Mang was endorsed by the Working Families Party. Amodeo and Grisanti won their respective primaries, setting up a three-way contest between Amodeo, Grisanti, and Swanick in November. Grisanti prevailed.

Democrats also gained seats in Senate Districts 17 where Democrat Simcha Felder defeated Republican incumbent David Storobin and 55 where Ted O'Brien defeated Sean Hanna. In Senate District 46, which was a new district that was created through the redistricting process following the 2010 census, the Republican candidate who was sworn in as the victor was later found, following a recount, to have lost the election. Republican George Amedore was sworn into the State Senate following the election, but a recount revealed that Democrat Cecilia Tkaczyk had defeated Amedore by 18 votes; therefore, Amedore vacated the seat, becoming the shortest-tenured senator in modern New York history. Thus, Democrats flipped three seats and won a newly created fourth.

While 33 Democrats prevailed on Election Day, the Democratic Party did not regain control of the Senate. On December 4, 2012, Senate Republicans announced a power-sharing deal with the five-member Independent Democratic Conference, which had defected from the Senate Democratic leadership in 2011. Under that agreement, Republican Leader Dean Skelos and IDC Leader Jeff Klein would alternate every two weeks as Temporary President of the Senate. The agreement allowed the Republicans and the IDC to jointly control the Senate despite the Democrats' 33-30 numerical advantage. In addition, Democratic senator-elect Simcha Felder stated that he would caucus with the Republicans.

=== State Assembly ===
On March 20, 2012, special elections were held to fill vacant seats in New York State Assembly districts 93, 100, 103, and 145. In November 2012, elections were held for all 150 Assembly seats. On Election Day, Democrats retained control of the Assembly by a wide margin.

== See also ==
- United States Senate election in New York, 2012
- United States House of Representatives elections in New York, 2012
- 2012 New York State Senate election
