= Maragos =

Maragos (Greek: Μαραγκός, literally "carpenter") is a surname. Notable people with the surname include:

- Alexandros Maragos (born 1977), Greek film director and photographer
- Andrew Maragos (born 1945), American politician
- Chris Maragos (born 1987), American football player
- George Maragos (born 1949), American politician
- Samuel C. Maragos (1922–2005), American politician and judge
- Thodoros Maragos (born 1944), Greek film director
