= 2011 New York's 9th congressional district special election =

- September 13, 2011

New York's 9th congressional district
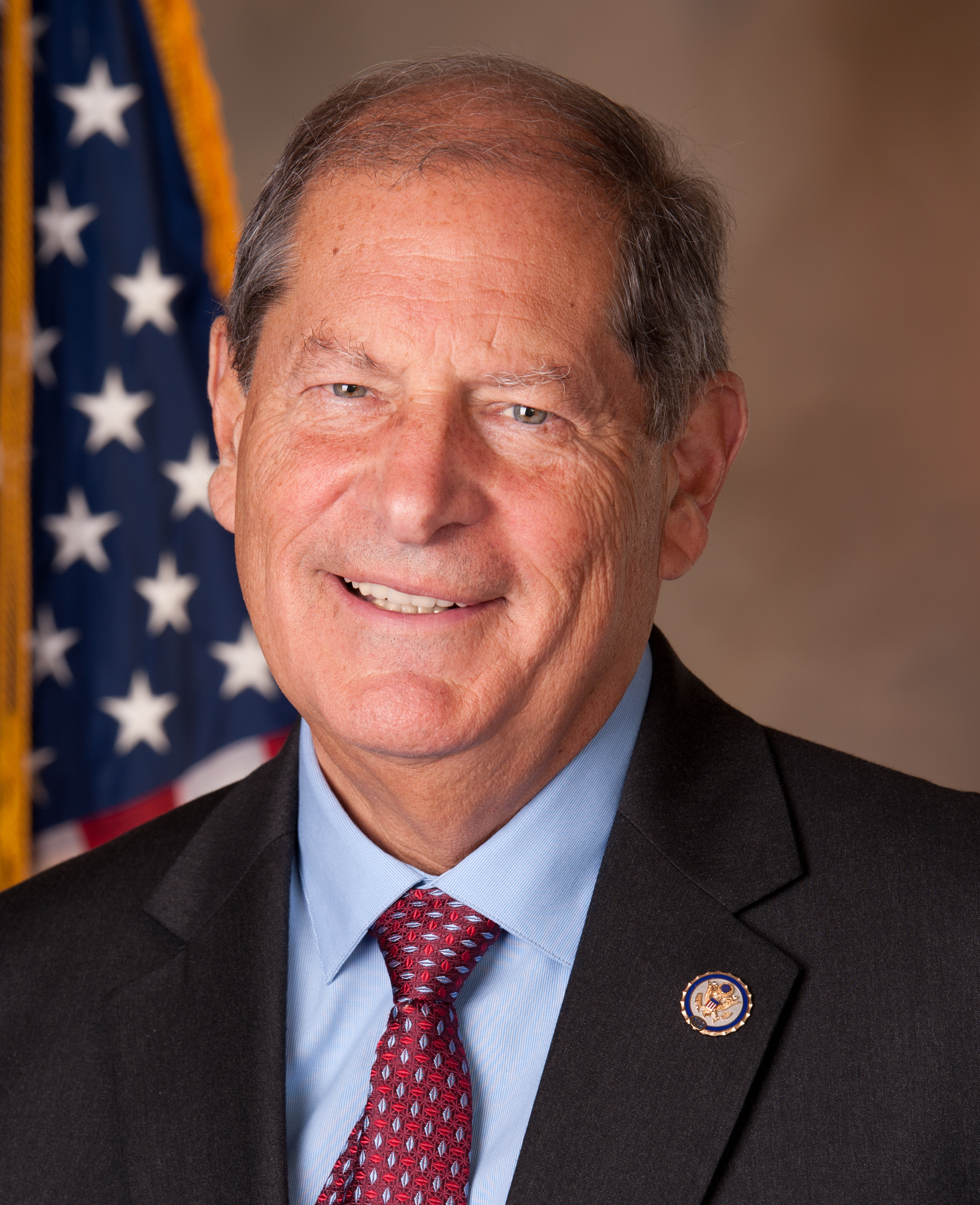

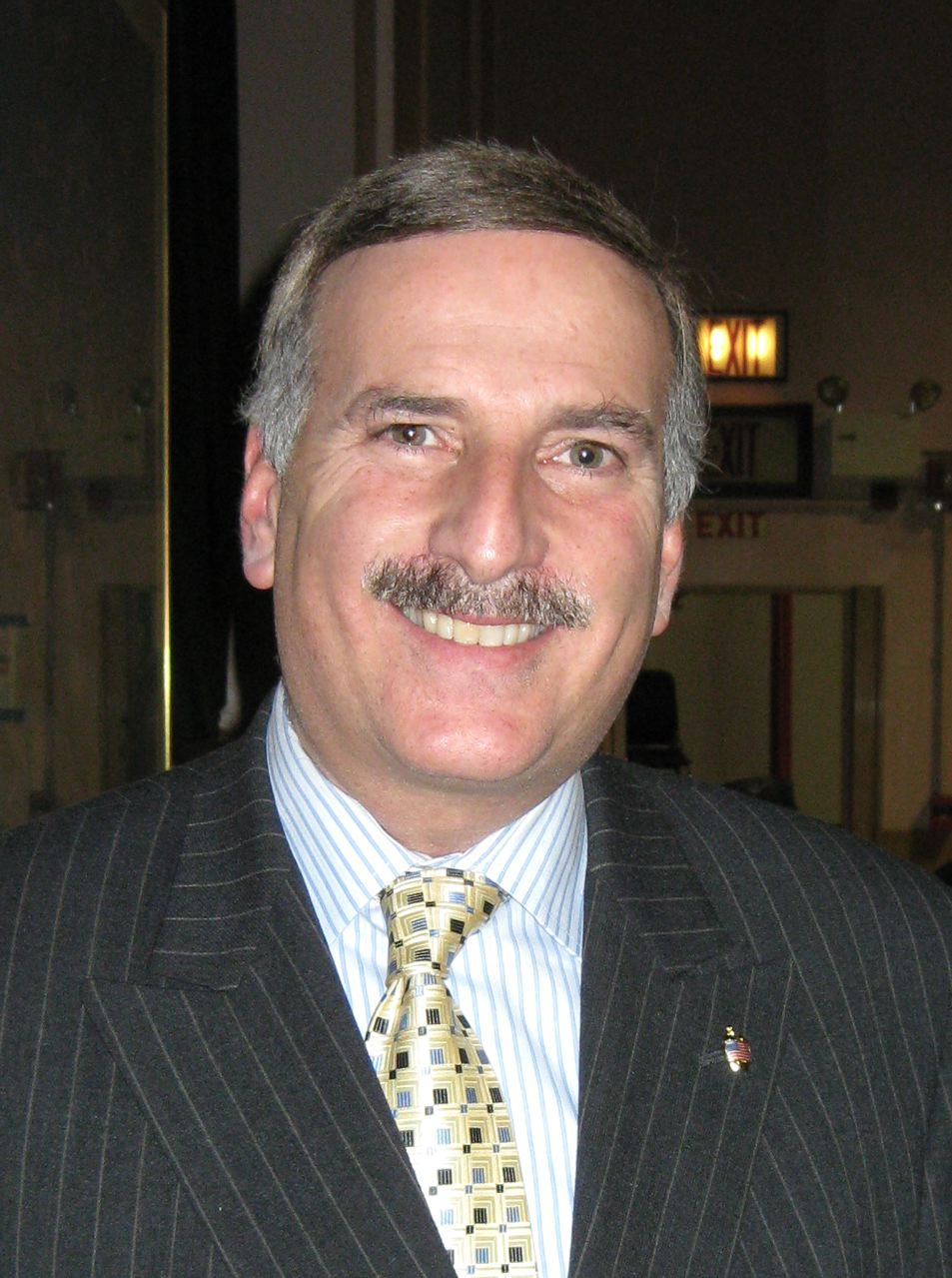
Nominee	Bob Turner	David Weprin
Party	Republican	Democratic
Alliance	Conservative	Parties: Working Families; Independence
Popular vote	37,342	33,656
Percentage	51.7%	46.6%
- Precinct results Turner: 40–50% 50–60% 60–70% 70–80% 80–90% >90% Weprin: 50–60% 60–70% 70–80% 80–90% >90% No data
U.S. Representative before election
Anthony Weiner
Democratic
Elected U.S. Representative
Bob Turner
Republican

A 2011 special election in New York's 9th congressional district was held on September 13, 2011, to fill a seat in the U.S. Congress for New York's 9th congressional district, after Representative Anthony Weiner resigned from the seat on June 21, 2011, due to his sexting scandal. Democratic Party nominee David Weprin, a member of the New York State Assembly, faced Republican and Conservative Party nominee Bob Turner, a businessman who had unsuccessfully sought the seat in 2010.

The district with over 300,000 registered voters was expected to be eliminated during the 2012 redistricting. It is strongly Democratic, where registered Democrats out number Republican by a 3-to-1 ratio.

Around midnight on September 14, the Associated Press called the race for Republican Bob Turner with 70% of precincts reporting and Turner leading Weprin 53% to 47%. Turner is the first Republican Congressman to represent this district in 88 years. The last Republican to represent the district was Andrew Petersen, who was elected in the Harding landslide of 1920.

== Background ==
On July 1, 2011, Governor Andrew Cuomo called the special election for September 13, concurrent with state primary elections, and with special elections for six vacant seats in the New York State Assembly. The deadline for the selection and approval of each party's nominee was July 19. Independent candidates also had the opportunity to petition their way onto the ballot collecting 3,500 signatures by July 13, and had a deadline of July 18. The last day for the state and county boards to certify the ballot was July 22.

=== Nomination process ===
Each of the six qualified New York parties (Democratic, Republican, Conservative, Working Families, Independence, and Green) had the opportunity to nominate candidates; the Green Party did not nominate a candidate. As the majority of the District lies within the county of Queens, each party's chairperson of this county chose the nominees: for the Democratic Party, Queens Democratic chairman, Joseph Crowley, a member of the U.S. House (representing the neighboring 7th district), and for the Republican Party, Queens Republican chairman Phil Ragusa, an accountant.

== Candidates ==
=== Democratic ===
David Weprin, a member of the New York State Assembly, was announced as the Democratic nominee on July 7, 2011. Weprin did not live in the 9th district, but rather in Holliswood, Queens in the 5th district. However, as with Kathy Hochul in the 26th district election held upstate earlier in the year, this did not disqualify Weprin from seeking or holding the office; the U.S. Constitution requires only that a person be a resident of the state, not specifically a district. Weprin was believed to have been nominated to serve as a placeholder who would not seek re-election should the district have been eliminated in the 2012 redistricting (which subsequently happened).

=== Republican ===
Bob Turner, former CEO of Multimedia Entertainment best known for producing The Jerry Springer Show, was chosen as the Republican nominee on July 8, 2011, after Councilman Eric Ulrich declined to run and Juan D. Reyes backed out of contention. Turner had been a candidate for the 9th district in 2010, and was defeated by Weiner by a 39% to 61% margin.

=== Third parties ===
==== Conservative ====
The Conservative Party of New York State endorsed Republican nominee Bob Turner in a July 9 meeting.

==== Working Families ====
The Working Families Party endorsed Democratic nominee David Weprin on July 11.

==== Independence ====
The Independence Party of New York endorsed Democratic nominee David Weprin on July 10.

==== Liberal ====
The Liberal Party of New York endorsed Republican nominee Bob Turner. The Liberal Party has not had automatic ballot access since 2002 and did not petition for it in this race.

==== Socialist Workers ====
The Socialist Workers Party organized a one-week petitioning effort to collect the 3,500 signatures necessary to get its candidate, Christopher Hoeppner, onto the special election ballot. Hoeppner and the SWP submitted 7,080 signatures and qualified for the ballot.

== General election ==
=== Campaign ===
The seat was originally considered safe for Democrats, as registered Democrats outnumber Republicans three to one in the district, but the race soon turned into a toss-up, and a referendum on President Barack Obama and his party. Obama's support, or lack thereof, of Israel in particular emerged as top issue in the district, with its thirty some percent Jewish voters.

In early August, a Siena poll showed Weprin leading with six percent, but four days before the election the poll showed Turner leading by six points, and a poll done by Public Policy Polling (PPP) two days later showed the same result, which was attributed to the unpopularity of President Obama, who had already underperformed his Democratic predecessors in the district in 2008, and the issue of Israel. PPP's president commented that "If Republicans win this race...it's real-world evidence of how unpopular Barack Obama is right now. Approval polls are one thing, but for the GOP to win in a heavily Democratic district like this would send a strong message about how unhappy voters are".

By August 24, Weprin reported raising $451,000, double the $204,000 raised by Turner. Weprin had the assistance of labor unions and strong local party organizations, and received additional financial support from national Democrats, who spent more than $600,000 on television advertisements criticizing Turner. Senator Joseph Lieberman endorsed him, Governor Andrew Cuomo and former President Bill Clinton recorded automated phone calls to voters for him, and New York Senator Charles Schumer and City Council speaker Christine Quinn campaigned with him. Turner had the support of former New York Mayor Rudolph Giuliani and former Governor George Pataki who made appearances with him. He also had the support of Assemblyman Dov Hikind, and former New York mayor Ed Koch, both Democrats and Jews.

Weprin, an Orthodox Jew whom Tablet Magazine described as "a nebbish-ey mustachioed man with a limp handshake and what appears to be a toupee" led a gaffe-prone campaign: When asked by the New York Daily News, he estimated the national debt at $4 trillion instead of $14 trillion it was at that time, and later blamed Hurricane Irene as the reason for bowing out of a scheduled debate against Turner, a day after the hurricane had passed. In early September, Weprin's campaign was accused of sending volunteers to spy on Turner's campaign. Members of Weprin's campaign denied involvement. Weprin did not deny the allegations, but denied knowledge, saying "I'm the candidate. I can't control who goes to everything."

Turner portrayed the race as a referendum on President Obama's policies and linked Weprin to the President. In the debate about the mosque near Ground Zero, Weprin has defended the "right of the mosque to build on that site". Turner chastised both him and Obama for this attitude in an advertisement, featuring images of the World Trade Center in flames.

Turner advocated that the federal budget has to be cut by as much as a third, and he also wanted to lower taxes. He insisted that the cuts would not necessarily mean reducing benefits for those who depend on government funds, particularly Social Security and Medicare. The New York Times, who endorsed Weprin, said of Turner's position: "[t]hat would take a magician, not a businessman".

Turner, a Roman Catholic, appealed to Jewish voters by criticizing President Obama's policies on Israel, and portraying Weprin, who is strongly pro-Israel, as being insufficiently critical of Obama's stance on Israel. Former New York mayor Ed Koch supported Turner in order to send a message to President Obama "that he can no longer take the Jewish community for granted" and to change what Koch described as "hostile position on the State of Israel". Koch was accused of supporting Turner out of revenge for Weprin's father Saul Weprin's not supporting him in his race for governor in 1982, but Koch denied this.

Weprin's vote in favor of legalizing same-sex marriage in the Assembly in June 2011, angered many religious Jews, who make up for about a third of the Jewish voters, and led to some Flatbush Orthodox rabbis issuing a letter prohibiting Jews from voting for Weprin or donating time or money to his campaign. Turner, who opposes same-sex marriage, avoided making it an issue in the campaign, following Ed Koch's advice. However, he was supported by local rabbis as well as Assemblyman Dov Hikind for being against gay marriage.

=== Polling ===
Poll source	Date(s) administered	Sample size	Margin of error	Bob Turner (R)	David Weprin (D)	Christopher P. Hoeppner (S)	Undecided
Siena	August 3–8, 2011	501	± 4.4%	42%	48%	—	9%
McLaughlin and Associates	August 31, 2011	300	± 5.7%	42%	42%	—	16%
Magellan Strategies	September 1, 2011	2055	± 2.2%	45%	40%	3%	12%
Siena	September 6–8, 2011	886	± 3.3%	50%	44%	—	6%
Public Policy Polling	September 8–11, 2011	664	± 3.8%	47%	41%	4%	7%
Results (for comparison)	September 13, 2011	72,197	± 0%	[ 51.7% ]	[ 46.6% ]	[ 0.2% ]	[ 1.5% ]

=== Results ===
General Election Results
Party	Candidate	Votes	%
Republican	Bob Turner	32,526	45.05
Conservative	Bob Turner	4,816	6.67
Total	Bob Turner	37,342	51.72
Democratic	David Weprin	31,285	43.33
Working Families	David Weprin	1,425	1.97
Independence	David Weprin	946	1.31
Total	David Weprin	33,656	46.62
Socialist Workers	Chris Hoeppner	143	0.20
Total votes		72,197	
Republican gain from Democratic			

==== County results ====
By county

County	Bob Turner Republican		David Weprin Democratic		All Others		Margin		Total votes
County	#	%	#	%	#	%	#	%	Total votes
Kings (part)	15,004	65.8%	7,739	33.9%	54	0.2%	7,265	31.9%	22,797
Queens (part)	22,338	46.1%	25,917	53.5%	174	0.3%	-3,579	-7.4%	48,429
Totals	37,342	51.7%	33,656	46.6%	1,199	1.7%	3,686	5.1%	72,197

== Analysis ==
The Republican upset victory is seen as a result of frustration with the weak national economy and considered a referendum on President Obama's economic policies. Commentators and politicians have also stated that the outcome of the election indicates that concerns about Obama's stance on Israel may have played a role in the election. The district has a substantial number of Jewish voters, particularly in Brooklyn, where Weprin lost 33 to 67. Many of them are ultra-Orthodox, who, while socially conservative, are fiscal liberals and sometimes will vote Republican or Russian immigrants, who tend to be politically conservative. Former New York mayor Ed Koch called the Republican win "a message to President Obama that he cannot throw Israel under a bus with impunity".

National Jewish Democratic Council President David A. Harris on the other hand stated: "One thing we know beyond the shadow of a doubt is that this election was about many things, but not Israel". The chairwoman of the Democratic National Committee, Debbie Wasserman Schultz, whose congressional district in South Florida comprises many Jewish voters, denied national ramifications saying that the district's large concentration of Orthodox Jews, who tend not to vote Democratic, made it unusual. However, Turner was the only elected Republican official from areas comprising the 9th district.

Turner's campaign manager, E. O'Brien Murray, was later named 2012 GOP campaign manager of the year, by the American Association of Political Consultants for his role in the win. The district is Democratic leaning with a Cook Partisan Voting Index (CPVI) of D+5. In Salon, which called Turner's win "unremarkable", it was argued that the district had been leaning rightward, as it was one of the few districts in the nation in which Barack Obama performed one point worse than John Kerry in 2004 and 12 points worse than Al Gore in 2000. However, Salon's claims were questioned by some as Obama had won the district in 2008 by 11 points and Kerry by 12 in 2004, which did not seem to imply a strong conservative swing. Furthermore, the local city council seat was easily won by a Democrat in the most recent election, along with the local State Senate and Assembly seats. This included a special election for New York State Assembly on the same day as Turner's election, within his congressional district, where the Democratic candidate won with 76% of the vote. Additionally, Andrew Cuomo easily won the district during his run for Governor of New York.

Turner's victory had implications on how the political boundaries of the state of New York were drawn in 2012. The 9th district was one of the two districts to be eliminated, as the state lost congressional seats because of population changes. Turner considered running for reelection. Turner nonetheless bowed out of the race after the 9th district was mostly dissolved into the newly formed 6th district, which had a greater Asian population and an even greater Democratic advantage; Turner instead ran for the U.S. Senate seat up for election in 2012, losing the Republican, and Conservative primary to Wendy Long 50% to 36%.
