= Kari Conrad =

American politician

Member of the North Dakota House of Representatives from the 3rd district
- In office December 1, 2004 – December 1, 2010
- Preceded by: Mary Nester
- Succeeded by: Andrew Maragos; Roscoe Streyle

Personal details
- Born: November 29, 1950 (age 75) Bismarck, North Dakota
- Party: Democratic

Kari Conrad (born November 29, 1950) is an American politician who served in the North Dakota House of Representatives from the 3rd district from 2004 to 2010.
