= Deslauriers =

Deslauriers is a surname. Notable people with the surname include:

- Blaine DesLauriers, American politician
- Éric Deslauriers (born 1981), Canadian football player
- Hermas Deslauriers (1879–1941), Canadian politician
- Jacques Deslauriers (1928-2018), Canadian ice hockey player
- Jean Deslauriers (1909–1978), Canadian conductor, violinist and composer
- Jeff Deslauriers (born 1984), Canadian ice hockey player
- Marcel Deslauriers (1905–1988), Canadian draughts player
- Michèle Deslauriers (born 1946), Canadian actress
- Nicolas Deslauriers (born 1991), Canadian ice hockey player
