= Lori VanWinkle =

American politician

Member of the North Dakota House of Representatives from the 3rd district
- Incumbent
- Assumed office December 1, 2022 Serving with Jeff Hoverson
- Preceded by: Bob Paulson
- Succeeded by: Timothy Mihalick (elect)

Personal details
- Party: Republican
- Education: Inver Hills Community College (AA); North Central University (BA)

Lori VanWinkle (née Miska) is an American politician. She has served as a member of the North Dakota House of Representatives from the 3rd district, alongside Jeff Hoverson. She is a member of the Republican Party.

== Early life, education, and early career ==
VanWinkle graduated from Hastings High School in Hastings, Minnesota. She went on to earn an associate's degree from Inver Hills Community College and a bachelor's degree in cultured and Biblical studies from North Central University. VanWinkle worked as a real estate agent.

== Politics ==
VanWinkle decided to enter politics in response to government mandates related to the COVID-19 pandemic, which she characterized as an infringement of personal freedom. During her campaign, she incorrectly stated that taxing property to fund schools is unconstitutional. VanWinkle campaigned on the importance of "bringing our roots back to a Biblical worldview" and was elected to the House of Representatives in November 2022.

Noted for her anti-abortion and anti-LGBTQ views, VanWinkle is a member of the far-right faction of her party, and often draws on religious themes during floor debates.

=== Tenure ===
In March 2023, VanWinkle compared students using their preferred pronouns to committing murder.

As part of the larger 2020s anti-LGBTQ movement, VanWinkle co-sponsored a total of nine state bills targeting LGBTQ people during the 2023 legislative session – the most out of any state legislator. In January 2025, she sponsored House Bill 1430, which sought to legalize conversion therapy, drawing criticism from both sides of the aisle. Organizations like the North Dakota Board of Social Work Examiners and North Dakota Chapter of the National Association of Social Workers also opposed the bill, asserting that the practice was "widely denounced as ineffective and unethical". VanWinkle argued that: "To prohibit counseling that aligns with traditional or biblical viewpoints is religious discrimination."

On February 12, 2025, VanWinkle said: “Perhaps women are going to IVF clinics because judgement is on their womb and god has effectively closed their womb.” After she faced protests over her remarks from constituents denouncing Christian nationalism, she claimed that she was "taken out of context" by the news media.

In April 2025, VanWinkle was sharply criticized for missing five days of the legislative session while on family vacation. House Majority Leader Mike Lefor, who urged her to forgo her pay, said it was "inappropriate for a legislator to take vacation during a legislative session" and indicated that he did not recall a state legislator ever doing so before. "I really thought she was joking," said House speaker Robin Weisz. "Nobody takes off for a week. We found out later she's out skiing."
