= 2016 United States Senate election in New York =

- November 8, 2016
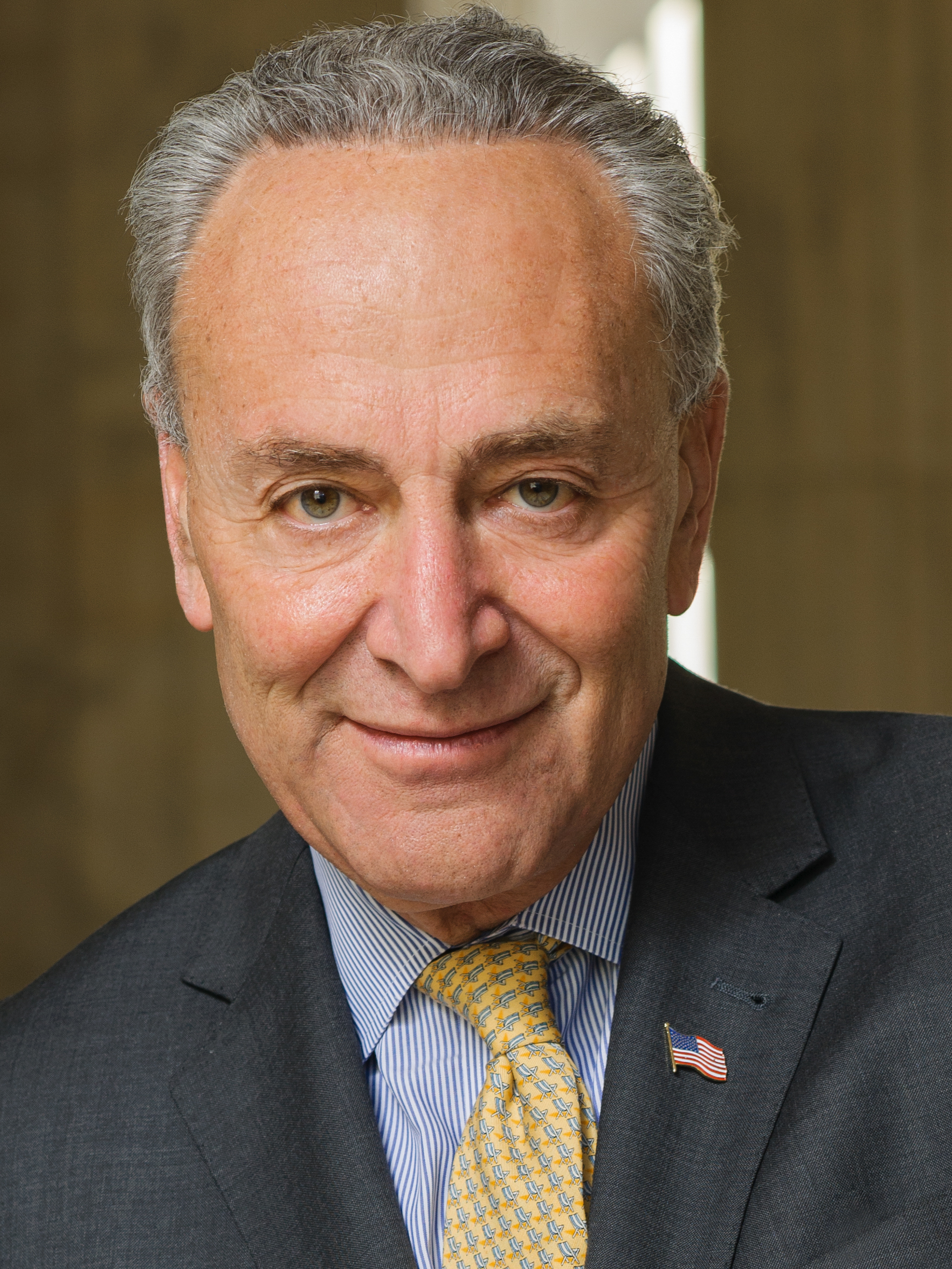

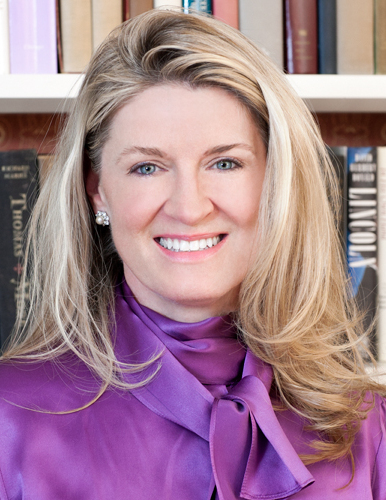
| Nominee | Chuck Schumer | Wendy Long |
| Party | Democratic | Republican |
| Alliance | Parties: Working Families; Independence; Women's Equality | Parties: Conservative; Reform |
| Popular vote | 5,221,967 | 2,009,380 |
| Percentage | 70.60% | 27.17% |
- Schumer: 40–50% 50–60% 60–70% 70–80% 80–90% >90% Long: 40–50% 50–60% 60–70% 70–80% 80–90% >90% Tie: 40–50% 50% No votes
U.S. senator before election
Chuck Schumer
Democratic
Elected U.S. Senator
Chuck Schumer
Democratic

The 2016 United States Senate election in New York was held November 8, 2016, to elect a member of the United States Senate to represent the State of New York, concurrently with the presidential election, as well as other elections to the United States Senate in other states and elections to the United States House of Representatives and various state and local elections. The primaries took place on June 28. This was the last time any U.S. Senate candidate in New York won a general election by more than 35 percentage points.

Incumbent Democratic Senator Chuck Schumer won re-election to a fourth term in office. This was considered by many polling aggregate groups to be one of the safest Democratic seats in the nation for this cycle. The prediction turned out to be correct, with Schumer winning around 71% of the vote and all but five of the state's 62 counties: Hamilton, Orleans, Wyoming, Allegany and Steuben.

== Democratic primary ==
=== Candidates ===
==== Declared ====
- Chuck Schumer, incumbent U.S. Senator

== Republican primary ==
=== Candidates ===
==== Declared ====
- Wendy Long, attorney and nominee for the U.S. Senate in 2012

==== Declined ====
- Richard L. Hanna, U.S. Representative
- Larry Kudlow, economist, television personality and columnist
- Adele Malpass, Chairwoman of the Manhattan Republican Party and wife of 2010 Senate candidate David Malpass

== Third-party and independent candidates ==
=== Libertarian Party ===
- Alex Merced, activist

=== Green Party ===
- Robin Laverne Wilson

=== Conservative Party ===
- Wendy Long, attorney and nominee for the U.S. Senate in 2012

== General election ==
=== Debates ===
| Dates | Location | Schumer | Long | Link |
|---|---|---|---|---|
| October 30, 2016 | Schenectady, New York | Participant | Participant | |

=== Endorsements ===
Chuck Schumer

U.S. senators

- Al D'Amato, former U.S. senator from New York, 1981-1999 (Republican)

Media companies

- Advance Media New York Editorial Board

=== Predictions ===
| Source | Ranking | As of |
|---|---|---|
| The Cook Political Report | Safe D | November 2, 2016 |
| Sabato's Crystal Ball | Safe D | November 7, 2016 |
| Rothenberg Political Report | Safe D | November 3, 2016 |
| Daily Kos | Safe D | November 8, 2016 |
| Real Clear Politics | Safe D | November 7, 2016 |

=== Polling ===
| Poll source | Date(s) administered | Sample size | Margin of error | Chuck Schumer (D) | Wendy Long (R) | Other | Undecided |
|---|---|---|---|---|---|---|---|
| SurveyMonkey | November 1–7, 2016 | 2,208 | ± 4.6% | 71% | 25% | — | 4% |
| SurveyMonkey | October 31–November 6, 2016 | 2,132 | ± 4.6% | 71% | 25% | — | 4% |
| Siena College | November 3–4, 2016 | 617 | ± 4.5% | 67% | 25% | — | 8% |
| SurveyMonkey | October 28–November 3, 2016 | 1,949 | ± 4.6% | 71% | 26% | — | 3% |
| SurveyMonkey | October 27–November 2, 2016 | 1,755 | ± 4.6% | 70% | 26% | — | 4% |
| SurveyMonkey | October 26–November 1, 2016 | 1,645 | ± 4.6% | 70% | 27% | — | 3% |
| SurveyMonkey | October 25–31, 2016 | 1,734 | ± 4.6% | 68% | 28% | — | 4% |
| Siena College | October 13–17, 2016 | 611 | ± 4.6% | 66% | 27% | 1% | 6% |
| NBC 4 NY/WSJ/Marist | September 21–23, 2016 | 676 | ± 3.8% | 70% | 24% | 1% | 6% |
| Siena College | September 11–15, 2016 | 600 | ± 5.0% | 69% | 23% | — | 8% |
| Emerson College | August 28–30, 2016 | 800 | ± 3.4% | 60% | 23% | 4% | 12% |
| Siena College | August 7–10, 2016 | 717 | ± 4.3% | 63% | 24% | — | 13% |
| Quinnipiac University | July 13–17, 2016 | 1,104 | ± 3.0% | 60% | 28% | 1% | 8% |
| Siena College | June 22–28, 2016 | 803 | ± 4.0% | 66% | 23% | — | 11% |
| Siena College | May 22–26, 2016 | 825 | ± 3.9% | 64% | 22% | — | 14% |
| Siena College | April 24–27, 2016 | 802 | ± 4.1% | 64% | 24% | — | 12% |
| Public Policy Polling | April 7–10, 2016 | 1,403 | ± 2.6% | 55% | 23% | — | 22% |
| Quinnipiac University | March 22–29, 2016 | 1,667 | ± 2.4% | 63% | 24% | — | 11% |

=== Results ===
United States Senate election in New York, 2016
| Party | Candidate | Votes | % | ±% |
|---|---|---|---|---|
| Democratic | Chuck Schumer | 4,784,218 | 64.68% | +6.25% |
| Working Families | Chuck Schumer | 241,672 | 3.27% | −0.73% |
| Independence | Chuck Schumer | 150,654 | 2.04% | −1.82% |
| Women's Equality | Chuck Schumer | 45,401 | 0.61% | N/A |
| Total | Chuck Schumer (incumbent) | 5,221,945 | 70.60% | +4.31% |
| Republican | Wendy Long | 1,723,920 | 23.31% | −3.65% |
| Conservative | Wendy Long | 267,622 | 3.62% | −1.62% |
| Reform | Wendy Long | 17,813 | 0.24% | N/A |
| Total | Wendy Long | 2,009,355 | 27.17% | −5.03% |
| Green | Robin Laverne Wilson | 113,415 | 1.53% | +0.61% |
| Libertarian | Alex Merced | 48,120 | 0.65% | +0.11% |
| Write ins | Write ins | 3,489 | 0.05% | |
| Total votes | | 7,396,371 | 100.0% | N/A |
| Democratic hold | | | | |

==== Results by county ====
| County | Chuck Schumer Democratic | | Wendy Long Republican | | Various candidates | | Margin | | Total votes cast |
| County | # | % | # | % | # | % | # | % | Total votes cast |
|---|---|---|---|---|---|---|---|---|---|
| Albany | 98,287 | 72.5% | 33,755 | 24.9% | 3,606 | 2.7% | 64,532 | 47.6% | 135,648 |
| Allegany | 7,881 | 44.1% | 9,614 | 53.8% | 376 | 2.0% | −1,733 | −9.7% | 17,871 |
| Bronx | 344,113 | 91.6% | 25,905 | 6.9% | 5,723 | 1.6% | 318,208 | 84.7% | 375,741 |
| Broome | 51,929 | 63.1% | 28,156 | 34.2% | 2,216 | 2.7% | 23,773 | 28.9% | 82,301 |
| Cattaraugus | 15,297 | 51.9% | 13,495 | 45.8% | 655 | 2.2% | 1,802 | 6.1% | 29,447 |
| Cayuga | 19,796 | 61.9% | 11,536 | 36.1% | 667 | 2.0% | 8,260 | 25.8% | 31,999 |
| Chautauqua | 29,743 | 56.8% | 21,614 | 41.3% | 1,027 | 1.9% | 8,129 | 15.5% | 52,384 |
| Chemung | 18,775 | 54.5% | 14,994 | 43.5% | 698 | 2.0% | 3,781 | 11.0% | 34,467 |
| Chenango | 10,111 | 52.8% | 8,463 | 44.2% | 578 | 3.1% | 1,648 | 8.6% | 19,152 |
| Clinton | 18,955 | 62.0% | 10,802 | 35.4% | 799 | 2.6% | 8,153 | 26.6% | 30,556 |
| Columbia | 18,893 | 63.3% | 10,101 | 33.8% | 849 | 2.8% | 8,792 | 29.5% | 29,843 |
| Cortland | 11,857 | 60.9% | 7,048 | 36.2% | 551 | 2.8% | 4,809 | 24.7% | 19,456 |
| Delaware | 9,635 | 50.6% | 8,932 | 46.9% | 461 | 2.5% | 703 | 3.7% | 19,028 |
| Dutchess | 72,681 | 58.3% | 48,959 | 39.3% | 3,065 | 2.4% | 23,722 | 19.0% | 124,705 |
| Erie | 284,110 | 69.2% | 118,072 | 28.8% | 8,323 | 2.0% | 166,038 | 40.4% | 410,505 |
| Essex | 8,829 | 55.3% | 6,577 | 41.2% | 562 | 3.5% | 2,252 | 14.1% | 15,968 |
| Franklin | 9,640 | 59.5% | 6,116 | 37.7% | 453 | 2.7% | 3,524 | 21.8% | 16,209 |
| Fulton | 10,237 | 51.2% | 9,357 | 46.8% | 401 | 2.0% | 880 | 4.4% | 19,995 |
| Genesee | 12,343 | 49.0% | 12,245 | 48.6% | 601 | 2.3% | 98 | 0.4% | 25,189 |
| Greene | 10,823 | 51.1% | 9,863 | 46.5% | 505 | 2.4% | 960 | 4.6% | 21,191 |
| Hamilton | 1,444 | 47.0% | 1,572 | 51.1% | 58 | 1.8% | −128 | −4.1% | 3,074 |
| Herkimer | 13,702 | 55.6% | 10,376 | 42.1% | 571 | 2.3% | 3,326 | 13.5% | 24,649 |
| Jefferson | 20,711 | 56.3% | 15,245 | 41.5% | 806 | 2.2% | 5,466 | 14.8% | 36,762 |
| Kings | 659,982 | 86.0% | 83,820 | 10.9% | 23,335 | 3.1% | 576,162 | 75.1% | 767,137 |
| Lewis | 5,492 | 51.0% | 5,106 | 47.4% | 181 | 1.7% | 386 | 3.6% | 10,779 |
| Livingston | 14,984 | 52.1% | 13,090 | 45.5% | 690 | 2.4% | 1,894 | 6.6% | 28,764 |
| Madison | 16,706 | 58.0% | 11,363 | 39.4% | 758 | 2.6% | 5,343 | 18.6% | 28,827 |
| Monroe | 226,493 | 67.0% | 103,400 | 30.6% | 8,049 | 2.4% | 123,093 | 36.4% | 337,942 |
| Montgomery | 10,357 | 57.2% | 7,332 | 40.5% | 432 | 2.4% | 3,025 | 16.7% | 18,121 |
| Nassau | 403,274 | 64.7% | 210,823 | 33.8% | 8,876 | 1.4% | 192,451 | 30.9% | 622,973 |
| New York | 553,432 | 86.4% | 69,536 | 10.9% | 17,755 | 2.8% | 483,896 | 75.5% | 640,723 |
| Niagara | 52,114 | 59.6% | 33,662 | 38.5% | 1,725 | 2.0% | 18,452 | 21.1% | 87,501 |
| Oneida | 51,245 | 59.5% | 32,899 | 38.2% | 1,973 | 2.3% | 18,346 | 21.3% | 86,117 |
| Onondaga | 143,126 | 69.9% | 57,174 | 27.9% | 4,597 | 2.2% | 85,952 | 42.0% | 204,897 |
| Ontario | 29,001 | 57.3% | 20,344 | 40.2% | 1,253 | 2.4% | 8,657 | 17.1% | 50,598 |
| Orange | 87,368 | 59.8% | 55,727 | 38.1% | 3,004 | 2.0% | 31,641 | 21.7% | 146,099 |
| Orleans | 7,099 | 45.6% | 8,150 | 52.4% | 305 | 1.9% | −1,051 | −6.8% | 15,554 |
| Oswego | 26,172 | 56.8% | 18,780 | 40.8% | 1,107 | 2.4% | 7,392 | 16.0% | 46,059 |
| Otsego | 14,059 | 57.4% | 9,758 | 39.9% | 669 | 2.7% | 4,301 | 17.5% | 24,486 |
| Putnam | 24,635 | 53.4% | 20,588 | 44.6% | 920 | 2.0% | 4,047 | 8.8% | 46,143 |
| Queens | 541,334 | 82.7% | 99,252 | 15.2% | 14,262 | 2.2% | 442,082 | 67.5% | 654,848 |
| Rensselaer | 43,897 | 63.3% | 23,577 | 34.0% | 1,928 | 2.7% | 20,320 | 29.3% | 69,420 |
| Richmond | 108,147 | 62.3% | 62,979 | 36.3% | 2,593 | 1.5% | 45,168 | 26.0% | 173,719 |
| Rockland | 82,386 | 65.2% | 41,894 | 33.2% | 2,023 | 1.6% | 40,492 | 32.0% | 126,303 |
| St. Lawrence | 22,755 | 61.0% | 13,633 | 36.6% | 910 | 2.4% | 9,122 | 24.6% | 37,298 |
| Saratoga | 65,362 | 59.0% | 42,709 | 38.6% | 2,686 | 2.4% | 22,653 | 20.4% | 110,757 |
| Schenectady | 42,649 | 65.4% | 20,985 | 32.2% | 1,569 | 2.3% | 21,664 | 33.2% | 65,203 |
| Schoharie | 6,721 | 49.4% | 6,606 | 48.5% | 288 | 2.1% | 115 | 0.9% | 13,615 |
| Schuyler | 4,075 | 48.8% | 4,026 | 48.2% | 245 | 3.0% | 49 | 0.4% | 8,346 |
| Seneca | 7,746 | 57.4% | 5,364 | 39.8% | 379 | 2.7% | 2,382 | 17.8% | 13,489 |
| Steuben | 18,743 | 46.6% | 20,638 | 51.3% | 831 | 2.0% | −1,895 | −4.7% | 40,212 |
| Suffolk | 390,754 | 60.1% | 247,391 | 38.1% | 11,864 | 1.8% | 143,363 | 22.0% | 650,009 |
| Sullivan | 16,770 | 59.7% | 10,641 | 37.9% | 658 | 2.3% | 6,129 | 21.8% | 28,069 |
| Tioga | 10,661 | 49.5% | 10,345 | 48.0% | 551 | 2.6% | 316 | 1.5% | 21,557 |
| Tompkins | 30,349 | 73.6% | 8,815 | 21.4% | 2,096 | 5.1% | 21,534 | 52.2% | 41,260 |
| Ulster | 52,598 | 64.6% | 26,029 | 32.0% | 2,764 | 3.3% | 26,569 | 32.6% | 81,391 |
| Warren | 17,885 | 59.5% | 11,164 | 37.2% | 986 | 3.3% | 6,721 | 22.3% | 30,035 |
| Washington | 13,246 | 55.8% | 9,787 | 41.3% | 693 | 2.9% | 3,459 | 14.5% | 23,726 |
| Wayne | 19,704 | 51.2% | 17,929 | 46.6% | 866 | 2.2% | 1,775 | 4.6% | 38,499 |
| Westchester | 287,893 | 71.4% | 108,127 | 26.8% | 7,161 | 1.7% | 179,766 | 44.6% | 403,181 |
| Wyoming | 7,756 | 46.0% | 8,843 | 52.4% | 280 | 1.6% | −1,087 | −6.4% | 16,879 |
| Yates | 5,205 | 53.6% | 4,297 | 44.2% | 211 | 2.1% | 908 | 9.4% | 9,713 |
| Totals | 5,221,967 | 70.60% | 2,009,380 | 27.17% | 165,024 | 2.23% | 3,212,587 | 43.43% | 7,396,371 |

Counties that flipped from Republican to Democratic

- Tioga (largest municipality: Waverly)

Counties that flipped from Democratic to Republican

- Alleghany (largest municipality: Wellsville)
- Orleans (largest municipality: Albion)
- Steuben (largest municipality: Corning)

==== By congressional district ====
Schumer won all 27 congressional districts, including nine that elected Republicans.

| District | Schumer | Long | Representative |
|---|---|---|---|
| 1st | 58% | 40% | Lee Zeldin |
| 2nd | 61% | 38% | Peter T. King |
| 3rd | 64% | 35% | Steve Israel |
| 3rd | 64% | 35% | Thomas Suozzi |
| 4th | 66% | 32% | Kathleen Rice |
| 5th | 90% | 9% | Gregory Meeks |
| 6th | 75% | 22% | Grace Meng |
| 7th | 88% | 8% | Nydia Velázquez |
| 8th | 89% | 8% | Hakeem Jeffries |
| 9th | 89% | 9% | Yvette Clarke |
| 10th | 82% | 15% | Jerry Nadler |
| 11th | 64% | 34% | Dan Donovan |
| 12th | 83% | 14% | Carolyn Maloney |
| 13th | 92% | 5% | Charles B. Rangel |
| 13th | 92% | 5% | Adriano Espaillat |
| 14th | 84% | 14% | Joe Crowley |
| 15th | 95% | 4% | Jose Serrano |
| 16th | 80% | 19% | Eliot Engel |
| 17th | 68% | 30% | Nita Lowey |
| 18th | 59% | 39% | Sean Patrick Maloney |
| 19th | 58% | 39% | John Faso |
| 20th | 68% | 30% | Paul Tonko |
| 21st | 57% | 40% | Elise Stefanik |
| 22nd | 59% | 38% | Richard L. Hanna |
| 22nd | 59% | 38% | Claudia Tenney |
| 23rd | 56% | 42% | Tom Reed |
| 24th | 66% | 32% | John Katko |
| 25th | 68% | 30% | Louise Slaughter |
| 26th | 74% | 23% | Brian Higgins |
| 27th | 55% | 43% | Chris Collins |
