= Andrew Maragos =

American politician (born 1945)

Andrew G. Maragos

Member of the North Dakota House of Representatives from the 3rd district
- In office 2011–2018 Serving with Roscoe Streyle
- Succeeded by: Jeff Hoverson; Bob Paulson

Personal details
- Born: January 21, 1945 (age 81) Minot, North Dakota, United States
- Party: Republican

Andrew G. Maragos (born January 21, 1945) is an American politician. He was a member of the North Dakota House of Representatives from the 3rd District from 1993 to 2006 and again from 2011 to 2018. He is a member of the Republican party.
