= Alexandros Maragos =

Greek filmmaker and photographer

- Αλέξανδρος Μαραγκός
- Born: 15 September 1977 (age 49); Athens, Greece
- Other name: Alexandros Maragkos
- Occupations: Filmmaker, photographer
- Website: alexandrosmaragos.com

Alexandros Maragos (Greek: Αλέξανδρος Μαραγκός; born 15 September 1977) is a filmmaker and photographer. He is known for his landscape photography, night photography and timelapse imagery. His astrophotography work has been recognized by NASA as Astronomy Picture of the Day.

== Life and filmmaking career ==
Maragos was born in Athens, Greece, in 1977. He has been involved in documentaries, films, television programs and photography projects in various capacities.

Maragos' cinematography credits include the feature documentary Balkan Spirit, directed by Hermann Vaske, featuring Angelina Jolie, Marina Abramović, Goran Bregović, Emir Kusturica, Isabelle Huppert, Anamaria Marinca, Slavoj Žižek and Phedon Papamichael, the feature documentary Love in the Time of Crisis produced by Paul Mason and 300: Rise of an Empire where he was among the cinematographers of an 11-part documentary series on the official Blu-ray/DVD release.

Maragos has directed four short documentaries, including the 2014 short Phedon Papamichael: A Life Behind The Lens about the career of the Oscar-nominated cinematographer Phedon Papamichael and the short documentary Chris Kenneally: The Making of "Side by Side" Documentary about the making of the feature documentary Side by Side.

In November 2017, Maragos announced the non-narrative short film, City of Athens.

== Photography career ==
Maragos is known for his diverse and dynamic visual style. He is self-taught, having learned photography through experimenting and independent study.

His photography and timelapse imagery has been featured by international organizations and publications including NASA, National Geographic, BBC, and has been licensed by corporations such as Microsoft, Samsung, IBM, Hitachi, Google, Yahoo, Time Inc., Ogilvy & Mather, Saatchi & Saatchi, The Washington Post, ABC, NBC News, Viacom Media Networks, Lonely Planet Publications, Boeing, Verizon, Virgin, ING Bank, Bank of the West, Shell International and more.

In 2011, BBC's monthly documentary series on astronomy The Sky at Night acquired his photography and the same year, the International Centre for Life in the UK included his timelapse imagery on the digital planetarium show On the Shoulders of Giants.

In 2012, Getty Images invited him to join the agency. Since then, he is a Getty Images contributing photographer and member of the Getty Images Global Assignments Roster.

In 2014, the Institute for Astronomy, Astrophysics, Space Applications and Remote Sensing of the National Observatory of Athens used Maragos' photography to decorate its facilities in Penteli, Greece.

Maragos has received honors and awards at the International Photography Awards, the Px3 Prix de la Photographie Paris Awards, the International Earth & Sky Photo Contest and more.

=== Mosaic of Change Architectural Projections ===
In 2015, Maragos was one of the 20 artists from around the world who were invited to participate in the "Mosaic of Change Live Architectural Projection Experience" show in Paris, France, in celebration of UNESCO's 70th anniversary. A large-scale projection show canvassing the exterior facades of UNESCO's headquarters at Place de Fontenoy. Maragos' timelapse work "The Milky Way over Greece" was edited with the voice of French historian and intellectual Alain Daniélou and projected onto UNESCO's headquarters' buildings by San Francisco-based creative studio Obscura Digital.

== Filmography ==
Year	Title	Role	Notes
2011	Black Rock Santorini	Director, cinematographer, editor	Short documentary
2012	My Excuse: The Band	Director, cinematographer, editor	Short documentary
2013	Balkan Spirit	Co-cinematographer	Feature documentary
2014	Chris Kenneally: The Making of "Side by Side" Documentary	Director, cinematographer, editor	Short documentary
2014	Phedon Papamichael: A Life Behind the Lens	Director, cinematographer, editor	Short documentary / cinematographer profile
2014	Love in the Time of Crisis	Cinematographer	Feature documentary
2014	300: Rise of an Empire	Additional cinematography	Official short documentary series
2018	City of Athens	Director, cinematographer, editor	Non-narrative short film
