= Bob Paulson (politician) =

American politician

Member of the North Dakota Senate from the 3rd district
- Incumbent
- Assumed office December 1, 2022
- Preceded by: Oley Larsen

Member of the North Dakota House of Representatives from the 3rd district
- In office December 1, 2018 – December 1, 2022
- Preceded by: Andrew Maragos; Roscoe Streyle
- Succeeded by: Lori VanWinkle

Personal details
- Party: Republican
- Spouse: Sheryll
- Children: 10
- Education: BBA, Evangel University
- Occupation: Rancher, Politician

Bob Paulson is a Republican politician who has served North Dakota's 3rd legislative district in the North Dakota Senate since 2022. He previously represented the third district in the North Dakota House of Representatives. Paulson is also a retired navy pilot and rancher.
