= Obscura Digital =

American digital art studio

Obscura Digital is a creative studio located in historic Pier 70 in the Dogpatch District of San Francisco, California.

Combining innovative technology with creative expression, Obscura designs and develops immersive, interactive digital art installations and experiences around the world. Obscura works with Fortune 100 companies, cultural dignitaries, and global foundations to communicate transformative messages using original content for emerging technologies. Obscura specializes in custom video content, large scale interactive displays, architectural installations, kinetic sculpture, stage shows, and projection mapping that turns nearly any surface into a video screen.

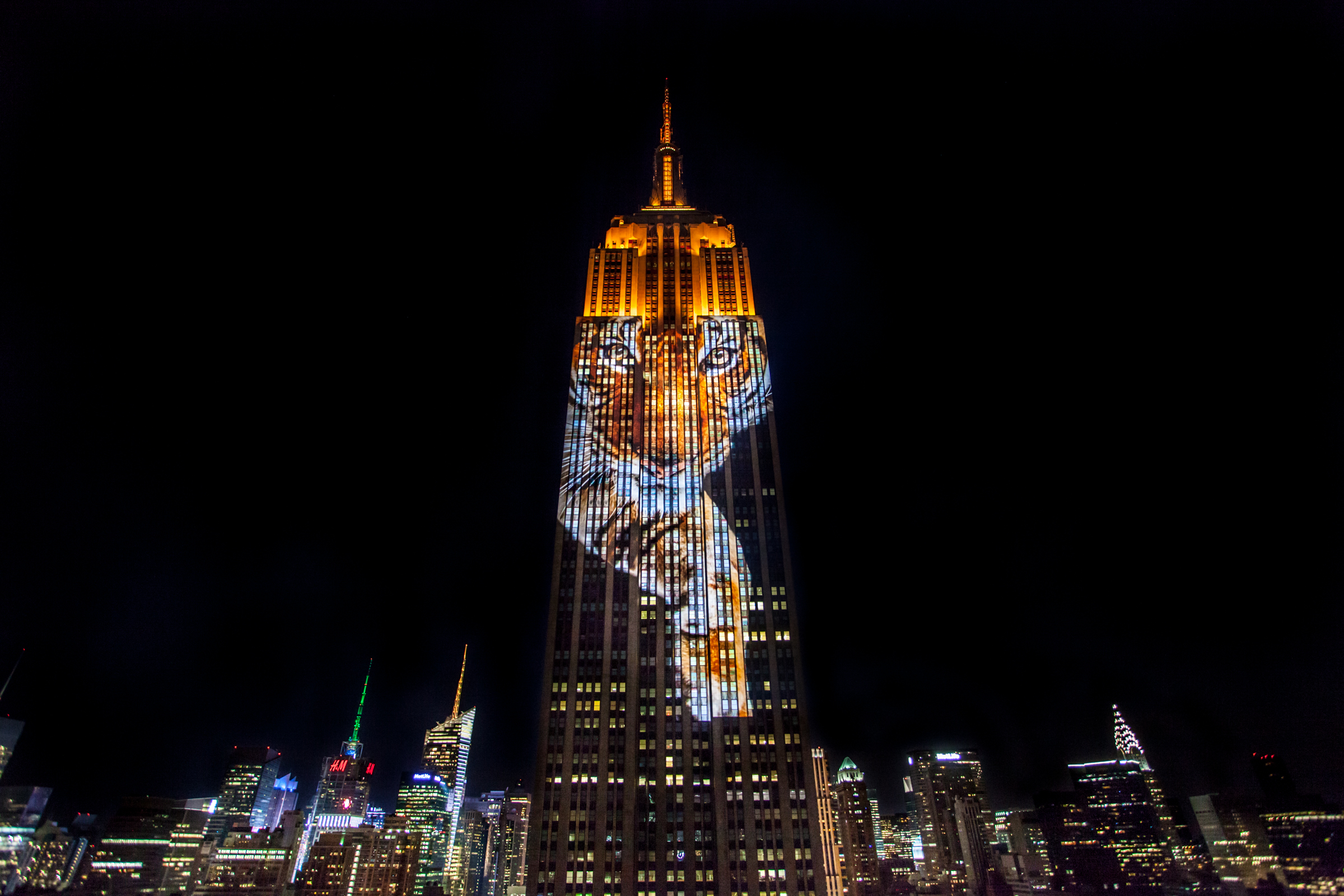
Obscura Digital projected of images of endangered species on the Empire State Building for the film "Racing Extinction", 2015.

Obscura is best known for first-of-its-kind, large-scale projection mapping events on St Peter's Basilica at the Vatican and the Empire State Building in 2015, in conjunction with the film Racing Extinction. The Empire State Building project was named Modern Met's Top 15 Most Remarkable Art Installations and (combined with the Vatican event) achieved 5.4 billion media impressions globally. Other notable events include projecting an 8-minute program entitled "Chrysalis" in the world's largest geodesic projection dome (at 120 feet diameter) for Coachella; projecting real-time election results, maps, images of seminal moments in American history, and photos from the campaign trail on the south façade of the Empire State Building during CNN's 2016 election night coverage; and projecting seminal images from Harper's Bazaar on the north façade of the Empire State Building celebrating Harper's' 150th anniversary.

Other notable work includes permanent installations such as the LiveFX Board at AT&T Stadium in Dallas, the 52-foot RFID-triggered wall at the College Football Hall of Fame in Atlanta, and the immersive LED wall in the Salesforce office building lobby at 50 Fremont Street in San Francisco.

== History ==
Travis Threlkel, Chris Lejeune, Leo Raderman founded the company in July 2000, and assembled a small team to work out of a South of Market warehouse, with Threlkel overseeing creative, technology, Lejeune overseeing Design and Production, and Raderman as Chairman. In 2002, Patrick Connolly joined Obscura as the company's CEO and was instrumental in growing the business in its early years. Threlkel continued as Chief Creative Officer, Chris Lejeune as COO and Raderman as Chairman. In 2009, Chris Lejeune became CEO and together with Travis Threlkel elevated the scale of the company to the World class visionary company Obscura is known as. Chris Lejeune Successfully managed the company through Acquisition by Madison Square Garden Company in November 2017. At the Time of Sale to MSG Obscura employed a team of over 70 artists, technologists, builders, and strategists, working in three main categories: live events, installations, and experimental technologies with tangible prototypes.

== Key projects and collaborations ==
Temporary installations and projection events:

- 2017 – "Chrysalis" in The Antarctic dome, Coachella Valley Music and Arts Festival
- 2017 – Harper's Bazaar 150th Anniversary projections on the Empire State Building
- 2017 – "Sight Machine" with Trevor Paglen
- 2016 – CNN Election Night Projections on Empire State Building
- 2016 – Qasr Al Hosn Festival
- 2016 – Pier 70 Super Bowl Concert Series featuring Dave Matthews, Red Hot Chili Peppers, Run DMC and Snoop Dogg
- 2016 – Visa Super Bowl Skyline Projections
- 2016 – #BeAModelMan / Representation Project
- 2015 – Vatican “Fiat Lux: Illuminating Our Common Home”
- 2015 – Oceanic Preservation Society “Projecting Change: Empire State Building”
- 2015 – NASA planetarium shows: International Space Station and Journey to Mars
- 2015 – UNESCO's 70th Anniversary Celebration
- 2015 – Grateful Dead Fare Thee Well Concerts
- 2015 – San Francisco's City Hall Centennial Celebration
- 2015 – Brandcast US & UK
- 2015 – YouTube Creators' Summit
- 2015 – Kuwait Towers: 54th National Day
- 2014 – IllUmiNations: United Nations People's March
- 2014 – Tesla Guerilla Projections for Racing Extinction
- 2014 – AHA! Cleveland
- 2013 – Exploratorium
- 2012 – Sheikh Zayed Grand Mosque UAE National Day Celebration
- 2012 – Nike Hyper Elite Platinum Launch
- 2011 – YouTube Sydney Opera House
- 2011 – Coca-Cola 125th Anniversary Celebration
- 2011 – Facebook F8 Connections
- 2010 – YouTube Play Guggenheim Museum

Permanent installations and interactive walls:

- 2016 – Salesforce SF headquarters lobby wall
- 2015 – Shantou University Sports Arena
- 2015 – Bloomberg San Francisco Tech office: Light Volume
- 2015 – Dubai 360 Sphere
- 2015 – UNESCO 70th Celebration Interactive Wall
- 2014 – AT&T/Dallas Stadium's Live FX Board & Immersive Columns
- 2014 – College Football Hall of Fame
- 2014 – Tishman Speyer LUMINA
- 2013 – Diageo Johnnie Walker
- 2013 – America's Cup / Flying on Water
- 2012 – Westfield Illuminique Under the Dome
- 2012 – San Francisco Public Utilities District
- 2011 – Yahoo Bus Stop Derby
