= Blaine DesLauriers =

American politician

Member-elect of the North Dakota House of Representatives from the 3rd district
- Assuming office December 2026
- Succeeding: Jeff Hoverson

Personal details
- Party: Republican

Blaine DesLauriers is an American politician. A member of the Republican Party, he is the member-elect for the 3rd district of the North Dakota House of Representatives.
