= Bob Turner (New York politician) =

American media executive and politician (born 1941)

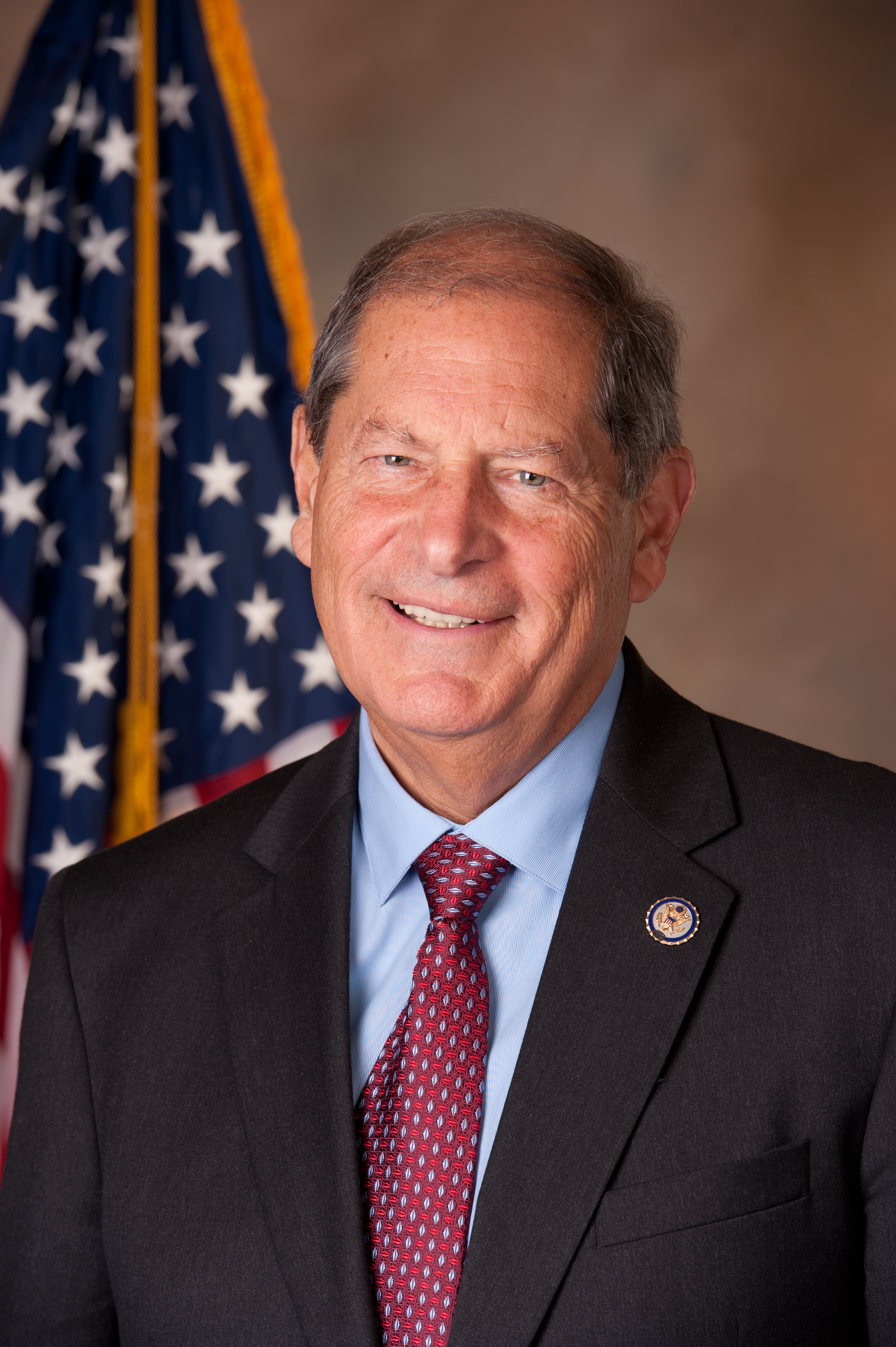
- Official portrait, 2011

Member of the U.S. House of Representatives from New York's 9th district
- In office September 15, 2011 – January 3, 2013
- Preceded by: Anthony Weiner
- Succeeded by: Gregory Meeks (redistricted)

Personal details
- Born: May 2, 1941 (age 85) New York City, New York, U.S.
- Party: Republican
- Spouse: Peggy Turner (m. 1963)
- Children: 5
- Education: St. John's University (BA)

Military service
- Branch/service: United States Army
- Years of service: 1962–1965
- Rank: Specialist 5

Robert L. Turner (born May 2, 1941) is an American businessman and politician who served as the United States representative for New York's 9th congressional district (containing parts of Brooklyn and Queens) from 2011 to 2013. He is a member of the Republican Party.

Turner is a retired media executive known for his success in the television talk show segment of the industry. Six years after retiring from his business career, he entered politics to run against Democratic Rep. Anthony Weiner in November 2010. He lost the race, receiving 39 percent of the vote. Less than one year later, following Weiner's resignation due to a sexting scandal, Turner defeated Democrat David Weprin, 52%–47%, in a special election battle for Weiner's seat; Turner became the first Republican to represent the area since 1923. In 2012, after his congressional district was eliminated in redistricting, Turner ran for the United States Senate but was defeated in the primaries. Turner later served as chairman of the Queens County chapter of the Republican Party from 2015 to 2017.

== Early life and education ==
Born in 1941, Turner grew up in the Woodhaven and Richmond Hill neighborhoods of Queens, the eldest of three sons. His father was a taxi driver and machinist; his mother a homemaker. Turner has described his parents as "New Deal Democrats who began splitting their tickets in the post-Kennedy years." He graduated from Richmond Hill High School and from St. John's University, and he served in the Army from 1962 to 1964. As a college student, Turner took part in the conservative activist group Young Americans for Freedom.

== Business career ==
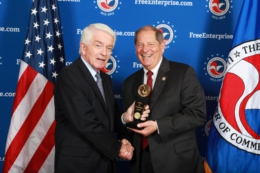
Congressman Turner was awarded the United States Chamber of Commerce “Spirit of Enterprise Award” by U.S. Chamber of Commerce President and CEO Tom J. Donohue for his support of pro-business issues.

Turner worked in the advertising and television industries for more than four decades. In 1984, he co-founded and ran Orbis Communications, a distributor of advertiser funded programming. He then headed the North American operations of Pearson LLC, where he exported the television talk show format to Europe, launching six shows in two years. In addition, Turner reorganized and redirected the successful program Baywatch and launched new versions of the game shows Family Feud and To Tell the Truth.

Turner's most notable position was president of Multimedia Entertainment, a division of media conglomerate Multimedia, Inc., from 1991 to 1995. He created The Jerry Springer Show, he oversaw the production of The Phil Donahue Show and The Sally Jessy Raphael Show, and launched the Rush Limbaugh show on television. Jerry Springer recalled that he and Turner had a friendly, businesslike relationship though their politics differed. Turner shelved several Springer show episodes as inappropriate but kept the show on the air despite heavy criticism and calls from Congress to regulate the show's raunchy content. Limbaugh recalled of Turner: "it was Bob Turner that chased Roger Ailes and me down one night at 21 with the idea of doing a show. He was a great guy. He is a great guy. And he has the perfect temperament(...) and he was as loyal as the day is long." Multimedia Entertainment was sold to Gannett Corporation for $2.1 billion in 1995 with Turner helping to orchestrate the sale. Gannett ended Rush Limbaugh's television show and Turner's 24-hour news talk station, the All-Talk Channel. In 1996, Multimedia Entertainment was sold to MCA/Universal Studios.

He has also been President of LBS Communications, a division of Grey Advertising, where he created a daytime "barter network" for the distribution and syndication of the series Family and Fame. He served as Director of Advertising for Bristol-Myers Company, where he began the production of the Leonard Nimoy series, In Search of..., and was the first General Manager of CBS Cable. During his active business career, Turner founded and served as the president of the Association of Syndicated Television Advertisers and was on the boards of the National Association of Television Programming Executives and the Advertising Research Council. He served on the television committee of the Association of National Advertisers.

While in his early 60s, Turner retired from full-time business activities but continued to manage his own investments including a hotel business in Orlando, Florida. He sat on several Boards of Directors, including Readspeak Inc., Liberty Imaging Inc., the Achilles Track Club and Family Focus Adoption Services.

== 2010 campaign for Congress ==
Turner first ran for Congress in November 2010 against Anthony Weiner in New York's ninth congressional district, losing 60% to 40%. During the 2010 campaign, he ran on a platform favoring minimal regulation of business and signed the Grover Norquist / Americans for Tax Reform pledge of "no new taxes under any circumstances".

== United States Representative (2011–2013) ==
=== 2011 Special election ===
Following the resignation of Anthony Weiner, Turner ran for the vacant seat in a special election held on September 13, 2011—beating his Democratic opponent, David Weprin, by 3,686 votes. His campaign consultant was strategist Bill O'Reilly. Turner's campaign ran ads showing images of the World Trade Center site in flames, accusing Weprin of commemorating the attack by defending the right of Sufi Muslims to build the Islamic community center Park51. Turner also said that Weprin would merely toe the Democratic Party line if elected and emphasized that Weprin had said the national debt was $4 trillion when the correct number was $14 trillion. Turner, according to the New York Times, "aggressively courted observant Jewish voters", and painted Weprin as a puppet of President Obama, who would not stand up for Israel. Turner won strong support from Orthodox Jewish leaders, and won crossover endorsements, two key ones being New York Assemblyman Dov Hikind, and former New York Mayor Ed Koch, both Democrats and Jews.

Turner began the campaign with a disadvantage in fundraising because the national and state Republican parties had spent heavily in previous special elections in New York state. Turner turned down Tea Party support and offers to help during his special election campaign. Regardless, Turner rose in the polls from an underdog to an eight-point advantage days before the election. The Democratic Party contributed heavily to Weprin in the last weeks of the race, as Turner's odds of winning increased. Turner's win was publicized as a large upset victory, and made national headlines because Democrats outnumbered Republicans by 3-to-1 in the district. His win was also unexpected because his district had a large Jewish constituency (up to one quarter of registered voters are Jewish), and Turner beat Weprin, an Orthodox Jew, with a majority of the Jewish vote.

Turner's campaign manager, E. O'Brien Murray, was later named 2012 GOP campaign manager of the year, by the American Association of Political Consultants for his role in the win. The district is Democratic leaning with a Cook Partisan Voting Index (CPVI) of D+5. In Salon, which called Turner's win "unremarkable", it was argued that the district had been leaning rightward, as it was one of the few districts in the nation in which Barack Obama performed one point worse than John Kerry in 2004 and 12 points worse than Al Gore in 2000. However, Salon's claims were questioned by some as Obama had won the district in 2008 by 11 points and Kerry by 12 in 2004, which did not seem to imply a strong conservative swing. Furthermore, the local city council seat was easily won by a Democrat in the most recent election, along with the local State Senate and Assembly seats. This included a special election for New York State Assembly on the same day as Turner's election, within his congressional district, where the Democratic candidate won with 76% of the vote. Additionally, Andrew Cuomo easily won the district during his run for Governor of New York.

=== Federal spending cuts ===
One of Turner's campaign themes was fiscal recovery through cuts in federal spending. He opposed what Democrats said were Republican plans to privatize Medicare and Social Security and turn Medicaid into a block-grant program, reportedly at the request of former New York mayor Ed Koch, who supported him. In endorsing Turner's opponent, The New York Times said that Turner's economic plan to reduce taxes without reducing benefits for current Medicare and Social Security recipients was unrealistic. "That would take a magician, not a businessman", said the Times. One month before the election, Turner admitted that an op-ed he written for the National Review calling for a one third reduction in federal spending and "an end to government dependencies" was "blatant pandering" to "a particular audience".

During his 2011 campaign, Turner stated he came out of retirement to run for Congress "to fix what's broken and go home. End subsidies. End government dependencies. Dramatically cut the budget by 30 or 35 percent. Slash capital-gains taxes down to zero. Cut taxes across the board. The rest of America's economic healing will happen naturally as a consequence", he said. In 2011 he chose not to sign "the pledge," citing the need to compromise in the critical area of reducing the debt. In his 2011 campaign he cited illegal immigration as a major cause of U.S. unemployment. To resolve the U.S. debt, he proposed eliminating the U.S Department of Agriculture and the Environmental Protection Agency and reducing the size of the Department of Education.

=== Tenure ===
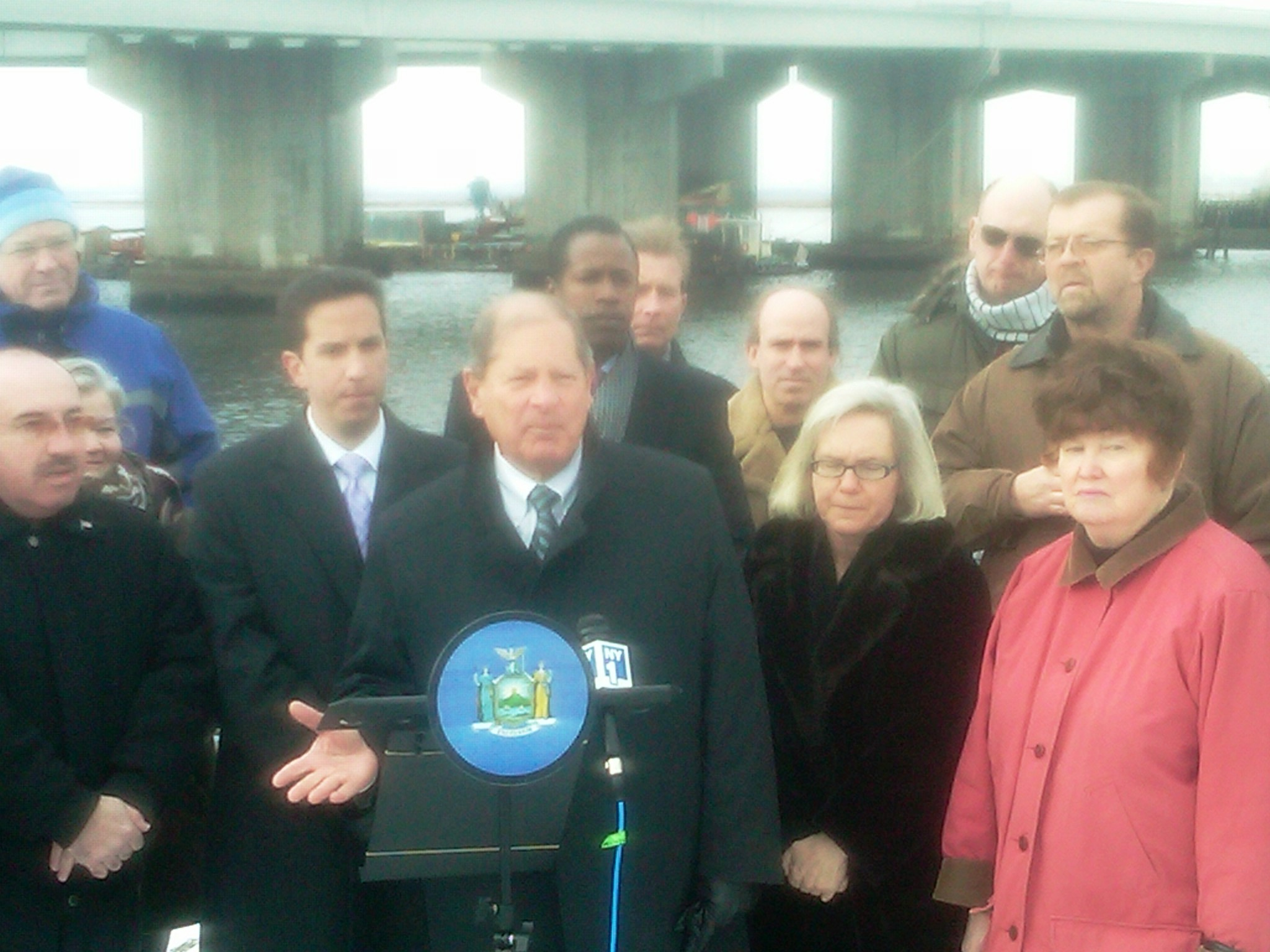
Turner at the Cross Bay Veterans Memorial Bridge, where he argued for the elimination of its tolls

Turner was sworn in on September 15, 2011. He was mentored by Homeland Security Committee chair Peter T. King (R-NY) in his transition to his new job. Turner met with his former rival, Anthony Weiner, discussing open constituent files and issues facing the district, including noise pollution and eroding beaches. He had a cordial and businesslike meeting with Weiner, though the two men have been described as polar opposites.

Within weeks of taking office, Turner was attacked by the Democratic Congressional Campaign Committee (DCCC) for his no new tax pledge, and painted by the DCCC as representing wealthy individuals and corporations rather than the average district voter. Turner expressed support for hydrofracking in upstate New York, and would allow states to opt out of No Child Left Behind. Remarking on the tenth anniversary of the war in Afghanistan, Turner said he would "leave our military commitment in Afghanistan up to the generals in the field," adding that, "If they believe the sacrifice of our soldiers continues to be necessary to prevent attacks on U.S. soil, then we have no choice but to let them finish the task." Turner was an advocate for removing the tolls on the Cross Bay Veterans Memorial Bridge, and applauded Gov. Cuomo for his motions towards changing the policy.

In November 2011, a protester affiliated with the Occupy Wall Street movement shouted during Turner's ceremonial swearing-in. Turner then criticized the OWS demonstrators as socialist and praised America's capitalist system as a "beacon to the world". Turner voted for Paul Ryan's revised budget plan in 2012, despite reluctance that it would privatize Medicare and Social Security. Turner promised during his campaign to protect Social Security, and explicitly said he would vote no to the Ryan plan. Turner's spokesman defended his vote for the bill, saying Turner was opposed to many of its provisions, but believed it was a good starting point for negotiations because it would not be finalized without compromise with the Democratic-controlled Senate. However, Turner did suggest raising the minimum age from 65.

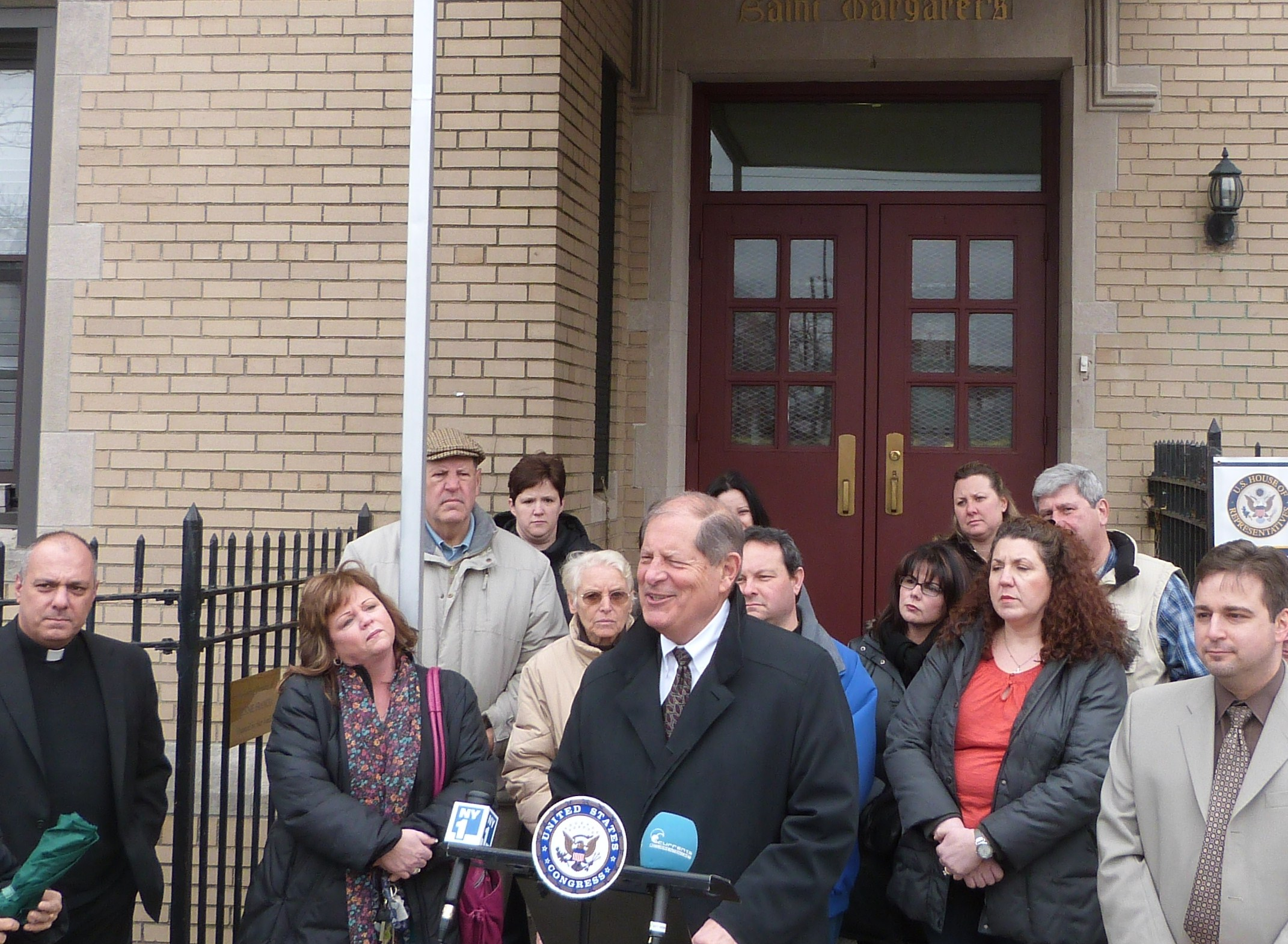
Turner speaking about his proposed Teach Act of 2012, which would give a tax credit up to $5,000 for children in private or parochial schools

Turner introduced The TEACH Act of 2012, which would provide a federal tax credit of up to $5,000 per year to families who send their children to non-public K-12 schools. Congressman Turner has said his goal with the TEACH Act is to ameliorate the “double taxation” burdening on parents paying for local school taxes and private schooling tuition. His proposal received wide support from the Orthodox Union, Yeshiva congregations in Queens, and the Roman Catholic Diocese of Brooklyn. The Act is currently in committee.

=== Committee assignments ===
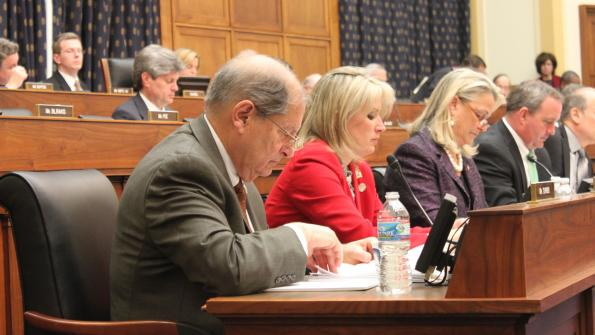
Turner seated at the House Foreign Affairs Committee. On foreign affairs, he supported Israel and voted to restrict the threat of a nuclear Iran

The House Republican Steering Committee assigned Turner to three committees in the House, including Foreign Affairs, Veterans Affairs, and Homeland Security. When asked about the news, Turner said he was "very excited to be appointed to three important House committees." Rep. Peter King commended Turner's involvement in homeland security, saying Turner knew that "New York is the number one target." Turner sided with the NYPD's intelligence gathering of Arab-Americans, and supported more funding for defense. Upon being chosen to serve on the House Committee on Foreign Affairs, he stated, "I intend to forward my beliefs that it is in our national interest to defend our Middle East ally, Israel, and I will oppose further attempts by the U.N. to recognize a Palestinian state." He co-sponsored H.R. Bill 556, which condemned Iran for human rights abuses, and urged Pres. Obama to challenge Iran for its nuclear armament policies Turner pushed for strict economic sanctions on the Iranian Central Bank, and criticized Sen. Harry Reid for stalling H.R. 1905, which would have allowed the U.S. to restrict Iran's trade internationally and bar U.S.-Iran diplomacy.

Brooklyn Daily opined that the assignments would not allow Turner to make use of his business experience and offered little opportunity for him to deliver on his promises of bringing "fiscal sanity" to Washington. His predecessor, Anthony Weiner, had served in the Committee on Energy and Commerce, which had the broadest jurisdiction of the committees.

=== Redistricting ===
Following the 2010 Census, New York State lost two congressmen in its delegation, and Turner's district was split. Crain's New York Business said that Turner's win would make the New York Republican Party more likely to push for a "super Jewish" congressional district, extending the influence of Brooklyn's Orthodox Jewish community. Under the new congressional district lines, he would possibly have faced Gregory Meeks in a more African-American and heavily Democratic constituency; Turner was not optimistic about his chances, telling reporters, "That’s a district that really can’t be moved. That’s not a legitimate shot."

=== 2012 U.S. Senate election ===
In March 2012, he announced he would challenge Democratic incumbent U.S. Senator Kirsten Gillibrand. Turner faced attorney Wendy E. Long and Nassau County Comptroller George Maragos in a primary election to face Gillibrand. The 2012 New York State Republican convention split the endorsement among the three candidates, with enough support for each candidate to automatically appear on the ballot. Turner lost the primary election to Long on June 26, 2012. He additionally sought the endorsement of New York's Conservative Party, which he also lost to Long.

=== Queens County GOP chairmanship ===
On March 12, 2015, Turner was named chairman of the Queens borough Republican Party. He was endorsed for the position by New York state Republican chairman Ed Cox, and voted in unanimously. On September 27, 2017, he was ousted as chairman by Joann Ariola.

== Personal life ==
Turner was married to his wife Peggy Turner, a foster care nurse for special needs children, for 57 years before her death in 2021. The couple had five children and 13 grandchildren and resided in Rockaway Point, Queens.

In August 2011, Turner revealed the couple's 1994 adoption of C.J. Holmstrom, an orphan boy whose parents had died from AIDS. C.J.'s mother, Rosemary Holmstrom, had been on daytime talk shows in the 1980s discussing the death of her husband from AIDS and her own HIV-positive status. The Turners helped her and C.J. from that time on, adopting C.J. after her death.

The Turners' home was flooded and subsequently burned to the ground during Hurricane Sandy.

== Electoral history ==
2012 U.S. Senate Republican primary election State of New York, June 26, 2012
Party	Candidate	Votes	%
Republican	Wendy Long	75,924	50.24
Republican	Bob Turner	54,196	35.86
Republican	George Maragos	21,002	13.90
Majority		21,728	14.38
Turnout		151,122	5.35

2011 U.S. House of Representatives special election New York's 9th District, September 13, 2011
Party	Candidate	Votes	%
Republican	Bob Turner	37,342	52
Democratic	David Weprin	33,656	47
Republican gain from Democratic			

2010 U.S. House of Representatives general election New York's 9th District, November 2, 2010
Party	Candidate	Votes	%
Democratic	Anthony Weiner (incumbent)	67,011	61
Republican	Bob Turner	43,129	39
Democratic hold			

== See also ==
- Media conglomerate
- Tabloid talk show

U.S. House of Representatives
Preceded by Anthony Weiner	Member of the U.S. House of Representatives from New York's 9th congressional district 2011–2013	Succeeded by Yvette Clarke
U.S. order of precedence (ceremonial)
Preceded by Scott Murphy as Former U.S. Representative	Order of precedence of the United States as Former U.S. Representative	Succeeded by Joe Sempolinski as Former U.S. Representative
