= Jeff Hoverson =

American politician

Member of the North Dakota House of Representatives from the 3rd district
- Incumbent
- Assumed office December 1, 2018
- Succeeded by: Blaine DesLauriers (elect)

Personal details
- Party: Republican
- Spouse: JoAnn
- Children: 6
- Occupation: Politician, pastor

Jeff A. Hoverson is an American politician, pastor and businessman who serves as a Republican member of the North Dakota House of Representatives. He represents the 3rd district alongside Bob Paulson.

== Biography ==
Hoverson grew up in Dahlen, North Dakota. He holds a bachelor's degree in education from Valley City State University and a master of divinity from Lutheran Brethren Seminary. He is a former public school teacher and operates a LoVE Ice Cream food truck with his family.

From 2004 until 2010, Hoverson was a pastor at Bread of Life. He has been a pastor at Living Word Lutheran Church since 2010. In March 2018, he announced that he was running for state representative. He and fellow Republic Bob Paulson won the June primary and the November general election. Hoverson took office on December 1, 2018, and serves on the committees on education, government and veterans affairs.

On January 7, 2025, Hoverson and Bill Tveit introduced a resolution to the North Dakota House of Representatives urging the U.S. Supreme Court to overturn Obergefell v. Hodges and define marriage as between a man and a woman. The measure was withdrawn nine days later.

Hoverson is married to JoAnn and they have six children.
