= 2012 United States Senate election in New York =

- November 6, 2012
- Turnout: 53.2% (voting eligible)
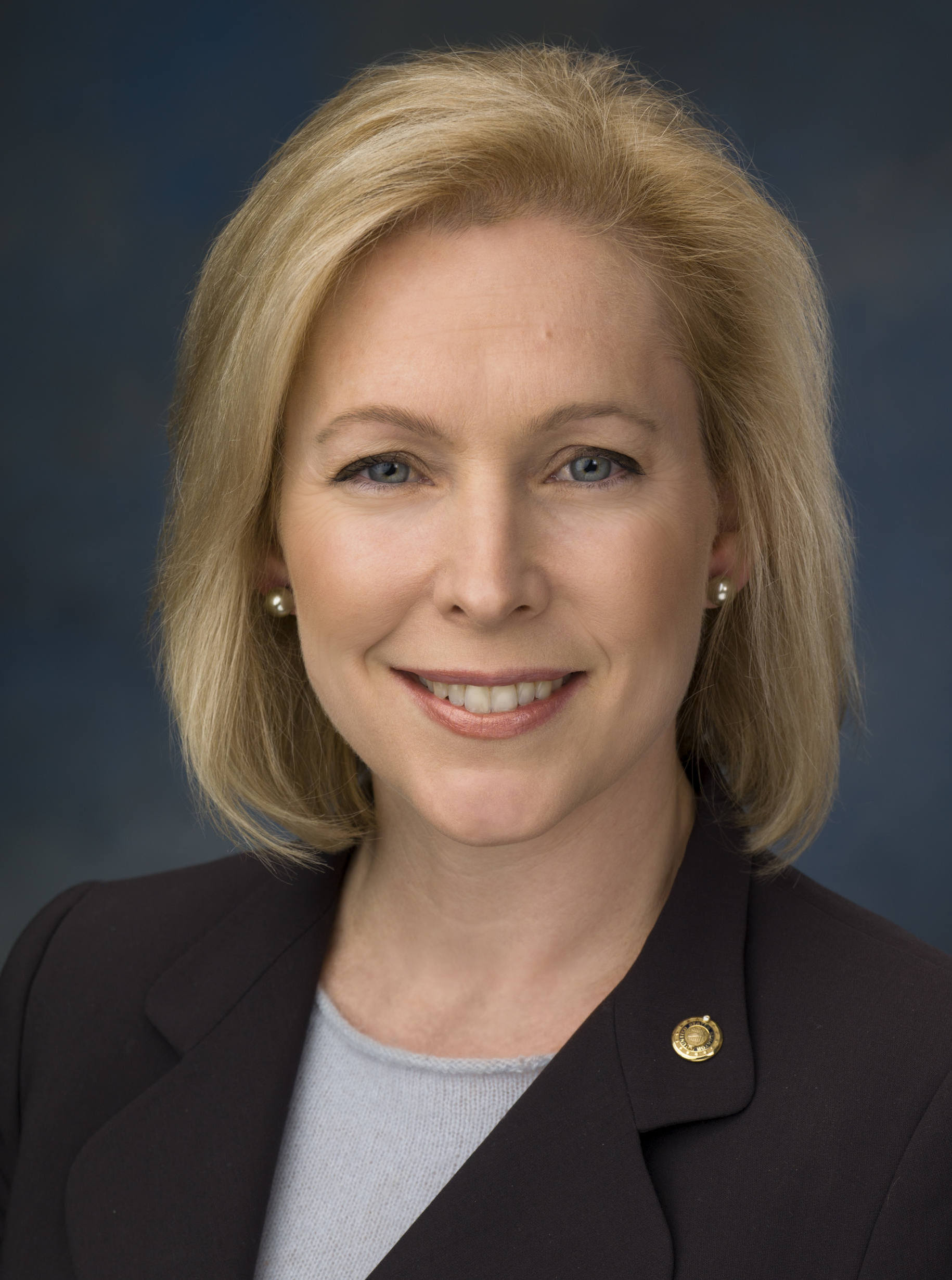

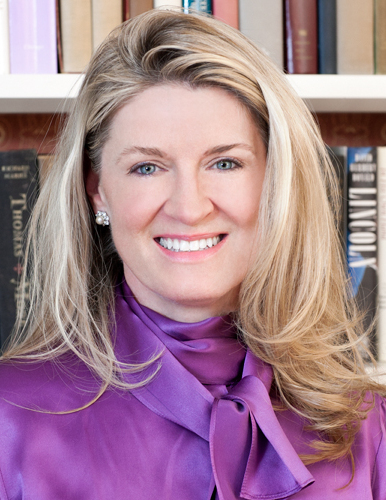
Nominee	Kirsten Gillibrand	Wendy Long
Party	Democratic	Republican
Alliance	Parties: Independence; Working Families	Conservative
Popular vote	4,822,330	1,758,702
Percentage	72.19%	26.33%
- Gillibrand: 40–50% 50–60% 60–70% 70–80% 80–90% >90% Long: 40–50% 50–60%
U.S. senator before election
Kirsten Gillibrand
Democratic
Elected U.S. Senator
Kirsten Gillibrand
Democratic

The 2012 United States Senate election in New York took place on November 6, 2012, concurrently with the U.S. presidential election, other elections to the United States Senate and House of Representatives, and various state and local elections.

Governor David Paterson appointed then-U.S. Representative Kirsten Gillibrand to serve as U.S. senator from New York until the 2010 special election, succeeding former U.S. Senator Hillary Clinton, who resigned to serve as U.S. secretary of state in the Obama administration. Gillibrand won the special election in 2010 with 62.95% of the vote over former U.S. Representative Joseph DioGuardi.

Incumbent Democratic U.S. Senator Kirsten Gillibrand won re-election to her first full term by a landslide. She was opposed in the general election by Wendy Long (who ran on the Republican and Conservative Party tickets) and by three minor party candidates. Gillibrand was re-elected with 72% of the vote. She carried 60 out of 62 counties statewide, losing only Wyoming and Allegany counties.

== Democratic primary ==
=== Candidates ===
- Kirsten Gillibrand, incumbent U.S. senator

Gillibrand was endorsed by the Independence Party of New York and the Working Families Party and appeared on the ballot lines of both of those parties in the general election.

== Republican primary ==
=== Candidates ===
==== Declared ====
- Wendy Long, attorney
- George Maragos, Nassau County comptroller
- Bob Turner, U.S. representative, New York's 9th congressional district

The 2012 New York State Republican Convention took place on March 16, 2012. Candidates Wendy Long, George Maragos, and Congressman Bob Turner each reached the threshold of 25% of the weighted vote necessary to qualify for the June 26 primary ballot; however, none of the candidates achieved a majority. Long prevailed by a sizeable margin in the June 26 Republican primary, receiving 50.9% of the vote; Turner received 35.6% and Maragos 13.5%.

Long was designated as the nominee for the Conservative Party of New York State, and appeared on its ballot line in the general election as well as the Republican Party line.

==== Withdrew ====
- Joe Carvin, Rye Town supervisor, withdrew on March 16, 2012 to run for the House of Representatives against Nita Lowey.

=== Polling ===
Poll source	Date(s) administered	Sample size	Margin of error	Wendy Long	George Maragos	Bob Turner	Other	Undecided
Quinnipiac	March 28 – April 2, 2012	372	±5.1%	11%	7%	19%	2%	61%
Siena College	April 1–4, 2012	218	±6.6%	10%	5%	19%	—	66%
Siena College	May 6–10, 2012	205	±6.8%	12%	6%	15%	—	67%
Siena College	June 3–6, 2012	201	±6.9%	11%	3%	16%	—	70%

=== Endorsements ===
Wendy Long

Individuals

- John Bolton, former US ambassador to the United Nations
- John Faso, 2006 gubernatorial candidate
- Steve Forbes, publisher and former presidential candidate
- Sean Hannity, talk radio/television host
- Laura Ingraham, talk radio host
- Brian Kolb, state assembly minority leader
- Rick Lazio, former US congressman from New York
- Grover Norquist
- Carl Paladino, 2010 gubernatorial candidate
- Dennis Vacco, former New York State attorney general

Organizations

- National Organization for Marriage

Newspapers

- The New York Post
Bob Turner
- Rudy Giuliani, former mayor of New York City, 2008 presidential candidate, and Time Person of the Year for 2001
- Martin Golden, New York state senator from the 22nd District
- Rush Limbaugh, talk radio host

Source: Update for US Senate Election NY 2012

=== Results ===
Results by county: Long: 40–50%; 50–60%; 60–70%; 70–80%; 80–90%; Turner: 40–50%; 50–60%; 60–70%; 70–80%; Maragos: 40–50%

Republican primary results
Party	Candidate	Votes	%
Republican	Wendy Long	75,924	50.2%
Republican	Bob Turner	54,196	35.9%
Republican	George Maragos	21,002	13.9%
Total votes		151,122	100.0%

== General election ==
=== Candidates ===
- Colia Clark (Green), civil rights activist and candidate for the U.S. Senate in 2010
- Chris Edes (Libertarian)
- Kirsten Gillibrand (Democratic, Working Families, Independence), incumbent U.S. senator
- Wendy Long (Republican, Conservative), attorney
- John Mangelli (Common Sense Party)

=== Debates ===
- Complete video of debate, October 17, 2012 - C-SPAN

=== Fundraising ===
Candidate (party)	Receipts	Disbursements	Cash on hand	Debt
Kirsten Gillibrand (D)	$13,778,867	$3,734,097	$10,541,156	$0
Wendy Long (R)	$336,976	$240,564	$96,411	$250,077
Chris Edes (L)	$2,017	$668	$1,348	$0
John Mangelli (I)	$43,819	$43,820	$0	$22,120
Source: Federal Election Commission

==== Top contributors ====
Kirsten Gillibrand	Contribution	Wendy Long	Contribution
Boies, Schiller & Flexner	$394,664	Citizens United	$10,000
Davis Polk & Wardwell	$314,600	Susan B. Anthony List	$10,000
Corning Inc.	$150,650	Davis, Polk & Wardwell	$8,500
JPMorgan Chase & Co	$143,800	Kirkland & Ellis	$7,000
Morgan Stanley	$140,800	Wachtell, Lipton, Rosen & Katz	$6,000
National Amusements Inc.	$126,850	Alta Partners	$5,500
Goldman Sachs	$117,400	Actimize	$5,000
Blackstone Group	$106,700	Carlyle Group	$5,000
Sullivan & Cromwell	$100,750	Credit Suisse Group	$5,000
Simpson, Thacher & Bartlett	$95,700	Crow Holdings	$5,000

==== Top industries ====
Kirsten Gillibrand	Contribution	Wendy Long	Contribution
Lawyers/law firms	$4,050,294	Lawyers/law firms	$38,550
Financial institutions	$2,748,640	Financial institutions	$31,750
Real estate	$1,257,504	Real estate	$26,250
Retired	$921,738	Retired	$25,050
Women's issues	$853,517	Misc. finance	$16,000
Entertainment industry	$764,677	Women's issues	$15,150
Lobbyists	$723,596	Republican/Conservative	$11,250
Misc. finance	$644,953	Education	$7,250
Business services	$621,286	Misc. business	$7,000
Insurance	$518,275	Construction services	$5,000

=== Predictions ===
Source	Ranking	As of
The Cook Political Report	Solid D	November 1, 2012
Sabato's Crystal Ball	Safe D	November 5, 2012
Rothenberg Political Report	Safe D	November 2, 2012
Real Clear Politics	Safe D	November 5, 2012

=== Polling ===
Poll source	Date(s) administered	Sample size	Margin of error	Kirsten Gillibrand (D)	Wendy Long (R)	Other	Undecided
Quinnipiac	March 28 – April 2, 2012	1,597	±2.5%	58%	25%	1%	13%
Siena College	April 1–4, 2012	808	±3.4%	63%	23%	—	14%
Siena College	May 6–10, 2012	766	±3.5%	60%	26%	—	14%
Quinnipiac	May 22–28, 2012	1,504	±2.5%	58%	24%	1%	15%
Siena College	June 3–6, 2012	807	±3.4%	65%	22%	—	12%
Siena College	July 10–15, 2012	758	±3.6%	62%	25%	—	13%
Quinnipiac	July 17–23, 2012	1,779	±2.3%	57%	24%	1%	16%
Siena College	August 14–19, 2012	671	±3.8%	65%	22%	—	13%
Quinnipiac	September 4–9, 2012	1,468	±2.5%	64%	27%	—	9%
Marist	October 18–21, 2012	565	±4.1%	68%	24%	—	8%
Siena College	October 22–24, 2012	750	±3.6%	67%	24%	—	8%
SurveyUSA	October 23–25, 2012	554	±4.1%	64%	22%	7%	7%

Hypothetical polling

with George Maragos

Poll source	Date(s) administered	Sample size	Margin of error	Kirsten Gillibrand (D)	George Maragos (R)	Other	Undecided
Siena College	November 8–13, 2011	803	±3.5%	65%	17%	—	18%
Siena College	January 8–12, 2012	805	±3.5%	63%	22%	—	15%
Siena College	January 29 – February 1, 2012	807	±3.4%	63%	20%	—	17%
SurveyUSA	February 24–26, 2012	518	±4.4%	53%	23%	—	25%
Siena College	February 26–29, 2012	808	±3.4%	68%	19%	—	13%
Quinnipiac	March 28 – April 2, 2012	1,597	±2.5%	57%	23%	2%	15%
Siena College	April 1–4, 2012	808	±3.4%	65%	21%	—	14%
Siena College	May 6–10, 2012	766	±3.5%	60%	25%	—	15%
Quinnipiac	May 22–28, 2012	1,504	±2.5%	57%	24%	1%	16%
Siena College	June 3–6, 2012	807	±3.4%	65%	23%	—	13%

with Bob Turner

Poll source	Date(s) administered	Sample size	Margin of error	Kirsten Gillibrand (D)	Bob Turner (R)	Other	Undecided
Quinnipiac	March 28 – April 2, 2012	1,597	±2.5%	57%	27%	1%	13%
Siena College	April 1–4, 2012	808	±3.4%	65%	24%	—	11%
Siena College	May 6–10, 2012	766	±3.5%	59%	25%	—	15%
Quinnipiac	May 22–28, 2012	1,504	±2.5%	56%	26%	0%	15%
Siena College	June 3–6, 2012	807	±3.4%	63%	25%	—	11%

with Marc Cenedella

Poll source	Date(s) administered	Sample size	Margin of error	Kirsten Gillibrand (D)	Marc Cenedella (R)	Undecided
Siena College	January 29 – February 1, 2012	807	±3.4%	65%	18%	17%

with Harry Wilson

Poll source	Date(s) administered	Sample size	Margin of error	Kirsten Gillibrand (D)	Harry Wilson (R)	Undecided
Siena College	November 8–13, 2011	803	±3.5%	63%	21%	16%
Siena College	January 8–12, 2012	805	±3.5%	63%	23%	14%

=== Results ===

2012 United States Senate election in New York
Party	Candidate	Votes	%	±%
Democratic	Kirsten Gillibrand	4,432,525	66.36%	+11.37%
Working Families	Kirsten Gillibrand	251,292	3.76%	−0.29%
Independence	Kirsten Gillibrand	138,513	2.07%	−1.83%
Total	Kirsten Gillibrand (incumbent)	4,822,330	72.19%	+9.25%
Republican	Wendy Long	1,517,578	22.72%	−6.96%
Conservative	Wendy Long	241,124	3.61%	−1.81%
Total	Wendy Long	1,758,702	26.33%	−8.77%
Green	Colia Clark	42,591	0.64%	−0.15%
Libertarian	Chris Edes	32,002	0.48%	+0.07%
Independent	John Mangelli	22,041	0.33%	N/A
Write ins	Write ins	2,012	0.03%	+0.00
Total votes		6,679,678	100.00%	N/A
Democratic hold				

==== Results by county ====
County	Kirsten Gillibrand Democratic		Wendy Long Republican		Various candidates		Margin		Total votes cast
County	#	%	#	%	#	%	#	%	Total votes cast
Albany	98,432	75.1%	30,317	23.1%	2,297	1.7%	68,115	52.0%	131,046
Allegany	7,635	47.5%	8,151	50.8%	275	1.7%	−516	−3.3%	16,061
Bronx	321,378	93.1%	21,618	6.3%	2,231	0.7%	299,760	86.8%	345,227
Broome	49,814	64.4%	26,166	33.8%	1,375	1.7%	23,648	30.6%	77,355
Cattaraugus	15,654	55.5%	12,058	42.8%	482	1.6%	3,596	12.7%	28,194
Cayuga	18,067	62.0%	10,265	35.3%	788	2.8%	7,802	26.7%	29,120
Chautauqua	29,001	57.2%	20,869	41.2%	824	1.6%	8,132	16.0%	50,694
Chemung	20,682	61.8%	12,345	36.9%	449	1.3%	8,337	24.9%	33,476
Chenango	10,672	58.9%	6,956	38.4%	483	2.7%	3,716	20.5%	18,111
Clinton	19,439	68.5%	8,373	29.5%	554	2.0%	11,066	39.0%	28,366
Columbia	19,905	69.9%	8,154	28.6%	476	1.5%	11,751	41.3%	28,490
Cortland	11,166	60.7%	6,730	36.6%	514	2.8%	4,436	24.1%	18,410
Delaware	11,172	61.8%	6,606	36.6%	288	1.6%	4,566	25.2%	18,066
Dutchess	77,809	65.8%	38,607	32.6%	1,840	1.5%	39,202	33.2%	118,256
Erie	265,264	68.1%	117,861	30.3%	6,453	1.6%	147,403	37.8%	389,578
Essex	10,094	64.9%	5,201	33.4%	259	1.7%	4,893	31.5%	15,554
Franklin	9,960	66.8%	4,708	31.6%	243	1.7%	5,252	35.2%	14,911
Fulton	11,122	59.2%	7,401	39.4%	260	1.4%	3,721	19.8%	18,783
Genesee	11,845	51.4%	10,745	46.6%	458	1.9%	1,110	4.8%	23,048
Greene	12,098	60.6%	7,544	37.8%	314	1.7%	4,554	22.8%	19,956
Hamilton	1,487	50.0%	1,449	48.7%	39	1.3%	38	1.3%	2,975
Herkimer	14,655	62.4%	8,421	35.9%	405	1.8%	6,234	26.5%	23,481
Jefferson	21,746	63.7%	11,882	34.8%	509	1.5%	9,864	28.9%	34,137
Kings	598,834	87.1%	79,504	11.6%	9,249	1.3%	519,330	75.5%	687,587
Lewis	5,886	60.7%	3,662	37.8%	149	1.6%	2,224	22.9%	9,697
Livingston	13,462	54.3%	10,910	44.0%	442	1.7%	2,552	10.3%	24,814
Madison	15,732	59.2%	10,101	38.0%	755	2.9%	5,631	21.2%	26,588
Monroe	209,781	66.2%	101,323	32.0%	5,644	1.8%	108,458	34.2%	316,748
Montgomery	10,957	63.8%	5,938	34.6%	291	1.8%	5,019	29.2%	17,186
Nassau	342,644	63.8%	188,430	35.1%	5,584	1.1%	154,214	28.7%	536,658
New York	487,701	86.8%	65,699	11.7%	8,236	1.5%	422,002	75.1%	561,636
Niagara	51,592	61.6%	30,645	36.6%	1,491	1.8%	20,947	25.0%	83,728
Oneida	50,715	62.2%	29,059	35.6%	1,812	2.3%	21,656	26.6%	81,586
Onondaga	133,892	68.3%	56,997	29.1%	5,276	2.7%	76,895	39.2%	196,165
Ontario	25,987	56.8%	18,838	41.2%	901	2.0%	7,149	15.6%	45,726
Orange	88,689	65.3%	45,128	33.2%	2,026	1.5%	43,561	32.1%	135,843
Orleans	6,884	50.1%	6,556	47.7%	299	2.1%	328	2.4%	13,739
Oswego	25,117	60.2%	15,404	36.9%	1,182	2.9%	9,713	23.3%	41,703
Otsego	15,114	65.0%	7,767	33.4%	378	1.6%	7,347	31.6%	23,259
Putnam	24,310	58.7%	16,549	39.9%	582	1.4%	7,761	18.8%	41,441
Queens	468,079	84.1%	82,169	14.8%	6,651	1.1%	385,910	69.3%	556,899
Rensselaer	45,767	69.3%	19,310	29.2%	996	1.6%	26,457	40.1%	66,073
Richmond	94,843	63.9%	51,782	34.9%	1,691	1.1%	43,061	29.0%	148,316
Rockland	77,915	66.5%	37,955	32.4%	1,350	1.1%	39,960	34.1%	117,220
St. Lawrence	24,157	69.4%	10,092	29.0%	569	1.6%	14,065	40.4%	34,818
Saratoga	66,459	64.8%	34,728	33.8%	1,439	1.4%	31,731	31.0%	102,626
Schenectady	43,030	68.9%	18,273	29.3%	1,159	1.8%	24,757	39.6%	62,462
Schoharie	7,541	58.9%	5,048	39.4%	213	1.7%	2,493	19.5%	12,802
Schuyler	4,456	57.6%	3,107	40.2%	171	2.3%	1,349	17.4%	7,734
Seneca	7,345	59.0%	4,815	38.7%	284	2.3%	2,530	20.3%	12,444
Steuben	20,044	54.3%	16,240	44.0%	598	1.6%	3,804	10.3%	36,882
Suffolk	354,929	63.3%	198,683	35.4%	7,128	1.3%	156,246	27.9%	560,740
Sullivan	17,427	65.9%	8,551	32.4%	454	1.8%	8,876	33.5%	26,432
Tioga	11,206	54.3%	8,995	43.6%	423	2.0%	2,211	10.7%	20,654
Tompkins	27,764	73.0%	9,059	23.8%	1,211	3.2%	18,705	49.2%	38,034
Ulster	54,455	70.7%	29,908	27.1%	1,653	2.2%	33,547	43.6%	77,016
Warren	19,347	67.1%	9,095	31.6%	370	1.3%	10,252	35.5%	28,812
Washington	15,228	67.3%	7,067	31.2%	321	1.4%	8,161	36.1%	22,616
Wayne	18,974	53.1%	15,973	44.7%	783	2.1%	3,001	8.4%	35,730
Westchester	254,723	70.8%	100,279	27.9%	4,650	1.3%	154,444	42.9%	359,652
Wyoming	7,475	48.8%	7,556	49.3%	283	1.9%	−81	−0.5%	15,314
Yates	4,772	52.8%	4,080	45.2%	181	2.0%	692	7.6%	9,033
Totals	4,511,045	72.19%	1,700,640	26.33%	93,205	1.48%	2,810,405	45.86%	6,679,678

Counties that flipped from Republican to Democratic

- Genesee (largest municipality: Batavia)
- Hamilton (largest municipality: Long Lake)
- Putnam (largest municipality: Lake Carmel)
- Tioga (largest municipality: Waverly)
- Orleans (largest municipality: Albion)
- Wayne (largest municipality: Newark)

==== By congressional district ====
Gillibrand won all 27 congressional districts, including six held by Republicans. She won all but two with over 60% of the vote, with the 27th being her weakest, with only 55% of the vote.

District	Gillibrand	Long	Representative
1st	62.13%	36.58%	Tim Bishop
2nd	63.33%	35.51%	Peter T. King
3rd	62.51%	36.28%	Steve Israel
4th	66.17%	32.88%	Carolyn McCarthy
5th	92.32%	7.21%	Gregory Meeks
6th	75.99%	22.58%	Grace Meng
7th	90.67%	7.65%	Nydia Velázquez
8th	91.75%	7.35%	Hakeem Jeffries
9th	89.59%	9.33%	Yvette Clarke
10th	81.28%	17.15%	Jerry Nadler
11th	64.5%	34.23%	Michael Grimm
12th	81.74%	16.49%	Carolyn Maloney
13th	95.05%	3.91%	Charles B. Rangel
14th	84.85%	13.76%	Joe Crowley
15th	96.89%	2.7%	Jose Serrano
16th	79.78%	19.23%	Eliot Engel
17th	68.41%	30.33%	Nita Lowey
18th	64.33%	34.22%	Sean Patrick Maloney
19th	65.98%	32.34%	Chris Gibson
20th	71.07%	27.26%	Paul Tonko
21st	65.41%	33.1%	Bill Owens
22nd	61.77%	36.05%	Richard L. Hanna
23rd	58.95%	39.13%	Tom Reed
24th	65.34%	32.06%	Dan Maffei
25th	66.81%	31.45%	Louise Slaughter
26th	73.31%	24.99%	Brian Higgins
27th	55.55%	42.71%	Chris Collins

== See also ==
- 2012 United States Senate elections
- 2012 United States House of Representatives elections in New York
- 2012 New York state elections
