= Wendy Long =

American attorney from New York (born 1960)

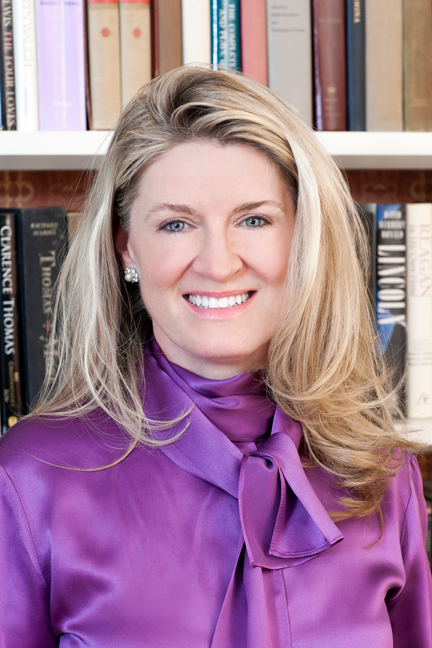
- Long in 2012
- Born: Wendy Elizabeth Stone; June 21, 1960 (age 66); Worcester, Massachusetts, U.S.
- Education: Dartmouth College (BA); Northwestern University (JD)
- Political party: Republican
- Spouse: Arthur Long (m. 1998)

Wendy Elizabeth Long (née Stone; born June 21, 1960) is an American attorney from New Hampshire. A member of the Republican Party, Long was the Republican and Conservative parties’ nominee for U.S. Senate in New York in 2012 and 2016, losing in landslides to incumbent Democrats Kirsten Gillibrand and Chuck Schumer, respectively. She was a delegate to the Republican National Convention in support of Donald Trump in 2016.

Long, a former resident of New York City, has since moved back to her home in southwestern New Hampshire.

== Early life and education ==
Wendy Elizabeth Stone was born on June 21, 1960, in Worcester, Massachusetts, to Donald W. Stone and Norma Swahnberg Stone. The family shortly thereafter returned to their native Keene, New Hampshire. Stone’s father was a small business entrepreneur who pioneered using recycled paper to make greeting cards in his printing company and owned a construction business that built homes in Keene. Her mother, a former elementary school teacher, served as a Selectman in Ward 5 in Keene. Her maternal grandfather, Gunnar Swahnberg, emigrated from Sweden as a child, got an entry-level job as an engineer and became the president of Kingsbury Machine Tool Corporation in Keene.

Long, the oldest of four children, grew up in Keene and graduated from Symonds School, Keene Junior High School, and Keene High School.

Long and all of her three younger siblings are graduates of Dartmouth College in Hanover, New Hampshire. Long was the executive editor of The Dartmouth daily newspaper and was a contributor to The Dartmouth Review newspaper. In 1987, Long was a Publius Fellow at the Claremont Institute. Long graduated from Northwestern University School of Law in 1995, where she had served as an editor of the Northwestern University Law Review. During her third year, Long studied at Harvard Law School.

== Legal career ==
After college, Long returned home to Keene to work with her father. She then served as press secretary to New Hampshire U.S. Senator Gordon J. Humphrey from 1986 to 1987. She then went on to serve as press secretary for U.S. Senator William L. Armstrong from 1987 to 1990. Both Senators retired after two terms, declining to seek a third. Long supports term limits for members of Congress. Before entering law school, Long worked for Americans United for Life, a law firm that authored legislative and litigation strategy for the anti-abortion movement.

From 1995 to 1996, Long served as a law clerk for Judge Ralph K. Winter on the U.S. Court of Appeals for the Second Circuit in New York. From 1997 to 1998, she clerked for Justice Clarence Thomas on the U.S. Supreme Court. She was an associate in the Washington, D.C. office of Kirkland & Ellis between her clerkships and joined the New York office of Kirkland & Ellis when she married and moved to New York City, becoming a litigation partner there.

In 2005, Long helped to found the Judicial Confirmation Network (now known as the Judicial Crisis Network), where she served as chief counsel and promoted judicial restraint through media and public speaking. She participated in discussion and debate on U.S. Circuit Court and U.S. Supreme Court nominations and led both public support and opposition to various judicial nominees., She wrote and spoke in support of President George W. Bush’s nomination of Chief Justice John Roberts and Justice Samuel Alito, but withdrew support for the nomination of Harriet Miers. She also played a prominent role in opposing the Supreme Court nomination of Justice Sonia Sotomayor. In 2007, Long became a legal advisor to Mitt Romney's presidential campaign.

Following the 2020 presidential election, in a private email group communication among former clerks to Justice Thomas, Long expressed support for the disproven conspiracy theory that the election was “stolen” from Trump, stating that she and others "believe in our hearts [that it] was likely a stolen election," and that "President Trump would be determined to be the legitimate winner." The email was leaked by an unknown source and published in The Washington Post.

== Political campaigns ==
=== 2012 U.S. Senate campaign ===
In 2012, Long challenged Democratic Senator Kirsten Gillibrand in the November 6, 2012 general election for United States Senate. On March 16, 2012, Long received 47% of the New York State Republican convention vote, with Nassau County Comptroller George Maragos receiving 27% and Congressman Bob Turner receiving 25%; all three candidates attained access to the ballot for the Republican primary. Long prevailed by a sizable margin in the June 26 Republican primary, receiving 50.9% of the vote; Turner received 35.6% of the vote and Maragos 13.5%. Long was designated as the nominee for the Conservative Party of New York State, having received 91% percent of the delegate vote at the Conservative Party's state convention; thus, Long appeared on both the Republican and Conservative lines in the November 6 general election.

Long lost the general election for United States Senate to Kirsten Gillibrand by 3,063,628 votes.

Long's supporter and college friend from Dartmouth, Dinesh D'Souza, pleaded guilty and was sentenced in 2014 for violating the federal campaign election law by making illegal contributions to Long's 2012 Senate campaign in the names of others.

=== 2016 U.S. Senate campaign ===
In March 2016, Long announced a challenge to Chuck Schumer for his seat in the U.S. Senate. She launched her campaign on March 3 and lost the election on November 8 by 3,212,587 votes.

Long endorsed Donald Trump in the 2016 United States presidential election, although she received no endorsement in return. She cited mosques in Syracuse, New York as the reason for increased crime.

== Personal life ==
In 1998, Long married Arthur S. Long, now a partner at the law firm Gibson Dunn, in Keene, New Hampshire. Following their marriage, they lived in New York City, where they raised their two children.

Long was baptized in the First Congregational Church in Keene, New Hampshire. She was raised a Protestant and became an evangelical Presbyterian while working in the U.S. Senate. While attending Harvard Law School, she converted to Catholicism in Boston. Long has served as a catechism teacher in several Catholic parishes, private catechism groups, and a homeschool co-op. In early 2022, Long returned to New Hampshire and became a member of the Parish of the Holy Spirit of Southwestern New Hampshire.

== Works ==
- Long, Wendy E. (April 20, 2012). "Financial Regulation is Hurting New York". New York City: The Wall Street Journal.
- Long, Wendy E. (September 5, 2005). "With His Boots On". New York City: National Review.
- Long, Wendy E. (June 23, 2008). "Bearing Witness". Claremont Review of Books. Claremont, California: The Claremont Institute. Archived from the original on June 27, 2008.
- Long, Wendy E. (October 10, 2008). "President's choice: An activist Supreme Court". The Washington Times.
- Long, Wendy E. (November 26, 2008). "The Law on Terror". The American Spectator. New York City: Al Regnery.
- Long, Wendy E. (February 10, 2009). "Obama's legal extremists: Today, the Senate vets pro-porn Obama appointee". The Washington Times.

== See also ==
- List of law clerks for the tenth seat of the Supreme Court of the United States

Party political offices
Preceded by Joseph DioGuardi	Republican nominee for U.S. Senator from New York (Class 1); 2012	Succeeded by Chele Farley
Preceded by Jay Townsend	Republican nominee for U.S. Senator from New York (Class 3); 2016	Succeeded by Joe Pinion
