= Roscoe Streyle =

American politician

Member of the North Dakota House of Representatives from the 3rd district
- In office 2011–2018
- Preceded by: Kari Conrad; Lisa Wolf
- Succeeded by: Jeff A. Hoverson; Bob Paulson

Personal details
- Party: Republican
- Spouse: Krisi
- Children: 2
- Profession: Banker

Roscoe Streyle is a Republican politician who represented North Dakota's 3rd district in the North Dakota House of Representatives from 2011 to 2018. Streyle is a banker from Minot. He did not run for reelection in the 2018 election.

In January 2018, Streyle angered disability advocates by using the epithet libtard to describe a fellow Twitter user.

Streyle is married with two children.
