= George Maragos =

American politician

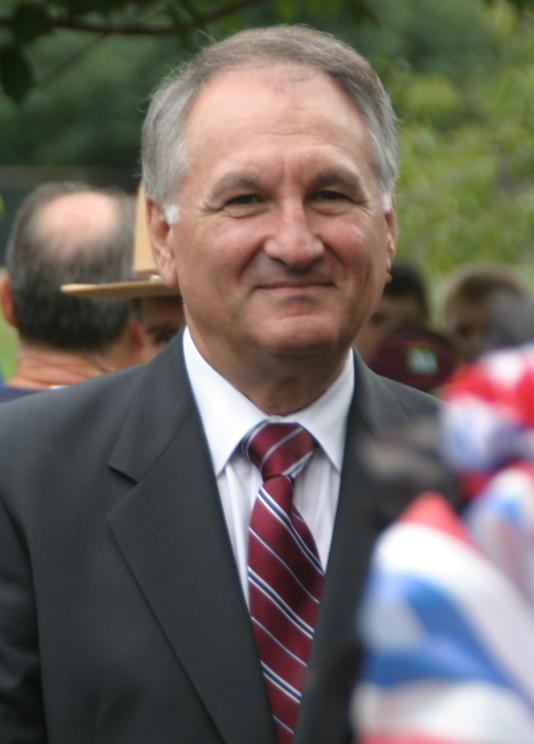
- George Maragos attends a wreath laying ceremony on the 10th anniversary of the September 11th attacks.

13th comptroller of Nassau County
- In office January 2010 – January 2018
- Preceded by: Howard Weitzman
- Succeeded by: Jack Schnirman

Personal details
- Born: March 17, 1949 (age 77) Lefkas, Greece
- Party: Republican (until 2016); Democratic (2016–present)
- Spouse: Angela Maragos (m. 1973)
- Children: 2
- Education: McGill University (BE); Pace University (MBA)

George Maragos (born March 17, 1949) is an American politician who served as the 13th comptroller of Nassau County, New York, USA. He was first elected in 2009 for a four-year term and was re-elected in 2013 for a second four-year term.

== Early life and education ==
George Maragos was born in Lefkas, Greece. His family immigrated in 1958 to Montreal when he was nine years old. As an undergraduate, he studied electrical engineering at McGill University in Montreal, Quebec, Canada, earning a Bachelor of Engineering in electrical engineering in 1973. He immigrated to New York City in 1978 and became a naturalized citizen of the United States in 1985.

Maragos received a Master of Business Administration in finance in 1983 from Pace University in New York City.

== Early career ==
Maragos started his career at Bell-Northern Research where he was one of the youngest managers in the global technology organization. In 1978, he joined Booz Allen Hamilton in New York to work on U.S. Military Defense Command and Control Systems, requiring security clearances from the U.S. government. He later became an associate in charge of developing information technology solutions for major multi-national commercial clients.

In 1981, he joined Chase Manhattan Bank, leading a team charged with building the organization's international data and money transfer network. He was later promoted to vice president. In 1986, he joined Citibank as vice president and director of North American Treasury and Telecommunications Systems.

In 1989, Maragos founded his own business, SDS Financial Technologies, and was its president and CEO for over 20 years until his election as Nassau County Comptroller in 2009.

== Nassau County comptroller ==
Maragos was elected as Nassau County comptroller in November 2009, and was sworn in in January 2010. He was re-elected to a second term beginning in January 2014. The comptroller and his staff oversee the county's budget and financial operations; in 2017, the annual budget was $2.6 billion. The comptroller's office audits government agencies, reviews all county contracts and claims and reports on all matters that significantly affect Nassau County's financial health and operations. The office is also in charge of administering the county payroll and employee health benefits, and preparing Nassau County's Comprehensive Annual Financial Report. In general, Maragos and his staff "work with the administration and legislature to help Nassau County overcome its fiscal challenges".

=== Police overtime report ===
Maragos released an audit of the Nassau County Police Department which revealed $96.28 million in higher-than-budgeted overtime costs and $382.27 million in savings from attrition from 2009 to 2014. These figures were compounded on $247.58 million in estimated future savings as a result of the new collective bargaining agreement. Maragos gave credit to the Nassau County Police for keeping crime low and protecting Nassau County residents but also proposed that the police department's management practices needed to be revised so that more resources could be directed to improve public safety.

=== Economic vision ===
Maragos released a study in 2014 into the changing demographics of Nassau County. The study proposed a new economic vision for the county which, if implemented, it was claimed would revitalize the economy by drawing on the county's natural advantages to become the health and wellness center of the world. Maragos proposed that Nassau County should become a place where people would "want to come to receive the best medical treatments and where the next generation of miracle medicines would be discovered". He urged greater focused investments in innovation, research and development, transportation infrastructure and IT to achieve this economic vision.

=== Verizon audit ===
At the request of the Nassau County Police Department, the Nassau County Comptroller's Office conducted an audit which revealed that Verizon underpaid the county over $466,919, an amount that may have increased as investigations continued. From 2001 to 2014, Verizon implemented an Enhanced 911 system throughout Nassau County. During this time, Verizon deducted 1-3% beyond the permitted administrative fee from residents' monthly phone bills. The comptroller's office recommended a collaboration with the offices of the Nassau County Police to obtain the total unpaid amount from Verizon while the police department reviewed the previous months that Verizon was working with Nassau County on the E911 system to determine whether or not there was even more withheld during that time.

=== Town of Hempstead IDA audit ===
In a letter dated December 4, 2014, the Hempstead Industrial Development Agency ("IDA") proposed a Payment In Lieu Of Taxes ("PILOT") which was described to assist with the purchase of 71.87 acres of land and improvements to the Green Acres Commons (formerly known as the Green Acres Mall). It was not until December 12, 2014, that a cost-benefit analysis for the project was released. The approval of the IDA's PILOT on December 17, 2014, directly contributed to a rise in school property taxes from 4.6% to 12.2% while reducing the taxes paid by the Green Acre Commons by $2.7 million. Maragos review of the documents concerned the PILOTs' unusually expedited process of approval, as well as the PILOT's four-page cost-benefit analysis which contained only calculation tables without any explanations. On October 24, 2016, the Nassau County Comptroller's Office commenced a formal audit of the Town of Hempstead IDA regarding the PILOT granted to the Green Acres Mall.

=== GEB living wage audit ===
Maragos conducted and released an audit of a county contract totaling $385,478 in order to monitor the removal of debris caused by Superstorm Sandy. The contract was performed by Gibbons, Esposito and Boyce (GEB), an engineering firm based in Uniondale, New York. Eight field monitors, who constituted 50% of the employees who were working on the debris removal monitoring project, were underpaid. According to the audit, GEB failed to provide proof that all of its field monitors had the proper FEMA protocol training which was a minimum requirement stated in the contract. Paid time off was not awarded, which is contrary to Living Wave Law. Various time sheets that GEB submitted to the county for reimbursement did not contain the appropriate signatures for approval. GEB and its legal counsel maintained that they were exempt from the county's Living Wage Law. The auditors disagreed. GEB offered to pay the employees the Living Wave underpayment. The audit was sent to Nassau's county and district attorneys for further review.

=== Long Island Bus study ===
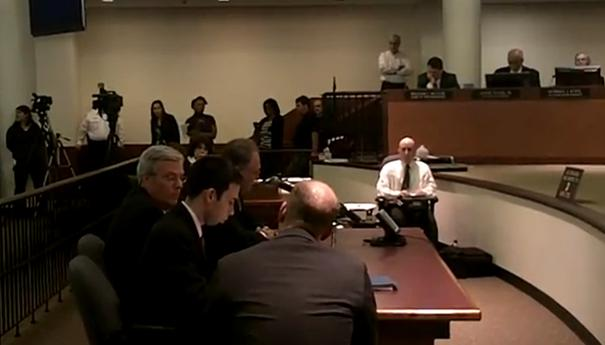
Maragos at the Nassau County Legislature testimony on the privatization of Island Bus in November 2010

Maragos released a study concerning the proposed privatization of Long Island Bus after over 35 years. The report recommended that the best option for Nassau County was to negotiate with the MTA to continue with the current service, with a more equitable subsidy. The MTA should first decrease the LIBS operating expense by about 4%, so that no increase in subsidies would be required for 2011 by either the MTA or the county. If an increase was necessary, then both the county and the MTA should proportionately increase their subsidies in order to keep the LIBS running. However, if negotiations failed and Nassau County was forced to contribute the full subsidy demanded by the MTA of over $36 million for 2011, then Maragos ultimately recommended that privatization should be pursued.

=== Parking ticket audit ===
In early 2011, Maragos released an audit of the Nassau County Traffic and Parking Violations Agency, which showed that on December 31, 2010, the agency had $44 million in uncollected traffic violation fines dating back ten years and $26 million in uncollected parking violations in the previous six years with red light camera passed due tickets estimated at over $10 million alone on December 31, 2011.

=== Consumer affairs audit ===
Maragos released an audit of the Nassau County Office of Consumer Affairs. The audit, conducted from January 1, 2013, to December 31, 2015, revealed that poor internal controls led to a loss of $2.9 million in county revenue. Missed violations from a lack of Item Pricing Waiver inspections resulted in approximately $1.5 million in uncollected fees. Maragos went on to say that a complete overhaul was needed to restore the confidence of the public and to improve efficiency.

=== Innovation ===
In January 2014, Maragos posted all vendor names, contract amounts and brief summaries of public contracts to social media via Facebook. This is considered to be the first time nationwide that public contracts had been released to the public in such a manner.

=== Awards ===
In 2010, Maragos and his staff were awarded a Certificate of Achievement for Excellence in Financial Reporting from the Government Finance Officers Association of the United States and Canada, for the county's 2009 Comprehensive Annual Financial Report. The comptroller's office was similarly recognized by the professional association in the next five years (2011–2015).

Other honors and awards include:

- Sergeant-at-Arms of the Queens Village Republican Club
- Public Service Award of the Hempstead Coordinating Council of Civic Associations, October 2013
- Hispanic Heritage Community Service Leadership Award, of the Theodore Roosevelt Council, Boy Scouts of America, October 2013
- Superstorm Sandy Leadership Award of the Long Island Contractors' Association (LICA), 2012

== Candidacy for Nassau County Executive 2017 ==
Maragos announced on September 29, 2016, that he would seek the Democratic nomination for Nassau County Executive in 2017. He stated that he had been at odds with County Republican leaders "for years" but, up until May 2016, he had still been donating heavily to Republicans and the County Republican Committee.

He was criticised by both Republicans and Democrats after his switch of party affiliation to run for county executive. Brian Nevin, the spokesman for Republican Edward P. Mangano, called him an opportunist with Conservative values that he trumpeted during his two failed Senate campaigns. Robert Zimmerman, the Democratic National Committeeman from Great Neck, called Maragos's switch "an affront to the principles and standards of the Democratic Party".

== Candidacy for United States Senate in 2012 ==
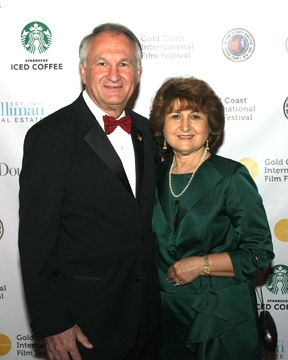
George Maragos and wife Angela in 2012

Maragos faced Congressman Bob Turner and attorney Wendy E. Long in a primary election to face Democratic Senator Kirsten Gillibrand. The 2012 New York State Republican Convention split the endorsement between the three candidates, with enough support for each candidate to automatically appear on the ballot. The primary was held on June 26, 2012, and the general election coincided with the presidential election on November 2.

Maragos was unable to win name recognition outside Nassau County and ultimately was defeated and came in last place.

Maragos also attempted to run for the US Senate in 2010.

== Political views ==
Maragos said during an interview, "Some people would even like to marry with their pets," worried that the legalization of gay marriage could also lead to the legalization of polygamy. At the time, he was against abortion, except to preserve the life of the mother or in cases of rape or incest. Maragos later explained that his views had "evolved", believing in the right of a woman to choose and that same-sex marriage is the law and should be respected.

== Personal ==
Maragos has been married to Angela since 1973, and has two sons, Peter and Angelo, and two grandchildren.

Political offices
Preceded by Howard Weitzman	Nassau County Comptroller; 2010–present	Succeeded by Jack Schnirman
