= 2025 New York Senate District 22 special election =

- May 20, 2025

New York Senate District 22
- Turnout: approx. 8% Unofficial results
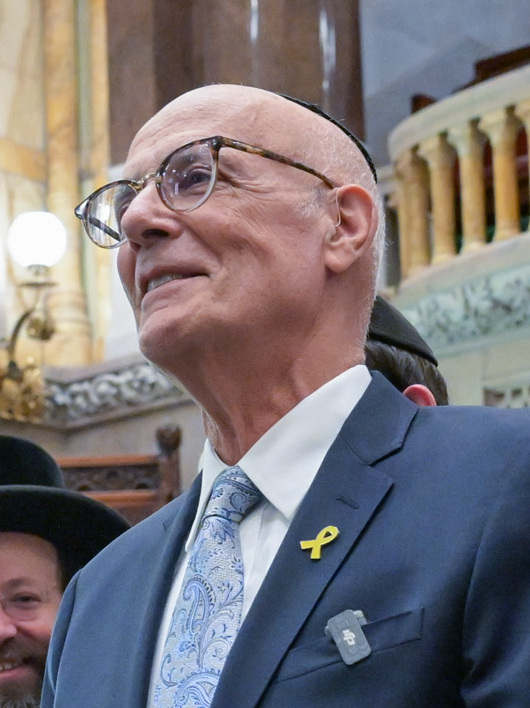

| Candidate | Sam Sutton | Nachman Caller |
| Party | Democratic | Republican |
| Alliance | | Conservative |
| Popular vote | 8,970 | 4,272 |
| Percentage | 67.03% | 31.92% |
- Sutton: 50–60% 70–80% Caller: 50–60% 60–70% Tie: 50% Sutton: 50–60% 60–70% 70–80% 80–90% >90% Caller: 50–60% 60–70% 70–80% 80–90%
Representative before election
Simcha Felder
Democratic
Elected Representative
Sam Sutton
Democratic

A special election in the U.S. state of New York was held on May 20, 2025, to elect a new member for the 22nd district in the New York Senate, representing a portion of Kings County, which is coextensive with the borough of Brooklyn. The election filled a vacancy caused by the resignation of Democratic state senator Simcha Felder upon his election to the New York City Council.

== Procedure and background ==
Voter party registration in Senate District 22 as of February 20, 2025 per the office of the State Board of Elections:
1. Democratic (49.6%)
2. Working Families (0.19%)
3. Republican (23.5%)
4. Conservative (0.65%)
5. Other (1.32%)
6. Unenrolled (24.8%)

The special election was made necessary by the resignation of Democratic incumbent Simcha Felder, after winning a special election to serve in the New York City Council from its 44th district on April 9, 2025. Felder was seen as a conservative Democrat, caucusing with the Senate Republicans from 2013 to 2019.

Governor of New York Kathy Hochul issued the writs of election on April 10, 2025, scheduling the election for May 20. Political parties had until April 17 to nominate candidates for the general election. Independent candidates had until April 21 to submit signatures to be placed on the ballot. Special elections in New York state have no primary elections. Early voting is available from May 10 through May 18.

Of the 155,468 registered voters in Senate District 22, 77,097 (49.6%) are Democrats, 36,471 (23.5%) are Republicans, 1,007 (0.7%) are Conservatives, 299 (0.2%) enrolled with the Working Families Party, 2,057 (1.3%) are "Other", and 38,537 (24.8%) are not enrolled with any political party.

Although the largely Orthodox Jewish community in the district overwhelmingly supported President Donald Trump in the 2024 presidential election, most Orthodox communities continue to vote for moderate or conservative Democrats who straddle party lines at the local level.

=== Previous results ===
The below table will show the last two State Senate elections in SD 22 after the 2020 redistricting cycle.

| Year | Winner | | | Opponents | | | Write-in | | Mgn. | Ref. |
|---|---|---|---|---|---|---|---|---|---|---|
| 2024 | Simcha Felder (Dem., i) | 21,959 | 29.01% | | | | 689 | 0.91% | D/R/C+98.18 | |
| 2024 | Simcha Felder (Rep., i) | 46,468 | 61.39% | | | | 689 | 0.91% | D/R/C+98.18 | |
| 2024 | Simcha Felder (Con., i) | 6,572 | 8.68% | | | | 689 | 0.91% | D/R/C+98.18 | |
| 2024 | Simcha Felder (Total, i) | 74,999 | 99.09% | | | | 689 | 0.91% | D/R/C+98.18 | |
| 2022 | Simcha Felder (Dem., i) | 16,386 | 26.17% | Marva C. Brown | 2,846 | 4.55% | 242 | 0.39% | D/R/C+90.52 | |
| 2022 | Simcha Felder (Rep., i) | 39,234 | 62.65% | Marva C. Brown | 2,846 | 4.55% | 242 | 0.39% | D/R/C+90.52 | |
| 2022 | Simcha Felder (Con., i) | 3,914 | 6.25% | Marva C. Brown | 2,846 | 4.55% | 242 | 0.39% | D/R/C+90.52 | |
| 2022 | Simcha Felder (Total, i) | 59,534 | 95.07% | Marva C. Brown | 2,846 | 4.55% | 242 | 0.39% | D/R/C+90.52 | |

== Nominees ==
Party nominees in New York state special elections are nominated by convention.

=== Republican Party ===
- Nachman Caller, attorney and Republican nominee for New York's 48th State Assembly district in 2014

=== Democratic Party ===
- Sam Sutton, nonprofit executive and activist (Democratic)

=== Third parties and independents ===
==== Conservative Party ====
- Nachman Caller, attorney and Republican nominee for New York's 48th State Assembly district in 2014

== General election ==
=== Endorsements ===
Nachman Caller (R/C)

U.S. representatives

- Mike Lawler, U.S. Representative from NY-17 (2023–present)
- Elise Stefanik, U.S. Representative from NY-21 (2015–present)

State legislators

- Lester Chang, state assemblymember from the 49th district (2023–present)
- Carl Kruger, former state senator from the 27th district (1994–2012)
- David Storobin, former state senator from the 27th district (2012)
Sam Sutton (D)

U.S. representatives

- Ritchie Torres, U.S. Representative from NY-15 (2021–present)

State legislators

- Rodneyse Bichotte Hermelyn, state assemblymember from the 42nd district (2015–present) and chair of the Brooklyn Democratic Party (2020–present)
- Simcha Eichenstein, state assemblymember from the 48th district (2019–present)
- Michael Gianaris, state senator from the 12th district (2011–present)
- Andrew Gounardes, state senator from the 26th district (2023–present)
- Nily Rozic, state assemblymember from the 25th district (2013–present)
- Grace Lee, state assemblymember from the 65th district (2023–present)
- Stacey Pheffer Amato, state assemblymember from the 23rd district (2017–present)
- Jessica Scarcella-Spanton, state senator from the 23rd district (2023–present)
- Frank Seddio, former state assemblymember from the 59th district (1999–2006)
- Helene Weinstein, former state assemblymember from the 41st district (1981–2024)
- Kalman Yeger, state assemblymember from the 41st district (2025–present)

Local officials

- Justin Brannan, city councilmember from the 47th district (2024–present)
- Mark Levine, borough president of Manhattan (2022–present)
- Farah Louis, city councilmember from the 45th district (2019–present)
- Susan Zhuang, city councilmember from the 43rd district (2019–present)

Organizations

- Brooklyn Democratic Party

=== Results ===
2025 New York Senate District 22 special election
| Party | Candidate | Votes | % |
|---|---|---|---|
| Democratic | Sam Sutton | 8,970 | 67.03% |
| Republican | Nachman Caller | 3,736 | 27.92% |
| Conservative | Nachman Caller | 536 | 4.01% |
| Total | Nachman Caller | 4,272 | 31.92% |
| Write-in | | 140 | 1.05% |
| Total votes | | 13,382 | 100.00% |
| Turnout | | | ~8% |
| Registered electors | | 155,468 | |
