= Steingut =

Steingut is a German surname, it means stoneware. Notable people with the surname include:

- Irwin Steingut (1893–1952), American lawyer, businessman and politician
- Stanley Steingut (1920–1989), American politician, son of Irwin
