= David Greenfield =

David Greenfield may refer to:

- Dave Greenfield (1949–2020), English keyboard player with The Stranglers
- David G. Greenfield (born 1978), American politician
- David Greenfield (Canadian politician) (born 1967)
- David W. Greenfield, American ichthyologist and marine biologist
