= Dominican Commercial High School =

Catholic school in New York City

Location
- 161-06 89th Avenue, Jamaica, Queens; New York; United States

Information
- Type: Catholic school
- Established: 1936
- Closed: 1998
- Grades: 9 – 12
- Gender: Girls

Dominican Commercial High School was a Catholic high school in Jamaica, Queens, New York City. An all-girls school, it was located at 161-06 89th Avenue. The school first opened in 1936, and moved to its new building on 161st and 89th Avenue in 1938 (leaving the previous building to be converted into a convent). The school closed in 1998. The building later became Wellington Hall, an education facility for Association for the Advancement of the Blind and Retarded (now known as Intellectually Disabled).

As of 1941, Dominican Commercial was one of the two largest parochial schools in Jamaica, along with the Mary Louis Academy. Dominican Commercial focused on preparing students for careers directly out of high school. The school was initially not focused on college preparation.

== Alumni ==
- Barbara Bach, actress and wife of Ringo Starr
- Diane Savino, member of the New York State Senate from the 23rd district
