= SBH =

SBH can refer to:

- Stellar black hole or Supermassive black hole
- Gustaf III Airport, Saint Barthélemy, IATA code
- Sephardic Bikur Holim, a charity organisation
- Sequencing by hybridization, DNA sequencing method
- The Service Book and Hymnal of Lutheran churches
- Singapore Badminton Hall
- State Bank of Hyderabad
