= Sam Sutton =

Sam Sutton may refer to:

- Sam Sutton (footballer)
- Sam Sutton (politician)
