= Murray Weinstein =

American politician and attorney

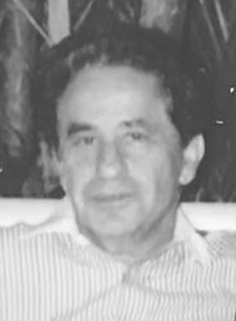
- Murray Weinstein

Member of the New York State Assembly from the 41st district
- In office January 1, 1979 – December 31, 1980
- Preceded by: Stanley Steingut
- Succeeded by: Helene Weinstein

Personal details
- Born: June 6, 1928 Brooklyn, New York, U.S.
- Died: March 15, 2014
- Resting place: New Montefiore Cemetery
- Party: Democratic
- Children: Helene Weinstein, Vicky De Groot, Irwin Weinstein
- Education: Harvard Law School (JD)

Murray Weinstein (born June 6, 1928) was an American politician who represented District 41 in the New York State Assembly, which comprises Sheepshead Bay, Flatlands, East Flatbush, Midwood and Canarsie, in Brooklyn.

== Biography ==
Elected in 1978, Weinstein won a stunning upset over Speaker of the New York State Assembly and Brooklyn Democratic Party boss Stanley Steingut for the 41st Assembly seat.

Weinstein had only stepped into the race a week before the primary vote as a stand-in for his daughter Helene Weinstein. The younger Weinstein had primaried Steingut, backed by the New Way Democratic Club, a newly formed organization which operated out of a storefront and challenged the influence of Steingut’s powerful Madison Club.

Andrew Stein had endorsed Ms. Weinstein against Steingut and began actively working for her in July, later saying that when he realized Steingut would not be indicted for the nursing home scandals, he "made up [his] mind to destroy him." After allegations concerning the Towers Nursing Home, and other scandals, became a focus of the primary, Steingut attacked Weinstein's residency in court and on August 30, Ms. Weinstein was ruled off the ballot with seven days left before the primary. The elder Weinstein then stepped in one week before the primary vote as a stand-in for his daughter. Steingut announced that he would get off the ballot only if he were appointed to a judgeship.

On November 7, Murray Weinstein beat Steingut 10,297 to 9,079, a margin of a little more than 6% of all votes cast, effectively ending Steingut's political career after 26 years in the Assembly and the influence of the Madison Club.

Stein said that the campaign was one of "great nastiness, fought block by block, like nothing we ever see in Manhattan". Lloyd Berlin, a Weinstein worker who was a defector from Steingut's MadisonClub, agreed with Stein that the Speaker's “arrogance” was the issue.

=== Education ===
Weinstein held a Juris Doctor from Harvard Law School.

=== Occupation ===
Weinstein was an attorney licensed to practice law in New York State and a founding partner of the personal-injury law firm, Weinstein, Chase, Messinger & Peters, P.C.
