= Kalman Yeger =

American politician

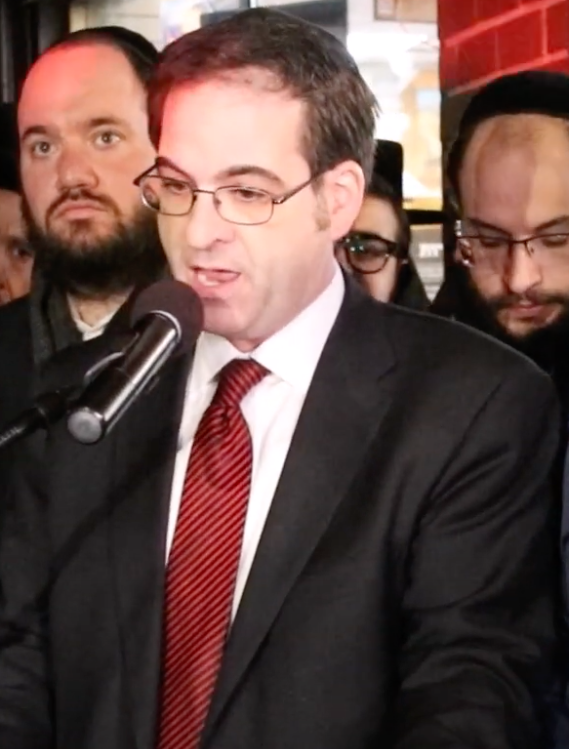

Member of the New York State Assembly from the 41st district
- Incumbent
- Assumed office January 1, 2025
- Preceded by: Helene Weinstein

Member of the New York City Council from the 44th district
- In office January 1, 2018 – December 31, 2024
- Preceded by: David G. Greenfield
- Succeeded by: Simcha Felder

Personal details
- Born: April 26, 1974 (age 52)
- Party: Democratic
- Education: Touro University (BA); New York Law School (JD)

Kalman Yeger (born April 26, 1974) is an American politician who serves in the New York State Assembly for the 41st district. He is a conservative member of the Democratic Party. On November 5, 2024, Yeger won an uncontested election for the Assembly seat which is located in Brooklyn and includes all or part of the neighborhoods of Flatlands and Sheepshead Bay, as well as parts of East Flatbush, Midwood, and Canarsie.

== Early life and education ==
Yeger, who has lived in Brooklyn his entire life, is a graduate of Touro College with a B.A. degree and New York Law School with a J.D. degree in 2011.

== Career ==
Yeger began his career as a community liaison and assistant to New York City Councilman Lloyd Henry. He then went on to work as a top advisor to Bronx Borough President Fernando Ferrer, including as the executive director of Ferrer's 2001 and 2005 campaigns for NYC Mayor. In 2010, he began working as senior advisor and counsel to New York City Councilman David G. Greenfield. In 2012, Yeger worked as a senior advisor for Simcha Felder's successful New York State Senate campaign.

Yeger has been a member of Brooklyn Community Board 14 since 2000. He has advised a slew of public officials, including former Borough President and former NYC Mayor Eric Adams, former Borough President and current Queens District Attorney Melinda Katz, as well as former NYC Councilmembers Alan Maisel, Lew Fidler, David Yassky, and Mike Nelson.

=== City Council ===
In 2017, outgoing councilmember David Greenfield encouraged Yeger to run for his council seat, as Greenfield decided not to run for re-election, instead taking over the helm of New York's largest Jewish charity, the Metropolitan Council on Jewish Poverty. Opposing Yeger, was Yoni Hikind, the son of former New York State Assemblyman, Dov Hikind, whose district covered much of the same constituency. Yeger received endorsements from the four unions representing the NYPD, which are the Patrolmen's Benevolent Association (PBA), the Detectives Endowment Association (DEA), the Lieutenants Benevolent Association (LBA), and the Captains Endowment Association (CEA), as well as The United Federation of Teachers. Yeger also received the endorsement of the then four Democratic NYC Borough Presidents including then NYC Mayor Eric Adams, as well as Melinda Katz, Ruben Diaz Jr, and Gale Brewer.

In 2021, Yeger won re-election after running unopposed in the general election. Yeger, who ran on the Democrat, Republican, and Conservative lines garnered 97.8% of the vote.

In 2023, Yeger won the Democratic Primary unopposed while also defeating Harold "Heshy" Tischler in the Republican Primary 52%-48%. In the general election, Yeger who again ran on the Democratic, Republican, and Conservative lines, received 80% of the vote, trouncing Tischler again, who this time ran under the Boro Park Flatbush Party line. Yeger received the endorsement of The New York City Correction Officers’ Benevolent Association.

Yeger resigned his Council position as of Jan 1, 2025 in order to start his term as a New York State Assembly Member. In his final council term, he served on the following committees:

- Health
- Public Safety
- Sanitation and Solid Waste Management
- Oversight and Investigation
- Fire and Emergency Management

=== State Assembly ===
In 2024, Yeger ran for New York State's 41st Assembly seat, which was held by longtime Assembly Member Helene Weinstein who was retiring after a record-breaking 44 years. Yeger won the primary with 70.7% of the vote, defeating Adam Dweck. Yeger was endorsed by Weinstein, NYS Senator Simcha Felder, NYS Assembly Member Simcha Eichenstein, former Councilman David Greenfield, and pro-Israel Solidarity PAC. Although Yeger ran unopposed in the general election, he still earned endorsements, such as from The Jewish Press.

== Election results ==
2024 New York State's 41st Assembly District General Election
Party	Candidate	Votes	%
Democratic	Kalman Yeger	19,061	50.6%
Republican	Kalman Yeger	16,305	43.3%
Conservative	Kalman Yeger	1,982	5.3%
Total	Kalman Yeger	37,348	99.1%
Write-in		345	0.9%
Total votes		37,693	100.0%

2024 New York State's 41st Assembly District Primary Election
Party	Candidate	Votes	%
Democratic	Kalman Yeger	2,655	70.7%
Democratic	Adam Dweck	1,099	29.3%
Total votes		3,754	100%

2023 New York City's 44th City Council District General Election
Party	Candidate	Votes	%
Republican	Kalman Yeger	3,936	41.96%
Democratic	Kalman Yeger	2,779	29.63%
Conservative	Kalman Yeger	785	8.37%
Total	Kalman Yeger (incumbent)	7,500	79.96%
Boro Park Flatbush	Harold Tischler	1,732	18.46%
Write-in		148	1.58%
Total votes		9,380	100.0%

2023 New York City's 44th City Council District Republican primary
Party	Candidate	Votes	%
Republican	Kalman Yeger (incumbent)	395	51.2%
Republican	Harold Tischler	365	47.3%
Write-in		12	1.6%
Total votes		772	100.0%

2021 New York City's 44th City Council District General Election
Party	Candidate	Votes	%
Republican	Kalman Yeger	6,678	55.5%
Democratic	Kalman Yeger	4,153	34.5%
Conservative	Kalman Yeger	924	7.6%
Total	Kalman Yeger (incumbent)	12,021	97.7%
Write-in		266	2.2%
Total votes		12,287	100%

2017 New York City's 44th City Council District General Election
Party	Candidate	Votes	%
Democratic	Kalman Yeger	8,277	48.83%
Conservative	Kalman Yeger	3,057	18.03%
Total	Kalman Yeger	11,334	66.9%
Our Neighborhood	Yoni Hikind	4,854	28.6%
School Choice	Harold Tischler	670	4.0%
Write-in		93	0.5%
Total votes		16,951	100%

== Political views and controversy ==
On March 26, 2019, Yeger accused Democratic Minnesota Congresswoman Ilhan Omar of being an anti-semite, and claimed that "Palestine does not exist". This resulted in protests outside Yeger's office in Boro Park. He was later removed from the New York City Council's immigration committee.

On October 30, 2022, Yeger tweeted a video of a group of bikers taking over a New York City street. Yeger compared these bikers to cockroaches, saying, "Like cockroaches, there's never just one". Yeger received major backlash as a result, with many calling the tweet racist, pointing out that a majority of the bikers were black and brown. He subsequently deleted the tweet that same day.

In 2024, Shtetl reported Yeger had spent several years refusing to grant his ex-wife a get, in an attempt to condition the document issuance to her signing a nondisclosure agreement. Yeger withdrew his demand for the nondisclosure agreement after a protest campaign and the divorce was finalized on the day of Yeger's assembly primary election.
