= Stanley Steingut =

American politician (1920–1989)

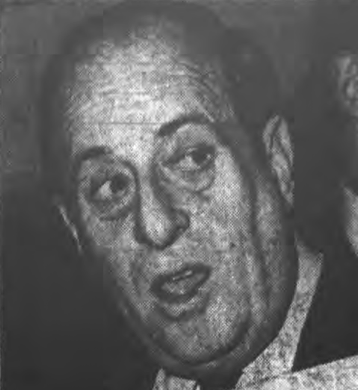
- Steingut in 1969

115th Speaker of the New York State Assembly
- In office January 8, 1975 – December 31, 1978
- Governor: Hugh Carey
- Preceded by: Perry Duryea
- Succeeded by: Stanley Fink

Member of the New York State Assembly
- In office January 1, 1953 – December 31, 1978
- Preceded by: Irwin Steingut
- Succeeded by: Murray Weinstein
- Constituency: Kings County's 18th district (1953-1965); 44th district (1966); 41st district (1967-1978)

Personal details
- Born: May 20, 1920 Crown Heights, Brooklyn, New York, U.S.
- Died: December 8, 1989 (aged 69) New York City, New York, U.S.
- Party: Democratic
- Spouse: Madeline Fellerman
- Children: 3
- Education: Peddie School; Union College; St. John's University School of Law
- Profession: Lawyer

Stanley Steingut (May 20, 1920 – December 8, 1989) was an American politician, New York Democratic Party leader, insurance brokerage owner, and lawyer. He took over his father's position as boss of Brooklyn County Democratic politics and eventually parlayed that position to become Speaker of the New York State Assembly. Before reaching that office, Steingut engaged in a power struggle along with Reform Democrats beginning in the early-1960s, when he was an early and powerful supporter of Robert F. Kennedy's bid for Senate from New York. In the late 1950s, he was an early supporter of then-Senator John F. Kennedy's bid for the nomination of the Democratic Party for the presidency. His support of both Kennedys caused a major rift with Tammany Hall Democrats led by then-Mayor Wagner. Those loyal to Wagner combined with Rockefeller Republicans deprived him of the Speakership in 1965 even though he had a great majority of the Democratic Assembly members. He would not take over the party leadership in the Assembly until 1969. He considered his sponsorship of landmark legislation providing public educational services for the developmentally disabled his greatest legislative accomplishment.

Political enmity did not then die out, and allegations of self-dealing began to dog him. Ultimately at the height of his political power within the Assembly, a primary challenge arose from a nearly unknown candidate. Steingut had been an ardent supporter of abortion as well as an outspoken foe of the death penalty. Although Steingut was supported by high-profile Democrats and employed a court challenge to save his seat, he ultimately lost. He spent the rest of his life as a lawyer refusing many opportunities to trade on his relationships by engaging in lobbying.

== Early life ==
Stanley Steingut was the son of Irwin Steingut, a first-generation American, himself the son an immigrant from Hamburg (Simon Steingut) who left his own prosperous family (his father and brother were bankers with their own firm in Hamburg) to emigrate to the United States sometime before 1886. Irwin Steingut worked first as a reporter and then in his father's Manhattan real estate office, before his 30-year career as New York Assemblyman from Kings County (1922-1952). During that time, he acted as minority leader from 1930 to 1934 and 1936 to 1952 and was Speaker in 1935 for the one term that Democrats had a majority in the New York Assembly during the 51 years from 1914 through 1964.

Stanley Steingut was born on May 20, 1920, in the Crown Heights section of Brooklyn to Irwin Steingut and Rae Kaufmann Steingut. He was the couple's second and only other child, his older sister June Eleanor having been born on August 12, 1917. He attended the Peddie School and Union College. He served as a chief petty officer in the U.S. Naval Reserve during World War II, went on to graduate from St. John's University School of Law and was admitted to the New York bar in 1950.

== Early politics ==
Stanley learned retail politics at a young age from his father, with whom he campaigned door to door. When he was in college at nearby Schenectady, he was a familiar figure in Albany, where he acquired the name "Zip" (owing to a "garment mishap"). Late in life he would recall swimming with Franklin D. Roosevelt in the Governor's mansion in Albany as well as in the White House and running errands as a page boy for Al Smith.

In Brooklyn, his father's political base was the Madison Club of Brooklyn, a machine founded by his mentor John H. McCooey, who sponsored Irwin Steingut's first run for the Assembly in 1921. Steingut's father became head of the Club during the New Deal (in part to appease the Administration for McCooey's decision to support Al Smith over Franklin D. Roosevelt) and remained boss until his death. Steingut joined the Madison Club early, and it was there that he came into close contact with his father's friends, who also came to Brooklyn from Manhattan's Lower East Side: Abraham "Abe" Beame and Nathan Sobel. When his father died in 1952, Steingut stepped into the leadership position of the Madison Club. He would become head of the Brooklyn Democratic Committee in 1962 (together with Congresswoman Edna F. Kelly, a protege of Irwin Steingut). In that position, he would amass "vast power and patronage." Influential columnist Jack Newfield would call him "a charter member of the Permanent Government."

== New York Assembly career ==
In 1953 Steingut also succeeded to his father's Assembly seat, which he would hold until his defeat in 1978, sitting in the 169th, 170th, 171st, 172nd, 173rd, 174th, 175th, 176th, 177th, 178th, 179th, 180th, 181st and 182nd New York State Legislatures.

He was never known as a legislative craftsman, but early in his career, he worked diligently as a member of the joint legislative committee on physical handicaps and on mental retardation and eventually was appointed chairman of the Joint Committee on Child Care Needs. These areas became closely associated with him since the 1950s when he co-sponsored many programs with Republican Earl Brydges, who was especially interested in education policy and mental health issues. In 1957 he received an award from the Association for the Help of Retarded Children in which he was cited for "his contributions on behalf of the mentally retarded in the field of community services ... ."

Throughout the years, reporters remarked on his unprepossessing appearance. One said that "his slow-moving bulk, his heavy-bagged eyes, his thinning reddish hair and the creases in his face make it seem as if he was born old and has weathered since under the stresses of political wars." As a public speaker he was called "lackluster," and he was always "wary of reporters." Steingut once told one: "I have no comment—and that's off the record." His most memorable elocution in the Assembly emphasized mixed metaphors. He warned of the dangers of a bill that would "derail the ship of state," and he tried to move his colleagues by noting that "this session has been hit by an avalanche of creeping paralysis."

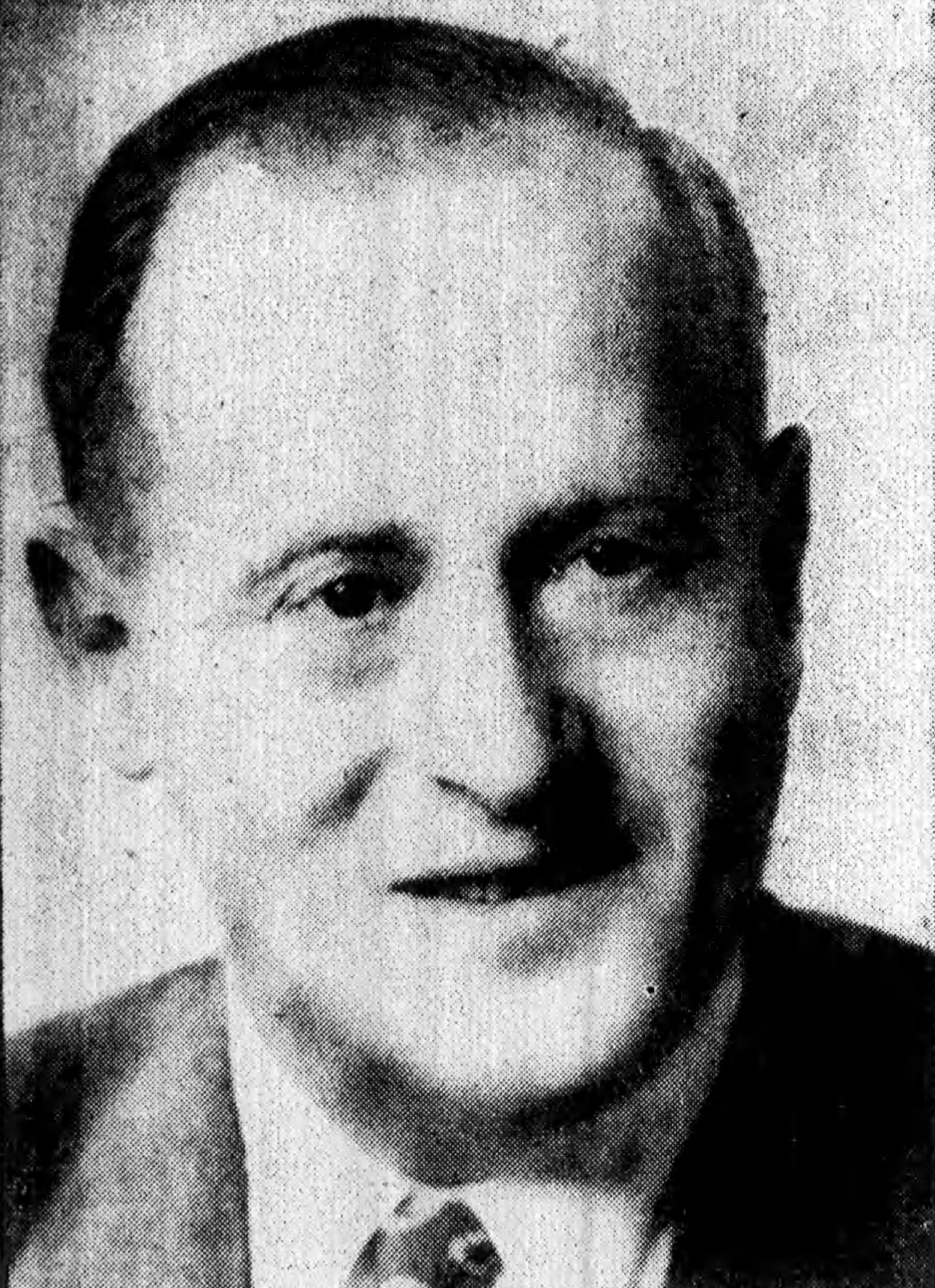
Photo of Stanley Steingut from Brooklyn Daily, May 22, 1957, p. 15 (uncredited).

He excelled, as a practitioner of back room, inside-party politics. "He's the greatest checker mover in town," one Democrat said, explaining his skill in promoting young acolytes, while also creating new positions for others to enter into the system. This was one of McCooey's guiding principles for maintaining a political machine. He was also known for having a tireless work ethic, and for demanding the same from his colleagues, often rising to call fellow Democrats and his staff before 6 a.m. to discuss political business.

His abiding passion was to obtain the position his father had, Speaker of the Assembly, and was said to have harbored this single-minded goal "all of his life." Two things were needed for that to happen: Steingut would have to become the leader of the Assembly Democrats and the Democrats would have to become the majority party. When Eugene Bannigan died on July 4, 1958, Steingut sought to replace him as Minority Leader. Steingut was relatively junior by Albany standards and lacked the necessary "political muscle." The Democrats then controlled by Tammany Hall leader Carmine DeSapio chose Anthony Travia, also of Brooklyn, instead.

By 1964, with 15 years in the Assembly, Steingut was ready to try again, and this time the political muscle would be aided by the extensive organization of newcomer (to New York politics) Robert F. Kennedy. At the initial suggestion of Steingut after learning that President Johnson would not ask him to be his running mate, Kennedy reluctantly reconsidered a run for the Senate from New York, something he denied contemplating on June 22. Almost all the Democratic bosses and machine politicians (including Nassau County boss John English, Erie County chairman Peter Crotty, Bronx boss Charles Buckley, powerful Harlem Congressman Adam Clayton Powell Jr. and Steingut) supported Kennedy, impressed with the need for fresh blood in the party, which had not won a Senate seat since 1950 or the Governor's office since 1954, despite the advantage of 500,000 more registered voters than the Republican Party. One time Tammany machine politician Mayor Robert Wagner now represented the opponents of Kennedy, who like the New York Times and the New York Herald Tribune and others opposed Kennedy and put forward the lackluster upstate Congressman Sam Stratton. Wagner's goal was to maintain control of the state party with a view to his own governor's race in 1966. Kennedy easily defeated Stratton on September 1. Despite a rambling general election campaign, Kennedy defeated Senator Kenneth Keating, largely on the coattails of Johnson's landslide victory, which also gave Democrats their first Assembly majority since Steingut's father was Speaker in 1935.

On November 17, Steingut made clear he was running for Speaker. Although Kennedy himself claimed to be neutral, the Kennedy coalition together with Kennedy's brother-in-law and campaign manager Stephen Smith and Kennedy scheduler Justin Feldman appeared to be actively supporting Steingut. There were unfounded charges of "crude" tactics including offers of campaign cash, threats of retaliation and, according to Wagner, promises of increased "lulus" (the term for legislators' untabulated expense accounts). On December 22–23, 1964, at an informal party conference in Albany Steingut was preferred over Travia by a vote of 52 to 33. Both the state party chairman and the state party national committeeman supported Steingut. At this point, Wagner rallied assemblymen loyal to him to salvage his control over the state party. Their principal charge was that Steingut "was the 'principal architect' of the move to install Senator Julian B. Erway, an Albany conservative, as majority leader of the Senate. In fact, the takeover of the state legislature was largely owing to the election of upstate Democrats. The coalition behind Steingut having determined to allow upstate Democrats an important leadership position, the Senate was decided upon, and they, therefore, passed over Manhattan Senator and minority leader Joseph Zaretzki. Upstate Democrats then fixed on Erway for the position, and long-time Albany Democratic boss Daniel P. O'Connell consented. In the face of liberal opposition, however, Erway withdrew, as (seemingly) did Steingut's choice Jack E. Bronston who ran afoul of Queens boss Moses M. Weinstein, a Wagner supporter. The missteps of the Steingut coalition appeared to have fractured the unanimous support he had at the informal caucus. Steingut could not muster a majority of the members in either house, and the legislature was unable to function for six weeks while the leadership dispute continued.

In the end, Wagner made a deal with Governor Nelson Rockefeller, and on February 3, 1965 Republicans voted with the Wagner Democrats to elect Zaretzki Senate majority leader with the votes of 25 Republicans and 15 Democrats. His opponent Bronston got 18 Democratic votes. The next day the Assembly elected Travia with the votes of 46 Republicans and 35 Wagner Democrats. Steingut received the votes of 53 Democrats and 3 Republicans. Later in that session, nearly all the Wagner Democrats voted with the Republican to pass an unpopular 2% increase in the sales tax proposed by Rockefeller.

Wagner's victory, in the end, could not have pleased either of his blocs, the reformers or the liberals. Zaretzki lived up to the description of New York Times editorial board member William Shannon: "To call Zaretzki a hack, would be undue praise." Jack Newfield of the liberal Village Voice found Travia as conservative as Zaretzki, and although brighter, was friendly with Rockefeller. And Travia became recognized as the "arch-enemy of the so-called 'reform wing' of the state Democratic Party." Kennedy for one was outraged, as can be gathered from his letter to Zaretzki and Travia after their win, notwithstanding his officially neutral stance. Steingut took the defeat stoically. Under Speaker Travia Steingut "bided his time quietly ... seldom spoke on the floor' and "talked guarded with reporters." He worked mainly on welfare legislation and adoption reform.

In the summer of 1968, Travia was appointed federal judge, and Moses Weinstein, who sided with Travia in 1965, became acting Speaker to fill out the year. With Travia out of the way, the next session might have been Steingut's opportunity, but 1968 was a bad year for Democrats generally. Richard Nixon took the White House, and while Hubert Humphrey carried New York, Republicans again took the Assembly. But it was not a decisive victory: a change of 4 seats in the election in two years would bring the Democrats back. And so, while winning the Minority Leadership position in the Assembly is often seen as being designated heir apparent for the Speakership, it was especially urgent to be elected to that position now. But Weinstein wanted it and wanted to be elected Speaker on the merits next time, so he called a caucus of Democrats before the floor vote. Steingut had lined up the votes in private and came away with 55 of the 57 votes cast, with Weinstein's colleagues from Queens largely abstaining. Part of the arrangement Steingut had made was giving up control of the Brooklyn Democratic Committee, and its vast pool of influence, associations, and favor-seekers. The Committee, however, fell into the hands of Steingut's close associate and business partner Meade Esposito. Many assumed Esposito did Steingut's bidding because they would continue to see "Steingut's fine hand in some of the Machievellian maneuvers in the Brooklyn political scene." But most evidently believed that this was part of the bargain, and in any event, they had been looking for one "with the agility and the grit and the savvy needed to play the political leadership game well." In any event, all expected he would be "solid, effective and liberal—not brilliant, but steady ... ."

Giving up the Brooklyn power base for the one in the Assembly might have proved beneficial to Steingut's outside interests. While in the Assembly Steingut also was a member of the law firm Halperin, Shivitz, Scholer & Steingut. He acquired the share in City Title Insurance Company that his father had and before him legislators from both parties. Steingut also became a partner with Esposito in Grand Brokerage Agency, an insurance brokerage firm. Steingut used his political connections to refer business to all three firms. While this practice (widespread enough in New York) was not illegal, it became embarrassing just as he was poised to become Speaker before what seemed as the inevitable Democratic sweep in November 1974 in light of the Watergate scandal. Steingut publicly promised that if elected Speaker he would divest himself of all outside business interests as well as resign from the law firm where he was a partner. He did, in fact, abide by that commitment.

Commentators were advising that in the circumstances politicians should steer clear even of the appearance of impropriety. Steingut had, however, developed the reputation of being, as one put it, "the Democratic party's quintessential hack, living proof that you can still make money in politics." Steingut insisted that he did not profit from political connections, but the perception remained and was compounded by the lack of discretion of his partner Meade Esposito, who once said: "people wouldn't be bringing their business [to Grand] if I wasn't the county leader." In an effort at transparency, Steingut offered to make limited financial disclosure (he refused to disclose his tax returns, however), which he claimed would show his net worth was not great. The response was wry cynicism. One Democratic politician said: "If word gets out that Stanley hasn't made a bundle, it would drive people out of politics."

One month before the election, Steingut made what was an astonishing error for one who treated the press so carefully. During a half-hour interview with Bob Anson of New York's Channel 13 on October 7, 1974, Steingut stated that Grand Agency had stayed away "with great circumspection from any insurance with government at all. Any at all." Pressed further he not only denied that Grand Agency had the insurance on Brighton Housing but also said it had "nothing to do with it." That week the Village Voice printed the Grand Agency binder with Brighton Housing Inc. and also revealed that City Title had insured title on $125 million of New York City Mitchell-Lama Housing buildings. A New York Times exposé of Bernard Bergman's disgraced Towers Nursing Home showed that its insurance was placed through Grand Agency. And on November 7 the Village Voice had further revelations. City Title Insurance, for example, insured the property of the 142-unit Jewish Hospital Staff Residence in Brooklyn, while Steingut's law firm acted as counsel on the project, and a substantial architectural fee went to fellow Brooklyn Assemblyman and friend Alfred Lama. Steingut tried to explain that he misunderstood the question. Columnist Michael Kramer opined that either Steingut lied or he was "too dumb" to be Speaker. Newfield punned that Steingut "puts a premium on deceit."

The revelations and other embarrassments (he was, for example, trustee of Touro College, which was under investigation by the attorney general for a possible illegal scheme to tie Medicaid payments to leaseback contracts) did not derail his hopes, and the Democrats elected him Speaker when they retook the Assembly with a substantial 88 to 62 seat majority.

== Speakership and decline ==
When he took the gavel in January 1975 (40 years to the day after his father did and 10 years after he had previously been prevented), Steingut's victory was part of a greater triumph for his Madison Club. The previous year, Abe Beame had been sworn in as Mayor of New York City by now-Justice Nathan Sobel. Steingut's mother told him then that in heaven his father "must be smiling." Later, when Madison Club member Hugh Carey was elected governor in November, ending 16 years of Republican occupancy of that office, Steingut told his mother, "Hugh is one of us." Under New York state's peculiar division of power, Steingut himself had become (with the Governor and President of the Senate) one of the three most important elected officials with not only unlimited ability to schedule legislation but also the sole power to appoint Assembly committee members and chairmen and each of the (at the time) 1,400 full-time and part-time employees of the Assembly. It would prove to be the high-water mark of the Madison Club.

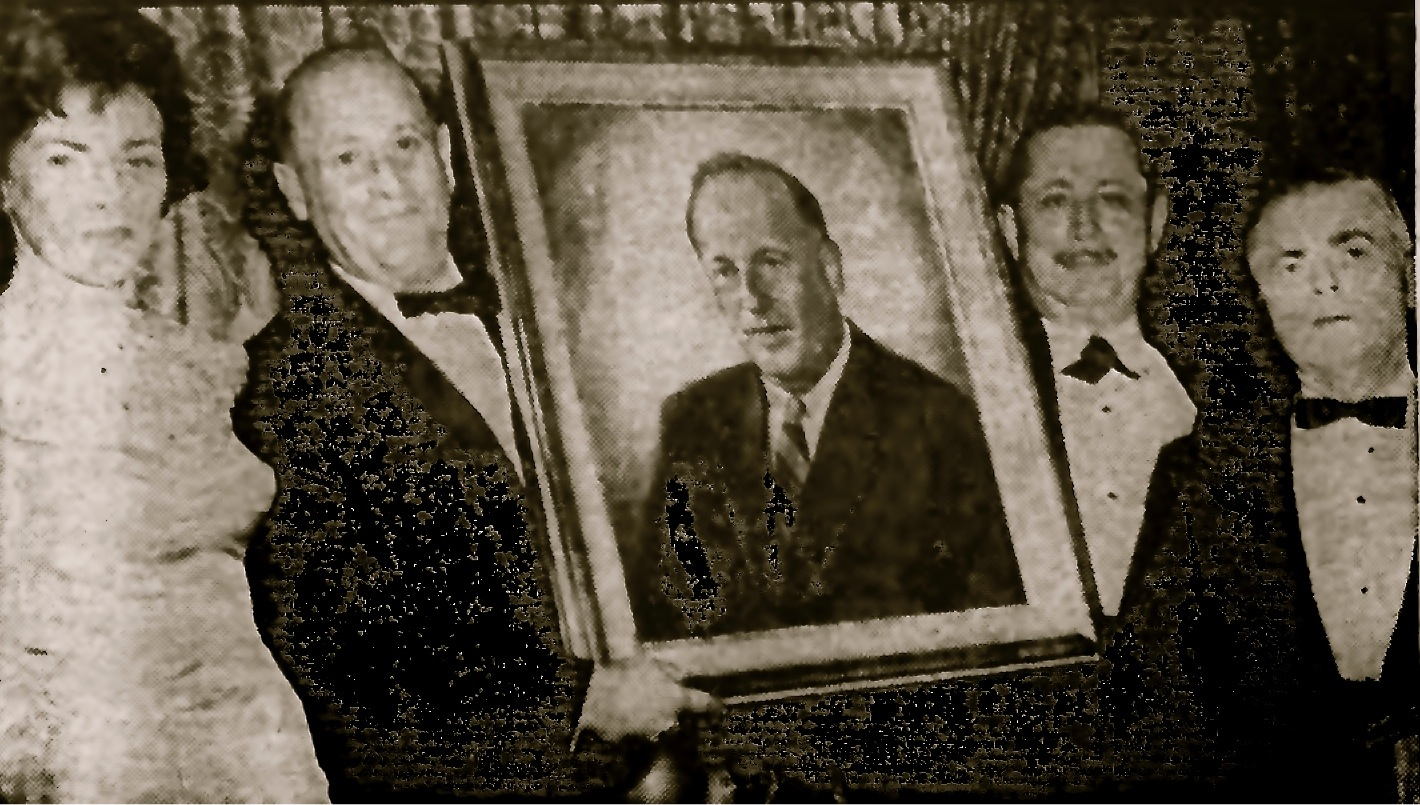
Stanley Steingut receiving a portrait from Crown Heights Yeshiva for "'distinguished contributions' in fostering educational growth of the community." Madeline Steingut on left. Abe Beame on far right.

Even before taking the gavel, Steingut attempted to improve his image by striking populist themes in a mildly progressive package designed to reform the way the Assembly did business. In fact, he was trying to fend off a group of serious reform-minded Democrats, the Democratic Study Group, who formed a substantial bloc in the Assembly. "Reform" in Albany had always meant reducing the substantial power of the Speaker. In the end, Steingut acceded to a few demands. He gave up the Speaker's unfettered "right" to "star" calendared bills in order to prevent consideration by the Assembly. He also agreed to provide each member $7,500 to staff district and Albany offices and to discontinue the practice of using County Democratic Leaders (like Esposito) as whips. Machine politicians saw these steps as the beginning of the end. Meade Esposito later claimed that giving assemblymen their own offices obviated the need for them to meet in the clubhouse where he dealt with them, and, as a result, his influence as party leader waned. "Reform was beginning to set in, you know," he said. "And that didn't do too much good."

The concessions also failed to please his critics. Michael Kramer said that Steingut was "using 'legislative reform' as a smoke screen to hide his real interest, the perpetuation of the business-political web that allowed him to prosper while he serves in Albany." Reform-minded Democratic politicians were more threatening. New York mayor Robert Wagner had blocked Steingut's ambition in the 1960s. The second time in 1974, Wagner (now an ex-mayor who had not mounted the campaign for governor in 1966 that was at the heart of his earlier opposition to Steingut) was openly leading the fight against Steingut's election as Speaker, but this time (with no Republican support) he was not successful. A more persistent antagonist of Steingut emerged, however, in the early 1970s—the son of Steingut's former friend Jerry Finkelstein, Assemblyman from Manhattan Andrew Stein. The first skirmish between Stein and Steingut took place in 1974 when Stein accused Steingut of using "back room pressure politics" to end Stein's investigation of Medicaid fraud and abuses at state nursing homes. Steingut claimed in response that he was preparing his own investigation, for which Stein was seeking credit. Stein carried on, however, and his work eventually led to the appointment of special prosecutor Charles Hynes, an assistant district attorney in Brooklyn. The extensive investigations by Hynes and his final report never mentioned any wrongdoing by Steingut. Stein continued to pursue Steingut on claims of corrupt relations with Bernard Bergman. Steingut was vulnerable not only because of insurance firm had extensive dealings with Towers Nursing Home but also because Steingut's attorney, Daniel Chill, represented Bergman before state agencies.

In the midst of mounting scandals relating to his insurance interests, Steingut was indicted together with his son by a Brooklyn grand jury on charges of corruption relating to Robert Steingut's election campaign for a New York City councilman-at-large seat. The indictment alleged that Steingut and his son promised to assist Hans Rubenfeld, a Bronx haberdasher, in obtaining an appointment to an unpaid honorary non-existent City position in exchange for a $2,500 in contribution to Robert Steingut's campaign. The New York Court of Appeals two years later dismissed the indictment on the threshold ground that the indictment by the Brooklyn District Attorney did not plead a "materially harmful impact on governmental processes," which gave the impression that he was cleared on a technicality. The matter had in fact been transferred to the office of Manhattan District Attorney Robert Morgenthau, known as Mr. District Attorney, who after an extensive investigation declined to even present the case to a grand jury, saying that there was no evidence of any wrongdoing.

In January 1978, at the beginning of the next legislative session, having weathered the nursing homes scandals and avoided a criminal trial, Speaker Steingut's prospects were as bright as at any time in his career. Democrats had added three more seats to the Assembly, and Hugh Carey was now governor, and Carey had apparently resolved the fiscal crisis of New York City in his first year. Steingut was contemplating pet projects for the new session, including a constitutional amendment to allow casino gambling. He also planned a "new approach" to the treatment of mental patients in group homes. "With little worry about losing the majority, and his title, Speaker Steingut [was] enjoying himself ... ."

But early in 1978 a primary challenger for Steingut's Assembly seat appeared—Helene Weinstein, supported by the New Way Democratic Club, a newly formed organization outside Madison Club influence, which operated out of a storefront and had only one elected official as member, insurgent Democrat Theodore Silverman. Andrew Stein, now Borough President of Manhattan, endorsed Weinstein against Steingut and began actively working for her in July, later saying that when he realized Steingut would not be indicted for the nursing home scandals, he "made up [his] mind to destroy him." And all the allegations concerning the Towers Nursing Home, and other scandals, again rose to the surface. Steingut would not go down easily, however. He attacked Weinstein's residency in court and on August 30, Ms. Weinstein was ruled off the ballot with seven days left before the primary. But the court did not rule against her petitions, only her residency, so with the court's approval, her father, Murray Weinstein, stepped in as a stand-in for his daughter. At the primary, in the race only for a week, Murray Weinstein stunned Steingut by defeating the Assembly Speaker and one-time Brooklyn boss. Steingut was already eligible for the general election, having received the endorsement and ballot line of the Liberal Party, and so made one final attempt to cut a deal. Steingut announced that he would get off the ballot only if he were appointed to a judgeship. Governor Carey, however, stayed out of the race, as did Esposito, now fully alienated from Steingut. But the Speaker campaigned ruthlessly, Weinstein calling him an "integrationist" in the areas of the district with high concentrations of Italian Americans, Lubavitcher Hasadim and other Orthodox Jewish communities. The United Federation of Teachers, still under the control of Albert Shanker, actively supported Steingut with pamphleting and phone work. Steingut also was supported by an ideologically diverse array of New York-based Democratic political figures (including United States Senator Daniel Patrick Moynihan, City Council President Carol Bellamy, former Manhattan Borough President Percy Sutton, Congresswoman Elizabeth Holtzman, Mayor Ed Koch, Bronx Borough President Robert Abrams and former Congressman Herman Badillo) alongside every major New York newspaper. Stein said that the campaign was one of "great nastiness, fought block by block, like nothing we ever see in Manhattan." On November 7, however, Weinstein, Murray this time, beat Steingut 10,297 to 9,079, a margin of a little more than 6% of all votes cast. Steingut's political career and the influence of the Madison Club were over.

== Legislative legacy ==
Despite the scandals and the allegations of self-dealing, Steingut's positions were often progressive and sometimes unpopular. This dichotomy accelerated throughout the early 1970s and into his speakership, when many of his direct constituents were lower middle class, proto-Trumpist white ethnics who had expressed their incipient disaffection by crossing party lines to vote for Richard Nixon in 1972 (directly presaging the broader Reagan Democrat milieu of the 1980s) or recent Black migrants—exemplified by sociologically distinct African American and Afro-Caribbean communities with frequently antipodean political motivations—who perceived Steingut as a distant and paternalistic figure who largely eschewed grassroots campaigning until his final race. During this period, he opposed the death penalty, worked on a bill to decriminalize possession of marijuana and fought for a range of child-protection and pro-consumer bills, including a generic drugs bill. He was the author of a law requiring the State to educate handicapped students. He also promoted a law that prohibited redlining. Although the power he ceded as Speaker seemed little enough, the fact that he gave up anything made him, in retrospect, "the father of the modern Legislature," according to Mel Miller, a subsequent Assembly Speaker, also from Brooklyn.

== After politics ==
After losing his Assembly seat, in January 1979 Governor Carey made a recess appointment of Steingut to serve as Chairman of the New York State Sports Authority, a position he retained for a year. He was also appointed (with his son Robert) to the advisory board to Governor Carey's Task Force on Domestic Violence.

Steingut continued to act as trustee for Touro College. He also resumed the practice of law, first as counsel to the firm of Baskin & Sears and later as the senior partner in the Manhattan law firm of Berger & Steingut.

Among the accolades he received were honorary degrees from his alma mater Union College and from Polytechnic University.

After long suffering from lung cancer, Steingut was admitted to Tisch Hospital on December 4, 1989, and died of pneumonia early on December 8.

== Family ==
Steingut married Madeline "Madi" Fellerman of Long Beach, New York on May 30, 1943, two weeks after she graduated from Russell Sage College. They had three children together: Robert Steingut, an investment banker, City Council member at large from Brooklyn and one time chairman of the New York Workers Compensation Board, born 1945; Theodore Seth Steingut, a lawyer in private practice in Manhattan, born 1949; and Ilene Steingut, an architect (and partner with her husband Giuseppe Vallifuoco in VPS Architetti), born 1954.

New York State Assembly
Preceded by Irwin Steingut	New York State Assembly; Kings County, 18th District; 1953–1965	Succeeded by district abolished
Preceded by new district	New York State Assembly; 44th District; 1966	Succeeded by Bertram L. Podell
Preceded by Leonard E. Yoswein	New York State Assembly; 41st District; 1967–1978	Succeeded by Murray Weinstein
Political offices
Preceded by Perry Duryea	Minority Leader in the New York State Assembly; 1969–1974	Succeeded by Perry Duryea
Preceded by Perry Duryea	Speaker of the New York State Assembly; 1975–1978	Succeeded by Stanley Fink
Party political offices
Preceded by Joseph T. Sharkey	Chairman of the Kings County Democratic Committee; 1962–1969	Succeeded by Meade Esposito
