= Diane Savino =

American politician (born 1963)

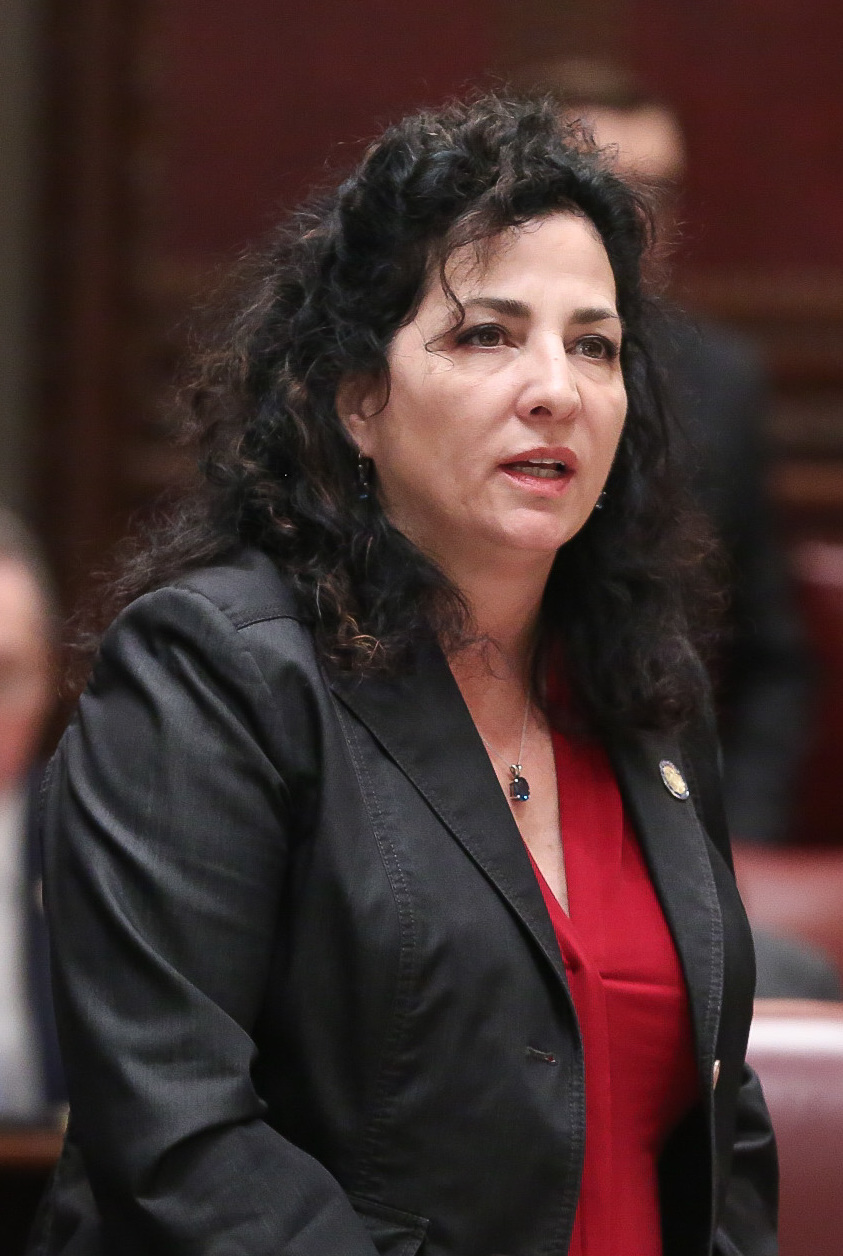

Senior Advisor to the Mayor of New York City
- In office January 3, 2023 – January 1, 2026
- Mayor: Eric Adams
- Preceded by: Eric Ulrich

Member of the New York State Senate from the 23rd district
- In office January 1, 2005 – December 31, 2022
- Preceded by: Seymour P. Lachman
- Succeeded by: Jessica Scarcella-Spanton

Personal details
- Born: September 28, 1963 (age 63) Queens, New York, U.S.
- Party: Democratic
- Other political affiliations: Independent Democratic Conference (2011–2018)
- Education: St. John's University (BA)
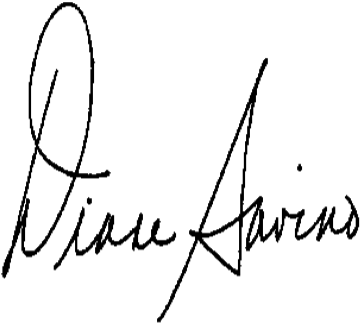
- Signature
- Website: Official website

Diane J. Savino (born September 28, 1963) is an American Democratic politician who represented the 23rd Senate District in the New York State Senate, in northern Staten Island and parts of southern Brooklyn, including Sunset Park, Bay Ridge, Bath Beach, Brighton Beach, and Coney Island. She served as a senior advisor to New York City Mayor Eric Adams.

From January 2011 to April 2018, Savino was a founding member of the Independent Democratic Conference, a group of eight Democratic state senators who formed a separate conference and allied themselves with Senate Republicans. Savino and her IDC colleagues rejoined the Senate Democratic Conference in April 2018. Savino was one of only two former members (David Carlucci) of the IDC that survived primary challenges in the 2018 New York Senate elections.

== Early life and career ==
Savino was born in Astoria, Queens and went on to graduate from Dominican Commercial High School. She has a psychology degree from St. John's University, as well as a degree in Industrial and Labor Relations from Cornell.

Prior to elected office, Savino began her career in public service as a caseworker for New York City's Administration for Children's Services, providing direct assistance to abused and neglected children. She was an active member of her local labor union, the Social Service Employees Union, Local 371, DC 37 of AFSCME, and became the Vice President for Political Action & Legislative Affairs.

== State Senate career ==
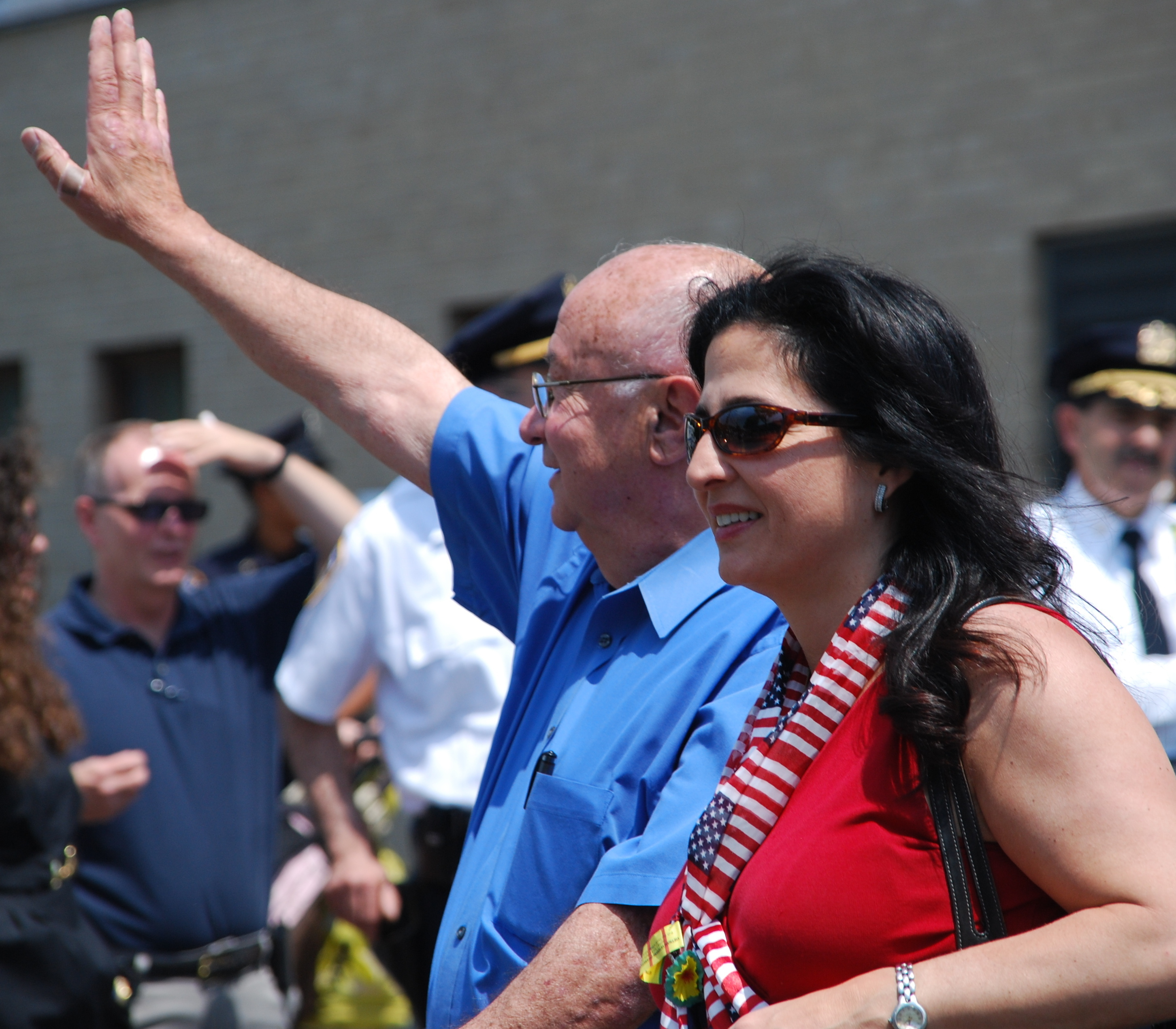
Diane Savino at the 2009 Memorial Day Parade, Staten Island. With Savino is Borough President James Molinaro.

In 2004, Savino was elected to represent the 23rd Senatorial District. She succeeded longtime Senator Seymour P. Lachman, who had retired.

On December 2, 2009, Savino voted for same-sex marriage legislation, which failed to pass the Senate. Her speech on same-sex marriage became popular on the Internet. The YouTube video was viewed by over 40,000 people (it went viral). Hundreds of people all across the world commented on the video. Subsequently, in 2011, the Marriage Equality Act passed the Senate and became law; Savino voted for this bill as well.

In 2011, Savino—together with Democratic Sens. Jeffrey D. Klein, David J. Valesky, and David Carlucci—formed the Independent Democratic Conference (IDC). The IDC caucused separately from the other State Senate Democrats; eventually, in December 2012, it entered into a power-sharing arrangement with Senate Republicans. When the Republican Conference won enough seats for outright control of the Senate in 2014, Savino and the rest of the IDC chose to remain aligned with them.

As a member of the IDC, Savino was provided with a stipend, known as a "lulu", worth $13,500 per year, that is designated by Legislative Law 5-1 for the Chair of the Senate Codes Committee. Senate Republicans named her Vice Chair of that committee, reserving the chairmanship for a Republican; in order to provide the stipend to Savino, payroll officials falsified state documents.

In 2014, medical marijuana was legalized in New York; Savino was the lead sponsor of the legislation. Savino has also sponsored proposed legislation that would legalize physician-assisted suicide.

Savino and her IDC colleagues rejoined the Senate Democratic Conference in April 2018. In the 2018 Democratic Primary, Savino defeated Jasmine Robinson, a legal secretary who had been endorsed by the progressive groups Citizen Action of New York and Our Revolution, by a 67-21% margin. Savino was one of only two former IDC members (along with David Carlucci) to win their primary races. In the 2018 general election, Savino defeated her Republican opponent, David Krainert, by a 69-28% margin.

In early 2022, Savino stated that she supported the creation of a new congressional district in Brooklyn which consists of Asian-American voting residential majority. As of January 2023, the new New York State Senate district that she represented includes the neighborhood of Red Hook. Other sections of her district in Brooklyn were removed.

== Post-Senate career ==
From January 2023 to January 2026, Savino worked for the administration of New York City mayor Eric L. Adams.

As a member of the New York City Charter Revision Commission, Savino opposed an Election Day 2025 ballot initiative to move local New York City elections to the Presidential Election year. She feared that attention would be diverted away from city elections if New York City residents voted to approve the ballot measure.

As of August 2026, Savino is the New York State Practice Director of a lobbying firm called Allied Government Affairs. Jeffrey D. Klein is the President of the firm.

== Electoral history ==
Election history
Office	Year	Election	Results
New York State Senate District	2004	General	√ Diane Savino (D) 63.03% Al Curtis(R) 36.97%
New York State Senate District	2008	General	√ Diane Savino (D) 78.61% Richard Thomas(R) 21.39%
New York State Senate District	2012	General	√ Diane Savino (D) 76.96% Lisa Grey(R)23.04%
New York State Senate District	2018	Primary Democratic	v Diane Savino (D) 67.4% Jasmine Robinson (D) 21.3%
New York State Senate District	2018	General	V Diane Savino (D) 69.0% David Krainert(R) 28.0%

== Personal life ==
As of 2018, Savino was in a long-term relationship with then-State Senator Jeffrey Klein. The Italian-American politician is known for her early to bed, early to rise lifestyle. As of 2011, she lives by herself in Staten Island and is a self-proclaimed "neurotic cleaner".

== See also ==
- 2009 New York State Senate leadership crisis

New York State Senate
Preceded by Seymour P. Lachman	New York State Senate, 23rd district 2005–2022	Succeeded by Jessica Scarcella-Spanton
Political offices
Preceded by Andrew Lanza	Chairperson of the Senate Committee on Civil Service and Pensions; 2009–2010	Succeeded by Bill Larkin
Preceded by Patrick Gallivan	Chairperson of the Senate Committee on Children & Families; 2011–2015	Succeeded by Tony Avella
Preceded by Hugh Farley	Chairperson of the Senate Committee on Banks; 2015–2019	Succeeded by James Sanders Jr.
