= Sam Sutton (politician) =

American politician

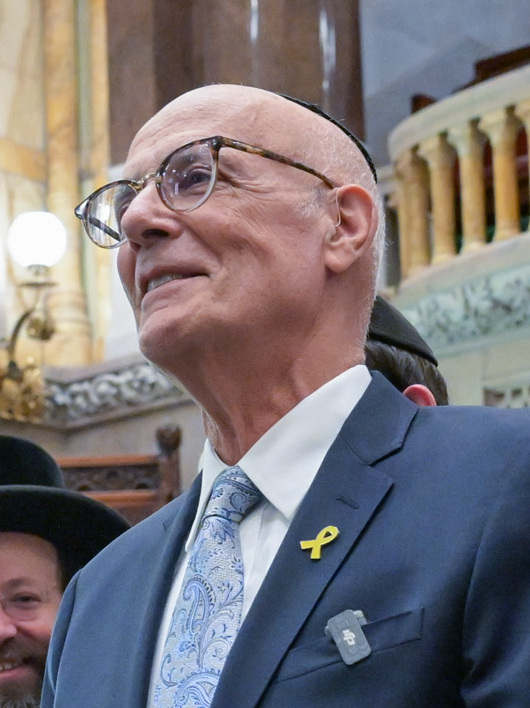
- Sutton in 2025

Member of the New York Senate from the 22nd district
- Incumbent
- Assumed office May 27, 2025
- Preceded by: Simcha Felder

Personal details
- Born: Solomon Sutton; August 14, 1949 (age 76) New York City, New York, U.S.
- Party: Democratic
- Website: State Senate website Campaign website

Solomon "Sam" Sutton (born August 14, 1949) is an American nonprofit executive and politician serving as a member of the New York State Senate from the 22nd district. A Democrat, he won a May 2025 special election to succeed Simcha Felder, who resigned after being elected to the New York City Council.

== Career ==
Sutton served with the Sephardic Bikur Holim, a social service organization, for 30 years. He has also worked for the Sephardic Community Federation, New York Cancer Center, the Safe Foundation, and is a former trustee of the CUNY Board of Trustees as well as of the NYU Langone Medical Center. He is also a co-founder and board chair of Teach NYS, a group advocating for funding to nonpublic schools such as yeshivas and Jewish day schools.

He previously ran a business importing women's accessories.

== New York State Senate ==
Following Simcha Felder's resignation to join the New York City Council, the Brooklyn Democratic Party chose Sutton as their nominee for the special election to fill the vacant seat. Although the district overwhelmingly voted for Republican president Donald Trump in the 2024 presidential election, it generally supports conservative and moderate Democrats at the local level, largely due to bloc voting from its Orthodox Jewish population. Sutton defeated Republican and Conservative candidate Nachman Carl Caller in the May 20, 2025, election, making him the first Sephardic Jew elected to the state senate.

He was sworn in on May 27, 2025. He was appointed chair of the Administrative Regulations Review Commission and is a member of the Aging, Disabilities, Education, Health, New York City Education, and Social Services committees.

== Personal life ==
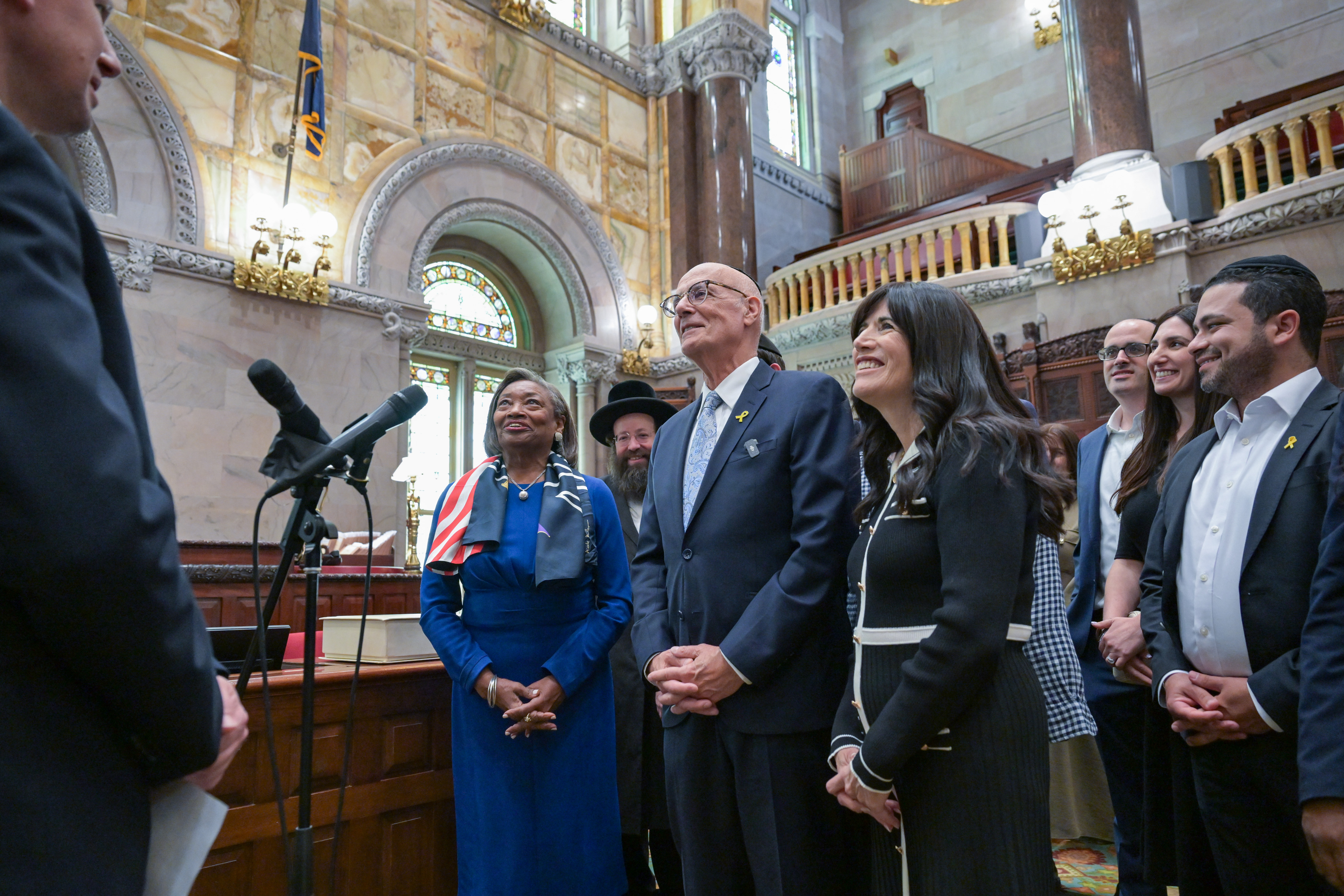
Sutton at his swearing-in on May 27, 2025.

Sutton is a Sephardic Jew and longtime community activist within New York's Sephardic community. He wears a kippah and keeps kosher.

== Electoral history ==
2025 New York Senate District 22 special election (unofficial results, >95% reporting)
Party	Candidate	Votes	%
Democratic	Sam Sutton	8,661	66.85%
Republican	Nachman Caller	3,640	28.10%
Conservative	Nachman Caller	517	3.99%
Total	Nachman Caller	4,157	32.09%
Write-in		138	1.07%
Total votes		12,956	100.00%
Turnout			~8%
Registered electors		155,468	
