= New York's 41st State Assembly district =

American legislative district

Assemblymember
Kalman Yeger; D–Borough Park

New York's 41st State Assembly district is one of the 150 districts in the New York State Assembly. It has been represented by Kalman Yeger since 2025, succeeding 44-year assemblywoman Helene Weinstein. In 2024, she announced that she would not seek re-election.

== Geography ==
=== 2010s-present ===
District 41 is located in Brooklyn, comprising the neighborhoods of Sheepshead Bay, Flatlands, parts of East Flatbush, Midwood and Canarsie.

The district overlaps (partially) with New York's 8th and 9th congressional districts, the 21st, 22nd and 23rd districts of the New York State Senate, and the 44th, 45th, 46th and 48th districts of the New York City Council.

== Recent election results ==
=== 2026 ===
2026 New York State Assembly election, District 41
Party	Candidate	Votes	%
Democratic	Kalman Yeger		
Republican	Kalman Yeger		
Conservative	Kalman Yeger		
Total	Kalman Yeger (incumbent)		
Write-in			
Total votes			100.0

=== 2024 ===
2024 New York State Assembly election, District 41
Primary election
Party	Candidate	Votes	%
Democratic	Kalman Yeger	2,790	70.5
Democratic	Adam Dweck	1,136	28.7
Write-in		34	0.8
Total votes		3,960	100
General election
Democratic	Kalman Yeger	19,061	
Republican	Kalman Yeger	16,305	
Conservative	Kalman Yeger	1,982	
Total	Kalman Yeger	37,348	99.1
Write-in		324	0.9
Total votes		37,693	100.0
Democratic hold			

=== 2022 ===
2022 New York State Assembly election, District 41
Party	Candidate	Votes	%
Democratic	Helene Weinstein	16,230	
Working Families	Helene Weinstein	1,671	
Total	Helene Weinstein (incumbent)	17,901	77.3
Conservative	Ramona Johnson	5,164	22.3
Write-in		99	0.4
Total votes		23,164	100.0
Democratic hold			

=== 2020 ===
2020 New York State Assembly election, District 41
Party	Candidate	Votes	%
Democratic	Helene Weinstein	25,679	
Working Families	Helene Weinstein	2,300	
Total	Helene Weinstein (incumbent)	27,979	64.6
Republican	Ramona Johnson	14,270	
Conservative	Ramona Johnson	993	
Total	Ramona Johnson	15,263	35.2
Write-in		63	0.2
Total votes		43,305	100.0
Democratic hold			

=== 2018 ===
2018 New York State Assembly election, District 41
Party	Candidate	Votes	%
Democratic	Helene Weinstein	21,228	
Working Families	Helene Weinstein	1,700	
Total	Helene Weinstein (incumbent)	22,928	99.2
Write-in		191	0.8
Total votes		23,119	100.0
Democratic hold			

=== 2016 ===
2016 New York State Assembly election, District 41
Party	Candidate	Votes	%
Democratic	Helene Weinstein	26,666	
Working Families	Helene Weinstein	1,650	
Total	Helene Weinstein (incumbent)	28,316	78.2
Republican	Ramona Johnson	6,650	
Conservative	Ramona Johnson	1,178	
Total	Ramona Johnson	7,828	21.6
Write-in		47	0.2
Total votes		36,191	100.0
Democratic hold			

=== 2014 ===
2014 New York State Assembly election, District 41
Party	Candidate	Votes	%
Democratic	Helene Weinstein	10,980	
Working Families	Helene Weinstein	1,109	
Total	Helene Weinstein (incumbent)	12,089	87.2
Conservative	Sura Yusim	1,740	12.6
Write-in		33	0.2
Total votes		13,862	100.0
Democratic hold			

=== 2012 ===
2012 New York State Assembly election, District 41
Party	Candidate	Votes	%
Democratic	Helene Weinstein	25,164	
Working Families	Helene Weinstein	1,093	
Total	Helene Weinstein (incumbent)	26,257	79.6
Republican	Joseph Hayon	5,737	
Conservative	Joseph Hayon	746	
Independence	Joseph Hayon	212	
Total	Joseph Hayon	6,695	20.3
Write-in		47	0.2
Total votes		32,969	100.0
Democratic hold			

=== 2010 ===
2010 New York State Assembly election, District 41
Party	Candidate	Votes	%
Democratic	Helene Weinstein	15,839	
Working Families	Helene Weinstein	870	
Total	Helene Weinstein (incumbent)	16,709	79.2
Republican	Alan Bellone	3,764	
Conservative	Alan Bellone	622	
Total	Alan Bellone	4,386	20.8
Write-in		11	0.0
Total votes		21,106	100.0
Democratic hold			

=== 2008 ===
2008 New York State Assembly election, District 41
Party	Candidate	Votes	%
Democratic	Helene Weinstein	24,808	
Working Families	Helene Weinstein	739	
Total	Helene Weinstein (incumbent)	25,547	83.8
Republican	Alan Bellone	4,421	
Conservative	Alan Bellone	519	
Total	Alan Bellone	4,940	16.2
Write-in		1	0.0
Total votes		30,488	100.0
Democratic hold			

=== 2006 ===
2006 New York State Assembly election, District 41
Party	Candidate	Votes	%
Democratic	Helene Weinstein	14,340	
Working Families	Helene Weinstein	698	
Total	Helene Weinstein (incumbent)	15,038	86.1
Republican	Jack Benton	1,967	11.3
Conservative	Jonathan Testaverde	461	2.6
Write-in		1	0.0
Total votes		17,467	100.0
Democratic hold			

=== 2004 ===
2004 New York State Assembly election, District 41
Party	Candidate	Votes	%
Democratic	Helene Weinstein	24,564	
Working Families	Helene Weinstein	839	
Total	Helene Weinstein (incumbent)	25,403	84.7
Republican	Mary Madden	4,096	
Conservative	Mary Madden	507	
Total	Mary Madden	4,603	15.3
Write-in		0	0.0
Total votes		30,006	100.0
Democratic hold			

=== 2002 ===
2002 New York State Assembly election, District 41
Party	Candidate	Votes	%
Democratic	Helene Weinstein	14,649	
Working Families	Helene Weinstein	467	
Total	Helene Weinstein (incumbent)	15,116	84.0
Republican	George Johnson	2,503	
Conservative	George Johnson	366	
Total	George Johnson	2,869	16.0
Write-in		2	0.0
Total votes		17,987	100.0
Democratic hold			

=== 2000 ===
2000 New York State Assembly election, District 41
Party	Candidate	Votes	%
Democratic	Helene Weinstein	26,503	
Liberal	Helene Weinstein	457	
Total	Helene Weinstein	26,960	97.1
Conservative	George Johnson	815	2.9
Write-in		0	0.0
Total votes		27,775	100.0
Democratic hold			

=== Federal results in Assembly District 41 ===
Year	Office	Results
2024	President	Trump 51.2 – 47.4%
2024	Senate	Gillibrand 52.0 - 47.1%
2022	Senate	Schumer 52.5 – 47.5%
2020	President	Biden 55.8 – 43.2%
2018	Senate	Gillibrand 61.2 – 38.8%
2016	President	Clinton 60.4 – 37.5%
2016	Senate	Schumer 78.8 – 21.2%
2012	President	Obama 64.2 – 34.8%
2012	Senate	Gillibrand 75.4 – 24.6%
