= David G. Greenfield =

American politician

David Greenfield
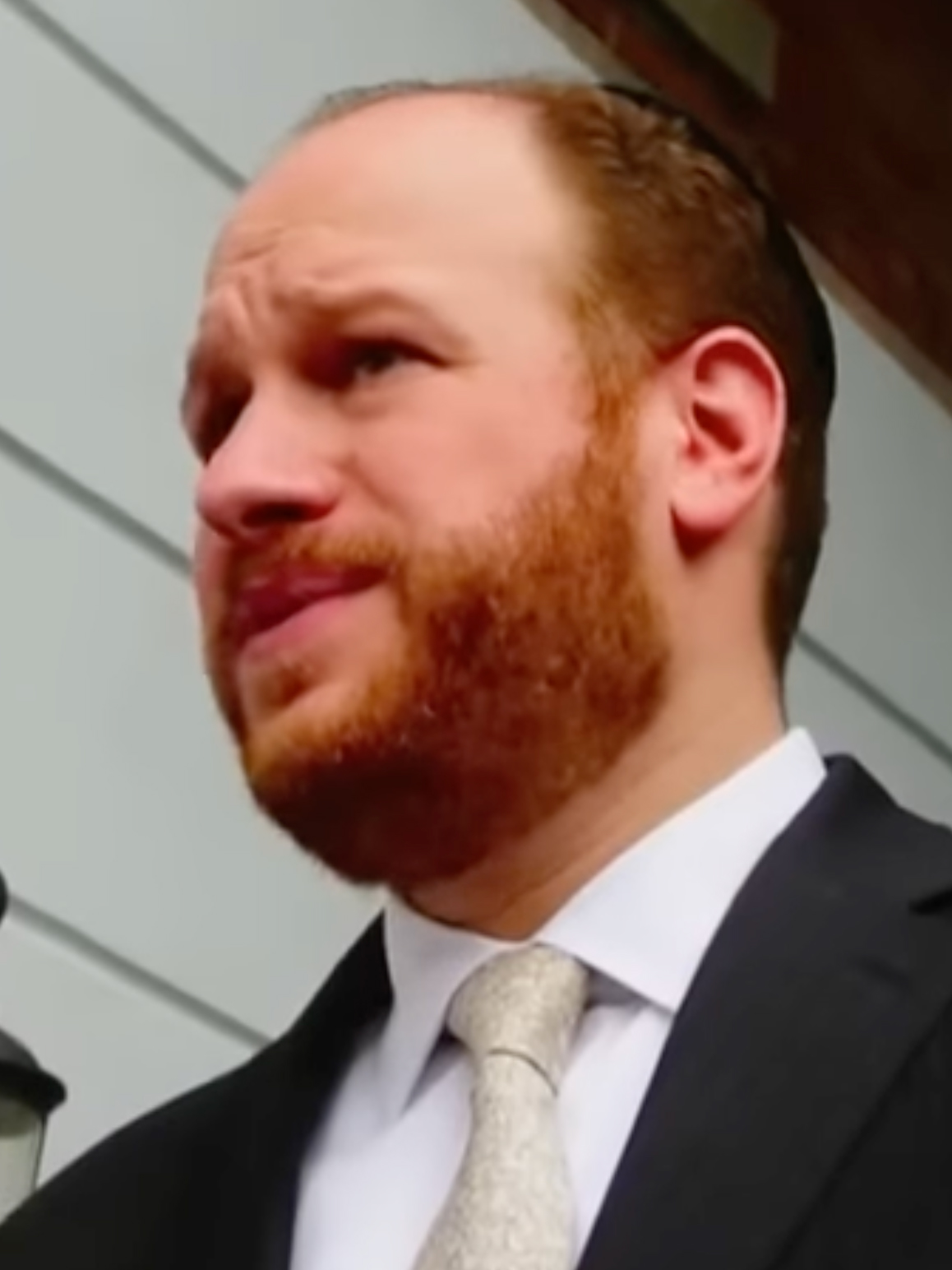
- Greenfield in 2013

Member of the New York City Council from the 44th district
- In office March 24, 2010 – December 31, 2017
- Preceded by: Simcha Felder
- Succeeded by: Kalman Yeger

Personal details
- Born: September 26, 1978 (age 48) Brooklyn, New York, U.S.
- Party: Democratic
- Spouse: Dina Greenfield
- Children: 3
- Education: Touro College (BS); Georgetown University (JD)

David G. Greenfield (born September 26, 1978) is an American politician, law professor, and non-profit executive. He served as a Democrat in the New York City Council from the 44th district from 2010 to 2017. In 2018, he became CEO of the Metropolitan Council on Jewish Poverty, a Jewish charity in New York City.

== Career ==
Greenfield practiced corporate law at Rosenman & Colin.

Greenfield is the founding director and counsel of TEACH NYS, and prior to his election served as the executive vice president of the Sephardic Community Federation.

As Director and Counsel of TEACH NYS, Greenfield organized statewide advocacy campaigns that resulted in private and public school parents receiving tax breaks and private schools receiving more government assistance. Greenfield served as deputy director of finance in Senator Joseph Lieberman's 2004 presidential campaign. Prior to that, he had a stint as chief of staff to Assemblyman Dov Hikind.

=== New York City Council ===
On January 7, 2010 Greenfield announced his candidacy on the Zev Brenner radio show to replace Simcha Felder in the 44th district, which included Bensonhurst, Borough Park, Gravesend, Kensington, Midwood, and Sheepshead Bay in Brooklyn. Felder announced his resignation after accepting the post as the new deputy comptroller for accounting and budget under John Liu. Greenfield received endorsements from U.S. Senator Joseph Lieberman, then-Mayor Michael R. Bloomberg, former Mayor Ed Koch, and State Senators Carl Kruger and Martin J. Golden. He received the support of council members Domenic Recchia, Lewis Fidler, Michael C. Nelson, and Vincent J. Gentile, as well as the backing of the Kings County Conservative Party, Democratic county leader Vito Lopez, and Citizens Union.

He was elected in his first term by his Brooklyn colleagues to co-chair the Brooklyn delegation and serve as their representative on the Budget Negotiating Team of the New York City Council. He later became the chair of the Land Use Committee of the New York City Council.

Greenfield is a frequent political commentator in The New York Times and The Wall Street Journal.

Greenfield was considered a political moderate in a liberal New York City Council. Greenfield authored a law that banned the Department of Sanitation from placing hard-to-remove stickers on vehicles that were parked on the wrong-side of the street. He co-authored a law that requires the Department of Education to notify parents and teachers about potentially harmful polychlorinated biphenyl (PCB) in classrooms. Greenfield also introduced a law that would stop New York City from towing cars for unpaid parking tickets and instead boot the car. Greenfield's proposed legislation was adopted by the New York City Council Department of Finance as a pilot program in June 2012. Greenfield was also the author of the Vision Zero legislation that lowers the default speed-limit in New York City to 25 miles per hour. This legislation is the lynchpin of Vision Zero and is widely considered to be the key strategy behind saving lives by reducing traffic accidents in New York City.

Greenfield was the only city council member who voted against a September 2010 bill requiring the New York City Clerks office to post on its website and distribute at its office information on where in the world (countries, jurisdictions, and US States) same-sex gay couples are able to legally get married.

Greenfield is a long-time advocate for increased government funding for public and non-public (including religious) schools.

Greenfield was ranked as the 51st most powerful New Yorker in City & State's Power 100 list in 2014. In 2021 he rose to the 14th spot on the list.

=== Met Council ===
In July 2017, he announced that he would not be seeking a third term on the city council, and would instead be taking over as CEO of the Metropolitan Council on Jewish Poverty. He began his tenure as CEO on January 1, 2018.

== Electoral history ==
Election history
Location	Year	Election	Results
NYC Council District 44	2010	Special	√ David Greenfield (D) 57.20% Joe Lazar (D) 40.18% Kenneth Rice (R) 2.62%
NYC Council District 44	2013	Democratic Primary	√ David Greenfield 90.44% Jacob Flusberg 9.56%
NYC Council District 44	2013	General	√ David Greenfield (D) 81.47% Joseph Hayon (R) 17.83%

== Personal life ==
Greenfield is Orthodox Jewish and is a member of the R' Landau's Synagogue in Midwood, Brooklyn. He is married with three children.

Political offices
Preceded by Simcha Felder	New York City Council, 44th district 2010-2017	Succeeded by Kalman Yeger
