= New York City's 44th City Council district =

- Boundaries following the 2020 census

Government
  - Councilmember: . Simcha Felder. D–Borough Park

Population (2010)
  - Total: 164,339

Demographics
  - White: 71%
  - Asian: 17%
  - Hispanic: 10%
  - Black: 1%
  - Other: 1%

Registration
  - Democratic: 54.5%
  - Republican: 20.3%
  - No party preference: 22.9%
- Registered voters (2021) 79,916

New York City's 44th City Council district is one of 51 districts in the New York City Council. It has been represented by Democrat Simcha Felder since a special election in 2025. He previously represented the district between 2002 and 2010.

== Geography ==
=== 2020s ===
District 44 is based in the heavily Orthodox Jewish neighborhoods of Borough Park and Midwood in southern Brooklyn. It also covers most of Gravesend and a small portion of Bensonhurst.

The district overlaps with Brooklyn Community Boards 11, 12, 14, and 15, and with New York's 8th, 9th, and 10th congressional districts. It also overlaps with the 17th and 22nd districts of the New York State Senate, and with the 41st, 44th, 45th, 47th, and 48th districts of the New York State Assembly.

=== 2010s ===
District 44 is based in the heavily Orthodox Jewish neighborhood of Borough Park in southwestern Brooklyn, also covering Ocean Parkway and parts of Bensonhurst and Midwood.

The district overlaps with Brooklyn Community Boards 11, 12, 14, and 15, and with New York's 9th, 10th, and 11th congressional districts. It also overlaps with the 17th and 22nd districts of the New York State Senate, and with the 44th, 45th, 47th, 48th, and 49th districts of the New York State Assembly.

== Members representing the district ==
Members	Party	Years served	Electoral history
District established January 1, 1992
Noach Dear (Borough Park)	Democratic	January 1, 1992 – December 31, 2001	Redistricted from the 32nd district and re-elected in 1991. Re-elected in 1993. Re-elected in 1997. Termed out.
Simcha Felder (Borough Park)	Democratic	January 1, 2002 – February 1, 2010	Elected in 2001. Re-elected in 2003. Re-elected in 2005. Retired to become Deputy Comptroller.
Vacant		February 1, 2010 – March 24, 2010	
David G. Greenfield (Midwood)	Democratic	March 24, 2010 – December 31, 2017	Elected to finish vacant term. Re-elected in 2010. Re-elected in 2013. Retired.
Kalman Yeger (Borough Park)	Democratic	January 1, 2018 – December 31, 2024	Elected in 2017. Re-elected in 2021. Re-elected in 2023. Resigned at the end of 2024 to serve in the New York State Assembly.
Vacant		January 1, 2025 – April 10, 2025	
Simcha Felder (Borough Park)	Democratic	April 10, 2025 – present	Elected to finish Yeger's term. Re-elected in 2025.

== Recent election results ==
=== 2025 general ===
2025 New York City Council election, District 44
Party	Candidate	Votes	%
Democratic	Simcha Felder	24,529	
Conservative	Simcha Felder	11,865	
Total	Simcha Felder (incumbent)	36,394	84.3
Republican	Heshy Tischler	6,046	
Trump MAGA	Heshy Tischler	569	
Total	Heshy Tischler	6,615	15.3
Write-in		159	0.4
Total votes		43,168	100.0
Democratic hold			

=== 2025 special ===
Following Kalman Yeger's resignation to serve in the New York State Assembly, a special election was triggered for this seat. Like all municipal special elections in New York City, the race is officially nonpartisan, with all candidates running on ballot lines of their own creation. Following Ballot Question 1's approval in 2019, special elections will also utilize ranked-choice voting.

2025 New York City Council special election, District 44
Party	Candidate	Votes	%
Simcha	Simcha Felder	4,624	81.7
Team Trump	Heshy Tischler	977	17.3
Write-in		55	1.0
Total votes		5,656	100.0

=== 2023 (redistricting) ===
Due to redistricting and the 2020 changes to the New York City Charter, councilmembers elected during the 2021 and 2023 City Council elections will serve two-year terms, with full four-year terms resuming after the 2025 New York City Council elections.

2023 New York City Council election, District 44
Primary election
Party	Candidate	Votes	%
Republican	Kalman Yeger (incumbent)	395	51.2
Republican	Heshy Tischler	365	47.3
Write-in		12	1.5
Total votes		772	100.0
General election
Republican	Kalman Yeger	3,936	
Democratic	Kalman Yeger	2,779	
Conservative	Kalman Yeger	785	
Total	Kalman Yeger (incumbent)	7,500	80.0
Borough Park Flatbush	Heshy Tischler	1,732	18.4
Write-in		148	1.6
Total votes		9,380	100.0
Democratic hold			

=== 2021 ===
An interactive map of District 44 until December 31, 2023

In 2019, voters in New York City approved Ballot Question 1, which implemented ranked-choice voting in all local elections. Under the new system, voters have the option to rank up to five candidates for every local office. Voters whose first-choice candidates fare poorly will have their votes redistributed to other candidates in their ranking until one candidate surpasses the 50 percent threshold. If one candidate surpasses 50 percent in first-choice votes, then ranked-choice tabulations will not occur.

2021 New York City Council election, District 44
Party	Candidate	Votes	%
Republican	Kalman Yeger	6,868	
Democratic	Kalman Yeger	4,514	
Conservative	Kalman Yeger	973	
Total	Kalman Yeger (incumbent)	12,355	97.8
Write-in		278	2.2
Total votes		12,633	100.0
Democratic hold			

=== 2017 ===
In 2017, Councilman David Greenfield left the Council in order to lead the Metropolitan Council on Jewish Poverty. Because his departure occurred after the filing deadline for his seat, local political leaders – among them Greenfield himself – could bypass a regular primary election and instead choose the Democratic nominee for the seat. The chosen candidate was Kalman Yeger, who had previously been set to run against Councilman Chaim Deutsch in a neighboring district. The process was roundly criticized by good government groups, and eventually drew an unsuccessful general election challenge from Yoni Hikind, the son of then-Assemblyman Dov Hikind.

2017 New York City Council election, District 44
Party	Candidate	Votes	%
Democratic	Kalman Yeger	8,277	
Conservative	Kalman Yeger	3,057	
Total	Kalman Yeger	11,334	66.9
Our Neighborhood	Yoni Hikind	4,854	28.6
School Choice	Heshy Tischler	670	4.0
Write-in		93	0.5
Total votes		16,951	100
Democratic hold			

=== 2013 ===
2013 New York City Council election, District 44
Primary election
Party	Candidate	Votes	%
Democratic	David Greenfield (incumbent)	6,688	90.4
Democratic	Jacob Flusberg	707	9.5
Write-in		6	0.1
Total votes		7,401	100
General election
Democratic	David Greenfield	11,494	
Conservative	David Greenfield	2,624	
Independence	David Greenfield	264	
Total	David Greenfield (incumbent)	14,382	81.5
Republican	Joseph Hayon	3,147	17.8
Write-in		125	0.7
Total votes		17,654	100
Democratic hold			
