= Jessica Scarcella-Spanton =

American politician

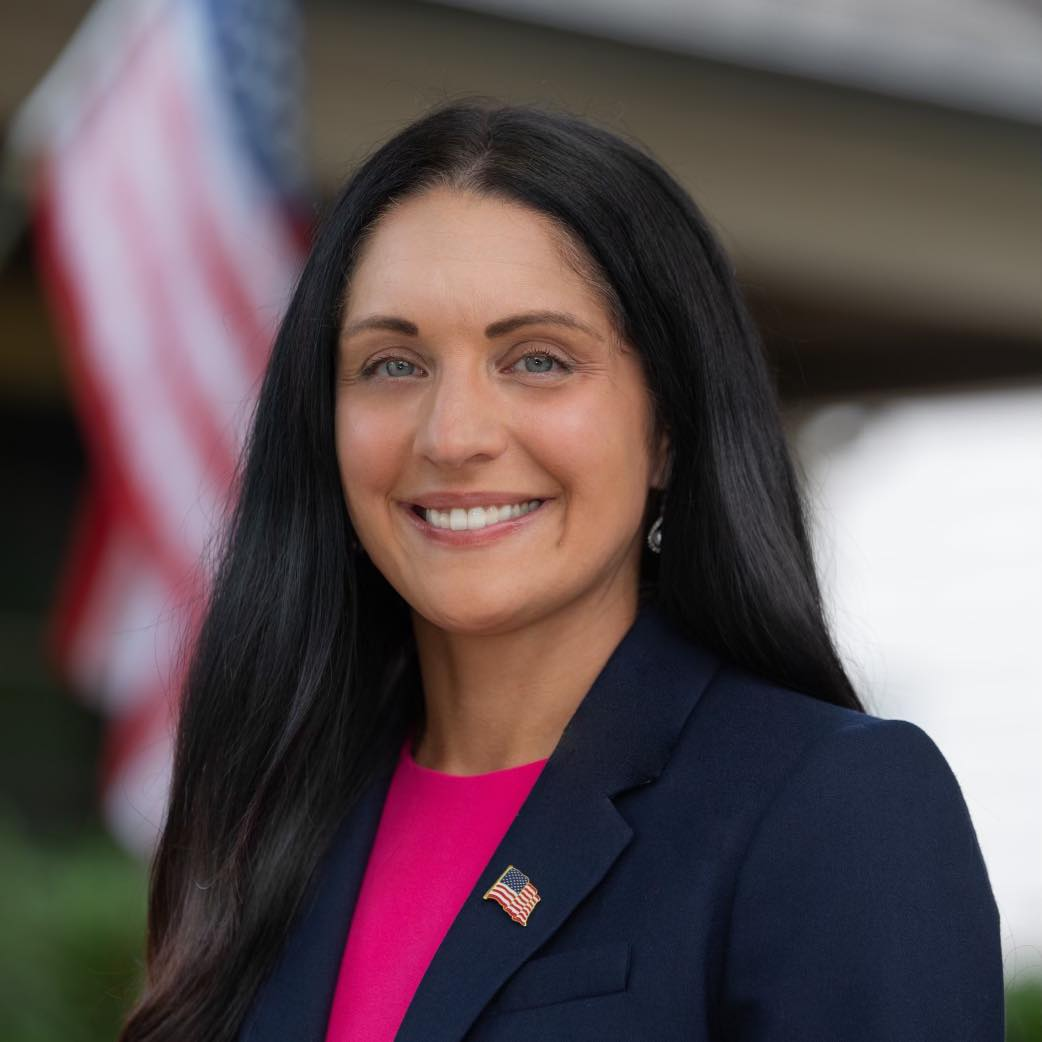

Member of the New York State Senate from the 23rd district
- Incumbent
- Assumed office January 1, 2023
- Preceded by: Diane Savino

Personal details
- Born: Staten Island, New York, U.S.
- Party: Democratic
- Education: College of Staten Island (BA)
- Website: State Senate website

Jessica Scarcella-Spanton is an American politician serving as a member of the New York State Senate for the 23rd district. A member of the Democratic Party, her district encompasses most of the North Shore of Staten Island, alongside parts of some southern Brooklyn neighborhoods.

== Early life and education ==
Scarcella-Spanton was born and raised in Staten Island. Both her parents were schoolteachers, and her father was a leader of the local chapter of the United Federation of Teachers. She attended the College of Staten Island from 2007 to 2011, where she obtained a Bachelor of Arts degree in political science.

Scarcella-Spanton is married to a US Army combat veteran, who served two tours in Afghanistan as a Infantryman and machine gunner. Her husband's active duty service took place from 2010-2015, deploying overseas in 2012 and 2014. Scarcella-Spanton and her husband have two children, who now currently reside in West Brighton, Staten Island, going to NYC public schools.

== Career ==
Scarcella-Spanton's involvement in politics began in 2009, when she was an intern for Janele Hyer-Spencer. The following year, she worked as a campaign aid for Hyer-Spencer during her reelection campaign. In 2012, Scarcella-Spanton worked as a deputy field coordinator for Democrat Mark Murphy's congressional campaign and as an executive director for the Democratic Committee of Richmond County.

In 2015, following her return to Staten Island, Scarcella-Spanton served as volunteer coordinator for the first election campaign of Richmond County District Attorney Michael McMahon. Beginning in 2017, Scarcella-Spanton was hired as director of operations for former State Senator Diane Savino. From 2021 to 2022, she served as assistant director of the Metropolitan Transportation Authority for community and government relations.

After Savino declared that she would not seek reelection, Scarcella-Spanton declared her intent to run for the seat, which also resulted in three other democratic candidates to run for the 23rd Senate District seat. On August 23rd, 2022, Scarcella-Spanton won handedly with 59.2% of the vote against three other Democratic candidates. On November 8, 2022, she defeated Republican candidate Joseph L. Tirone Jr in the general election. She was sworn in on January 5, 2023.

After being sworn in, Scarcella-Spanton assumed the position as Chair of Veterans, Homeland Security, and Military Affairs, which resulted in passing various bills benefiting New York veterans.

In October 2025, Scarcella-Spanton allocated seed funding through her position in the New York State Senate to create a mid-wife program at The City University of New York.

Scarcella-Spanton secured $250,000 in funding for CP Unlimited's Cora Hoffman Center on Forest Avenue in February 2026. The center serves the Staten Island residential community with a diversity of disabilities.

Scarcella-Spanton sought re-election in 2024 and on November 5, 2024, Scarcella-Spanton defeated her Republican opponent Marko Kepi in the general election with a wider margin than her previous election (winning with a +10 point spread). She was sworn in for her second term on January 8th, 2025. She will remain the Chair of Veterans, Homeland Security, and Military Affairs for session calendar years 2025 and 2026 (for her second term).

== Personal life ==
Scarella-Spanton has two children. Her husband Josh was serving in the United States military and deployed to Afghanistan.

== Electoral history ==
=== 2026 ===
2026 New York State Senate Democratic primary, District 23
Party	Candidate	Votes	%
Democratic	Jessica Scarcella-Spanton (incumbent)	6,793	72.6
Democratic	Omar Mohamad	2,524	27.0
Write-in		34	0.4
Total votes		9,351	100.0

2026 New York State Senate election, District 23
Party	Candidate	Votes	%
Democratic	Jessica Scarcella-Spanton (incumbent)		
Republican	Ruslan Shamal		
Conservative	Ruslan Shamal		
Total	Ruslan Shamal		
Write-in			
Total votes			100.0

=== 2024 ===
2024 New York State Senate election, District 23
Party	Candidate	Votes	%
Democratic	Jessica Scarcella-Spanton (incumbent)	47,737	55.0
Republican	Marko Kepi	38,701	44.6
Write-in		394	0.5
Total votes		86,832	100.0
Democratic hold			

=== 2022 ===
2022 New York State Senate Democratic primary, District 23
Party	Candidate	Votes	%
Democratic	Jessica Scarcella-Spanton	5,847	59.2
Democratic	Sarah Blas	1,622	16.4
Democratic	Bianca Rajpersaud	1,581	16.0
Democratic	Rajiv S. Gowda	764	7.7
Write-in		63	0.6
Total votes		9,877	100.0

2022 New York State Senate election, District 23
Party	Candidate	Votes	%
Democratic	Jessica Scarcella-Spanton	29,550	50.8
Republican	Joseph L. Tirone Jr.	26,799	46.1
Conservative	Joseph L. Tirone Jr.	1,702	2.9
Total	Joseph L. Tirone Jr.	28,501	49.0
Write-in		82	0.1
Total votes		58,133	100.0
Democratic hold			
