= Simcha Felder =

American politician

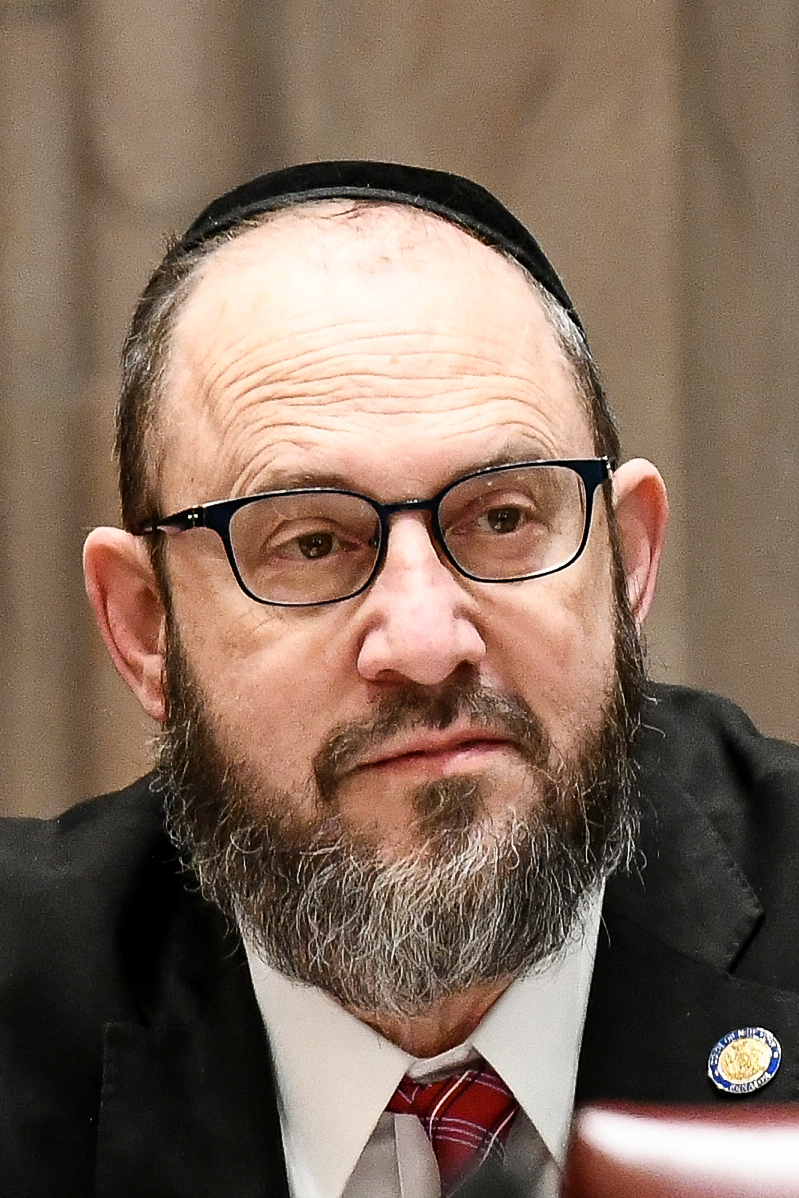
- Felder in 2019

Member of the New York City Council from the 44th district
- Incumbent
- Assumed office April 10, 2025
- Preceded by: Kalman Yeger
- In office January 1, 2002 – February 1, 2010
- Preceded by: Noach Dear
- Succeeded by: David G. Greenfield

Member of the New York State Senate
- In office January 1, 2013 – April 9, 2025
- Preceded by: Open seat (redistricted)
- Succeeded by: Sam Sutton
- Constituency: 17th district (2013–2023); 22nd district (2023–2025)

Personal details
- Party: Democratic
- Other political affiliations: Senate Republican Conference (2013–2019)
- Education: Touro University (BS); Baruch College (MBA)
- Website: City Council website

Simcha Felder is an American politician from the state of New York and a member of the New York City Council.

A Democrat, Felder represented the 44th district in the New York City Council from 2002 to 2010. He later served in the New York State Senate, representing the 17th district from 2013 to 2022 and the 22nd district from 2023 to 2025. In 2025, he returned to the City Council to represent District 44 once again.

In 2025, Felder was described by Spectrum News/New York 1 as "a revered long-serving politician in Brooklyn's Orthodox Jewish community". He is known for his advocacy for yeshivas, his willingness to caucus with Republicans (which has created consternation amongst other Democrats), and for his conservative record.

== Early life, education, and early career ==
Felder's father was Rabbi Harry Felder, spiritual leader of Beth Aaron Congregation in Borough Park. Felder is an Orthodox Jew. His brothers are Rabbi Shmuel Felder and Rabbi Chaim Moshe Felder.

Felder is a certified public accountant. He holds a bachelor's in accounting from Touro University and a master's degree in business administration from the Zicklin School of Business at Baruch College.

Felder has worked as a tax auditor for the New York City Department of Finance. In the 1990s, he worked for the New York City Comptroller's Office. Felder has also served as chief of staff to Democratic Assemblymember Dov Hikind.

== New York City Council (2002–2010) ==
Felder was elected to the New York City Council in District 44 in 2001. He was re-elected in 2005 and 2009.

During his tenure on the City Council, Felder gained popularity among his conservative Jewish constituents for advocating on their behalf and for supporting Israel. Although personally opposed to homosexuality as being against Orthodox Judaism, he backed Christine Quinn for City Council Speaker in what was seen as a political move to gain allies. Although Felder claimed to support Quinn, he said he could not actually vote for her because of religious reasons. When the time came to vote on Quinn's candidacy for Council Speaker, Felder took a trip to the restroom and did not cast a vote.

Felder backed city funding for religious schools, while maintaining that he opposed displays of religion in public schools. Felder has also gained attention by calling for better labeling of caffeine content in foods and beverages, as well as a ban on the distribution of unsolicited fliers. Felder also became known for his attempt to ban the feeding of pigeons in New York City.

In 2005, Felder crossed party lines to endorse then-Republican Mike Bloomberg in his bid for re-election as New York City mayor. Felder asserted that Bloomberg was the only Republican he had ever voted for, and implied that Bloomberg would be the only Republican he would ever support.

Felder was Chair of the council's Subcommittee on Landmarks, Public Siting, and Maritime uses in his first term. In January 2006, he became Chair of the Committee on Governmental Operations. As Chair of Governmental Operations, Felder supported Mayor Bloomberg's plan to curb Pay to Play contracting practices, and the Mayor's bid to extend term limits, so that the Mayor could run for a third term.

The committee also provided oversight of the City Board of Elections' implementation of the Help America Vote Act, and enacted legislation to transfer the Environmental Control Board from the Department of Environmental Protection to the Office of Administrative Trials and Hearings. The committee also enacted legislation to extend term limits from two terms to three. As a member of the council's Land Use Committee, Felder was part of a group of New York state legislators that has consistently blocked plans to renovate United Nations headquarters, calling the UN anti-American and anti-Israel. In spite of such calls, the UN announced in 2007 that it would undergo a $1 billion makeover.

In April 2006, Felder accused the highest-ranking uniformed member of the NYPD, Chief Joseph Esposito, of using inappropriate language when Esposito attempted to quell individuals who entered a police station during a riot in Borough Park. Felder indicated that he personally heard the chief say, "Get the fucking Jews out of here." The Civilian Complaint Review Board, which investigates police misconduct, later found the accusation against Esposito unsubstantiated, but did reprimand him for using profanity.

Felder resigned his City Council post in 2010 to take a position working for New York City Comptroller John Liu.

== New York State Senate (2013–2025) ==
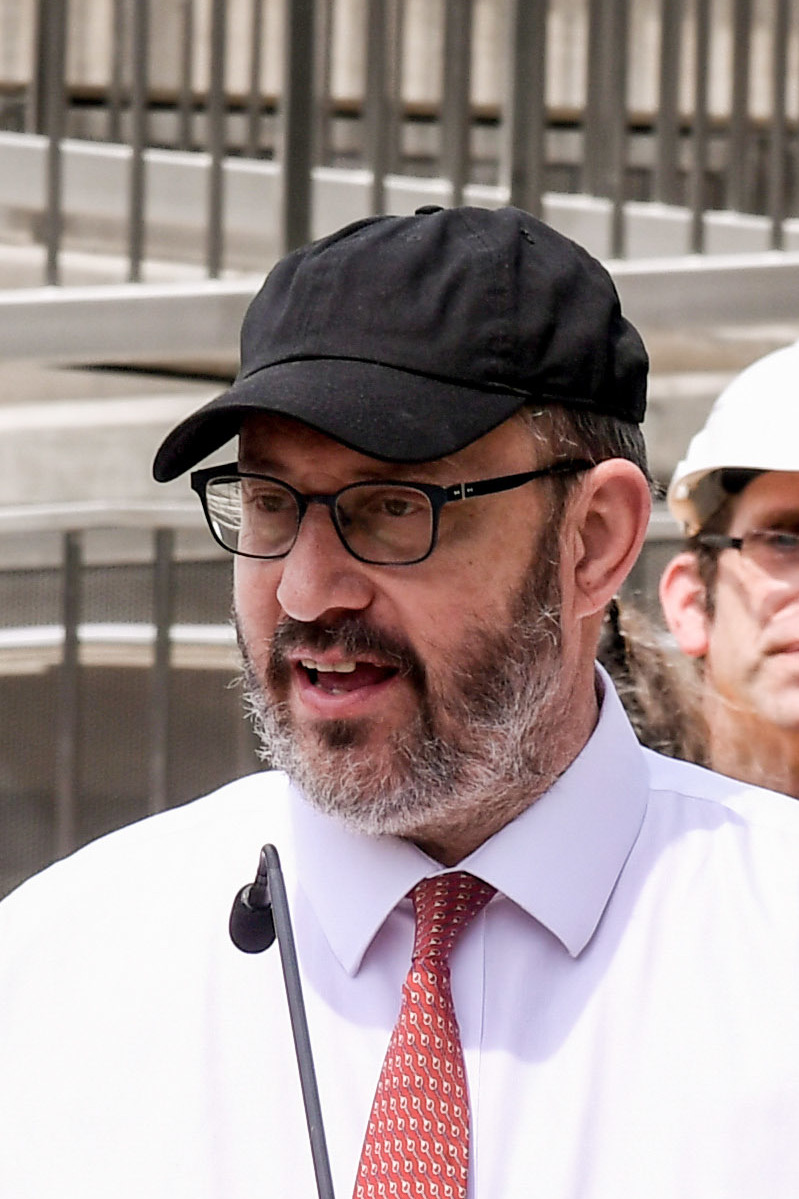
Felder speaking at a press conference in 2021

In 2008, Felder challenged incumbent State Senator Kevin Parker in a Democratic primary in Senate District 21. Parker won the primary with less than 50% of the vote.

Felder was elected to the New York State Senate in District 17 in November 2012. The district had been reconfigured as a "Super Jewish" district; reportedly, the Republican-controlled chamber drew the district specifically with Felder in mind. Even though incumbent David Storobin had won the seat in a special election, the GOP offered little support to him, and Felder handily defeated him.

Following his election to the Senate, Felder announced that, despite being elected as a Democrat, he intended to caucus with the Republicans. Felder also stated his willingness to return to the Senate Democratic Conference if doing so would benefit his district. Brooklyn Democratic Party Chairman Frank Seddio called Felder's defection a "disgrace and a complete betrayal of his constituents".

Felder is known as a conservative Democrat. As a State Senator, Felder was the only Democrat to vote against $15-per-hour minimum wage legislation. He cast deciding votes against an immigration bill called the New York Dream Act, stated that ending stop-and-frisk was a mistake, opposed plastic bag fees, and supported Iran divestment and anti-BDS laws. Felder opposes abortion. On the final day of the 2013 legislative session, Felder voted against a hostile amendment that would have attached a pro-choice bill to an unrelated piece of legislation; the measure failed by one vote.

Felder was re-elected to the Senate without opposition in 2014 and 2016. In the latter election, he ran on the Democratic, Republican, and Conservative lines.

Felder is known for his advocacy for yeshivas. In April 2018, other lawmakers accused Felder of "essentially holding the $168 billion budget hostage until the state agreed not to interfere with the curriculum at the private Jewish schools known as yeshivas".

After an April 2018 agreement returned the Independent Democratic Conference (a breakaway faction of Democrats) to the mainline Democratic conference, Felder became the swing vote in the State Senate; this placed a spotlight on his continued affiliation with Senate Republicans. On April 24, 2018, Felder announced that he intended to continue caucusing with Senate Republicans during the remaining weeks of the 2018 legislative session; Felder made this statement despite the possibility that two special elections being held that day could give the Democratic Party a numerical majority in the State Senate, and despite Governor Andrew Cuomo's public support for Democratic control of the Senate. On April 25, Cuomo sent Felder an open letter to pressure him to rejoin the Senate Democratic Conference. Felder continued to caucus with the Republicans.

In June 2018, Democratic State Committee members approved an informal resolution recommending Felder's ouster from the party. Former state Democratic Chairman Jay Jacobs, speaking to reporters afterward, reiterated the committee's exasperation with Felder. Jacobs said:

It's my belief is that the party is not merely a vessel for someone's personal ambition to take someone from where they are to where they want to be. The party represents certain principles. Here, you have someone who took the Democratic line, ran on it, won on it, and immediately stood with the Republicans.

In the 2018 Democratic primary in September 2018, Felder defeated Blake Morris, a lawyer. Felder won re-election on November 6, 2018.

The 2018 elections saw the Democrats win control of the State Senate for only the second time since World War II. Felder sought to rejoin the Senate Democratic Conference. However, on December 31, 2018, the Senate Democratic Conference announced that Felder would not be allowed to rejoin its ranks. Even without Felder, the Democrats had 39 Senate seats, seven more than the 32 needed for a majority. On January 9, 2019, the Daily News reported that Felder had decided against caucusing with the Republicans, and was looking forward to rejoining the Senate Democrats "'at the appropriate time'".

Felder was accepted into the Democratic caucus on July 1, 2019, after having voted with the Democrats on multiple major pieces of legislation.

In 2022, following redistricting, Felder - who represented New York's 17th Senate District - sought re-election in New York's 22nd Senate district. Felder won re-election in the 22nd Senate District in November 2022.

Felder's final day in the legislature was April 9, 2025. He stepped down from his Senate seat after being elected to the New York City Council. His farewell speech marked only the third time he had ever spoken on the Senate floor.

== New York City Council (2025–present) ==
Felder returned to the New York City Council in 2025.

Following the 2024 election of New York City Council member Kalman Yeger to the New York State Assembly, Felder announced his candidacy for Yeger's seat on the New York City Council representing District 44. Felder had held the same seat during his previous City Council tenure. On March 25, 2025, he won the seat with more than 81% of the vote.

In 2025, Felder was described by Spectrum News/New York 1 as "a revered long-serving politician in Brooklyn's Orthodox Jewish community".

== Personal life ==
Felder resides in Borough Park, Brooklyn. He and his wife, Elana, have four children.

== Electoral history ==
=== 2025 ===
2025 New York City's 44th City Council district special election
Party	Candidate	Votes	%
Simcha	Simcha Felder	4,625	81.8
Team Trump	Heshy Tischler	977	17.3
Write-in		55	1.0
Total votes		5,657	100.0
Democratic hold			

2025 New York City Council election, District 44
Party	Candidate	Votes	%
Democratic	Simcha Felder (Note: Shared with "Law & Order" ballot line.)	24,529	56.8
Conservative	Simcha Felder	11,865	27.5
Total	Simcha Felder (incumbent)	36,394	84.3
Republican	Heshy Tischler	6,046	14.0
Trump MAGA	Heshy Tischler	569	1.3
Total	Heshy Tischler	6,615	15.3
Write-in		159	0.4
Total votes		43,168	100.0
Democratic hold			

=== 2024 ===
2024 New York State Senate election, District 22
Party	Candidate	Votes	%
Republican	Simcha Felder	46,468	61.4
Democratic	Simcha Felder	21,959	29.0
Conservative	Simcha Felder	6,572	8.7
Total	Simcha Felder (incumbent)	74,999	99.1
Write-in		689	0.9
Total votes		75,688	100.0
Democratic hold			

=== 2022 ===
2022 New York State Senate election, District 22
Party	Candidate	Votes	%
Republican	Simcha Felder	39,234	62.7
Democratic	Simcha Felder	16,386	26.2
Conservative	Simcha Felder	3,914	6.3
Total	Simcha Felder (incumbent)	59,534	95.1
Working Families	Marva C. Brown	2,846	4.5
Write-in		242	0.4
Total votes		62,622	100.0
Democratic hold			

=== 2020 ===
2020 New York State Senate election, District 17
Party	Candidate	Votes	%
Republican	Simcha Felder	42,332	52.7
Democratic	Simcha Felder	31,476	39.2
Conservative	Simcha Felder	4,842	6.0
Total	Simcha Felder (incumbent)	78,650	97.8
Write-in		1,737	2.2
Total votes		80,387	100.0
Democratic hold			

=== 2018 ===
2018 New York State Senate Democratic primary, District 17
Party	Candidate	Votes	%
Democratic	Simcha Felder (incumbent)	15,589	65.4
Democratic	Blake Morris	8,200	34.4
Write-in		39	0.2
Total votes		23,828	100.0

2018 New York State Senate election, District 17
Party	Candidate	Votes	%
Democratic	Simcha Felder	20,585	41.8
Republican	Simcha Felder	18,152	36.8
Conservative	Simcha Felder	2,283	4.6
Independence	Simcha Felder	524	1.1
Total	Simcha Felder (incumbent)	41,544	84.3
Working Families	Jumaane D. Williams	6,611	13.4
Reform	Luis Rivera	733	1.5
Write-in		395	0.8
Total votes		49,283	100.0
Democratic hold			

=== 2016 ===
2016 New York State Senate election, District 17
Party	Candidate	Votes	%
Democratic	Simcha Felder	35,432	55.7
Republican	Simcha Felder	23,560	37.1
Conservative	Simcha Felder	4,010	6.3
Total	Simcha Felder (incumbent)	63,002	99.1
Write-in		575	0.9
Total votes		63,577	100.0
Democratic hold			

=== 2014 ===
2014 New York State Senate election, District 17
Party	Candidate	Votes	%
Democratic	Simcha Felder	21,384	71.7
Conservative	Simcha Felder	8,105	27.2
Total	Simcha Felder (incumbent)	29,489	98.8
Write-in		355	1.2
Total votes		29,844	100.0
Democratic hold			

=== 2012 ===
2012 New York State Senate Democratic primary, District 17
Party	Candidate	Votes	%
Democratic	Simcha Felder	6,643	81.5
Democratic	Abraham Tischler	1,427	17.5
Write-in		82	1.0
Total votes		8,152	100.0

2012 New York State Senate Conservative primary, District 17
Party	Candidate	Votes	%
Conservative	Simcha Felder (write-in)	113	53.6
Conservative	David Storobin (incumbent)	98	46.4
Total votes		211	100.0

2012 New York State Senate election, District 17
Party	Candidate	Votes	%
Democratic	Simcha Felder	32,759	55.3
Conservative	Simcha Felder	6,135	10.3
Tax Cuts Now	Simcha Felder	372	6.3
Total	Simcha Felder	39,266	66.2
Republican	David Storobin (incumbent)	19,338	32.6
School Choice	Abraham Tischler	528	0.9
Write-in		155	0.3
Total votes		59,287	100.0
Democratic gain from Republican			

=== 2009 ===
2009 New York City Council election, District 44
Party	Candidate	Votes	%
Democratic	Simcha Felder	8,889	48.8
Republican	Simcha Felder	7,754	42.6
Conservative	Simcha Felder	1,568	8.6
Total	Simcha Felder (incumbent)	18,211	99.9
Write-in		11	0.1
Total votes		18,222	100.0
Democratic hold			

=== 2008 ===
2008 New York State Senate Democratic primary, District 21
Party	Candidate	Votes	%
Democratic	Kevin S. Parker (incumbent)	10,006	51.7
Democratic	Simcha Felder	6,686	34.6
Democratic	Kendall Stewart	2,651	13.7
Write-in		2	0.0
Total votes		19,345	100.0

=== 2005 ===
2005 New York City Council election, District 44
Party	Candidate	Votes	%
Republican	Simcha Felder	8,352	54.1
Democratic	Simcha Felder	6,306	40.8
Conservative	Simcha Felder	781	5.1
Total	Simcha Felder (incumbent)	15,439	100.0
Write-in		1	0.0
Total votes		15,440	100.0
Democratic hold			

=== 2003 ===
2003 New York City Council election, District 44
Party	Candidate	Votes	%
Democratic	Simcha Felder	3,375	62.1
Republican	Simcha Felder	1,679	30.9
Conservative	Simcha Felder	382	7.0
Total	Simcha Felder (incumbent)	5,436	100.0
Write-in		2	0.0
Total votes		5,438	100.0
Democratic hold			

=== 2001 ===
2001 New York City Council Democratic primary, District 44
Party	Candidate	Votes	%
Democratic	Simcha Felder	5,172	43.4
Democratic	Robert J. Miller	3,906	32.8
Democratic	Samuel C. Spirgel	1,747	14.7
Democratic	Sandy Abby Aboulafia	1,082	9.1
Total votes		11,907	100.0

2001 New York City Council election, District 44
Party	Candidate	Votes	%
Democratic	Simcha Felder	13,592	78.9
Liberal	Robert J. Miller	2,542	14.8
Conservative	Samuel C. Spirgel	1,097	6.4
Total votes		17,231	100.0
Democratic hold			
