= Helene Weinstein =

American politician

- Weinstein speaking in 2021

Member of the New York State Assembly from the 41st district
- In office January 1, 1981 – December 31, 2024
- Preceded by: Murray Weinstein
- Succeeded by: Kalman Yeger

Personal details
- Born: September 6, 1952 (age 74) Brooklyn, New York, U.S.
- Party: Democratic
- Education: American University (B.A.); New England School of Law (J.D.)
- Website: Official website

Helene E. Weinstein (born September 6, 1952) is an American politician who represented District 41 in the New York State Assembly, which comprises Sheepshead Bay, Flatlands, East Flatbush, Midwood and Canarsie, in Brooklyn.

== Biography ==
First elected in 1980, Weinstein chaired the Assembly's Ways and Means Committee and was a member of the standing committees on Aging, Codes, Rules. She also chaired the Assembly Committee on Governmental Employees, Election Law and Judiciary, and the Assembly Task Force on Women's Issues earlier in her career.

Weinstein chaired the Assembly Standing Committee on Judiciary. She is the first woman in New York State's history to be appointed to this position. The Judiciary Committee presides over virtually all legislation affecting the state's judicial system, Family and Domestic Relations Law, Trusts and Estates, as well as civil practice in the courts. Weinstein sponsored major reforms in the state's jury system and is the leading proponent of ensuring civil legal services for low-income New Yorkers. Weinstein led the successful effort to increase 18B and Law Guardian rates. Weinstein was a member of the Court Facilities Capital Review Board during her time in the legislature

Weinstein has previously served as an appointee of former Governor Mario Cuomo to the New York State Child Support Commission and the Governor's Commission on Domestic Violence.

Over her political career since 1998, the two groups contributing the greatest amounts to her campaigns have been trial lawyers/lobbyists and public sector unions.

=== Education ===
Weinstein holds a B.A. in Economics from American University as well as a degree from the New England School of Law.

=== Occupation ===
Weinstein is of counsel to her family's personal-injury law firm, Weinstein, Chase, Messinger & Peters, P.C. She has been licensed to practice law in New York since 1977.

New York State Assembly
Preceded by Murray Weinstein	New York State Assembly; 41st District; 1981–2024	Succeeded by Kalman Yeger
