= Sephardic Bikur Holim =

Sephardic Bikur Holim, or SBH, is a non-profit social services organization that helps families who are in need by, among other things, helping people find jobs or helping people who need food. They have locations in both New York and New Jersey.

== Annual Top Gun Tournament ==
SBH holds an annual tournament called Top Gun to raise money. It is a place where people register to play Basketball, Volleyball, and Backgammon. They also hold raffles for several prizes such as iPods, TVs, and jewelry.

== Team SBH ==
Team SBH is composed of about 2,000 runners and spectators who participate in half marathons, full marathons, and 5k runs over the course of the year. Team SBH raises close to 1.5 million dollars annually benefiting our charity. One of our annual events is taking over 500 runners and spectators to Orlando, FL to participate in the Disney Princess Half Marathon. In February 2016, Team SBH will make our 6th appearance in the half marathon.
