= Metropolitan Council on Jewish Poverty =

New York City social services organization

Met Council
- Formation: 1972; 54 years ago
- Tax ID no.: 13-2738818
- Legal status: 501(c)(3) nonprofit organization
- Headquarters: New York City
- Services: Crisis intervention and family violence services; housing development fund; food program; career services; and home services.
- Chief Executive Officer: David G. Greenfield
- Co-Presidents President: Joseph Allerhand and Benjamin Tisch
- Chair: Richard Mack
- Revenue: $43,924,750 (2013)
- Expenses: $37,860,929 (2013)
- Employees: 200 (2018)
- Volunteers: 1400 (2017)
- Website: www.metcouncil.org

The Metropolitan Council on Jewish Poverty (Met Council) is a New York City-based non-profit social services organization. It offers many services to help hundreds of thousands of New Yorkers in need.

== History ==
The Metropolitan Council on Jewish Poverty, also known as Met Council, was founded in 1972 after two studies reported 300,000 Jewish New Yorkers were living in poverty. The organization, whose original full name was Metropolitan New York Coordinating Council on Jewish Poverty, was formed with the cooperation of "36 national and grass-roots Jewish organizations," including the American Jewish Congress and the Federation of Jewish Philanthropies of New York. Although founded to help the Jewish poor, today Met Council's services help all New Yorkers, regardless of age, sex, religion, race or ethnicity.

In 2012, a scandal sent the group, at the time one of the largest, most powerful charities in New York City and the biggest Jewish anti-poverty agency in the United States, to the brink of dissolution. At the time, the Met Council and its subsidiaries had a combined annual budget of $112 million.

Former New York State Assembly speaker Sheldon Silver's chief of staff was the wife of former Met Council CEO William Rapfogel who was arrested on charges of receiving $7 million in kickbacks over 21 years from the Met Council's insurance broker. Rapfogel was jailed, and Met Council was awarded restitution.

Earlier that year former Met Council executive director David Cohen and Herbert Friedman, chief financial officer, were arraigned in Manhattan Criminal Court on charges of grand larceny, money laundering, and conspiracy. They too were jailed.

To ensure that this never happens again, in 2015 the Met Council hired a former federal prosecutor as their chief compliance officer and general counsel.

One of New York's highest-profile Jewish leaders, Councilman David Greenfield, announced in July 2017 that he would not run for re-election in order to assume the leadership of the Met Council and restore its role as the central Jewish charity in New York. He joined the organization as CEO on January 1, 2018, and has already instituted new initiatives including a new digital food pantry initiative to serve the more than 200,000 New Yorkers that rely on Met Council's food distribution network. After Greenfield joined, the UJA-Federation announced that they were partnering with the Met Council on their newly announced $35 million initiative to combat poverty.

During the post-Passover Coronavirus pandemic, more than 1,000 Holocaust survivors benefited from a special program that focused on their specific needs.

== Mission and services ==
The Federal poverty guidelines, based on a standard developed in the 1960s, do not consider regional differences in the cost of housing, transportation, and taxes. Even so, New York City has a poverty rate of 20%, well above the 12% national average.

Met Council works to assist New Yorkers in need and raise awareness about the growing problem of Jewish poverty. The organization has eight main departments, each providing services that help New Yorkers who are struggling financially.

Examples include the crisis intervention department which aids clients going through job loss, eviction, utility turn-off, medical needs and other emergencies. Career services leads workshops on job searches, resume skills, and interview preparation and has training programs for careers in healthcare. Met Council has the largest kosher food pantry in the United States, and it opened three kosher soup kitchens in partnership with Masbia.

== Partner organizations ==
The Metropolitan Council on Jewish Poverty works with 25 local Jewish Community Councils and is affiliated with the UJA-Federation of New York. Met Council also partners with Food Bank For New York City, City Harvest and Masbia.

== Budgets and leadership ==
Both the budgets and the leadership of the organization have seen downturns and recoveries, yet funding for Passover meals (verified with photo ID) has been relatively constant. 88% - 92% of the money they distributed 2012 - 2018 was from grants and contributions.

Jack Simcha Cohen was their first executive director.
