= New York's 23rd State Senate district =

American legislative district

Senator
Jessica Scarcella-Spanton; D–North Shore
- Registration: 57.8% Democratic; 16.1% Republican; 22.1% No party preference
- Demographics: 44% White; 16% Black; 23% Hispanic; 14% Asian
- Population (2017): 314,851
- Registered voters: 182,354

New York's 23rd State Senate district is one of 63 districts in the New York State Senate. It has been represented by Democrat Jessica Scarcella-Spanton since 2023. Spanton has been an active member in New York politics and was a campaign manager for her predecessor Diane Savino, who represented the district from 2005 until her retirement in 2022.

== Geography ==
=== 2020s ===
District 23, following redistricting in 2020, largely resembles its composition in the 2010s. The Brooklyn portion of the district was altered to include Manhattan Beach and portions of Sheepshead Bay, and remove the portion of Sunset Park.

The district overlaps with New York's 8th and 11th congressional districts, the 41st, 45th, 46th, 61st, 63rd, and 64th districts of the New York State Assembly, and the 46th, 47th, 48th, 49th and 50th districts of the New York City Council.

=== 2010s ===
District 23 covers much of the North Shore of Staten Island, including the neighborhoods of Marines Harbor, Elm Park, West New Brighton, St. George, Stapleton Heights, Arrochar, and Dongan Hills. The district also encompasses parts of some southern Brooklyn neighborhoods, including Bensonhurst, Brighton Beach, Coney Island, Dyker Heights, Gravesend, and Sunset Park.

The district overlaps with New York's 7th, 8th, 9th, 10th, and 11th congressional districts, and with the 41st, 45th, 46th, 47th, 49th, 51st, 61st, 63rd, and 64th districts of the New York State Assembly.

== Recent election results ==
=== 2026 ===
2026 New York State Senate election, District 23
Primary election
Party	Candidate	Votes	%
Democratic	Jessica Scarcella-Spanton (incumbent)	6,793	72.6
Democratic	Omar Mohamad	2,524	27.0
Write-in		34	0.4
Total votes		9,351	100.0
General election
Democratic	Jessica Scarcella-Spanton		
Affordable & Safe	Jessica Scarcella-Spanton		
Total	Jessica Scarcella-Spanton (incumbent)		
Republican	Ruslan Shamal		
Conservative	Ruslan Shamal		
Total	Ruslan Shamal		
Write-in			
Total votes			100.0

=== 2024 ===
2024 New York State Senate election, District 23
Party	Candidate	Votes	%
Democratic	Jessica Scarcella-Spanton (incumbent)	47,737	55.0
Republican	Marko Kepi	38,701	44.6
Write-in		394	0.4
Total votes		86,832	100.0
Democratic hold			

=== 2022 ===
2022 New York State Senate election, District 23
Primary election
Party	Candidate	Votes	%
Democratic	Jessica Scarcella-Spanton	5,847	59.2
Democratic	Sarah Blas	1,622	16.4
Democratic	Bianca Rajpersaud	1,581	16.0
Democratic	Rajiv Gowda	764	7.7
Write-in		62	0.7
Total votes		9,876	100.0
Republican	Joseph Tirone Jr.	2,314	76.5
Republican	Sergey Fedorov	669	22.1
Write-in		41	1.4
Total votes		3,024	100.0
General election
Democratic	Jessica Scarcella-Spanton	29,550	50.9
Republican	Joseph Tirone Jr.	26,799	
Conservative	Joseph Tirone Jr.	1,702	
Total	Joseph Tirone Jr.	28,501	49.0
Write-in		75	0.1
Total votes		58,126	100.0
Democratic hold			

=== 2020 ===
2020 New York State Senate election, District 23
Primary election
Party	Candidate	Votes	%
Democratic	Diane Savino (incumbent)	12,496	73.4
Democratic	Rajiv Gowda	4,521	26.6
Write-in		175	1.0
Total votes		17,192	100.0
General election
Democratic	Diane Savino	62,116	
Independence	Diane Savino	1,432	
Total	Diane Savino (incumbent)	63,548	77.4
Conservative	Justin DeFillippo	17,336	21.1
SAM	John Jairo Rodriguez	1,031	1.3
Write-in		210	0.3
Total votes		82,125	100.0
Democratic hold			

=== 2018 ===
2018 New York State Senate election, District 23
Primary election
Party	Candidate	Votes	%
Democratic	Diane Savino (incumbent)	13,270	67.3
Democratic	Jasmine Robinson	4,015	20.4
Democratic	Brandon Stradford	2,363	12.0
Write-in		64	0.3
Total votes		19,712	100.0
Reform	Diane Savino (incumbent)	531	91.6
Write-in		49	8.4
Total votes		580	100.0
General election
Democratic	Diane Savino	43,429	
Independence	Diane Savino	1,019	
Women's Equality	Diane Savino	282	
Reform	Diane Savino	265	
Total	Diane Savino (incumbent)	44,995	68.9
Republican	David Krainert	16,861	
Conservative	David Krainert	1,223	
Total	David Krainert	18,084	27.7
Working Families	Jasmine Robinson	2,196	3.4
Write-in		68	0.1
Total votes		65,343	100.0
Democratic hold			

=== 2016 ===
2016 New York State Senate election, District 23
Party	Candidate	Votes	%
Democratic	Diane Savino	58,061	
Independence	Diane Savino	5,805	
Total	Diane Savino (incumbent)	63,866	99.5
Write-in		315	0.5
Total votes		64,181	100.0
Democratic hold			

=== 2014 ===
2014 New York State Senate election, District 23
Party	Candidate	Votes	%
Democratic	Diane Savino	24,835	
Independence	Diane Savino	2,891	
Total	Diane Savino (incumbent)	27,726	99.2
Write-in		236	0.8
Total votes		27,962	100.0
Democratic hold			

=== 2012 ===
2012 New York State Senate election, District 23
Party	Candidate	Votes	%
Democratic	Diane Savino	47,488	
Working Families	Diane Savino	2,126	
Independence	Diane Savino	941	
Total	Diane Savino (incumbent)	50,553	76.9
Republican	Lisa Grey	13,583	
Conservative	Lisa Grey	1,548	
Total	Lisa Grey	15,131	23.0
Write-in		46	0.1
Total votes		65,730	100.0
Democratic hold			

=== Federal results in District 23 ===
Year	Office	Results
2020	President	Biden 57.9 – 40.9%
2016	President	Clinton 61.1 – 36.4%
2012	President	Obama 68.5 – 30.5%
2012	Senate	Gillibrand 76.9 – 22.0%
