= Robert Jackson (New York politician) =

American politician

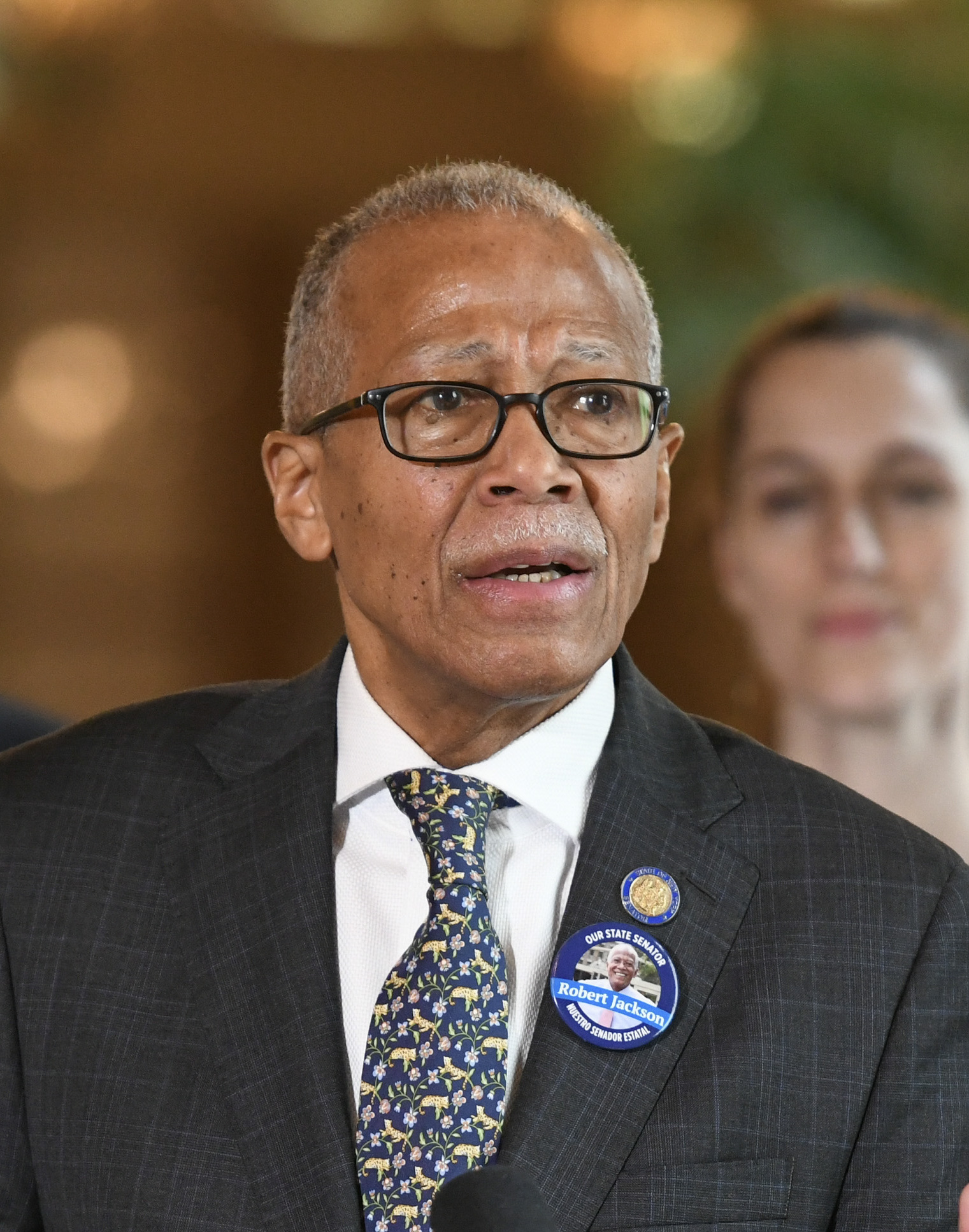
- Jackson in 2023

Member of the New York State Senate from the 31st district
- Incumbent
- Assumed office January 1, 2019
- Preceded by: Marisol Alcantara

Member of the New York City Council from the 7th district
- In office January 1, 2002 – December 31, 2013
- Preceded by: Stanley Michels
- Succeeded by: Mark Levine

Personal details
- Born: December 18, 1950 (age 75) New York City, New York, U.S.
- Party: Democratic
- Spouse: Faika Jackson
- Children: 3
- Education: State University of New York, New Paltz (BA)
- Website: State Senate website Campaign website

Robert Jackson (born December 18, 1950) is an American politician. A member of the Democratic Party, he represents District 31 in the New York State Senate. He previously served in the New York City Council from 2002 to 2013, representing the 7th district in Manhattan. He is the first Muslim New York State Senator.

== Early life and education ==
Robert Jackson was born in Harlem, the son of Zelma Jackson and Chinese immigrant Eddie Chu. He grew up in Manhattan and The Bronx, attending P.S.186 in Washington Heights, and P.S. 146, Junior High School 120, and Benjamin Franklin High School in The Bronx. As a child, he sold newspapers. Jackson graduated from the State University of New York at New Paltz in 1975. After college, he worked for the New York State Department of Labor and the Public Employees Federation, a labor union. In 1986, he was elected to New York City Community School Board 6.

== Campaign for Fiscal Equity ==
In 1992, Jackson was serving as the elected president of Community School Board 6. He sued the state, frustrated and accusing the state of under-funding New York City public schools. Jackson sought assistance from the school board's attorney, Michael A. Rebell; they founded the Campaign for Fiscal Equity, and in 1993 filed suit in CFE v. State of New York. The lawsuit argued that the State of New York's method of allocating funds for public education did not provide adequately for children in New York City, and therefore violated the New York State Constitution and the federal Civil Rights Act.

On June 26, 2003, the New York State Court of Appeals (the state's highest court) ruled in favor of plaintiffs, and gave the State until July 30, 2004, to implement changes. However, lawmakers could not agree on a formula. The Court of Appeals appointed a special panel to address the problem, and in 2005, the panel proposed that NY City schools receive an extra $5.6 billion per year. Justice Leland DeGrasse accepted that solution, and in 2007, the Legislature established the Foundation Aid Formula to distribute the requisite funds, phased in over a period of four years. Because of the subsequent fiscal crisis, funding was frozen during 2009–2012. Full funding has yet to be restored, a situation Jackson protested both in Albany and New York City.

== New York City Council ==
Jackson was elected to the New York City Council's 7th district in 2001 as a Democrat. Before it was redistricted in 2013, the district included portions of the neighborhoods Harlem, Washington Heights and Inwood. He served parts of his three terms as Education Committee Chair and co-chair of the Black, Latino and Asian Caucus with Council Member Fernando Cabrera. Jackson was twice re-elected before being term-limited in 2013.

Jackson is Muslim, and was the only Muslim City Council member during his tenure.

== 2013 Manhattan Borough President campaign ==
Jackson announced in late January 2013 that he was running in the Democratic Primary for Manhattan Borough President. Jackson highlighted the Campaign for Fiscal Equity as a significant accomplishment in at least five campaigns since he initially ran, and won a seat on, the New York City Council in 2001, and his literature stated Jackson "brought home billions of additional dollars each year to improve our public schools," though the Campaign for Fiscal Equity was called a failure by the Village Voice.

Jackson, who was the only male or black candidate in the race, received the endorsement of former mayor David Dinkins, New York City's first Black mayor, prior to announcing. His opponents in the Democratic Primary were former city council members Jessica Lappin and Gale Brewer, as well as small business owner and former Chair of Community Board 1, Julie Menin. Jackson lost the Democratic Primary election to Brewer, coming in third place with 19% of the vote, compared to Brewer's 40% and Lappin's 25%.

== New York State Senate ==
=== 2014 campaign ===
In 2014, Jackson for ran for the New York State Senate in the 31st State Senate district against the incumbent, Adriano Espaillat. In the September 2014 Democratic primary election, he lost with roughly 43% of the vote to Espaillat's 50%, and Luis Tejada's 7%, in a race described by the New York Daily News as "his second shot at a campaign in less than a year." Jackson's campaign manager, Michael Oliva, said that there were no specific plans moving forward, and quoted Jackson as saying he's "not going to deal with this bullshit for another two years."

=== 2016 campaign ===
In 2016, Espaillat ran for U.S. House of Representatives to replace retiring long-term Congressman Charlie Rangel of Harlem; Jackson ran for Espaillat's seat in State Senate District 31 once again. In a tight primary race, Jackson came in 3rd place with 30% of the vote, losing to District Leader Marisol Alcantara, Espaillat's chosen successor, with 33% of the vote, and Bloomberg administration alumnus Micah Lasher with 31% of the vote, while again defeating Luis Tejada with 5% of the vote.

=== 2018 campaign ===
In 2018, Jackson ran for State Senate District 31 for the third time. In the September 2018 Democratic primary election, he won with 56% of the vote, defeating Alcantara, the incumbent, with 39% of the vote, Tirso Pina with 4% of the vote and Thomas Leon with 1% of the vote. Jackson's victory was attributed to backlash against Alcantara, who in the State Senate had joined the Independent Democratic Conference, a group of Democratic senators who allied themselves with the Senate Republican Conference that controlled the chamber. Alcantara supported school choice, while Jackson was backed by the teachers' union. Jackson had the support of 2016 rival Micah Lasher.

In November 2018, Jackson easily won the general election in the heavily Democratic district with 89% of the vote, becoming the first Muslim state senator. In the Senate, Jackson is serving as Chairman of Committee on Cities.

=== 2020 campaign ===
In 2020, Jackson ran for re-election to the New York State Senate. In the June 23 Democratic primary, he defeated Tirso Santiago Pina with 84.0% of the vote, 30,443 to 5,653. Jackson then won the November 3 general election over Republican Melinda Crump with 88.4% of the vote, receiving 107,072 votes to Crump's 13,961.

=== 2022 campaign ===
In 2022, Jackson ran for re-election in the 31st State Senate district. In the August 23 Democratic primary, he defeated Angel Vasquez, Francesca Castellanos, and Ruben D. Vargas, winning 58.0% of the vote with 10,478 votes; Vasquez received 5,900 votes, Castellanos 896, and Vargas 733. In the November 8 general election, Jackson defeated Republican Donald Skinner with 85.1% of the vote, 42,110 to 7,277.

=== 2024 campaign ===
In 2024, Jackson again sought re-election to the New York State Senate. The Democratic primary was canceled, and he advanced to the general election. In the November 5 general election, Jackson won re-election with 99.3% of the vote, receiving 70,294 votes; write-in votes accounted for the remaining 476 votes.

== Controversies ==
=== Bill Thompson heckling ===
On February 1, 2013, a Democratic mayoral forum was held in Washington Heights. Elected officials repeatedly neglected to acknowledge City Councilman Jackson, who represented the area. Finally, when black mayoral candidate Bill Thompson greeted New York State Senator A. Espaillat, New York State Assemblywoman Gabriela Rosa, and New York City Councilman Ydanis Rodríguez, Jackson called out, "I'm not part of the Northern Manhattan team? ... Can you see? Hello? Am I black enough for you, brother?" Thompson responded that he had no intention of ignoring Jackson, and referred to him as a "hero" for his fight for NY City schools.

=== Fairway Market lawsuit ===
In February 2013 Jackson, and his wife Faika Jackson, sued Fairway Market and New York City. The Jacksons claimed Faika tripped over a downed stop sign in front of the Harlem location of the market in April 2010.

=== Climate change banner ===
Jackson and New York State Senator Rachel May received criticism in March 2022 after attending a rally organized by NY Renews, where they posed with a sign that compared climate change to the September 11 attacks. The sign used imagery that depicted a plane flying into the World Trade Center, with "climate change" captioned over the plane. Jackson was captured helping hold the sign up, and reading aloud from it. Jackson apologized for the incident, stating "the artwork depicted is wrong and I fully reject it."

== Personal life ==
Jackson has three daughters. He met his wife, Faika Jackson, while in college. He lives with his family in Washington Heights.
