= Eli Northrup =

Member-elect of the New York State Assembly from the 69th district
- Assuming office
- Succeeding: Micah Lasher

Personal details
- Party: Democratic
- Education: Cornell University (BA); New York University (JD)

Eli Northrup is an American lawyer and politician who is the Member-elect of the New York State Assembly for the 69th district.

Northrup won the Democratic primary against Rabbi Stephanie Ruskay on June 23, 2026. He was endorsed by Mayor of New York City Zohran Mamdani, Member of the United States House of Representatives from New York's 14th district Alexandria Ocasio-Cortez, and United States Senator from Vermont Bernie Sanders. He ran unopposed.

He is also a member of the hip hop group Pants Velour, which was established while he was a senior at Cornell University.
