= Edward C. Sullivan =

American politician and educator (born 1933)

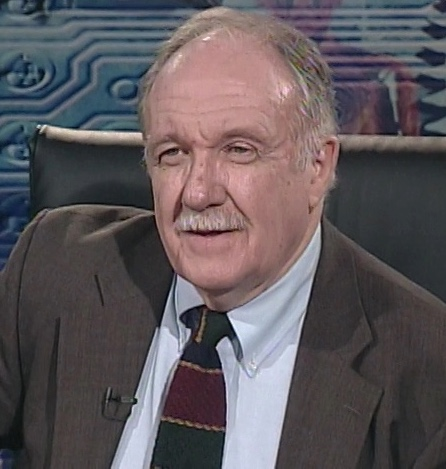
- Sullivan in 1999

Member of the New York State Assembly from the Manhattan district
- In office 1977 – December 31, 2001
- Preceded by: Marie M. Runyon
- Succeeded by: Daniel O'Donnell
- Constituency: 70th (1977–1982); 69th (1982–2001)

Personal details
- Born: Edward Christian Sullivan; 1933 (age 92–93)
- Party: Democratic
- Children: 2, including Nicole
- Education: Sorbonne University; The New School College of Performing Arts
- Occupation: Politician, educator

Edward Christian Sullivan (born 1933) is an American politician and educator. A Democrat, he was a member of the New York State Assembly from 1977 to 2001.

== Early life and education ==
Born in 1933, Sullivan moved to New York City in 1957. For his education, he studied at Sorbonne University and The New School College of Performing Arts, graduating from the latter in 1968. Fluent in French, he spent fifteen years teaching the English language at the City University of New York and New York University, among other schools.

== Politics ==
Sullivan is a Democrat. He was elected to the New York State Assembly after winning 26% of the vote in an election with seven candidates. He was a member of the New York State Assembly, serving from 1977 to December 31, 2001; he represented the 70th district from 1977 to 1982, and its 69th district from 1982 to 2001. From 1987, he was chairman of the Committee on Higher Education, and was also chairman on the Subcommittee on Libraries from at least 1982. He was also delegate to the 1988 Democratic National Convention. He retired from politics after completing his tenure in the State Assembly, saying it was the time.

Politically, Sullivan is a liberal. He supports the deprivatization and regulation of various services. He supports universal access to tertiary education, by which he advocated for the Higher Education Opportunity Program and heard university students as speakers in the State Assembly. In 1987, he sponsored a bill which would have extended the government oversight of housing for 15 years. In 2000, he sponsored a bill requiring those over the age of 14 to wear bicycle helmets. He also supports equality. In 1977, he became one of the first elected officials to criticize the New York City government for their decision to close Knickerbocker Hospital, calling the decision racist. In 1987, he advocated for racial equality among scholarship recipients.

== Personal life ==
Sullivan is married to businesswoman Madonna Rauscher. They have two daughters, including actress Nicole Sullivan. He is Catholic.

New York State Assembly
Preceded by Marie M. Runyon	New York State Assembly; 70th District; 1977–1982	Succeeded by Geraldine L. Daniels
Preceded by Jerrold Nadler	New York State Assembly; 69th District; 1983–2002	Succeeded by Daniel J. O'Donnell
