= Independent Democratic Conference =

Conservative caucus of the New York Democratic Party

- Conference leader: Jeffrey D. Klein
- Deputy conference leader: David Valesky
- Conference whip: David Carlucci
- Conference liaison to the executive branch: Diane Savino
- Assistant conference leader for policy and administration: Tony Avella
- Founded: January 5, 2011
- Dissolved: April 16, 2018
- Split from: Democratic Party of New York
- Merged into: Democratic Party of New York
- Ideology: Modern liberalism Conservatism
- Seats in the State Senate (at dissolution): 8 / 63

The Independent Democratic Conference (IDC) was a caucus consisting of several Democratic members of the New York State Senate that existed from 2011 to 2018. The IDC is notable for having formed a power-sharing arrangement with the Senate Republican Conference. At the time of its dissolution, the IDC had eight members: Jeff Klein, Marisol Alcantara, Tony Avella, David Carlucci, Jesse Hamilton, Jose Peralta, Diane Savino, and David Valesky. The IDC was led by Jeff Klein.

Klein, Savino, Valesky, and Carlucci formed the IDC in 2011 due to disagreements with John L. Sampson, the Democratic leader of the New York State Senate. The IDC allied itself with Senate Republicans throughout much of its existence. During the 2013–14 legislative session, the IDC and the Senate Republican Conference controlled the Senate jointly, as the Senate Republicans did not have sufficient numbers to form a governing majority on their own.

At the request of Democratic Governor Andrew Cuomo, who had previously supported the IDC, the IDC dissolved in April 2018. Following the IDC's dissolution, its members rejoined the Senate Democratic Conference and Klein became the Deputy Democratic Conference Leader. In the subsequent Democratic primaries in September 2018, six of the eight former IDC members were defeated; only Carlucci and Savino won their respective primary contests and were re-elected. Carlucci did not seek re-election in 2020, and Savino did not seek re-election in 2022.

== Background ==
The Democratic Party took control of the New York State Senate from the Republican Party in the November 2008 elections for the first time since 1964, winning 32 out of the chambers' 62 seats. However, four Democratic senators, Pedro Espada Jr., Rubén Díaz Sr., Carl Kruger, and Hiram Monserrate did not support the Democratic leader, Malcolm Smith. When the senators convened in the new session to elect a majority leader, Espada and Monserrate voted against Smith. Monserrate later rejoined the Democrats, leaving a deadlocked 31–31 Senate, causing the 2009 New York State Senate leadership crisis, which ended when Espada returned to the Democratic conference. Jeffrey D. Klein, who became the deputy majority leader after the 2008 elections, was charged with keeping Espada, Diaz, Kruger, and Monserrate in the Democratic coalition.

Republicans won control of the chamber in the November 2010 elections. In the fallout, Democrats replaced Klein as their chief strategist in December 2010. State Senator David Valesky feared that the Republican leadership and the independent redistricting committee was going to gerrymander his district in upstate New York to weaken his supporters' voting ability in the 2013 State Senate election. Klein stepped down as deputy minority leader in January 2011, citing disagreements with John L. Sampson, the Minority Leader of the State Senate.

== Conference history ==
=== Creation and forming a coalition ===
The conference upon forming a coalition in 2012. Majority: Republicans (30) Independent Democratic Conference (4) Non-Conference Democrat in Majority (1) Minority: Democrats (28)

On January 5, 2011, Klein, along with three other Democratic senators (Diane Savino, David Valesky, and David Carlucci), announced the formation of a caucus within the state senate called the Independent Democratic Conference. The four senators indicated that they no longer approved of Sampson's leadership. Klein claimed that, unlike the Democrats who left the conference in the 2009 leadership crisis, the IDC was concerned with legislation that a Democratic majority did not pass, such as marriage equality. As the majority and minority leaders gave out committee assignments, the IDC was disappointed when Sampson offered the IDC members minor roles on committees. Klein reached out to Dean Skelos, the Republican leader, and Skelos agreed to give the four members chairmanships of standing committees.

In the November 2012 elections, Democrats won a majority of seats in the State Senate. Following the election, the IDC formed a bipartisan coalition with the Senate Republican Conference that enabled the two conferences to control the Senate despite the Democrats' numerical majority. Under their power-sharing arrangement, the IDC and the Senate Republicans agreed to "decide what bills [would] reach the Senate floor each day of the session", would "dole out committee assignments", would "have the power to make appointments to state and local boards", and would "share negotiations over the state budget". Klein and Skelos also agreed that the title of Senate President would shift back and forth between the two of them every two weeks. Additionally, Simcha Felder, a Democratic senator-elect, announced he would caucus with the Republicans.

In December 2012, the IDC recruited Malcolm Smith to join its ranks. This move was part of a failed attempt by Smith to secure the Republican Party nomination in the New York City mayoral election; Smith was indicted on federal corruption charges, which led to his expulsion from the IDC on April 14, 2013, and his eventual conviction. On February 26, 2014, Tony Avella left the Senate Democratic Conference to join the IDC.

Governor Andrew Cuomo was actively involved in the formation of the conference, encouraging it to maintain Republican leadership of the chamber and providing tactical advice in order to keep more liberal New York City Democrats out of power.

=== Growth and fights with mainline Democrats ===
The conference at peak membership in December 2017. Majority: Republicans (31) Independent Democratic Conference (8) Non-Conference Democrat in Majority (1) Minority: Democrats (23)

Liberal activists working with the Democratic Party and the Working Families Party targeted Klein and Avella during the Democratic primary elections in September 2014, with Oliver Koppell challenging Klein and John Liu challenging Avella. Due to pressure from Governor Andrew Cuomo and labor unions, Klein indicated in June 2014 that the IDC would rejoin the Democratic caucus after the November 2014 elections. Still, the IDC supported Betty Jean Grant's unsuccessful primary challenge against Timothy M. Kennedy because of Grant's pro-choice political stance. Klein and Avella won their respective primaries.

In the 2014 general election, Republicans won back the majority. The election results meant that Klein lost his position as co-leader, with Skelos taking over as the Senate Majority Leader and Temporary President of the Senate and regaining sole control over which bills would reach the Senate floor. Though the new Democratic leader, Andrea Stewart-Cousins, held discussions with Klein about the IDC rejoining the Democrats, the IDC members decided to remain allied with the Republicans in the 2015 legislative session despite their conference's diminished role.

During the 2015 session, the IDC successfully pushed the Republicans to include paid family leave and a $15 per hour minimum wage in the state budget. Klein also pushed for more funding to the New York City Housing Authority, and obtained $100 million. During Skelos' 2015 trial for corruption, a wiretapped conversation was played where Skelos argued that the Republicans' power sharing agreement gave the IDC no real power and it would serve to hinder Democrats by keeping them divided. Klein indicated that this recording would not change the IDC agreement with Republicans.

After some of its members faced primary challenges in 2014, the IDC formed its own campaign committee through an agreement with the Independence Party of New York. Heading into the November 2016 elections, Klein would not commit to rejoining the Senate Democratic Conference. After the elections, newly elected senator Marisol Alcantara and second-term senator Jesse Hamilton joined the IDC. Despite pressure from liberal activists to unite the 24 mainstream Democrats with the IDC and Felder to form a 32-member majority, and despite attempts by Stewart-Cousins to involve Cuomo in the situation, the IDC and Felder continued their relationships with the 31 Senate Republicans, giving Republicans the majority in the 2017 legislative session. In January 2017, Jose Peralta joined the IDC.

==== Calls for reunification ====
Following the election of Donald Trump as President of the United States in November 2016, the Senate Democratic Conference and grassroots activists (including members of Rise and Resist and several Indivisible groups) stepped up their criticism of the IDC for splitting the Democratic vote in the State Senate and enabling Republicans to maintain control of the chamber.

In early May 2017, media reports revealed that members of the IDC--among them Savino and Peralta--received stipends normally reserved only for committee chairs. It later emerged that the stipends were made possible through the actions of staff who falsely listed the members of the IDC as committee chairs. The scandal was investigated by the New York Attorney General's Office and the U.S. Attorney for Brooklyn. At the time, the members of the IDC continued to refuse attempts by the Democratic Party to have the conference join with the "mainstream" Democratic Conference completely or in a coalition. On May 24, 2017, Felder urged the IDC to rejoin the mainline Democrats, and suggested that he might rejoin the Democratic Conference as well.

=== Dissolution ===
The New York Senate following the dissolution of the Independent Democratic Conference in April 2018. Majority: Republicans (31) Non-Conference Democrat in Majority (1) Minority: Democrats (31)

On April 4, 2018, the IDC announced that it would dissolve, that its members would rejoin the Senate Democratic Conference, and that Klein would become the Deputy Democratic Conference Leader. The announcement followed a meeting called by Governor Andrew Cuomo at which Cuomo requested that the IDC reunite with the Senate Democratic Conference. On April 16, the IDC was dissolved.

Following the dissolution of the IDC, Avella, Alcantara, Carlucci and Hamilton were all stripped of their committee chairships by Senate Majority Leader John J. Flanagan. In addition, 39 IDC staffers were laid off, and Klein was required to move out of his office suite and relinquish his state vehicle. Despite their return to the Senate Democratic Conference, all eight former members of the IDC faced challengers in the 2018 Democratic primaries.

In June 2018, a trial court judge found the IDC's fundraising arrangement with the Independence Party illegal. On July 20, 2018, the New York State Board of Elections directed the eight former members of the IDC to return all contributions they had received from the Senate Independence Campaign Committee.

==== 2018 State Senate elections ====
In the Democratic Party primary elections held on September 13, 2018, all eight former members of the IDC at the time of its dissolution faced challengers. Six were defeated: John Liu defeated Avella, Robert Jackson defeated Alcantara, Alessandra Biaggi defeated Klein, Jessica Ramos defeated Peralta, Zellnor Myrie defeated Hamilton, and Rachel May defeated Valesky. Carlucci and Savino won their respective primaries.

As part of New York's electoral fusion laws allowing candidates to run on multiple ballot lines in an election, each of the six defeated IDC candidates appeared on the ballot for the November general election on at least one third-party line. All six were endorsed by the Independence Party of New York; Avella, Valesky, Hamilton and Peralta were endorsed by the Women's Equality Party of New York, and Peralta was endorsed by the Reform Party of New York State. However, most of the six defeated senators suspended their reelection campaigns after the primary election; Avella was the only one to announce that he would continue to run in the general election. Although Avella appeared on the Women's Equality Party ballot line in the general election, the party--which had been created by Governor Cuomo--announced that it was supporting Liu (the victor in the Democratic primary) instead. In the November general election, all six candidates who had defeated IDC candidates in the Democratic primaries were victorious; however, Carlucci and Savino were reelected.

2018 Democratic Primary Results for Former IDC Senators
District	Incumbent Candidate	Primary Challenger(s)	Results
District 11	Tony Avella	John Liu	Liu: 52.3% Avella: 47.7% Challenger win
District 13	Jose Peralta	Jessica Ramos	Ramos: 54.8% Peralta: 45.2% Challenger win
District 20	Jesse Hamilton	Zellnor Myrie	Myrie: 54.0% Hamilton: 46.0% Challenger win
District 23	Diane Savino	Jasmine Robinson Brandon Stradford	Savino: 67.5% Robinson: 20.4% Stradford: 12.1% Incumbent win
District 31	Marisol Alcantara	Robert Jackson Tirso Santiago Pina Thomas Leon	Jackson: 56.2% Alcantara: 38.3% Santiago Pina: 4.0% Leon: 1.5% Challenger win
District 34	Jeffrey D. Klein	Alessandra Biaggi	Biaggi: 54.3% Klein: 45.7% Challenger win
District 38	David Carlucci	Julie Goldberg	Carlucci: 53.9% Goldberg: 46.1% Incumbent win
District 53	David Valesky	Rachel May	May: 51.8% Valesky: 48.2% Challenger win

=== After 2018 ===
In 2020, Carlucci opted not to seek re-election to the senate and instead ran to succeed the retiring Nita Lowey as the U.S. representative for New York's 17th congressional district. He attacked the other candidates running, accusing them of being carpetbaggers. Carlucci was felt to be a formidable candidate, as he was considered to have a lock on support from voters west of the Hudson River, which bisects the district. However, his past association with the IDC earned him the enmity of both progressive and more moderate Democrats. Pro-choice groups devoted money and resources to opposing his bid, as during his period in the state senate he had helped block pro-abortion legislation. Carlucci's campaign began to falter as time went on, suffering from poor fundraising and a lack of prominent endorsements, and he finished fourth in the Democratic primary.

As of 2020, Marisol Alcantara was the director of the Lower Hudson Valley's New York State Nurses Association and David Valesky was the deputy director of the New York State Department of Agriculture and Markets Jesse Hamilton lost a 2020 bid for the New York State Assembly against incumbent Diana Richardson in the Democratic Party primary.

In 2022, Tony Avella ran for the New York City Council to succeed retiring Democrat Paul Vallone. He won the Democratic primary, but lost the general election to Republican Vickie Paladino.

Diane Savino, the last remaining former IDC member in the State Senate, did not seek re-election in 2022.

== Membership ==
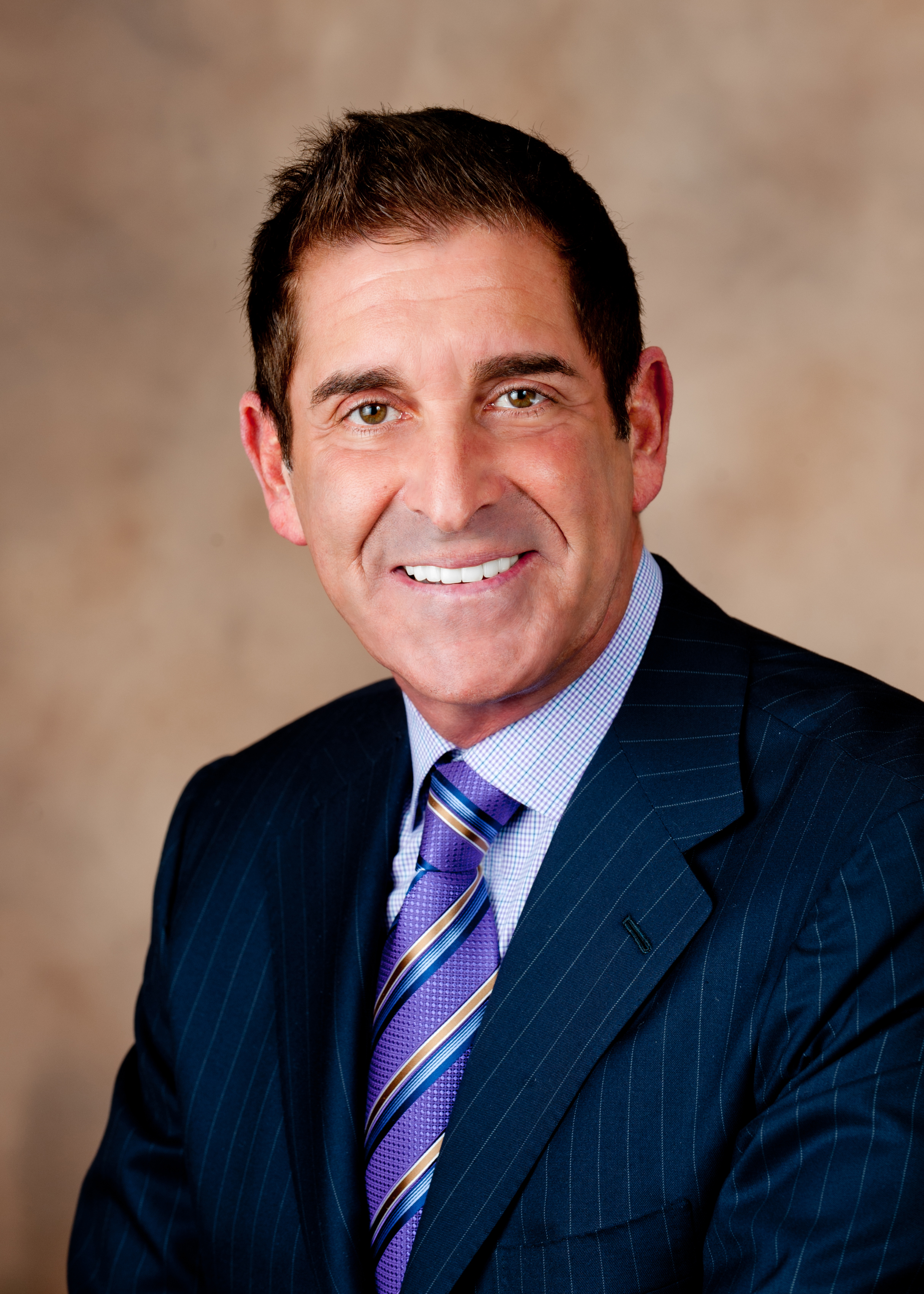
Jeffrey D. Klein

- Jeffrey D. Klein (2011–2018), Independent Democratic Conference Leader & Majority Coalition Leader, founding member
- David Valesky (2011–2018), Deputy Independent Democratic Conference Leader for Legislative Operations, founding member
- David Carlucci (2011–2018), Independent Democratic Conference Whip, founding member
- Diane Savino (2011–2018), Independent Democratic Conference Liaison to the Executive Branch, founding member
- Tony Avella (2014–2018), Assistant Conference Leader for Policy and Administration
- Jose Peralta (2017–2018)
- Jesse Hamilton (2017–2018)
- Marisol Alcantara (2017–2018)
- Malcolm Smith (2011–2013)

== See also ==
- Majority Coalition Caucus, a similar power-sharing agreement in the Washington State Senate between 2012 and 2017
- Conservative Democrat
- Democrat in Name Only
