= Zellnor Myrie =

American politician

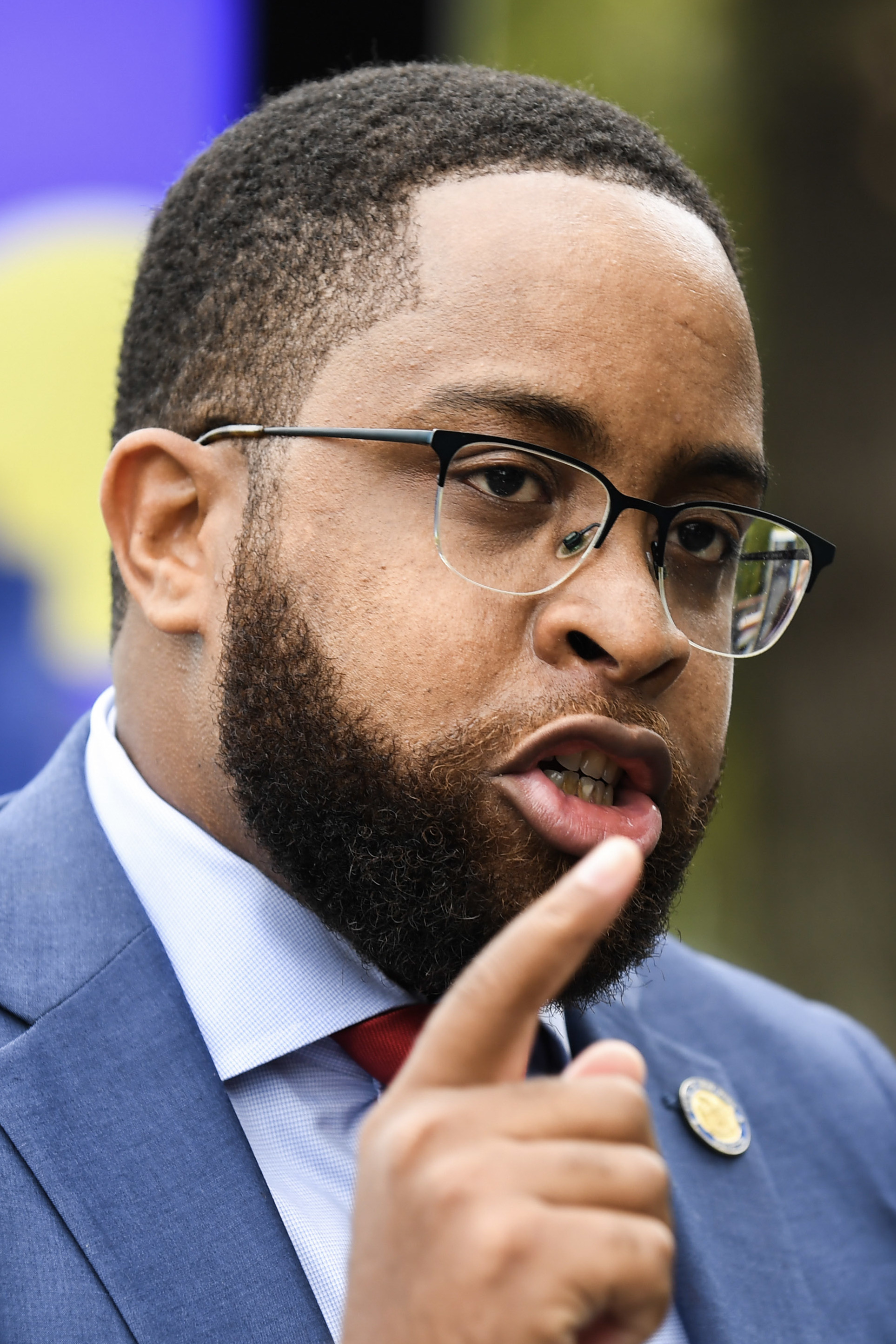
- Myrie in 2020

Member of the New York State Senate from the 20th district
- Incumbent
- Assumed office January 1, 2019
- Preceded by: Jesse Hamilton

Personal details
- Born: November 3, 1986 (age 40) New York City, New York, U.S.
- Party: Democratic
- Spouse: Diana Richardson (m. 2024)
- Education: Fordham University (BA, MA); Cornell University (JD)
- Website: Official website

Zellnor Y. Myrie (born November 3, 1986) is an American politician and attorney. A member of the Democratic Party, he has served in the New York State Senate since 2019, representing the western Brooklyn-based 20th district. He was a candidate for Mayor of New York City in the 2025 election, placing sixth in the first round of the Democratic primary.

== Early life and education ==
Myrie was born in Brooklyn, New York City, to Costa Rican-born immigrant parents and raised in the Prospect Lefferts Gardens neighborhood. He graduated from Brooklyn Technical High School and attended Fordham University, earning his undergraduate and master's degree in urban studies. After graduate school, Myrie earned his Juris Doctor from Cornell Law School where he served as student government president, prison law instructor, and pro bono scholar.

== Career ==
Before law school, Myrie worked for the New York City Council as a legislative director to Fernando Cabrera. After law school, he worked at Davis Polk & Wardwell for just over one year.

=== New York State Senate ===
In the 2018 elections, Myrie ran for New York State Senate in the 20th district. He challenged Jesse Hamilton, a former member of the Independent Democratic Conference, in the Democratic Party primary election. Myrie defeated Hamilton in the September primary, earning 54% of the vote. Hamilton remained on the ballot in the November general election under the Independence and Women's Equality ballot lines, where Myrie defeated him again, earning over 92% of the vote.

Myrie serves as Chair of the Elections Committee in the state senate. Myrie supported the Housing Stability and Tenant Protection Act of 2019. He also sponsored legislation to ban most evictions during New York's COVID-19 state of emergency.

On May 30, 2020, Myrie was pepper-sprayed and handcuffed while taking part in protests following the murder of George Floyd.

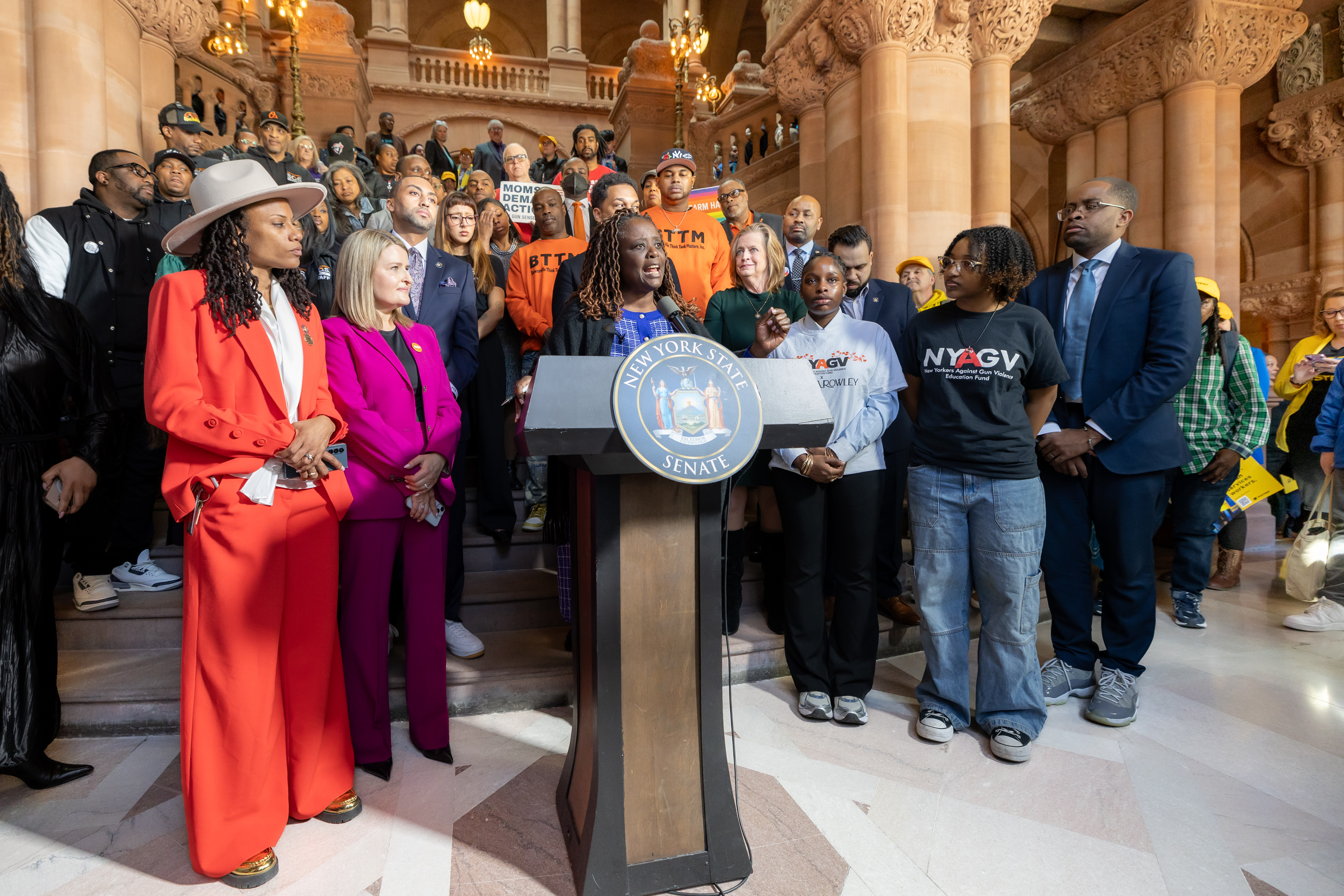
Myrie (right) in Albany

Myrie supports financial institutions having the right to deny lending capital to ammunition and gun industries. Myrie has advocated for requiring food regulators to target corporations that advertise unhealthy foods. In 2021, Myrie was one of two members of the New York State Senate to vote against a bill designating baseball as the official state sport of New York.

In 2021, Myrie authored the Community Violence Intervention Act, which declared gun violence a public health crisis and which provides millions of dollars to local hospital- and community-based violence intervention programs. Myrie also authored a first-in-the-nation law that classifies illegal gun sales as a nuisance, which could open gun manufacturers to liability.

=== 2025 New York City mayoral campaign ===
On May 9, 2024, Myrie announced that he was forming an exploratory committee to prepare for a potential campaign for Mayor of New York City in the 2025 mayoral election. He officially launched his campaign on December 3, 2024. During his campaign, Myrie proposed to increase housing supply in New York City by 700,000 homes by allowing more housing in neighborhoods with stringent zoning rules, in order to alleviate the housing shortage in the city. His candidacy was characterized as supportive of the YIMBY (Yes In My Backyard) movement.

Myrie ran to the right of Democratic Socialist Zohran Mamdani in the Democratic Party primary. He supported Mamdani in the general election.

== Personal life ==
Myrie is married to former politician Diana Richardson. Richardson and Myrie got engaged in San Juan, Puerto Rico in 2022 at the SOMOS Conference. Richardson and Myrie were both pepper-sprayed by the police during a George Floyd racial justice protest in Brooklyn outside Barclays Center in 2020.
