= Marisol Alcantara =

American-Dominican politician

Member of the New York Senate from the 31st district
- In office January 1, 2017 – December 31, 2018
- Preceded by: Adriano Espaillat
- Succeeded by: Robert Jackson

Personal details
- Born: Dominican Republic
- Party: Democratic
- Other political affiliations: Independent Democratic Conference (2017–2018)
- Education: Manhattan College (BA); City University of New York (MA)
- Website: State Senate website

Marisol Alcantara is an American politician in New York City. A member of the Democratic Party, she represented the New York State Senate's 31st District from 2017 to 2018. Alcantara is a former member of the Independent Democratic Conference (IDC), a group of Democratic senators who allied themselves with Senate Republicans.

== Life and career ==
Alcantara was born in the Dominican Republic and emigrated to New York City at the age of twelve. She has resided in Upper Manhattan ever since. She graduated from Manhattan College with a degree in government and politics, as well as the CUNY Murphy Institute of Labor, where she earned her master's degree.

A Coro fellow, Alcantara has spent her career working on pro-immigration initiatives as well as with labor organizations. She has helped organize with SEIU 32BJ, as well as with the New York State Nurses Association. In politics, Alcantara has held the position of a Democratic District Leader and served as the campaign manager for Ydanis Rodriguez in his first campaign for the New York City Council.

== New York State Senate ==
In 2016, state Senator Adriano Espaillat ran for U.S. House of Representatives in the race to replace retiring long-serving Congressman Charlie Rangel of Harlem. Upon winning that election, Espaillat's state Senate seat became open. While Alcantara did not declare her candidacy until after Espaillat won his Congressional primary in June 2016, she entered the race to succeed him when it became clear no other notable Dominican candidate would emerge.

Facing Bloomberg administration alumnus (as Director of State Legislative Affairs) Micah Lasher and former New York City Council member Robert Jackson, Alcantara narrowly won the September 2016 Democratic primary with a plurality of 32.7% of the vote, as Lasher received 31.6% of the vote–294 votes shy of her total, and Jackson received 30.6% of the vote; the race was considered one of the elections to watch in the 2016 state primaries, and emerged as one of the closest that cycle. Alcantara easily won the general election in the heavily Democratic district with over 85% of the vote.

Upon winning her seat, Alcantara announced that she would join the Independent Democratic Conference, a group of state senate Democrats that allied with the senate Republicans, allowing Republicans to control the chamber. This did not come as a surprise, as she owed Independent Democratic Leader Jeffrey D. Klein for his assistance in her primary election campaign. After joining the majority coalition, the freshman Senator was named Chair of the Labor Committee.

According to The New York Times, Alcantara "condemned" a bill by Democrats designed to stop deportations in New York State.

Alcantara proposed a bill that raised the limit for discretionary contracts for minorities and women from $20,000 to $150,000 that passed.

In April 2018, Alcantara and her IDC colleagues rejoined the Senate Democratic Conference. Subsequently, the Republican conference stripped Alcantara of her position as Chair of the Labor Committee.

In the September 2018 Democratic primary election, Alcantara was challenged again by Jackson (who also won the backing of the Working Families Party) as well as by Thomas Leon and Tirso Santiago Pina. This time, Jackson won the four-way primary in a landslide with 56% of the vote to Alcantara's 38%. Alcantara's defeat was attributed to long-simmering anger with the former members of the IDC. As part of New York State's electoral fusion laws allowing candidates to run on multiple ballot lines in one election, Alcantara still appeared in the November 6, 2018, general election as the third-party Independence Party of New York candidate; however, Alcantara conceded to Jackson and pledged to work with him.

== See also ==
- List of New York state senators

Political offices
Preceded by Adriano Espaillat	New York State Senate, 31st District; 2017–2018	Succeeded by Robert Jackson
