= Pants Velour =

American hip hop group

- Origin: New York City, New York, United States
- Genre: Hip hop
- Years active: 2006-present
- Label: Tommy Boy Entertainment
- Members: Niki Darling, vocalist Josh Raff, emcee Eli Northrup, emcee Sam Coe, guitarist Jordan Battiste, keyboardist Max Calkin, bassist Richard Curtis, drummer Cenophia Mitchell, backup vocalist
- Past members: Nellie Thompson; Sarah Charness
- Website: www.pantsvelour.com

Pants Velour is an American hip hop group from New York City, New York. Pants records for Tommy Boy Entertainment.

== Origins ==
In 2006, Eli Northrup, Nellie Thompson, Sam Coe, and Josh Raff formed Pants Velour while undergraduate students at Cornell University. After graduating in 2007, the members reunited in New York City in 2008. Eli Northrup is a rapper in the group and has also been considered a "Hypeman" who pumps up the crowd. Niki Darling is the lead singer of the group.

== Career ==
Pants Velour has played shows alongside Mobb Deep, Dru Hill, Magic!, and members of Black Sheep, A Tribe Called Quest, and Naughty By Nature. Dial 7 Car and Limousine featured Pants Velour in a popular ad campaign. Pants Velour has performed in Europe.

In 2011, Pants Velour made a hip hop video entitled "Charlie Sheen: Always Winning," which became a YouTube sensation. The song was inspired by Sheen’s interview on ABC television. At the time of the video's release, Eli Northrup was a law student at New York University School of Law. Above the Law (blog) ran a blurb on the story, and it became a big story in the legal community. Am Law Daily’s Careerist blog called it “fast and saucy—especially amazing coming from a serious law student.” While in law school, Northrup regularly performed with Pants Velour.

In 2012, Pants Velour represented Manhattan in the Battle of the Boroughs.

In 2013, Pants Velour played at New Music Seminar.

In 2014, Pants Velour signed with Tommy Boy Entertainment. The group played at CMJ 2014 in New York City, New York. The group released a music video for 'All In.' The video was produced by Howard Buksbaum and Danny Ameri of Very Nice Industries. Broadway World called the video cutting edge, a technological wonder and a visual feast. Pants Velour was the opening performance for Dru Hill at B.B. Kings in NYC in October 2014. Pants Velour was a supporting act for Magic! at Webster Hall. 'Taxidermist,' was currently #30 on the zipDJ Urban chart. The group has played at the Highline Ballroom. Pants Velour teamed up with Socialfly to release a music video called #DoTheSelfie.

In 2015, Pants Velour performed at Pianos. The group also performed at the Brooklyn Bowl.

== Musical style ==
USA Today described the group as a “unique brand of hip-hop, R&B, and pop”, and The Washington Post described them as a combination of ”today’s pop-soul and yesterday’s hip-hop.” The group has also been described as a combination of the Beastie Boys and The Black Eyed Peas. They have been characterized as infusing hip-hop, pop, rock and soul together.
