= New York's 20th State Senate district =

District of the New York State Senate

Senator
Zellnor Myrie; D–Prospect Lefferts Gardens
- Registration: 77.9% Democratic; 4.4% Republican; 15.0% No party preference
- Demographics: 18% White; 50% Black; 20% Hispanic; 10% Asian
- Population (2017): 318,142
- Registered voters: 203,529

New York's 20th State Senate district is one of 63 districts in the New York State Senate. It has been represented by Democrat Zellnor Myrie since 2019, following his victory over IDC-aligned incumbent Jesse Hamilton in the 2018 primary election. Among the seat's prior occupants are former Brooklyn borough president Marty Markowitz and former Mayor Eric Adams.

== Geography ==
=== 2020s ===
District 20 largely covers central and western Brooklyn. The district includes most of the neighborhoods of Crown Heights, Prospect Lefferts Gardens and Windsor Terrace, as well as portions of East Flatbush, Kensington, Park Slope, Remsen Village, Prospect Heights, South Slope and Sunset Park.

The district overlaps with New York's 8th, 9th, and 10th congressional districts, the 42nd, 43rd, 44th, 51st, 52nd, 55th, 56th, 57th, and 58th districts of the New York State Assembly, and the 35th, 36th, 39th, 40th and 41st districts of the New York City Council.

=== 2010s ===
District 20 covers two separate areas in central Brooklyn, linked together by a narrow strip of city blocks. The district includes parts of the neighborhoods of Brownsville, Crown Heights, East Flatbush, Gowanus, Park Slope, Prospect Heights, Prospect Lefferts Gardens, South Slope, and Sunset Park.

The district overlaps with New York's 7th, 8th, 9th, and 10th congressional districts, and with the 42nd, 43rd, 44th, 49th, 51st, 52nd, 55th, 56th, 57th, and 58th districts of the New York State Assembly.

== Recent election results ==
=== 2026 ===
2026 New York State Senate election, District 20
Party	Candidate	Votes	%
Democratic	Zellnor Myrie		
Working Families	Zellnor Myrie		
Total	Zellnor Myrie (incumbent)		
Write-in			
Total votes			100.0

=== 2024 ===
2024 New York State Senate election, District 20
Party	Candidate	Votes	%
Democratic	Zellnor Myrie (incumbent)	107,498	99.3
Write-in		714	0.7
Total votes		108,212	100.0
Democratic hold			

=== 2022 ===
2022 New York State Senate election, District 20
Party	Candidate	Votes	%
Democratic	Zellnor Myrie	62,092	
Working Families	Zellnor Myrie	17,944	
Total	Zellnor Myrie (incumbent)	80,036	99.5
Write-in		399	0.5
Total votes		80,435	100.0
Democratic hold			

=== 2020 ===
2020 New York State Senate election, District 20
Party	Candidate	Votes	%
Democratic	Zellnor Myrie	83,080	
Working Families	Zellnor Myrie	16,411	
Total	Zellnor Myrie (incumbent)	99,491	97.3
Libertarian	Tucker Coburn	2,570	2.5
Write-in		171	0.2
Total votes		102,232	100.0
Democratic hold			

=== 2018 ===
2018 New York State Senate election, District 20
Primary election
Party	Candidate	Votes	%
Democratic	Zellnor Myrie	23,784	53.9
Democratic	Jesse Hamilton (incumbent)	20,266	45.9
Write-in		66	0.2
Total votes		44,116	100.0
General election
Democratic	Zellnor Myrie	67,683	
Working Families	Zellnor Myrie	5,491	
Total	Zellnor Myrie	73,174	92.6
Independence	Jesse Hamilton	4,983	
Women's Equality	Jesse Hamilton	745	
Total	Jesse Hamilton (incumbent)	5,728	7.3
Write-in		101	0.1
Total votes		79,003	100.0
Democratic hold			

=== 2016 ===
2016 New York State Senate election, District 20
Party	Candidate	Votes	%
Democratic	Jesse Hamilton	84,081	
Working Families	Jesse Hamilton	5,465	
Independence	Jesse Hamilton	726	
Total	Jesse Hamilton (incumbent)	90,272	95.0
Republican	Menachem Raitport	4,705	
Conservative	Menachem Raitport	1,001	
Total	Menachem Raitport	5,706	5.9
Write-in		112	0.1
Total votes		96,090	100.0
Democratic hold			

=== 2014 ===
2014 New York State Senate election, District 20
Primary election
Party	Candidate	Votes	%
Democratic	Jesse Hamilton	9,799	64.8
Democratic	Rubain Dorancy	4,440	29.3
Democratic	Guillermo Philpotts	816	5.4
Write-in		74	0.5
Total votes		15,129	100.0
General election
Democratic	Jesse Hamilton	32,040	95.5
Conservative	Menachem Raitport	1,445	4.3
Write-in		65	0.2
Total votes		33,550	100.0
Democratic hold			

=== 2012 ===
2012 New York State Senate election, District 20
Party	Candidate	Votes	%
Democratic	Eric Adams	77,335	
Working Families	Eric Adams	3,775	
Total	Eric Adams (incumbent)	81,110	95.7
Republican	Rose Laney	2,683	3.2
Conservative	Brian Kelly	938	1.1
Write-in		38	0.0
Total votes		84,769	100.0
Democratic hold			

=== Federal results in District 20 ===
Year	Office	Results
2020	President	Biden 89.7 – 9.3%
2016	President	Clinton 91.6 – 6.4%
2012	President	Obama 94.2 – 5.0%
2012	Senate	Gillibrand 95.0 – 4.0%
