= Jesse Hamilton =

American politician (born 1964)

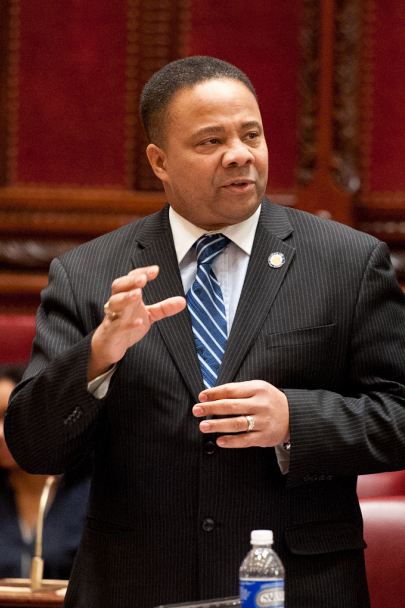

Member of the New York State Senate from the 20th district
- In office January 1, 2015 – December 31, 2018
- Preceded by: Eric Adams
- Succeeded by: Zellnor Myrie

Personal details
- Born: January 31, 1964 (age 62) Brooklyn, New York, U.S.
- Party: Democratic
- Other political affiliations: Independent Democratic Conference (2017–2018)
- Spouse: Lorna Hamilton
- Children: 2
- Education: Ithaca College (BA); Long Island University (MBA); Seton Hall University (JD)

Jesse Hamilton is an American lawyer and politician in New York City. A member of the Democratic Party, he represented the New York State Senate's 20th District, including parts of the Brooklyn neighborhoods of Crown Heights, Brownsville and East Flatbush from 2015 to 2018. Hamilton is a former member of the Independent Democratic Conference (IDC), a group of Democratic senators who allied themselves with Senate Republicans. Hamilton is the Secretary of the Brooklyn Democratic Party, the official organization of the Democratic Party for Brooklyn. He was defeated in the September 2018 Democratic primary election by lawyer Zellnor Myrie.

== Early life ==
Hamilton was born and raised in the South Bronx. He later moved to Crown Heights, and served on the school board, as president of his block association and as president of the Rosa Parks Democratic Club. He was the Democratic District Leader in the 43rd Assembly District for nearly a decade. He also served as counsel for then-Senator Eric Adams of District 20.

== Career ==
=== New York State Senate ===
In November 2013, Adams was elected to the office of Brooklyn Borough president, leaving District 20's State Senate seat vacant. On September 9, 2014, Hamilton won the Democratic Party primary election to represent District 20. There was no Republican Party opponent, Hamilton won the November 2014 general election without opposition.

On Monday, November 7, 2016, Hamilton announced that he would join the Independent Democratic Conference, a group of Democratic senators who caucused with the Senate Republican Conference, allowing the Republicans to control the chamber. In January 2017, after joining the IDC, Hamilton was named Chair of the Senate Standing Committee on Banking - which The New York Times notes earned him a $5,500 raise.

In 2017, Hamilton played a key role in passage of legislation to raise the age of juvenile jurisdiction for 16- and 17-year-olds, ensuring that they will not be treated as adults under the criminal justice system for misdemeanors and many felonies. The legislation also removes 16- and 17-year-olds from Rikers Island by April 1, 2018, to the extent practicable, and by no later than October 1, 2018. The IDC-backed legislation was criticized as a "watered down" version of legislation proposed by Democrats, and because "it still pushes the majority of juveniles through the criminal justice system. "As of 2017, there were 150 minors in Rikers Island.

Hamilton has advocated for an end to broken windows policing and has proposed legislation to decriminalize fare evasion on subways, buses and railroads, which would make fare evasion a civil penalty instead of a criminal penalty.

In 2017, Hamilton and Assemblyman Felix Ortiz passed legislation named "Briana's Law", after 11-year-old Briana Ojeda, that requires New York City police officers and state troopers to be retrained in CPR every two years. The legislation was introduced after the death of Briana Ojeda when she suffered a severe asthma attack. A police officer stopped her mother driving the wrong way on a one-way street but the police officer did not know how to perform CPR to save Briana's life.

In 2018, Hamilton introduced a bill to make it illegal for somebody to call 911 in an attempt to get somebody arrested solely on racial bias when a crime is not committed. This legislation was initiated after a woman called 911 on Hamilton while he was campaigning to be elected to the New York State Senate. Another incident occurred in Central Park in 2020 when a white woman named Amy Cooper called 911 when an African-American black man asked her to put a leash on her hyperactive dog while encountering each other by chance in Central Park. The man is an activist named Christian Cooper. The incident went viral after it was videotaped via mobile phone. The legislation is called the Amy Cooper Anti-Discrimination 911 calling bill. The legislation is grouped together with the police reform package legislation signed into law by Governor Andrew Cuomo in 2020. In an interview, Hamilton said he himself was not impressed by the new state law named after Amy Cooper because the racist white woman did not get arrested for trying to get the innocent black man arrested via calling 911.

Hamilton and his IDC colleagues rejoined the Senate Democratic Conference in April 2018. Subsequently, the Republican conference stripped Hamilton of his position as Chair of the Banks Committee.

In the September 13, 2018 Democratic primary, Hamilton was defeated by lawyer Zellnor Myrie. Hamilton's loss was attributed to long-simmering anger with the former members of the IDC. Due to New York State's electoral fusion laws allowing candidates to run on multiple ballot lines in an election, Hamilton still appeared in the November 6, 2018, general election as the third-party candidate for the Independence Party of New York and the Women's Equality Party. Myrie won the general election.

=== 2020 Assembly primary run ===
In the 2020 elections, Hamilton ran against incumbent Diana Richardson in the Democratic primary for the New York Assembly's 43rd district. Hamilton lost to Richardson in a landslide.

=== Adams administration appointment and arrest ===
In August 2022, Mayor Eric Adams hired Hamilton as a legal counsel at the New York City Department of Citywide Administrative Services or DCAS. He went on to become the is the mayor's Deputy Commissioner for Real Estate Services.

On October 11, 2024, Manhattan District Attorney Alvin Bragg's agents seized Jesse Hamilton's mobile phone as he was exiting Kennedy Airport after returning from a trip to Japan. He was with Eric Adam's chief advisor Ingrid Lewis-Martin at the time, who also had her phone seized from her possession. Adam Clayton Powell IV and Cushman and Wakefield Vice-chair Diana Boutross was also on the trip. The week prior, Mayor Adams was indicted on bribery and other federal charges relating to obtaining campaign donations from Turkish nationals illegally.

In November 2024, it was reported that the Department of Investigation looked into Hamilton's dealings regarding the acquisition of 14 Wall Street in Manhattan, which is owned by a wealthy donor who donated to Mayor Adams' election campaign.

In January 2025 the firm JRT Realty filed a lawsuit claiming that Boutross used her new position with the Adams Administration to ruin the image of JRT by blocking its account with DCAS; JRT is a business rival of Cushman and Wakefield. Both companies have contracts with the City of New York's DCAS. Hamilton strongly pushed for hiring Boutross to her new position by telling Cushman and Wakefield that it would lose its commission deals with the City of New York.

On August 21, 2025, a grand jury convened by Manhattan District Attorney Alvin Bragg indicted Hamilton in connection with wide-ranging bribery and corruption allegations against himself and several other top aides to Mayor Adams. Shortly after his indictment, he resigned from his position as DCAS' Deputy Commissioner for Real Estate Services.

Political offices
Preceded by Eric Adams	New York State Senate, 20th District; 2015–2018	Succeeded by Zellnor Myrie
