= 2016 New York state elections =

- November 8, 2016

Elections were held in the State of New York on November 8, 2016. Presidential primary elections occurred on April 19, 2016, congressional primary elections occurred on June 28, 2016, and state and local primary elections occurred on September 13, 2016. One U.S. Senate seat and all 27 seats in the U.S. House of Representatives were up for election, as were all 63 seats in the New York State Senate and all 150 seats in the New York State Assembly. The 2016 United States presidential election occurred on the same date as the general election.

== President of the United States ==
On Election Day, while Republican presidential nominee Donald Trump won the White House, Democratic presidential nominee Hillary Clinton defeated Trump by a wide margin in New York.

== U.S. Senate ==
Incumbent Democratic U.S. Senator Chuck Schumer won re-election to a fourth term in office.

== House of Representatives ==
In the elections to the U.S. House of Representatives, 18 Democrats and nine Republicans prevailed. No incumbents were defeated.

== State Legislature ==
In the New York State Senate elections, Democrats won 32 seats and Republicans won 31; however, one Democrat opted to caucus with the Republicans and another 7 worked with the Republicans through the Independent Democratic Conference, allowing Republicans to continue to hold a State Senate majority. Democrats retained a large majority in the New York State Assembly.

== See also ==
- 2016 United States Senate election in New York
- 2016 United States House of Representatives elections in New York
- 2016 New York State Senate election
- 2016 New York State Assembly election
