= New York's 31st State Senate district =

American legislative district

Senator
Robert Jackson; D–Fort George
- Registration: 76.4% Democratic; 5.6% Republican; 15.3% No party preference
- Demographics: 30% White; 8% Black; 55% Hispanic; 5% Asian
- Population (2017): 339,071
- Registered voters: 231,899

New York's 31st State Senate district is one of 63 districts in the New York State Senate. It has been represented by Democrat Robert Jackson since 2019. Jackson defeated IDC-aligned incumbent Marisol Alcántara in the 2018 primary election, following primary losses for the same seat in 2014 and 2016.

== Geography ==
District 31 is based in the northern Manhattan neighborhoods of Washington Heights, Inwood, and Marble Hill, also stretching south along the Hudson River to include parts of Hamilton Heights, Harlem, Morningside Heights, the Upper West Side, Hell's Kitchen, and Chelsea.

The district overlaps with New York's 10th, 12th, and 13th congressional districts, and with the 67th, 69th, 70th, 71st, 72nd, and 75th districts of the New York State Assembly.

== Recent election results ==
=== 2026 ===
2026 New York State Senate election, District 31
Primary election
Party	Candidate	Votes	%
Democratic	Robert Jackson (incumbent)	18,882	71.9
Democratic	Nayma Silver-Matos	7,280	27.7
Write-in		108	0.4
Total votes		26,270	100.0
General election
Democratic	Robert Jackson		
Working Families	Robert Jackson		
Total	Robert Jackson (incumbent)		
Write-in			
Total votes			100.0

=== 2024 ===
2024 New York State Senate election, District 31
Party	Candidate	Votes	%
Democratic	Robert Jackson	61,088	
Working Families	Robert Jackson	9,206	
Total	Robert Jackson (incumbent)	70,294	99.3
Write-in		470	0.7
Total votes		70,764	100.0
Democratic hold			

=== 2022 ===
2022 New York State Senate election, District 31
Primary election
Party	Candidate	Votes	%
Democratic	Robert Jackson (incumbent)	10,478	57.9
Democratic	Angel Vasquez	5,900	32.7
Democratic	Francesca Castellanos	896	5.0
Democratic	Ruben Vargas	733	4.1
Write-in		61	0.3
Total votes		18,068	100.0
General election
Democratic	Robert Jackson	36,927	
Working Families	Robert Jackson	5,183	
Total	Robert Jackson (incumbent)	42,110	85.1
Republican	Donald Skinner	7,277	14.7
Write-in		81	0.2
Total votes		49,468	100.0
Democratic hold			

=== 2020 ===
2020 New York State Senate election, District 31
Primary election
Party	Candidate	Votes	%
Democratic	Robert Jackson (incumbent)	30,443	84.0
Democratic	Tirso Santiago Pina	5,653	15.6
Write-in		124	0.4
Total votes		36,224	100.0
General election
Democratic	Robert Jackson	90,090	
Working Families	Robert Jackson	16,982	
Total	Robert Jackson (incumbent)	107,072	88.4
Republican	Melinda Crump	13,961	11.5
Write-in		123	0.1
Total votes		121,156	100.0
Democratic hold			

=== 2018 ===
2018 New York State Senate election, District 31
Primary election
Party	Candidate	Votes	%
Democratic	Robert Jackson	29,140	56.1
Democratic	Marisol Alcántara (incumbent)	19,885	38.3
Democratic	Tirso Santiago Pina	2,076	4.0
Democratic	Thomas Leon	778	1.5
Write-in		84	0.1
Total votes		51,963	100.0
General election
Democratic	Robert Jackson	81,821	
Working Families	Robert Jackson	5,145	
Total	Robert Jackson	86,966	88.7
Republican	Melinda Crump	6,067	
Reform	Melinda Crump	168	
Total	Melinda Crump	6,235	6.4
Independence	Marisol Alcántara (incumbent)	4,660	4.8
Write-in		74	0.1
Total votes		97,935	100.0
Democratic hold			

=== 2016 ===
2016 New York State Senate election, District 31
Primary election
Party	Candidate	Votes	%
Democratic	Marisol Alcántara	8,469	32.7
Democratic	Micah Lasher	8,175	31.5
Democratic	Robert Jackson	7,936	30.6
Democratic	Luis Tejada	1,316	5.1
Write-in		26	0.1
Total votes		25,922	100.0
General election
Democratic	Marisol Alcántara	97,964	85.3
Republican	Melinda Crump	8,719	7.6
Green	Julia Willebrand	6,400	5.6
Conservative	John Toro	1,368	1.2
Write-in		331	0.3
Total votes		114,782	100.0
Democratic hold			

=== 2014 ===
2014 New York State Senate election, District 31
Primary election
Party	Candidate	Votes	%
Democratic	Adriano Espaillat (incumbent)	10,439	49.8
Democratic	Robert Jackson	9,019	43.0
Democratic	Luis Tejada	1,466	7.0
Write-in		38	0.2
Total votes		20,962	100.0
General election
Democratic	Adriano Espaillat (incumbent)	37,089	98.7
Write-in		502	1.3
Total votes		37,591	100.0
Democratic hold			

=== 2012 ===
2012 New York State Senate election, District 31
Primary election
Party	Candidate	Votes	%
Democratic	Adriano Espaillat (incumbent)	11,138	61.3
Democratic	Guillermo Linares	6,927	38.1
Write-in		107	0.6
Total votes		18,172	100.0
General election
Democratic	Adriano Espaillat (incumbent)	85,163	91.1
Republican	Martin Chicon	8,190	8.8
Write-in		112	0.1
Total votes		93,465	100.0
Democratic hold			

=== Federal results in District 31 ===
Year	Office	Results
2020	President	Biden 86.4 – 12.3%
2016	President	Clinton 90.5 – 7.0%
2012	President	Obama 90.2 – 8.6%
2012	Senate	Gillibrand 91.8 – 6.9%
