= Micah Lasher =

American politician (born 1981)

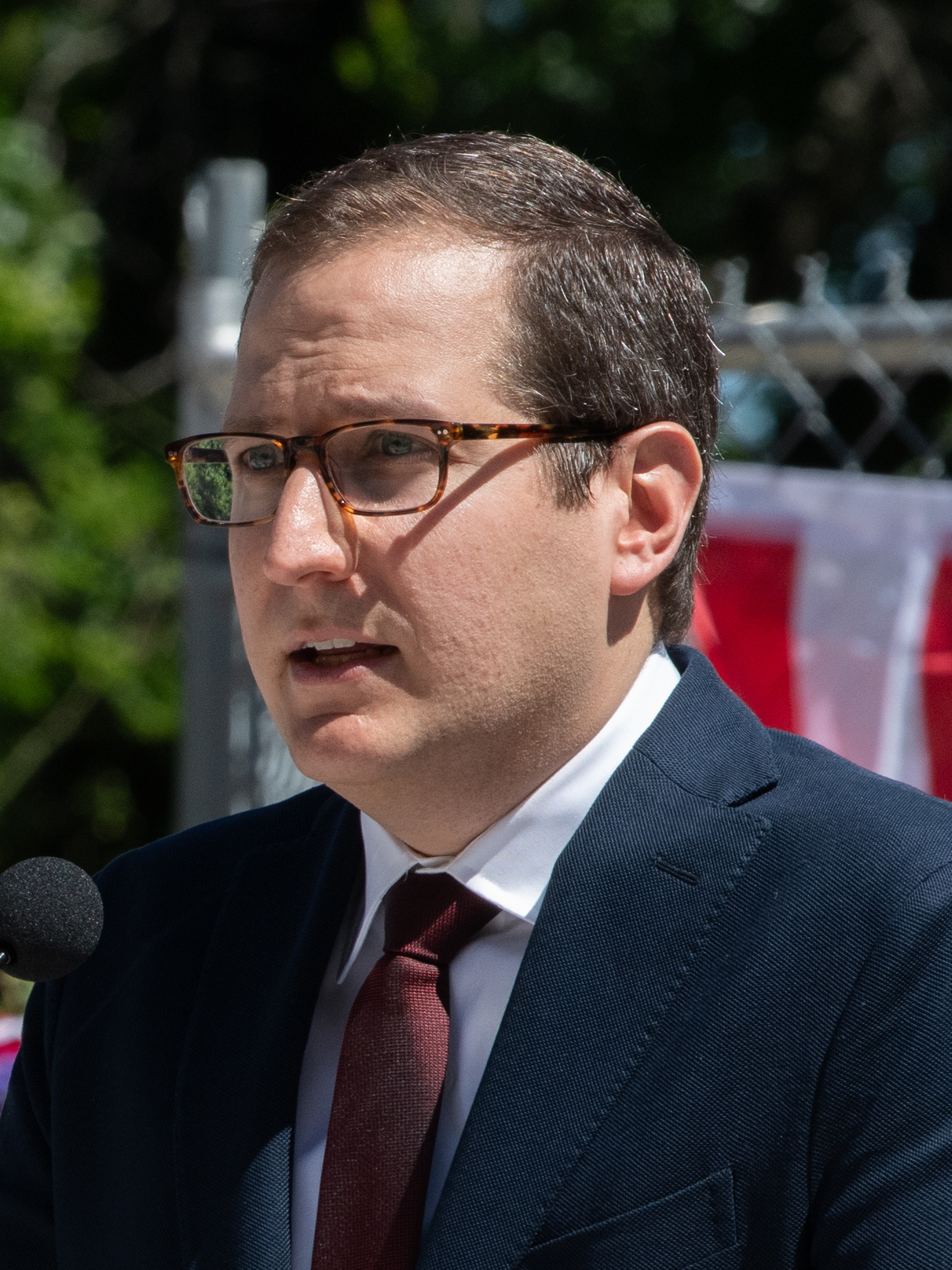
- Lasher in 2025

Member-elect of the U.S. House of Representatives from New York's 12th district
- Assuming office January 3, 2027
- Succeeding: Jerry Nadler

Member of the New York State Assembly from the 69th district
- Incumbent
- Assumed office January 1, 2025
- Preceded by: Daniel J. O'Donnell

Personal details
- Born: Micah Charles Lasher; December 18, 1981 (age 44) New York City, New York, U.S.
- Party: Democratic
- Spouse: Elizabeth Mann (m. 2009)
- Children: 3
- Education: New York University (BA)
- Website: Campaign website

Micah Charles Lasher (born December 18, 1981) is an American politician who is the U.S. representative-elect for New York's 12th congressional district.

Lasher has served as a member of the New York State Assembly for District 69 in Manhattan in New York City since 2025, a position he will maintain until his term ends on January 1, 2027. He will be sworn into Congress when the new session begins on January 3, 2027.

He was previously the Director of State Legislative Affairs under New York City Mayor Michael Bloomberg, the Chief of Staff of NY State Attorney General Eric Schneiderman, and the Director of Policy for New York Governor Kathy Hochul.

== Early life and education ==
He was born in Manhattan to Stephanie Lasher and Albert C. Lasher. Lasher grew up on the Upper West Side of Manhattan.

Lasher performed magic tricks on national television by the age of 13, appearing on the Late Show with David Letterman and on NBC's Today show. While a 14-year-old in high school, he authored the 224-page book The Magic Of Micah Lasher: More Than Fifty Tricks That Will Amaze & Delight Everyone Including You (1996).

In 1998 as a 16-year-old student at Stuyvesant High School, he became an editor-in-chief of the school's student newspaper, The Stuyvesant Spectator. In 1999, after the school's assistant principal pleaded guilty to sexually abusing a 15-year-old female student, Lasher condemned the fact that the assistant principal was only sentenced to three years' probation and was receiving a full pension. Lasher graduated from Stuyvesant High School in 1999.

He graduated from New York University in 2003 with a degree in sociology. While at NYU, Lasher spent a semester in London, where he was roommates with Aziz Ansari. Before he graduated from college, he was a founding partner of the national political consulting firm SKDKnickerbocker (now called SKDK), advising elected government officials, labor unions, and nonprofits. The New York Times reported that he "has been called a political whiz kid ever since he helped to found an influential political consulting firm while still in college."

== Political career ==
=== Early years ===
Lasher's first job, when he was 16 years old and a junior in high school, was as deputy campaign manager for Eric Schneiderman's winning campaign for the New York State Senate in 1998. When he was 17 years old, he was an informal adviser to New York State Assemblyman Scott Stringer. In 2001, when Lasher was 19, he managed Brad Hoylman-Sigal's campaign for New York City Council out of his dorm room. From 2007 to 2009, he worked as a special assistant and chief aide to Jerrold Nadler.

In 2009, he was the Executive Director of Public Affairs and a lobbyist for the New York City Department of Education, as well as a trustee of the Community Service Society of New York, an antipoverty organization.

=== NYC Director of State Legislative Affairs ===
From 2010 to 2012, Lasher was Director of State Legislative Affairs, the city's chief lobbyist, for New York City Mayor Michael Bloomberg. During his time in that role, he criticized proposed state budget cuts to the city’s senior centers, which he called "an unusually painful and disproportionate cut to a very vulnerable population," supported a new law under which hundreds of former New York City factory buildings and warehouses were able to become legal residential lofts, and took part in negotiating an agreement creating a new teacher evaluation system.

=== Executive Director of StudentsFirstNY ===
In 2012, he became the Executive Director of StudentsFirstNY, the New York branch of a national education reform advocacy organization founded to promote the expansion of charter schools and the firing of ineffective teachers, and to oppose tenure. In response to criticism from liberal advocacy groups and labor unions, Lasher said that his group was "a union for students, fighting for a quality teacher for every child," and that the interests of the teachers' union were not always aligned with the interests of schoolchildren.

=== Chief of Staff of NY State Attorney General ===
In 2013, New York State Attorney General Eric Schneiderman hired Lasher as Chief of Staff, a position in which he managed 1,800 people. In that role, he he helped coordinate a lawsuit against Donald Trump and Trump University. Lasher also served as an aide and community liaison for Congressman Jerrold Nadler.

=== New York Senate campaign ===
In 2016, Lasher ran for the New York Senate in the 31st district, in the northern and western edge of Manhattan, after Adriano Espaillat left the position to successfully run for the U.S. House of Representatives. He was endorsed by The New York Times. Lasher lost to Marisol Alcantara in the Democratic primary election, as she received a plurality of 32.7% of the vote, and Lasher received 31.6% of the vote–294 votes shy of her total. She went on to join the Independent Democratic Conference, a caucus of Democrats who formed a power-sharing arrangement with the Senate Republican Conference.

=== Sidewalk Labs ===
From 2017 to 2020, Lasher worked as Head of Policy and Communications at Sidewalk Labs, an Alphabet Google company the goal of which was to innovate technology and urban design to improve cities. Sidewalk's primary proposed project, Sidewalk Toronto, was intended to be an innovative reinvention of Toronto's neglected eastern downtown waterfront, and Sidewalks Labs said it did not intend to own the data it gathered in public spaces and instead would relinquish control of the data to an independent organization to be established and named the Civic Data Trust. The proposed project generated controversy in Toronto over data privacy and surveillance and was eventually cancelled by Alphabet which cited economic concerns caused by the uncertainty of the economy experiencing the COVID-19 pandemic .

=== Director of Policy of New York State ===
In November 2021, New York State Governor Kathy Hochul appointed Lasher as Director of Policy. During his tenure, Lasher participated in shaping and implementing state policy following Hochul’s ascension to the governorship after Andrew Cuomo's resignation. In his role, Lasher helped write a set of gun laws directly after the 2022 Buffalo shooting. He resigned from this role in early 2024 to pursue a campaign for the New York State Assembly.

As of 2024, Lasher had served as the chair of the Riverside Park Conservancy, a non-profit organization supporting the maintenance and improvement of Riverside Park.

=== New York State Assembly ===
During the 2024 New York State Assembly election, Lasher ran for the 69th district, comprising Manhattan Valley, Morningside Heights, and portions of the Upper West Side and West Harlem. He ran in a crowded five-candidate Democratic primary, securing victory with 53% of the vote, 19 per cent ahead of his closest competitor.

Lasher's campaign focused on addressing housing affordability, advocating for comprehensive public education reforms, and fostering economic equality. He also proposed solutions for addressing zoning and vacant storefront issues in his district. Lasher received endorsements from local elected officials and organizations, including U.S. representatives Jerrold Nadler and Adriano Espaillat, and Manhattan Borough president Mark Levine. He ran unopposed in the November general election.

In April 2025, Lasher co-sponsored a bill requiring an audit of a state subsidy agreement with Elon Musk's Tesla in order to "identify waste, fraud and abuse committed by private parties to the contract." It would assess whether Tesla is meeting job creation targets, making promised investments, paying sufficient rent, and meeting job training commitments. If Tesla were not in compliance, the state could claw back state benefits,assess penalties, and end contracts. Lasher said: "It is the height of hypocrisy that Elon Musk, the man who is dismantling federal agencies and doing enormous damage on the basis of wildly unsubstantiated claims of waste, fraud and abuse, is the beneficiary of one of the biggest, shadiest subsidy deals of all time,"

Also in April 2025, he worked to rescue the Metro Theater, a landmark 1933 Art Deco movie theater on Broadway near West 99th Street on the Upper West Side. The movie theater received discretionary grants from New York Governor Kathy Hochul, whom he had lobbied, as well as from the New York State Senate.

In June 2025, amid concern President Trump might seek to strip federal laws governing housing discrimination, a New York State bill that he co-sponsored was adopted by New York State lawmakers. The intent of the bill was to pre-empt any such potential rollback by allowing prosecutors to bring housing discrimination cases based on conditions in residences, rather than them being required to prove intent to discriminate. Lasher said: "It would mean that the state law is no longer weaker than the federal law, and clarify any question now or in the future about whether claims brought under state law must meet some higher burden."

In November 2025, in the wake of a rowdy and chaotic protest at the entryway of Park East Synagogue, which included chants of "Death to the IDF" and "Globalize the intifada," and an exhortation that "We need to make them scared!," Lasher said: "If you are standing outside a synagogue calling for 'intifada revolution,' you are not peacefully protesting. You are trying to intimidate and create fear among Jews, and that is never acceptable."

In December 2025, in the wake of President Trump's "mass deportations", Lasher cosponsored legislation to designate schools, houses of worship, and nonprofit offices as off-limits to federal agents trying to make administrative arrests or arrests without a judicial arrest warrant. That way, he said, "our neighbors can function freely in our communities and deal with the basic needs of life, and do so not in the shadows."

=== U.S. House of Representatives race ===
Results by precinct Lasher: 30–40%; 40–50%; 50–60%; 60–70%; 100%; Bores: 20–30%; 30–40%; 40–50%; 50–60%; Schlossberg: 30–40%; 50–60%; Schwalbe: 100%; Tie: 30–40%

In September 2025, U.S. Representative Jerry Nadler announced that he would retire from his congressional seat when his then-current term ended; it was reported that Nadler planned on supporting Lasher in a prospective primary. On September 15, Lasher decided to run for Nadler's seat. The New York Times wrote of the district, New York's 12th congressional district: "Stretching from Union Square through Central Park, the district is home to more Fortune 500 companies, millionaires, and cultural landmarks than perhaps anywhere in the country," is "one of the oldest, best-educated and wealthiest districts in the United States," and that it is "one of the most Democratic congressional districts in the United States."

Lasher said that his number one priority would be to fight what he has called the Trump administration's assault on the Constitution of the United States, democratic norms, and vital public programs. His policy proposals also include raising the federal minimum wage, passing Medicare for All, and abolishing ICE, which he said had become "the embodiment of a thugocracy" and a "completely unchecked, almost militia-like, organization." He believes that Democrats in Congress should be willing to shut down the government instead of funding what he calls the Trump administration's "fascist policies." He has also proposed redrawing New York's congressional district maps in response to redistricting efforts in Republican-led states, and has proposed legislation in that regard. He opposes legislation that would prohibit weapons sales to Israel. After Zohran Mamdani became the nominee of the Democratic Party in his campaign to become mayor of New York City, Lasher supported him, while at the same time writing that he hoped that Mamdani "can come to better appreciate the deeply personal and historical importance that the survival of Israel as a Jewish state holds for Jewish New Yorkers. I hope that he is able to see antisemitism when it takes the form of a double-standard being applied to Israel precisely because it is a Jewish state."

Lasher was endorsed by former New York City mayor Michael Bloomberg, U.S. representatives Jerry Nadler and Nydia Velázquez, Governor of New York Kathy Hochul, former Governor of New York David Paterson, and former Attorney General of New York Eric Schneiderman.

Lasher won the Democratic primary on June 23, 2026, defeating Alex Bores, George Conway, and Jack Schlossberg.

Lasher won New York's 12th Congressional District seat in the general election on November 3, 2026. He defeated Republican nominee Caroline Shinkle by a margin of at least 143,402 votes, with about 77 percent of the vote to Shinkle’s 20 percent. Lasher will take his seat in Congress when the new session begins on January 3, 2027.

== Personal life ==
Lasher lives on the Upper West Side of Manhattan with his family. His wife, whom he married in 2009, is named Elizabeth, and they have three children. He is Jewish, and his family is a member of Congregation Rodeph Sholom.

== Writings ==
- Micah C. Lasher, "Opinion: What's Fairer Than a Test?", The New York Times, May 10, 1997.
- Lasher, Micah (August 18, 2024). "New York needs an Olympic goal: Paris shows how a city can improve its permanent infrastructure". The New York Daily News.
- Lasher, Micah (June 9, 2026). "Micah Lasher: Why I'm running for Congress this year". The New York Daily News.

== Electoral history ==
=== 2016 ===
2016 New York State Senate election, District 31
Primary election
Party	Candidate	Votes	%
Democratic	Marisol Alcántara	8,469	32.7
Democratic	Micah Lasher	8,175	31.5
Democratic	Robert Jackson	7,936	30.6
Democratic	Luis Tejada	1,316	5.1
Write-in		26	0.1
Total votes		25,922	100.0

=== 2024 ===
2024 New York State Assembly election, District 69
Primary election
Party	Candidate	Votes	%
Democratic	Micah Lasher	7,410	52.6
Democratic	Eli Northrup	4,839	34.4
Democratic	Carmen Quinones	832	5.9
Democratic	Melissa Rosenberg	671	4.8
Democratic	Jack Kellner	293	2.1
Write-in		36	0.2
Total votes		14,081	100.0
General election
Democratic	Micah Lasher	48,223	99.1
Write-in		434	0.9
Total votes		48,657	100.0
Democratic hold			

U.S. House of Representatives
Preceded by Jerry Nadler	Member of the U.S. House of Representatives from New York's 12th congressional district Taking office 2027	Elect
