= Marie M. Runyon =

American politician (1915–2018)

Member of the New York State Assembly from the 70th district
- In office 1975–1976
- Preceded by: Jesse Gray
- Succeeded by: Edward C. Sullivan

Marie M. Runyon (March 20, 1915 – October 7, 2018) was an American activist and former New York State Legislator from New York.

== Early life ==
Marie Runyon (born Marie Morgan) was born on March 20, 1915, in Brevard, North Carolina to a pharmacist father and college educated mother. Runyon’s older sister Louise attended Berea College where Marie soon followed. While attending Kentucky’s Berea College, Marie studied Psychology, served as Vice class president, played Varsity basketball, and sang in the school choir. After graduating in 1937 Runyon worked jobs in Kentucky, Minnesota, Connecticut, and Michigan. She moved to New York City in 1947. Runyon began to work as a copy reader for the New York Post in 1947, and soon after married her boss, Dick Runyon. Together they had one daughter, Louise, and Marie quit her job to be a full-time mother. 3 years later the pair divorced and Marie found herself homeless and a single mother. She and her daughter lived with various friends and relatives until she landed a job at the American Civil Liberties Union (ACLU) as a membership recruiter and an apartment at 130 Morningside Drive in West Harlem.

== Community Organizing and Activism ==
=== Morningside Drive ===
130 Morningside Drive was owned by Columbia University and at the epicenter of the city and university’s redevelopment plans for Harlem. The university decided Runyon’s block was the perfect new location for their School of Pharmacy and handed out eviction notices to residents overnight. Runyon became an instant community activist and joined other neighborhood leaders such as Reverend Eugene Callender in the distribution of a letter that enlightened Harlemites to the dangers of city redevelopment and how Columbia’s plans will affect them. Runyon formed a tenants group for the six at-risk buildings on Morningside Drive known as "The Morningside Six". The group made demands with their university landlord but after being ignored the group began a sequence of rent strikes and protest demonstrations. Protests ranged from funeral processions for their homes down Morningside Drive to Runyon writing "We Shall Not Be Moved!" on the sidewalk with her own blood. Runyon was arrested for these and many more protests over 40 times. The activists of Morningside Drive organized a 10 week seminar that was led by city planner and activist Walter Thabit to educate attendees on recent redevelopment projects. After a 40 year fight, resident’s won their fight against Columbia University; tenants' demands were met and renovations began to 130 Morningside Drive in 2000. William Scott, then Vice President of Columbia University’s Institutional Real Estate, had played a large role in the university’s truce with residents and proposed 130 Morningside Drive be renamed "Marie Runyon Court." In 2002, the building officially became Marie Runyon Court.

=== Political career ===
In 1974 Runyon was approached by the African-American Collective of Harlem to run for office in the NY State Assembly. She was hesitant, being very anti-establishment but she ran and she defeated the incumbent Assemblyman Jesse Gray in the Democratic primary of the 70th Assembly District by fewer than 200 votes and, in November, was elected to the Assembly. She was a member of the New York State Assembly in 1975 and 1976. During her time in office she served on housing, social services, labor, and cities committees;making her focus on criminal justice reform. She used her right as an assembly-woman to visit Attica prison at midnight to make sure inmates were not being abused by guards. In 1976 she ran for re-nomination, but was challenged by six contenders in the Democratic primary, and was defeated by Edward C. Sullivan.

=== Harlem Restoration Project ===
Afterwards Runyon remained active in tenants' affairs, and was Executive Director of the Harlem Restoration Project Inc. Marie remained the head of the Harlem Restoration Project into the 1990s but she fought constantly with the members of the board who found her management style to be out of date and too authoritarian. Unable to keep up with building opportunities due to fiscal disorganization, the board ousted Runyon. She then took them to court and took back the organization - this went back and forth a few times- until she finally resigned late in her 80s.

== Late life ==
She was active in the Granny Peace Brigade. Runyon played cameo roles in the 2004 movie The Manchurian Candidate as the mother of Robert Arthur, and as a wedding guest in the 2008 movie Rachel Getting Married. On March 20, 2015, she celebrated her 100th birthday. In 2017, Runyon reported to the New York Post that at 102 she believes her meaningful work has kept her alive for so long and that she continues to enjoy a gin and tonic before bed every night. Marie Runyon dedicated much of her life to the fight for Morningside Drive, getting arrested over 40 times. In 2001, the F.B.I. had a 671 page file on Marie. Runyon’s home even reflected a lifetime of activism, her apartment’s entry way was filled with buttons and pins promoting the various movements and causes she supported. She died on October 7, 2018, at the age of 103 at her Manhattan apartment.

New York State Assembly
Preceded by Jesse Gray	New York State Assembly; 70th District; 1975–1976	Succeeded by Edward C. Sullivan
