= Daniel J. O'Donnell =

American politician (born 1960)

Daniel O'Donnell
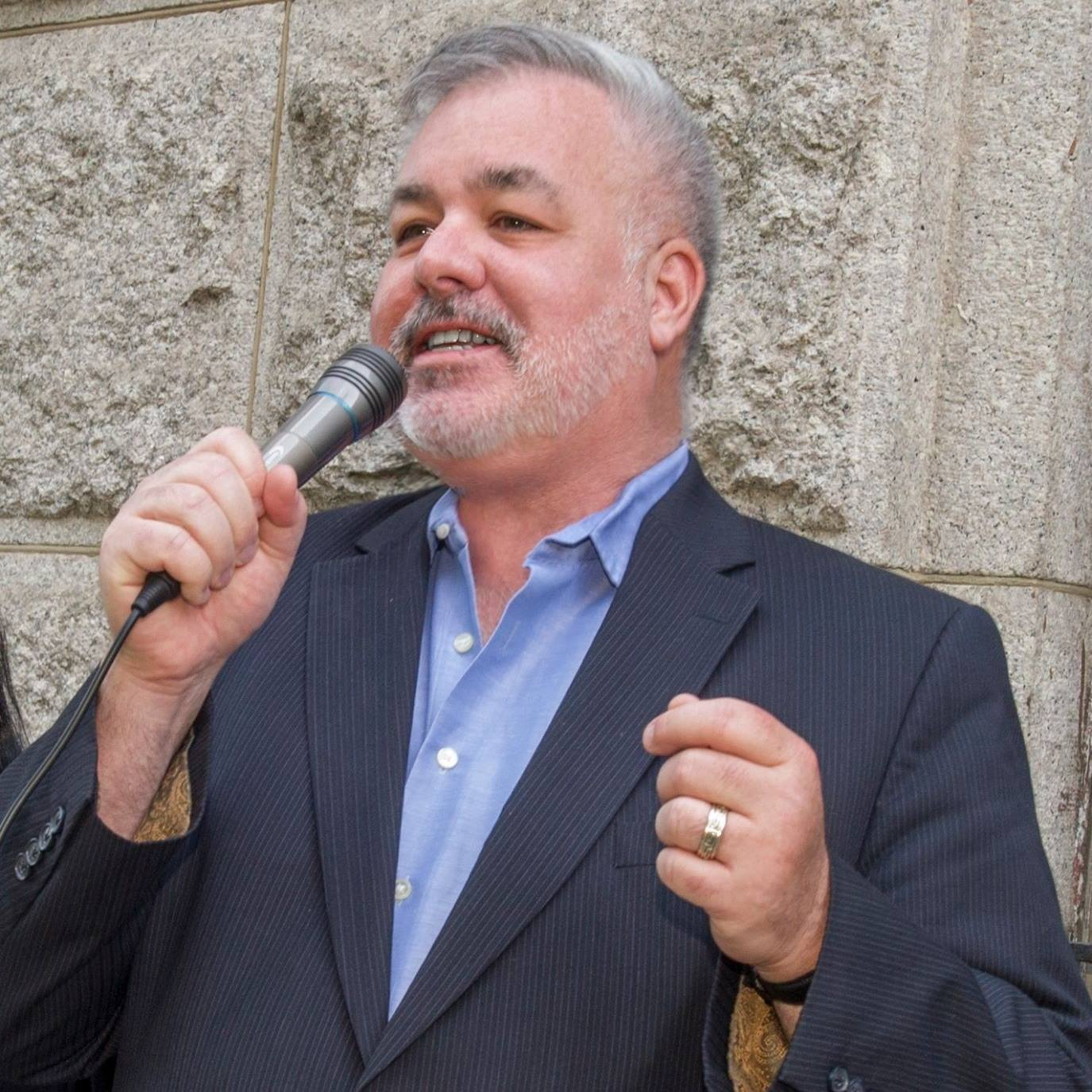
- O'Donnell in 2017

Member of the New York State Assembly from the 69th district
- In office January 3, 2003 – December 31, 2024
- Preceded by: Edward C. Sullivan
- Succeeded by: Micah Lasher

Personal details
- Born: November 17, 1960 (age 65) Queens, New York, U.S.
- Party: Democratic
- Spouse: John Banta (m. 2012)
- Relatives: Rosie O'Donnell (sister)
- Education: George Washington University (BA); City University of New York, Queens (JD)
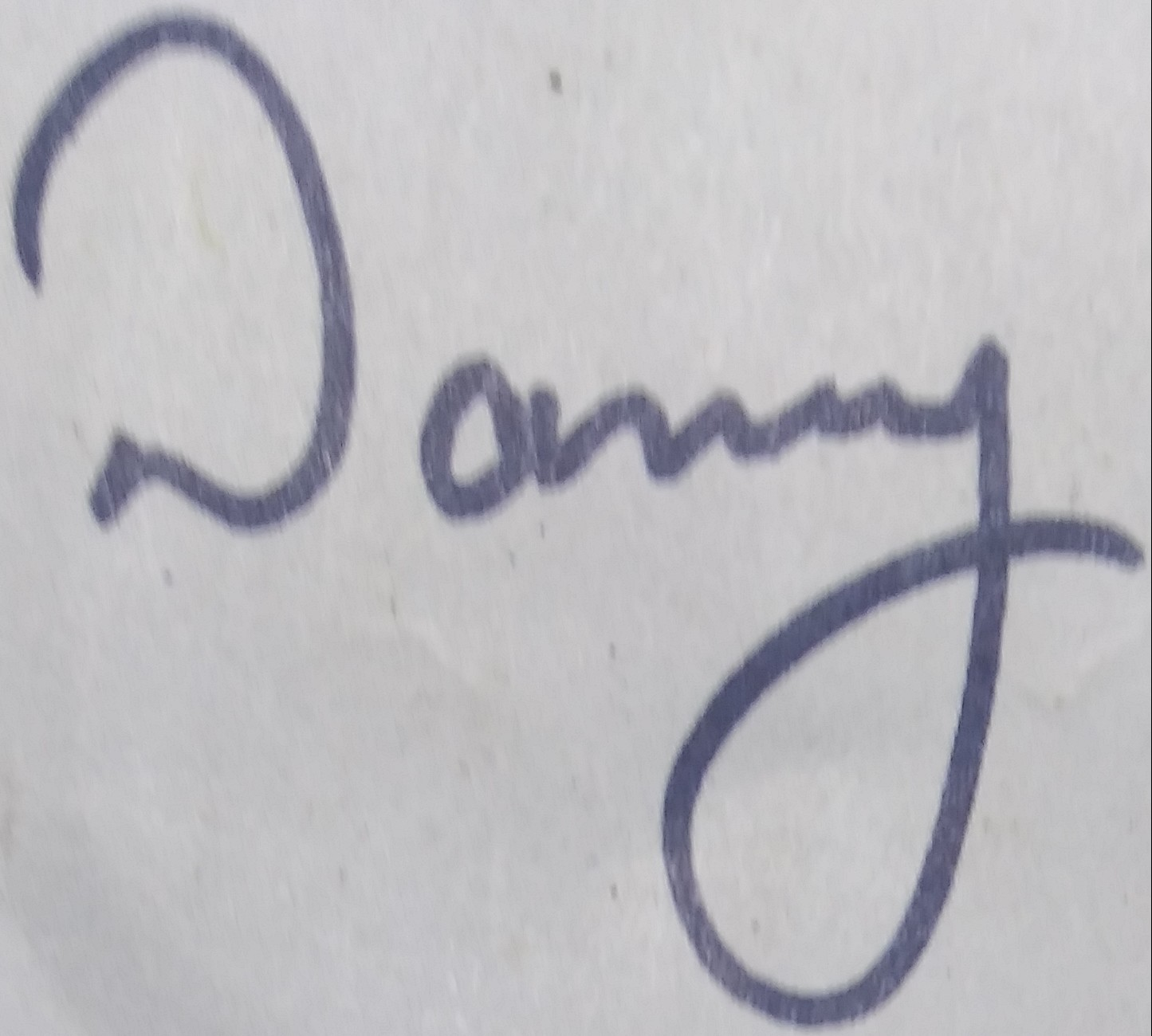
- Signature
- Website: Official website

Daniel J. O'Donnell (born November 17, 1960) is an American politician from the state of New York. A Democrat, he was the first openly gay man elected to the New York State Assembly in 2002. During his tenure as an Assembly Member, O'Donnell represented the 69th district in Manhattan, which comprises the neighborhoods of Manhattan Valley, Morningside Heights, and portions of the Upper West Side and West Harlem.

Known for his leading role in LGBTQ rights, O'Donnell was the legislative sponsor of the Marriage Equality Act, a law legalizing same-sex marriage, during its successful passage and signature into law on June 24, 2011. In 2010, he ushered in the passage of the anti-bullying Dignity for All Students Act. More recently, he led the charge to repeal 50-A and the gay panic defense and authored legislation making all public, single-occupancy bathrooms gender-neutral.

== Early life and education ==
O'Donnell was born in Flushing, Queens, and raised in Commack, New York. O'Donnell's father immigrated from Ireland, and his mother was Irish American. He grew up Catholic. O'Donnell is one of five siblings and is the brother of entertainer Rosie O'Donnell. O'Donnell and his siblings were sexually abused by their father. Rosie stated that "generational abuse and alcoholism" is prevalent in their family.

He attended The Catholic University of America before transferring to George Washington University for his Bachelor of Arts. O'Donnell received a Juris Doctor from the CUNY School of Law at Queens College.

== Career ==
After graduating law school in 1984, O'Donnell worked for seven years as a public defender in the criminal defense division of Brooklyn's Legal Aid Society before opening his own law firm on the Upper West Side. His community practice helped clients with tenant representation, as well as civil rights litigation ranging from employee discrimination to First Amendment rights. Since 2002, he has represented the 69th District in the New York Assembly.

O'Donnell first ran for the legislature in 1998, making an unsuccessful bid for the New York State Senate in the 30th district; he lost the Democratic primary to Eric Schneiderman.

When Assemblyman Edward C. Sullivan announced his retirement in 2002, O'Donnell was one of eight Democrats who entered the race to succeed him. In the crowded primary election held on September 10, 2002, O'Donnell won 34 percent of the vote, twice as much as his nearest competitor. In the general election that followed, he prevailed with 82 percent of the vote.

O'Donnell is the first openly gay man elected to the New York State Assembly.

O'Donnell ran uncontested in the 2008 and 2010 general elections. He was opposed in the September 13, 2016 Democratic Primary by Steven M. Appel, but won over 73% of the vote.

In 2008, O'Donnell was considered by New York Governor David Paterson to fill the Senate vacancy created by the appointment of Hillary Clinton as President Obama's Secretary of State. Paterson ultimately appointed upstate Congresswoman Kirsten Gillibrand to the seat.

In 2019, O'Donnell sought the New York City Public Advocate seat being vacated by Letitia James, who had been elected for New York State attorney general. He was defeated in the Democratic primary by Jumaane Williams.

=== Legislation ===
On June 19, 2007, O'Donnell ushered the Marriage Equality Act, a bill that would have legalized same-sex marriage in New York State, which passed by a vote of 85–61 in the Assembly. Although the bill passed the Assembly and had the support of then-Governor Eliot Spitzer, the Republican-controlled State Senate did not take up the measure. O'Donnell once again led the fight for an equal marriage bill in 2009, shepherding it to passage twice more, by a vote of 89–52 in May, and by a vote of 88–51 in December. O'Donnell introduced the Marriage Equality bill in the Assembly for the 2011–2012 legislative session on May 10, 2011. The Marriage Equality Act was passed by the NYS Assembly on June 15, 2011, and passed the NYS Senate and was signed into law by Governor Andrew Cuomo slightly before midnight on Friday, June 24, 2011.

O'Donnell was the prime sponsor of the Dignity for All Students Act, one of the first laws in New York history to explicitly include protections based on gender identity, gender expression, and sexual orientation. In 2019, New York enacted his legislation to ban the so-called gay and trans "panic" defense, which asks a jury to find that a victim's sexual orientation or gender identity is to blame for a defendant's violent reaction, including even murder. One year later, the legislature passed O'Donnell's bill requiring single-occupancy bathrooms to be gender-neutral, and Governor Andrew Cuomo signed it into law.

Beginning in 2017, O'Donnell introduced legislation to repeal 50-a, which prevents the public disclosure of police records. The legislation languished until 2020, when the murder of George Floyd renewed campaigns for repeal. On June 10, the New York State Legislature voted to repeal 50-a and on June 12, Governor Andrew Cuomo signed to repeal the law. The law repeals 50-a in its entirety – allowing individuals, lawyers, and the press to request police disciplinary files that have long been held in secret.

Additional legislative victories include: successfully lowering NYC speed limits to 25 mph; expanding sexual harassment protections to unpaid interns; mandating mental health discharge plans for incarcerated individuals; and passing the Domestic Violence Escalation Prevention Act, which bans individuals convicted of domestic violence from owning any type of firearm.

In November 2023, O'Donnell announced that he would not seek reelection to the New York State Assembly and would retire from electoral politics in January 2025.

== Controversy ==
On May 23, 2023, Assemblyman Daniel O'Donnell made a comment to Assemblymember Catalina Cruz that offended her as the Assemblyman walked out of a committee meeting on codes chaired by Assemblymember Jeffrey Dinowitz. The bill (sponsored by Assemblymember Amy Paulin) being debated was regarding police officers seizing guns owned by suspects during domestic violence situations. The members of the codes committee were also debating how many votes it needed to forward the bill out of committee onto the assembly floor for a vote. Cruz voted differently than O'Donnell. Following the vote, as O'Donnell exited the voting room, O'Donnell whispered to her, "Grow a pair, honey." O'Donnell was sanctioned by Speaker Carl Heastie for his actions.

== Personal life ==
O'Donnell is gay and advocates for LGBTQ rights.

On January 29, 2012, O'Donnell married his partner of 31 years, John Banta, whom he met at Catholic University. The ceremony and reception were attended by over 400 people including Governor Andrew Cuomo, Assembly Speaker Sheldon Silver, Comptroller Tom DiNapoli, Attorney General Eric Schneiderman, New York City Council Speaker Christine Quinn, many of his colleagues from the Assembly and State Senate, family, and friends. The couple were married by Judith Kaye, the former chief justice of the state Court of Appeals.

In 2011, O'Donnell was featured in Out Magazine's "Out 100," the magazine's list of the year's 100 most inspiring individuals.

He has been interviewed in periodicals for the "Bear" community.

== See also ==
- LGBT culture in New York City
- LGBT rights in New York
- List of LGBT people from New York City
- Same-sex marriage in New York

New York State Assembly
Preceded by Edward C. Sullivan	New York State Assembly, 69th District; 2003–2024	Succeeded by Micah Lasher
