= Campaign for Fiscal Equity =

The Campaign for Fiscal Equity (CFE) was a not-for-profit advocacy organization that sought to protect and promote the constitutional right to a sound basic education for all public school students in the State of New York. Under the leadership of Michael A. Rebell, the organization filed and won the landmark "CFE v. State of New York" lawsuit, which successfully argued that the state's school finance system under-funded New York City public schools and denied its students their constitutional right.

== History ==
The Campaign for Fiscal Equity (CFE) was founded in 1993 by Robert Jackson and Michael A. Rebell. They worked with parents, community members, and education advocates concerned about the state's funding of New York City schools, which the CFE felt was inadequate. The CFE filed a constitutional challenge stating that the state was under-funding the public schools in New York City. CFE received funding from a range of sources, including the Ford Foundation, The Rockefeller Foundation, the Horace W. Goldsmith Foundation, and the Schott Foundation.

== Campaign for Fiscal Equity, Inc. v. State ==
CFE filed its 13-year-long constitutional challenge to the New York State school funding system in 1993. The Court of Appeals, New York's highest court, ruled in 1995 that the New York State constitution requires that the state offer all children the opportunity for a "sound basic education," defined as a meaningful high school education that prepares students for competitive employment and civic participation.

== Actions and lawsuits 2001–2006 ==
In 2001, State Supreme Court Justice Leland DeGrasse found that the current state school funding system was unconstitutional. Governor George Pataki appealed the decision, which was overturned in 2002, by the Appellate Division of the New York Supreme Court. CFE appealed to the Court of Appeals, which again found in favor of CFE in 2003. The Court of Appeals gave the State of New York until July 30, 2004, to comply with its order.

The state failed to meet this deadline, however, and the court appointed three referees who were given until November 30, 2004, to submit a compliance plan to Justice Leland DeGrasse of the State Supreme Court. Justice DeGrasse agreed with the referees' recommendations and in 2005, ruled that New York City schools needed an additional $5.6 billion in annual operating aid and an additional $9.2 billion over five years for building, renovating, and leasing facilities in order to provide students with their constitutional right to the opportunity to receive a sound basic education.

Governor Pataki appealed again to the Appellate Division. In March 2006, the Appellate Division upheld most of the Supreme Court's ruling, ordering the state to provide between $4.7 billion and $5.63 billion in annual operating aid and $9.2 billion in capital funds. On April 1, the legislature enacted capital funding that met the court's requirement, but it did not comply with the operational funding order.

In November 2006, the Court of Appeals reaffirmed its 2003 decision, but citing the limited authority of the courts to direct the manner in which state money is spent, merely ordered the state to consider providing at least $2 billion more in annual operating aid to New York City's public schools.

== Education Budget and Reform Act of 2007 ==
During the 13-year long constitutional challenge, the CFE partnered with existing organizations across the state of New York. The group wanted to ensure that the new education finance system reform being put into place would successfully provide adequate funds and resources to students in public schools through the state, not just in New York City. Thousands of advocates, educators, school board members, business people, parents, students and community members worked to develop a statewide coalition for reform. Examples of campaigns used to raise awareness among New York citizens include: "Fair Funding, Better Schools" and the "100 Days to Educational Excellence". The framework formed by the CFE was finally recognized in April 2007, when the New York State Legislature enacted the State Education Budget and Reform Act of 2007. Under this law are the following mandates: 1) commitment to raise annual state aid for education in 2010–11 by $7 billion; 2) foundation formula committed to distributing aid solely based on need; 3) new input/output accountability requirements; and 4) public participation requirements in developing, approving and enforcing the Contracts of Excellence (law's primary accountability tool).

== Contract for Excellence (C4E) ==
The Education Act is enforced to offer resources and aid to the highest-need students in the lowest-performing schools. The above-mentioned primary accountability tool, the Contract for Excellence, is an annual plan which provides school-by-school reporting. It is completed and submitted by the low performing school districts that receive the increased funding from the state. The purpose of the contract is to target education strategies such as reduced class size, teacher/principal quality, full day pre-K, high school/middle school restructuring and model programs for English Language Learners. The contracts were developed in 2007. In the 2007–08 school year, 55 school districts (list of school districts in New York) in the state of New York completed and submitted Contracts for Excellence. School improvements were seen as the numbers decreased to 38 districts in 2008–09 and 32 districts in 2009–10.

In June 2010, an Analysis of New York City's 2009–10 Approved Contract for Excellence Allocations was released. The proposed funding and allocations approved by the State Education Department are compared. The report shows the decrease in spending on the "Class Size Reduction" by 11% as compared to the proposed funding, causing 62 fewer schools to receive allocations for more classes and lower teacher:pupil ratios. There was an increase in spending on "Time on Task" by 20%, giving these allocations to 82 additional schools. A small decrease in spending was seen in the "Teacher and Principal Quality", decreasing by 1.4%. "Middle and High School Restructuring" also had a small decrease of 3% while "Full Day pre-K" had an 8% increase. The final category "Model Programs for English Language Learners" saw a 2% increase in funding. The sharp increase in funding under the "Time on Task" category gives funding for Summer School and dedicated instruction. While the "Class Size Reduction" category experienced the sharpest decrease, it still receives the largest amount of funding.

== CFE work since 2007 ==
The New York State Legislature passed a budget for the 2008–9 school year that fully funded the Education Act, promoted by the CFE year 2 budget. An increase of $643 million was given to New York City schools during this year. However, under the Contract for Excellence, schools were required to be in need of improvement for two years instead of the one previously required. This limited the number of schools offered aid. The 2009–10 school year maintained previous education spending levels, but saw no funding increase freezing the CFE. However, the cuts proposed by the Executive Budget were not experienced by the public schools. The New York State Legislature stated that the funding increase should resume again in the 2011–12 school year.

== Controversies and aftermath of the lawsuit ==
Challenges arose after CFE won their 13-year lawsuit. Following the issuance of the court decisions, the state committed to increasing funding for New York City and other high-need districts by over $7 billion per year, over a four-year phase-in period. The state largely complied for the first two years, but after the Great Recession of 2008, the state first froze further increases and then substantially cut education funding.

As of 2020, New York State had still not provided New York City and other districts throughout the state with all the funds promised under the foundation aid formula adopted as a result of the suit. Despite increases over the years that have offset some of the substantial cuts that occurred after the 2008 recession, the State still was short about $4.5 billion in meeting its full funding obligations under the foundation aid formula that is still on the statute books, although its requirements had not been followed in recent years. In 2014, a statewide Coalition of major statewide education groups and advocacy groups filed New Yorkers for Students Educational Rights (NYSER) v. State of New York. The plaintiffs, represented by Michael Rebell and the Morgan, Lewis and Bokius sought full statewide funding of the foundation aid formula and to ensure that all students in New York City and other districts are provided the "meaningful opportunity for a sound basic education" guaranteed by Art. 12, section 1 of the New York State Constitution and the ruling of the Court of Appeals in the CFE case. In 2021, the NYSER suit was tentatively settled, based on the state's commitment to fully fund the remaining obligations of the foundation formula over the next three years, with the stipulation that if the amount was not fully paid out by the 2023–2024 school year, the lawsuit would promptly be reinstated. As of the 2022–2023 school year, the state had fully met its commitments for the first two years of the three year pledge.

== See also ==
- Education in New York City
- Michael Rebell
- Robert Jackson (NYC)
- Geri Palast
