= 2014 New York state elections =

- November 4, 2014

Elections were held in the State of New York on November 4, 2014. On that date, the State of New York held elections for the following offices: governor and lieutenant governor (on one ticket), attorney general, Comptroller, U.S. House of Representatives, New York State Senate, New York state assembly, and various others.

While the 2014 elections nationwide were considered a 'red wave election' that favored the Republican Party in a 'six-year itch' in reaction to Democratic President Barack Obama, with analysts calling it "the political equivalent of a pounding hangover with defeats more numerous and deeper than many Democrats had feared," Democratic Party candidates did fairly well in New York State, bucking the trend, from winning all four statewide elections to a good number of the most local elections.

Primary elections took place on September 9, 2014.

== Party strength ==
As of November 1, 2014, the Democratic Party (United States) was the largest party by enrollment of voters in New York State, with 5,346,661 active voters, compared to 2,584,405 Republicans; 147,232 Conservatives; 43,235 Working Families Party enrollees; 434,996 registered as "Independence Party" voters; 22,307 Green Party voters; 4,754 of other parties; and 2,243,844 not enrolled in any party; out of a total of 10,827,434 active voters.

== Political offices ==
=== Primary elections ===
In the primary election for Governor, Andrew Cuomo was re-nominated by 361,380 votes, compared to 192,210 for Zephyr Teachout and 20,760 votes for Randy Credico, out of a total of 574,350 votes. That was barely 60%, a notably low number for an incumbent whose opponent spent almost no money.

=== General election ===
Across the United States, the 2014 elections were considered a 'red wave' election that favored the Republican Party; voters in Red and Purple states had a 'six-year itch' in reaction to Democratic President Barack Obama. "Last night was a huge night for Republicans," the Public Broadcasting Service reported in November 2014: "They took back the Senate, netting seven seats (so far); they could get up to 250 House seats when all the vote counting is completed, which would be the most seats for Republicans since 1931; and they gained two governors seats...."

Despite this national landslide for the GOP, with "only a handful of exceptions," New York Democrats bucked the trend by keeping all four statewide political offices, and did fairly well in Congressional races, the state legislature, the judiciary, and even local elections, in large measure due to the heavy Democratic support in New York City.

In the longer run, the blame was due to lower turnout among Democratic voters in 2014, especially compared to 2018.

=== State offices ===
The following statewide elections were held for New York's constitutional offices on November 4, 2014:

- Governor and lieutenant governor, which was won by the ticket of Andrew Cuomo and Kathy Hochul, which was Hochul's first statewide election, and her first win;
- Attorney General, which was won by Eric Schneiderman;
- Comptroller, which was won by Tom DiNapoli.

The Democratic Party candidates did especially well in New York City.

The following New York State legislative elections were held:

1. All 63 Senators of the New York State Senate, and
2. All 150 Members of the New York state assembly.

=== Federal offices ===
There was no United States Senate race in New York that year. The 27 U.S. House of Representatives elections were also held in 2014.

=== Campaigning ===
The campaign involved candidates going to great lengths to secure endorsements, to present their views on the issues, and to gain support from voters. The Amsterdam News interviewed a dozen candidates in June 2014 for possible endorsements for the upcoming elections. Several candidates, including Andrew Cuomo, Dean Skelos, Jeff Klein, Assembly Speaker Sheldon Silver, and Eric Adams took a trip to Israel to show support for that state. The Killing of Eric Garner was a significant issue in the campaign; debates were scheduled for the gubernatorial election and the lieutenant-gubernatorial race.

Fracking policy and law was another issue that was "determined" by both statewide and local elections.

This was the first campaign to show the full political impact of Citizens United in the Empire State's elections.

In 2014, a pattern developed of Upstate "Democratic activists and voters in rural New York are motivated by their passion for certain policies, rather than the more transactional reasons that one might get involved in Democratic politics in a city where the party dominates local government," resulting in them voting for more left-wing candidates, contrary to popular belief that they're right-wing. For example, Teachout, the leftist candidate for Governor in the 2014 primary election, won 26 out of 56 counties in Upstate, including Albany County, Rensselaer County, Schenectady County, and Tompkins County, and "nearly the whole Hudson Valley."

=== Local elections ===
There were also some county-wide elections. The ones in the larger counties (by population) included districts attorney, town councils, boards of education, and county clerks.

In Albany County, there were a dozen local offices up for election. Two members of the City of Albany board of education were elected, which is officially non-partisan. A Democratic candidate was elected to the Berne town council, but a Republican was elected highway supervisor. Democrats were also elected to town council and three members of the Village board of trustees of Green Island.

== Judicial elections ==
Elections were held for New York Supreme Court, the trial court of highest order general jurisdiction in most of the judicial districts. These included:

- 1st (New York County), where the two Democratic candidates won without opposition;
- 2nd (Kings), where four cross-endorsed candidates won;
- 11th (Queens), where the vote was split between four cross-endorsed winning candidates;
- 12th (Bronx), won by a cross-endorsed candidate.

There was also elections in the Counties of the Bronx; New York, where Democratic candidates won; and Brooklyn (Kings) for civil courts.

In addition, some Upstate counties and cities also elected judges to limited jurisdiction courts. Albany County elected Democrats a Surrogate Court judge and Family Court judge, and the city of Albany elected a city court judge; they also elected judges to town courts in the towns of Bethlehem, Coeymans, and Rensselaerville.

== Ballot propositions ==
There were three statewide propositions in New York in 2014:

1. Prop 1 concerned creating a legislative redistricting commission.
2. Prop 2 would allow for the use of electronic copies of bills (proposed legislation) in lieu of paper copies, in the legislative branch.
3. Prop 3 was a bond proposal called the "New York Bonds for School Technology Act", which would allow the state comptroller to borrow money by issuing bonds for technology for schools.

All three proposals passed. The Redistricting Commission amendment passed 1,705,903 yes to 1,252,213 no. The Electronic Bills amendment passed overwhelmingly, with a yes vote in every county, 2,329,959 to 681,232. The School Bonds vote was a solid 1,921,054 yes to 1,180,581 no.
