= Leland DeGrasse =

American lawyer

Leland G. DeGrasse

Associate Justice of the First Judicial Department
- In office 2008–2015
- Appointed by: David Paterson

Justice on the New York Supreme Court, 1st Judicial District
- In office 1988–2008

Judge on the New York City Civil Court
- In office 1985–1988

Personal details
- Born: 1945 or 1946 (age 80–81) New York, New York
- Spouse: Carol E. Huff
- Education: St. John’s University; Howard University School of Law

Leland George DeGrasse (born 1945/1946) was a judge in New York, New York, who served for seven years as an associate justice of the New York Appellate Division of the Supreme Court, First Judicial Department.

== Early life and education ==
DeGrasse was born in New York City. His father was a postal clerk, his mother became a computer programmer. As a child, he studied in Catholic school. In 1967, he graduated from St. John's University with a degree in Spanish. He is a 1972 graduate of Howard University School of Law.

== Legal career ==
He was an Assistant District Attorney with the Bronx County District Attorney's office between 1972 and 1975. He subsequently served on the New York City Civil Court from 1985 to 1988. He was a New York Supreme Court Justice, 1st Judicial District, from 1988 to 2008. He was designated a Justice for the Appellate Division, First Judicial Department in 2008 by Governor David Paterson. He retired from the bench in 2015.

He is best known for being the trial judge in the case of Campaign for Fiscal Equity v. State, which was brought to compel an overhaul of state aid-to-education formulas. His decision was appealed all the way up to the New York Court of Appeals. Ultimately, the Court of Appeals ordered an additional $1.9 billion in state aid annually for New York City's schools.
