= New York's 69th State Assembly district =

American legislative district

Assemblymember
Micah Lasher; D–Upper West Side

New York's 69th State Assembly district is one of the 150 districts in the New York State Assembly. It has been represented by Democrat Micah Lasher since 2025. In 2026, he announced that he would not run for re-election.

== Geography ==
District 69 is located in Manhattan, comprising Manhattan Valley, Morningside Heights, and portions of the Upper West Side and West Harlem. It overlaps with New York's 12th and 13th Congressional districts, the 30th and 47th districts of the New York State Senate, and the 6th and 7th districts of the New York City Council. Portions of Central Park and the main campus of Columbia University is located in this district.

The district (partially) overlaps with New York's 12th and 13th congressional districts, as well as the 28th and 47th districts of the New York State Senate, and the 6th and 7th districts of the New York City Council.

== Recent election results ==
=== 2026 ===
2026 New York State Assembly election, District 69
Primary election
Party	Candidate	Votes	%
Democratic	Eli Northrup	15,713	60.4
Democratic	Stephanie Ruskay	10,211	39.3
Write-in		83	0.3
Total votes		26,007	100.0
General election
Democratic	Eli Northrup		
Working Families	Eli Northrup		
Total	Eli Northrup		
Write-in			
Total votes			100.0

=== 2024 ===
2024 New York State Assembly election, District 69
Primary election
Party	Candidate	Votes	%
Democratic	Micah Lasher	7,410	52.6
Democratic	Eli Northrup	4,839	34.4
Democratic	Carmen Quinones	832	5.9
Democratic	Melissa Rosenberg	671	4.8
Democratic	Jack Kellner	293	2.1
Write-in		36	0.2
Total votes		14,081	100.0
General election
Democratic	Micah Lasher	48,223	99.1
Write-in		434	0.9
Total votes		48,657	100.0
Democratic hold			

=== 2022 ===
2022 New York State Assembly election, District 69
Party	Candidate	Votes	%
Democratic	Daniel O'Donnell (incumbent)	39,239	90.1
Republican	Ian Mckenzie	4,219	9.7
Write-in		71	0.2
Total votes		43,529	100.0
Democratic hold			

=== 2020 ===
2020 New York State Assembly election, District 69
Party	Candidate	Votes	%
Democratic	Daniel O'Donnell (incumbent)	52,354	99.0
Write-in		526	1.0
Total votes		52,880	100.0
Democratic hold			

=== 2018 ===
2018 New York State Assembly election, District 33
Primary election
Party	Candidate	Votes	%
Democratic	Daniel O'Donnell (incumbent)	15,484	64.5
Democratic	Ruben Vargas	8,392	35.0
Write-in		116	0.5
Total votes		23,992	100.0
General election
Democratic	Daniel O'Donnell (incumbent)	44,788	92.9
Republican	Corina Cotenescu	3,379	7.0
Write-in		65	0.1
Total votes		48,232	100.0
Democratic hold			

=== 2016 ===
2016 New York State Assembly election, District 33
Primary election
Party	Candidate	Votes	%
Democratic	Daniel O'Donnell (incumbent)	7,255	78.1
Democratic	Steven Appel	1,971	21.2
Write-in		62	0.7
Total votes		9,288	100.0
General election
Democratic	Daniel O'Donnell (incumbent)	49,526	90.2
Republican	Stephen Garrin	5,334	9.7
Write-in		76	0.1
Total votes		54,936	100.0
Democratic hold			

=== 2014 ===
2014 New York State Assembly election, District 69
Party	Candidate	Votes	%
Democratic	Daniel O'Donnell (incumbent)	22,091	99.5
Write-in		108	0.5
Total votes		22,199	100.0
Democratic hold			

=== 2012 ===
2012 New York State Assembly election, District 69
Party	Candidate	Votes	%
Democratic	Daniel O'Donnell (incumbent)	44,593	99.9
Write-in		106	0.5
Total votes		44,699	100.0
Democratic hold			

=== 2010 ===
2010 New York State Assembly election, District 69
Party	Candidate	Votes	%
Democratic	Daniel O'Donnell (incumbent)	27,434	99.6
Write-in		98	0.4
Total votes		27,532	100.0
Democratic hold			
