= Michael Rebell =

American lawyer

Michael A. Rebell
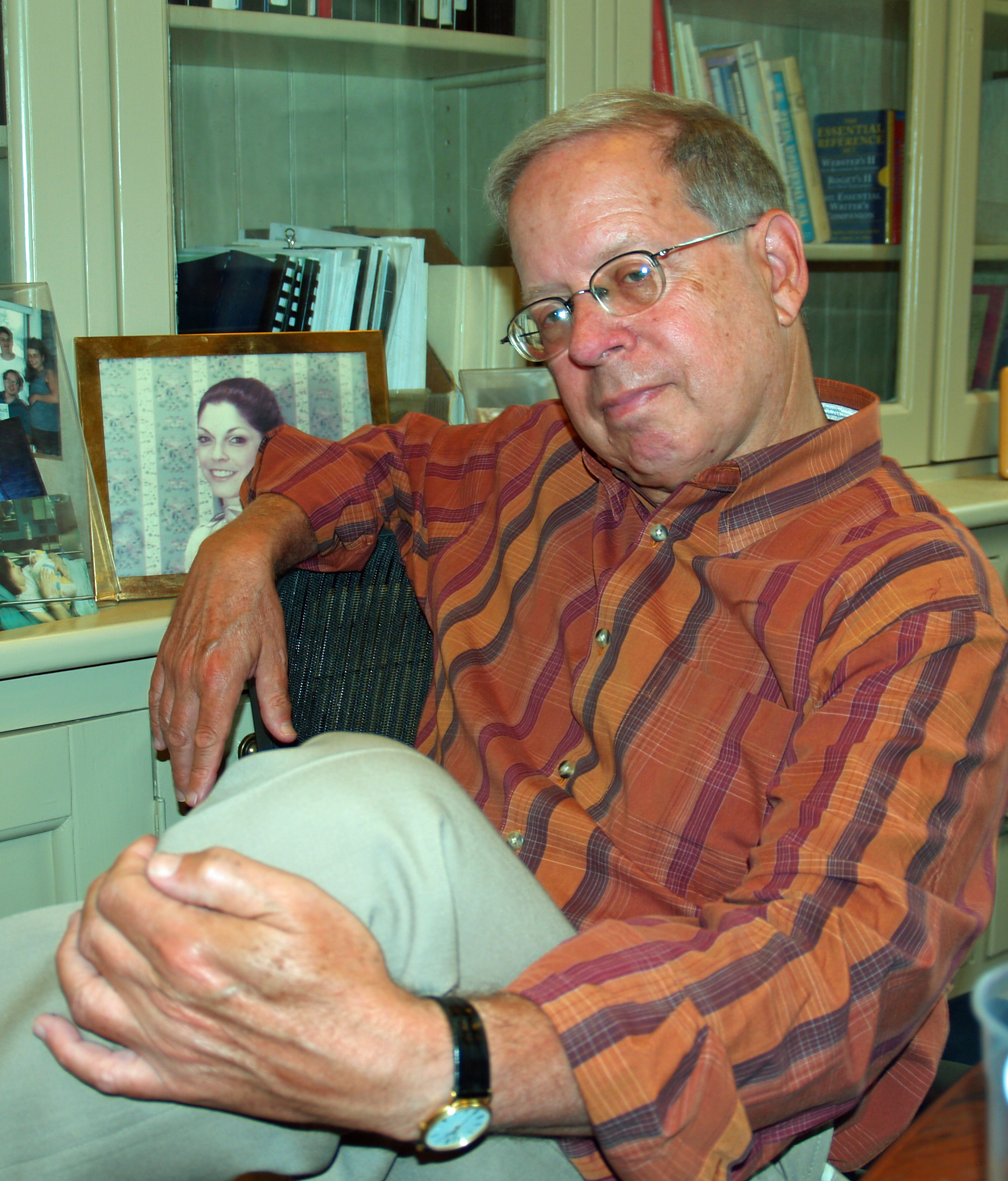
- Education: Yale Law School
- Employer: Center for Educational Equity at Teachers College
- Organization: New York State Civic Readiness Task Force
- Known for: education law, Campaign for Fiscal Equity, Inc. (CFE) v. State of New York

Michael A. Rebell is the executive director of the Center for Educational Equity at Teachers College, Columbia University. He is an experienced litigator in the field of education law, and he is also professor of law and educational practice at Teachers College. He has also taught at Harvard, Yale, and Columbia Law Schools.

Rebell is the convener of the DemocracyReadyNY Coalition, a statewide organization that seeks to promote civic preparation of students throughout New York State. He formerly chaired the NY Regents Task Force on Civic Readiness. He also was lead counsel for the plaintiffs in Cook v. Raimondo, a major federal litigation that sought to establish a right to an education adequate for capable citizenship under the U.S. Constitution. Rebell is the author of Flunking Democracy: Schools, Courts and Civic Participation (U of Chicago Press, 2018) and five other books and dozens of article on law and education issues, including educational equity, education finance, civic education, rights of students with disability and the role of the courts in educational policy He is a graduate of Harvard College and Yale Law School.

Rebell was co-counsel for the plaintiffs in Campaign for Fiscal Equity, Inc. (CFE) v. State of New York, a school funding "adequacy" lawsuit that claimed that the State of New York was not adequately funding public schools in New York City. Rebell argued the case three times before the New York Court of Appeals, New York's highest court.

Prior to becoming involved in the CFE litigation, Rebell litigated other class action lawsuits in the area of education, including Jose P. v. Mills, a case involving funding for education for students with disabilities. He also served as a court-appointed special master in Allen v. Park, a special education case in Boston.

Rebell has received a great deal of recognition for his work in education law, and on the CFE litigation in particular. In 2003, the New York Times ran a profile of Rebell in its "Public Lives" series.

In December 2006, the editorial board of the New York Daily News listed Rebell as a "strong contender" for its first New Yorker of the Year award, for his work on the CFE litigation (the editorial board gave the award to New York City Mayor Michael Bloomberg). Rebell calls himself "a child of the 60's" and says he was inspired by John F. Kennedy's call to public service. He attended Harvard College as an undergraduate and subsequently served in the Peace Corps for two years in Sierra Leone. After returning from the Peace Corps, he attended Yale Law School.

== Books ==
- Flunking Democracy: Schools, Courts, and Civic Participation, University of Chicago Press, 2018
- Courts and Kids: Pursuing Educational Equity in the State Courts, University of Chicago Press, 2009
- Moving Every Child Along: From NCLB Hype to Meaningful Educational Opportunity (With Jessica R. Wolff), Teachers College Press, 2008.
- Equality and Education (With Arthur R. Block), Princeton University Press, 1985.
- Educational Policy Making and the Courts: An Empirical Study of Judicial Activism (With Arthur R. Block), University of Chicago Press, 1982.
